= Elvis (1990 TV series) =

- Genre: Biography; Drama; Music
- Created by: Rick Husky; Priscilla Presley
- Starring: Michael St. Gerard; Millie Perkins; Billy Green Bush; Jesse Dabson; Blake Gibbons; Kelli Williams; Jordan Williams
- Opening theme: All Shook Up performed by Ronnie McDowell
- Composer: Steve Tyrell
- Country of origin: United States
- Original language: English
- No. of seasons: 1
- No. of episodes: 13 (10 aired, 3 unaired)

Production
- Executive producers: Rick Husky; James D. Parriott; Priscilla Presley
- Producers: Albert J. Salzer; Jerry Schilling; Gary Markowitz
- Running time: 30 minutes
- Production companies: James D. Parriott Productions; Navarone Productions; Rick Husky Productions; New World Television

Original release
- Network: ABC
- Release: February 6 – May 19, 1990

Elvis (also known as Elvis – Good Rockin' Tonight) is an American drama television series about the early life of Elvis Presley that aired on ABC from February 6 until May 19, 1990, before its cancellation due to the high cost of each episode. These ten episodes, along with three unaired episodes, were edited into a four-hour mini-series titled Elvis: The Early Years. The series starred Michael St. Gerard as Presley, Jesse Dabson, Blake Gibbons, Millie Perkins, and Billy "Green" Bush. Elvis voice-impersonator Ronnie McDowell provided the singing voice for St. Gerard on the series.

== Plot ==
Elvis: Good Rockin' Tonight was a series offering a dramatic re-creation of Presley's time just before becoming a major star, focusing on him in 1954 and 1955 as he was beginning his recording career at Sun Records.

== Production ==
Michael St. Gerard had played Presley twice before, in the 1989 films Great Balls of Fire! and Heart of Dixie; and once again after this series, in a 1993 episode of Quantum Leap.

Millie Perkins starred as the real Elvis's love interest in the 1961 film, Wild in the Country. Here she plays his mother.

Matt Dillon and Scott Valentine were the first two choices for the role of Presley.

St. Gerard's audition was a line read, and him lip syncing to "Baby, Let's Play House". He was flown to Memphis the next day to start filming. The brown-eyed St. Gerard refused to wear blue contacts for the role.

1151 Tanglewood St. Memphis, TN 38114 was the filming location for the home of Elvis's high school girlfriend in the series, Mattie Walker. One scene includes her and Elvis talking on the front porch.

== Cast ==
- Michael St. Gerard as Elvis Presley
- Millie Perkins as Gladys Presley
- Billy Green Bush as Vernon Presley
- Jesse Dabson as Scotty Moore
- Blake Gibbons as Bill Black
- Kelli Williams as Mattie Walker
- Jordan Williams as Sam Phillips
- Howard French as Harley “Red” Calder

== Episodes ==
No.	Title	Directed by	Written by	Original release date
1	"Money, Honey"	Steve Miner	Rick Husky	February 6, 1990
Elvis records his first demo, "My Happiness". His father injures his back, and forces Elvis to support the family. A year later, Sam Phillips calls to have Elvis come back into Sun Records, and work with some musicians, Scotty Moore and Bill Black.
2	"The Storm"	Steve Miner	James D. Parriott	February 11, 1990
Elvis tries out a few songs at Sun Records, which leads to the recording of his first record, "That’s All Right, Mama". The record is played on the air, and Elvis realizes his life is about to change.
3	"The Locket"	Arlene Sanford	Jason Brett	February 18, 1990
Elvis, Scotty and Bill play their first gig. Elvis opens with a ballad, and then tears into "Good Rockin’ Tonight", shaking his hips, driving the crowd wild. Elvis' girlfriend, fearing all the attention he is getting, gives him a locket.
4	"Bel Air Breakdown"	Bruce Seth Green	Peter Z. Orton	March 4, 1990
Elvis, Scotty and Bill go out on the road for their first tour. On the way, they encounter many troubles as they tour the country as the first rock 'n' roll group.
5	"Hole in the Pocket"	Steve Miner	Jim McGrath	March 11, 1990
Elvis gets his first royalty check and spends it on a pink Cadillac.
6	"Roots"	Steve Miner	Rick Husky	March 18, 1990
Elvis, Scotty and Bill get a show in Tupelo, Mississippi. Elvis meets up with old friends, and, after his show at the local all-white high school, sits in at an all-black blues club.
7	"Grand Ole Opry"	Arlene Sanford	Story by : Debra Frank & Jack Weinstein; Teleplay by : Debra Frank & Jack Weinstein & Jim McGrath	May 5, 1990
Elvis and the boys get the offer to perform at the Grand Ole Opry where, after their heads swell a bit, they go over like a lead balloon.
8	"Sun Sessions"	Beth Hillshafer	Gary Markowitz	May 5, 1990
They go back to Memphis with their tails between their legs, and struggle to record their next record.
9	"Bodyguards"	Bethany Rooney	Susan B. Chick	May 12, 1990
Fans start reacting to Elvis, and it becomes more than he can handle.
10	"Let It Burn"	Michael Levine	James D. Parriott	May 19, 1990
Elvis is on the road with his band. He cheats on his girlfriend, and she catches him at it.
11	"Moody's Blues"	Steve Miner	Gary Markowitz	Unaired
Elvis (as a high school student), learns the blues from a Beale St. street musician.
12	"Old Man"	Bethany Rooney	Jim McGrath	Unaired
Scotty struggles as Elvis' manager and guitar player, and, by the end of the episode, Bob Neal has become their manager, and Scotty can focus on the music.
13	"Four Mules"	Bruce Seth Green	James D. Parriott	Unaired
Elvis, Scotty and Bill book themselves at the Louisiana Hayride, the major radio show that gave Elvis his start. The subplot revolves around all of the characters being as stubborn as mules, the fourth "mule" being Sam Phillips.

== Reception ==
The show struggled with low ratings and mediocre reviews. Then-ABC Entertainment president Bob Iger opted cancel the series early into its run on March 14, 1990. This was two months before it officially ceased airing, with the show also not being able to air the last three episodes which were filmed.
