= MILF Manor =

American TV series

- Genre: Reality
- Created by: Anna Edwinson; Nick Bullen
- Country of origin: United States
- Original language: English
- No. of seasons: 2
- No. of episodes: 21

Production
- Running time: 42 minutes
- Production companies: Spun Gold; Lionsgate Television

Original release
- Network: TLC
- Release: January 15, 2023 – July 14, 2024

MILF Manor is an American reality television series that premiered January 15, 2023, on TLC. The first season of the show featured eight single women between the ages of 40 and 60 living in a villa in Mexico to pursue romantic relationships with eight single men several decades younger. In the first season, the show focuses on the men in question being the women's sons.

A second season premiered on April 28, 2024. The premise shifted slightly: the single women were pursued by younger men and their fathers.

== Premise ==
Eight pairs of mothers and sons travel to a villa in Mexico to look for love. Upon arrival, the contestants are told the 16 contestants were to romantically pursue each other. The announcement is a surprise to the contestants: one contestant, April, stated she thought her son would be on a separate retreat instead of in her dating pool.

The contestants perform challenges in each episode. In the first episode, the blindfolded women have to identify their son by feeling the men's shirtless torsos, and the winner of the challenge receives a night in one of the suites with a hot tub. Each mother-son pair shares a room. In the second episode, the contestants guess each other's deepest sex secrets, and one of the women reveals she has had sex with her son's best friend. The fourth episode introduces elimination to the program, as one mother-son duo is kicked off, and the fifth episode introduces a new mother-son duo (Lisa/Ryan S) to take their place.

The show's title refers to the acronym "MILF", meaning "Mother I'd Like to Fuck", though the show's definition of MILF leans closer to the idea of a cougar, in which an older woman actively pursues younger men, whereas the term "MILF" only implies the sexual attractiveness of the woman and not her own romantic/sexual tendencies.

The second season takes place in a lakefront chalet and instead features the younger men (ages 21 to 27) competing against their own fathers (ages 51 to 57) for the same pool of women.

== Cast ==
=== Season 1 ===
Mother	Age	Son	Age	Description
Charlene DeCicco	46	Harrison Bock	23	They live in Los Angeles and previously lived in Hammonton, New Jersey. Charlene works in the hospitality industry. Harrison is a college football player and a former male entertainer.
Shannan Diggs	51	Ryan Jovan	30	Shannan is an event planner from Atlanta who was married for 18 years. Ryan worked in social media marketing and now is pursuing a career in music.
Kelle Mortensen	51	Joey Buford	20	Kelle lives in Orange County and works as a real estate broker, fitness coach, and a self-proclaimed "Disco Mommy." She has six children including Joey, who is a bartender and aspiring real estate agent.
April Marie Watson	44	Ricky Snyder	26	April is an insurance representative and an event planner and Ricky works for the United States Postal Service. Both live in Detroit.
Stefany Johnson	47	Billy	28	Stefany is a paralegal and realtor. She moved from Lima to Los Angeles when she was 8. Billy is pursuing a career in real estate and always dates older women.
SoYoung	51	Jimmy Kristensen	26	SoYoung works as a surgical nurse who specializes in heart surgery and lives outside of New Orleans. Jimmy is a model and actor. Previously, he was in the army.
Pola Mochon	48	Jose Mizrahi	28	Pola is a former ballerina who owns a gym in Miami. Her husband died in a car accident when her children were young. She is from Mexico and prefers to speak Spanish. Her son Jose works with her in the fitness industry and also is an actor and television host.
April Jayne	60	Gabriel Jayne	23	April Jayne is a personal trainer whose fiancé died in 2022. Gabriel is in a rock band with his brother and father. Both live in Los Angeles.
Lisa Wilcox	59	Ryan Sherman	26	Lisa is an actress best known for her role as Alice Johnson in the A Nightmare On Elm Street films and Ryan is a software engineer.

=== Season 2 ===
Mother	Age	Description
Barby	45	Barby is a former stripper who currently works as a marketing executive. She is originally from Mexico City.
Christina	46	Christina is a public relations executive who was married for twenty years.
Crystal	48	Crystal is a makeup artist. She has four sons, one of whom was killed in a shootout.
Jami	51	Jami is a dance instructor who has been divorced twice.
Kelly Mac	59	Kelly is a pilates instructor who immigrated from Vietnam during the Fall of Saigon.
Lannette	50	Lannette is an account manager.
Rebecca	48	Rebecca is a fitness model and insurance agent.
Shauna	44	Shauna is an artist who was married for eighteen years.

Father	Age	Son	Age	Description
Anthony	54	Joey	21	Anthony owns an Italian restaurant. Joey is an event promoter.
Darren	57	Sam	24	Darren is a recent divorcé who sells private jets.
Ashley	54	Jacob	23	Ashley is an athletics coach and former professional rugby player. Jacob is a former semi-professional cricket player. Both are from England.
Stacy	54	Miles	24	Stacy is an entrepreneur. Miles is a vegan chef and personal trainer. The two have a distant relationship.
Michael	51	Christopher	27	Chris is a professional MMA fighter.

== Episodes ==
=== Series overview ===
Season	Episodes	Originally released	
Season	Episodes	First released	Last released
1	9	January 15, 2023	March 19, 2023
2	12	April 28, 2024	July 14, 2024

=== Season 1 (2023) ===
No. overall	No. in season	Title	Original release date	US viewers (millions)
1	1	"MILF Said Knock You Out"	January 15, 2023	0.92
The eight moms are introduced, alongside the twist that the younger men in their dating pool consist of their sons. For the episode's challenge, the moms take turns feeling up the shirtless men while blindfolded, seeing who can identify their son the fastest.
2	2	"Your MILF Should Know"	January 22, 2023	0.75
Each contestant must anonymously post a sexual secret on a corkboard and guess which one belongs to their mother or son, with the goal being for each pair to stump each other. The winning sons get a date with a mom of their choice. During the challenge, SoYoung reveals that she had sex with Jimmy's best friend, which leaves him shaken up.
3	3	"Your MILF Don't Dance"	January 29, 2023	0.62
The contestants must try to wow each other by performing a mother-son dance routine, with the winning pair earning a date at a nightclub.
4	4	"She's a Bad MILF Jama"	February 5, 2023	0.56
The contestants have a round of speed-dating and are scored based on how much they click with each other. The first elimination takes place after this challenge, with April W. and Ricky being the pair to head home.
5	5	"MILF I'm a Big Boy Now"	February 19, 2023	0.62
Lisa and Ryan S. join the villa and get acquainted with the others. For this episode's challenge, the mothers must quiz their sons in Sex Ed.
6	6	"MILF Told Me Not To Come"	February 26, 2023	0.65
With everyone blindfolded, the sons must give the mothers a massage, earning a score based on their performance.
7	7	"MILF's Broken Heart"	March 5, 2023	0.67
The moms and sons must sort through a pile of dirty laundry and try to identify each other's underwear. Following this, everyone must choose their match, with the risk of getting sent home if the feeling is not mutual.
8	8	"I Ain't Your MILF"	March 12, 2023	0.61
The remaining couples –– Ryan and Pola, Kelle and José, Joey and April J., and Stefany and Gabriel –– have to receive an appraisal from outside sources, in the form of the mothers' friends and family members.
9	9	"I'll Always Love My MILF"	March 19, 2023	0.70
The remaining contestants have to write letters to their partners, deciding whether they want to continue their relationship outside of the villa. Everyone decides to stay together, while April J. lets Joey down gently and offers to remain friends.

=== Season 2 (2024) ===
No. overall	No. in season	Title	Original release date	US viewers (millions)
10	1	"MILFstruck"	April 28, 2024	0.46
The moms and younger men are introduced to the chalet and each other. The first challenge involves the group breaking off into pairs (aside from Barby acting as host), pouring maple syrup onto each other, and seeing who can drip the largest amount into a jar in order to win a date. The episode ends with the men's fathers showing up to compete with them for the women.
11	2	"MILFA Mia"	May 5, 2024	0.44
The fathers properly introduce themselves and settle into the chalet, garnering a mixed reception among the fellow contestants. For this episode's challenge, the fathers and sons see who can wow the women via a team striptease.
12	3	"She's All MILF"	May 12, 2024	0.54
Kelle returns from Season 1 and chooses to take Joey and Anthony on a tantric yoga date. Jami confesses to Christina that she has a boyfriend outside of the chalet, and the secret quickly spreads around.
13	4	"MILF's Just Not That Into You"	May 19, 2024	0.50
Jami leaves the manor after her secret is revealed. The remaining contestants (barring Darren, who picks Stacy as his stand-in) later mud-wrestle to see who can grab their flag first, with the loser having to reveal a dirty secret. The two fastest winners get to pick a date.
14	5	"How To Lose a MILF in 10 Days"	May 26, 2024	0.39
While the contestants are all enjoying a day at the beach, a pair of new men show up: nephew Connor and uncle David, who choose to take Kelle and Christina on a double date. Meanwhile, a love triangle starts to form between Barby, Jacob, and Chris.
15	6	"Failure to MILF"	June 2, 2024	0.45
The women have to take turns texting sexy selfies to the men they feel they have the strongest connection to. Four of the men––Jacob, Ashley, Michael, and Miles––end up not receiving a sext and are thus eliminated.
16	7	"Along Came MILF'y"	June 9, 2024	0.55
Shauna and Rebecca enter the manor, threatening some of the existing connections. Rebecca hosts the next challenge, in which the men pair up with their hands cuffed behind their backs, seeing who can eat watermelon from between the women's legs the fastest. The winning team earns a double-date with the women of their choice.
17	8	"MILFless"	June 16, 2024	0.47
Joey and Anthony go on a body-painting double date with Shauna and Rebecca. This episode's challenge involves the men sticking their rear ends through holes, as the women take turns removing their blindfolds and trying to determine whose buttocks are whose. Barby makes more correct guesses than the others and scores a date with Chris. Amidst everything, an ire is raised against Rebecca, who is hitting on every man in the chalet.
18	9	"Runaway MILF"	June 23, 2024	0.57
Chris and Barby go on a date at a winery. Kelle and Christina confront Rebecca over her promiscuity. A heartbroken Lannette decides to leave the chalet after seeing Anthony get close to Rebecca.
19	10	"Mean MILFs"	June 30, 2024	0.54
While everyone reacts to the news from the previous night, uncle and nephew duo Rob and Fletcher join the manor. The older and younger men compete to see who can give the women's questions superior answers, with the losing team having to clean up the chalet. Chris is hurt by one of Barby's answers and gives her the cold shoulder, offending her into leaving.
20	11	"MILF Actually"	July 7, 2024	0.51
Chris apologizes to Barby and convinces her to stay. The next day, a friend or family member of each of the women arrives to appraise their current relationships. Barby and Kelle have a falling out, prompting Barby and Chris to leave the chalet to focus on their relationship without any distractions.
21	12	"A MILF To Remember"	July 14, 2024	0.50
The remaining contestants take a questionnaire to determine how compatible they are in their current relationships. Sam and Fletcher are eliminated after not finding a match. Shauna voluntarily leaves after realizing that Joey isn't what she truly wants, prompting him to leave as well. Afterwards, the women and men separate to contemplate whether they want to continue their connections outside the chalet. Kelly Mac and Darren stay together, as do Kelle and Rob. David and Christina break things off; Rebecca chooses Connor over Anthony; Crystal refuses to show up at the altar with Stacy, not wanting to have another heartbreak.

== Reception ==
Naomi Fry wrote in The New Yorker that MILF Manor "might be a new low for reality TV, perhaps even a rock bottom", stating that the show's premise was "only slightly less outlandish than 'MILF Island,' featured on NBC's 30 Rock, back in 2008."

Daniela Neumann, the managing director of the London-based production company behind the idea for the show, said that she does not understand "what all the fuss is about" and that the series is about "female empowerment, erasing the double standard stigma of older women dating younger men, that everyone on the show had a good time, and that every man is someone's son."

The show currently has a 14% rating on Rotten Tomatoes, where critics describe it as "psychological torture" and "Freudian Horror".

== See also ==
- List of programs broadcast by TLC
