= Clinger (film) =

- Directed by: Michael Steves
- Written by: Gabi Chennisi Duncombe; Bubba Fish; Michael Steves
- Starring: Vincent Martella; Jennifer Laporte; Julia Aks; Lisa Wilcox
- Cinematography: Gabi Chennisi Duncombe
- Edited by: Bubba Fish
- Music by: Misha Segal
- Production company: Clinger The Movie
- Release date: January 12, 2015 (Slamdance Film Festival)
- Running time: 81 minutes
- Country: United States
- Language: English

Clinger is a 2015 comedy horror film and the feature film directorial debut of Michael Steves, who co-wrote the film with Gabi Chennisi Duncombe and Bubba Fish.

== Plot ==
Fern is a high school student with a problem: her ex-boyfriend Robert returned from the grave as a ghost. Their relationship wasn't entirely a happy one, since Robert was clingy and smothered her, which led to their breakup. Initially, Fern tried to make things work, but quickly determines that a relationship between a ghost and a living person would not be successful, especially as she has begun to spend time with Harlan, a football player. After Robert subjects her and others to a series of supernatural attacks, Fern turns to her track coach Valeria, who doubles as a ghost hunter. Valeria gives her a series of tools that could help her get rid of Robert's ghost, which includes pills that give her the ability to see ghosts. Fern is finally forced to tell Robert that she doesn't think that the two of them can be together since she's of the living, only for Robert to then change his tactics. Instead of trying to romance her, Robert has decided that the only way they can be together is to kill Fern so that their ghosts can be together. He enlists several other ghosts to help in his efforts, making it necessary for Fern to bring her family and Valeria into the fight. Eventually, Fern and Robert have a face off, during which she manages to convince him to let her go, causing him and the other ghosts to vanish. The film ends with Harlan asking Fern out on a date, to which she replies that she'd like to be single for a while before starting to date again.

== Cast ==
- Vincent Martella as Robert Klingher
- Jennifer Laporte as Fern Petersen
- Julia Aks as Kelsey Petersen
- Shonna Major as Moe Watkins
- Alicia Monet Caldwell as Valeria Kingsley
- Taylor Clift as Harlan
- Leah Henley as Temperance Baker
- Paulie Deo Jr. as Dean
- Rebecca Gail as Jenny Bernstein
- Jeffrey Bean as Phil Petersen
- Debbie Rochon as Lynette Petersen
- Lisa Wilcox as Eugenia Klingher
- Sewell Whitney as Arthur Klingher
- Victoria Villarreal as Georgia
- Bobby C. King as Western Outlaw Ghost

== Reception ==
Ain't it Cool News called Clinger "an unconventional and exciting film that doesn't forget the serious themes it is depicting," and Nerdly gave the film 4 out of 5 stars, calling it a "stunning debut feature." HorrorNews.net gave Clinger a mostly favorable review, stating that it was "a pretty enjoyable film" and that "it doesn’t necessarily stand up to criticism, but it’s good enough if you’re looking for a something that doesn’t take itself too seriously." Dread Central expressed similar sentiments in their review, as they felt that "When all was said and done, Clinger will prove to amuse the lightest of horror/comedy fans with its moments of casual laughter and vanilla gore, but for the rest of you genre aficionados, I’d request an order of protection against this adhesive specter."

The Hollywood Reporter was more critical in their review with the bottom line statement "DOA” is one way to describe this indie misfire."

=== Awards ===
- Grand Jury Prize for Best Narrative Feature at the Slamdance Film Festival (2015, nominated)
- Shriekfest Award for Best Horror Comedy Feature at Shriekfest (2015, won)
- Best Horror Comedy Feature at Atlanta Horror Film Festival (2015, won)
