= Michael St. Gerard =

American actor

- Born: January 22, 1961 (age 65); New York, U.S.
- Occupations: Actor, pastor
- Years active: 1987–1994

Michael St. Gerard (born January 22, 1961) is an American former actor.

== Career ==
St. Gerard started by appearing in Japanese commercials and off-Broadway shows. His first movie was 1987's Senior Week. He is most recognized for his role as Link Larkin in John Waters's Hairspray (1988).

In 1989, St. Gerard starred in two movies in which he portrayed Elvis Presley: Heart of Dixie and Great Balls of Fire!. His portrayal of Elvis in both films led him to being cast a third time as young Elvis in the 1990 TV series Elvis, appearing in all 10 episodes. He also appeared in 1993 as Elvis's mirror image in the penultimate episode of Quantum Leap, titled "Memphis Melody."

He later appeared as an acting teacher in the second season of Beverly Hills, 90210. He then made a few direct-to-video films, including Into the Sun (1992), Live Wire, and Replikator (1994)

In 1994, St. Gerard had a spiritual awakening after leading a Sunday School class, and after it, he decided to retire from acting at age 33 to focus on religious instruction. He became a pastor in the Harlem area of New York City, extending himself and his church in particular to inner-city youths. As of 2014, he still was working as a pastor at the Harlem Square Church.

== Filmography ==
Year	Title	Role	Notes
1987	Senior Week	Everett	
1988	Hairspray	Link Larkin	
1989	Great Balls of Fire!	Elvis Presley	
1989	Heart of Dixie	Elvis Presley	
1990	Elvis	Elvis Presley	13-episode miniseries
1990	ABC Afterschool Special	Bobby Stewart	Episode: "Over the Limit"
1991	Life Goes On	Jed Chandler	Episode: "Head Over Heels"
1991	Beverly Hills, 90210	Chris Suiter	4 episodes
1992	Star Time	Henry Pinkle	
1992	Into the Sun	Lt. Wolf	
1992	Live Wire	Ben	
1993	Quantum Leap	Elvis Presley	Episode: "Memphis Melody – July 3, 1954"
1993	Based on an Untrue Story	Crack	Television film
1994	Law & Order	Kent Halliwell	Episode: "Golden Years"
1994	Replikator	Ludo Ludovic	
