= Grant Shaud =

American actor

- Born: Edward Grant Shaud III; October 17, 1960 (age 65); Evanston, Illinois, U.S.
- Education: University of Richmond (BS)
- Occupation: Actor
- Years active: 1983–present

Edward Grant Shaud III (born October 17, 1960) is an American actor best known for his portrayal of the character of Miles Silverberg on the television sitcom Murphy Brown. He's also had notable roles in the films The Distinguished Gentleman and Antz, among other voice performances in The Wild Thornberrys, Godzilla: The Series and Batman: The Animated Series.

== Early life ==
Edward Grant Shaud III was born in Evanston, Illinois, the son of Anna Barbara (née Dougherty) and Edward Grant Shaud Jr. His family is Irish Catholic. He attended Conestoga High School in Berwyn, Pennsylvania, and graduated in 1979. In 1983, he graduated with a journalism degree from the University of Richmond, where he was a member of Sigma Alpha Epsilon.

== Career ==
In 1984, Shaud moved to New York City to begin working in theater. His first acting role in television was as a guest character named Jack on Kate & Allie, who was a college student and director on a local cable channel. In 1988, he began as Miles Silverberg on Murphy Brown. He lived with co-star Jane Leeves before and during her guest stint on the show, in which she concurrently played his girlfriend. He left in 1996 to pursue other projects, with his producer role on the show taken by Lily Tomlin. On February 26, 2018, it was announced that Shaud would return to a revival series of Murphy Brown with former co-stars Candice Bergen, Faith Ford and Joe Regalbuto.

In recent years, Shaud has done some voiceover work in animation, most notably the television series Batman: The Animated Series. He had a guest role on The Drew Carey Show as a character named Jack, who believed himself to be the devil. He also played Alex Rosetti on the sitcom Madigan Men, starring Gabriel Byrne.

== Selected filmography ==
=== Television ===
Year	Title	Role	Notes
1986	Kate & Allie	Jack	2 episodes
1988–1996, 2018	Murphy Brown	Miles Silverberg	212 episodes
1990	Murder, She Wrote	Woody Perkins	Episode: "Where Have You Gone, Billy Boy?"
1994	Batman: The Animated Series	Harry Loomis / Pack Rat (voice)	Episode: "Make 'Em Laugh"
1996	The Drew Carey Show	Jack	Episode: "The Devil, You Say"
1997	Lois & Clark: The New Adventures of Superman	Harold Kripstly / Toyman	Episode: "Toy Story"
1997	Dead Man's Gun	Robert Gosgrove	Episode: "Highway Man"
1998	From the Earth to the Moon	Bob Carbee	Episode: "Spider"
1998	Godzilla: The Series	Felix Hoenikker (voice)	Episode: "Talkin' Trash"
1999	The Wild Thornberrys	Mr. Culpepper (voice)	Episode: "The Dragon and the Professor"
2000	Madigan Men	Alex Rosetti	12 episodes
2002	Touched by an Angel	Ed	Episode: "The Sixteenth Minute"
2003–2004	Oliver Beene	Jerry Beene	24 episodes
2007	Pushing Daisies	Steve Kaiser	Episode: "Corpsicle"
2008	Law & Order	Dr. Hoffman	Episode: "Misbegotten"
2008	Medium	Leo Crane	Episode: "Burn Baby Burn"
2008	Louie	Eddie Faye	Episode: "Halloween/Ellie"
2011	Curb Your Enthusiasm	Henry Horn	Episode: "Car Periscope"
2012	Law & Order: Special Victims Unit	Theater Critic	Episode: "Theater Tricks"
2012	The Good Wife	Judge Etts	Episode: "Waiting for the Knock"
2016–2018	Younger	Bob Katz	5 episodes

=== Film ===
Year	Title	Role	Notes
1992	The Distinguished Gentleman	Arthur Reinhardt	
1997	Men Seeking Women	Les	
1998	Antz	Foreman (voice)	
2000	The Crow: Salvation	Peter Walsh	
2006	Waltzing Anna	JD Reno	
2016	The American Side	Professor	
2023	Among the Beasts	Detective Mulberry	

=== Theater ===
- Torch Song Trilogy, Broadway, 1986
- Today, I Am a Fountain Pen as Pete Lisanti, Theater 890, 1986
- Writer's Block as David, Atlantic Theater, 2003
- After Ashley as David, Vineyard Theatre, 2005
- Thicker than Water (multiple roles), Ensemble Studio Theatre, 2008
- Relatively Speaking (multiple roles), Brooks Atkinson Theater, 2011
