= The Pallbearer =

1996 film directed by Matt Reeves

- Theatrical release poster
- Directed by: Matt Reeves
- Written by: Matt Reeves; Jason Katims
- Produced by: J. J. Abrams; Paul Webster
- Starring: David Schwimmer; Gwyneth Paltrow; Michael Rapaport; Toni Collette; Carol Kane; Bitty Schram; Barbara Hershey
- Cinematography: Robert Elswit
- Edited by: Stan Salfas
- Music by: Stewart Copeland
- Distributed by: Miramax Films
- Release date: May 3, 1996
- Running time: 94 minutes
- Country: United States
- Language: English
- Budget: $8 million
- Box office: $5 million

The Pallbearer is a 1996 American romantic comedy film co-written and directed by Matt Reeves in his directorial debut and starring David Schwimmer, Gwyneth Paltrow, Toni Collette, Michael Vartan, Michael Rapaport, and Barbara Hershey. It was screened in the Un Certain Regard section at the 1996 Cannes Film Festival. and received unfavorable reviews.

== Plot ==
Tom Thompson still lives with his mother a year after getting his degree in architecture. A former high school classmate's mother, Ruth Abernathy, calls to say his "best friend", Bill, died by suicide, asking him to give his eulogy. Not remembering him, he nevertheless agrees to be a pallbearer. Meanwhile, his high school crush, Julie DeMarco, reappears in town.

At the funeral, Tom's vague and impersonal eulogy confuses the Abernathys and amuses his friends. Julie, upset at their disrespect, tries to leave as they carry Bill's casket out of the church. Tom drags the casket and the rest of the pallbearers after Julie. Upon being asked if she knew Bill, she admits she didn't but was saddened to see him in the casket. Asking her out upsets Bill's relatives, so he's forcefully relieved of his duties as pallbearer. Visibly upset, Ruth tells Tom he is in Bill's will.

Afterwards, Tom calls Julie and she requests Scott and Cynthia come along for a double date. At dinner, Julie and Scott click, while conversation between Tom and Julie is stilted. Scott mentions that Tom still lives with his mother. Disgusted by Scott, Tom reluctantly drives Julie home. Arriving, she reveals she remembers him in high school. As Tom leans in for a kiss, Julie turns and they knock heads. She apologizes for giving off the wrong signals, as she is moving away.

Rejected at his second job interview, Tom goes to Ruth's to help pack Bill's room. Looking through old photos of Bill, they kiss and have sex. She tells him about Bill's father, who died in the war. Tom tells Ruth about Bill's fictitious love interest based completely on his own infatuation with Julie, and they continue to see each other.

Tom spies on Julie working at a record store from his car. One day, at closing time, he sees her let Scott into the store, who then kisses her. When Scott sees Tom, he drives off. The next morning, Julie tells Tom about Scott's kiss, not knowing he had witnessed it. Reminiscing about high school band, she tells him she wants to just drive away for a year to be on her own. Julie then invites Tom to a concert. Arriving at Ruth's, Tom is rushed to an Abernathy family gathering. He realizes Ruth had overheard him talking to Julie about their date later that evening. When Tom's car breaks down, Julie finds Ruth's charm bracelet, so he tells her he has been helping Bill Abernathy's mother since the funeral. She mistakenly assumes it's a platonic friendship.

After a tow truck takes Tom and Julie back to his house, as he sneaks into his mother's room to get her car keys, she enters his room. Tom reveals he once wanted to dance with her at a school dance and she kisses him. Falling into Tom's bed, Ruth calls, knowing Julie is there with him. When Tom seeks advice from Brad, he suggests mailing the bracelet with a letter to end things with Ruth. He does so and continues dating Julie. On her birthday, she asks him to meet her parents. That morning, Tom sees Ruth with the envelope and sneaks away. At brunch with Julie's parents, her father disapproves of them. As Tom begs Julie to not leave for a year, Ruth barges into the restaurant, humiliating him.

At Brad's bachelor party, Tom makes a scene, telling him not to marry Lauren, calling her an albatross around his neck and that Scott agrees. The next day, Scott apologizes to Tom and they reconcile. Talking about their childhood, they realize there was another Tom who moved away after junior high. So Tom brings the other Tom to Ruth, who appreciates the gesture to reminisce about her son. They both realize they needed someone at the time, Ruth mourning her son and Tom pining for his childhood crush.

At Brad's wedding, Tom patches his friendship with Brad approving of his marriage to Lauren, as Scott and Cynthia also reconcile. Tom also gives Julie his car keys for her trip. She hints that she wants to dance. Tom gets a job and moves into Julie's apartment while she is on her trip.

== Cast ==
- David Schwimmer as Tom Thompson
- Gwyneth Paltrow as Julie DeMarco
- Michael Rapaport as Brad
- Toni Collette as Cynthia
- Carol Kane as Tom's Mom
- Michael Vartan as Scott
- Bitty Schram as Lauren
- Jean DeBaer as Suzanne DeMarco
- Elizabeth Franz as Aunt Lucille
- Mark Margolis as Philip DeMarco
- Barbara Hershey as Ruth Abernathy

== Production ==
Miramax Films won an auction in October 1994 for the spec script written by Reeves and Jason Katims, initially paying $400,000. Reeves was known for co-writing Under Siege 2: Dark Territory and Katims as a story editor on the television show My So-Called Life. J. J. Abrams supervised the writers during the writing process and co-produced the film.

== Reception ==
=== Box office ===
The Pallbearer opened at number 9 at the US box office in its opening weekend (5/3-5) with $2,319,236. By the end of its run, the film had made $5,656,388 in the United States and Canada.

=== Critical reception ===
The review aggregation site Rotten Tomatoes reported that 48% of critics have given the film a positive review based on 21 reviews, with an average rating of 5.1/10. The consensus summarizes: "Between a dark comedy and a romantic one, The Pallbearer confounds, and David Schwimmer's puppy dog eyes can't save the procession from going six feet under."
