= The Church (2018 film) =

- Directed by: Dom Frank
- Written by: Dom Frank
- Produced by: Gia Aaron; Josh Aaron; Dom Frank; Robin Franklin; Paul Irwin; Matthew Nadu
- Starring: Bill Moseley; Ashley C. Williams; Lisa Wilcox; Keith Stallworth; Clint Howard
- Cinematography: Tom Fanelle
- Edited by: Ed Marx
- Music by: Miles Bergsma
- Production company: Hard Floor Entertainment
- Release date: October 5, 2018
- Running time: 87 minutes
- Country: United States
- Language: English

The Church is an American horror film written and directed by Dom Frank. It stars Bill Moseley, Ashley C. Williams, Lisa Wilcox, Keith Stallwortch, and Clint Howard.

== Synopsis ==
The church board and the development team come face to face with a supernatural presence when they agree to sell the church.

== Cast ==
- Bill Moseley as Pastor James
- Ashley C. Williams as Elizabeth Haines
- Lisa Wilcox as Joan Laurels
- Keith Stallworth as Simon Adu
- Clint Howard as Alexander James / The Spirit
- Vito LoGrasso as Adrian Seltzer
- Victoria Gates as Jennifer Lawson
- Deitra Leak as Melanie Banks
- Holly Zuelle as Veronica Leeks

== Reception ==
Sherilyn Connelly of SF Weekly wrote that film is "far from great, but it’s never boring, and that’s good enough for the faithful." In a mixed review for Los Angeles Times, Noel Murray wrote "There’s an appealing, old-school crumminess to the supernatural thriller “The Church,” the kind of micro-budgeted bad movie that may exist only because the filmmaker had access to a location and wrote a story to accommodate it." Murray then criticized the acting, writing "Frank doesn’t really have the budget — or the cast — to make the horror elements in “The Church” effective. Most of the actors are inexperienced and stiff; whenever they're supposed to be tormented by the paranormal, the special effects meant to illustrate the hauntings are either nonexistent or cheesy."

In a negative review for Variety, Dennis Harvey criticized the writing, direction, and special effects, stating that "Those limitations could conceivably lend a certain charm if the movie had energy, audacity, and a few good ideas — things present in such even-lower-budgeted Christian screen parables of damnation as Ron Ormond’s 1974 “The Burning Hell.” But Frank's script is half-baked and his direction lethargic. Much of the highly clunky dialogue is beyond certain cast members’ abilities to smooth over."

== Release ==
The film received a limited theatrical release in 30 theaters on October 5, 2018.
