= Star Time (film) =

1992 American film

- Original video artwork
- Directed by: Alexander Cassini
- Written by: Alexander Cassini
- Produced by: Alexander Cassini
- Starring: Michael St. Gerard; John P. Ryan; Maureen Teefy
- Cinematography: Fernando Arguelles
- Edited by: Stan Salfas
- Music by: Blake Leyh
- Distributed by: Northern Arts Entertainment
- Release dates: January 20, 1992 (Sundance); April 2, 1993 (Los Angeles)
- Running time: 84 minutes
- Country: United States
- Language: English

Star Time is a 1992 American drama slasher film written, produced, and directed by Alexander Cassini, and starring Michael St. Gerard and Maureen Teefy. Its plot follows a young man in Los Angeles who has a psychological breakdown after the cancellation of his favorite television show, leading him to go on a murder spree.

== Plot ==
Los Angeles outcast Henry Pinkle is obsessed with television, and becomes suicidal when his favorite sitcom, The Robertson Family, is canceled. Planning on ending his life by jumping from a bridge, he is approached by the mysterious Sam Bones, an elderly man who offers to jump with him before eventually talking him out of the act. Later, Sam inexplicably appears in Henry's living room, and tells him he will no longer be alone.

Wendy, Henry's social worker, receives a videotape of him informing her of his suicide, which he mailed to her before the botched attempt. Sam promises he can make Henry a star, and brings him to a television studio lot where Henry watches a faceless woman on a screen instruct him to follow his "destiny." Sam gives Henry a plastic baby doll mask and a hatchet before sending him to make his "debut" at a suburban residence. He breaks into the home intending to murder the homeowner, but becomes transfixed by the television set, and fails to commit the murder. Sam informs him that killing the homeowner will result in his sainthood, after which Henry returns to the house and hacks the owner to death with the hatchet.

Over the following month, a series of fifteen hatchet murders occur in Los Angeles. Wendy realizes Henry is still alive, and goes to visit him; he tells her of his new "manager," Sam, and she plans to meet with him. Sam, however, is reluctant that Wendy will understand their "mission." When Wendy attempts to locate Sam with the address given to her by Henry, she finds the address does not exist. When she confronts Henry with the notion that Sam is a product of his mind, he becomes enraged. Later, Wendy finds her sister Julie murdered in her apartment.

Henry locks Wendy inside the apartment and goes to confront Sam, whom he blames for committing Julie's murder. Wendy manages to break through a wall, accessing the apartment next-door, where she finds the neighbors also murdered. After she slips on a puddle of blood, she is knocked unconscious, after which Sam arrives and attempts to strangle her. Henry enters the apartment and thwart's Sam's attempt, saving Wendy's life. He brings her to the roof of the apartment building, where he attempts to fight Sam. When Wendy exclaims that Sam is not real, Henry puts on the baby face mask, and accosts her with the hatchet. He nearly strikes her, but instead leaps from the building to the ground below.

Paramedics arrive and find Henry barely alive. Wendy enters his apartment, which is plastered with images indicating his delusions, including a poster of a house resembling Sam's. On his television set, Wendy watches a live broadcast of paramedics attempting to revive him. He utters the phrase "I'm on TV," before dying on live television.

== Cast ==
- Michael St. Gerard as Henry Pinkle
- John P. Ryan as Sam Bones
- Maureen Teefy as Wendy
- Thomas Newman as Night Watchman
- Dana Dentine as Newscaster #1
- Robert Resnick as Newscaster #2
- Angel Santana as Newscaster #3
- Reza Mizbani as Anchorman
- Don Pemrick as Anchorman
- Duncan Roulend as Newscaster in Editing Room

== Release ==
The film premiered at the 1992 Sundance Film Festival, and later screened at the Nuart Theatre in Los Angeles in April 1993.

=== Home media ===
According to Filmmaker, Star Time was released on VHS through Fox Lorber in the summer of 1992.

=== Critical reception ===
Jonathan Rosenbaum of the Chicago Reader recommended the film, describing it as "An exceedingly odd first feature..." Kevin Thomas of the Los Angeles Times praised the film's acting, deeming it "an impressively ambitious and potent first feature, an often surreal parable, in the form of a film noir, on the impact of TV on a disturbed individual."
