= Stan Salfas =

Stan Salfas is an American film and television editor who has been active since the mid-1980s. Salfas and William Hoy won Satellite Awards for Best Editing for the films Dawn of the Planet of the Apes (2014) and War for the Planet of the Apes (2017), both directed by Matt Reeves. Salfas is a member of American Cinema Editors (ACE).

Salfas began his career in New York before moving to Los Angeles, where he worked in both feature films and television. He collaborated with Reeves on the film The Pallbearer (1996) and later served as supervising editor and occasional director on the series Felicity (1998–2001), created by Reeves and J. J. Abrams. Salfas's television work also included pilots for Gideon's Crossing and Alias.

== Credits ==
Salfas's editing credits for film
Year	Title	Notes	Ref.
1983	The Great Performance	Short	
1985	Metropolitan Avenue		
1986	Hotshot		
1988	Spike of Bensonhurst		
1992	Star Time		
1993	Quick		
1995	The Underneath		
1996	The Pallbearer		
1998	Clay Pigeons		
2000	2 ÷ 3	Short	
2010	Let Me In		
2010	Morning	Theatrical release in 2013	
2012	Chernobyl Diaries		
2012	Tomorrow You're Gone		
2014	Dawn of the Planet of the Apes	Edited with William Hoy	
2016	Now You See Me 2		
2017	War for the Planet of the Apes	Edited with William Hoy	
2018	Brooklyn Roses		
2021	Venom: Let There Be Carnage	Edited with Maryann Brandon	
2024	The Deliverance		

Salfas's editing credits for television
Year(s)	Title	Notes	Ref.
1985	Three Sovereigns for Sarah	1 episode	
1985	American Playhouse	1 episode	
1989	CBS Schoolbreak Special	1 episode	
1992	Empire City	TV movie	
1992	Lifestories: Families in Crisis	1 episode	
1993	Wild Palms	TV miniseries, 5 episodes	
1993–1995	Fallen Angels	6 episodes	
1994	New Eden	TV movie	
1996	Woman Undone	TV movie	
1997–1999	Cracker: Mind Over Murder	4 episodes	
1998–2001	Felicity	22 episodes	
2000	Gideon's Crossing	1 episode	
2001	Alias	1 episode	
2003	Miracles	5 episodes	
2003–2004	One Tree Hill	9 episodes	
2005	Jonny Zero	1 episode	
2005	Numb3rs	3 episodes	
2005	Tru Calling	2 episodes	
2006	Windfall	1 episode	
2006–2007	Six Degrees	2 episodes	
2006	Firestorm: Last Stand at Yellowstone	TV movie	
2013	Beauty and the Beast	2 episodes	
2015	Down Dog	TV short	

== Accolades ==
Salfas's accolades for film
Year	Film	Editor(s)	Award	Ceremony	Result	Ref.
2014	Dawn of the Planet of the Apes	Salfas, William Hoy	Satellite Award for Best Editing	February 15, 2015	Won	
2017	War for the Planet of the Apes	Salfas, William Hoy	Satellite Award for Best Editing	February 11, 2018	Won	

Salfas's accolades for television
Year	TV series	Editor(s)	Award	Ceremony	Result	Ref.
1999	Felicity (pilot)	Salfas, Warren Bowman	American Cinema Editors Award for Best Edited One-Hour Series for Television	1999	Nominated	
2002	Alias (pilot)	Salfas, Quincy Z. Gunderson	American Cinema Editors Award for Best Edited One-Hour Series for Television	2002	Nominated	
