= Creed III =

2023 film by Michael B. Jordan

- Theatrical release poster
- Directed by: Michael B. Jordan
- Screenplay by: Keenan Coogler; Zach Baylin
- Story by: Ryan Coogler; Keenan Coogler; Zach Baylin
- Based on: Characters by Sylvester Stallone
- Produced by: Irwin Winkler; Charles Winkler; William Chartoff; David Winkler; Ryan Coogler; Michael B. Jordan; Elizabeth Raposo; Jonathan Glickman; Sylvester Stallone
- Starring: Michael B. Jordan; Tessa Thompson; Jonathan Majors; Wood Harris; Mila Davis-Kent; Florian Munteanu; Phylicia Rashad
- Cinematography: Kramer Morgenthau
- Edited by: Tyler Nelson; Jessica Baclesse
- Music by: Joseph Shirley
- Production companies: Metro-Goldwyn-Mayer Pictures; Chartoff Productions; Proximity Media; Outlier Society
- Distributed by: Metro-Goldwyn-Mayer Pictures (United States); Warner Bros. Pictures (International)
- Release dates: February 9, 2023 (Mexico City); March 3, 2023 (United States)
- Running time: 116 minutes
- Country: United States
- Languages: English; American Sign Language
- Budget: $75 million
- Box office: $276.1 million

Creed III is a 2023 American sports drama film starring and directed by Michael B. Jordan in his directorial debut, and produced by Jordan, Irwin Winkler, Charles Winkler, William Chartoff, David Winkler, Ryan Coogler, Elizabeth Raposo, Jonathan Glickman and Sylvester Stallone. It is the sequel to Creed II (2018), the third installment in the Creed film series, and the ninth overall in the Rocky franchise. The film was written by Keenan Coogler and Zach Baylin from a story they co-wrote with Ryan Coogler. The film sees the accomplished and recently retired boxer Adonis Creed (portrayed by Jordan) come face-to-face with his childhood friend and former boxing prodigy Damian Anderson (Jonathan Majors). Tessa Thompson, Wood Harris, Mila Davis-Kent, Florian Munteanu, and Phylicia Rashad also star.

A third Creed film was officially announced in September 2019, alongside Jordan's return; he was also confirmed to be making his directorial debut in October 2020, making this the fifth film in the series to be directed by the lead actor, following Rocky II, Rocky III, Rocky IV, and Rocky Balboa, which were directed by Sylvester Stallone, who played the title character in the first six films before reprising it for the last two times in Creed and Creed II. Majors and the remainder of the cast joined between November 2021 and September 2022; Creed III is the first film in the series not to feature Stallone reprising his role as Rocky Balboa, though he remained as a producer. Principal photography began in January 2022 and lasted until that April, with filming locations including Los Angeles, Tampa, and Georgia.

Creed III premiered in Mexico City on February 9, 2023, which coincided with Jordan's 36th birthday, and was released in the United States on March 3. It is the first film distributed by Metro-Goldwyn-Mayer by themselves to not have the United Artists Releasing logo since The Hustle (2019). The film received positive reviews from critics for Jordan's direction, the story, performances and fighting sequences. Like its predecessors, the film was a box office success, grossing $276.1 million worldwide, making it the highest-grossing Creed film and the second highest grossing Rocky film. A sequel is in development.

== Plot ==
In 2002, Adonis "Donnie" Creed sneaks out with Golden Gloves champion "Diamond" Dame Anderson, to watch him compete in an underground boxing match in Los Angeles. After Dame's victory, he tells Donnie about his aspirations to turn professional and become a world champion. During a detour at a liquor store, Donnie impulsively attacks a man named Leon, and Dame is arrested while Donnie escapes, running away from the scene. After Dame was arrested, Donnie never contacted Dame again.

In 2024, six years after defeating Viktor Drago (Note: As depicted in Creed II (2018)) and three years after defeating Ricky Conlan in South Africa to avenge his only career defeat, (Note: As depicted in Creed (2015); the film erroneously states the fight took place in 2017) Donnie has retired from boxing to focus on his wife Bianca and their six-year-old daughter Amara, whose hearing impairment has since led the family to become fluent in American Sign Language. Donnie runs the Delphi Boxing Academy with Tony "Little Duke" Evers Jr. and is promoting his protégé, world champion Felix "El Guerrero" Chavez, in a match against Drago. While the two watch the declining health of Donnie's adoptive mother Mary-Anne, Amara aspires to become a boxer like Donnie, which gets her into trouble at school when she attacks a bully.

Released from prison, Dame reconnects with Donnie and shares his desire to resume his boxing career. Donnie reluctantly invites Dame to the gym, and hires him as Chavez's sparring partner, but his presence draws scorn from Chavez and Duke as Dame is overly aggressive and hostile. Dame later visits Donnie's home, where he meets his family and recounts their time together at a group home, a story that Bianca had never heard. Privately, Dame asks for a title shot against Chavez, but Donnie declines. After Drago is attacked by an unknown assailant at a party for Bianca's record label, which casts doubt on his ability to participate in his upcoming boxing match, Donnie nominates Dame as Drago's replacement. Despite it being his first professional bout, Dame manages to win the unified heavyweight championship in a third round knockout by implementing dirty tactics such as a knee and elbow, as well as targeting Chavez's shoulder (which Dame had intentionally damaged during one of their sparring sessions), leaving Chavez in serious condition and Duke furious with Creed.

Following the match, an uneasy Donnie visits Mary-Anne, who shows him years' worth of letters Dame had written to Donnie while in prison, which she kept from him due to her believing that Dame was a bad influence. Donnie is furious for her making Dame think he would abandon him. One letter contains a picture showing Dame with a fellow inmate he recognized as Drago's attacker. Realizing that Dame planned the attack, Donnie confronts him, and Dame admits that he manipulated him into getting the title shot. He strikes Donnie on the beach and cuts his eye, while taunting him. Donnie is unable to open up to Bianca about his and Mary-Anne's complicity in hurting Dame. Dame revels in his newfound fame and publicly calls Donnie a fraud who turned a blind eye on him.

Mary-Anne suffers another stroke and eventually dies. After her funeral, Donnie confesses to Bianca about the night of Dame's arrest, revealing Leon to be the abusive caregiver and true mastermind in their group home before he was adopted. When Donnie attacked Leon at the liquor store, Leon's friends started beating Donnie, which caused Dame to brandish a gun to save Donnie.

Publicly taunted by Dame and encouraged by Bianca, Donnie decides to come out of retirement and challenges Dame for the championship, which he accepts. After training with Duke and a recovered Drago, Donnie faces Dame in the "Battle of Los Angeles" at Dodger Stadium. The fight is a grueling, evenly matched affair. In the final round, Donnie has flashbacks of his disjointing group home and Dame's life in jail, which leads to Donnie being knocked down. He manages to just get back up before the count, then goes on to knock Dame out and regain the championship. Afterward, Donnie reconciles with Dame, with both men admitting it was not the other's fault. Donnie then joins Bianca and Amara in the ring in the empty stadium, where he shadowboxes with Amara.

== Cast ==
- Michael B. Jordan as Adonis "Donnie" Creed (né Johnson)
  - Thaddeus J. Mixon as the 15-year-old Donnie
- Tessa Thompson as Bianca Taylor-Creed
- Jonathan Majors as Damian "Diamond Dame" Anderson
  - Spence Moore II as the 18-year-old Dame
- Wood Harris as Tony "Little Duke" Evers
- Mila Davis-Kent as Amara Creed
- Florian Munteanu as Viktor Drago
- Phylicia Rashad as Mary Anne Creed
- José Benavidez Jr. as Felix Chavez
- Selenis Leyva as Laura Chavez
- Anthony Bellew as "Pretty" Ricky Conlan

Additionally, Barry Pepper provides the narration for the televised "Anderson v Chavez" promo, while boxer Terence Crawford also appears as Lorenzo "Nightmare" Jones, a sparring partner. Sports television personality Stephen A. Smith, news anchor Jessica Holmes, boxer Canelo Álvarez and his wife Fernanda Gómez, and singer Kehlani make cameo appearances as themselves. Also appearing as themselves are: boxing referees Kenny Bayless, Russell Mora and Tony Weeks; ring announcers Jimmy Lennon Jr. and David Diamante; and broadcasters Todd Grisham, Jessica McCaskill, Al Bernstein, Mauro Ranallo, and Christopher Mannix. Michael B. Jordan's father, Michael A. Jordan, also cameos as a Golden Gloves referee.

== Production ==
=== Development ===
In December 2018, in response to the suggestion that Deontay Wilder could play the son of Clubber Lang in a potential sequel to Creed II (2018), Sylvester Stallone and Michael B. Jordan expressed interest. In September 2019, Jordan confirmed that Creed III was officially in active development.

=== Pre-production ===
In February 2020, Zach Baylin was announced as screenwriter, with Jordan confirmed to reprise his role as Adonis Creed. In October 2020, it was reported that Jordan would reprise his role of Adonis Creed and make his directorial debut in Creed III. Producers had expressed interest in having Jordan serve as director, with Irwin Winkler stating that he had personally offered the position to the actor. In April 2021, Stallone announced he was not cast in the film. By June 2021, Jonathan Majors entered talks to portray Adonis's new adversary. In November 2021, it was officially confirmed that Majors was cast. In April 2022, it was announced that Wood Harris and Florian Munteanu would reprise their roles from previous Creed films, and Selenis Leyva, Thaddeus J. Mixson, Spence Moore II, and Mila Davis-Kent joined the cast. In September 2022, Mexican boxer Canelo Álvarez was cast in as a cameo.

Stallone expressed distaste for the darker direction the filmmakers wanted to take the film in, stating: "That's a regretful situation because I know what it could have been. It was taken in a direction that is quite different than I would've taken it. It's a different philosophy — Irwin Winkler's and Michael B. Jordan's. I wish them well, but I'm much more of a sentimentalist. I like my heroes getting beat up, but I just don't want them going into that dark space. I just feel people have enough darkness." Jordan meanwhile wanted to explore Adonis' early life & backstory. Stallone refused to see the released film due to the involvement of Winkler, whom Stallone has called a "parasite" for "picking clean the bones" of characters he (Stallone) created. Winkler purchased the rights for the Rocky character from Stallone in 1976.

=== Filming ===
Principal photography began in late January 2022, and Jordan was seen on the set in Atlanta, Georgia. Kramer Morgenthau returned as the cinematographer for the film, after having done so for Creed II. The film was partially shot on IMAX-certified Sony CineAlta Venice cameras and the Panavision anamorphic format, making this the first film in the series, and the first sports film in history, to do so. Filming later ended on April 6, 2022.

Jordan said the fight choreography was heavily influenced by anime series such as Megalobox, Naruto Shippuden, Hajime No Ippo, and Dragon Ball Z.

=== Post-production ===
In May 2022, the final writing credits were officiated. Ryan Coogler (director and co-writer of Creed, executive producer on Creed II, and producer on Creed III) received story credit with Keenan Coogler and Baylin, and the latter two received screenplay credit. Tyler Nelson and Jessica Baclesse served as co-editors.

== Music ==
=== Soundtrack ===
In October 2022, it was announced that composer Joseph Shirley would score Creed III. Shirley was previously part of Ludwig Göransson's team scoring the first two films in the series, as a technical score engineer and score programmer. On November 20, 2022, Jordan announced that J. Cole and Dreamville executive produced the soundtrack.

== Release ==
=== Theatrical ===
Creed III premiered in Mexico City on February 9, 2023, and was released in the United States on March 3. It was originally scheduled to be theatrically released on November 23, 2022, by Metro-Goldwyn-Mayer (MGM) in the United States, and Warner Bros. Pictures internationally (excluding Scandinavia), but on July 28, it was delayed to March 3.

It is the first MGM film to not have the United Artists Releasing logo since Fighting with My Family (2019) after Amazon shut down the distributor's operations and folded it into MGM earlier in 2023.

=== Home media ===
Creed III was released on premium video-on-demand services on April 1, 2023. The film was released for Blu-ray, DVD, and 4K UHD on May 23, 2023.

== Reception ==
=== Box office ===
In the United States and Canada, Creed III grossed $156.2 million, with $119.9 million in other territories, for a worldwide total of $276.1 million, against a budget of $75 million. It opened at No. 1, its first of six consecutive weeks in the Top 10 at the domestic box office.

=== Critical response ===
On the review aggregator website Rotten Tomatoes, 89% of 341 critics' reviews are positive, with an average rating of 7.1/10. The website's consensus reads: "Stepping out from Rocky Balboa's iconic shadow at last, the Creed franchise reasserts its champion status thanks to star Michael B. Jordan's punchy direction and a nuanced heel turn by Jonathan Majors." Metacritic, which uses a weighted average, assigned the film a score of 73 out of 100, based on 62 critics, indicating "generally favorable" reviews.

Lovia Gyarkye of The Hollywood Reporter praised the fighting sequences and said: "If we take its claims at face value, Creed III is a rousing success, a slick, cool and inspiring narrative about boxing's prince trying to defend his title and honor." Chicago Sun-Times's Richard Roeper gave the film three out of four stars, writing "What makes Creed III a consistently engrossing watch is the gritty and violent back story, and the present-day tension between two former best friends whose lives were forever changed by a single confrontation that went sideways and who now have been reunited after nearly 20 years, with one man on top of the world and the other about two degrees from reaching the boiling point as he simmers with rage and resentment."

=== Accolades ===
At the 2023 MTV Movie & TV Awards, Creed III was nominated for Best Performance in a Movie (Jordan). It received a nomination for Best Viral Campaign for a Feature Film at the 2023 Golden Trailer Awards. The film and Jordan was respectively nominated for Best Picture and Best Actor at the 6th Hollywood Critics Association Midseason Film Awards. At the Black Reel Awards of 2024 the film received four nominations: Outstanding Director and Outstanding Lead Performance to Jordan, Outstanding Supporting Performance to Majors and Outstanding Soundtrack.

== Future ==
On February 2, 2023, Jordan confirmed that a fourth Creed film was happening "for sure" and that spin-offs were also being considered. When asked about the future of the Creed movie franchise in an interview with ScreenRant Plus, Jordan said:

But you will see the Creed-verse continue to grow and expand. I think that we invested in some really interesting characters that I think a lot of people were responding to. I have to give a political answer to that. [laughs] There's going to be more of the Creed family, and there's gonna be more of some of the characters that you love from this movie. I just don't know what package it's going to be in yet.

In November 2023, Winkler confirmed that a fourth film was in active development, with Jordan returning as director. Jordan has also expressed interest in Stallone returning for a fourth film, believing there was always space for Rocky to return. In March 2025, Jordan told The Hollywood Reporter, "I would like to work with [Jonathan] Majors again. I would love to make Creed IV together — among other projects."

== See also ==
- List of boxing films
- List of films featuring the deaf and hard of hearing
