= Madigan Men =

- Created by: Cindy Chupack
- Starring: Gabriel Byrne; Roy Dotrice; Grant Shaud; John Hensley; Sabrina Lloyd
- Opening theme: Father's Son, performed by Young Dubliners
- Composers: Scott Schreer; Phil Garrod; Reed Hays
- Country of origin: United States
- Original language: English
- No. of seasons: 1
- No. of episodes: 12 (3 unaired)

Production
- Executive producers: Cindy Chupack; Marc Flanagan; James Burrows; Gabriel Byrne; Richard Dresser; Tom Leopold
- Running time: 30 minutes
- Production companies: Chupack Productions; Artists Television Group; Touchstone Television

Original release
- Network: ABC
- Release: October 6 – December 15, 2000

Madigan Men is an American sitcom that premiered on ABC on October 6, 2000. The show was put on hiatus in December 2000 in the midst of cast and crew changes, and was later cancelled after one season.

== Cast ==
- Gabriel Byrne as Ben Madigan
- Roy Dotrice as Seamus Madigan
- John Hensley as Luke Madigan
- Grant Shaud as Alex Rosetti
- Sabrina Lloyd as Wendy Lipton

Wendy Lipton, the secretary, was played by Clea Lewis in the pilot, but was replaced by Sabrina Lloyd after that.

== Episodes ==
| No. | Title | Directed by | Written by | Original release date | Prod. code |
|---|---|---|---|---|---|
| 1 | "Pilot" | James Burrows | Cindy Chupack | October 6, 2000 | 01000 |
| 2 | "Irish Men Can't Jump" | Barnet Kellman | Richard Dresser | October 13, 2000 | 01002 |
| 3 | "Dearly Deported" | Barnet Kellman | Tom Leopold | October 20, 2000 | 01004 |
| 4 | "Love and Dermatology" | Barnet Kellman | Cindy Chupack | October 27, 2000 | 01001 |
| 5 | "Bachelors" | Barnet Kellman | Jay Scherick & David Ronn | November 3, 2000 | 01005 |
| 6 | "Love's Labor Lost" | Barnet Kellman | Marc Flanagan | November 10, 2000 | 01003 |
| 7 | "Three Guys, a Girl and a Conversation Nook" | John Fortenberry | Paul Ruehl | December 1, 2000 | 01008 |
| 8 | "The Kid's Alright" | James Widdoes | Richard Dresser & Tom Leopold | December 8, 2000 | 01009 |
| 9 | "Meet the Wolfes" | James Widdoes | Richard Dresser & Tom Leopold | December 15, 2000 | 01010 |
| 10 | "White Knight" | Andrew Tsao | Cindy Chupack | Unaired | 01006 |
| 11 | "The Strike" | Barnet Kellman | Alexa Junge | Unaired | 01007 |
| 12 | "The Grudge" | James Burrows | Teleplay by : Cindy Chupack; Story by : Gabriel Byrne | Unaired | 01011 |
