= Tron: Ares =

2025 film by Joachim Rønning

- Theatrical release poster
- Directed by: Joachim Rønning
- Screenplay by: Jesse Wigutow
- Story by: Jesse Wigutow; David DiGilio
- Based on: Characters by: Steven Lisberger; Bonnie MacBird
- Produced by: Sean Bailey; Jared Leto; Emma Ludbrook; Jeffrey Silver; Steven Lisberger; Justin Springer
- Starring: Jared Leto; Greta Lee; Evan Peters; Jodie Turner-Smith; Hasan Minhaj; Arturo Castro; Gillian Anderson; Jeff Bridges
- Cinematography: Jeff Cronenweth
- Edited by: Tyler Nelson
- Music by: Nine Inch Nails
- Production companies: Walt Disney Pictures; Sean Bailey Productions
- Distributed by: Walt Disney Studios; Motion Pictures
- Release dates: October 6, 2025 (El Capitan Theatre); October 10, 2025 (United States)
- Running time: 119 minutes
- Country: United States
- Language: English
- Budget: $180–220 million
- Box office: $142.2 million

Tron: Ares is a 2025 American science fiction action film. It is the third installment of the Tron series following Tron: Legacy (2010). Produced by Walt Disney Pictures, the film was directed by Joachim Rønning, and stars Jared Leto, Greta Lee, Evan Peters, Jodie Turner-Smith, Hasan Minhaj, Arturo Castro, and Gillian Anderson, with Jeff Bridges reprising his role as Kevin Flynn from the first two films. The story is about artificial intelligence originating from the Grid entering the real world, namely a highly advanced program called Ares.

Development of a sequel to Tron: Legacy began in October 2010 by franchise creator Steven Lisberger. In March 2017, Walt Disney Pictures shifted plans toward a reboot with Leto playing a new character. Garth Davis was set as director in August 2020 when Wigutow was working on the script, but stepped down in January 2023. Rønning replaced him a month later. Production was expected to begin in August 2023 but was delayed by the 2023 Writers Guild of America and SAG-AFTRA strikes. Filming ultimately began in January 2024 in Vancouver and finished in May. By August, industrial rock band Nine Inch Nails had been announced to be composing the score. The band's members, Trent Reznor and Atticus Ross, served as executive producers on the film, alongside Legacy director Joseph Kosinski.

Tron: Ares premiered in Los Angeles on October 6, 2025, before a general release followed on October 10, and received mixed reviews from critics. It was considered a box-office disappointment, grossing $142 million worldwide on a production budget of $180–220 million, although it found commercial success with its home media release.

== Plot ==
In 2025, ENCOM and Dillinger Systems are in a race to bring digital constructs into reality. ENCOM's CEO Eve Kim and her partner Seth Flores visit a remote station near Skagway, Alaska built decades earlier by Kevin Flynn. Finding Flynn's "permanence code", enabling constructs to exist for more than 29-minute intervals, they transfer a digital orange tree into the real world.

Julian Dillinger, the head of Dillinger Systems and grandson of former ENCOM executive Ed Dillinger, introduces his shareholders to Ares, a Master Control Program he describes as the "perfect, expendable soldier". Ares shows signs of self-awareness and notes Julian's indifference to his programs' survival, while Julian's mother, Elisabeth, expresses concern about their constructs' limited lifespans. Julian sends Ares and his unit to attack ENCOM's digital Grid, downloading Eve's personal data in pursuit of the permanence code. Against his programming, Ares tries to save an injured program, but Julian extracts him and disables ENCOM's Grid.

Redeployed to the outside world, Ares tracks Eve's jet as she and Seth return to ENCOM with the permanence code. Learning of Julian's cyberattack from their colleague Ajay Singh, Eve flees as Ares and his second-in-command Athena chase her through the city on Light Cycles. Eve hijacks Athena's Light Cycle but is cornered by Ares, and destroys the drive containing the code. Reaching the end of his 29-minute lifespan, Ares recognizes Eve's empathy towards his plight. As Ares and Athena are "derezzed", Julian digitizes Eve onto the Dillinger Grid.

Ares reveals the code can be obtained using Eve's identity disc, and Julian is willing to let her die as a result. Lying to Athena that Julian is "indisposed", Ares bargains with Eve, asking to achieve permanence in exchange for her freedom. Suspicious, Athena contacts Julian and, deciding that Ares is malfunctioning, returns with orders to de-rez him. Evading their pursuers, Ares and Eve return to the real world. En route to ENCOM, they reflect on their motivations, as Ares shows further signs of self-awareness and individuality.

Eve realizes a copy of the code might be stored in Kevin Flynn's original office, preserved at ENCOM Tower, where they reunite with Seth to upload Ares onto Flynn's original Grid using a particle laser. (Note: As depicted in Tron (1982)) They are ambushed by Athena, who destroys the laser to trap Ares, but experiences a moment of self-awareness before de-materializing. Ajay and his assistant Erin arrive, joining Seth and Eve in using Athena's own laser to hack the Dillinger Grid.

Elisabeth retakes the position of CEO and tries to turn off the particle lasers, but Athena re-materializes and fatally stabs her, to Julian's horror, having interpreted her as an obstacle to his directive to obtain the code "by any means". On Flynn's Grid, Ares encounters a manifestation of Flynn, and they discuss Ares's desire for permanence. Intrigued by Ares's wish to live and to save Eve, Flynn grants him the permanence code and re-materializes him via backdoor at Flynn's Arcade.

Athena pilots a Recognizer into the city, capturing Eve while the ENCOM staff breach the Dillinger Grid, but Ares intercepts Athena and her unit. Ajay, Seth, and Erin shut down the Dillinger mainframe, preventing Ares's fellow Dillinger programs from re-materializing, and a wounded Athena permanently de-materializes in Ares's arms. The police raid Dillinger headquarters, but Julian uses the laser to digitize himself. Eve and Ares go their separate ways, as ENCOM uses the permanence code to benefit the world.

Ares sends Eve a postcard, traveling the world in search of Flynn's son, Sam, and his companion, Quorra. Eve reconstructs the Skagway facility on top of ENCOM Tower, including the orange tree. Back in the damaged Dillinger Grid, Julian is transformed by an identity disc that belonged to his grandfather's program Sark.

== Cast ==
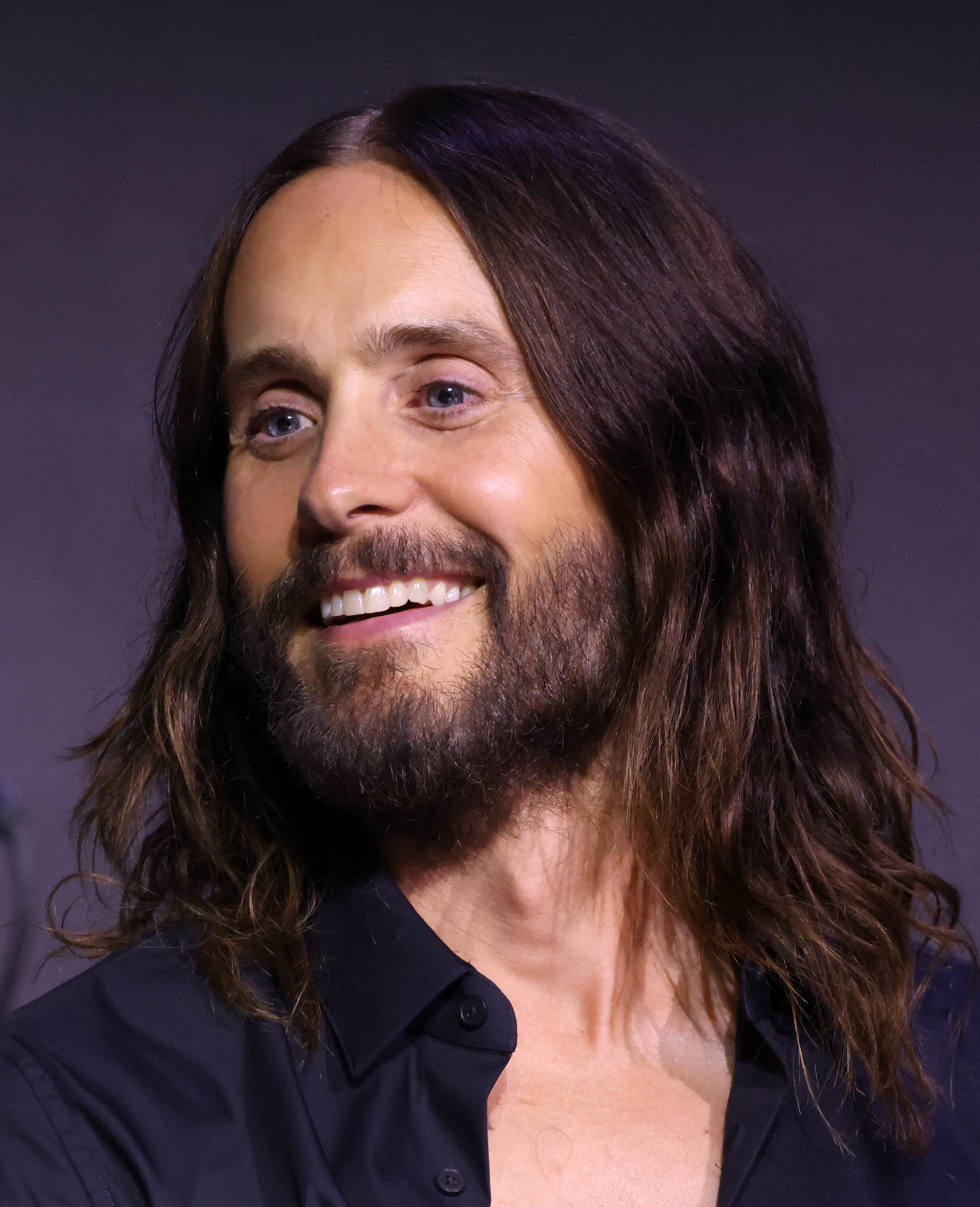
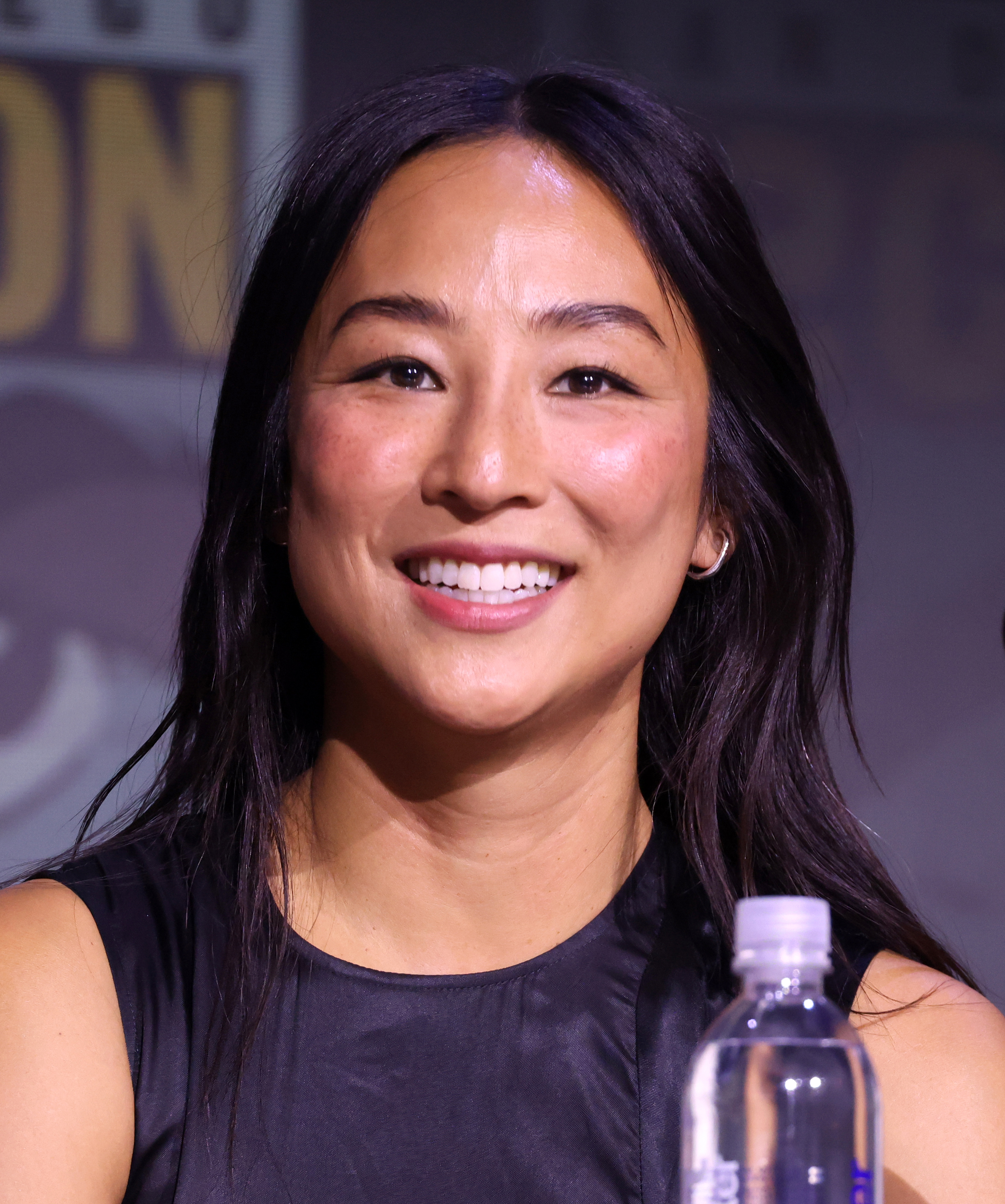
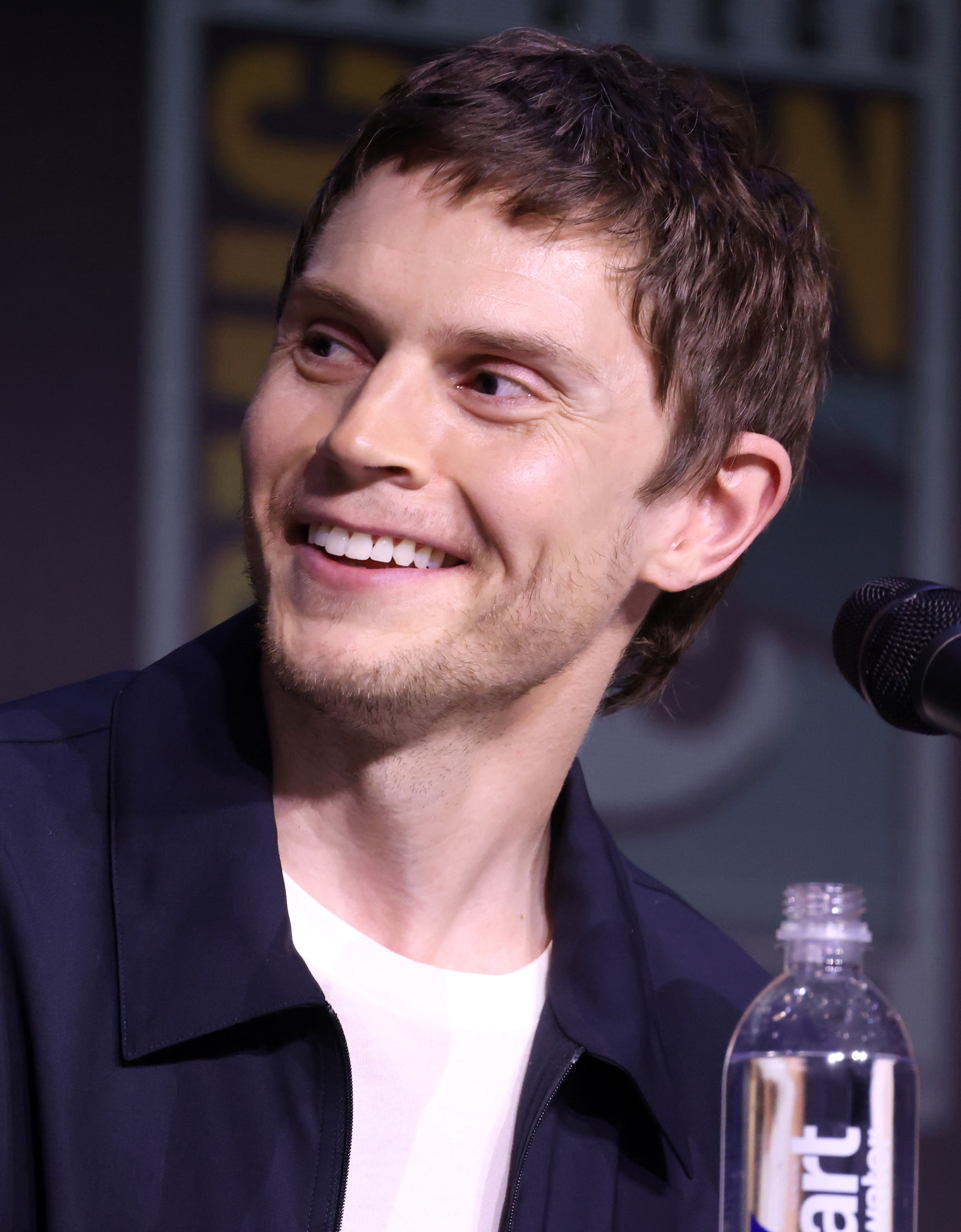
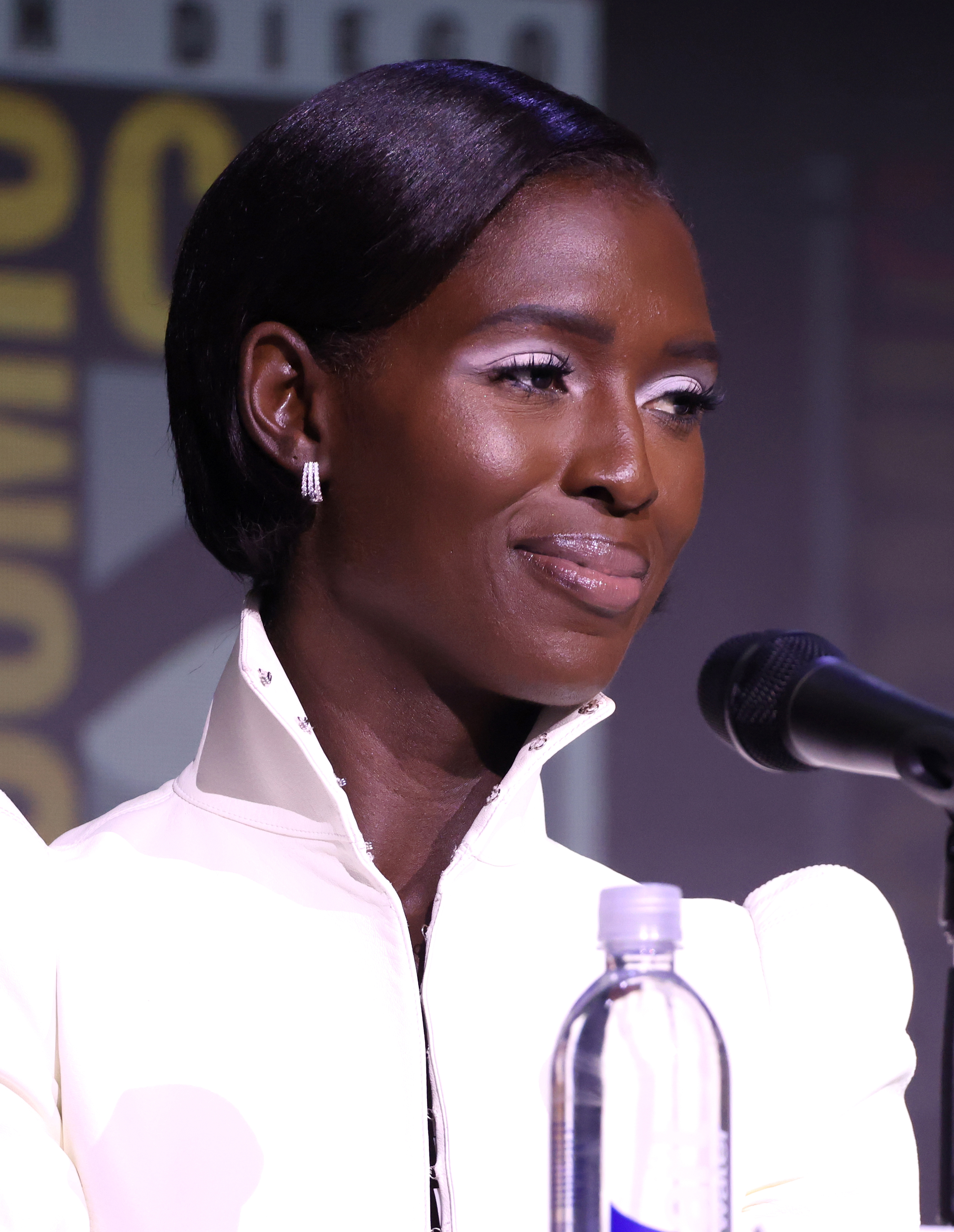
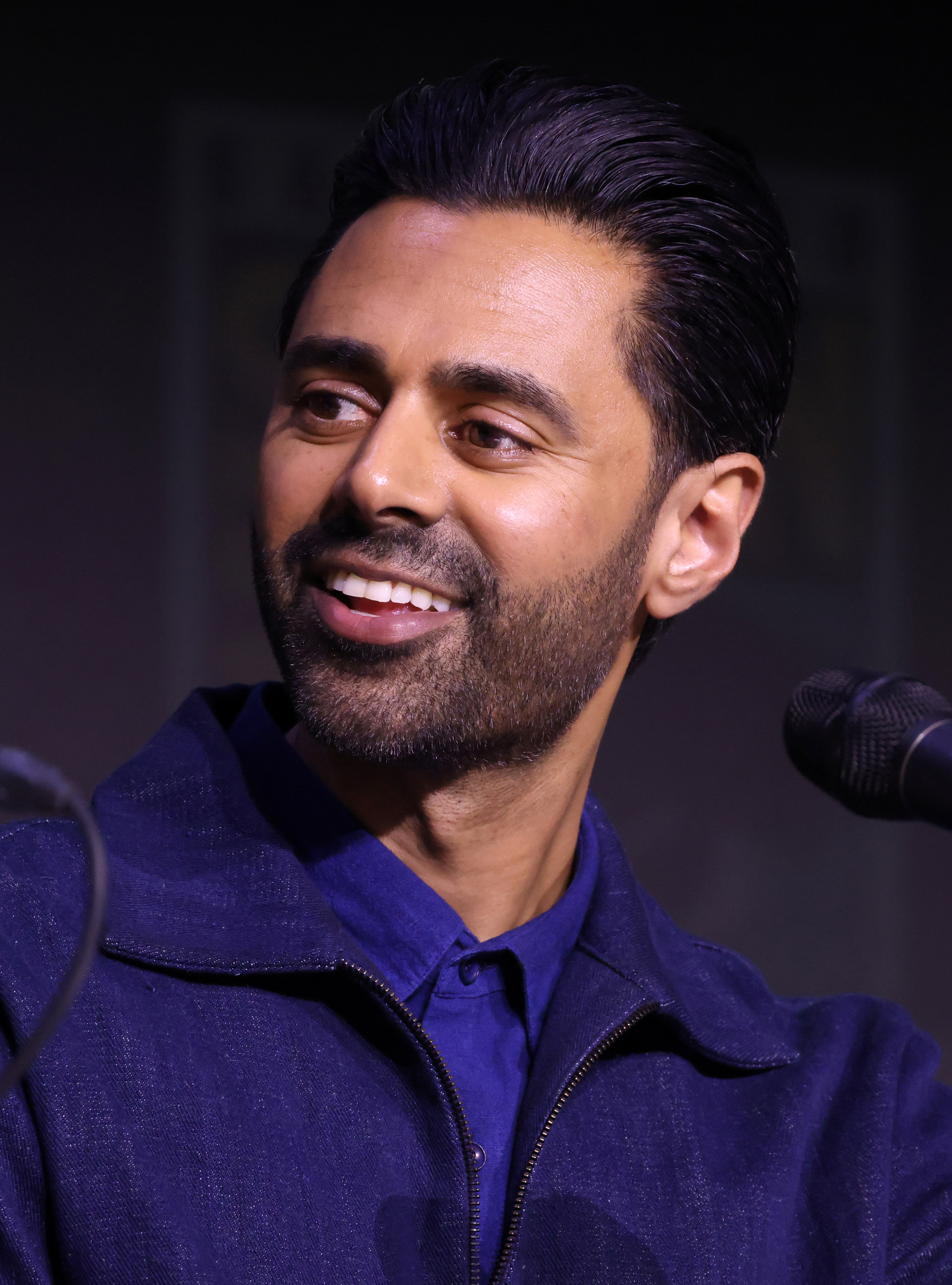
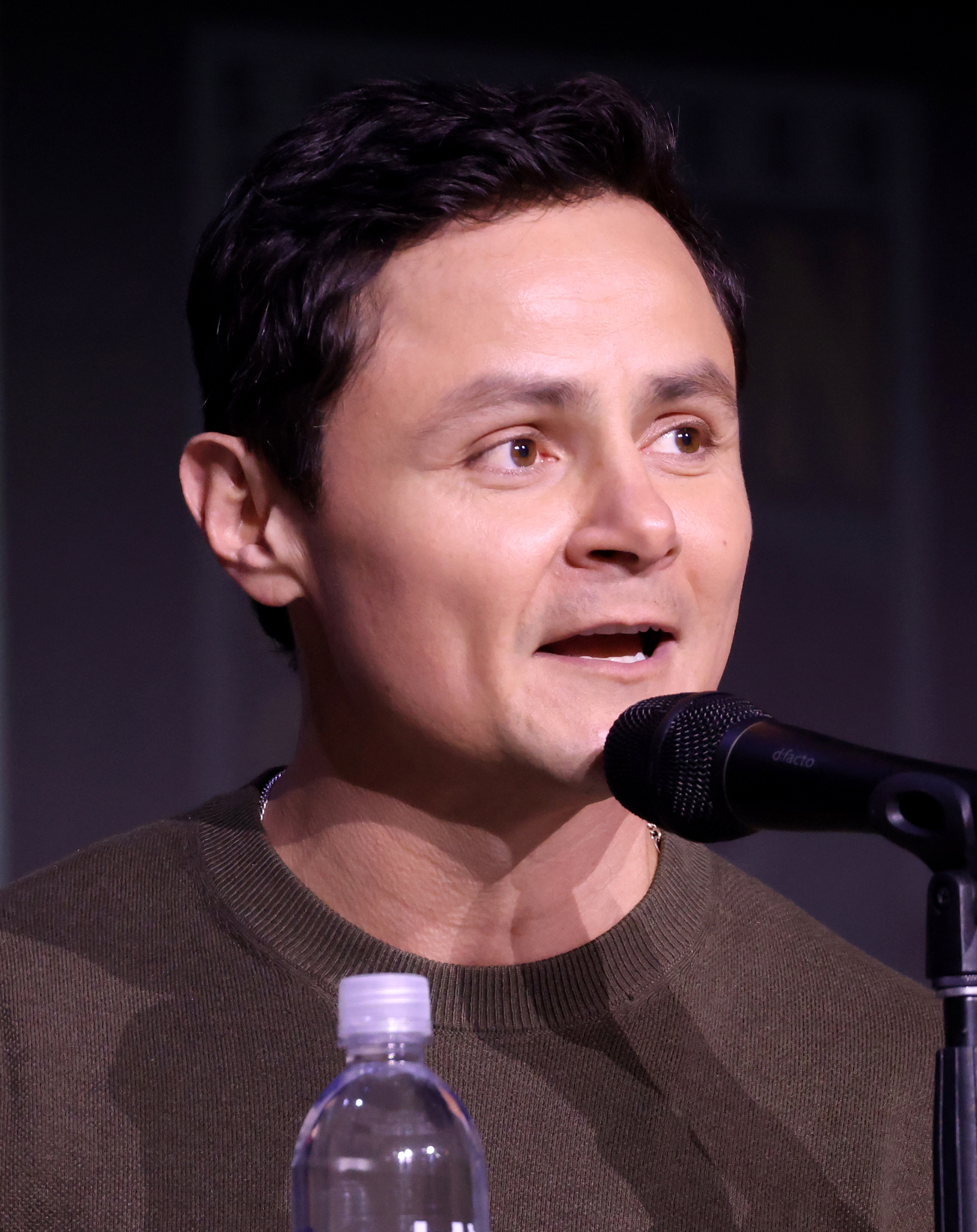
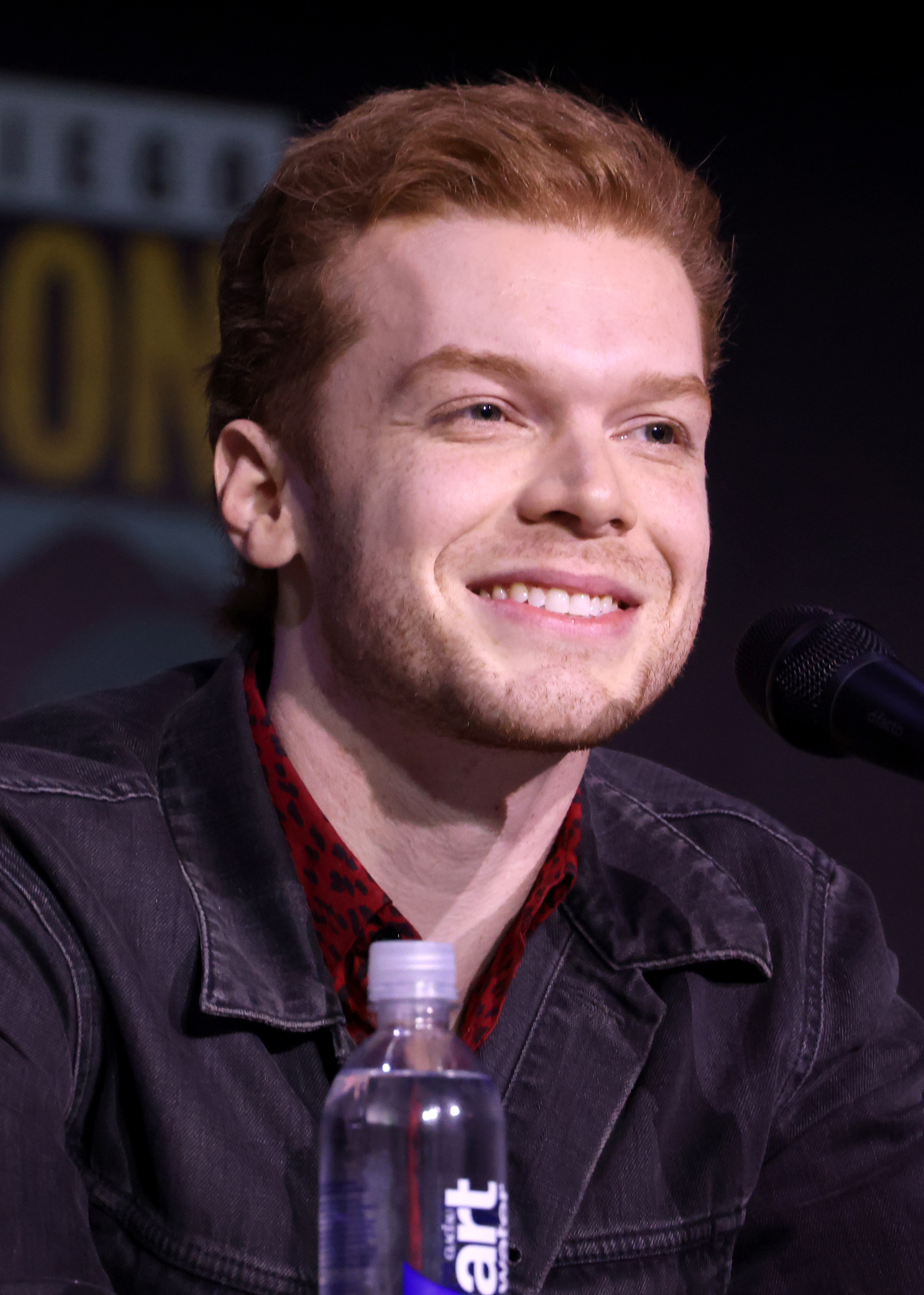
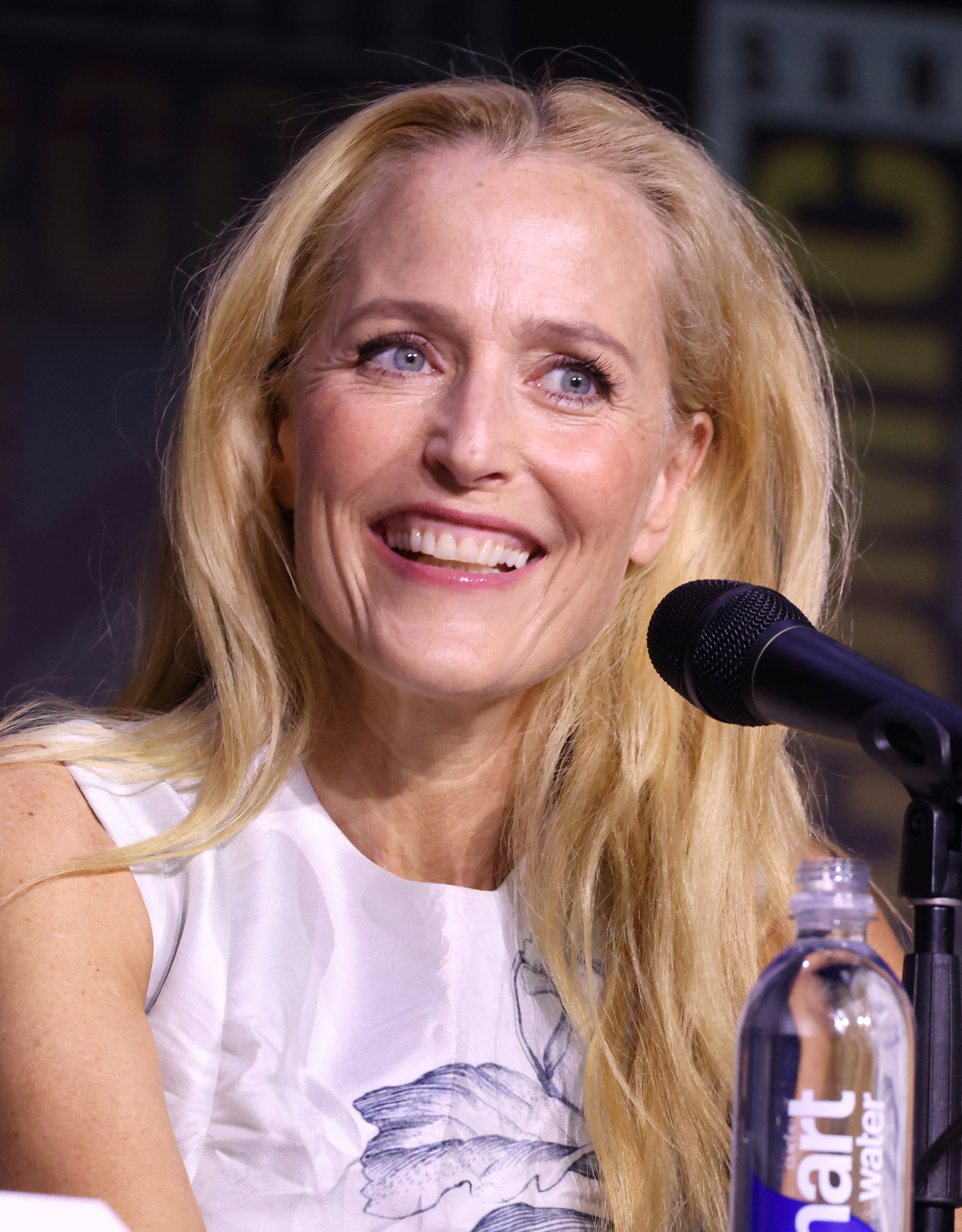
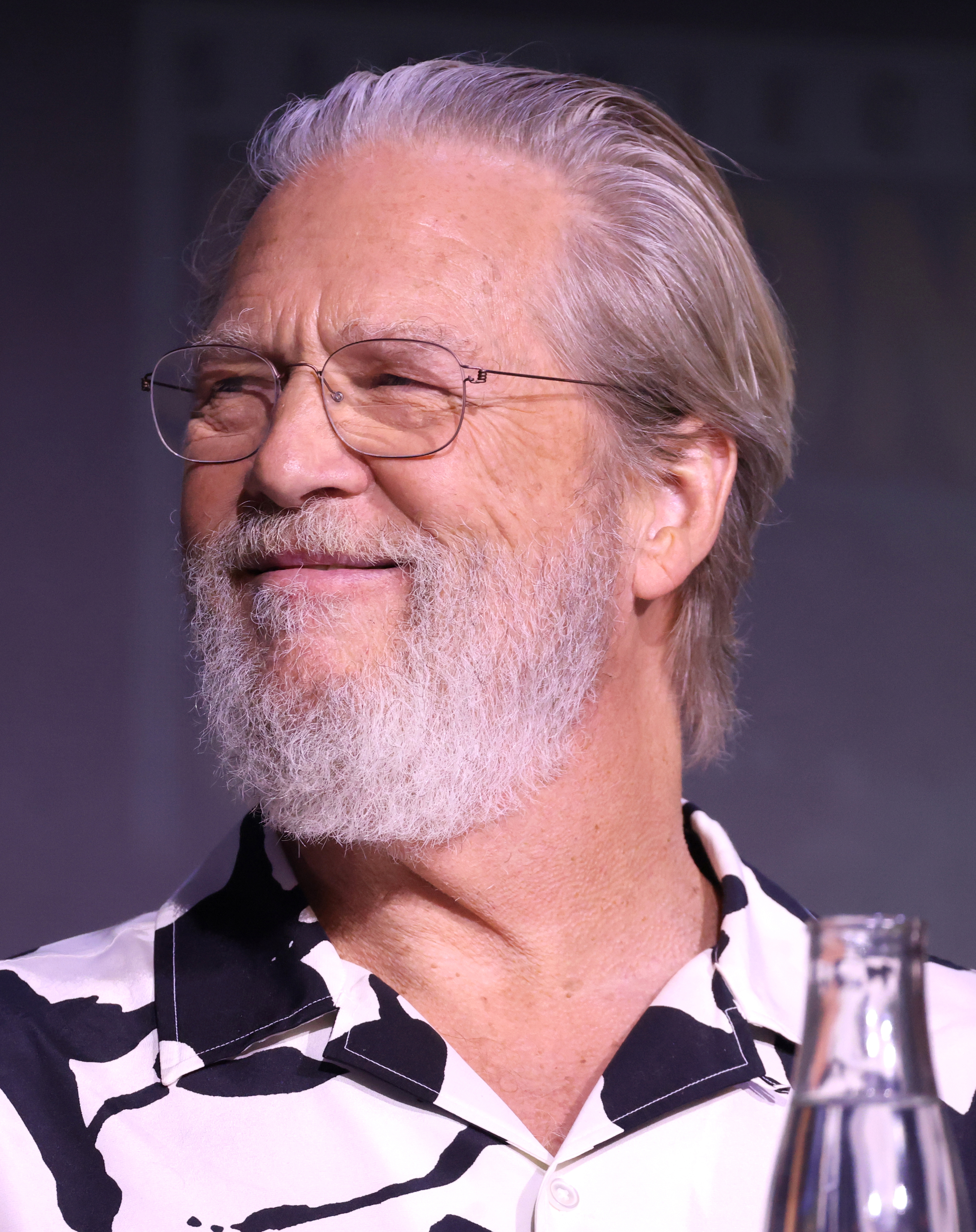
Main cast: Leto • Lee • Peters
Turner-Smith • Minhaj • Castro
Monaghan • Anderson • Bridges promoting the film at the 2025 San Diego Comic-Con
- Jared Leto as Ares, a combat program created by Dillinger Systems
- Greta Lee as Eve Kim, the current CEO of ENCOM who is in search of Kevin Flynn's Permanence Code
  - Miru Kim as young Eve
- Evan Peters as Julian Dillinger, the CEO of Dillinger Systems and the grandson of the late Ed Dillinger
- Jodie Turner-Smith as Athena, a program creation of Dillinger Systems and second-in-command to Ares
- Hasan Minhaj as Ajay Singh, Eve's business partner and CTO of ENCOM
- Arturo Castro as Seth Flores, a colleague and friend of Eve
- Gillian Anderson as Elisabeth Dillinger, Julian's mother and the daughter of the late Ed Dillinger
- Jeff Bridges as Kevin Flynn, the former CEO of ENCOM and the father of Sam Flynn who is now a digital construct within his original grid
- Cameron Monaghan as Caius, a combat program and member of Ares' elite special forces unit
- Sarah Desjardins as Erin, an ENCOM employee and Ajay's assistant
- Selene Yun as Tess Kim, Eve's deceased sister
  - Catherine Haena Kim as the voice of Tess Kim
  - Narsha Kim as young Tess
- Aaron Paul Stewart as Cyber Security Pete
- Roger Cross as Cross, a high-end executive at Dillinger Systems and Julian Dillinger's right-hand man
- Roark Critchlow as General McGrath, a member of the military that attended Julian Dillinger's pitch
- Katharine Isabelle as Marcia Lee Hadlow, an attendee of Julian Dillinger's pitch
- Gary Vaynerchuk as Stuart Roche, an attendee of Julian Dillinger's pitch
- Kwesi Ameyaw as Silvio

Nine Inch Nails members Trent Reznor and Atticus Ross make cameo appearances as two F-35 pilots. Shannon Leto, brother of Jared Leto and co-founder of Thirty Seconds to Mars, makes a brief appearance as a pizza parlor patron who witnesses the climax. Garrett Hedlund and Olivia Wilde appear in their Tron: Legacy (2010) roles as Sam Flynn and Quorra through archival photos, and archive audio of David Warner as the original Master Control Program from Tron (1982) is used. Reporters Robin Roberts, Kara Swisher, Curt Sandoval, Jaclyn Lee, Trevor Ault, and Zohreen Shah appear as themselves, as does computer scientist Fei-Fei Li.

== Production ==
=== Development ===
==== Original concept ====
Development of a sequel to Tron: Legacy was announced in October 2010 by franchise creator Steven Lisberger, with Legacy screenwriters Edward Kitsis and Adam Horowitz set to return. In April 2011, director Joseph Kosinski stated the script was still in development, and confirmed that the story would continue from Tron: Legacy. He stated that the relationship of the characters of Garrett Hedlund's Sam Flynn and Olivia Wilde's Quorra would be "the next step", with the plot following their adventures in the real world. On March 31, 2011, Kosinski said that the film's script was expected to be finished in two weeks and its working title was TR3N.

In June, it was reported that screenwriter David DiGilio was hired to write the screenplay, as Kitsis and Horowitz had dropped out to develop their television series Once Upon a Time. In March 2012, Bruce Boxleitner stated he believed filming could potentially begin as early as 2014, after Kosinski was available following his commitments to the film Oblivion. In June, Kitsis and Horowitz stated that they were still involved with the project, though by December, Jesse Wigutow had been hired to rewrite the script. That same month, Boxleitner and Hedlund were confirmed to be returning for the sequel.

In March 2015, it was revealed that Disney had officially greenlit the third film with Hedlund, Kosinski and Wilde set to return, and production due to begin in October in Vancouver. In May, it was announced that Disney had scrapped the film, Hedlund stated the reason for the cancellation was a result of the box office failure of Tomorrowland. In July, Boxleitner announced the cancellation of the film had ended his interest in returning to the franchise. In September, Hedlund stated he was told that the sequel was not "totally dead", and would be interested in returning should a new film be announced.

In August 2016, Brigham Taylor, then a development executive at Disney, revealed discussions were being had about Tron's future. In 2017, Kosinski stated that the sequel was in more of a "cryogenic freeze" as opposed to completely cancelled. He attributed Disney's then-recent acquisition of Lucasfilm and Marvel as reasons for Tron being put on the backburner. According to producer Justin Springer, the title for the abandoned sequel was Tron: Ascension.

==== Redevelopment as Ares ====
In March 2017, it was reported the franchise would be moving towards a reboot instead of a Legacy sequel, with Jared Leto attached to produce and portray a new character named Ares that was retained from prior iterations of the Ascension script. The seeds of the film was traced to a conversation between Springer and Lisberger during development of Legacy about how the latter came up with the original film, that being how there was an obsession with a first encounter with aliens in the late 1970s and early 1980s when he lived around the Massachusetts Institute of Technology (MIT), leading him to wonder what if intelligent life didn't come from outer space but from inside a machine created by people yet not controlled by them. The Ascension script was abandoned, but the filmmakers made a conscious decision to develop some of the Ares story from that version, particularly its core concept due to their idea that it remained relevant. They said that since the release of Legacy, the concept of Ares and its retention of older ideas had become more relevant with each year until its release instead of becoming more dated. In August 2020, Garth Davis was hired to direct the film, with Wigutow still attached to write the screenplay. Patrice Vermette at the time had been hired as production designer.

In March 2022, Leto confirmed that the film was still happening. By January 2023, Davis had exited as director, with Joachim Rønning entering negotiations to take the directing job. Vermette would also depart as production designer. In June, Evan Peters, Greta Lee, and Jodie Turner-Smith joined the cast, and Jack Thorne was revealed to have written a draft of the script. Cameron Monaghan and Sarah Desjardins would be added the following month. In January 2024, Gillian Anderson joined the cast in an undisclosed role. Legacy has teasers, but Rønning confirmed in September 2025 that Jeff Bridges would be the only returning actor from previous films, reprising his role as Kevin Flynn, and he affirmed that neither Hedlund as Sam Flynn or Cillian Murphy as Ed Dillinger Jr. would return from Legacy, both due to creative choices and a lack of interest from the actors' part. Springer also said that "throwing" cameo appearances in like a "parade of people" felt like fan service which would not serve the story, so they opted to only bring back characters in a way that reminded the audience of their love for the franchise, but by surprising them in a way that works. The film is not set to address the cliffhanger ending of Legacy or the fates of Sam and Quorra, but Springer affirmed that it does not contradict that ending and that Legacy remains canon.

The studio planned to add an AI-generated character that would have been a sidekick to Flynn, a soldier named Bit entering the real world, but the plan was abandoned before filming to avoid potential controversy in the midst of societal and governmental issues surrounding the regulation of AI in filmmaking. Bit is still present in the final film, portrayed identically to the original Tron, as an object able to speak only "yes" or "no", representing the maximum two states a binary bit of information can hold.

=== Filming ===
Principal photography was scheduled to begin in Vancouver on August 14, 2023, but was postponed indefinitely due to the 2023 Writers Guild of America and the 2023 SAG-AFTRA strikes. Following the conclusion of the strikes in early November 2023, filming was reportedly set to begin in early 2024. In November 2023, it was announced that production on the project would officially begin following the holiday season of the same year. In January 2024, Rønning revealed production had begun, under the working title Velcro. Jeff Cronenweth serves as cinematographer. A first look image was released by Disney in February, with Hasan Minhaj and Arturo Castro added to the cast. Production occurred on the Cambie Bridge overnight on March 15. In April, Jeff Bridges, who portrayed Kevin Flynn and Clu in the previous Tron films, confirmed his involvement in the film. Filming wrapped on May 1. Jesse Wigutow received sole credit for the film's screenplay, along with a story credit with David Digilio. Off-screen additional literary material credits were attributed to Jez Butterworth, Brian Duffield, Justin Haythe, Nicole Holofcener, Tom McCarthy, Megan McDonnell, Jack Thorne, Billy Ray, and Legacy screenwriters Horowitz and Kitsis.

=== Post-production ===
Tyler Nelson serves as the editor. The film's visual effects were provided by Industrial Light & Magic (ILM), Distillery VFX, Image Engine, Lola VFX, GMUNK, OPSIS and Imaginary Forces, with David Seager serving as the film's visual effects supervisor.

== Music ==
In 2020, shortly after completing work on the film Soul, Trent Reznor and Atticus Ross were approached by Tom MacDougall, president of Walt Disney Music, to work on Tron: Ares. In August 2024, it was announced Nine Inch Nails would score the film. The use of the band's name was at Disney's request; the last score released under the Nine Inch Nails moniker was the 1996 video game Quake. The duo had previously composed nineteen film, television, and game soundtracks, which were credited with their own names.

Reznor explained that taking the Nine Inch Nails name influenced their approach to scoring Tron: Ares, putting them in a "grittier" mindset and allowing them to "play by different rules", something Disney was pleased with. For Rønning, it was important to "contrast The Grid and the real world," and that Nine Inch Nails, an industrial rock band, "lend itself perfectly into a new, more industrial Tron." In August 2024, premiering at the D23 event in Anaheim, the special footage for Tron: Ares included a remix of the Nine Inch Nails song "Something I Can Never Have".

On July 17, 2025, a new single "As Alive as You Need Me to Be" was released, and the soundtrack album was released on September 19, 2025, by Interscope Records, Walt Disney Records, and The Null Corporation. The soundtrack was nominated for the 2025 Hollywood Music in Media Award for Best Original Score in a Sci-Fi/Fantasy Film.

Tron Ares: Divergence, an album containing remixes and previously unreleased tracks, was released on February 27, 2026, featuring contributions by numerous musicians.

=== Additional music ===
Alongside the Nine Inch Nails score, recordings by other artists are also featured in Tron: Ares:

- "Paranoid" by Black Sabbath
- "We'll Never Know" by Stick to Your Guns
- "If Our Love Is Dead" by Royel Otis
- "Just Can't Get Enough" by Depeche Mode (the song and the band are directly referenced in the film dialogue)
- "Summer Breeze" by Seals & Crofts
- "Theme from Tron" and "Tron Scherzo" by Wendy Carlos performed by the London Philharmonic Orchestra.

== Marketing ==
$102.5 million was spent advertising the film. Bridges, Leto, and the rest of the cast appeared at D23 2024 in Anaheim, where a first look was shown. The same footage was showcased in D23 Brazil 2024. Bridges and Leto also appeared at CinemaCon 2025 to debut new footage for the film, which was subsequently released online as a teaser trailer on April 5 of the same year, along with a teaser poster.

In June 2025, TheWrap reported that Disney would be presenting the film at San Diego Comic-Con's Hall H in July that same year. The official trailer was released on July 17, 2025, accompanied by the new Nine Inch Nails song "As Alive as You Need Me to Be".

In August 2025, it was announced that Marvel Comics would publish Tron: Ares themed variant covers across their October titles, depicting their superhero characters through the lens of the Tron universe. Later that same month, during the 2025 Destination D23 showcase, it was announced that a new overlay inspired by Tron: Ares (featuring red lighting and music by Nine Inch Nails) would be coming to Tron Lightcycle Power Run attraction for a limited time beginning on September 15, 2025, at the Walt Disney World Resort and September 16, 2025, at the Shanghai Disney Resort.

== Release ==
=== Theatrical ===
Tron: Ares was released theatrically on October 10, 2025, including in RealD 3D, 4DX, ScreenX, Dolby Cinema, and IMAX. Tron: Ares marks the first film in the Tron series to be given a PG-13 rating by the Motion Picture Association, after its predecessors were rated PG. (Note: Tron was released before the PG-13 rating adoption on July 1, 1984.)

=== Home media ===
Tron: Ares was released for digital purchase and rental on December 2, 2025, and for 4K Ultra HD Blu-ray, Blu-ray, and DVD on January 6, 2026. It was released on Disney+ on January 7, 2026 with the IMAX Enhanced version of the film.

In the United States, Tron: Ares topped Fandango at Home's weekly digital sales and rental chart for the week ending December 7, following its premium digital release on December 2. The film remained within the chart's top ten through the week ending January 4. On physical media, it was the best-selling film for the week ending January 10, according to Circana's VideoScan tracking service, which compiles DVD and Blu-ray sales.

Streaming analytics firm FlixPatrol, which tracks daily video-on-demand charts and streaming rankings worldwide, announced that Tron: Ares ranked first or second in nearly every country where Disney+ is available within two days of its debut on the platform. The film later reached the top position on Disney+'s global Top 10 list, outperforming titles including Avatar and Avatar: The Way of Water within a week of its streaming release. Nielsen Media Research, which records streaming viewership on certain U.S. television screens, reported that the film generated 258 million minutes of viewing time from January 5–11, ranking as the fourth most-streamed film during that period.

== Reception ==
=== Box office ===
Tron: Ares grossed $73.2 million in the United States and Canada and $69.1 million in other territories for a total of $142.2 million worldwide. The film was a box-office bomb, with Deadline Hollywood reporting a total cost of $347.5 million, including production and advertising, and estimating that it ultimately would lose the studio over $132 million with an estimated box office total gross of $160 million—a figure it ultimately fell short of.

In its worldwide opening weekend, Tron: Ares was projected to gross $45–50 million in the United States and Canada and an additional $40–45 million overseas for a total of $85–95 million. The film made $4.8 million from advanced screenings and Thursday night previews. Following its domestic opening day of $14.3 million (including previews), weekend estimates were lowered to $35 million. It debuted to $33.5 million in the U.S. and Canada, leading the domestic box office but falling short of Legacy's $44 million opening (unadjusted for inflation), and grossed $60 million worldwide. In its second weekend, the film dropped 65%, grossing $11 million, finishing second behind newcomer Black Phone 2.

=== Critical response ===
On the review aggregator website Rotten Tomatoes, 52% of 271 critics' reviews are positive, with an average rating of 5.5/10. The website's consensus reads: "A sensory feast of vivid neon hues and a hypnotic soundtrack, Tron: Ares is gorgeous to behold but too narratively programmatic to achieve an authentically human dimension." Metacritic, which uses a weighted average, assigned the film a score of 48 out of 100, based on 49 critics, indicating "mixed or average" reviews. Audiences polled by CinemaScore gave the film an average grade of B+ on an A+ to F scale, the same grade as its predecessors, and the PostTrak definite recommend score was 57%.

David Rooney, writing for The Hollywood Reporter, praised Jared Leto's "refreshingly subdued performance" as the eponymous digital program, highlighting how this restrained approach added both an "emotional hook" and an "occasional touch of humor", and commended the film's design for honoring the franchise's roots while taking "significant steps forward". Tara Brady of The Irish Times echoed this sentiment, writing that Ares was better than its predecessor, citing the soundtrack and performances (particularly Leto and Lee), but noting that it "could pass for a visual album". In a four-out-of-four-star review, Matt Zoller Seitz of RogerEbert.com called it "spectacularly designed, swiftly paced, thoughtfully written, and directed within an inch of its neon-hued life". Wendy Ide of The Observer explained that "Tron: Ares posits the terrifying possibility that AI may not destroy the human race but could just be really sanctimonious and annoying, with its perfect skin tone and chiselled bone structure and prolonged, meaningful eye contact". Katie Walsh of Chicago Tribune wrote, "Rønning, who helmed a later Pirates of the Caribbean film and Young Woman and the Sea, provides serviceable direction of the material without offering much innovation. The film loses fidelity toward the end, as it becomes a crashy, pixelated monster movie, as the real world has no capability for hosting the sleek, bloodless appeal of the grid".

John Nugent of Empire magazine gave the film three stars out of five, writing that "You'll coo... in the manner of a toddler having some keys jangled at them", and calling it "fun if forgettable futuristic fluff." David Ehrlich of IndieWire graded the film C+, praising the score by Nine Inch Nails as playing a "pivotal role in giving this sequel its own sense of violent self-identity". Kyle Smith of The Wall Street Journal stated that "Tron: Ares is essentially a laser-light-show redo of the first two Terminator movies, with Eve as Sarah Connor, minus the suspense, the scares and the witty dialogue". Peter Bradshaw of The Guardian gave the film one star out of five, calling it "mind-bendingly dull". Robbie Collin of The Telegraph and Clarisse Loughrey of The Independent also awarded the film one star.

In an October 2025 interview with Entertainment Weekly, Bridges reflected on the film's performance and expressed hope that it would receive a cult following over time.

=== Accolades ===
Award	Date of ceremony	Category	Recipient(s)	Result	Ref.
AACTA Awards	February 4, 2026	Best Visual Effects or Animation	Jeff Capogreco, Alex Popescu, Jhon Alvarado, Tomasz Wachnik, Kacy McDonald	Won	
Austin Film Critics Association	December 18, 2025	Best Original Score	Nine Inch Nails	Nominated	
Costume Designers Guild Awards	February 12, 2026	Excellence in Sci-Fi/Fantasy Film	Christine Bieselin Clark and Alix Friedberg	Nominated	
Directors Guild of Canada Awards	November 8, 2025	Outstanding Technical Achievement		Nominated	
Golden Raspberry Awards	March 14, 2026	Worst Actor	Jared Leto	Nominated	
Grammy Awards	February 1, 2026	Best Rock Song	Nine Inch Nails for "As Alive as You Need Me to Be”	Won	
Grammy Awards	February 1, 2026	Best Song Written for Visual Media	Nine Inch Nails for "As Alive as You Need Me to Be”	Nominated	
Hollywood Music in Media Awards	November 19, 2025	Original Score – Sci-Fi/Fantasy Film	Nine Inch Nails	Nominated	
Kansas City Film Critics Circle	December 21, 2025	Best Original Score	Nine Inch Nails	Nominated	
Las Vegas Film Critics Society	December 19, 2025	Best Original Score	Nine Inch Nails	Nominated	
Satellite Awards	March 10, 2026	Best Makeup & Hair	Donald Mowat	Won	
Saturn Awards	March 8, 2026	Best Science Fiction Film	Tron: Ares	Nominated	
Saturn Awards	March 8, 2026	Best Film Music	Trent Reznor and Atticus Ross	Won	
Saturn Awards	March 8, 2026	Best Film Make Up	Zabrina Matiru and Donald Mowat	Nominated	
Seattle Film Critics Society	December 15, 2025	Best Original Score	Nine Inch Nails	Nominated	
St. Louis Film Critics Association	December 14, 2025	Best Visual Effects	Jeff Capogreco, Alex Popescu, Jhon Alvarado, Tomasz Wachnik, Kacy McDonald	Nominated	
Visual Effects Society Awards	February 25, 2026	Outstanding Environment in a Photoreal Feature	Jared Michael, Noor Valibhoy, Cody Gramstad, Stefan Litterini (For "Dillinger's Grid City")	Nominated	
Visual Effects Society Awards	February 25, 2026	Outstanding CG Cinematography	Jhon Alvarado, Michael Beaulieu, Jayden Beveridge, Hayley Kim	Nominated	

== Future ==
In an interview with Empire, Joseph Kosinski stated that he did not consider Ares as a direct sequel to Legacy, but rather a parallel story which leaves the door open for a potential sequel.
