= The Distinguished Gentleman =

1992 film by Jonathan Lynn

- Theatrical release poster by Steven Chorney
- Directed by: Jonathan Lynn
- Written by: Marty Kaplan; Jonathan Reynolds
- Produced by: Marty Kaplan; Leonard Goldberg; Michael Peyser
- Starring: Eddie Murphy; Lane Smith; Sheryl Lee Ralph; Joe Don Baker; Victoria Rowell; Grant Shaud; Kevin McCarthy; Charles Dutton
- Cinematography: Gabriel Beristain
- Edited by: Barry B. Leirer; Tony Lombardo
- Music by: Randy Edelman
- Production companies: Hollywood Pictures; Touchwood Pacific Partners
- Distributed by: Buena Vista Pictures Distribution
- Release date: December 4, 1992
- Running time: 112 minutes
- Country: United States
- Language: English
- Budget: $50 million
- Box office: $86 million

The Distinguished Gentleman is a 1992 American political comedy film starring Eddie Murphy. The film was directed by Jonathan Lynn. In addition to Murphy, the film stars Lane Smith, Sheryl Lee Ralph, Joe Don Baker, Victoria Rowell, Grant Shaud, Kevin McCarthy, and Charles S. Dutton.

The film's plot is centered on politics, specifically what members of Congress and lobbyists do to get what they want in Washington, D.C.

== Plot ==
Florida con man Thomas Jefferson Johnson crosses paths with Congressman Jefferson Davis "Jeff" Johnson at a party and becomes intrigued after overhearing just how wealthy members of Congress can become through corruption. After Congressman Johnson dies of a heart attack while having adulterous sex with a young staffer, con man Johnson decides to run for Congress in the election to replace him to take advantage of money from lobbyists. Omitting his first name, and abbreviating his middle name, he calls himself "Jeff" Johnson. He then manages to get on the ballot by pitching a seniors organization, the Silver Foxes, to endorse him.

Once on the election ballot, he uses the dead Congressman's old campaign material and runs a low budget campaign that appeals to name recognition, figuring most people do not pay much attention and simply vote for the "name you know." He wins a slim victory and is off to Washington, a place where the "streets are lined with gold."

Initially, the lucrative donations and campaign contributions roll in, but as he learns the nature of the con game in Washington D.C., he starts to see how the greed and corruption makes it difficult to address issues such as campaign finance reform, environmental protection, and the possibility that electromagnetic fields from overhead power lines may be giving kids in a small town cancer, which the electric power company is concealing. Johnson finds out it is true when he meets one of them.

In trying to address these issues, Congressman Johnson finds himself double-crossed by the powerful chairman of the Committee on Power and Industry, Rep. Dick Dodge. Johnson decides to fight back the only way he knows how: with a con. Johnson succeeds and exposes Dodge as corrupt. As the film ends, it appears likely that Johnson will be thrown out of Congress on account of his previously unknown criminal record, but he defiantly declares, "I'm gonna run for President!" then breaking the fourth wall.

== Cast ==
- Eddie Murphy as Thomas Jefferson Johnson
- Lane Smith as Dick Dodge
- Sheryl Lee Ralph as Loretta Hicks
- Joe Don Baker as Olaf Andersen
- Victoria Rowell as Celia Kirby
- Grant Shaud as Arthur Reinhardt
- Kevin McCarthy as Terry Corrigan
- Charles S. Dutton as Elijah Hawkins
- James Garner as Jefferson "Jeff" Davis Johnson
- Victor Rivers as Armando
- Chi as Homer Norton
- Sonny Jim Gaines as Van Dyke
- Noble Willingham as Zeke Bridges
- Gary Frank as Mike Strangland
- Daniel Benzali as Barclay "Skeeter" Warburton
- Cynthia Harris as Vera Johnson
- Susan Forristal as Ellen Juba
- Autumn Winters as Mickey Juba
- Doris Grau as Hattie Rifkin
- Frances Foster as Grandma Johnson
- Sarah Carson as Kimberly Meadows
- Brad Koepenick as Rafe Simon
- Mel Owens as Bo Chandler
- Nina Totenberg as Election Anchor
- Julianna McCarthy as Blue Haired Lady
- Daniel Petrie Jr. as Asbestos Lobbyist
- Della Reese as Elevator Operator

== Production ==
Eddie Murphy appeared in this Disney-produced film after a string of Paramount Pictures star vehicles. He was loaned out by Disney from his then-exclusive contract with Paramount Pictures. Bernard Weinraub, film reviewer for The New York Times, offered his opinion that Murphy wished to "move beyond the tepid material" he had been given by Paramount. Writer and producer Marty Kaplan said of Murphy's involvement "I feel like I've come close to winning the jackpot".

The film was shot at various locations in Washington, D.C.; Los Angeles; Harrisburg, Pennsylvania; Maryland, and Pasadena, California.

Director Jonathan Lynn later said: "It was the unlikely combination of Eddie Murphy and politics that drew me to it. The script was by a Washington insider, Marty Kaplan, who had been Vice President Mondale's speech writer. I loved working with Eddie, whom I had admired since 48 Hours and Trading Places. He was a superbly inventive comedy actor, and a delight to work with."

== Reception ==
=== Box office ===
The Distinguished Gentleman was released in December 1992 and went on to gross approximately $47 million in the United States and Canada. Internationally, the film grossed $39 million for a worldwide total of $86 million.

In an interview in 1996, Eddie Murphy said that the movie did not work like his previous movies because "it appeals to a different audience".

=== Critical response ===
Critical reaction to the movie was mixed-to-negative. On review aggregation website Rotten Tomatoes, the film holds an approval rating of 12%, based on 17 reviews. Metacritic, which uses a weighted average, assigned the film a score of 45 out of 100, based on 21 critics, indicating "mixed or average" reviews.

Roger Ebert of the Chicago Sun-Times liked the premise and what it had going for it, but criticized it for its "slow pacing", despite its being a screwball comedy. Owen Gleiberman of Entertainment Weekly called it "a sterile, joyless comedy, photographed in ugly, made-for-video close-up and featuring a farce plot so laborious it suggests John Landis on a bad day".

The movie won the feature film Environmental Media Award in 1993, and in 2001 the Political Film Society gave the film its special award of the year.

=== Legacy ===
In November 2023, the film's co-writer Marty Kaplan argued in a Politico article that life imitated art, drawing parallels between the film's plot and the election of George Santos to Congress.
