= Men Seeking Women =

- Directed by: Jim Milio
- Written by: Jim Milio
- Produced by: Mark Hufnail; Jim Milio; Melissa Jo Peltier; Alain Silver
- Starring: Grant Shaud; Maureen Teefy; Anthony Palermo; Will Ferrell; Lisa Wilcox; Nia Vardalos
- Music by: Edgar Struble
- Release date: March 8, 1997
- Running time: 92 minutes
- Country: United States
- Language: English

Men Seeking Women is a 1997 American comedy film written and directed by Jim Milio. The film stars Grant Shaud, Maureen Teefy, Anthony Palermo, Will Ferrell, Lisa Wilcox, and Nia Vardalos. The plot focuses on three friends, single on their birthdays, who each bet $2,000 to see who can get a girlfriend and make the relationship last for three months. The film was produced by Affinity Entertainment and MPH Entertainment Productions and distributed by Boulevard Entertainment and IFM Film Associates. The film was released direct-to-video on March 8, 1997 to mixed reviews.

== Plot ==
A group of men, all single on their birthdays, bet $2,000 each to see who can find a girlfriend and make the relationship last for three months. In a desperate attempt to find love, Nick begins a relationship with a much older woman and Les begins an affair with a married woman.

== Cast ==
- Grant Shaud as Les
- Maureen Teefy as Teri
- Anthony Palermo as Nick
- Will Ferrell as Al
- Lisa Wilcox as Judy
- Nia Vardalos as Iris

== Reception ==
The film has been met with mixed to positive reviews. Christopher Null of Contact Music gave the film a positive review stating, "For a direct-to-video movie, Men Seeking Women is far funnier than it has any right to be..." and "The key to Jim Milio's film is that he lets the three men's stories bouncing around enough to keep you from getting bored." Null also praised the performances of Ferrell and Shaud. In a more negative review, Bilge Ebiri of Rolling Stone criticized Ferrell's character stating, "Ferrell doesn't really get to use any of his talents. Better things were on the horizon. Much better." Nathan Rabin of The A.V. Club criticized the plot and the performances, saying:

"Ingeniously tapping into the well-documented male desire to speedily form life-long monogamous relationships, Men Seeking Women, if nothing else, proves that films about pathetic male lonely hearts can be just as inept and boring as films about pathetic female lonely hearts. Of course, it doesn't help that Men Seeking Women's three leads aren't the least bit sympathetic, or even particularly interesting."
