= Lisa Wilcox =

American actress

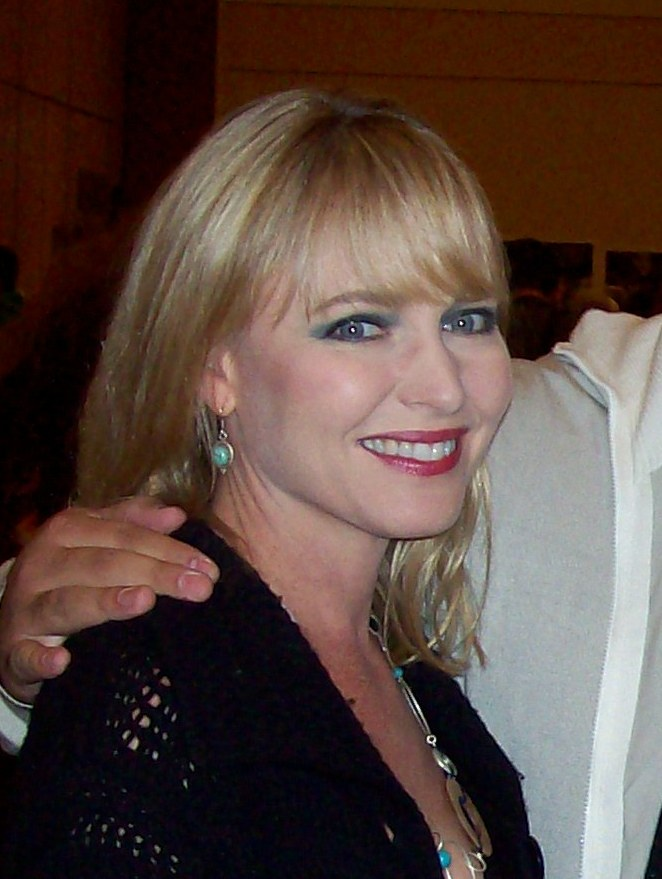
- Lisa Wilcox in October 2008
- Born: Lisa Elizabeth Wilcox; Columbia, Missouri, U.S.
- Occupations: Actress, designer
- Years active: 1984–present
- Known for: The Vengeance Factor; A Nightmare on Elm Street 4: The Dream Master; A Nightmare on Elm Street 5: The Dream Child
- Children: 2

Signature
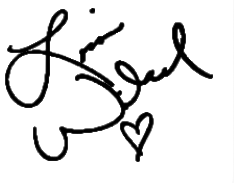

Lisa Elizabeth Wilcox is an American actress, and former model and designer. She is best known for her role as Alice Johnson in two critical and box office successful A Nightmare on Elm Street sequels; 1988's The Dream Master and 1989's The Dream Child.

== Career ==
In 1984, Wilcox made her film debut in Gimme an 'F'. From 1985 to 1987, Wilcox guest starred on the television series Hardcastle and McCormick (1985), You Again? (1986), CBS Schoolbreak Special (1987), Valerie's Family: The Hogans (1987), Mr. Belvedere (1987), and MacGyver (1987). In 1988, Wilcox guest starred on the television series It's a Living and Hotel before portraying Alice Johnson in the fantasy horror film [A Nightmare on Elm Street 4: The Dream Master.

At the wrap party, producers asked her if she would be willing to star in the fifth film, to which she agreed. Wilcox noticed a transformation of her character between the two films: "Alice started out very introverted, and even though she beat Freddy and became more confident, she still ended up pretty fearful. In this film, she’s still got that confidence but also a sense of outrage that makes her almost a madwoman. She’s stronger, more aggressive, and more willing to fight for her loved ones, more willing to put herself on the line." The film explores her character dealing with teen pregnancy, and while she noted early drafts of the script avoided the seriousness of the topic, subsequent rewrites incorporated dialogue pertaining to abortion and adoption. The same year, Wilcox portrayed Yuta in an episode of Star Trek: The Next Generation called "The Vengeance Factor".

In 1992, Wilcox was cast as Missy Preston in the short lived television series Bill & Ted's Excellent Adventures. From 1993 to 1995, Wilcox had guest roles on Boy Meets World. From 1997 to 1998, Wilcox had guest roles on Pacific Blue (1997), Walker, Texas Ranger (1998), and Chicago Hope (1998). The same year, Wilcox starred alongside Mark Hamill in Watchers Reborn. In 1997, Wilcox starred alongside Will Ferrell in the comedy film Men Seeking Women. In 2000, Wilcox portrayed Florence Henderson in Unauthorized Brady Bunch: The Final Days and Chastity Blade in the short film The All New Adventures of Chastity Blade.

In 2007, Wilcox appeared in 3 episodes of Big Shots. The following year, Wilcox was cast in Dead Country. In 2009, Wilcox portrayed Nurse Owens in the FEARnet produced webseries Fear Clinic for which she was nominated for the 2010 Streamy Awards. She starred alongside Robert Englund and Danielle Harris. In 2013, she starred in the thriller film Imago under the direction of Chris Warren, alongside actors such as Natalie Jones, Danielle Jones, Melanie Donihoo, Parrish Randall and Debbie Rochon. In 2015, Wilcox portrayed Pam Laudenslager in A Place Called Hollywood. In 2018, she portrayed Joan Laurels in the horror film The Church and is set to star in the sequel The Church: Second Offering.

Wilcox appeared on Ken Reid's TV Guidance Counselor podcast on July 20, 2016. Wilcox is set to star in the upcoming films: The Watcher of Park Ave, The Quite Room, The Possessed, and Kecksburg.

In 2023, Lisa appeared with her son on the reality series MILF Manor. In 2025, Lisa received the Hollywood Blood Horror Festival's Best Actress award for her performance in Blood On The Bleachers.

== Personal life ==
Wilcox has been married once, divorcing after almost ten years. She has two sons, Ryan and Alex. Ryan works as a software engineer.

== Filmography ==
Year	Title	Role	Notes
1984	Gimme an 'F'	Demons Dance Squad Member	
1987	General Hospital	Kay	Numerous episodes as charming GH worker by day and sexy cunning criminal by night.
1987	MacGyver	Janet	Episode: “Hell Week”
1988	A Nightmare on Elm Street 4: The Dream Master	Alice Johnson	Lead role
1988	Hotel	Donna Hayes	Episode: "Grand Designs"
1988	Bring Me the Head of Dobie Gillis	Bonnie Bascom	Television film
1989	A Nightmare on Elm Street 5: The Dream Child	Alice Johnson	Lead role
1989	Knots Landing	Ellen	4 episodes
1989	Star Trek: The Next Generation	Yuta	Episode: "The Vengeance Factor"
1992	Bill & Ted's Excellent Adventures	Missy Preston	7 episodes
1993-1995	Boy Meets World	Kris / TV Voice	3 episodes
1994	Murder, She Wrote	Lori Graham	Episode: "Murder on the Thirtieth Floor"
1997	Men Seeking Women	Judy	
1998	Watchers Reborn	Grace	
2000	The All New Adventures of Chastity Blade	Chastity Blade	Short film
2000	Unauthorized Brady Bunch: The Final Days	Florence Henderson / Carol Brady	Television film
2003	Freddy vs. Jason	Alice Johnson	Archive footage, special thanks
2007	Big Shots	Waxer	2 episodes
2008	Dead Country	Lisa	
2009	Fear Clinic	Nurse Owens	Web series, 5 episodes
2010	Never Sleep Again: The Elm Street Legacy	Herself	Documentary film
2011	The Intruders	Sofia Drake	
2011	Savage	Ellen Fremont	
2013	Imago	Christine	
2014	Clinger	Eugenia Klingher	
2015	Nightmares	Host	1 episode
2015	A Place Called Hollywood	Pam Laudenslager	
2018	Something Horrible	Alex Price	Voice
2018	The Executive Empress	Narrator	Documentary film
2018	The Church	Joan Laurels	
2018	William Froste	Nurse Boise	
2018	The Watcher of Park Ave	Gwen Hedren	Short film
2018	Red Hollow	Juliette	
2018	The Possessed	Savannah	
2018	The Quiet Room	Amy	Short film
2019	Scream, Queen: My Nightmare on Elm Street	Herself	Documentary film
2019	In Search of Darkness	Herself	Documentary film
2019	Kecksburg	Agent Pitcher	
2021	The Wet Ones	The Disco Master	
2023	MILF Manor	Herself	4 episodes
2025	Blood On The Bleachers	Mama	
