= Tyler Nelson (editor) =

Film and television editor

Tyler Nelson is an American film and television editor, who has edited the feature films The Batman (2022) and Creed III (2023) and the TV series Mindhunter (2017-2019). Nelson has worked for director David Fincher both as an assistant editor and as an editor.

For The Batman, Nelson and William Hoy were nominated for a Saturn Award for Best Editing.

== Credits ==
Nelson's editing credits
Year	Title	Medium	Credit	Ref.
2008	The Curious Case of Benjamin Button	Film	Assistant editor	
2010	The Social Network	Film	Assistant editor	
2011	The Girl with the Dragon Tattoo	Film	Assistant editor	
2013–2014	House of Cards	TV series	Assistant editor (21 episodes)	
2014	Gone Girl	Film	Assistant editor	
2017	Rememory	Film	Edited with Jane MacRae	
2017–2019	Mindhunter	TV series	Editor (8 episodes)	
2021	Shadow and Bone	TV series	Editor (2 episodes)	
2022	The Batman	Film	Edited with William Hoy	
2023	Creed III	Film	Edited with Jessica Baclesse	
2025	Tron: Ares	Film	Editor	
