= Maureen Teefy =

American actress

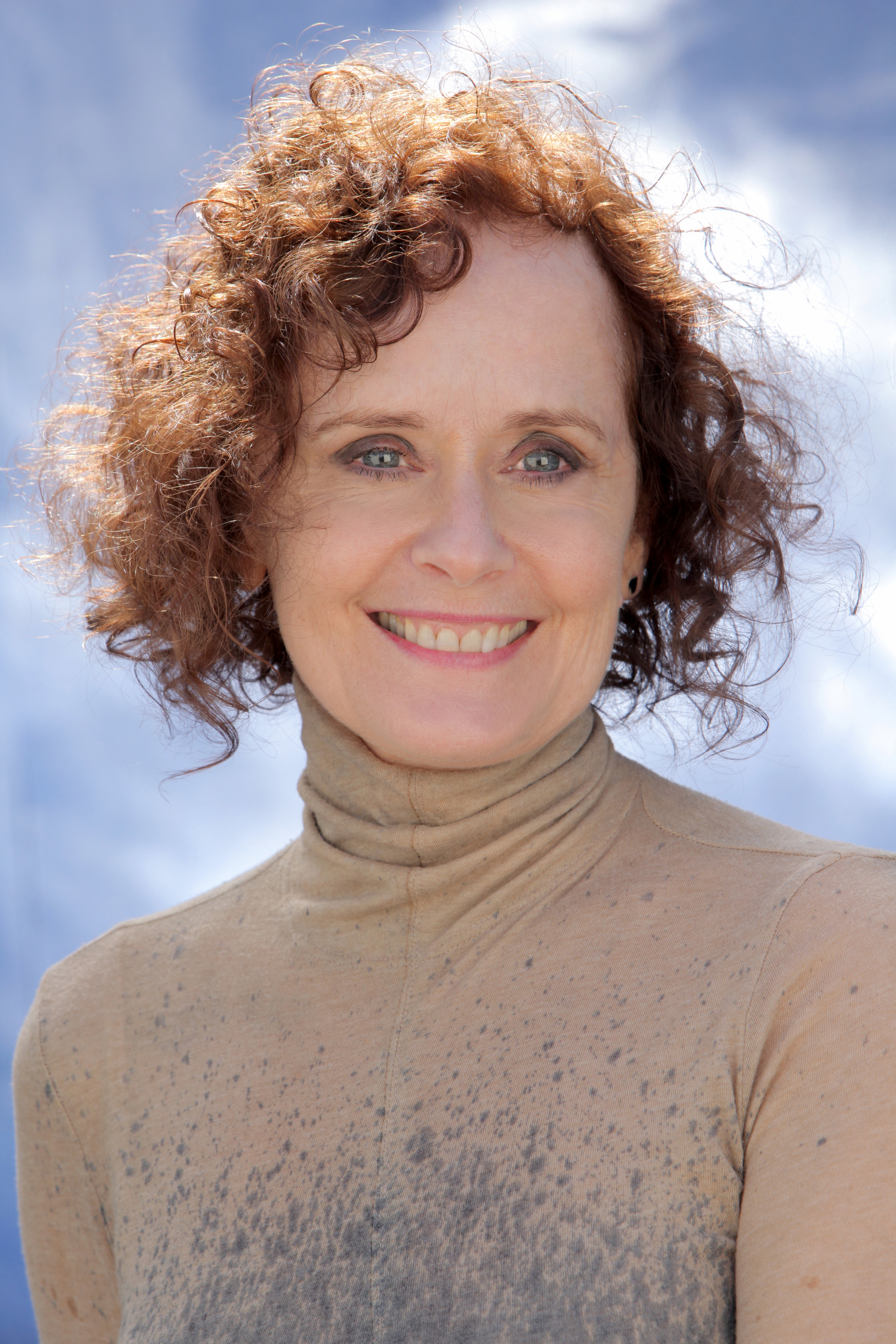
- Born: Minneapolis, Minnesota, U.S.
- Occupation: Actress
- Years active: 1979–1998, 2017
- Spouse: Alexander Cassini (m. 1982; div. 2006)
- Children: 1

Maureen Teefy is an American actress. She is best known for her appearances in the films Fame (1980), Grease 2 (1982), Supergirl (1984), and Star Time (1992). Her penultimate credit was in the 1997 film Men Seeking Women but reappeared 20 years later in 2017's Hollywood Girl: The Peg Entwistle Story.

== Life and career ==
Teefy was born October 26, 1953 in Minneapolis, Minnesota, one of eight sisters in a large Irish Catholic family.

Her first film role was a small part as a U.S.O. singer in the 1979 Steven Spielberg comedy 1941 and in the same year she appeared in two minor productions, Fyre and Scavenger Hunt. She was one of the principal performers in the 1980 Alan Parker musical drama Fame, portraying Doris, a naive young acting student. In 1981, she starred in the CBS Afternoon Playhouse episode "Portrait of a Teenage Shoplifter". Other films featuring Teefy include Grease 2 (1982) as Sharon Cooper, Supergirl (1984) as Lucy Lane, and Sunset (1988). She starred in the 1993 supernatural horror thriller Star Time, directed by Alexander Cassini (married 1982).

She provided the voice of the female robot "host" Chrome on the 1997 HBO horror series Perversions of Science. Other television roles include the made-for-TV films Legs and Disaster at Silo 7. She also guest-starred on TV series including Max Headroom and Mike Hammer, Private Eye. Her acting career developed much more in the theater, singing and dancing in several Broadway musicals.

Teefy wrote, produced and starred in A Subject for a Short Story.

== Filmography ==
Film
Year	Title	Role	Notes
1979	Fyre	Leeann	
1979	1941	USO Girl	
1979	Scavenger Hunt	Lisa	
1980	Fame	Doris Finsecker	
1982	Grease 2	Sharon Cooper	
1984	Supergirl	Lucy Lane	
1988	Sunset	Stagecoach Lady	
1992	Star Time	Wendy	
1997	Men Seeking Women	Teri	
2017	Hollywood Girl: The Peg Entwistle Story	Arkadina	
Television
Year	Title	Role	Notes
1979	ABC Afterschool Special	Natalia	Episode: "Dinky Hocker"
1981	CBS Afternoon Playhouse	Karen Hughes	Episode: "Portrait of a Teenage Shoplifter"
1983	Legs	Melissa Rizzo	TV movie
1987	Max Headroom	Shelley Keeler	Episode: "Academy"
1988	Disaster at Silo 7	Penny Travers	TV movie
1997	Perversions of Science	Chrome (voice role)	10 episodes
1998	Mike Hammer, Private Eye	Ali McClain	Episode: "The Long Road to Nowhere"

== Soundtrack ==
Soundtrack
Year	Title	Label	Songs performed
1982	Grease 2	RSO Records	"Score Tonight", "Who's That Guy?", "Girl for All Seasons", "We'll Be Together"
