= William Hoy (film editor) =

American film editor

- Born: Vancouver
- Occupation: Film editor
- Years active: 1988-present
- Known for: Dawn of the Planet of the Apes (2014); War for the Planet of the Apes (2017)
- Relatives: Maysie Hoy (sister)

William Hoy is an American film editor with 30 feature-film editing credits since 1988. Hoy and Stan Salfas won Satellite Awards for Best Editing for the films Dawn of the Planet of the Apes (2014) and War for the Planet of the Apes (2017). Hoy and Tyler Nelson were nominated the Saturn Award for Best Editing for The Batman (2022). Hoy is a member of American Cinema Editors (ACE).

Hoy has collaborated with director Zack Snyder on the films 300 (2006), Watchmen (2009), and Sucker Punch (2011). He has also collaborated with director Matt Reeves on the films Dawn of the Planet of the Apes, War for the Planet of the Apes, and The Batman.

Hoy has a sister, Maysie Hoy, who is also a film editor. They were born in Vancouver to Chinese parents. When his sister moved to Los Angeles for acting opportunities, he followed her and found an opportunity to contribute behind the scenes.

== List of editing credits ==
One of Hoy's first credits as editor was the film Silent Assassins (1988). Before then, his earliest credits were as assistant editor for the films Quintet (1979) and Health (1980).

Hoy's editing credits for film
Year	Title	Notes	Ref.
1988	Silent Assassins		
1989	Best of the Best		
1991	Star Trek VI: The Undiscovered Country	Edited with Ronald Roose	
1992	Patriot Games	Edited with Neil Travis	
1993	Sliver	Edited with Richard Francis-Bruce	
1994	Judicial Consent		
1995	Outbreak	Edited with Lynzee Klingman, Neil Travis, and Stephen E. Rivkin	
1997	The Eighteenth Angel		
1998	The Man in the Iron Mask		
1999	The Bone Collector		
2001	Madison		
2002	We Were Soldiers		
2003	A Man Apart	Edited with Bob Brown	
2004	I, Robot	Edited with Armen Minasian and Richard Learoyd	
2005	Fantastic Four		
2006	300		
2007	Fantastic Four: Rise of the Silver Surfer	Edited with Peter S. Elliot	
2009	Watchmen		
2011	Sucker Punch		
2012	Abraham Lincoln: Vampire Hunter		
2014	Dawn of the Planet of the Apes	Edited with Stan Salfas	
2015	Pan	Edited with Paul Tothill	
2017	2:22	Edited with Gary Woodyard and Sean Lahiff	
2017	War for the Planet of the Apes	Edited with Stan Salfas	
2019	The Last Summer	Edited with Melissa Remenarich-Aperlo	
2020	Underwater	Edited with Brian Berdan and Todd E. Miller	
2020	The Call of the Wild	Edited with David Heinz	
2022	The Batman	Edited with Tyler Nelson	
2023	Extraction 2	Edited with Álex Rodríguez	
2025	Superman	Edited with Craig Alpert	

== Accolades ==
Hoy's accolades
Year	Film	Editor(s)	Award	Ceremony	Result	Ref.
2014	Dawn of the Planet of the Apes	Hoy, Stan Salfas	Satellite Award for Best Editing	February 15, 2015	Won	
2017	War for the Planet of the Apes	Hoy, Stan Salfas	Satellite Award for Best Editing	February 11, 2018	Won	
2022	The Batman	Hoy, Tyler Nelson	Saturn Award for Best Editing	October 25, 2022	Nominated	
