= Disaster at Silo 7 =

- Genre: Drama; Science Fiction; Thriller
- Written by: Douglas Lloyd McIntosh
- Directed by: Larry Elikann
- Starring: Michael O'Keefe; Perry King; Peter Boyle; Patricia Charbonneau
- Music by: Mark Snow
- Country of origin: United States
- Original language: English

Production
- Executive producer: Mark Carliner
- Producer: Julian Krainin
- Cinematography: Roy H. Wagner
- Editor: Peter V. White
- Running time: 96 minutes
- Production company: Mark Carliner Productions

Original release
- Network: ABC
- Release: November 27, 1988

Disaster at Silo 7 is a 1988 American made-for-television thriller-drama film directed by Larry Elikann. It is loosely based on the 1980 Damascus Titan missile explosion.

== Plot ==
During routine maintenance of a liquid-fuelled ICBM, the fuel tank is penetrated by a falling socket. The film traces the efforts of the maintenance crew and associated military and civilian personnel to recover the potentially disastrous situation before the fuel tank is sufficiently depressurised that the stack collapses and explodes.

== Cast ==
- Michael O'Keefe as Sergeant Mike Fitzgerald
- Perry King as Major Hicks
- Patricia Charbonneau as Kathy Fitzgerald
- Peter Boyle as General Sanger
- Joe Spano as Sergeant Swofford
- Ray Baker as Colonel Chadwick
- Dennis Weaver as Sheriff Ben Harlen
- Joe Urla as Pepper Martinelli
- Brent Jennings as A.C. Jones
- Christian Clemenson as Colonel Brandon
- Ken Jenkins as Clarence
- Maureen Teefy as Penny Travers

== Influence ==
Inspired by the 1980 Damascus Titan missile explosion, Jeffrey K. Kennedy, one of the main protagonists of the Damascus event, was a special technical advisor for this movie.
