= Replikator =

- Directed by: G. Philip Jackson
- Written by: G. Philip Jackson; Michelle Bellerose; John Dawson; Tony Johnston
- Produced by: Daniel D'or; David F. McGuire; Howard E. Warren
- Starring: Michael St. Gerard; Brigitte Bako; La Cicciolina; Ned Beatty
- Cinematography: Jonathan Freeman
- Edited by: Bill Towgood; John Whitcher
- Music by: Donald Quan
- Production company: Producers Network Associates
- Distributed by: Prism Entertainment
- Release date: November 9, 1994
- Running time: 96 Minutes
- Country: Canada
- Language: English
- Budget: $1,250,000

Replikator is a 1994 science fiction film directed by G. Philip Jackson and starring Michael St. Gerard, Brigitte Bako, Ned Beatty and Ilona Staller.

== Cast ==
- Michael St. Gerard as Ludo Ludovic
- Brigitte Bako as Kathy Moscow
- Ned Beatty as Inspector Victor Valiant
- Ilona Staller as Miss Tina Show (as La Cicciolina)
- Lisa Howard as Lena
- Peter Outerbridge as John Cheever
- Ron Lea as Byron Scott
- David Hemblen as Police Chief
- Mackenzie Gray as Candor
- Frank Moore as Investigating Officer

== Production ==
Producer Daniel D'or, an aerial photography specialist, filmed the movie's two helicopter chase scenes personally. Replikator was the first feature film for cinematographer Jonathan Freeman and the first feature for production designer Taavo Soodor.

== Release ==
The film was mostly a direct to home-video release but had short theatrical runs in Japan, Canada, South Korea, South Africa, Malaysia and Indonesia. The film's success in many territories including the United States led to a business partnership between D'or and writer–director G. Philip Jackson.

== Reception ==
In 1995, the film took the Gold Award at the WorldFest-Houston International Film Festival in the category of Sci-Fi/Horror and took the Silver award for Science Fiction at the Charleston International Film Festival.
