= Heart of Dixie (film) =

1989 film by Martin Davidson

- Theatrical release poster
- Directed by: Martin Davidson
- Written by: Anne Rivers Siddons; Tom McCown
- Produced by: Steve Tisch
- Starring: Ally Sheedy; Virginia Madsen; Phoebe Cates; Don Michael Paul; Kurtwood Smith; Richard Bradford; Treat Williams
- Cinematography: Robert Elswit
- Edited by: Bonnie Koehler
- Music by: Phillip Namanworth; Kenny Vance
- Distributed by: Orion Pictures
- Release date: August 25, 1989 (United States)
- Running time: 95 minutes
- Country: United States
- Language: English
- Budget: $8 million
- Box office: $1,097,333

Heart of Dixie is a 1989 drama film adaptation of the 1976 novel Heartbreak Hotel by Anne Rivers Siddons and directed by Martin Davidson. The film stars Ally Sheedy, Virginia Madsen, Phoebe Cates and Treat Williams.

== Plot ==
Three sorority women at a 1957 Alabama college face the experience and difficulties of ethnic strife and integration.

== Cast ==
- Ally Sheedy as Maggie DeLoach
- Virginia Madsen as Delia June Curry
- Phoebe Cates as Aiken Reed
- Treat Williams as Hoyt Cunningham
- Don Michael Paul as Boots Claibourne
- Kyle Secor as Charles Payton "Tuck" Tucker
- Francesca P. Roberts as Keefi
- Peter Berg as Jenks
- Jenny Robertson as Sister
- Lisa Zane as M.A.
- Ashley Gardner as Jean
- Eddy Kiihnl as Mitchell
- Richard Bradford as Judge Claibourne
- Barbara Babcock as Coralee Claibourne
- Hazen Gifford as Dean Howard
- Michael St. Gerard as Elvis Presley

== Production ==
The expression "Heart of Dixie" is a nickname for the state of Alabama. The fictional Randolph University is based on Auburn University in Alabama.

The movie was filmed in Oxford, Mississippi at the University of Mississippi, and in Holly Springs, Mississippi. The soda shop featured in the film was a renovated gas station that became the original McAlister's Deli Restaurant.

== Reception ==
Noted film critic Vincent Canby of The New York Times wrote:

Heart of Dixie is a clear-eyed, funny and affecting movie about the emotional awakening of a pretty, white Alabama coed in 1957, on the eve of the great racial struggles that would mark the 1960s throughout the South. ... Mr. McCown's screenplay, based on the novel Heartbreak Hotel, by Anne Rivers Siddons, is refreshing in the way that it refuses to impose a long historical view on the immediate events it is recording. The movie is always aware of history, but it somehow avoids the awful self-assurance that comes with 20-20 hindsight. ... Miss Sheedy is so good as Maggie that the character's liberation, and the rise of her social consciousness, appear to be genuine triumphs. Miss Madsen, who looks a little like Carole Landis as well as like Kim Novak, is also fine, as are Mr. Williams, Phoebe Cates (as Maggie's unconventional friend) and Don Michael Paul, who manages to play Maggie's Southern chauvinist fiance with a good deal of arrogant charm.

In contrast, Rita Kempley, staff writer at The Washington Post panned the film, writing, "Ally Sheedy, Virginia Madsen and Phoebe Cates combine their negligible talents in Heart of Dixie -- a melodrama so full of hams, it oinks. Led by Sheedy, the tedious trio plays giddy coeds caught up in the racist and sexist traditions of the South in the late '50s. They all sound like they've been gulping hush puppy batter ... Working from McCown's histrionic screenplay, Martin Davidson of Eddie and the Cruisers proves once again that he don't know nothing 'bout directing no movies."

Ally Sheedy was nominated for the Golden Raspberry for Worst Actress but lost to Heather Locklear for The Return of Swamp Thing at the 10th Golden Raspberry Awards.
