= 7th Golden Raspberry Awards =

Award for worst cinematic under-achievements in 1986

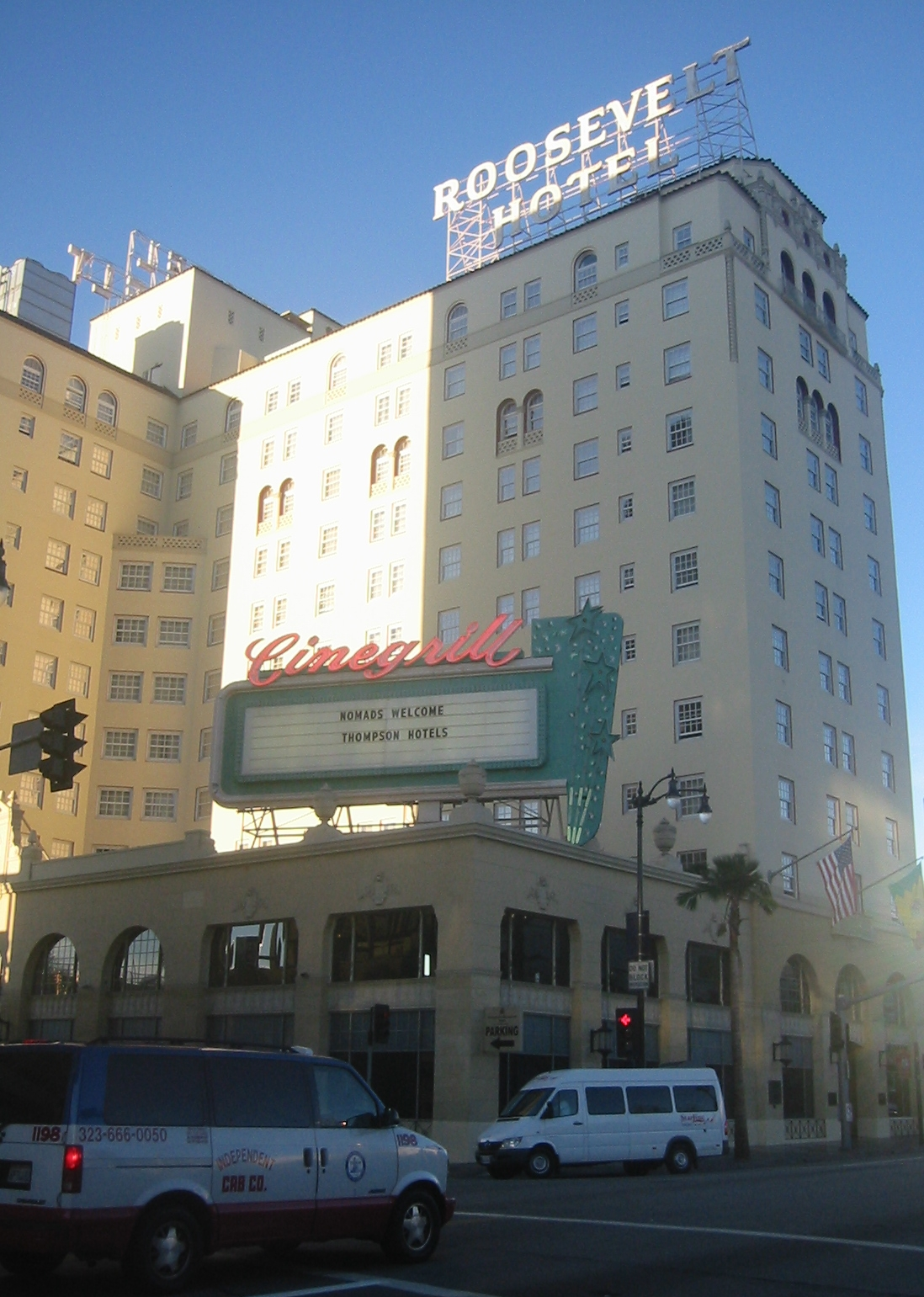
- The seventh Golden Raspberry Awards was held at the Hollywood Roosevelt Hotel
- Date: March 29, 1987
- Site: Hollywood Roosevelt Hotel, Hollywood, California

Highlights
- Worst Picture: Howard the Duck and Under the Cherry Moon
- Most awards: Under the Cherry Moon (5)
- Most nominations: Under the Cherry Moon (8)

The 7th Golden Raspberry Awards were held on March 29, 1987, at the Hollywood Roosevelt Hotel to recognize the worst the movie industry had to offer in 1986. For the first time, the Razzies had a tie for Worst Picture, between Howard the Duck and Under the Cherry Moon.

== Awards and nominations ==
Winner (in bold)
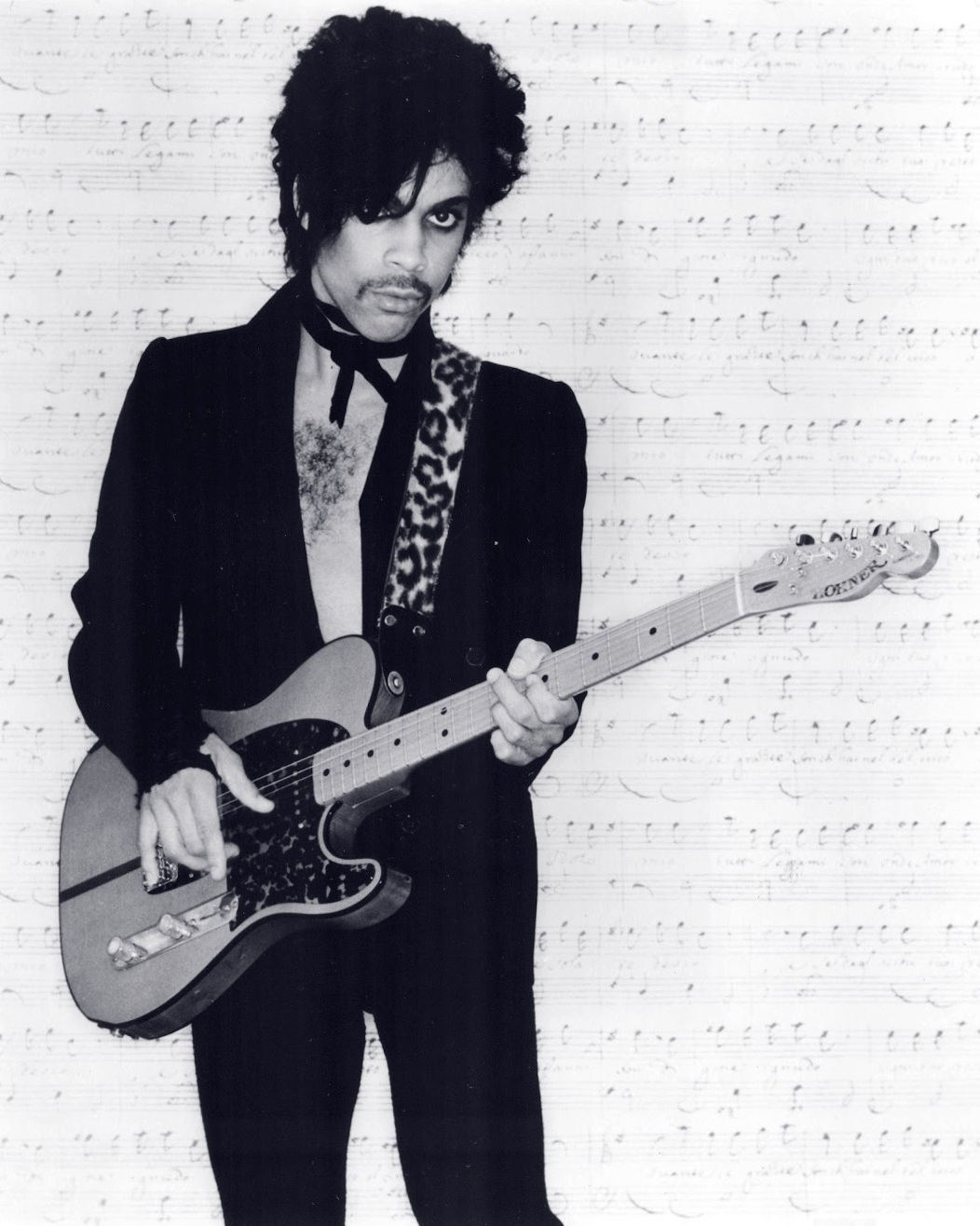
Prince, Worst Actor and Worst Director winner and Worst Original Song co-winner

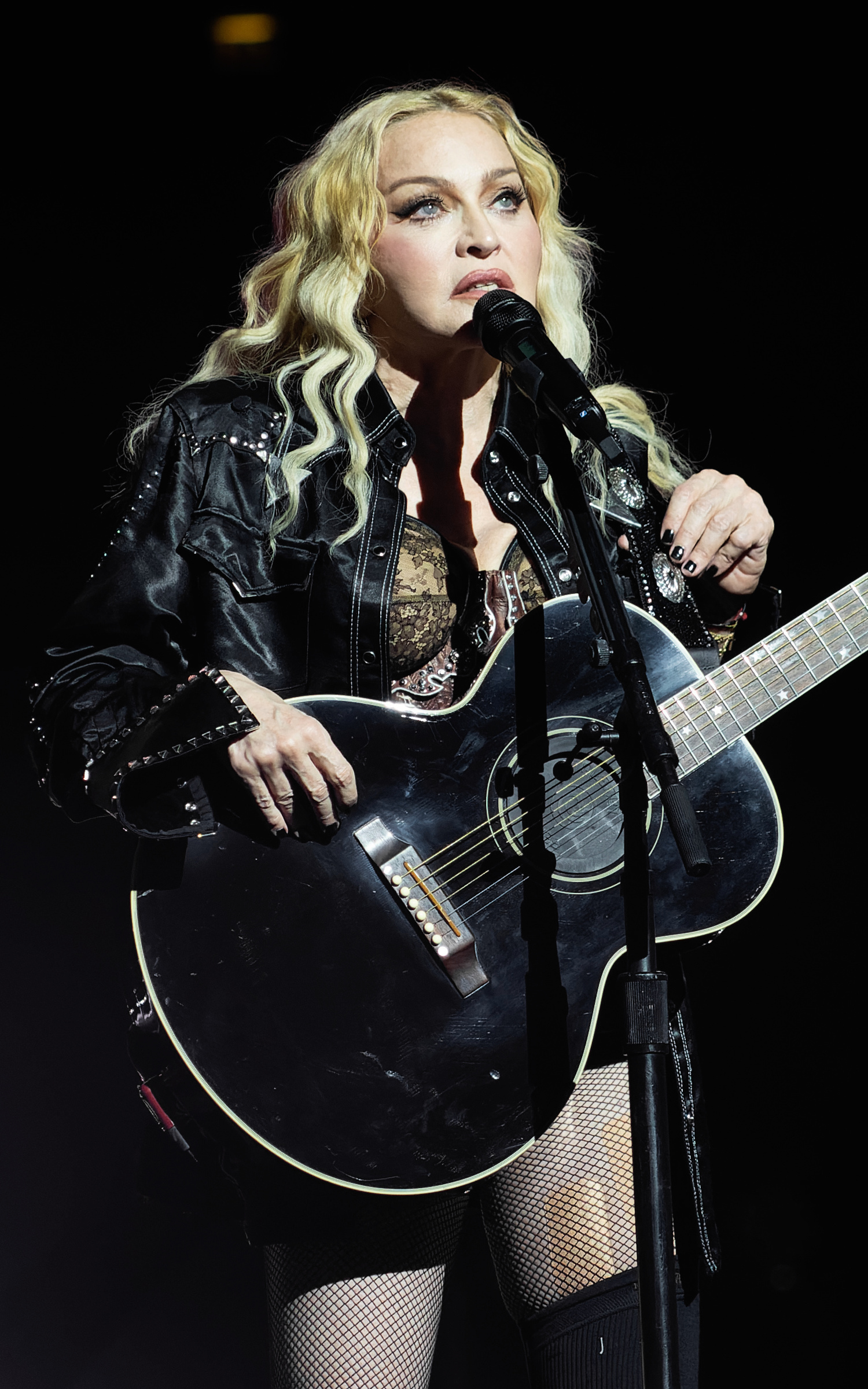
Madonna, Worst Actress winner

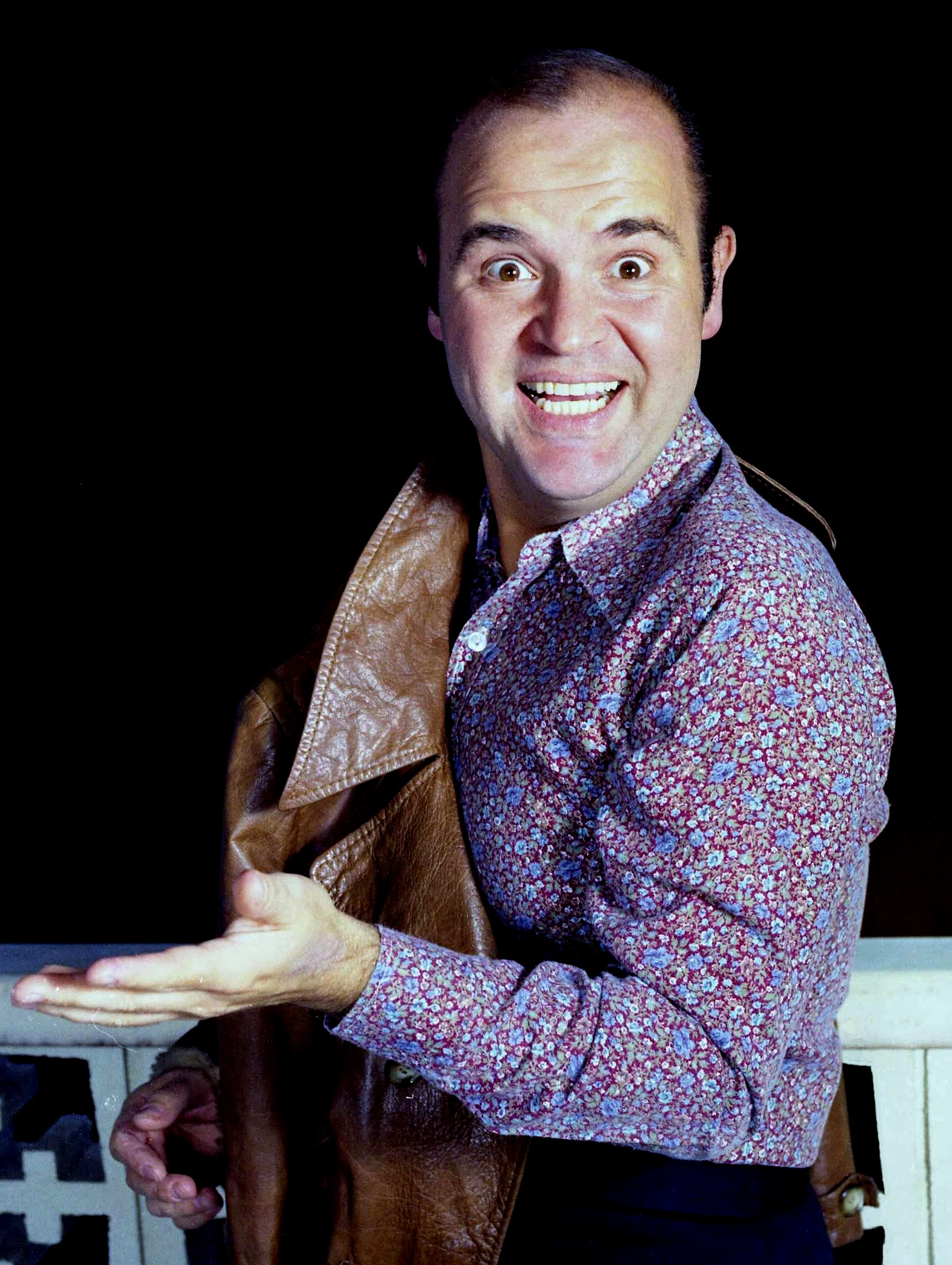
Dom DeLuise, Worst Supporting Actress winner

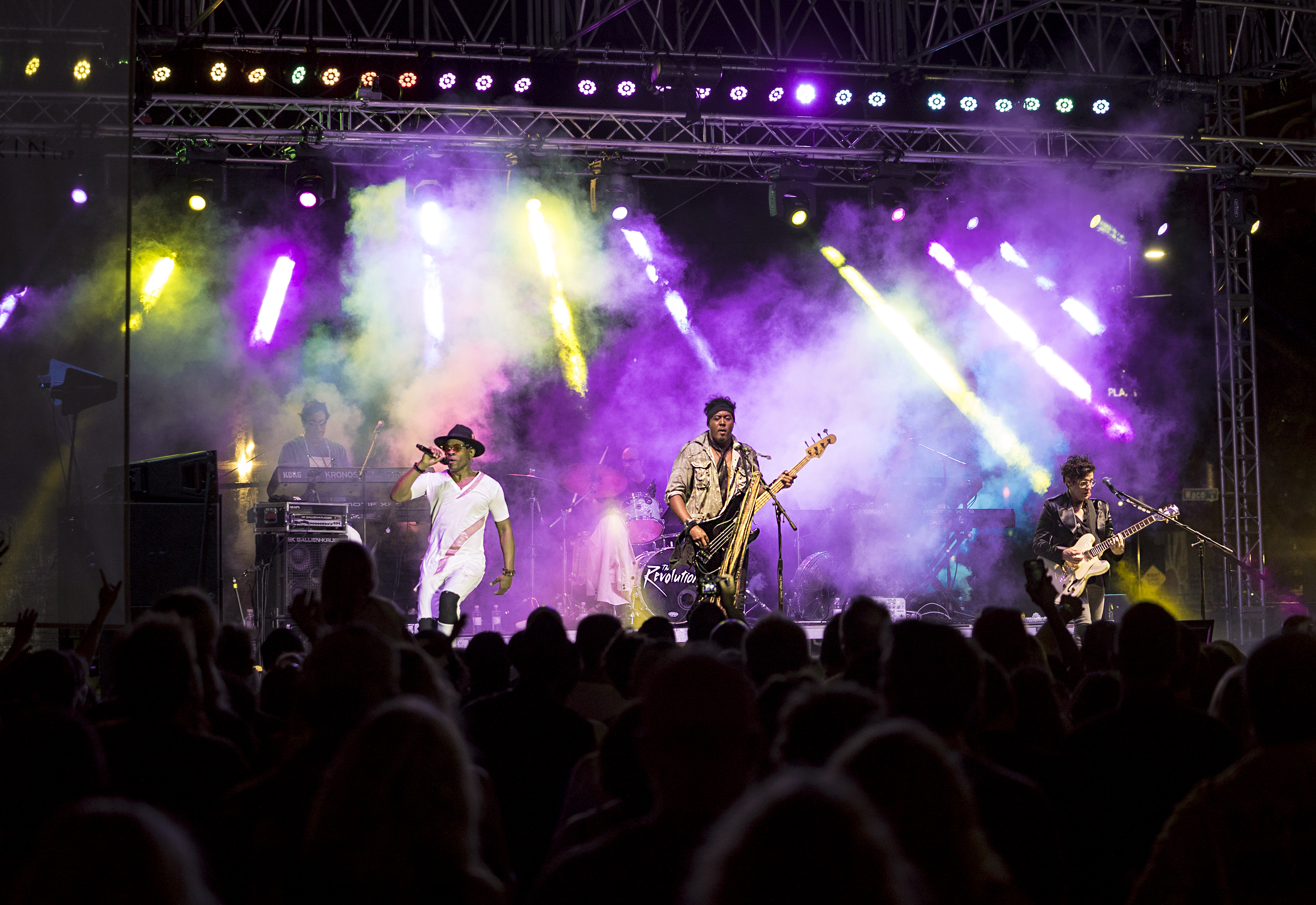
The Revolution, Worst Original Song co-winner

**Worst Picture**: **Howard the Duck (Universal) (tie)**; **Under the Cherry Moon (Warner Bros.) (tie)**; Blue City (Paramount); Cobra (Warner Bros.); Shanghai Surprise (MGM)	**Worst Director**: **Prince – Under the Cherry Moon**; Jim Goddard – Shanghai Surprise; Willard Huyck – Howard the Duck; Stephen King – Maximum Overdrive; Michelle Manning – Blue City
**Worst Actor**: **Prince – Under the Cherry Moon as Christopher Tracy**; Emilio Estevez – Maximum Overdrive as Bill Robinson; Judd Nelson – Blue City as Billy Turner; Sean Penn – Shanghai Surprise as Glendon Wasey; Sylvester Stallone – Cobra as Marion "Cobra" Cobretti	**Worst Actress**: **Madonna – Shanghai Surprise as Gloria Tatlock**; Kim Basinger – 9½ Weeks as Elizabeth McGraw; Joan Chen – Tai-Pan as May–May; Brigitte Nielsen – Cobra as Ingrid Knudsen; Ally Sheedy – Blue City as Annie Rayford
**Worst Supporting Actor**: **Jerome Benton – Under the Cherry Moon as Tricky**; Peter O'Toole – Club Paradise as Governor Anthony Cloyden Hayes; Tim Robbins – Howard the Duck as Phil Blumburtt; Brian Thompson – Cobra as The Night Slasher; Scott Wilson – Blue City as Perry Kerch	**Worst Supporting Actress**: **Dom DeLuise (in drag) – Haunted Honeymoon as Aunt Kate Abbot**; Louise Fletcher – Invaders from Mars as Mrs. McKeltch; Zelda Rubinstein – Poltergeist II: The Other Side as Tangina Barrons; Kristin Scott Thomas – Under the Cherry Moon as Mary Sharon; Beatrice Straight – Power as Claire Hastings
**Worst New Star**: **The six guys and gals in the duck suit – Howard the Duck**; Joan Chen – Tai-Pan as May–May; Mitch Gaylord – American Anthem as Steve Tevere; Kristin Scott Thomas – Under the Cherry Moon as Mary Sharon; Brian Thompson – Cobra as The Night Slasher	**Worst Screenplay**: **Howard the Duck – Willard Huyck and Gloria Katz, based on the Marvel Comics character created by Steve Gerber**; Cobra – Sylvester Stallone, based on the novel Fair Game by Paula Gosling; 9½ Weeks – Patricia Knop, Zalman King & Sarah Kernochan, based on the novel by Elizabeth McNeill; Shanghai Surprise – John Kohn and Robert Bentley, based on the novel Farraday's Flowers by Tony Kenrick; Under the Cherry Moon – Becky Johnston
**Worst Original Song**: **"Love or Money" from Under the Cherry Moon – Music and lyrics by Prince and the Revolution**; "Howard the Duck" from Howard the Duck – Music and lyrics by Thomas Dolby, Allee Willis and George S. Clinton; "I Do What I Do" from 9½ Weeks – Music and lyrics by Jonathan Elias, John Taylor and Michael Des Barres; "Life in a Looking Glass" from That's Life! – Music by Henry Mancini, Lyrics by Leslie Bricusse (also Oscar-nominated); "Shanghai Surprise" from Shanghai Surprise – Music and lyrics by George Harrison	**Worst Visual Effects**: **Howard the Duck – Visual effects by Industrial Light and Magic**; Invaders from Mars – Special visual effects by John Dykstra, Creatures designed by Stan Winston; King Kong Lives – Creature creations by Carlo Rambaldi
**Worst Career Achievement Award**: **Bruce the rubber shark** from Jaws (1975), Jaws 2 (1978) and Jaws 3-D (1983)

== Films with multiple nominations ==
The following films received multiple nominations:

Nominations	Films
8	Under the Cherry Moon
7	Howard the Duck
6	Cobra
6	Shanghai Surprise
5	Blue City
3	9½ Weeks
2	Invaders from Mars
2	Maximum Overdrive
2	Tai-Pan

== See also ==
- 1986 in film
- 59th Academy Awards
- 40th British Academy Film Awards
- 44th Golden Globe Awards
