= Asun (disambiguation) =

Asun is a spiced Yoruba barbecue meat delicacy.

Asun may also refer to:

- Protein asunder homolog or Mat89Bb, a protein encoded by the Asun gene
- Asun Balzola (1942–2006), Spanish illustrator, writer and translator
- Asun Martínez (born 2002), Spanish footballer
- Asun Ortega (born 1981), Spanish actress, singer-songwriter and model

== See also ==
- A Sun, a 2019 Taiwanese drama film
- Asun Zahleh, a village in Khuzestan Province, Iran
- Rumah Asun a settlement in Sarawak, Malaysia
