= Wuak =

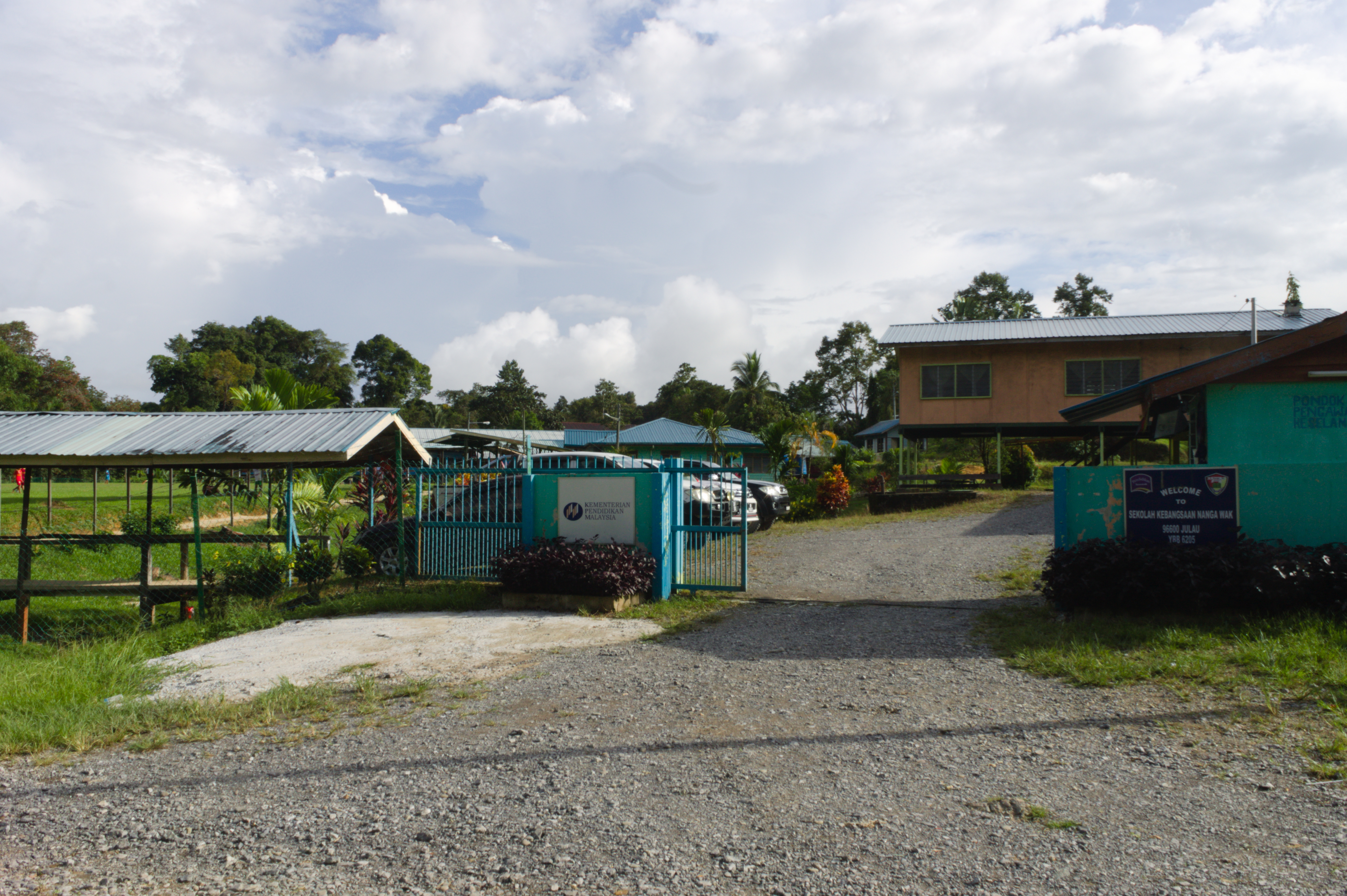
- Nanga Wak primary school

- Location within Borneo
- Coordinates: 1.83333°N 111.61667°E
- Country: Malaysia
- State: Sarawak
- Elevation: 69 m (226 ft)

Wuak is a rural settlement in Pakan District, Sarawak, Malaysia. It lies approximately 145.4 kilometres (90 mi) east of the state capital Kuching.

== History ==
An Iban warrior named Rentap built a fort at Wuak river before 1870.

== Geography ==
Neighbouring settlements include:

- Rumah Sait 1.9 kilometres (1.2 mi) west
- Rumah Jambai 1.9 kilometres (1.2 mi) north
- Rumah Nyumbang 2.6 kilometres (1.6 mi) southeast
- Rumah Galau 4.1 kilometres (2.5 mi) southeast
- Rumah Asun 5.6 kilometres (3.5 mi) east
- Betong 5.6 kilometres (3.5 mi) east
