= The Passover Plot (film) =

- Directed by: Michael Campus
- Written by: Millard Cohan; Patricia Louisianna Knop; Hugh J. Schonfield (novel)
- Produced by: Wolf Schmidt; Menahem Golan (executive)
- Starring: Zalman King; Harry Andrews; Hugh Griffith; Dan Hedaya; Donald Pleasence; Scott Wilson
- Cinematography: Adam Greenberg
- Edited by: Dov Hoenig
- Music by: Alex North
- Production companies: Atlas Film; Coast Industries; Golan-Globus
- Release date: 1976
- Running time: 108 minutes
- Countries: Israel; United States
- Language: English

The Passover Plot is a 1976 drama film adapted from the conspiratorial 1965 book of the same name by Hugh J. Schonfield. It was directed by Michael Campus and stars Zalman King as Yeshua (Jesus), Harry Andrews, Hugh Griffith, Dan Hedaya, Donald Pleasence and Scott Wilson.

== Awards ==
The Passover Plot was nominated for an Oscar for Best Costume Design (Mary Wills).
