= Asun Ortega =

Spanish actress, singer-songwriter and model

- Born: Asunción Ortega Vidal; October 8, 1981 (age 44); Murcia, Spain
- Modeling information
- Height: 5 ft 8 in (1.73 m)
- Hair color: Black
- Eye color: Brown
- Website: www.asunortega.info

Asunción "Asun" Ortega Vidal (born October 8, 1981) is a Spanish actress, singer-songwriter and model.

== Biography ==
=== Early life and acting career ===
Ortega is fluent in Spanish, German, and English and has acted in all three languages. She studied at the Ivana Chubbuck Studio and also with actress Patricia Velásquez.

She made her film debut in 2007 in the low-budget Chicano Blood, directed by Damian Chapa. Ortega played a supporting role in the film Mi Padre, directed by Giancarlo Candiano.

She has since worked with Evan Georgiades in God's Complex (2008) and Tom Madigan in Unfortunate Twilight (2008). She also appeared in television commercials.

She starred in Nude Nuns With Big Guns as Sister Sarah, the lead role.

Most recently she starred in Zalman King's final directorial effort Pleasure or Pain.

== Filmography ==
Year	Title	Role	Notes
2007	Chicano Blood	Lena	
2007	Mi Padre	Angela	
2007	The Latin Beauty	The Latin Beauty	Wrestling film
2007	Allan muerte al final de la pelicula	Hotel employee	TV movie
2007	Noir	Girlfriend	Short film
2007	Police Code	Lead	Video
2008	Unfortunate Twilight	The Seductress	
2008	Bikini Killers Club	Alexis	TV series
2008	Grand Theft Auto	Seidi	
2010	Nude Nuns with Big Guns	Sister Sarah	
2011	Martyrs (short film)	Lead Christian	Short film
2013	Pleasure or Pain	Girl from Barcelona	

== Discography ==
- "Wifey" – Asun Ortega / Mba Shakoor – October 2007

== asun Ortega ==
- Asun Ortega at IMDb
