= Audie England =

American actress (born 1967)

- Born: Adrienne Marie England; July 12, 1967 (age 59); Los Angeles, California, U.S.
- Occupations: Actress; photographer
- Years active: 1993–2000
- Spouse: Peter M. Lenkov
- Children: 4

Adrienne Marie "Audie" England (born July 12, 1967) is an American actress and professional photographer.

== Life and career ==
England was born in Los Angeles, California, and graduated from UCLA with a concentration in cinematography.

When she was 26, England was asked by Zalman King to star in his film version of Anaïs Nin's Delta of Venus. Since then, England has appeared in several Zalman King productions, including guest appearances on the film series Red Shoe Diaries. Audie also appeared in the music video of Don Henley's The Boys of Summer, which won the MTV Video Music Award for Video of the Year at the 1985 MTV Video Music Awards.

Besides being a regular in King's movies, England is best known for her role as Claire in Free Enterprise. She has appeared in 14 movies and has made several guest appearances on various television shows.

In 1998, England was voted one of People's "Most Beautiful Stars."

== Filmography ==
- Delta of Venus (1994) as Elena Martin
- Venus Rising (1995) as Eve
- Hercules: The Legendary Journeys (1996 TV) as Rheanna
- Miami Hustle (1996 TV) as Jean Ivers
- One Good Turn (1996) as Kristin
- Ice (1998 TV) as Julie
- A Place Called Truth (1998) as Lizzie
- Soundman (1998) as Francesca
- Legion (1998 TV) as Dr. Jones
- Mortal Kombat: Conquest (1999 TV) as Kitana
- Shame, Shame, Shame (1999) as Lani
- Free Enterprise (1999) as Claire
- Diagnosis Murder (1999 TV) as Chloe Marsden
