= Wild Orchid (film) =

1989 film by Zalman King

- Theatrical release poster
- Directed by: Zalman King
- Written by: Patricia Louisianna Knop; Zalman King
- Produced by: Mark Damon; Tony Anthony
- Starring: Mickey Rourke; Jacqueline Bisset; Carré Otis; Assumpta Serna
- Cinematography: Gale Tattersall
- Edited by: Marc Grossman; Glenn Morgan
- Music by: Geoff MacCormack; Simon Goldenberg
- Production company: Vision
- Distributed by: Triumph Releasing
- Release dates: December 22, 1989 (Italy); April 27, 1990 (United States)
- Running time: 105 minutes; 111 minutes (unrated)
- Country: United States
- Language: English
- Budget: $7 million
- Box office: $11.1 million

Wild Orchid is a 1989 American erotic romantic drama film directed by Zalman King and starring Mickey Rourke, Jacqueline Bisset, Carré Otis and Assumpta Serna. A sequel, Wild Orchid II: Two Shades of Blue, was released in 1991.

== Plot ==
Emily Reed travels to New York City to interview with a law firm, which offers her a job if she flies to Rio de Janeiro the following morning. Emily agrees and is introduced to Claudia Dennis, one of the firm's top executives. They arrive in Rio to finalize the purchase of a hotel, but Claudia must fly to Buenos Aires to meet the owner Elliot Costa. Claudia instructs Emily to cover her date that night. The date is a wealthy man named James Wheeler. They have dinner accompanied by Wheeler's bodyguards.

Wheeler intrigues Emily; he is quiet and asks personal questions without being demanding or rude. After dinner, they attend a street carnival. Emily leaves after a masked man who looks like Wheeler tries to seduce her. The next morning, Emily wakes to find Wheeler watching her. He gives her a bouquet of orchids and denies making advances toward her the previous evening. As an apology, he offers to show her the city.

Emily and Wheeler attend a party with Otto and Hanna Munch, a married couple they noticed in the restaurant. Navy sailors at the party make advances on Hanna; Wheeler fights them off, and he, Emily, Hanna and Otto leave in his limousine. Otto and Hanna are having problems because of Hanna's infidelity but she wants to reconcile with Otto. Wheeler encourages Hanna and Otto to have sex in the limo. Emily finds their actions disturbing. Emily and Wheeler visit the hotel that her firm wants to buy, and she tells Wheeler that she fears he would disappear if she touched him. When Emily hugs Wheeler, he pulls away, telling her he does not like being touched.

That night, Emily dresses up for the carnival festivities and is propositioned by a man in a mask who offers her his room key. Wheeler encourages her to accept. She realizes Wheeler is incapable of acting upon his own emotions and tries to experience passion through others. Emily agrees to the stranger's proposal and has sex with him.

Claudia returns to Rio with Elliot and arranges a meeting at the airport. Emily is humiliated when she discovers that Jerome McFarland, Elliot's attorney, is the stranger she slept with; Jerome uses their encounter to intimidate Emily into getting a better deal. Claudia discovers the truth and uses the information to threaten Jerome; if he does not complete the deal, she will tell his wife Cynthia about the affair. After the meeting, Claudia asks Emily about Wheeler. She tells Emily that Wheeler was an only child who stuttered and is a self-made man. Claudia confides that she has long been obsessed with Wheeler, but he has never touched her. Claudia's assistants Juan and Roberto tell her a man bought the deed to the hotel before the deal was finalized; both women realize it was Wheeler, who confirms it. Claudia proceeds with the hotel's sale, hoping to circumvent Wheeler's actions.

Claudia arranges a party to commemorate the sale of the hotel. The next morning, she invites a young surfer to her room and asks Emily to translate what the Portuguese surfer says. Claudia and the surfer are about to have sex, implying that Emily is free to join them, when Wheeler interrupts. Emily accuses Wheeler of setting people up to disappoint him and then throwing them aside. He responds that he never sets anybody up; they disappoint him of their own accord. A package is later delivered to Emily's room; Wheeler has signed over the hotel's deed, saving the deal. Emily finds Wheeler and tells him she loves him, but leaves when he does not respond.

That night, Emily returns to her room, where Wheeler is waiting for her. He tells Emily that after he accumulated wealth, women became attracted to him and he started playing games to keep things interesting. The games became a way of life, and he cannot stop playing them. Emily encourages Wheeler to reach out to her, offering him her love if he makes an effort to touch her. At first, he resists, but he reaches out and holds her when he thinks she will leave him. The two embrace and have sex. They later ride away on a motorcycle together.

== Cast ==
- Mickey Rourke as James Wheeler
- Jacqueline Bisset as Claudia Dennis
- Carré Otis as Emily Reed
- Assumpta Serna as Hanna Munch
- Bruce Greenwood as Jerome McFarland
- Jens Peter as Surfer
- Oleg Vidov as Otto Munch
- Milton Gonçalves as Flavio
- Paul Land as Big Sailor
- Michael Villella as Elliot Costa
- Bernardo Jablonski as Juan
- Luiz Lobo as Roberto
- David Rudder as Himself
- Simone Moreno as Herself
- Gerônimo as Singer

== Production ==
The film was shot in Salvador, Bahia, and Rio de Janeiro, Brazil. Zalman King's original version of the film was deemed too sexually graphic for an R-rating and the MPAA threatened to release it with an X-rating, limiting its commercial potential. King reluctantly removed part of a love scene between Carré Otis and Mickey Rourke to comply with the R-rating. The scene was widely rumored in the media to have shown the two actors—who had become romantically involved during production of the film—actually having intercourse. Both actors denied this, but King was ambiguous.

== Release ==
Wild Orchid had its world premiere on December 21, 1989, in Rome, Italy. The film opened in Los Angeles on April 27, 1990, and in New York City on April 28, 1990. On its opening week in Italy, it grossed $403,210 from 10 screens in six cities.

== Reception ==
Wild Orchid received negative reviews from critics around the time of its release. On the review aggregator website Rotten Tomatoes, the film holds an approval rating of 9% based on 32 reviews, with an average rating of 2.9/10. The website's critics consensus reads, "Wild Orchid is a tease-too-long, with overblown editing courtesy of an already slipping Mickey Rourke and inexperienced actress Carrie Otis."

It was nominated for two Golden Raspberry Awards, including Worst Actor (Mickey Rourke for this film and Desperate Hours) and Worst New Star (Carré Otis) at the 11th Golden Raspberry Awards.

== Soundtrack ==
Wild Orchid (Music from the Motion Picture)

Soundtrack album by various artists
- Released: April 24, 1990
- Length: 70:40
- Label: Sire / London/Rhino

Wild Orchid (Music from the Motion Picture)
No.	Title	Writer(s)	Performer	Length
1.	"Main Title"	Simon Goldenberg / Geoff MacCormack	Paradise	3:13
2.	"Elejibo"	Tropicalia Ytthamar / Rey Zulu	Margareth Menezes	4:17
3.	"Dark Secret"	Andy Paley / Paul Pesco / David Rudder / Jeff Vincent	David Rudder	4:52
4.	"Shake the Sheikh"	Marlon Klein / Uwe Mullrich	Dissidenten	4:42
5.	"I Want to Fly/Slave Dream"	Bezalel Aloni / Aharon Amram / Ofra Haza	Ofra Haza	7:03
6.	"Bird Boy"	Naná Vasconcelos	Naná Vasconcelos	4:33
7.	"Love Song"	Aloni	Haza	2:28
8.	"Twistin' with Annie"	Hank Ballard / Paley	Hank Ballard	1:29
9.	"Magic Jewelled Limousine"	Momo	NASA	5:03
10.	"Oxossi"	Gerônimo	Gerônimo	2:35
11.	"Children of Fire (Call of Xango)"	Paley / Pesco / Rudder / Vincent	Rudder	3:24
12.	"Promised Land"	Karl Hyde / Rick Smith / Alfie Thomas	Underworld	5:23
13.	"Flor Cubana"		Simone Moreno	2:50
14.	"Wheeler's Howl"	John Wesley Harding	Rhythm Methodists	4:23
15.	"Love Theme"	Goldenberg / MacCormack	Paradise	4:11
16.	"Just a Carnival"	Rudder	Rudder	5:17
17.	"Dark Secret"	Paley / Pesco / Rudder / Vincent	Menezes / Rudder	4:49
Total length:				01:10:40

== See also ==
- 9½ Weeks (film)
- Fifty Shades of Grey (film)
