= Toma Sik =

Hungarian-Israeli anarchist

Toma Ŝik
- Jesajáhú Tómá Sík
- Born: 17 August 1939; Óbuda, Budapest, Kingdom of Hungary
- Died: 13 July 2004 (aged 64); Kónyaszék, Csongrád District, Hungary
- Citizenship: Mondcivitan Republic
- Organizations: WRI; Gush Shalom; AI
- Movement: Secular humanism
- Father: Endre Schük

Yeshaayahu Toma Ŝik (Schück Tamás, Schuck Tamas; Hebrew: תומא סיק; 17 August 1939 – 13 July 2004) was a Hungarian-Israeli peace activist, anarchist, libertarian socialist, vegan, world citizen, and pioneer of the Israeli-Palestinian search for peace.

== Biography ==
Since he was a teenager and as a survivor of the Holocaust, Ŝik actively opposed Israeli militarism. He refused military service and counselled conscientious objectors for 30 years, and played a central role in the War Resisters International (WRI) chapter in Israel, as well as in Gush Shalom.

Ŝik was an active secular humanist proponent for human and civil rights for both Jews and Arabs. He worked as a columnist and translator at Al-Fajr English-language Palestinian weekly, and as a photographer for the Arab Studies Society in East Jerusalem. From 1974, he devoted himself merely to public activity, developing a simple living style. Ŝik was a familiar sight at demonstrations in central Israel for many years, where he would distribute leaflets written in his peculiar style.

Ŝik also worked at the WRI’s headquarters in London, was the central activist in Amnesty International Israel Branch and helped Alba Kör (Hungarian nonviolent movement for Peace) become a WRI Member. He was also a citizen of the Mondcivitan Republic.

For many years Ŝik supported the international language Esperanto. He also taught it to his children. He occasionally hosted Esperanto meetings in his Tel Aviv home and hosted foreign Esperantists there.

Ŝik left Israel in the late 1990s and ultimately settled down again in his country of birth, Hungary, where he died in 2004, overrun by a tractor during a nightly walk home through the fields to his newly-bought old farm where he was trying to establish an egalitarian agricultural commune of organic, humanist and vegan "new peasants". In his obituary his friends stated: "in the words of Joe Hill, Don't mourn, organise!".

== Legacy ==
The International Institute of Social History keeps a vast collection of Ŝik's papers in several languages, such as Hebrew, Hungarian, and English. The papers include documentation on the peace movement in Israel and especially Gush Shalom, periodicals and leaflets about sustainable and organic agriculture, the environment (e.g. in Eastern Europe), vegetarianism and veganism, and documentation about European unification, including newsletters from the European Anti-Maastricht Alliance.

== See also ==
- List of peace activists
