= Bronk (TV series) =

American television series

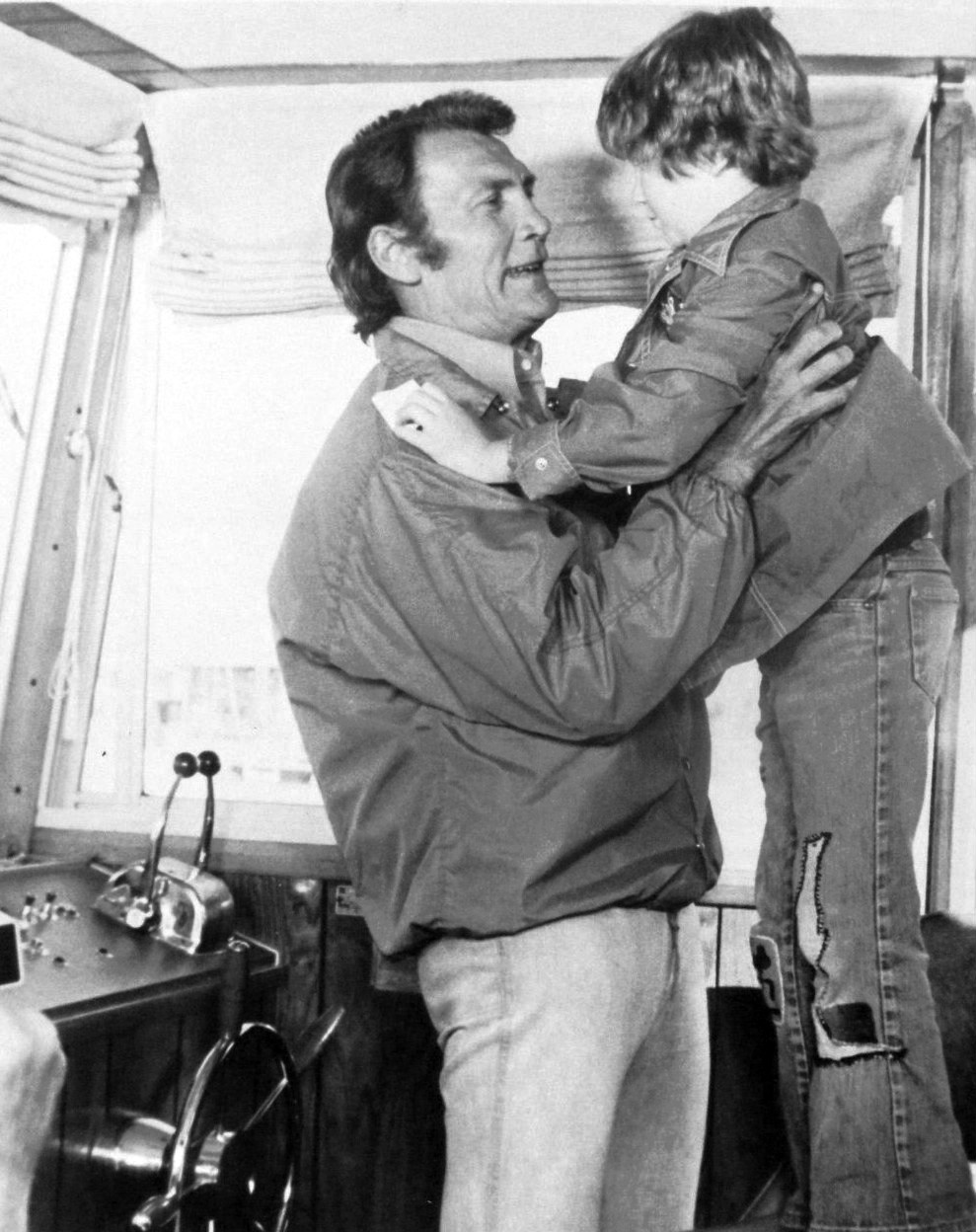
- Jack Palance and Robbie Rist from the show's premiere, 1975.
- Created by: Carroll O'Connor
- Starring: Jack Palance; Henry Beckman; Tony King; Joseph Mascolo; Ron Thompson
- Composer: Lalo Schifrin
- Country of origin: United States
- Original language: English
- No. of seasons: 1
- No. of episodes: 24

Production
- Executive producers: Carroll O'Connor; Bruce Geller
- Running time: 60 minutes (per episode)
- Production companies: Carnan-Becker Productions; MGM Television

Original release
- Network: CBS
- Release: September 21, 1975 – March 28, 1976

Bronk is an American drama series created by Carroll O'Connor, who was also the executive producer, and starring Jack Palance as Detective Lieutenant Alex Bronkov. The series is set in the fictional Ocean City, California.

The series aired on Sundays at 10:00 pm (EST) from September 21, 1975, to March 28, 1976, on CBS.

== Cast ==
- Jack Palance as Lt. Alex Bronkov
- Joseph Mascolo as Mayor Pete Santori
- Henry Beckman as Harry Mark
- Tony King as Sgt. John Webber
- Dina Ousley as Ellen Bronkov

== Episodes ==
| No. | Title | Directed by | Written by | Original release date |
|---|---|---|---|---|
| 0 | "Pilot" | Richard Donner | Story by : Carroll O'Connor & Ed Waters; Teleplay by : Al Martinez & Ed Waters | April 17, 1975 |
| 1 | "Open Contract" | Richard Donner | Charles Sailor & Eric Kaldor | September 21, 1975 |
| 2 | "Wheel of Death" | Sutton Roley | Del Reisman | September 28, 1975 |
| 3 | "The Gauntlet" | John Peyser | Stephen Kandel | October 5, 1975 |
| 4 | "Echo of Danger" | Reza Badiyi | Jack Turley | October 12, 1975 |
| 5 | "Terror" | Stuart Hagmann | Karl & Terence Tunberg | October 19, 1975 |
| 6 | "The Fifth Victim" | Russ Mayberry | Robert I. Holt | October 25, 1975 |
| 7 | "Short Fuse" | Corey Allen | Carey Wilber | November 2, 1975 |
| 8 | "Line of Fire" | Don Weis | Burton Armus | November 9, 1975 |
| 9 | "Bargain in Blood" | John Peyser | Shimon Wincelberg | November 16, 1975 |
| 10 | "The Pickoff" | Sutton Roley | Robert W. Lenski | November 23, 1975 |
| 11 | "Crackback" | John Peyser | Lou Morheim | November 30, 1975 |
| 12 | "Deception" | Corey Allen | Larry Forrester | December 7, 1975 |
| 13 | "Betrayal" | Paul Krasny | Larry Alexander | December 14, 1975 |
| 14 | "There's Gonna Be a War" | Paul Krasny | Al Martinez | December 21, 1975 |
| 15 | "Next of Kin" | Sutton Roley | Bruce Geller & Earl W. Wallace | January 4, 1976 |
| 16 | "The Deadlier Sex" | Alex March | Stephen Kandel | January 18, 1976 |
| 17 | "Jackson Blue" | Sutton Roley | Michael Mann | January 25, 1976 |
| 18 | "Long Time Dying" | Reza Badiyi | Alan Godfrey | February 1, 1976 |
| 19 | "Target: Unknown" | Sutton Roley | Robert I. Holt | February 8, 1976 |
| 20 | "Jailbreak" | Allen Baron | Carey Wilber | February 15, 1976 |
| 21 | "Vengeance" | Sutton Roley | Burton Armus | February 22, 1976 |
| 22 | "The Ordeal" | Ric Rondell | Oliver Crawford | March 7, 1976 |
| 23 | "Death with Honor" | Allen Barron | Story by : Dan Ullman; Teleplay by : Michael Mann | March 21, 1976 |
| 24 | "The Vigilante" | Sutton Roley | Story by : Bruce Geller & Leigh Vance; Teleplay by : Robert Lenski | March 28, 1976 |

== Home media ==
On June 4, 2019, Warner Bros. released Bronk- The Complete Series on DVD via their Warner Archive Collection. This is a manufacture-on-demand (MOD) release, available through Warner's online store and Amazon.com.
