= Bride of the Wind =

2001 film by Bruce Beresford

- Film poster
- Directed by: Bruce Beresford
- Written by: Marilyn Levy
- Based on: Life of Alma Mahler
- Produced by: Margit Bimler; Gerald Green; Frank Hübner; Evzen Kolar; Lawrence Levy
- Starring: Sarah Wynter; Jonathan Pryce; Vincent Perez; Simon Verhoeven
- Cinematography: Peter James
- Edited by: Timothy Wellburn
- Music by: Stephen Endelman
- Distributed by: Paramount Classics
- Release date: 8 June 2001 (US)
- Running time: 99 minutes
- Countries: United Kingdom; Germany; Austria
- Language: English
- Box office: $419,414

Bride of the Wind is a 2001 period drama directed by Academy Award–nominee Bruce Beresford and written by first-time screenwriter Marilyn Levy. Loosely based on the life of Alma Mahler, Bride of the Wind recounts Alma's marriage to the composer Gustav Mahler and her romantic liaisons. The title of the film alludes to a painting by Oskar Kokoschka named Die Windsbraut, literally meaning The Bride of the Wind, though often translated as The Tempest. The artist dedicated this painting to Alma Mahler.

The film received negative reviews from critics and did poorly at the box office.

== Poster art ==
The film poster artwork depicts Alma reclining on a chaise longue attended by a lover, with a field of flowers in the background. Alma's dress, her hair, the chaise, the field of flowers and even the air are replete with many of the stylistic elements of paintings by Gustav Klimt.

== Cast ==
- Sarah Wynter as Alma Mahler
- Jonathan Pryce as Gustav Mahler
- Vincent Perez as Oskar Kokoschka
- Simon Verhoeven as Walter Gropius
- Gregor Seberg as Franz Werfel
- Dagmar Schwarz as Anna Sofie Schindler-Moll
- Wolfgang Hübsch as Carl Moll
- August Schmölzer as Gustav Klimt
- Johannes Silberschneider as Alexander von Zemlinsky
- Hans Steunzer as Richard Strauss
- Robert Herzl as Arnold Schoenberg

== Reception ==
On Rotten Tomatoes the film has an approval rating of 11% based on reviews from 64 critics. On Metacritic the film has a score of 35% based on reviews from 26 critics, indicating "generally unfavorable" reviews.
