= Dina Ousley =

American businesswoman

- Occupations: Businesswoman, makeup artist, and former actress

Dina Ousley is an American businesswoman, makeup artist, and former actress. Ousley developed tools and techniques for airbrush makeup, helping to refine and popularize this method of applying makeup.

== Biography ==
Ousley is from Fort Worth, Texas. She attended Northside High School. Ousley later attended Henri Bendel's school for hair styling in New York.

== Career ==
Ousley appeared in the 1975-season CBS TV series Bronk, playing star Jack Palance's daughter with a disability, Ellen Bronkov. She had a small part in the highly successful 1975 film Shampoo, and later appeared in Trip With The Teacher, American Hot Wax, The Boss' Son, and Nights in White Satin.

At the same time that Ousley was working as an actress, she had also started working as a hairdresser. As a hairdresser, she did the hair of celebrities such as Robert Blake, Helen Reddy and Herb Alpert.

Ousley then turned to makeup work and opened her own company, Dinair, in North Hollywood. She designed a makeup airbrush which sprays foundation and body paint. The spray makeup tools and techniques she developed include "...the use of a small airbrush, liquid cosmetics and stencils to create everything from a professional woman's daily makeup to something a little flashier - think leopard print hair and fantasy makeup that includes sparkles." She called her airbrush products Dinair Airbrush Makeup Systems, Inc. The Chicago Tribune wrote that Dinair "pioneered the makeup airbrush."

Ousley airbrushed "lingerie" on Playboy models for Hugh Hefner's 1999 New Year's Eve party and spray-painted the go-go girls in the Austin Powers movies. Her airbrushes have been sold at Nordstrom and inspired other makeup artists to create their own versions.
