= Trip with the Teacher =

1975 American film

- Directed by: Earl Barton
- Written by: Earl Barton
- Produced by: Earl Barton
- Starring: Brenda Fogarty; Zalman King; Robert Gribbin; Robert Porter; Dina Ousley; Jill Voigt; Cathy Worthington; Jack Driscoll; Susan Russell
- Cinematography: Erwin Jay Barer
- Edited by: Erwin Jay Barer
- Music by: Igo Kantor
- Production company: Crown International Pictures
- Release date: March 1975
- Running time: 95 minutes
- Country: United States
- Language: English
- Budget: $11,000

Trip with the Teacher is a 1975 exploitation film written, produced and directed by Earl Barton. The film has been retitled several times and has been referred to as Deadly Field Trip (VHS release), Duell bis zum Verrecken (Germany), Kiss the Teacher...Goodbye (American promotional title), and Stupro selvaggio (Italy).

== Synopsis ==
Four teenage girls (along with their teacher and bus driver) from Los Angeles are on a field trip in the desert. On the way to their destination, their bus breaks down. While stranded, they are approached by three bikers. When Jay (one of the bikers) tries to help the bus driver, the other two bikers start to harass the four girls. As soon as the teacher (Miss Tenny) observes this, she immediately defends the girls; however, she is assaulted for her interruption. After a few scuffles, the group of bikers decides to help the stranded bunch and tow them to a remote cabin, with less-than-good intentions in store. Another altercation ensues, when Al's promise to take them to safety is now obviously broken. Almost as soon as the bus driver (Marvin) steps in, he is run over and killed by Al and his brother, Pete. To keep everyone quiet, Al and Pete hold everyone hostage in the abandoned cottage near the murder site.

== Cast ==
- Brenda Fogarty as Miss Tenny
- Robert Gribbin as Jay
- Zalman King as Al
- Robert Porter as Pete
- Dina Ousley as Bobbie
- Jill Voigt as Tina
- Cathy Worthington as Julie
- Susan Russell as Pam
- Jack Driscoll as Marvin
- Edward Cross as Station Attendant
- David Villa as Station Customer

== See also ==
- List of American films of 1975
