= Brent David Fraser =

American actor and musician

- Born: February 21, 1967 (age 59); Bremerton, Washington, U.S.
- Occupation: Actor

Brent David Fraser (born February 21, 1967) is an American actor and musician. He was born in Bremerton, Washington. Also credited as Brent Fraser, his featured roles include Wild Orchid II: Two Shades of Blue, Dead & Breakfast, The Chocolate War Spooner, The Little Death, Tall as Trees and Fame L.A.. He also portrayed a young Jim Morrison in an episode of Dark Skies.

== Filmography ==
=== Film ===
- The Chocolate War (1988) .... Emile Janza
- Spooner (1989)
- Book of Love (1990) .... Meatball
- Wild at Heart (1990) (as Brent Fraser) .... Idiot Punk
- Class of 1999 (1990) .... Flavio
- Jezebel's Kiss (1990) .... Hunt Faberman
- Wild Orchid II: Two Shades of Blue (1991) .... Joshua
- Plymouth (1991) (TV) .... Litchfield
- The Can (1994)
- Dark Side of Genius (1994) .... Julian Jons
- The Little Death (1996) .... Nick
- Mixed Blessings (1998) .... Derek
- Broken Vessels (1998) .... Jed
- Farewell to Harry (2002) .... Mickey
- Dead & Breakfast (2004) .... The Drifter
- The Memory Thief (2006) .... Pound Custodian
- Tall as Trees (2008) .... William

=== Television ===
- The Tracey Ullman Show (1990) episode: "Her First Grownup" - Jimmy
- Dark Skies (1997) episode: "The Last Wave" - Jim Morrison
- Fame L.A. (1997) episode: "Who Do You Love?" - Brent Legget
- The Outer Limits (1998) episode: "The Vaccine" - Graham

== Stage ==
- Maxwell in Always - but Not Forever by Henry Jaglom, Edgemar Center for the Arts, Santa Monica, 2007
