= Wild Orchid II: Two Shades of Blue =

- Theatrical release poster
- Directed by: Zalman King
- Written by: Zalman King
- Produced by: Rafael Eisenman; David Saunders
- Starring: Wendy Hughes; Tom Skerritt; Robert Davi; Brent Fraser; Nina Siemaszko
- Cinematography: Marc Reshovsky
- Edited by: James Gavin Bedford; Marc Grossman
- Music by: George S. Clinton
- Production company: Vision PDG
- Distributed by: Triumph Releasing Corporation
- Release dates: October 31, 1991 (Portugal); May 8, 1992 (US)
- Running time: 111 minutes
- Country: United States
- Language: English

Wild Orchid II: Two Shades of Blue is a 1991 American drama romance film written and directed by Zalman King and starring Nina Siemaszko. It is an in-name only sequel to the 1989 film Wild Orchid.

== Plot ==
In 1958 California, 16-year-old girl Blue McDonald travels from town to town with her father, drug-addicted musician Ham McDonald. While passing through a small town, Blue meets Josh Winslow, a young man who flirts with her on his way to church. In Sacramento, Ham gets a job at a jazz club. After a show, Ham uses all the money he earned to buy heroin. While attempting to quit using, Ham goes through withdrawal pains. Blue eventually mentions to Jules, the club's owner, what Ham is going through. Jules offers to give her some heroin in exchange for sex. Blue allows Jules to take her virginity and then delivers the heroin to Ham. After learning how she obtained it, an angry Ham takes the heroin, enters his car and later dies in a crash.

Days later, Elle, a madame who used to know Ham, approaches Blue and offers her a job as a prostitute. Believing that she has no other option, Blue goes to Elle's brothel, a mansion outside the city. There, Elle forces Blue to strip naked and then coaches her in the art of seduction. Blue eventually learns how to remain calm while working with clients. One day, Josh and his father, Colonel Winslow, visit the brothel. Winslow has brought Josh to lose his virginity. Josh does not recognize Blue, who, after donning a wig, leads him into her room. There, they have sex. Blue later partakes with other prostitutes in a bachelor party for wealthy client J.J. Clark. Irritated by J.J.'s arrogance, Blue strips in the middle of the party and taunts J.J. to do the same. Elle later warns Blue never to humiliate a client again or she will be physically harmed.

Later, Senator Todd Dixon, one of Blue's first clients, sends for her. "Sully" Sullivan, Elle's middle-aged driver, bodyguard and bouncer, drives Blue to Dixon's hotel. There, she is ambushed by Dixon, a bodyguard and two other men with a film camera and lights. Despite her protests, the cameraman films as a hood is placed over Blue's head and she is handcuffed to the bed. Sully interrupts the stag film in progress. Dixon draws a gun, but Sully overpowers him and escapes with Blue.

After learning that Blue wants to quit prostitution and start over, Sully gives her a bag with over $5,000 in cash that he stole from Dixon's room. Blue asks Sully if he would like to flee with her and he agrees. The two settle in the same town where Blue first saw Josh. They settle in a small house with Sully play-acting as Blue's father. Blue enrolls in a high school, makes new friends and begins dating Josh, who does not recognize her from the brothel. Weeks later, Elle shows up at the school, pretending to be Blue's mother. As a result of Blue running away, Elle was forced to compensate Dixon the money that was stolen and also forced to use three of her girls to finish the stag film. Elle threatens Blue to return to Sacramento with her, but Blue calls her bluff.

The next evening, Blue goes to Josh's football game and consoles him when his team loses. Afterwards, Winslow beckons Josh, and Blue follows them to a building on campus where Elle awaits with a film projector. Winslow and Elle screen the stag film for Josh, who recognizes Blue's face onscreen. Blue bursts in, yells at them to turn off the film, and asks who any of them are to judge her. Josh follows her out, but she evades him. Elle forces Blue into her car for the drive back to Sacramento, but Sully appears and drives them off the road. Sully pulls Blue out of the backseat and after an armed standoff, Elle decides to let him and Blue go. Blue then continues to live with Sully and attend high school. Josh eventually approaches Blue on her way to school and admits that he was disoriented when he discovered that she had been a prostitute. After Josh confesses that he has always loved her, the two embrace.

== Cast ==
- Nina Siemaszko as Blue McDonald
- Wendy Hughes as Elle
- Tom Skerritt as Ham McDonald
- Robert Davi as "Sully" Sullivan
- Brent David Fraser as Joshua Winslow
- Christopher McDonald as Senator Todd Dixon
- Joe Dallesandro as Jules
- Casey Sander as Captain Edwards
- Stafford Morgan as Colonel Winslow
- Don Bloomfield as J.J. Clark
- Liane Curtis as Mona
- Bridgit Ryan as Ruth
- Lydie Denier as Dominique
- Gloria Reuben as Celeste
- Victoria Mahoney as Mary
- Cindyana Santangelo as Girl in Brothel
- Kathy Hartsell as Cathy
- Lynn Gendron as Del
- Frank Cavestani as Business Man
- Monica Ekblad as Ida
- Ben Hartigan as Elderly Gentleman
