= Maxie Santillan Jr. =

American actor

- Born: January 18, 1956
- Died: March 22, 2022 (aged 66)
- Occupation: Actor
- Years active: 2003–2021

Maxie Santillan Jr. (18 January 1956 – 22 March 2022) was an American actor known for minor roles in Pirates of the Caribbean: The Curse of the Black Pearl and It's Always Sunny in Philadelphia. He is often credited as "Maxie J. Santillan Jr.".

== Filmography ==
=== Film ===
Year	Title	Role	Notes
2003	Pirates of the Caribbean: The Curse of the Black Pearl	Maximo	
2004	The SpongeBob SquarePants Movie	Gummy the Pirate	
2005	Che Guevara	Chao	
2006	Sell Out	Dragon Fang	Short
2008	Mutant Vampire Zombies from the 'Hood!	Old Man / Jorge Gonzales	
2009	Life Is Hot in Cracktown	Slimy Drunk	Uncredited
2010	Everything Will Happen Before You Die	Monk	
2010	Nude Nuns with Big Guns	Mr. Foo	
2010	Food Stamps	ChooChoo	
2011	Invisible	Hal	Short
2011	Hyenas	Salazar	
2012	We the Party	Mystic	
2012	Ninjito: Mexican Ninja	El Borracho	Short
2012	Scary or Die	Gonzalez Sr.	
2015	The Time We're In	Mystic	Short
2016	Gehenna: Where Death Lives	Old Native	
2018	Something Horrible	Briden	
2020	The Lady of the Dead	Victor	
2021	Welcome to Our World	ChooChoo	(final film role)

=== Television ===
Year	Title	Role	Notes
2006-2007	My Name Is Earl	Sparky	2 episodes
2007	The Universe	Shaman	Episode: "Beyond the Big Bang"
2007	CSI: Crime Scene Investigation	Homeless Man	Episode: "Lying Down with Dogs"
2007-2010	It's Always Sunny in Philadelphia	Grizzled Busman	2 episodes
2010-2012	Pair of Kings	Stately Islander	5 episodes
2011	Shameless	Vagrant	Episode: "Frank the Plank"
2012	The Eric Andre Show	Himself	2 episodes
2012	Tales of the Frontier	Jose Sanchez	2 episodes
2012	1000 Ways to Die	Wang-Chung	Episode: "Tweets from the Dead"
2015	Rent Control	Gabriel	Episode: "Garage"
2015	Criminal Minds	Homeless Man	Episode: "Til Death Do Us Part"
2017	Disjointed	Guy with Walker	Episode: "Donna Weed"
