= Delta of Venus (film) =

1994 American film that was released in 1995

- Theatrical release poster
- Directed by: Zalman King
- Written by: Elisa M. Rothstein; Patricia Louisianna Knop
- Based on: Delta of Venus by Anaïs Nin
- Produced by: Evzen Kolar
- Starring: Costas Mandylor; Eric da Silva; Marek Vasut; Zette; Emma Louise Moore; Raven Snow; Rory Campbell; Audie England
- Cinematography: Eagle Egilsson
- Edited by: James Gavin Bedford; Marc Grossman
- Music by: George S. Clinton
- Production companies: Alliance Communications Corporation; New Line Cinema; Evzen Kolar Productions
- Distributed by: New Line Cinema
- Release date: June 9, 1995
- Running time: 99 minutes (102 minutes for NC-17 version)
- Country: United States
- Language: English
- Box office: $63,174

Delta of Venus is a 1994 American erotic drama film directed by Zalman King and starring Audie England, Costas Mandylor, and Marek Vašut. It is inspired by the posthumously published 1977 short story collection Delta of Venus by Anaïs Nin. NC-17 and R-rated versions of the film exist; the NC-17 rating is due to explicit sex. The DVD release contains both versions of the film. The film was released in June 1995 in the United States.

== Plot ==
Set in Paris, France, in 1940 in the early days of World War II before the German invasion and conquest of France, Elena Martin is a young American writer struggling to get by in Paris while searching for inspiration for her first novel. Elena meets and has a sordid affair with a fellow American expatriate named Lawrence Walters. With some encouragement from her friends, her lover, and her publisher, Elena gets involved in nude modeling and progresses onward through many other forms of voyeuristic and participatory sexual adventures as she further researches for inspiration to write her book and become an author of erotic fiction.

== Cast ==
- Audie England as Elena Martin
- Costas Mandylor as Lawrence Walters
- Eric Da Silva as Marcel
- Raven Snow as Leila
- Rory Campbell as Miguel
- Emma Louise Moore as Ariel
- Bernard Zette as Donald (as Zette)
- Marek Vasut as Luc
- Markéta Hrubesová as Bijou
- Daniel Leza as Pierre
- Stephen Halbert as Harry
- Dale Wyatt as Millicent
- Jirí Ded as Priest
- Valérie Zawadská as Landlady
- James Donahower as Bandleader
- Robert Davi as The Collector
- Adewale Akinnuoye-Agbaje as The Clairvoyant (as Wale)
- Clive Revill as Radio Announcer (voice)
- Roberta Hanley as Opium Den Proprietor

== Background ==
The short story collection by Anaïs Nin on which the film is based is not autobiographical, nor does it have a frame narrative. The film imposes a frame-narrative about a "Nin-like" American who begins an affair with another expatriate American in pre–World War II Paris, and who writes erotic stories that represent her fantasies. Some of these stories/fantasies, based on those of Nin, are explored on-screen.

== Reception ==
On the review aggregator website Rotten Tomatoes, 0% of 5 critics' reviews are positive, with an average rating of 4.4/10.
