= Evzen Kolar =

Czech film producer

Evzen Kolar (July 8, 1950 – July 11, 2017) was a Czech film producer. Born in Brno, he acted on film and television from an early age. Kolar moved to directing televised work and was also known for directing commercials. He was based in London before relocating to the United States in 1979. Kolar worked for Fireline Productions and Crossover Films Entertainment before starting his own company KPI Entertainment in 1993. He died in Los Angeles at the age of 67 in 2017.

His children by Deborah, daughter of actor Robert Shaw, are musicians Rachel and Rob Kolar, of He's My Brother She's My Sister.

== Selected filmography ==
- Never Say Never Again (1983)
- Surf Ninjas (1993)
- Delta of Venus (1994)
- City of Industry (1997)
- Inferno (1999)
- Bride of the Wind (2001)
- The Boys from County Clare (2003)
