= Venus Rising =

- Directed by: Leora Barish; Edgar Michael Bravo
- Written by: Leora Barish; Henry Bean
- Produced by: Albert T. Dickerson III; Johnna Levine; Thomas Small
- Starring: Billy Wirth; Audie England; Costas Mandylor; Morgan Fairchild; Meredith Salenger; Jessica Alba; Joel Grey
- Cinematography: John Thomas
- Edited by: Edgar Michael Bravo; James Fletcher
- Music by: Deborah Holland
- Release date: November 30, 1995
- Running time: 84 minutes
- Country: United States
- Language: English

Venus Rising is a 1995 erotic science fiction film starring Billy Wirth, Audie England, and Costas Mandylor. Actress Morgan Fairchild has a very small part in the film. The directors were Leora Barish and gay independent filmmaker Edgar Bravo.

== Plot summary ==
Eve (Audie England) grows up on a privately run prison island. She finds a boat left by a man who had shipwrecked on the island's coast. When her guardian tries to rape her, she kills him by removing a security device implanted in his arm and then takes the boat to escape the island.

Once on land, Eve prostitutes herself to a stranger in exchange for money and food. After sex, they argue and the man tries to rape her, but she stabs him in the side, killing him, and leaves his body on the beach. While the police start investigating the man's death, the private corporation that runs the island prison notices that someone has escaped and begins a search.

Eve befriends a rich woman who takes her home and provides food and fine clothes. The woman also introduces Eve to a virtual world inhabited by those who can afford it. The woman is a divorcee living off her former husband's alimony. The woman commits suicide the next day, leaving Eve in the mansion to assume her identity and alimony (as the ex-husband pays electronically and never visits). Flashbacks show Eve as a little girl (Jessica Alba) and the daughter of a guard living on the island during a prisoners' riot. After her father was murdered and her mother raped and murdered, Eve was kept under the care of one of the inmates (the one she kills at the beginning of the movie) who apparently molested her for years and kept her as a servant, prompting her distrust towards men and sex in general.

She goes into the virtual world and visits a bar run by Peyton (Fairchild), where she meets Vegas (Mandylor), the policeman investigating the murder on the beach. There, they become lovers. While she's reluctant at first, she finally gives in to the relationship. Vegas finally finds her, as does one of the agents of the penal corporation who tracks her. The two men have a gunfight in the apartment, and the corporation agent is killed. Eve and Vegas then continue their relationship.

== Reception ==
A review in VideoHound's Sci-Fi Experience called Venus Rising "a real mess", explaining that "the film lacks special effects or a strong vision of the near future...It also lacks a decent plot and interesting characters."
