= Carré Otis =

American model and actress

- Born: September 28, 1968 (age 58); San Francisco, California, U.S.
- Occupations: Model; actress
- Spouses: Mickey Rourke (m. 1992; div. 1998) Matthew Sutton (m. 2005)
- Children: 2

Carré Brennan Otis (born September 28, 1968) is an American model and actress.

== Early life ==
Otis was born in San Francisco, and raised in Marin County, California, along with her older sister Chrisse and her younger brother Jordan. She attended Marin Academy in San Rafael, California, and the John Woolman School in Nevada City, California.

== Career ==
=== Early modeling ===
Otis ran away from home at 16. A year later, while living with an abusive boyfriend in San Francisco, Otis was scouted, by Look Model Agency and was initially signed to Elite Model Management in New York by John Casablancas. She first achieved fame after being sent to Elite in Paris, when she appeared on the cover of French Elle in April 1986. Over the next several years, she appeared on covers in the American and foreign editions of Vogue, Harper's Bazaar, Cosmopolitan, Allure, Mirabella, and Marie Claire. In 1991, Bruce Weber photographed Otis, in San Francisco, California.

Otis appeared in ads for Guess jeans (1988), Calvin Klein jeans (1991), the 1996 Pirelli calendar, and also posed for the Sports Illustrated swimsuit edition (2000). Otis is the model on the poster above the character Rusty Griswald's bed in the 1989 film National Lampoon's Christmas Vacation. Otis was also featured in 1990 and 2000 issues of Playboy magazine. Otis has walked the runway for Max Mara, Dolce & Gabbana, Gucci, Ermanno Scervino, Todd Oldham and Donna Karan.

=== Acting ===
In 1989, Otis made her acting debut in the film Wild Orchid opposite future husband Mickey Rourke. Stills from the film's climactic sex scene were sold to Playboy, and were the subject of a lawsuit filed by Otis. Otis would later appear in another Rourke film, Exit in Red.

=== Later modeling ===
After the end of her marriage to Rourke, Otis gradually resumed modeling. In 2000, she became one of the oldest models to appear in the Sports Illustrated swimsuit issue, although Christie Brinkley at 34 and Cheryl Tiegs at 42 were featured prominently in the 25th Anniversary edition of Sports Illustrated, released in 1989. Shortly thereafter, Otis began recovering from anorexia nervosa. As part of her recovery, she experienced a weight gain that offered her the opportunity to work as a plus-size model, most notably as the face for Marina Rinaldi and editorials for Mode Magazine; in 2003, Otis became a spokesperson for National Eating Disorders Awareness Week. She also appeared periodically as a correspondent on Channel 4 News in San Francisco.

In August 2003, Otis posed for a PETA ad campaign promoting vegetarianism and animal rights.

In 2005, she represented the Breil jewelry line.

She is on the advisory board of the Model Alliance and an ambassador for the National Eating Disorders Association.

== Works ==
Beauty, Disrupted: A Memoir (2011) is an autobiographical book by Otis and Hugo Schwyzer.

Otis tells the story of her life and modelling career. She details abuses she suffered, including being raped "countless" times as a 17 year old by Gérald Marie, the head of Elite Model Management's Paris office. During her marriage to actor Mickey Rourke, she claims he was abusive, and even threatened to kill himself if she didn't marry him.

== Personal life ==
Otis developed three holes in her heart during her modeling career. Otis is a vegetarian.

From June 1992 to December 1998, Otis was married to Wild Orchid co-star Mickey Rourke. In 1994, Rourke was arrested for spousal abuse. The charges were later dropped.

In 2005, Otis married chemical engineer Matthew Sutton, they have two children.
