= Commonwealth of World Citizens =

Self-described servant-Nation

Mondcivitania Mondcivitan Republic
- Flag
- Administrative center: London

Leaders
  - Founder: Hugh J. Schonfield
- Establishment: 1956

The Commonwealth of World Citizens, later named the Mondcivitan Republic (or Mondcivitania) in Esperanto, was founded by Hugh J. Schonfield, an associate of H.G. Wells, in 1956. The organisation describes itself as a servant-Nation.

== Objectives ==
Hugh Schonfield was a biblical scholar, who was later best known for his book The Passover Plot. Schonfield first felt the need for an organisation for the service of all nations as far back as 1938.

From 1938 to 1950 Schonfield examined various aspects of the project, including questions of international law. Schonfield came up with the idea of a body of persons from different countries which would have relations with the governments of other countries, without that organisation holding any territory itself. When the United Nations was formed, Schonfield wrote to the Secretary-General and to all the states party to the charter of his desire to form his Mondcivitan Republic.

In the summer of 1951, a General Assembly of the organisation's members was held in Paris, which appointed a Secretariat as the acting administration with offices in London. By 1952 the organisation had members in 14 countries, by 1954 in 25 countries and by 1955 in 30 countries. The second General Assembly in 1953 set up a commission to draft the text of the constitution of the organisation. Following amendments at the third General Assembly in 1955, the organisation's provisional Constitution was approved for adoption. In the same year humanitarian activities were initiated by the creation of the World Service Trust as a specialised agency of the organisation.

Caresse Crosby merged her group with the Commonwealth of World Citizens.

=== Ideals ===
The organisation arose from the need felt by members throughout the world to give organic expression to the idea of the fundamental unity of the human race by developing a common way of life and government, which experimentally would be a preparation by example for a co-operative World community embracing all peoples.

The organisation was to consist of all its members at any given time, without regard for colour or ethnic origin. In its political expression it was a free and self-governing organisation and world community.

The new organisation expressed the goal of world unity and human fraternity. The idea was that the organisation should advocate for international reconciliation and the resolution of international problems and conflicts. The loyalty it demanded was higher than that given to any state, requiring in the individual full dedication to the principles and purposes of the new nation, yet at the initial stage without forfeiting state citizenship.

For the members, state citizenship was to be always secondary to membership within the organisation. Any member was expected to be primarily concerned with the affairs and policies of the organisation. Taking part in war, aggression or oppression was strictly prohibited and the member was supposed to be prepared to suffer the penalties. All members were expected to live and abide by a set of seven principles:

- No-one is an Enemy
- No-one is a Foreigner
- Service to All
- Complete Impartiality
- Work for Peace
- True Democracy
- Equity and Justice

== The Republic ==
With members in 33 countries it was decided in 1956 that the Mondcivitan Republic should be proclaimed in being de facto and that all governments should be advised accordingly and furnished with a copy of the constitution. A Constituent Assembly of the organisation's members was convened at the Temple of Peace, Cardiff, headquarters of the United Nations Association in Wales. The organisation's constitution was adopted on August 29 and the flag of the organisation hoisted over the building. A council was elected to prepare the way for parliamentary government.

In 1958 a democratic election was held giving opportunity to all members in the countries where they resided to elect deputies to the first parliament which met in Vienna in May 1959. Up to this time the organisation had used the title, "Commonwealth of World Citizens" which was abandoned in favour of "The Mondcivitan Republic". Hugh Schonfield, the pioneer of the enterprise, was elected acting president and the organisation chose an executive committee headed by a young member, Donald Hanby who was referred to as the prime minister.

In 1963, the organisation held its second parliament. The term of this body was to be for five years. In accordance with the constitution, a presidium of five was elected under the name of the Supreme Council, each member of which would hold the office of president for one year in turn. Those elected, in the order of their presidency, were Frieda Bacon, Justo Priesto, Nguyen-Huu, Anthony Brooke and Hugh J. Schonfield, the last named to take office at the end of August 1967. The post of prime minister was relinquished and replaced under the constitution with that of commissioner-general and Donald Hanby was elected to that office.

At this time, the International Arbitration League, founded at the beginning of the 20th century by the Nobel Peace Prize winner, Sir William Randal Cremer, decided that its work could best be continued by the Mondcivitan Republic and the two organisations fused. The work of the World Service Trust continued and a housing agency, the Cremer Housing Association, was formed, which later provided new premises for use by the organisation.

In 1971, the provisional constitution was suspended to make way for formulating a full constitution. To enable the organisation to ensure the best means of governance, an executive council was appointed to take full responsibility for the organisation's affairs in the interim period. It was hoped that a full constitution and self-government could be achieved by 1975, but this did not happen.

== Projects ==
In 1972 Hugh Schonfield's book about the fundamental ideas behind the organisation, The Politics of God, was published and received much interest, particularly because it had been preceded by the best-selling The Passover Plot, which had created much discussion and aroused interest in the concept of Messianism.

The Community school project was started as an experiment by the organisation's membership. It was intended to provide a viable alternative to the prevalent educational concepts, with primary aim to give each child freedom, experience, resources and love. It was believed that this should take place in, and be directly concerned with, the community as a whole, encouraging children to take an active interest in serving and changing the community for the betterment of the whole of mankind. Various methods of achieving these aims were implemented. The school was supported by donations from members and charged no fees. Many of the children were "problem" children from the neighbourhood of the school who went on to lead productive lives.

== The World Service Trust ==
The World Service Trust was founded in 1955 as a special agency of the organisation for the purpose of giving impartial aid to people and countries in circumstances of poverty, famine, disease and epidemics, as well as natural disasters. The secondary organisation was also designed to assist education and improve standards of living.

In 1990 the secondary organisation became a foundation and was renamed "The Hugh and Helene Schonfield World Service Trust". The Schonfields contributed to it financially.

The organisation fell into decline following the 1980s. Its archives are now deposited with the Bishopsgate Institute in London. Its activities became more centred in Germany as the community initiated by Wilhelm Haller felt a more decentralised and less bureaucratic approach was necessary. A new initiative was started in 2004 with the founding of the 'International Leadership and Business Society', intended to encourage the application of the original Mondcivitan principles in business and everyday life. The Hugh & Helene Schonfield World Service Trust continued to work particularly with its responsibility for the archiving and publicising of the work of the late Hugh J. Schonfield and research into the concepts of Messianism, Humanitism and Servant-Nationhood and methods to find their practical realisation.

In 2014 a revival of the movement was started in an attempt to find a current interpretation. This led to the establishment of a Facebook page.

== See also ==
- Micronation
- World Service Authority
- World Passport
- World Constitution and Parliament Association (WCPA)
