= Gérald Marie =

French modeling agency boss

- Born: Gérald Marie de Castellac; 1950
- Occupation: Modeling agency executive
- Known for: President of Elite Model Management (Europe)
- Notable work: Elite Model Look (expanded the competition in Europe)
- Spouse: Linda Evangelista (m. 1987; div. 1993)

Gérald Marie is a French former model agency boss, who headed Elite Model Management in Paris and was among the most powerful figures in the fashion industry. He was accused by several women of committing rape and sexual assault during the 1980s and 1990s. He denied the allegations and prosecutors closed the investigation in February 2023 due to the statute of limitations. Marie resigned from Elite in 1999. On the same day as his resignation, Elite's chairman, John Casablancas, issued an "unconditional apology" to models and their families for the "shocking, unacceptable and totally incorrect" behavior of some agency executives.

He was the president of Elite Model Management European division.

== Sexual assault and harassment allegations ==
In February 2021, 11 women who accused Marie of sexual misconduct and rape were invited to Paris to meet investigators. Karen Mulder, a supermodel in the 1990s, said in a television interview that she spent five months in a mental health facility because she was raped by him multiple times.

In July 2021, American model Carré Otis filed a complaint against him for allegedly raping her when she was 17. In August 2021, Otis filed a lawsuit alleging that he repeatedly raped her at his Paris apartment. At least 15 women have gone to French authorities with sexual assault allegations against him.

His wife between 1987 and 1993, Canadian supermodel Linda Evangelista, said she knew nothing about the reported alleged rapes and sexual assaults that would have occurred during her relationship with him. However, she stated that she believes the women who have come forward are telling the truth, and praised their courage. Discussing their relationship in the 2023 documentary The Super Models, Evangelista said: "I learned that maybe I was in the wrong relationship. It's easier said than done to leave an abusive relationship. I understand that concept, because I lived it. If it was just a matter of saying, 'I want a divorce, see ya'... it doesn't work that way. He knew not to touch my face, not to touch the money-maker, you know?"

On 13 February 2023, French prosecutors closed criminal investigation into the rape and sexual assaults, allegedly committed by Marie during the 1980s and 1990s, on the grounds that under France's statute of limitations, the alleged offences had taken place too long ago to be prosecuted.

The decision to drop the criminal investigations did not prevent alleged victims from pursuing claims against Marie through the civil courts. Former BBC journalist Lisa Brinkworth is among the alleged victims who said they would progress civil cases against Gérald Marie. Brinkworth claims she was sexually assaulted in a Milan nightclub by Marie in 1998, while she was working undercover on a documentary investigation into sex crimes against fashion models.

On June 5, 2026, Carré Otis lodged a fresh complaint in Paris accusing Marie of the rape of a minor, committed when she was 17, and of human trafficking. On July 15, 2026, six further women, most of them American nationals, filed complaints alleging rape and human trafficking in the 1980s and 1990s. The complaints were lodged with civil party status before the senior investigating judge at the Paris Judicial Court. Their lawyer, Mathias Darmon, said that two of the six were coming forward for the first time, and that one had been a minor at the time of the alleged offences. Marie's lawyer, Céline Bekerman, said that he "categorically denies these allegations, today as he did yesterday", that they had already been examined in a thorough investigation by the Paris public prosecutor's office, and that there was "no reason to mobilise the justice system again to revisit, nearly 40 years after the alleged events, a case that is both time-barred and closed".

== Personal life ==
He was married to Canadian supermodel Linda Evangelista between 1987 and 1993.
