= Spooner (1989 film) =

- VHS cover
- Directed by: George Miller
- Written by: Peter I. Baloff; Dave Wollert
- Produced by: Sheldon Pinchuk
- Starring: Robert Urich; Jane Kaczmarek
- Cinematography: Tim Suhrstedt
- Edited by: Jim Gross
- Music by: Brian Banks; Anthony Marinelli
- Production company: Disney
- Release date: 1989
- Running time: 98 minutes
- Country: USA
- Language: English

Spooner is a 1989 American television film. It first aired on The Disney Channel on 2 December 1989.

== Synopsis ==
A convicted forger escapes prison and takes a job as a high schools teacher and coach.

== Cast ==
- Robert Urich as Harry Spooner / Michael Norlon
- Jane Kaczmarek as Gail Archer
- Paul Gleason as Roland Bishop
- Keith Coogan as D B Reynolds
- Barry Corbin as Principal Bennet
- Eric Christmas as Mr. Settles
- Rick Lenz as Sheriff Reynolds
- John Wesley as U.S. Marshal Ed Wilson
- Brent Fraser as Shane
- Katie Barberi as Caroline
- Robert King as Coach Miliken

== Reception ==
Knight-Ridder Newspapers' Ron Miller said "This is a wonderful picture with a witty teleplay and a rousing finish. What's more. It has a lot to say about facing responsibility and a winning performance by Urich as a man who finally learns a bigger lesson than any of his students."
