= The Passover Plot =

Conspiratorial book published in 1965 regarding the life of Jesus Christ

- First edition
- Author: Hugh J. Schonfield
- Language: English
- Genre: Non-fiction
- Publisher: Hutchinson
- Publication date: 1965
- Publication place: United Kingdom

The Passover Plot is a 1965 book by British biblical scholar Hugh J. Schonfield, who also published a translation of the New Testament from a Jewish perspective. The book was adapted into a film, The Passover Plot (1976).

== Schonfield's conclusions ==
Based on his research into the social and religious culture in which Jesus was born, lived and died, and into other literature, including the source documents of the Gospels, Schonfield reached the following conclusions:

- That Jesus was a deeply religious Jewish man, probably well-versed in the teachings of the local northern sects such as the Nazarenes and Essenes.
- That growing up in biblical Galilee he had a skeptical and somewhat rebellious relationship to the hierarchy and teachings mandated by the authorities (the Saducees) of the Temple in Jerusalem.
- That Jewish Messianic expectation was extremely high in those times, matched to the despair caused by the Roman occupation of the land and subjugation of the Jews.
- That he was in many ways both typical of his times, and yet extraordinary in his religious convictions and beliefs, in his scholarship of the biblical literature, and in the fervency in which he lived his religion out in his daily life.
- That he was convinced of his role as the expected Messiah based on the authority of his having been descended from King David (the royal bloodline of David), and that he consciously and methodically, to the point of being calculating, attempted to fulfill that role, being eminently well-versed in the details of what that role entailed.
- That he was convinced of the importance of his fulfilling the role perfectly (after all prophesy and expectation), and that he could not allow himself to fail, as that would undoubtedly lead to his being declared a false Messiah.
- That he was perfectly aware of the consequences of his actions all along the way, and that he directed his closest supporters, the original twelve Apostles, unknowingly to aid him in his plans.
- That he involved the smallest possible number of supporters in his plans ("need to know" basis) and gave them only the smallest amount of information necessary.

The culmination of his plan was to be his death (the crucifixion), his resurrection and his reign as the true kingly and priestly messiah, not in heaven but on earth—the realized king of the Jews.

== Planning ==
Schonfield argues that the Gospel of John properly recounts the Passover events, which are inconsistently described in all the other Gospels. His reading of that Gospel convinced him that John's account, though probably filtered through an assistant and transcription in John's old age, suggests that Jesus had planned everything. Among other things, that he would not be on the cross for more than a few hours before the Sabbath arrived, when it was required by law that crucified Jews be taken down; that one of his supporters, who was on hand, would give him water (to quench his thirst) that was actually laced with a drug to make him unconscious; and that Joseph of Arimathea, a well-connected supporter, would collect him off the cross while still alive (but appearing dead) so that he could be secretly nursed back to health.

Schonfield suggests that the plan went awry because of a soldier's actions with a spear. Schonfield gives evidence of a high-ranking member of the Sanhedrin who was one of Jesus' followers, likely the Beloved Disciple who is otherwise obscure, and notes several instances in which knowledge of or access to the Temple was available to one or more of Jesus' followers. He identifies this follower as John, the source of the Gospel many decades later whilst living in Asia Minor. He suggests that this Apostle, and Joseph of Arimathea, were responsible for events following the Crucifixion, and that it might have been this Apostle (an 'undercover Disciple', as it were) who was seen (by those who did not know him) at the Tomb on the morning of the Resurrection.

== Second half of the book ==
After first laying out the storyline and outcome of Jesus' life in the first half of the book, along with supportive arguments, Schonfield devotes the second half of the book to a more detailed explanation of the concepts and arguments used to support his conclusions. Schonfield also discusses how Jesus' original message and purpose may have become transformed during the century after his death.

== Film based on book ==
The Passover Plot is the name of a 1976 film which was adapted from the book. The film stars Zalman King as Yeshua (Jesus), and the cast includes Harry Andrews, Dan Hedaya, and Donald Pleasence. It was directed by Michael Campus and nominated for an Oscar for Best Costume Design. Schonfield also featured in the dramatised documentary television series, Jesus: The Evidence (1984: LWT for Channel 4).

== See also ==
- Jesuism
- Swoon hypothesis
