= Elite Model Management =

Modeling agency

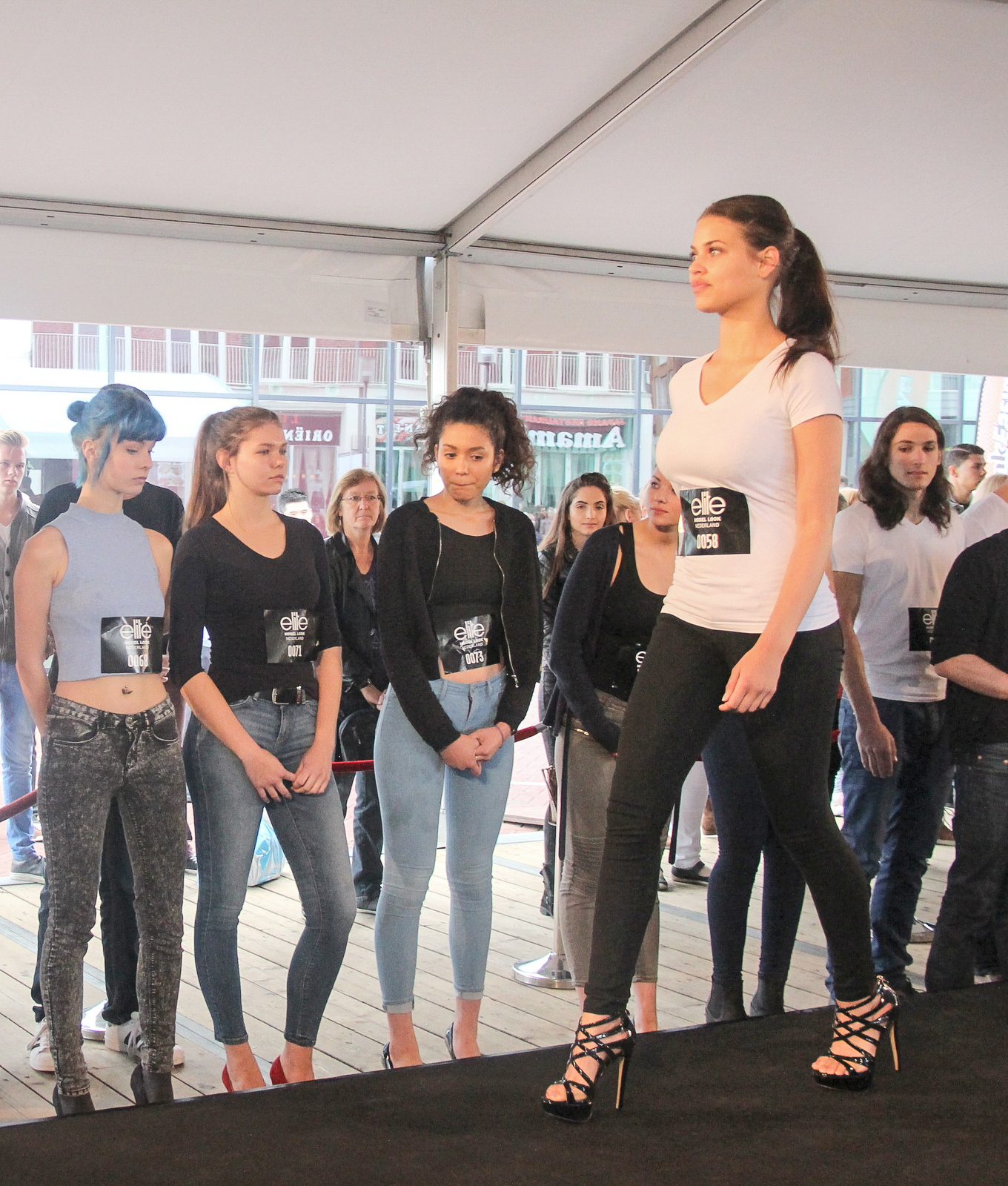
- Models at Elite event in Spijkenisse in 2015
- Type: Private modeling agency
- Industry: Fashion
- Founded: 1972 (54 years ago)
- Founders: John Casablancas; Alain Kittler
- Headquarters: Paris, France
- Area served: Worldwide
- Key people: Silvio Scaglia; Paolo Barbieri
- Parent: Elite Model World; Elite World SA; Elite World Group
- Website: elitemodel.com

Elite Model Management (MM) is a French modeling agency that originated in Paris in 1972. Elite MM is a subsidiary of Elite World S.A., whose main shareholder Silvio Scaglia controls his stake through Elite World Group (EWG), a management company where Elite MM is one of brands along with The Society Management, Women Management, Supreme Management, Elite Model Look, and Women 360. In 2004, the agencies in New York City, Miami, Los Angeles, and Toronto separated and formed Elite Model Management North America. Although Elite Model Management North America and Elite World Group share the same logo, they have separate ownership and are not part of a business network.

== History ==
=== Founding ===
Elite Model Management was founded in Paris in 1972 by John Casablancas (1942–2013) and Alain Kittler. Casablancas was inspired by his then-wife Jeanette Christiansen, former model and Miss Universe from Denmark, to open a model agency. Casablancas founded the model agency with his savings. Elite Model opened with several high-profile models including Ingmari Lamy; Ann Schaufuss, Clive Arrowsmith's girlfriend; Barry Lategan's wife, Lynn Kohlman; Paula Brenken; and Paris Plannings Emanuelle Dano.

At the time, boutique agencies in Paris and Milan fell out of favor with models due to payment issues. Models often found that Parisian and Milanese agencies were withholding their pay to coerce them into returning without work visas and work. British and American-based chains gave models the financial security they needed.

=== New York expansion and model wars ===
In 1977, Casablancas opened up Elite Models in New York. During the 1980s, New York endured the model wars. Despite agencies like Wilhelmina Models taking part in these wars, the primary battle was between Elite Models and Ford Models. Until 1977, Ford was affiliated with Elite until Elite opened up offices in New York and began stealing Ford's models. Models such as Esmé Marshall left Elite for Ford Models. Casablancas alleged that Eileen Ford was out to get him, and Ford responded with a $32.5 million suit. Due to the death of Wilhelmina Cooper, models were in a panic, bouncing from agency to agency. Even the highest-paid Black model at the time, Beverly Johnson, left Elite for Ford, only to return to Elite a week later. Models such as Christie Brinkley and Anna Andersen sued Elite after they exited.

=== 1980s expansion ===
In 1981, Elite Models formed a partnership with Models 1, which lasted until 1989. By 1983, Elite established the Elite Model Look, known as The Look of the Year, a competition to rival its competitor Ford's Supermodel of the World contest. The following year, the company expanded its offices in the U.S. with the formation of Elite Models Chicago, Elite Models Atlanta, Elite Models Los Angeles, Elite Models San Francisco, and Elite Models Miami. By 1986, Elite Models had twenty offices worldwide. In 1988, Elite opened offices in Milan.

=== 1990s partnerships and expansion ===
Nicholas Farrae later purchased the agency in 1990. Elite World S.A. is the parent company of Elite Model Management (MM). The expansion of Elite Models continued as it formed partnerships with already established agencies. In 1990, Elite Models formed a partnership with Model Management Heidi Gross in Hamburg. In 1992, Munich Models was formed and formed a partnership with Elite MM. In 1994, Elite MM sought to break into the Asian market and awarded its Greater China rights to Michel Lu. In collaboration with him, they established Elite Models Hong Kong and China. In 1996, Lu expanded Elite MM to Singapore, which served as a regional office for South East Asia. Similar to their debut in Paris, Elite swept up top local and regional talents such as Charmaine Harn, Junita Simon, Sonia Couling, and Nadya Hatagalung.

In 1999, a film was broadcast by the BBC showing the President of Elite MM, Gérald Marie, offering an undercover reporter sex for money. It was later proven that some images had been manipulated and the BBC admitted that its portrayal was unfair and had to make a substantial payout to the model agency. In the wake of this controversy, Casablancas left and formed the John Casablancas Modeling and Career Center in New York. Elite World SA was incorporated on 14 December 1999 as an umbrella company and for licensing.

=== 2000s restructuring ===
In 2002, Elite MM, along with several other New York City model agencies, was sued for hundreds of millions of dollars in a class action that accused them of fixing fees for the past 30 years. The following year, Elite opened offices in Asia. At the same time, an employee was awarded $5.2 million in a suit concerning passive smoking in the US office of Elite. As a result of the bad publicity, the over expansion of Elite, and the loss of talents, Elite World SA filed for Chapter 11 bankruptcy in 2004. Elite Models New York City was put up for auction and bought by Florida businessman Eddie Trump for $4.4 million, who asked Casablancas to come back and advise him. Elite Models NY together with Los Angeles, Miami, and Toronto became Elite MM North America separate from Elite World SA.

In August 2005, Elite World SA reestablished Elite MM in Singapore using it as the satellite office for their new South East Asia operation. Elite Models branches in Indonesia, Malaysia, Thailand, and Philippines were also added in August 2005. In October 2005, the Elite Model Look contest was added in Singapore. By 2006, Casablancas' appointment was short-lived and Elite World SA went public on the Frankfurt Stock Exchange.

In 2009, the president of Elite World SA (the parent company of Elite MM), Bertrand Hennet, was arrested on drug charges. At the same time, acquired Elite Models Copenhagen, which was founded in 1966 under the name Copenhagen Models by legendary scout Trice Tomsen and formally a licensee of Elite Models (now Elite Models Management Copenhagen ApS controlled together with its licenses by Elite Licensing Company SA owned by Elite World SA). After Tomsen decided to distance herself from the day-to-day work, she was replaced by Munir Bouylud as the new director there. Also in 2009, Elite Models London opened nearly 20 years after its first attempt to have offices in London. It was also in 2009 that Elite Models Chicago and Atlanta severed ties with Elite World SA and were renamed Factor Women.

=== 2010s and current ownership ===
In February 2011, Elite World SA shareholders elected a new board of directors. The new board election follows the acquisition of a controlling stake in Elite World SA by Pacific Global Management, SARL (PGM) (now Freedom Holding, Inc.). In 2012, Elite Models Amsterdam acquired Model Masters in Amsterdam. Model Masters is best known for representing models who win Holland's Next Top Model. With that acquisition, Elite fired Ananda Marchildon for being "too fat". The company lost a breach of contract lawsuit by Ananda Marchildon and had to pay her around €65,000 in damages.

In 2013, Elite World SA opened a New York division under the name The Society Management (The Society, The Society Model Management, Inc.). Elite World Group, LLC (EWG) was created in order to hold PGM's stake in Elite World SA and EWG's branch was incorporated in New York on 28 January 2019. In 2019, Julia Haart was announced chief executive officer and chief creative officer of EWG which oversees Elite MM. In 2022, Paolo Barbieri was announced group chief executive officer of Elite World Group which oversees Elite MM, The Society Management and Women Management.

== Sexual misconduct allegations ==
Allegations of an "ingrained culture" of sexual assault and rape by Elite's male employees, especially its boss Gérald Marie, have dogged the agency for decades. In 1999, a BBC investigation filmed Marie saying he hoped to seduce the contestants at the annual Elite Model Look show, as well as assaulting an undercover journalist and offering her money for sex. He was temporarily suspended from Elite and, in an interview at the time, said: "I'm destroyed ... I'm finished". But Elite countered with a libel action, which was quietly settled with an apology from the BBC, which also agreed not to rebroadcast their documentary.

Marie was married to Linda Evangelista between 1987 and 1993, at the time of many of the alleged offences; Marie is alleged to have raped several aspiring models in their flat while Evangelista was away on assignment, including a 15-year-old girl. Supermodel and actress Carré Otis claimed in her 2011 memoir, Beauty, Disrupted, that she was raped "countless" times in the flat by Marie starting around 1986, when she was 17. Otis and others have also claimed that rape by ancillary employees, such as hairdressers, drivers and photographers, was commonplace. In October 2020, Evangelista said: "During my relationship with Gérald Marie, I knew nothing of these sexual allegations against him, so I was unable to help these women. Hearing them now, and based on my own experiences, I believe that they are telling the truth. It breaks my heart because these are wounds that may never heal, and I admire their courage and strength for speaking up today."

Elite's activities are also alleged to have been regularly used as a "front" for "pimping out" young models to wealthy men unconnected to the modelling industry. Adnan Khashoggi, the Saudi billionaire arms dealer, is said to have admitted to at least one such introduction, to a model who became one of his "harem wives". One woman said that in the early 1980s he routinely browsed photographic portfolios of young women, with his assistant "asking whom he would like to meet, and discussing meet-up fees of between $35,000 and $50,000."

In the wake of the MeToo movement, the allegations increased; as of November 2020, at least 15 women had spoken out against Marie and were cooperating in an investigation launched by French prosecutors. Marie has denied all the allegations via his lawyers and said he intends to fight any charges laid against him. Despite this, more publications are claiming his alleged sexual misconduct was an open secret for years in the fashion industry.

In 2004, Elite was forced into bankruptcy following years of financial mismanagement, and split into two separate agencies, owned by different corporate entities; both were still in operation as of 2020. According to The Guardian, Marie "is believed to have continued working with the New York division of Elite, Creative World Management, until as recently as 2011". A spokesperson for Elite World Group told The Guardian "Gérald Marie's contract with Elite Model Management ended in December 2010, and the company was sold in 2011 to its current owners Elite World Group, for whom Marie has never worked."

== See also ==
- List of modeling agencies
- John Casablancas
- Gérald Marie
- Stephanie Seymour
- Linda Evangelista
