= Rumah Nyumbang =

- Location within Borneo
- Coordinates: 1.81667°N 111.63333°E
- Country: Malaysia
- State: Sarawak
- Administrative Division: Kanowit
- Elevation: 108 m (354 ft)

Rumah Nyumbang (also known as Rumah Peng Ngumbang) is a settlement in the Kanowit division of Sarawak, Malaysia. It lies approximately 146.9 kilometres (91 mi) east of the state capital Kuching.

Neighbouring settlements include:

- Rumah Nyawai 0 kilometres (0.0 mi) north
- Rumah Galau 1.9 kilometres (1.2 mi) east
- Wuak 2.6 kilometres (1.6 mi) northwest
- Rumah Dundang 3.7 kilometres (2.3 mi) south
- Rumah Sait 4.1 kilometres (2.5 mi) northwest
- Rumah Asun 4.1 kilometres (2.5 mi) northeast
- Rumah Jambai 4.1 kilometres (2.5 mi) northwest
- Rumah Tumal 4.1 kilometres (2.5 mi) northwest
- Rumah Jimban 4.1 kilometres (2.5 mi) southeast
- Rumah Jilan 5.2 kilometres (3.2 mi) southwest
