= Patricia Louisianna Knop =

American screenwriter (1940–2019)

- Patricia L. Knop, from the 1958 yearbook of Muskegon High School
- Born: October 23, 1940; Muskegon, Michigan, U.S.
- Died: August 7, 2019 (aged 78); Santa Monica, California, U.S.
- Occupation: Screenwriter
- Spouse: Zalman King (m. 1965; died 2012)
- Children: 2 daughters

Patricia Louisianna Knop (October 23, 1940 – August 7, 2019) was an American screenwriter, television producer, art collector, and sculptor.

== Early life and education ==
Knop was born in Muskegon, Michigan, the daughter of Albert Ernest Knop and Alice Lillian Keat Knop. Her father worked in a refrigerator factory. She graduated from Muskegon High School in 1958.

== Career ==
Knop met her husband in the Bahamas in the 1960s. They opened several coffee shops in New York, New Jersey, and Iowa, before getting into show business. She was credited as a writer on the films The Passover Plot (1976), Lady Oscar (1979), Silence of the North (1981), 9½ Weeks (1986), Siesta (1987), Wild Orchid (1989), and Delta of Venus (1995). She was also a producer on the television series Red Shoe Diaries (1992 to 1996). In theatre, Knop co-wrote the book for the musical Whistle Down the Wind (1996) with Andrew Lloyd Webber and Gale Edwards.

Sculptures created by Knop appeared in the film Some Call it Loving (1973). Knop was an adventurous art collector; she and Zalman King filled their Santa Monica home with contemporary paintings and sculptures, antiques, salvaged items, and stained glass.

== Personal life ==
Knop married film director Zalman King in 1965; they had two daughters, Gillian and Chloe. Her husband died in 2012, and she died in 2019, at the age of 78, in Santa Monica.
