= Ingeborg Day =

Austrian-American novelist (1940–2011)

- Born: Ingeborg Seiler; November 6, 1940; Graz, Austria
- Died: May 18, 2011 (aged 70); Ashland, Oregon, United States
- Education: Goshen College
- Occupation: Author
- Spouse(s): Dennis Day (before 1963 – before 1978) Donald Sweet (m. 1991)
- Children: 2
- Writing career
- Pen name: Elizabeth McNeill
- Genre: Fiction
- Notable work: 9½ Weeks

Ingeborg Day (née Seiler; November 6, 1940 – May 18, 2011) was an Austrian–American author who wrote the semi-autobiographical erotic novel Nine and a Half Weeks which she published under the pseudonym Elizabeth McNeill and which was made into the 1986 film of the same name starring Kim Basinger and Mickey Rourke.

== Life ==
Day was born in Graz, Austria, in November 1940. Her father, Ernst Seiler, was a member of the Nazi SS organization. She spent the last two years of the war on her grandmother's farm.

In 1957, as a high school student, she participated in the AFS exchange program, living with an American family for one year and attending Eastwood High School in Syracuse, New York. She met and married a trainee priest named Dennis Day, and they moved to Indiana, where she attained a B.A. in German studies from Goshen College, and spent several years teaching in Kenosha, Wisconsin. They had a daughter, Ursula, in 1963, and a son, Mark, who died at the age of seven.

Day left her husband and moved to Manhattan with artist Tom Shannon and became an editor at Ms magazine. It was during this time that the affair portrayed in 9½ Weeks happened. In 1978, she published the novel 9½ Weeks under the pseudonym Elizabeth McNeill. In 1980, she published her memoir Ghost Waltz.

In 1991, she married Donald Sweet, a man 14 years her senior. They moved to Ashland, Oregon, shortly after the wedding.

She died by suicide on May 18, 2011, aged 70, after several years of illness. Her husband died four days later.

== Books ==
- Nine and a Half Weeks: A Memoir of a Love Affair (1978, E. P. Dutton)
- Ghost Waltz: A Memoir (1980, Viking Press)
