= Rumah Sait =

- Location within Borneo
- Coordinates: 2.03078°N 112.39499°E
- Country: Malaysia
- State: Sarawak
- Administrative Division: Kanowit
- Elevation: 72 m (236 ft)

Rumah Sait is a settlement in the Kanowit division of Sarawak, Malaysia. It lies approximately 143.6 kilometres (89 mi) east of the state capital Kuching.

Neighbouring settlements include:

- Rumah Jambai 2.6 kilometres (1.6 mi) northeast
- Rumah Tumal 2.6 kilometres (1.6 mi) northeast
- Rumah Rii 3.7 kilometres (2.3 mi) north
- Rumah Buyong 4.1 kilometres (2.5 mi) southwest
- Rumah Penghulu Gara 4.1 kilometres (2.5 mi) southwest
- Rumah Nyumbang 4.1 kilometres (2.5 mi) southeast
- Rumah Nyawai 4.1 kilometres (2.5 mi) southeast
- Rumah Penghulu Linau 5.2 kilometres (3.2 mi) northeast
- Rumah Jilan 5.6 kilometres (3.5 mi) south
