= 9½ Weeks =

1986 film by Adrian Lyne

- Theatrical release poster
- Directed by: Adrian Lyne
- Screenplay by: Patricia Knop; Zalman King; Sarah Kernochan
- Based on: Nine and a Half Weeks by Elizabeth McNeill
- Produced by: Antony Rufus-Isaacs; Zalman King
- Starring: Mickey Rourke; Kim Basinger
- Cinematography: Peter Biziou
- Edited by: Caroline Biggerstaff; Tom Rolf
- Music by: Jack Nitzsche
- Production companies: Galactic Films; Jonesfilm; Producers Sales Organization; Triple Ajaxxx
- Distributed by: MGM/UA Entertainment Co. (United States); PSO International (international)
- Release date: February 21, 1986
- Running time: 116 minutes
- Country: United States
- Languages: English; Spanish
- Budget: $17 million
- Box office: $100 million

9½ Weeks is a 1986 American erotic romantic drama film directed by Adrian Lyne, and starring Mickey Rourke and Kim Basinger. The film follows New York City art gallery employee Elizabeth McGraw (Basinger) who has a brief yet intense affair with mysterious Wall Street broker John Gray (Rourke). The screenplay by Patricia Knop, Zalman King and Sarah Kernochan is adapted from the 1978 memoir Nine and a Half Weeks by Austrian-American author Ingeborg Day, under the pseudonym "Elizabeth McNeill".

Principal photography was completed in August 1984, but the film was not released until February 1986. Considered too explicit by its American distributor Metro-Goldwyn-Mayer, 9½ Weeks was heavily edited for release in the United States, where it was a box-office bomb, grossing $6.7 million on a $17 million budget. It also received mixed reviews at the time of its release. However, its soundtrack sold well and the film itself became a huge success internationally in its unedited version, particularly in Australia, Canada, France, Germany and the United Kingdom, grossing $100 million worldwide. It has also acquired a large fanbase on video and DVD and has developed a cult following.

== Plot ==
Elizabeth McGraw, a young employee at a SoHo art gallery, meets John Gray, a Wall Street arbitrageur, at a Chinese grocer, and later at a flea market where he buys her an expensive shawl. They start dating, but John's strange behavior escalates, and he gives her an expensive gold watch with instructions to think about him touching her at noon every day. Elizabeth masturbates at work at the designated time.

Elizabeth wants to introduce John to her friends, but he only wants to see her in the evenings and tells her to see her friends during the day. One evening, she is alone in his apartment and finds a photo of him with another woman. When John calls and asks if she went through his things, she admits it. He threatens to punish her, and returning home, he orders her to face the wall for a spanking. Elizabeth tries to leave, but the door is locked. John slaps her, she slaps him back and hits him repeatedly, and he has aggressive sex with her. Despite this, Elizabeth falls in love with John and starts to enjoy his dominant behavior.

John takes control of all aspects of Elizabeth's life, from what she wears and eats to how he brushes her hair and feeds her. Elizabeth becomes increasingly dependent on John, losing her sense of self. One day, she follows John to work and brings him lunch, telling him she wants to be "one of the guys". John arranges for her to cross-dress for a rendezvous at a bar at the Algonquin Hotel, but after they leave, they are mistaken for a gay couple and attacked by a group of thugs in an alley. Elizabeth stabs one of the attackers in the buttocks, and they flee. Aroused by the incident, Elizabeth declares her love for John, takes off her dinner suit and has sex with him under a leaking drainpipe.

John starts to make their BDSM-style relationship more apparent in public. He dares her to shoplift a necklace, and she does so. At the bedding section in Bloomingdale's, he asks Elizabeth to "spread your legs for daddy" in front of the saleswoman. At an equestrian store, he whips Elizabeth on the leg with a riding crop, which he buys. Later that evening, Elizabeth performs a striptease with the crop at John's apartment.

One day, John asks Elizabeth to crawl and pick up money as he throws it on the floor of his apartment. Elizabeth initially obliges but then objects, and John threatens to hit her with his belt. Elizabeth cries and protests, but John continues to insist that she crawl and pick up the money. She eventually does so before throwing the money in John's face and declaring that she hates the game. Elizabeth feels confident at home with John, but she becomes withdrawn at work and thinks about her ex-husband Bruce, who starts dating her co-worker and roommate Molly. She goes to the countryside to visit an elderly artist named Matthew Farnsworth and secure an exhibit.

Elizabeth meets John at a room at the Hotel Chelsea and is asked to wear a blindfold. John touches her briefly before a South American prostitute enters the room and caresses Elizabeth as John observes. Elizabeth becomes nervous, and the prostitute removes her blindfold. When John takes the prostitute to the next room and starts undressing her, Elizabeth hits him and flees. John follows her to an adult entertainment venue where Elizabeth starts kissing the man next to her during a live sex show. John approaches her, and they embrace.

Elizabeth's gallery hosts a successful opening featuring Farnsworth's work. Farnsworth, uncomfortable with the partying crowd, finds Elizabeth in tears in a corner. She spends the night with John, but the next morning, she prepares to leave him. John tries to convince her to stay by telling her about his family and confessing his feelings, but Elizabeth responds that he knew their affair would end "when one of us said stop". As she leaves his apartment, John says he hopes she will return by the time he counts to 50. Elizabeth instead walks away through the crowded streets, crying.

== Cast ==
- Mickey Rourke as John Gray
- Kim Basinger as Elizabeth McGraw
- Margaret Whitton as Molly
- David Margulies as Harvey
- Christine Baranski as Thea
- Karen Young as Sue
- William DeAcutis as Ted
- Dwight Weist as Matthew Farnsworth
- Roderick Cook as Sinclair
- Victor Truro as gallery client
- Olek Krupa as Bruce
- Michael Margotta as Michael
- Julian Beck as dinner guest
- Dan Lauria as janitor

== Production ==
=== Development ===
Director Adrian Lyne wanted to film an adaptation of Ingeborg Day's 1978 novel Nine and a Half Weeks after reading it, but initially felt that it would be impossible to make a studio film about sadomasochism. He directed Flashdance (1983) in order to convince TriStar Pictures to greenlight the film. However, shortly before principal photography began, TriStar withdrew from production due to "creative differences" with Lyne, which Lyne alleges was due to pressure from its principal stakeholder The Coca-Cola Company over its content. Filming proceeded with funding from the Producers Sales Organization, and MGM/UA Entertainment Co. agreed to distribute the film in North America after its completion.

=== Casting ===
Kim Basinger said the audition was grueling; she was asked to act out a scene from the film wherein her character Elizabeth McGraw is made to crawl like a prostitute groveling for money in a sexual game devised by the male protagonist. Basinger said she left the audition crying and feeling humiliated. She told her agent that she never wanted to hear about the film again and would definitely not do it even if she were chosen. When she returned home, she found two dozen roses with a card from Lyne and Mickey Rourke. Lyne continued to pursue her for the part and eventually she changed her mind and decided to take it on. Lyne refused to conduct rehearsals for Basinger and Rourke so that the interactions between their characters would be their first time meeting in real life.

=== Filming ===
The film was shot between April 30, 1984, and August 10, 1984, on location in New York City with a $15 million budget. However, shooting fell two weeks behind schedule at the cost of an additional $500,000 due to constant fighting between Basinger, Rourke and Lyne. Rourke claimed the tensions between the three worked to the film's advantage by making his and Basinger's characters John Gray and Elizabeth's on-screen conflicts more convincing, and that Lyne even encouraged it. Lyne used monochromatic film, smoke machines, and grey sets and costumes to imitate the feel of a black-and-white film. He also chose locations around New York where he could film using natural light, including Trinity Church, the Canal Street Flea Market, the Algonquin Hotel, the Café des Artistes, Coney Island, Wall Street, Little Italy, SoHo, Bloomingdale's, Comme des Garçons, and the Chelsea Hotel. Lyne also tried to film at the New York Stock Exchange Building but was refused access due to the film's content.

=== Post-production ===
After negative test screenings in the United States and an X rating from the Motion Picture Association of America, MGM removed three minutes from the film's original North American theatrical release. The edits were intended to try to make the audience more sympathetic towards Elizabeth, to emphasize her consent in the affair, and to ensure an R rating. In particular, the scene in which John snaps his belt at Elizabeth and forces her to crawl around the room picking up cash was cut after causing two-thirds of the test audience to leave the theater. This scene was left intact in foreign markets and in later home video releases.

== Music ==
Originally Stewart Copeland was going to compose the film's score, but his involvement ended after Geffen Records deemed the script "offensive".

The main single released from 9½ Weeks: Original Motion Picture Soundtrack was "I Do What I Do", performed by Duran Duran bass guitarist John Taylor, giving his first solo singing performance during a hiatus in Duran Duran's career. The song reached number 23 on the Billboard Hot 100 and number 42 on the UK Singles Chart. Music for the score was composed by Taylor and Jonathan Elias. Original music for the movie was also written by Jack Nitzsche, but his compositions are not included on the soundtrack.

The soundtrack also included tracks from Luba, Bryan Ferry, Dalbello, Corey Hart, Joe Cocker ("You Can Leave Your Hat On"), Devo, Eurythmics and Stewart Copeland. Winston Grennan's reggae song "Savior" as well as Jean Michel Jarre's "Arpegiateur", played during the sex scene on the stairs in the rain, were not included on the record.

== Source material ==
The film was a significant departure from the much darker tone of the novel it is based upon. In Nine and a Half Weeks, John engages in criminal behavior and coerces Elizabeth into committing a violent mugging in an elevator. The book culminates in a quasi-rape scenario that leaves an increasingly permissive Elizabeth in mental anguish, and he takes her to a mental hospital–never to return to her again. The film ends on a somber tone, and there is no mention of the psychiatric breakdown that John inflicted upon her, though her mental anguish is frequently implied, especially near the end of the film.

== Release ==
=== Theatrical ===
The film's release in North America was unsuccessful, earning $3 million in the United States. However, internationally the film was more profitable, earning $17.6 million. The film's box office sales were highly unusual for the time, as major films had typically earned most of their revenue from American audiences. The Producers Sales Organization blamed MGM for the film's underperformance in the United States, arguing that it had been unwilling to market the film due to its controversial subject matter.

=== Home media ===
In 1998, MGM Home Entertainment released the film on video with apparently 3½ minutes of additional footage. An "uncut, uncensored version" was released on DVD by Warner Home Video on September 16, 2008 with a running time of 117 minutes. The film was released by Warner Home Video on Blu-ray in the United States on March 6, 2012.

== Reception ==
=== Critical response ===
On the review aggregator website Rotten Tomatoes, the film holds an approval rating of 58% based on 24 reviews. The website's critics consensus reads, "9 1/2 Weeks' famously steamy sex scenes titillate though the drama unfolding between the beddings is relatively standard for the genre." Metacritic, which uses a weighted average, assigned the film a score of 50 out of 100, based on 13 critics, indicating "mixed or average" reviews. Audiences polled by CinemaScore gave the film an average grade of "C−" on an A+ to F scale.

The film was championed by some critics. Roger Ebert praised the film, giving it three and a half stars out of four, stating: "A lot of the success of 9½ Weeks is because Rourke and Basinger make the characters and their relationship convincing". He further elaborated by saying that their relationship was believable, and unlike many other characters in other erotic films at that time, the characters in this movie are much more real and human.

Over time, some critics and audiences have warmed to the film thanks to its success in the rental market. It performed very well in Europe, particularly in Italy, France and also in Latin America. Its success in France was so strong that it played for five years at a Paris cinema, earning approximately $100 million. In São Paulo, Brazil, it played for 30 months in the cult movie house Cine Belas Artes from 1986 to 1989.

=== Accolades ===
The film was nominated for three categories at the 7th Golden Raspberry Awards, Worst Actress (Kim Basinger, who lost to Madonna for Shanghai Surprise), Worst Original Song ("I Do What I Do" by Jonathan Elias, John Taylor and Michael Des Barres, which lost to "Love or Money" from Under the Cherry Moon), and Worst Screenplay (Patricia Louisianna Knop, Zalman King and Sarah Kernochan, which lost to Howard the Duck). The film gained a huge following on home video, and in spite of its reception, both Basinger and Rourke became huge stars.

== Franchise ==
=== Sequel ===
In 1997, a sequel titled Love in Paris was released direct-to-video. It stars Rourke and Angie Everhart and was directed by Anne Goursaud.

=== Prequel ===
In 1998, a prequel film, titled The First 9½ Weeks starring Paul Mercurio and Clara Bellar, was released straight-to-video.

== See also ==
- Sex in film
