= Hugh J. Schonfield =

British biblical scholar specialising in the New Testament (1901-1988)

- Born: 17 May 1901
- Died: 26 January 1988 (aged 86)

Academic work
- Discipline: Biblical studies
- Main interests: New Testament and the early development of the Christian religion and church
- Notable works: The Authentic New Testament

Hugh Joseph Schonfield (17 May 1901 – 26 January 1988) was a British Bible scholar specialising in the New Testament and the early development of the Christian religion and church. He was born and died in London, and educated there at St Paul's School and King's College, doing additional studies in the University of Glasgow. He was one of the founders and president of the pacifist organisation Commonwealth of World Citizens "Mondcivitan Republic".

== Religious and political beliefs ==
Born Jewish, Schonfield became a liberal and Hebrew Christian who sometimes referred to himself as a Nazarene. In 1937 Schonfield was excluded from membership of the International Hebrew Christian Alliance (IHCA), of which he had been a founding member since 1925, due to his unwillingness to affirm the deity of Jesus. He later associated with Messianic Judaism for a while, but was bitterly disillusioned by the experience. He called himself "the Jewish historian of Christian beginnings", and at the time of his death he was described in obituaries as a "non-practicing Jew."

At one time he was president of the H. G. Wells Society. He founded the "Mondcivitan Republic," Commonwealth of World Citizens, in 1956.

He was one of the signatories of the agreement to convene a convention for drafting a world constitution. As a result, for the first time in human history, a World Constituent Assembly convened to draft and adopt a Constitution for the Federation of Earth.

== Works ==
Schonfield wrote over 40 books including commercially successful books in the fields of history and biography as well as religion. In 1958 his non-ecclesiastical historical translation of the New Testament was published in the UK and the US, titled The Authentic New Testament. This aimed to show without idealised interpretation the meaning intended by the writers while maintaining the original structures. A revised version appeared in 1985 titled The Original New Testament. In 1965 he published the controversial The Passover Plot, a book the thesis of which is that the Crucifixion was part of a larger, conscious attempt by Jesus to fulfill the Messianic expectations rampant in his time, and that the plan went unexpectedly wrong. According to Steve Turner, this was one of the books John Lennon was reading when he commented that the Beatles were "More popular than Jesus".

Schonfield followed The Passover Plot with a sequel in 1968, Those Incredible Christians. This was also described as controversial, but had less impact than the earlier book.

An additional aspect of his work was the revision of the Hebrew writing system. In The New Hebrew Typography, published in 1932, he argued for a significantly revised version of the Hebrew alphabet modelled after the Latin alphabet, including a capital-lowercase distinction, no final forms, a vertical emphasis, and serifs. This alphabet has not been adopted.

== Selected bibliography ==
- An Old Hebrew Text of St. Matthew's Gospel, Translated (translator, with notes and appendices, 1927)
- The Lost 'Book of the Nativity of John' (1929)
- Letters to Frederick Tennyson (editor, 1930)
- The New Hebrew Typography (1932)
- An Astounding Scientific Discovery: The Authentic Photograph of Christ: His Face, and Whole Figure as Marvellously Appearing on the Shroud Which Was Thrown over His Body after the Crucifixion (by Kazimir de Proszynski; edited with an historical supplement by Hugh J. Schonfield)
- The Speech That Moved the World (1932)
- For the Train: Five Poems and a Tale (by Lewis Carroll; arranged poem order, wrote preface, 1932)
- The Book of British Industries (editor, 1933)
- Jesus Christ, Nineteen Centuries After: The Search Symposium by Leaders of the Great World Faiths (1933)
- The History of Jewish Christianity from the First to the Twentieth Century (1936)
- Richard Burton, Explorer (1936)
- Ferdinand de Lesseps (1937)
- According to the Hebrews: a New Translation of the Jewish Life of Jesus (the Toldoth Jeshu), with an Inquiry into the Mature of its Sources and Special Relationship to the Lost Gospel according to the Hebrews (1937)
- Travels and Researches in South Africa
- The Suez Canal (1939)
- Jesus: A Biography (1939)
- The Treaty of Versailles, The Essential Text and Amendments (1940)
- Readings from the Apocryphal Gospels (editor, 1940)
- The Divine Plan of World Government: An Introduction to the Doctrine of a Holy Nation (1940)
- Italy and Suez (1941)
- Judaism and World Order (1943)
- This Man Was Right: Woodrow Wilson Speaks Again (editor, 1943)
- The Jew of Tarsus: An Unorthodox Portrait of Paul (1947)
- Saints Against Caesar: The Rise and Reactions of the First Christian Community (1948)
- The Suez Canal in World Affairs (1952)
- Egypt: Cross-Road on a World Highway (1953)
- Secrets of the Dead Sea Scrolls: Studies Towards their Solution (1956)
- The Bible Was Right: An Astonishing Examination of the New Testament (1956)
- The Song of Songs (editor and translator, 1960)
- A Popular Dictionary of Judaism (1962)
- A History of Biblical Literature (1962)
- The Passover Plot: New Light on the History of Jesus (1965)
- Reader's A-to-Z Bible Companion (1967)
- Those Incredible Christians (1968)
- Suez Canal in Peace and War (1969)
- Travels in Tartary and Thibet (1970)
- Politics of God (1970)
- The Jesus Party (published in the UK as The Pentecost Revolution: The Story of the Jesus Party in Israel, A.D. 36–66, 1974)
- For Christ's Sake: A Discussion of the Jesus Enigma (1975)
- The Shroud of Turin
- The Original New Testament (originally published in 1958 as The Authentic New Testament, updated and re-published under this title in 1985)
- The Essene Odyssey: The Mystery of the True Teacher and the Essene Impact on the Shaping of Human Destiny (1984)
- After the Cross (1981)
- Proclaiming the Messiah: The Life and Letters of Paul of Tarsus, Envoy to the Nations (1997)
- The Mystery of the Messiah (1998)
- Jesus: Man, Mystic, Messiah (2004)

Articles

- Wells as religious humanist
