= Protein asunder homolog =

Protein-coding gene in the species Homo sapiens

INTS13

Identifiers
- Aliases: INTS13, C12orf11, GCT1, Mat89Bb, NET48, SPATA30, ASUN, asunder, spermatogenesis regulator, integrator complex subunit 13
- External IDs: OMIM: 615079; MGI: 1918427; GeneCards: INTS13

Gene location (Human)
Chr.	Chromosome 12 (human)
Band	12p11.23	Start	26,905,181 bp
Band	12p11.23	End	26,938,326 bp

Gene location (Mouse)
Chr.	Chromosome 6 (mouse)
Band	6|6 G3	Start	146,549,632 bp
Band	6|6 G3	End	146,577,835 bp
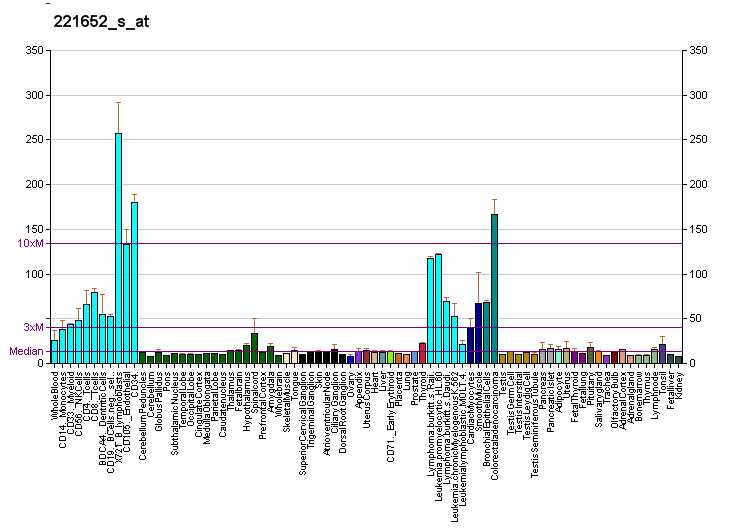
RNA expression pattern
Bgee	Human / Mouse (ortholog); Top expressed in: secondary oocyte; C1 segment; epithelium of nasopharynx; tibia; biceps brachii; germinal epithelium; Skeletal muscle tissue of biceps brachii; gingival epithelium; gonad; retinal pigment epithelium / Top expressed in: otic placode; saccule; otic vesicle; neural layer of retina; tail of embryo; genital tubercle; spermatocyte; epiblast; thymus; ventricular zone; More reference expression data
BioGPS	More reference expression data
Gene ontology
Molecular function	protein binding
Cellular component	cytoplasm; nucleoplasm; nucleus
Biological process	centrosome localization; regulation of fertilization; flagellated sperm motility; mitotic spindle organization; cell cycle; protein localization to nuclear envelope; regulation of mitotic cell cycle; cell division; snRNA transcription by RNA polymerase II
Sources:Amigo / QuickGO
Orthologs
Databases	NCBI: entry; OMA: entry
Species	Human	Mouse
Entrez	55726	71177
Ensembl	ENSG00000064102	ENSMUSG00000040250
UniProt	Q9NVM9	Q8QZV7
RefSeq (mRNA)	NM_018164	NM_138757
RefSeq (protein)	NP_060634	NP_620096; NP_001349035; NP_001349036; NP_001349037
Location (UCSC)	Chr 12: 26.91 – 26.94 Mb	Chr 6: 146.55 – 146.58 Mb
PubMed search
- Wikidata
View/Edit Human	View/Edit Mouse

Protein asunder homolog (Asun) also known as cell cycle regulator Mat89Bb homolog (Mat89Bb) is a protein that in humans is encoded by the Asun gene.
