= Nine and a Half Weeks (book) =

1978 novel by Ingeborg Day

Nine and a Half Weeks: A Memoir of a Love Affair
- First edition cover (1978)
- Author: Ingeborg Day
- Language: English
- Subject: Memoir
- Genre: Nonfiction
- Publisher: Warner
- Publication date: 1978
- Publication place: United States
- Media type: Print, e-book, audiobook
- Pages: 131 pp.
- ISBN: 978-0751510676

Nine and a Half Weeks: A Memoir of a Love Affair is a 1978 memoir by Ingeborg Day, first published under the pen name Elizabeth McNeill. It details the brief, sexually violent relationship between an art gallery owner and a Wall Street broker – based on Day's own experiences. The memoir was famously adapted into the 1986 erotic drama 9½ Weeks, starring Kim Basinger and Mickey Rourke.

== Synopsis ==
The memoir is set in New York City. A magazine editor enters a nine-week affair with a Wall Street broker who regularly sexually abuses her in his apartment for amusement and pleasure. Unable to say no and sinking into complicity, the woman finds herself enjoying the beginning of the affair. Eventually, the relationship culminates in him ordering her to rob a man at knifepoint in an elevator; she does so, and he then forces her to have sex with someone else while he watches.

He often leaves her tied up, in immense pain, in his opulent apartment for hours at a time. She realizes she will have to make a choice between her life and sanity, or an abusive man who has manipulated her into loving him.

The memoir ends with the woman's nervous breakdown when he leaves her at a mental hospital. After undergoing therapy that lasts for months, she is released but never sees him again.

== Reception and legacy ==
The memoir caused a scandal when it was published.

In a 2012 New Yorker article, Sarah Weinman writes "Nine and a Half Weeks is a potent antidote to what passes for erotica today. Instead of over-the-top fictional fantasy, McNeill's book, presented as memoir, is charged as much by explicitness as it is by absence. The reader is only privy to her perspective, and even then, it's occluded by the use of a pseudonym".

While writing the book, Day conceived of it as an "erotic epic poem" and it holds a unique place in erotic literature as it is not an exploration of fantasy, but follows the form of an epic by offering a lengthy, narrative recounting of the sexual deeds and adventures of a woman.
