= Pleasure or Pain =

- Film poster
- Directed by: Zalman King
- Written by: Zalman King
- Produced by: Jon Krogman; Amnon Lisbona; David Saunders; Shane Stanley
- Starring: Malena Morgan; Christos Vasilopoulos
- Cinematography: Matthew Wicks
- Edited by: David Golding; Nicholas Golding
- Music by: Andy Bauer
- Release date: 5 September 2013 (South Korea)
- Running time: 102 minutes
- Country: United States
- Language: English

Pleasure or Pain is a 2013 erotic thriller film written and directed by Zalman King. The film was shot between Malibu, Santa Monica and Westlake in California in the United States.

== Plot ==
Victoria is a beautiful young woman who is just beginning to get a bit of success as a jewelry designer in Los Angeles. One day she meets the handsome and wealthy entrepreneur Jack. He manages to seduce her with an irresistible combination of charm and sensuality. With him, everything is better and more intense than she has ever experienced: love, sex, ecstasy. She wants to do everything to make her lover happy. He keeps on going with his erotic games and he immerses her in a world of sexuality that she didn't even know existed. But after a while, the adventure becomes too much.

== Cast ==
- Malena Morgan: Victoria
- Christos Vasilopoulos: Jack (as Christos G. Vass)
- Kayla Jane: Isabel
- Elle Alexandra: Rita (as Elle Alexandria)
- Daniel Sobieray: Antonio
- Hayden Hawkens: Eve
- Aubrey Addams: Adelaide
- Stephanie Danielson: Trish
- Ela Darling: Attendant
