= Rumah Asun =

- Location within Borneo
- Coordinates: 1.83333°N 111.66667°E
- Country: Malaysia
- State: Sarawak
- Administrative Division: Kanowit
- Elevation: 91 m (299 ft)

Rumah Asun is a settlement in the Kanowit division of Sarawak, Malaysia. It lies approximately 150.9 kilometres (94 mi) east of the state capital Kuching.

Neighbouring settlements include:

- Rumah Milang 2.6 kilometres (1.6 mi) southeast
- Rumah Adam 2.6 kilometres (1.6 mi) northeast
- Rumah Galau 2.6 kilometres (1.6 mi) southwest
- Rumah Jimban 3.7 kilometres (2.3 mi) south
- Rumah Siminai 3.7 kilometres (2.3 mi) north
- Rumah Tuba 4.1 kilometres (2.5 mi) southeast
- Rumah Beli 4.1 kilometres (2.5 mi) northeast
- Rumah Nyumbang 4.1 kilometres (2.5 mi) southwest
- Rumah Nyawai 4.1 kilometres (2.5 mi) southwest
- Rumah Penghulu Linau 5.2 kilometres (3.2 mi) northwest
