= Zalman King =

American director, writer, producer, actor (1941–2012)

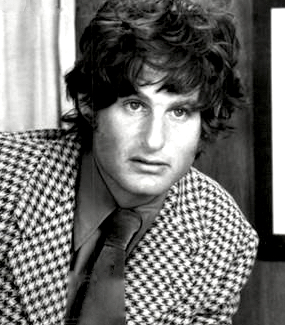
- King in 1971
- Born: Zalman King Lefkowitz; May 23, 1941; Trenton, New Jersey, U.S.
- Died: February 3, 2012 (aged 70); Santa Monica, California, U.S.
- Occupations: Actor; director; writer; producer
- Years active: 1964–2012
- Spouse: Patricia Louisianna Knop (m. 1965)
- Children: 2

Zalman King (born Zalman King Lefkowitz; May 23, 1941 – February 3, 2012) was an American film director, writer, actor and producer. His films are known for incorporating sexuality, and are often categorized as erotica.

== Early life ==
Zalman King Lefkowitz was born in Trenton, New Jersey. He was Jewish.

== Acting ==
Zalman King Lefkowitz dropped his last name at the beginning of his acting career. In 1964, he played a gang member in "Memo from Purgatory", an episode of the television series The Alfred Hitchcock Hour written by Harlan Ellison and featuring actors James Caan and Walter Koenig. In 1965, he appeared with the rock band The Standells playing a beatnik in The Munsters (S1E26). Between 1965 and 1967 King appeared in five episodes of the TV show Gunsmoke, once as the title character "Muley" (S12E18).

King played "The Man" in the 3rd episode of the first season of Adam-12. His character was an apparent drug addict who kidnaps an infant at gunpoint and Officer Malloy disarms him by some reverse psychology.

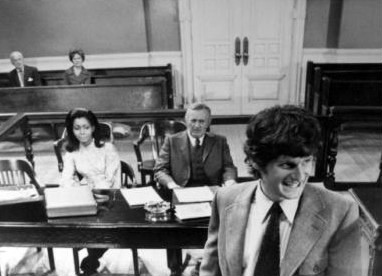
Cast of ABC TV series The Young Lawyers (1970): Judy Pace, Lee J. Cobb, and King.

From September 1970 until May 1971, King played attorney Aaron Silverman on the drama The Young Lawyers, broadcast on the ABC television network. King later contributed a unique delivery to Trip with the Teacher (1975), portraying the psychopathic Al, a murderous motorbiker. His film credits included roles in Stranger on the Run (1967), You've Got to Walk It Like You Talk It or You'll Lose That Beat (1971), The Ski Bum (1971), Neither by Day nor by Night (1972), Some Call It Loving (1973), Trip with the Teacher (1975), The Passover Plot (1976), Blue Sunshine (1977), and Lee Grant's directorial debut feature film Tell Me a Riddle (1980). In 1981 he was featured as Baelon, a rescue team leader in Roger Corman's cult SF horror film, Galaxy of Terror.

== Directing ==
King directed several films, including Two Moon Junction (1988), Wild Orchid (1990), Wild Orchid II: Two Shades of Blue (1991) and Red Shoe Diaries (1992), which became a long-running television series for Showtime network. It spawned many sequels. He directed and co-wrote the movie In God's Hands (1998).

He collaborated with director Adrian Lyne on the film 9½ Weeks which starred Kim Basinger and Mickey Rourke. He produced (and usually directed) the television series and film and Showtime series Body Language. He directed the 1995 film Delta of Venus based on the book by Anaïs Nin. His last film before his death was Pleasure or Pain.

== Personal life and death ==
King was married for 46 years to writer/producer Patricia Louisianna Knop, with whom he collaborated on many projects, including the scripts for Wild Orchid and 9½ Weeks. The couple had two daughters.

He died on February 3, 2012, aged 70, from cancer.

== Filmography ==
=== Actor ===
- 1964: The Munsters, "Far Out Munsters" – The man with the beard
- 1964: The Alfred Hitchcock Hour, "Memo for Purgatory" – gang member
- 1965–67: Gunsmoke, 5 episodes
- 1967: Stranger on the Run – Larkin
- 1968: Adam-12, The Man
- 1969: Land of the Giants (TV series), "The Lost Ones" – Nick
- 1970: The Intruders – Bob Younger
- 1971: You've Got to Walk It Like You Talk It or You'll Lose That Beat – Carter Fields
- 1971: The Ski Bum – Johnny
- 1972: Neither by Day nor by Night – Adam
- 1973: Some Call It Loving – Robert Troy
- 1975: Trip with the Teacher – Al
- 1976: The Passover Plot – Yeshua
- 1977: Blue Sunshine – Jerry Zipkin
- 1979: Charlie's Angels (TV series), "Disco Angels" – Harry Owens
- 1981: Galaxy of Terror – Baelon

=== Director, writer ===
- 1988: Two Moon Junction (Director)
- 1988: Wildfire (Director)
- 1989: Wild Orchid (Director)
- 1991: Wild Orchid II: Two Shades of Blue (Director)
- 1992: Lake Consequence (Writer)
- 1992–1997: Red Shoe Diaries (TV series) (11 episodes)
- 1994: Boca (Director, parts of "Wild Orchid")
- 1995: Delta of Venus (Director)
- 1997: Business for Pleasure (TV) (Co-writer)
- 1997: Shame, Shame, Shame (Director, Executive Producer)
- 1998: Black Sea 213 (Co-writer)
- 1998: A Place Called Truth (Co-writer)
- 1998: In God's Hands (Director)
- 1998: Wind on Water (Director)
- 2000: Women of the Night (Director)
- 2000: Red Shoe Diaries, "Girl on a Bike" (Co-writer)
- 2002: Barely Brooke (TV) (Director)
- 2003: Chromiumblue.com (TV) (Director)
- 2005: Forty Deuce (TV Series) (Director)
- 2006: Crazy Again (Director)
- 2006: Dance with the Devil (Director)
- 2013: Pleasure or Pain (Director)
