= A Maggot =

1985 novel by John Fowles

- First edition
- Author: John Fowles
- Language: English
- Publisher: Jonathan Cape
- Publication date: 1985
- Publication place: United Kingdom
- Media type: Print (hardcover)
- Pages: 460 pp
- ISBN: 0-224-02806-5
- OCLC: 13762191
- Dewey Decimal: 823/.914 19
- LC Class: PR6056.O85 M28 1985a
- Preceded by: Mantissa

A Maggot (1985) is a novel by British author John Fowles. It is Fowles' sixth major novel, following The Collector, The Magus, The French Lieutenant's Woman, Daniel Martin and Mantissa. Its title, as the author explains in the prologue, is taken from the archaic sense of the word that means "whim", "quirk", "obsession", or even a snatch of music (see earworm). Another meaning of the word "maggot" becomes apparent later in the novel, used by a character to describe a white, oblong machine that appears to be a spacecraft. Though the author denied that A Maggot is a historical novel, it does take place during a precise historical timeframe, April 1736 to March 1737, in England. It might be variously classified as historical fiction, mystery, or science fiction. Because of the narrative style and various metafictional devices, most critics classify it as a postmodern novel.

== Plot summary ==
The book opens with an objective narration about a group of five travellers travelling through Exmoor in rural England. They arrive at an inn in a small village, and soon it becomes clear that they are not who they seem to be. The "maid" Louise casually rebuffs the sexual advances of the servant, Dick Thurlow, but then goes to his master's room and undresses before them both. Bartholomew calls his supposed uncle "Lacy" and they discuss Bartholomew's refusal to disclose his journey's secret purpose, as well as fate versus free will. Eventually the narration stops and is followed by letters, interview transcripts, and snatches of more third-person narration, interspersed with facsimile pages from contemporary issues of The Gentleman's Magazine. We learn from a fictional news story that a man has been found hanged near the place where the travellers were staying.

The subsequent interviews are conducted by Henry Ayscough, a lawyer employed by Bartholomew's father, who is a Duke. The interviews reveal that Bartholomew had hired the party to travel with him but deceived them about the purpose of his journey. Variations of his story are (1) he was on his way to elope against the wishes of family; (2) he was visiting a wealthy, aged aunt to secure an inheritance from her; (3) he was seeking a cure for impotence; (4) he was pursuing some scientific or occult knowledge, possibly concerning knowledge of the future. He takes Rebecca and Dick to a cave in a remote area. Rebecca's initial tale, retold by Jones, is that he there performed a satanic ritual, and Rebecca herself was raped by Satan and forced to view a panorama of human suffering and cruelty. Rebecca's own testimony admits this was a deception to quiet Jones. She says that she actually saw Bartholomew meet a noble lady who took them all inside a strange floating craft (which she calls "the maggot"). In this craft she sees what she describes as a divine revelation of heaven ("June Eternal") and the Shaker Trinity (Father, Son, and female Holy Spirit or "Mother Wisdom"). She also sees a vision of human suffering and cruelty in this version of her story. Modern readers may interpret her visions as films and her overall experience as a contact with time travellers or extraterrestrials. Rebecca then loses consciousness; she wakes, finds Jones outside the cave, and they leave together. She then tells Jones the satanic version of her experience. Meanwhile, Jones has seen Dick leave the cave in terror, presumably to go and hang himself.

Rebecca later finds herself pregnant. She returns to her Quaker parents but then converts to Shakerism, marries a blacksmith named John Lee, and gives birth to Ann Lee, the future leader of the American Shakers. The mystery of Bartholomew's disappearance is never solved, and Ayscough surmises that he committed suicide out of guilt from his disobedience to his father in the matter of an arranged marriage.

== Main characters ==
- "Mr. Bartholomew" (real name unknown; son of the Duke): Bartholomew is the instigator of the action (the journey from London to Dolling's Cave) and primary actor in the mysterious event at the core of the plot; his disappearance drives an investigation, the documentation of which makes up the majority of the novel.
- Rebecca Lee (née Hocknell; aliases Fanny, Louise): A former Quaker forced by circumstances into prostitution. Hired by Bartholomew to accompany him on his journey, she is the only living witness of the mysterious event in the cave, and the fictional mother of the real Shaker leader Ann Lee.
- Dick Thurlow: Bartholomew's childhood companion and servant, he is deaf and mute. His apparent suicide following the event in the cave complicates the mystery of Bartholomew's disappearance.
- Francis Lacy (alias Mr. Brown): An actor hired by Bartholomew to play his uncle during the journey. His testimony adds little to the mystery of the disappearance, though it includes several important conversations with Bartholomew about the nature of God, fate, free will, and social justice.
- David Jones (alias Sergeant Farthing): An actor/loafer and acquaintance of Lacy, hired by Bartholomew to play a soldier who protects the travellers. Provides important testimony from the outside of the cave as well as his retelling of the "demonic" version of Rebecca's story.
- Henry Ayscough: A lawyer hired by the Duke to investigate Bartholomew's disappearance. His letters to the Duke which report his progress, as well as the transcripts of his interrogations of various witnesses, make up the majority of the novel.
- The Duke (father of "Bartholomew"): Though he appears in the story only once (briefly), he initiates the investigation, and Ayscough's letters and transcripts are all sent to him. Some critics argue that readers are implicitly identified with the Duke, leading them to examine their assumptions and interpretations critically. It is widely assumed he is gay.

== Technique and themes ==
The novel's narrative technique of using letters, interviews, a fictional news story (see false document), and real historical documents harks back to, and to some extent satirises, the conventions in place early in the history of the novel, when the epistolary novel was the most common form. (Fowles' book is set in 1736, just a few decades after the first novels in English, and just a few years before Samuel Richardson's landmark Pamela.) Originally, these strategies were intended to strengthen the illusion of reality and mitigate the fictionality of fiction; Fowles uses them ironically to highlight the disconnect between fiction and reality. At several points in the novel, the characters or narrator foreground their existence as characters in a story, further highlighting the book's fictionality. Moreover, the novel resists many conventions of fiction, such as the omniscient narrator (Fowles' narrator seems omniscient but divulges little of importance) and the drive for climax and resolution. In particular, the novel resists the convention of detective fiction which satisfies the desire for a final solution.

The novel also examines the nature of history, historiography, and criminal justice, as Ayscough represents the historian/judge trying to create a coherent narrative out of problematic testimonies. The "maggot" itself, as a possible time machine, represents historians as intruders in the past who alter it according to their own desires and needs. The power struggle between Ayscough and Rebecca to create the narrative of the past problematises the objectivity of history, making it subordinate to interests of social class and gender. In the end, Fowles uses Rebecca and Ayscough as representatives of two classes of people, one subjective, intuitive, mystical, artistic (i.e., "right-brained"); the other objective, analytical, and judgmental (i.e., "left-brained"). See cerebral hemisphere.

Finally, Fowles explicitly positions A Maggot in an era which, he claims, saw the beginning of modern selfhood (see self (psychology), self (philosophy), individual). Rebecca is a prototypical modern individual experiencing the difficulty of breaking free from the restraints of society and convention to be radically self-realized. In this we can see Fowles' residual existentialism, though the novel as a whole represents a move beyond existentialism. His postscript both praises the struggle for modern selfhood and criticises it for having been co-opted by capitalism to create excessive consumerism.

== Selected criticism ==
- Brax, Klaus. The Poetics of Mystery: Genre, Representation, and Narrative Ethics in John Fowles's Historical Fiction. Helsinki: University of Helsinki, 2003. ISBN 952-91-5777-0 http://urn.fi/URN:ISBN 952-10-1013-4
- Brigg, Peter. "Maggots, Tropes, and Metafictional Challenge: John Fowles' A Maggot." In Imaginative Futures: Proceedings of the 1993 Science Fiction Research Association Conference. Ed. Milton T. Wolf. San Bernardino: SFRAP, 1996. 293–305. ISBN 0-913960-34-9
- Harding, Brian. "Comparative Metafictions of History: E.L. Doctorow and John Fowles." Chap. 13 in Forked Tongues? Comparing Twentieth-Century British and American Literature. Ed. Ann Massa and Alistair Stead. New York: Longman, 1994. ISBN 0-582-07554-8
- Holmes, Frederick M. "History, Fiction, and Dialogic Imagination: John Fowles' A Maggot." Contemporary Literature 32.2 (1991): 229–43.
- Horstkotte, Martin. The Postmodern Fantastic in Contemporary British Fiction. Trier: Wissenschaftlicher Verlag Trier, 2004. ISBN 3-88476-679-1
- Monnin, Pierre E. "Cumulative Strangeness Without and Within A Maggot by J. Fowles." In On Strangeness. Ed. Margaret Bridges. Tuebingen: Narr, 1990. 151–162. ISBN 3-8233-4680-6
- Onega, Susana. Form and Meaning in the Novels of John Fowles. Ann Arbor, MI: UMI Research Press, 1989. ISBN 0-8357-1949-9
- O'Sullivan, Jane. "'Loquacious with an Obstinate Silence': Sexual and Textual Subversions in Freud's Dora and Fowles' A Maggot." Law and Literature 15.2 (2003): 209–29.
- Roessner, Jeffrey. "Unsolved Mysteries: Agents of Historical Change in John Fowles' A Maggot." Papers on Language and Literature 36.3 (2000): 302–24.
- Carreira, Shirley. "[A Maggot: o século XVIII revisitado]". In: Revista da Anpoll, v.1, n.23,2007.
- Salami, Mahmoud. John Fowles's Fiction and the Poetics of Postmodernism (London and Toronto: Associated University Presses, 1992). ISBN 978-0838634462.
