= Shipwreck (book) =

- Cover of Shipwreck
- Author: John Fowles
- Illustrator: The Gibsons of Scilly
- Language: English
- Publisher: Jonathan Cape
- Publication date: 1974
- Publication place: United Kingdom
- Media type: Print (Hardcover)
- Pages: 48
- ISBN: 0-224-01053-0
- Preceded by: The Ebony Tower
- Followed by: Daniel Martin

Shipwreck is a book published in 1974 that contains text by John Fowles and photography by The Gibsons of Scilly.

== Photography ==
Four generations of The Gibsons of Scilly captured the images of the various sailing vessels and steamers wrecked on the coasts of the Scilly Isles and West Cornwall from the 1860s onwards.
