= Marie-Charlotte de Beauvau =

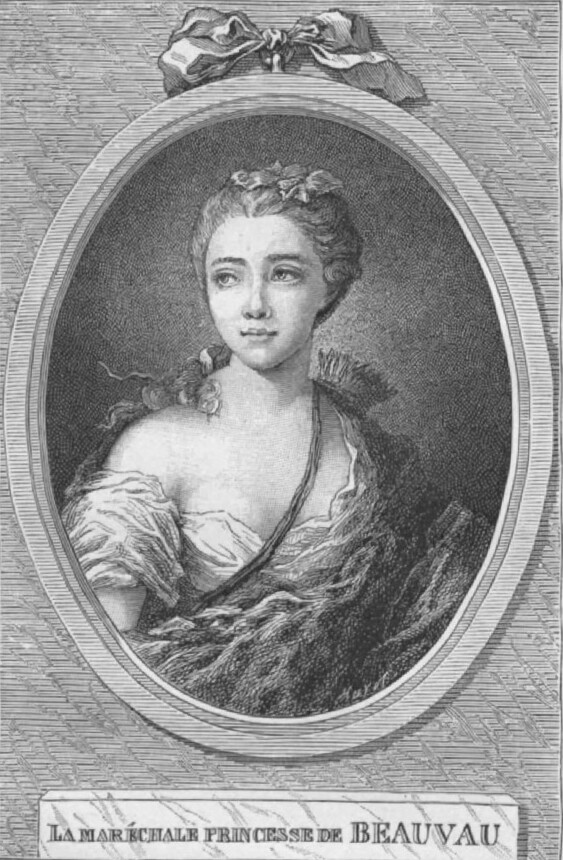
- Born: December 12, 1729
- Died: March 26, 1807; Paris
- Occupation: Memoirist
- Spouse(s): Louis de Clermont d'Amboise, Marquis de Reynel et de Montglas, Charles Juste de Beauvau
- Parents: Guy Auguste de Rohan-Chabot (father); Yvonne Sylvie du Breil de Rays (mother)

Marie-Charlotte-Sylvie de Rohan-Chabot, Maréchale Princesse de Beauvau (December 12, 1729 – March 26, 1807) was a French memoirist.

Marie-Charlotte de Beauvau was born on December 12, 1729, the daughter of Guy Auguste de Rohan-Chabot and Yvonne Sylvie du Breil de Rays. In 1749, she married Jean Baptiste Louis de Clermont d'Amboise, Marquis de Reynel and Marquis de Montglas. In 1764, she married Charles Juste de Beauvau, 2nd Prince of Craon, Marshal of France. They lived in the Hôtel de Beauvau in Paris, where he died in 1793. As the fervor of the French Revolution increased, she lived in the more remote Château du Val in Saint-Germain-en-Laye. She sought the advice of Benjamin Franklin in installing a lightning rod there.

The Beauvau household included an enslaved girl from Senegal named Ourika, who died in 1799 at the age of sixteen and was buried in Saint-Germain-en-Laye. Ourika was the inspiration for the novel Ourika (1823) by Claire de Duras.

Beauvau's memoirs were published by Sabine de Standish, the great-granddaughter of her second husband, as Souvenirs de la Maréchale Princesse De Beauvau in 1872.

Marie-Charlotte de Beauvau died in Paris on 26 March 1807.
