= Stanley Mann =

Canadian-born film and television writer (1928–2016)

- Born: August 8, 1928; Toronto, Ontario, Canada
- Died: January 11, 2016 (aged 87); Los Angeles, California, U.S.
- Education: McGill University
- Occupation: Screenwriter

Stanley Mann (August 8, 1928 – January 11, 2016) was a Canadian screenwriter and playwright. Mann worked in many different genres, but his best known credits included the horror sequel Damien - Omen II, the literary adaptations Woman of Straw, Eye of the Needle and Firestarter and the fantasy film Conan the Destroyer.

== Life and career ==
Born in Toronto, Ontario, he began his writing career in 1951 at CBC Radio. He wrote the play The Gift of the Serpent performed in 1955 at the Crest Theatre in Toronto. He then moved on to screenplays for television and film, with his first screenplay for the 1957 television film adaptation of Death of a Salesman. He was consistently working from the 1960s through 1980s.

He was nominated for an Oscar for his work on the 1965 film The Collector, based on the John Fowles novel of the same title.

He was married to Florence Wood in the 1950s, while living and working in London, England. Following their divorce in 1959, Wood married novelist Mordecai Richler, who adopted Mann's son Daniel.

Mann died on January 11, 2016.

== Partial filmography ==
- The Butler's Night Off (1951 - co-screenplay)
- Death of a Salesman (1957) (television)
- Another Time, Another Place (1958)
- The Mouse That Roared (1959 - co-screenplay)
- His and Hers (1961 - co-screenplay)
- The Mark (1961 - co-screenplay)
- Woman of Straw (1964 - co-screenplay)
- Up from the Beach (1965 - co-screenplay)
- The Collector (1965 - co-screenplay)
- A High Wind in Jamaica (1965 - co-screenplay)
- Rapture (1965)
- The Naked Runner (1967)
- The Strange Affair (1968 - co-screenplay)
- Fräulein Doktor (1969 - writer)
- Theatre of Blood (1973-idea)
- Russian Roulette (1975 - co-screenplay)
- Sky Riders (1976 - co-screenplay)
- Breaking Point (1976 - co-screenplay)
- Damien - Omen II (1978 - co-screenplay)
- Circle of Iron (1978 - co-screenplay)
- Meteor (1979 - co-screenplay)
- Eye of the Needle (1981)
- Draw! (1984)
- Firestarter (1984)
- Conan the Destroyer (1984)
- Tai-Pan (1986 - co-screenplay)
- Hanna's War (1988 - co-screenplay)

=== Actor ===
- Meteor (1979) - Canadian Representative
- Firestarter (1984) - Motel Owner (Last appearance)
