= Tom Adams (illustrator) =

British illustrator

- Born: 29 March 1926; Providence, Rhode Island, US
- Died: 9 December 2019 (aged 93)
- Occupation: Illustrator
- Spouse: Georgie Adams (m. 1972)
- Children: 5

Thomas Charles Renwick Adams (29 March 1926 – 9 December 2019) was a US-born Anglo-Scots illustrator and painter. Long active in a variety of visual formats, he is known for his work in book cover art, portrait painting, poster, advertising and album art. He is most widely known for his book cover art for the paperback editions of Agatha Christie.

== Family background and influence ==
Adams was born into a family of town and urban planners. His grandfather, Thomas Adams (1871–1940), was an influential urban planner, who served as an advisor to Herbert Hoover and Franklin D. Roosevelt and went on to found the Civic Improvement League in 1915 and the Town Planning Institution of Canada in 1919. Indeed, it is not an exaggeration to suggest that Thomas Adams was one of the principal founders of urban planning as a discipline. His two sons went on to make their mark in American and English town and urban planning. The younger son, Frederick Johnstone Adams, was a member of the faculty of MIT from 1932 to 1964, who helped to establish the Department of Urban Studies and Planning, serving as its first Head of Department from 1944 to 1957. Tom Adams's father, James W. Renwick Adams OBE (1898–1969), worked as a planner for the English county council of Kent. From this background, the strong sense of visual composition in Tom Adams's work becomes more understandable. Moreover, Adams's visual work is drawn to the challenge of integrating seemingly disparate elements into an integral whole.

== Early life and career ==
Adams served for two years in the navy (1944–1946). He then trained at the Chelsea School of Art and Goldsmiths College, where he received a National Diploma of Painting in 1949. Between 1953 and 1960 Adams provided illustrations for the youth-oriented UK publications Eagle, Girl and Swift. In 1958, he founded Adams Design Associates with Anna and Andy Garnett, where he produced large murals in the then-new medium of laminated plastic for various firms such as the Royal Bank of Scotland, Chartered Bank, Aspro Nicholas and Airscrew Jicwood.

In 1965, Adams joined his father, the late James W.R. Adams OBE, eminent town planner and landscape architect, who was planning and design consultant to the Poster Advertising Planning Committee, for whom he helped produce a book: Posters Look to the Future.

== Creative activities ==
In the 1960s and 1970s he became involved with several distinguished poets, including Edward Lucie-Smith, Ted Hughes, C. Day Lewis, Brian Patten, George MacBeth and Adrian Henri as well as artists Sandra Blow, John Piper, Josef Herman, and Mark Boyle and among others, producing poetry prints published by his own gallery, the Fulham Gallery, London. Adams also designed posters for Mark Boyle's light shows (The Sensual Laboratory), the Jimi Hendrix Experience and Soft Machine. His connection with the modern world of rock music continued when he met Lou Reed, an admirer of his Christie and Raymond Chandler covers. Adams designed the cover for his first solo album.

During this period, Adams met Virgil Pomfret and joined his artists' agency. Apart from a few gaps when pursuing other activities (like running art galleries), Adams remained with Pomfret for many years. With Pomfret's representation, Adams began a career as a book cover illustrator, most notably for the early John Fowles's novels The Collector, The Magus and The French Lieutenant's Woman and the now famous paperback covers for Agatha Christie (Collins UK and Simon & Schuster USA). A book on these cover paintings, Tom Adams’ Agatha Christie Cover Story with commentary by Julian Symons and Introduction by John Fowles was published in 1981 by Dragons World.

He also designed several covers for Raymond Chandler. Adams also provided the illustrations for the hardback editions of John Fowles' The Collector, The Magus and The French Lieutenant's Woman. He also created the covers for Patrick White's The Vivisector, David Storey's Saville, Peter Straub's Ghost Story, and Kingsley Amis' Colonel Sun.

Around this time, having completed a private commission to paint a portrait of Benjamin Britten in 1971, the Aldeburgh Festival committee commissioned him to produce a limited edition print with William Plomer and Mary Potter as part of the fundraising for the restoration of the Snape Maltings. His occasional portrait commissions have included HRH Prince of Wales, Benjamin Britten (twice), Federico Fellini for the Playboy organisation, Bud Flanagan, Richard Dimbleby, and President Tubman of Liberia. In 1997, he was commissioned to paint a posthumous portrait of Enid Blyton, whose centenary occurred that year, by the family and estate, in the style of the Britten portrait. This was later auctioned at Sotheby's in aid of the Children's Charity, The Royal Variety Club of Great Britain.

Tom Adams worked in films from time to time, mostly science fiction, including 2001: A Space Odyssey and Flash Gordon with Nic Roeg and Mike Hodges. In music, he did covers for Lou Reed's self-titled album and Iron Maiden's compilation Edward the Great.

== The Agatha Christie paperback covers ==
Agatha Christie was no newcomer to the paperback format. Indeed, she was part of Allen Lane’s famous ten-book launch of Penguin Books. The success of Penguin Books in the UK and PocketBooks in the US—niche paperback publishers—in the years following WWII, inspired traditional publishers to produce paperbacks. By the early 60s, Collins decided it wanted to do something more artistically distinct with Christie’s paperback covers. Impressed with Adams’s cover for John Fowles’ The Collector, Collins engaged Adams.

He was commissioned to do a trial cover of A Murder Is Announced, which was published with his cover in 1962. Everyone involved was pleased with the outcome. As a result, Adams ended up doing covers for many of Christie's paperbacks, often more than once. The covers he primarily did not create art for were the pre-1926 books which Fontana did not have the publishing rights to. PocketBooks in the US very much wanted more realistic covers. For this reason, most of Adams's covers for the US editions feature a single dramatic or portentous scene from the novel than spans the front and rear covers. The two exceptions are "Nemesis" and "The Mystery of the Blue Train". Fontana in the UK was much more open to Adams's creative input. Thus, the UK covers were often akin to a stylised tableau or surrealist collage. Adams ended up doing the covers for Agatha Christie paperbacks for twenty-eight years (1962–1980), thus becoming connected with her intimately in the minds of many readers.

== Technique and style ==
Adams's book cover artwork, while usually instantly recognisable, runs to quite distinct modes. Some covers are still-life tableaux; some are depictions of a scene in the novel; some are surrealist collations of items and images. Organizing the vast majority of them, however, is Adams's unique exploration of a form that was vital for much of twentieth-century art: the collage.

Adams's style was to bring a painterly style to collage. Adams's covers that seem like still lifes are, in actuality, juxtapositions of elements and objects that normally are not in such proximity. It is this uncanny proximity—despite (or, rather, precisely because of) the near photo-realistic accuracy—that creates the unsettling effect.

This element also goes to explain one of the most distinctive features of Adams's art: the combination of a sought-after realistic accuracy with an unsettling, surrealist, if not alienating, effect. As Janet Morgan, Agatha Christie's first biographer, put it, Adams's drawings are "alarmingly realistic."

== Doctor Who ==
Adams' design for the Fontana Books edition of the Agatha Christie mystery Death in the Clouds, featuring a giant wasp, inspired the monster in the Doctor Who adventure The Unicorn and the Wasp, broadcast in 2008. A copy of the book, featuring Adams' cover, appeared in the episode.

== Awards and publications ==
Adams won various awards for illustration, notably the American Society of Illustrators, The American Art Directors Association, and The Design and Art Directors Association, UK. His work is in numerous private collections and he exhibited in London, Toronto, Tokyo, Dublin, Sydney, Marbella, and more recently in Exeter and Torquay, the setting for many of Agatha Christie's mysteries. He designed, printed and published his own limited editions.

Two monographs have been published on his work: Tom Adams' Agatha Christie Cover Story (published as Agatha Christie: The Art of Her Crimes in the United States), Paper Tiger, 1981 and Tom Adams Uncovered, HarperCollins, 2015.
