= The Collector (1965 film) =

1965 film by William Wyler

- Theatrical release poster
- Directed by: William Wyler
- Screenplay by: Stanley Mann; John Kohn
- Based on: The Collector (1963 novel) by John Fowles
- Produced by: Jud Kinberg; John Kohn
- Starring: Terence Stamp; Samantha Eggar
- Cinematography: Robert Krasker; Robert Surtees
- Edited by: David Hawkins; Robert Swink
- Music by: Maurice Jarre
- Distributed by: Columbia Pictures
- Release dates: May 20, 1965 (Cannes); June 17, 1965 (U.S.); October 13, 1965 (London)
- Running time: 119 minutes
- Country: United States; United Kingdom
- Language: English
- Box office: $3.5 million (rentals)

The Collector is a 1965 psychological horror film directed by William Wyler, adapted by Stanley Mann and John Kohn from the 1963 novel by John Fowles. It stars Terence Stamp as a young man who abducts a beautiful art student, played by Samantha Eggar, holding her captive in the basement of his rural farmhouse.

The film premiered at the 1965 Cannes Film Festival, where both Stamp and Eggar won the awards for Best Actor and Best Actress, respectively. Upon its theatrical release in June 1965, the film received largely favorable reviews. Eggar won a Golden Globe Award for Best Actress in a Motion Picture – Drama for her performance, and was also nominated for the Academy Award for Best Actress, while Wyler received his 12th and final nomination for Best Director.

== Plot ==
Freddie Clegg is a lonely, socially awkward young man who purchases a 17th-century Kent farmhouse with winnings he has earned from the football pools. An amateur entomologist, he spends his time capturing butterflies, of which he has a large collection. He begins stalking a bourgeois London art student named Miranda Grey. One day, he follows Miranda into a pub in Hampstead before abducting her on the street, incapacitating her with chloroform.

Miranda awakens inside the cavernous, windowless stone cellar of Freddie's farmhouse, which he has adorned with a bed, furnishings, clothing, painting tools, and an electric heater. She assumes she has either been taken for ransom or to be used as a sex slave and insists to Freddie that her father is not wealthy. Freddie explains he is not seeking sex or ransom; he explains that he and Miranda used to ride on the same bus years earlier in Reading and that he continued to follow her into London after she enrolled in art school. When he proclaims his love for Miranda, she fakes appendicitis as a ploy to escape but is caught. Freddie agrees that he will free Miranda after four weeks, an allotted period he believes will allow her to "get to know him".

Freddie gradually allows Miranda small luxuries, such as leaving the cellar to obtain sunlight and take baths in the house under his supervision. When he fondles her aggressively, she tells him she will not fight him should he rape her, but that she will lose all respect for him. During one of her baths, Freddie's neighbor, Colonel Whitcombe, arrives at the farmhouse to introduce himself, resulting in Freddie gagging Miranda and tying her to pipes in the bathroom. She floods the bathroom in an attempt to get Whitcombe's attention, but Freddie diverts him, claiming his girlfriend inadvertently left the tub running.

Freddie recurrently mentions one of Miranda's boyfriends, with whom he observed her socializing on numerous occasions. He allows Miranda to write a letter to her mother but discovers a small piece of paper in the envelope asking for help, and tears the letter apart in front of her. During a conversation about art and literature, Miranda further alienates Freddie, who accuses her of being an elitist. He proclaims that they could never be friends in "the real world".

On the thirtieth—and allegedly final—day of her captivity, Freddie prepares a meal in the house for Miranda and gives her a dress to wear for the occasion. Over dinner, he asks Miranda to marry him. She agrees, but Freddie senses her hesitation. He then confronts her for being disingenuous, reminding her that witnesses are needed for a formal marriage. Miranda pleads with Freddie that he had promised to let her go after thirty days, but he simply tells her that he can do as he wishes. Feeling completely trapped, Miranda attempts to flee the house, but he corners her in his study and chloroforms her before lying with her in an upstairs bedroom. When she regains consciousness in the cellar, Freddie assures her that he did not rape her. He tells her he intends to keep her until she "tries" to fall in love with him. After having a bath one night, Miranda unsuccessfully attempts to seduce him, but he senses her artifice and compares her to a prostitute.

When Freddie escorts her back to the cellar during a rainstorm, Miranda seizes a shovel with which she strikes him on the head. Though wounded, Freddie takes advantage of Miranda's subsequent hesitation and manages to drag her back into the cellar. She accidentally breaks the electric heater just after their struggle. Miranda remains locked in the cold cellar, soaking wet, while Freddie receives medical attention. He returns three days later to find Miranda ill with pneumonia and goes into town to get a doctor. When he returns, having changed his mind about a doctor, he finds Miranda dead. Freddie buries the corpse under an oak tree on his property.

A short time later, Freddie, convinced Miranda brought her fate on herself, again drives around, now stalking a young nurse in the hopes that he might have better success overall with a different sort of woman.

== Production ==
=== Screenplay ===
William Wyler turned down The Sound of Music to direct the film.

The screenplay was written by Stanley Mann and John Kohn, based on the novel by John Fowles. However, Terry Southern contributed an uncredited script revision for Wyler after the producers became unhappy with the book's original darker ending; they wanted Miranda to escape. Southern's "happier" ending was rejected by Wyler.

=== Casting ===
Actor	Role
Terence Stamp	Frederick "Freddie" Clegg
Samantha Eggar	Miranda Gray
Mona Washbourne	Aunt Annie
Maurice Dallimore	Colonel Whitcombe
Allyson Ames	First Victim
Edina Ronay	The Nurse
William Beckley	Crutchley

Wyler considered a number of performers for the two central roles of Freddie Clegg and Miranda Grey, around whom the film almost exclusively revolves. Sarah Miles and Natalie Wood were considered for the role of Miranda, while Anthony Perkins and Dean Stockwell were considered for the role of Freddie. Wyler ultimately chose English actors Terence Stamp and Samantha Eggar because he felt that together they possessed the correct chemistry of sexual tension and awkwardness. Wyler was also aware that Stamp had been attracted to Eggar while the two were studying together at Webber Douglas Academy of Dramatic Art.

The supporting role of Aunt Annie was played by Mona Washbourne, while Kenneth More was cast as George Paston, or "G.P.", a man in the source novel to whom Miranda writes to extensively, and whom she admires. More's scenes were ultimately excised from the final cut of the film. It was the only film More made in Hollywood.

Richard Todd said Wyler offered him the lead in the film but Todd felt he would be miscast and persuaded the director of this.

=== Filming ===
"At first I felt that I just couldn't do it. It took me five weeks to be on Wyler's wave length."

— Eggar on the difficulties acclimating to Wyler's work style, 1965

Principal photography for The Collector began in May 1964 at the Columbia Pictures soundstages in Los Angeles, California. Tensions between Eggar, and Wyler and Stamp arose after Wyler privately instructed Stamp to stay in character and give Eggar the cold shoulder during the filming. Wyler was also unfriendly toward Eggar on set, as he felt the atmosphere would impose a sense of isolation for her, thus eliciting a stronger performance. Fowles observed that "the favorite sport on the Columbia lot is making fun of her behind her back." The stress on set resulted in Eggar losing 10 pounds (4.5 kg) during rehearsals and flubbing her lines. "I guess I was supposed to feel trapped, and I did," she recalled. Three weeks into rehearsals, Wyler fired Eggar as he was displeased with her performance, resulting in the production shutting down. After the film's second-unit director completed a full read-through of the entire screenplay with Eggar, she was re-hired under the provision that Kathleen Freeman, a character actress, serve as her coach on set. Off-camera, Eggar was allowed to speak only to Freeman. Eggar stated that Wyler was "100% demanding. He works you to your peak. When it's over, you realize that you have done the best you could possibly do."

A journalist visiting the set during one day of filming noted: "The dialogue was tricky. The movement of the camera was difficult. It was the kind of scene that rubs nerves raw and kindles outbursts of temperament. But not when Wyler's behind the camera. The doughty little director spent the entire morning rehearsing and then shooting the scene time and time again. Stamp and Eggar were as meek and cooperative as neophytes."

In late June 1964, the production relocated to England for filming of the exterior scenes, which included on-location shooting in Mount Vernon, Hampstead, London and Forest Row, East Sussex. The exteriors of Freddie's house were filmed at a 400-year-old farmhouse in rural Kent. After location shoots were completed in England, the production returned to Los Angeles, where the remainder of the shoot occurred, concluding in mid-July. By the end of the shoot, Eggar had reportedly lost a total of 14 pounds (6.4 kg).

=== Post-production ===
The original cut of The Collector ran for three hours. Because of pressure from his producers, Wyler was forced to cut the film heavily, removing 35 minutes of prologue material starring Kenneth More. Wyler said, "Some of the finest footage I ever shot wound up on the cutting room floor, including Kenneth's part."

== Release ==
The Collector premiered at the Cannes Film Festival on May 3, 1965, where both Stamp and Eggar won awards for Best Actor and Best Actress, respectively. This marked the first time in the festival's history that two performers from the same film won both awards. Wyler was nominated for the Palme d'Or.

The film had its North American premiere in New York City on June 17, 1965. It premiered in London on October 13, 1965.

=== Home media ===
In the United States, Columbia Pictures Home Entertainment first released The Collector on VHS in 1980. Sony Pictures Home Entertainment issued a DVD on October 9, 2002. A Blu-ray was subsequently released by Image Entertainment in 2011. On September 24, 2018, the United Kingdom-based Powerhouse Films released a region-free Blu-ray in their limited edition Indicator series; this edition features numerous interviews and archival material as bonus features. This marked the film's first availability on Blu-ray in the United Kingdom.

== Reception ==
=== Critical response ===
Bosley Crowther of The New York Times wrote that Terence Stamp's character was "entirely mystifying and fascinating" at the beginning, but once it became apparent that nothing more was going to be learned about him "he tends to become monotonous, and finally, a melodramatic blob." Crowther's review concluded that Wyler had made "a tempting and frequently startling, bewitching film, but he has failed to make it any more than a low-key chiller that melts in a conventional puddle of warm blood towards the end." A positive review in Variety called the film "a solid, suspenseful enactment of John Fowles' bestselling novel," directed by Wyler "with taste and imagination." Philip K. Scheuer of the Los Angeles Times wrote of the film that "if it is too clinical to touch any of the livelier emotions — the strongest one it can arouse is hope, and this is blasted again and again — it still manages to picque intellectual curiosity sufficiently to attract the art-house patron in search of the odd or offbeat."

Philip Kopper of The Washington Post called it "a fantastic film" that he thought was stronger than the novel because Wyler "removed many of the redundancies and collateral elements." Writing for The Courier-Journal, William Mootz praised the film for its "atmosphere of oppressive tension" and an "anguishing excursion into horror fiction."

Edith Oliver of The New Yorker panned the film as "a preposterous fake that pretends to deal seriously with psychopathic behavior but cannot be taken seriously even as a thriller. It evokes no pity, no wonder, no horror, no suspense, no belief, and who cares how it comes out?" John Russell Taylor of Sight & Sound wrote that while the film played as a "diluted version" of the novel, "what we are left with, though paper-thin, is perfectly clear and rather grippingly told." The Monthly Film Bulletin stated that "all the tensions between scenes, the undercurrents beneath what the characters say and do, seem to have disappeared, leaving a good story adequately told but without much cutting edge ... On the other hand, the main body of the story comes over remarkably well."

The novel's author, John Fowles, insisted on writing the screenplay himself for the next film adaptation of his work The Magus, apparently motivated by his disappointment with this film. The Magus was a critical disaster, some of the blame being laid upon drastic rewrites of Fowles' screenplay.

As of 2025, on the internet review aggregator Rotten Tomatoes, The Collector has an 81% approval rating, based on 16 reviews.

=== Awards and nomination ===
Awards	Category	Recipient(s)	Result	Ref.
Academy Awards	Best Director	William Wyler	Nominated	
Academy Awards	Best Actress	Samantha Eggar	Nominated	
Academy Awards	Best Screenplay – Based on Material from Another Medium	Stanley Mann and John Kohn	Nominated	
Cannes Film Festival	Palme d'Or	William Wyler	Nominated	
Cannes Film Festival	Best Actor	Terence Stamp	Won	
Cannes Film Festival	Best Actress	Samantha Eggar	Won	
Golden Globe Awards	Best Motion Picture – Drama		Nominated	
Golden Globe Awards	Best Actress in a Motion Picture – Drama	Samantha Eggar	Won	
Golden Globe Awards	Best Director – Motion Picture	William Wyler	Nominated	
Golden Globe Awards	Best Screenplay – Motion Picture	Stanley Mann and John Kohn	Nominated	
Laurel Awards	Top Drama		5th Place	
Laurel Awards	Top Female Dramatic Performance	Samantha Eggar	Nominated	
Sant Jordi Awards	Best Foreign Film	William Wyler	Won	
Sant Jordi Awards	Best Actress in a Foreign Film	Samantha Eggar	Won	
Turkish Film Critics Association Awards	Best Foreign Film		3rd Place	
Writers Guild of America Awards	Best Written American Drama	Stanley Mann and John Kohn	Nominated	

The Collector was the last of Wyler's record 12 Academy Award nominations for Best Director.

== Inspiration for crimes ==
In 1988, Robert Berdella held his male victims captive and photographed their torture before killing them. Upon being apprehended, he claimed that the film version of The Collector had been an integral inspiration to him after seeing it as a teenager.

== See also ==
- Leonard Lake
- What Difference Does It Make?

== Sources ==
- Booker, Keith M. (2011). Historical Dictionary of American Cinema. Lanham, Maryland: Scarecrow Press. ISBN 978-0-810-87459-6.
- Haun, Harry (2000). The Cinematic Century: An Intimate Diary of America's Affair with the Movies. New York: Applause. ISBN 978-1-557-83400-3.
- Luhr, William (1987). World Cinema Since 1945. New York: Ungar. ISBN 978-0-804-43078-4.
- McClelland, Doug (1972). The Unkindest Cuts: The Scissors and the Cinema. London: A. S. Barnes. ISBN 978-0-498-07825-5.
- Meehan, Paul (2014). Horror Noir: Where Cinema's Dark Sisters Meet. Jefferson, North Carolina: McFarland. ISBN 978-0-786-46219-3.
- Monush, Barry (2009). Everybody's Talkin': The Top Films of 1965-1969. New York: Applause Books. ISBN 978-1-557-83618-2.
- Newton, Michael (2002). The Encyclopedia of Kidnappings. New York: Facts on File. ISBN 978-1-438-12988-4.
- Vipond, Diann, ed. (2000). Conversations with John Fowles. Jackson, Mississippi: University Press of Mississippi. ISBN 978-1-578-06191-4.
- Warburton, Eileen (2015). "Bluebeard's Basement: The Collector On Film". In Aubrey, James (ed.). Filming John Fowles: Critical Essays on Motion Picture and Television Adaptations. Jefferson, North Carolina: McFarland. pp. 13–34. ISBN 978-0-786-49764-5.
