= Tony Kenrick =

Australian-American novelist (born 1935)

- Born: August 24, 1935; Sydney, Australia
- Occupation: Novelist
- Spouse: Joan May Wells (b. April 13, 1960)
- Children: 2, Melanie and Timothy
- Parents: Arthur Francis Cohen; Freda Kenrick
- Writing career
- Years active: 1970-1991
- Genres: Thriller fiction, caper story
- Notable works: Stealing Lillian; The Night-Time Guy

Tony Kenrick (born 1935) is an Australian-born writer of thriller fiction and caper comedies. Two of his novels were adapted into movies, and several more were optioned.

In a typical Kenrick novel, a protagonist sets out to make some easy money, more or less legally, but winds up helping to save the day against really dangerous villains. Some of his books contain elements of science fiction, most notably The Night-Time Guy (1979) and Glitterbug (1991), which feature protagonists who are not scientists but find themselves the victims of science-fictional circumstances. His comical crime novels have been compared with those of Donald E. Westlake.

Kenrick's 1975 novel Stealing Lillian, in which a con artist is enlisted to stage a kidnapping in order to capture a gang of terrorists, was included in the Tozai Mystery Best 100 list of 1985. Art Bourgeau called it a "classic" in The Mystery Lover's Companion (1986).

== Career ==
Kenrick began work as a copywriter, and later an advertising executive, in Australia, before moving abroad and writing fiction as well. His work brought him and his family to Toronto, New York City, San Francisco, London, Es Capdellà in Mallorca, and Weston, Connecticut.

=== Advertising ===
Kenrick worked in the field of advertising before also turning his hand to writing fiction. After some years spent working in Australia, he was hired at the New York firm of Kenyon & Eckhardt as a copywriter in 1967.

One of his accounts was the 1980s ad campaign for Birds Eye frozen foods. With colleague Vernon Howe, he wrote the TV commercial slogans "It can make a dishonest woman of you" for their Chicken Pies, and "When you've got to make it something fast" for their Beef Burgers. A colleague recalled that Kenrick wrote his novels at his desk during the lunch hour.

Kenrick left his career in advertising in 1972 to become a full-time writer.

=== Writing career ===
He published his first novel, The Only Good Body's a Dead One, in 1970, and became a free-lance novelist in 1972.

Kenrick developed links to the film industry in the 1980s. He wrote the screenplay for his third novel, Two for the Price of One, which became Nobody's Perfekt, starring Gabe Kaplan. He said in a 1981 interview, "Of the eleven books I've written, eight have been optioned for movies or television. But until now, none of them has ever gotten past the deal stage and onto the screen. I was delighted to do my first screenplay, and see one of my books turned into a movie in the process." Screenwriters John Kohn and Robert Bentley adapted his 1985 novel Faraday's Flowers into Shanghai Surprise, which starred Sean Penn and Madonna. Both movies were poorly received.

He sold the film rights for other novels, including A Tough One to Lose and Stealing Lillian. 20th Century Fox purchased The Seven Day Soldiers, to be directed by Robert Aldrich and to star Steve McQueen, but the project fell through. Tri-Star Pictures bought rights to the science fiction novel Glitterbug, to star Bruce Willis. In 1998, independent producers John H. Williams and Barnaby Thompson (calling it "laugh-out-loud funny") optioned Kenrick's unpublished novel Made for Each Other (re-titled Fit to be Tied), a road comedy about two unhappily married couples who find themselves face-to-face with ex-lovers during a bungled heist and a hostage situation. Despite film industry enthusiasm for Kenrick's works, none of these movies were produced.

According to the American Film Institute, Kenrick was hired to write the screenplay for the film Chattanooga Choo Choo, but he is not credited onscreen.

Under the pen name Joe De Mers, he wrote a play entitled The Return (1996). The University of Queensland's AustLit database reports, "Tony Kenrick is also the author of Up Against the House, which cannot be traced, and several screenplays."

In a review of The Night-Time Guy, Kirkus Reviews wrote, "When a suspense writer can swing out with guts, endearing sarcasm, and raw bravado the way that Tony Kenrick can, the most farfetched plotting can be forgiven — even enjoyed for its sheer outrageousness. ... Knockdown rough stuff — not for the squeamish — but Kenrick (The Seven Day Soldiers) knows how to keep the atmosphere somehow likable, light, and humane as the nonstop physical abuses hurtle along."

== Personal life ==
Born Anthony Arthur Kenrick in Sydney, New South Wales, Australia on August 23, 1935, Tony Kenrick is the son of Arthur Francis Cohen, an engineer, and Freda Kenrick, a mind reader. He served in the Royal Australian Navy in 1953. He married Joan May Wells, a Welsh painter, and their two children are Melanie and Timothy.

== Bibliography ==
- The Only Good Body's a Dead One (Simon and Schuster, 1970) ISBN 0-671-21008-4
- A Tough One to Lose (Bobbs Merrill, 1972) ISBN 0-71811-060-9
- Two for the Price of One (Bobbs Merrill, 1974) ISBN 0-67251-888-0
- Stealing Lillian, a.k.a. The Kidnap Kid (David McKay, 1975) ISBN 0-67950-544-X
- The Seven Day Soldiers (Henry Regnery, 1976) ISBN 0-80928-127-9
- The Chicago Girl (Putnam, 1976) ISBN 0-39911-810-1
- Two Lucky People (Michael Joseph, 1978) ISBN 0-71811-657-7
- The Night-Time Guy (William Morrow, 1979) ISBN 0-45109-111-6
- The 81st Site (New American Library, 1980) ISBN 0-45300-379-6
- Blast (Signet, 1984) ISBN 0-45112-955-5
- Faraday's Flowers (Doubleday, 1985) ISBN 0-38519-088-3
- China White (Little Brown, 1986) ISBN 0-31648-917-4
- Neon Tough (G. P. Putnam's Sons, 1988) ISBN 978-0-399-13392-3
- Glitterbug (Carroll & Graf, 1991) ISBN 978-0-881-84748-2

== Filmography ==
- Nobody's Perfekt (based on Two for the Price of One)
- Shanghai Surprise (based on Faraday's Flowers)
