= The French Lieutenant's Woman =

1969 novel by John Fowles

- First US edition
- Author: John Fowles
- Language: English
- Genre: Postmodern literature, romance novel, historical fiction, historiographic metafiction, pastiche
- Published: 10 November 1969
- Publisher: Jonathan Cape (UK); Little, Brown (US)
- Publication place: Great Britain
- Media type: Print
- Pages: 445
- ISBN: 0-224-61654-4
- OCLC: 40359110
- Dewey Decimal: 823/.9/14
- LC Class: PZ4.F788 Fr PR6056.O85

The French Lieutenant's Woman is a 1969 postmodern historical fiction novel by John Fowles. The plot explores the fraught relationship of gentleman and amateur naturalist Charles Smithson and Sarah Woodruff, the former governess and independent woman with whom he falls in love. The novel builds on Fowles's authority in Victorian literature, both following and critiquing many of the conventions of period novels.

The book was the author's third, after The Collector (1963), and The Magus (1965). American Libraries magazine counted the novel among the "Notable Books of 1969". Subsequent to its initial popularity, publishers produced numerous editions and translated the novel into many languages; soon after the initial publication, the novel was also treated extensively by scholars. The novel remains popular, figuring in both public and academic conversations. In 2005 Time chose the book as one of the 100 best English-language novels since the magazine began publication in 1923.

Part of the novel's reputation concerns its postmodern literary qualities, with expressions of metafiction, historiography, metahistory, Marxist criticism, and feminism. Stylistically and thematically, the novel has been described as historiographic metafiction. The contrast between the independent Sarah Woodruff and the more stereotypical male characters often earns the novel attention for its treatment of gender issues.

The novel was adapted into a film in 1981, with script by the playwright Harold Pinter, directed by Karel Reisz, starring Meryl Streep and Jeremy Irons. The film received considerable critical acclaim, including several BAFTA and Golden Globe awards.

== Plot summary ==
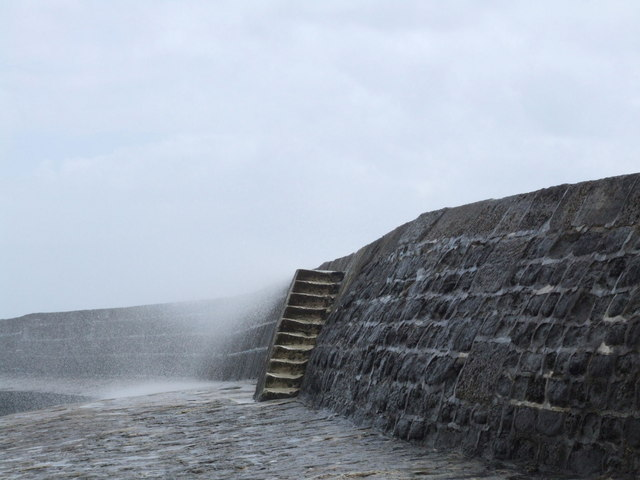
The Cobb at Lyme Regis, near where Charles and Ernestina first encounter Sarah.

Set in the mid-nineteenth century, the narrator identifies the novel's protagonist as Sarah Woodruff, the Woman of the title, also known as "Tragedy" and as "The French Lieutenant's Whore". She lives in the coastal town of Lyme Regis as a disgraced woman, supposedly abandoned by a French ship's officer named Varguennes who had returned to France and married. Employed as a servant in the household of the very pious Mrs. Poulteney, she spends some of her limited free time on The Cobb, a stone jetty where she stares out to sea.

One day, Charles Smithson, an orphaned gentleman, and Ernestina Freeman, his fiancée and a daughter of a wealthy tradesman, see Sarah walking along the cliffside. Ernestina tells Charles something of Sarah's story, and he becomes curious about her. Though continuing to court Ernestina, Charles has several more encounters with Sarah, meeting her clandestinely three times. During these meetings, Sarah tells Charles of her history, and asks for his emotional and social support. During the same period, he learns of the possible loss of his place as heir to his elderly uncle, who has become engaged to a woman young enough to bear a child. Meanwhile, Charles's servant Sam falls in love with Mary, the maid of Ernestina's aunt.

In fact, Charles has fallen in love with Sarah and advises her to leave Lyme for Exeter. Returning from a journey to warn Ernestina's father about his uncertain inheritance, Charles stops in Exeter as if to visit Sarah. From there, the narrator, who intervenes throughout the novel and later becomes a character in it, offers three different ways in which the novel could end:

- First ending: Charles does not visit Sarah, but immediately returns to Lyme to reaffirm his love for Ernestina. They marry, though the marriage never becomes particularly happy, and Charles enters trade under Ernestina's father, Mr. Freeman. The narrator pointedly notes the lack of knowledge about Sarah's fate. Charles tells Ernestina about an encounter which he implies is with the "French Lieutenant's Whore", but elides the sordid details, and the matter is ended. The narrator dismisses this ending as a daydream by Charles, before the alternative events of the subsequent meeting with Ernestina are described. Critic Michelle Phillips Buchberger describes this first ending as "a semblance of verisimilitude in the traditional 'happy ending'" found in actual Victorian novels.

Before the second and third endings, the narrator appears as a character sharing a railway compartment with Charles. He tosses a coin to determine the order in which he will portray the other two possible endings, emphasising their equal plausibility. They are as follows:

- Second ending: Charles and Sarah have a rash sexual encounter in which Charles realises that Sarah was a virgin. Reflecting on his emotions during this, Charles ends his engagement to Ernestina, and proposes to Sarah through a letter. Charles's servant Sam fails to deliver the letter and, after Charles breaks his engagement, Ernestina's father disgraces him. His uncle marries and his wife bears an heir, ensuring the loss of the expected inheritance. To escape the social suicide and depression caused by his broken engagement, Charles goes abroad to Europe and America. Ignorant of Charles's proposal, Sarah flees to London without telling her lover. During Charles's trips abroad, his lawyer searches for Sarah, finding her two years later living in the Chelsea house of the painter and poet Dante Gabriel Rossetti at 16 Cheyne Walk, where she enjoys an artistic, creative life. Sarah shows Charles the child of their affair, leaving him in hope that the three may be reunited.
- Third ending: The narrator re-appears outside the Cheyne Walk house and turns back his pocket watch by fifteen minutes. Events are the same as in the second-ending version until Charles meets Sarah, when their reunion is sour. The new ending does not make clear the parentage of the child and Sarah expresses no interest in reviving the relationship. Charles leaves the house, intending to return to the United States, wondering whether Sarah is a manipulative, lying woman who exploited him.

== Background ==
Before Fowles published The French Lieutenant's Woman in 1969, he had already established his literary reputation with the novels The Collector (1963) and The Magus (1965). While writing The French Lieutenant's Woman, he was working on the screenplay for the film adaptation of The Magus (1968). Moreover, The Collector had already been adapted into a 1965 film which had gained Fowles further popular attention.

Fowles described his main inspiration for The French Lieutenant's Woman to be a persistent image of a "Victorian Woman", who later developed into the novel's titular character Sarah Woodruff. In the 1969 essay "Notes on an Unfinished Novel", Fowles reflected on his writing process. He said he had an image during the autumn of 1966 of: "A woman [who] stands at the end of a deserted quay and stares out to sea." He determined that she belonged to a "Victorian Age" and had "mysterious" and "vaguely romantic" qualities. He made a note at the time about the function of the novel:

"You are not trying to write something one of the Victorian novelists forgot to write; but perhaps something one of them failed to write. And: Remember the etymology of the word. A novel is something new. It must have relevance to the writer's now – so don't ever pretend you live in 1867; or make sure the reader knows it's a pretence."

In an appended comment, dated "October 27, 1967", he writes that he finished the first draft of the novel at about 140,000 words.

Throughout the essay, Fowles describes multiple influences and issues important to the novel's development, including his debt to other authors such as Thomas Hardy. In the essay, he describes surprise that the female character Sarah had taken the primary role in the novel. Later, Fowles described other influences shaping the characters' development, noting that the characters and story of The French Lieutenant's Woman were loosely derived from the Claire de Duras novel Ourika (1823), which features a tragic affair between an African woman and French military man. Fowles later published a 1977 translation of Ourika into English.

== Characters ==
- The Narrator – as in other works of metafiction, the narrator's voice frequently intervenes in the story with a personality of its own. Though the voice appears to be that of Fowles, Magali Cornier Michael notes that chapter 13, which discusses the role of author and narrator within fiction, distinguishes between the author's role in the text and the narrator's. Alice Ferrebe describes the narrator as both a lens for critiquing traditional gender roles and a perpetuation of the perspectives on gendered identity perpetuated by the male gaze.
- Sarah Woodruff – the main protagonist according to the narrator. Formerly a governess, she becomes disgraced after an illicit, but unconsummated, liaison with an injured French naval lieutenant, who was washed ashore. The feminist critic Magali Cornier Michael argues that she is more a plot device, not interpretable as a main character because her thoughts and motivations are only interpreted from the perspective of outside male characters. Sarah offers a representation of myth or symbol within a male perspective on women.
- Charles Smithson – the main male character. Though born into a family with close ties to nobility, Smithson does not possess a title but has a sizable income and considerable education. Early in the novel he is described both as a casual naturalist and a Darwinist. Though trying to become an enlightened and forward-thinking individual, the narrator often emphasises, through commentary on Smithson's actions and situation, that his identity is strongly rooted in the traditional social system. Moreover, conflicting identification with social forces, such as science and religion, lead Smithson to an existential crisis.
- Ernestina Freeman – Smithson's fiancée and daughter to a London-based owner of department stores. Unlike Sarah, Ernestina's temperament is much less complex, and much more simple-minded.
- Sam Farrow – Charles's Hackney servant with aspirations to become a haberdasher. Throughout the novel, Sam becomes the narrator's model for the working class peoples of Victorian Britain, comparing Sam's identity with Charles's ignorance of that culture. According to critic David Landrum, the tension between Sam and Charles Smithson importantly demonstrates Marxist class struggle, though this aspect of the novel is often overlooked by criticism emphasizing Charles's relationship to Sarah.
- Dr Grogan – an Irish doctor in the town of Lyme Regis who both advises the various upper-class families in the town, and becomes an adviser to Charles. His education and interest in Darwin and other education make him a good companion for Charles.
- Mr Freeman – the father of Ernestina, he earned his wealth as an owner of a drapery and clothes sales chain of stores. He "represents the rising entrepreneurial class in England" which stands in stark contrast to the old money which Smithson comes from.
- Mrs Tranter – a prominent member of Lyme Regis society who is friends with Grogan and, as her maternal aunt, hosts Ernestina during her stay.
- Mrs Poulteney – a wealthy widow and, at the beginning of the novel, the employer of Sarah Woodruff. Hypocritical, and hypersensitive, her character fulfills the archetype of high-society villainess.
- Mary – stereotypical lower-class servant to Mrs Tranter and future wife to Sam Farrow.
- Montague – Charles Smithson's family lawyer of a firm which has been around since the eighteenth century. 2–3 years older than Charles, he helps his client in search of Sarah towards the end of the novel.

== Style and structure ==
Like many other postmodern novels, Fowles uses multiple different stylistic and structural techniques to highlight his thematic interests in The French Lieutenant's Woman. When discussing these stylistic concerns, many literary critics comment on the importance of the narrator and the narration, the intertextual references to other literary works, and the multiple endings.

=== Narration ===
Throughout the novel, the omniscient narrative voice, alongside a series of footnotes, reflect with an objective tone on a number of plot devices: the author's difficulty controlling the characters; the conventions that are expected of a "Victorian novel"; and analyses of differences in 19th-century customs and class. The narrator often returns to topics of interest to literature and scholarship from the period, like the theories of Charles Darwin and Charles Lyell, the radical politics of Karl Marx, and the works of Matthew Arnold, Alfred Tennyson and Thomas Hardy.

Through a metafictional and metahistorical voice, the contemporary, postmodern narrator questions the role of the author and the historian in thinking about the past. In her article discussing the use of paratext, or the contextualizing text printed in the book such as the footnotes and epigraphs, Deborah Bowen argues that the novel's paratext forces the reader, as in other postmodern works, to rethink the importance of such peripheral material that in other contexts will get overlooked in light of preference for the main text. Instead of nicely complementing the main plot and adding meaning, these paratextual elements can distract from the effectiveness of the novel and challenge the authority of the narrative voice.

=== Intertextuality ===
Beyond the narrator intervening and emphasizing particular interpretations of the text, the book's metafictional approach often relies on intertextual references to provide further commentary. In the epigraphs for each chapter, the book gestures towards a number of important 19th-century texts and ideas. Partially, references to other texts act in "ironic play", parodied by how the novel emulates other Victorian conventions throughout the text. Linda Hutcheon describes the works of William Thackeray, George Eliot, Charles Dickens, Froude, and Thomas Hardy as direct inspirations for this parody.

In his discussion of science and religion in the novel, John Glendening notes that both character commentary on Darwin's publications along with the epigraphs mentioning those works as direct contributors to the novel's emphasis on science superseding religion. Similarly, by quoting Marx with the first epigraph, along with multiple subsequent epigraphs, the novel directs thematic attention towards the socio-economics issues within the novel. Deborah Bowen describes literary critics struggling to find readings of the epigraphs that explore the themes of the novel, and argues that the poor relationship between the epigraphs and the text "disperses the authority of the narrative voice, thus destroying his power to speak as a moralist." For Bowen, the epigraphs support the satire of Victorian fiction conventions in the novel.

=== Multiple endings ===
Often critics will comment on the novel's multiple endings. Each offers a possible ending for Charles's pursuit of Sarah: the first ends with Charles married to Ernestina, the second with a successful reestablishment of a relationship with Sarah, and the third with Charles cast back into the world without a partner. Michelle Phillips Buchberger discusses these endings as a demonstration of "Fowles's rejection of a narrow mimesis" of reality; rather Fowles presents this multiplicity of endings to highlight the role of the author in plot choices.

It is not enough to suggest that the novel with its multiple endings is a mere experiment with the narrative form. "There is something more in it," as Mandal puts it, "an impasse that resists any straightforward resolution to the story." After all, the form of a narrative is determined by its content. It is Sarah Woodruff "the content of whose character produces multiple and contradictory possibilities" for the narrative.

== Themes ==
Though a bestseller, the novel has also received significant scrutiny by literary critics. Especially during the 1960s and 70s, a novel with great popularity and significant academic scrutiny is unusual; in literary study, the canon and its academic defenders often focused on "high literary" works that didn't have large popular followings. In her study of postmodernism, Linda Hutcheon described The French Lieutenant's Woman's binary of popular and academic interest as a paradox similar to the postmodern thematic binaries produced within the novel's content. Because of its prominence since publication, the novel has received a variety of different academic re-examinations in light of numerous critical and thematic approaches. Some of the most popular concerns for the novel are its discussion of gender, especially questioning claims by Fowles that it is a feminist novel, its engagement with metafictional and metahistorical concepts, and its treatment of science and religion.

=== Gender ===
The novel creates a number of binaries between men and women. Michelle Phillips Buchberger argues that The French Lieutenant's Woman, along with The Collector and The Magus, portrays a fundamental binary between the male and female characters: the female characters act as an elite set of "creators" or "educated, visionary, and predominantly female" characters who provide the facilitation for evolution "in existential terms" of the male "'collectors', whose traits are present in all of Fowles's flawed male protagonists." Though acknowledging such binaries in the role of the characters, critic Alice Ferrebe does not treat these binaries as necessary thematic elements. Rather, the binaries demonstrate what she calls a gendered "scopic politics", or a politics created by a gaze (not dissimilar from the "male gaze" noticed in cinema studies), that constructs an artificial gender binary within Fowles's early novels (as opposed to a multiplicity of socially constructed genders). For Ferrebe, this binary creates a tension, especially with Sarah, who becomes a violently fetishised and objectified "other", differentiated from the male characters like Charles.

==== Feminist novel ====
A number of critics have treated the work as a feminist novel, while others have debated whether it offers a sufficiently transformative perspective on women. The novel's narrator demonstrates and proclaims a feminist approach to women: Sarah is presented as a more liberated and independently willed woman as compared to the other model female characters, such as Ernestina and her aunt. In a 1985 interview by Jan Relf, Fowles declared himself a "feminist".

Magali Cornier Michael criticises this reading of the text, saying that the novel's overwhelming reliance on male perspectives on women and feminism prevents the novel from meeting feminist objectives. Similarly, Michelle Phillips Buchberger argues that The French Lieutenant's Woman, along with Fowles's two earlier novels The Collector (1963) and The Magus (1965), proclaimed a "pseudo-feminism" while advocating some feminist ideas; but, she says, they are permeated by a "fetishism [of women that] perpetuates the idea of woman as 'other'". Alice Ferrebe also notes that, despite Fowles's attempts to critique masculine values, his novels remain male fantasies demonstrative of the "compromises and contradictions" created by the gendered situation in which he was writing. Other literary critics, such as William Palmer, Peter Conradi, Bruce Woodcock and Pamela Cooper, have also critiqued Fowles's claims to a feminist perspective and representation. (Note: Michelle Phillips Buchberger cites the following in her discussion of the debate: William J. Palmer, The Fiction of John Fowles: Tradition, Art, and the Loneliness of Selfhood (Columbia: University of Missouri Press, 1974), p. 75; Peter Conradi, John Fowles (London:Methuen, 1982), p. 91; Bruce Woodcock, Male Mythologies (Brighton:Harvester, 1984), p. 15; and a discussion of Cooper's criticism in 'An Unholy Inquisition: John Fowles and Dianne Vipond (1995)', repr. in John Fowles, Wormholes: Essays and Occasional Writings, ed. by Jan Relf (New York: Henry Holt, 1998), pp. 365–84.)

Fowles's presentation of Sarah, one of the most enigmatic female characters in literary history, is also psychoanalytically informed. Fowles himself was interested in the psychology of men and women. The enigma of femininity, myth of masculinity, and impossibility of man-woman relationship are some of the crucial themes. Through Sarah's deliberate spreading of lies about herself and her relationship with Charles, Fowles brilliantly brings about the various aspects of femininity that has the potential to authenticate, threaten, and expose the vanity of the male subjects.

=== Metafiction, historiography and metahistory ===
In her important study of postmodernity and its poetics in literature, Linda Hucheon describes this novel as definitive of a genre she calls "historiographic metafiction". She defines this postmodern genre as "well-known and popular novels which are both intensely self-reflexive yet paradoxically also lay claim to historical events and personages." Typically postmodern, this genre of fiction blends the creation of imagined narratives with critique on the various modes in which we create knowledge, such as history and literature. Important to her discussion of the genre's post-modern style, The French Lieutenant's Woman's self-reflexive narration bridges different discourses that usually remain separated, such as academic history, literary criticism, philosophy and literature.

The text's representations of the past introduce anachronistic perspectives on the time and the characters. For example, in her queer studies-based article, "Historical Romance, Gender and Heterosexuality", Lisa Fletcher argues that The French Lieutenant's Woman, by relying on a "good love story" as the central means of representing the past, projects a contemporary hetero-normative sexuality on the history of Victorian England. For Fletcher, Fowles's paradoxical treatment of Sarah as both a Victorian character and as a desirable "modern woman," through feminist gestures and sexual tension between Charles and Sarah, confines the historical set characters and their experience to stereotypical heterosexual romance. Fletcher believes that overall the text creates a stereotypical and limited perspective on the past, essentially "heterosexualising the passage of (and relationship to) history".

=== Science and religion ===
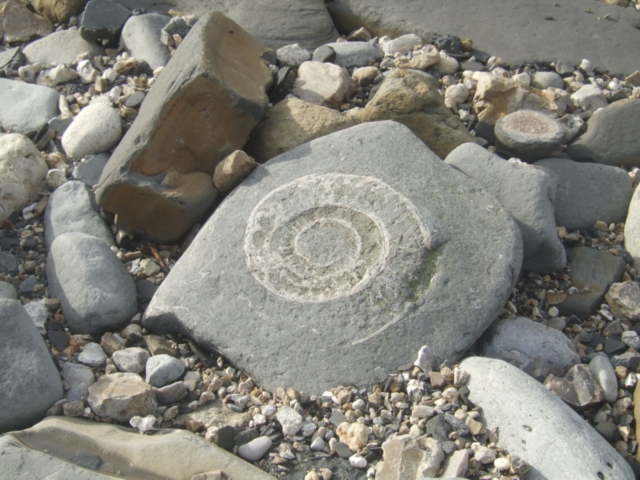
Ammonite fossils on the beach near Lyme Regis. The narrator often reflects on Smithson's fascination with science and natural history, while referring to the fossils found near Lyme Regis

Emphasis on a conflicted relationship between science and religion frequently occurs in both historical studies of Victorian history and Neo-Victorian novels. In his chapter on The French Lieutenant's Woman in his book, Evolution and the Uncrucified Jesus, John Glendening argues that Fowles's novel is one of the first neo-Victorian novels to handle the dynamic created between science and religion in Victorian identity. Glendening notes that more generally "Christian ideas and conventions become appropriated in the service of a secularist and extensional version of truth."

Glendening says that Fowles uses commentary on Darwinism "to comment on characters and their experience and to forward a view of natural and human reality opposed to Christian doctrine, and, within limits amenable to existentialist philosophy. " In general, Glendening sees ideas of science and religion as central to the personal and social identities that develop within the novel, but creating symbolically conflictual binaries. He suggests that Fowles manoeuvres these conflictual forces to favour an existential self-revelation exhibited through the main character of Smithson, leading to a conclusion that "the freedom implicit in accepting alienation should be exercised in overcoming it."

== Contemporary reception ==
The novel received mixed critical attention at its initial publication. Critics focused both praise and critique on its style, plot and approach to metafiction and metahistory. The following samples those responses: (Note: For a more complete listing of reviews see The French Lieutenant's Woman, University of Illinois's database on 20th-Century American Bestsellers. Many of the reviews are not readily available online nor digitized by major academic databases.)

The New York Times November 1969 review by Christopher Lehmann-Haupt warned readers to "be certain there's only one log on the fire. If, unhappily, you lack the fireplace by which this book should be read, set an alarm clock." Lehmann-Haupt found the book to begin as "irresistibly novelistic that he has disguised it as a Victorian romance," yet the metafictional construction by the end positively "explodes all the assumptions of our Victorian sensibilities." Time magazine's November 1969 review described the novel as "resourceful and penetrating talent at work on that archaic form." In March 1970, the magazine American Libraries named the novel as one of the "Notable Books of 1969," calling it "A successful blending of two worlds as the author writes in modern terminology of the Victorian era."

Not all of the reviews were positive; for example, Roger Sale in The Hudson Review largely criticized the novel, saying, "At times it seems that the commentary is not so bad and the novel awful, but at others Fowles makes the novel almost work and the comments are embarrassingly vulgar." Ultimately, the reviewer concluded that the novel was "stumbling and gauche and much much too long, but curiously attractive too."

== Publication history ==
The novel has been reprinted in numerous editions and translated into many languages: Taiwanese, Danish, Dutch, Arabic, Finnish, Hungarian, Italian, Norwegian, Portuguese, Chinese, German, Russian, Polish, and Spanish. The novel was originally published in 1969 by Little Brown and Company in both Boston and Toronto. The novel has also been published in a number of English editions from different publishers, represented in the following list (with publication date in parentheses):

- Associated Reprinting Co. (1969)
- Cape (June 1969)
- International Collectors Library (1969)
- Jonathan Cape (1969)
- New American Library of Canada (1969)
- Penguin (1969)
- Triad Granada (1969)
- Trinity Press (1969)
- New American Library (1970)
- Penguin (December 1970)
- London World Books (1971)
- Panther (1971)
- Triad Granada (1977)
- Franklin Library (Privately Printed, 1979)
- NAL/Dutton (Oct. 1981)
- New York American Library (1981)
- Penguin (Oct. 1981)
- Pan Books in association with Jonathan Cape (1987)
- New American Library (1989)
- Soho Press, Inc. (1990)
- William A. Thomas Braille Bookstore (1990)
- Hodder & Stoughton Educational (1991)
- Picador (1992)
- Buccaneer Books, Inc. (1994)
- Vintage (1996)
- Back Bay Books (1998)

== Legacy ==
The general popularity of The French Lieutenant's Woman has inspired several responses to the novel, most notably other authors' work and adaptation into film and theatre.

=== Literary response ===
The most prominent response to the novel is A. S. Byatt's 1990 Booker Prize-winning novel Possession. She describes her novel as deliberately responding to the model of postmodern metafiction that critics highlight in The French Lieutenant's Woman. Byatt described her motivation for responding in her essays in On Histories and Stories, saying:

Fowles has said that the nineteenth-century narrator was assuming the omniscience of a god. I think rather the opposite is the case—this kind of fictive narrator can creep closer to the feelings and inner life of characters—as well as providing a Greek chorus—than any first-person mimicry. In 'Possession' I used this kind of narrator deliberately three times in the historical narrative—always to tell what the historians and biographers of my fiction never discovered, always to heighten the reader's imaginative entry into the world of the text.

=== Adaptation ===
The novel was adapted as a 1981 film, written by playwright Harold Pinter and directed by Karel Reisz. The film starred Meryl Streep and Jeremy Irons. It was nominated for five Academy Awards, including Best Adapted Screenplay for Pinter. Pinter was nominated for a Golden Globe for best script and the work as a whole in the category Best Motion Picture – Drama.

During 2006, a stage version by Mark Healy toured the UK. Also in 2006, BBC Radio 4 produced an adaptation of two one-hour episodes, starring John Hurt as the narrator.
