= The Magus (novel) =

1965 novel by John Fowles

- First edition
- Author: John Fowles
- Cover artist: Tom Adams
- Language: English
- Publisher: Jonathan Cape (UK)
- Publication date: 1965 (revised version 1977)
- Publication place: United Kingdom

The Magus (1965) is a postmodern novel by British author John Fowles, telling the story of Nicholas Urfe, a young British graduate who is teaching English on a small Greek island. Urfe becomes embroiled in the psychological illusions of a master trickster, which become increasingly dark and serious. Considered an example of metafiction, it was the first novel written by Fowles but his third book to be published. A revised edition was published in 1977.

In 1999, The Magus was ranked on both lists of Modern Library 100 Best Novels, reaching number 93 on the editors' list and number 71 on the readers' list. In 2003, the novel was listed at number 67 on the BBC's survey The Big Read.

== Background ==
The Magus was the first book John Fowles wrote, but his third to be published, after The Collector (1963) and The Aristos (1964). He started writing it in the 1950s, under the original title of The Godgame. He based it partly on his experiences on the Greek island of Spetses, where he taught English for two years at the Anargyrios School. He worked on it for twelve years before its publication in 1965. Despite critical and commercial success, he continued to rework it, publishing a final revision in 1977.

== Plot summary ==
The story reflects the perspective of Nicholas Urfe, a young Oxford graduate and aspiring poet. After graduation, he briefly works as a teacher at a small school, but becomes bored and decides to leave England. While looking for another job, Nicholas takes up with Alison Kelly, a young Australian woman he meets at a party in London. He goes on to accept a post teaching English at the Lord Byron School on the Greek island of Phraxos. After beginning his new post, he becomes bored, depressed, disillusioned and overwhelmed by his life on the Mediterranean island; Nicholas struggles with loneliness and contemplates suicide. While habitually wandering around the island, he stumbles upon an estate and soon meets its owner, Maurice Conchis, a wealthy Greek recluse. They develop a sort of friendship, and Conchis slowly reveals that he may have collaborated with the Nazis during World War II.

Nicholas is gradually drawn into Conchis's psychological games, his paradoxical views on life, his mysterious persona and his eccentric masques. At first, Nicholas takes these machinations of Conchis, what the novel terms the "godgame", to be a joke, but they grow more elaborate and intense. Nicholas loses his ability to determine what is real and what is artifice. Against his will and knowledge, he becomes a performer in the godgame. Eventually, Nicholas realises that the re-enactments of the Nazi occupation, the absurd playlets after Sade, and the obscene parodies of Greek myths are not about Conchis's life, but his own.

== Characters ==
=== Main ===
- Nicholas Urfe – the protagonist, a 26-year-old Englishman who goes to Greece to teach English and one day stumbles upon "the waiting room"
- Alison Kelly – Nicholas' recent Australian girlfriend, whom he abandons to go to Greece
- Maurice Conchis – a wealthy intellectual who is a main player in the masques
- Lily Montgomery / Julie Holmes / Vanessa Maxwell – a young woman who is involved in the masques and with whom Nicholas falls in love

=== Other ===
- Joe – a young black American, involved in the masques
- Maria – Conchis's maid
- Demetriades – a fellow teacher at the school
- Lily de Seitas (older) – Lily's mother
- Rose de Seitas – Lily's identical twin sister
- Benji de Seitas – the younger brother of the Seitas twins
- Kemp – an unmarried woman who rents Nicholas a room in London
- Jojo – a young girl whom Nicholas pays to accompany him

=== Story characters ===
- de Deukans
- Gustav Nygaard
- Henrik Nygaard
- Anton
- Wimmel

== Ending ==
The book ends indeterminately. Fowles received many letters from readers wanting to know which of the two apparently possible outcomes occur. He refused to answer the question conclusively, however, sometimes changing his answer to suit the inquirer. The novel ends quoting the refrain of the Pervigilium Veneris, an anonymous work of fourth-century Latin poetry, which has been taken as indicating the possible preferred resolution of the ending's ambiguity.

== Literary precedents ==
John Fowles wrote an article about his experiences in the island of Spetses and their influence on the book. He acknowledged some literary works as influences in his foreword to the 1977 revised edition of The Magus, including Alain-Fournier's Le Grand Meaulnes, for showing a secret hidden world to be explored, and Richard Jefferies's Bevis (1882), for projecting a very different world. In the revised edition, Fowles referred to a "Miss Havisham", a likely reference to the character Miss Havisham in Charles Dickens's Great Expectations (1861).

== Critical reception ==
- "A major work of mounting tensions in which the human mind is the guinea-pig ... Mr. Fowles has taken a big swing at a difficult subject and his hits ... are on the bull's eye" (Sunday Telegraph)
- "A deliciously toothsome celebration of wanton story-telling ... Before one quite realises what is happening, one finds oneself no less avid for meanings and no less starving amid a plethora of clues than is Nicholas himself" (Sunday Times)
- "A splendidly sustained piece of mystification ... such as could otherwise only have been devised by a literary team fielding the Marquis de Sade, Arthur Edward Waite, James George Frazer, Gurdjieff, Madame Blavatsky, C. G. Jung, Aleister Crowley, and Franz Kafka" (Financial Times)
- The novel was featured on the Modern Library List of Best 20th-Century Novels: It ranked as No. 71 on the Readers' List and No. 93 on the Critics' List of the top 100 novels.

== Adaptations ==
The novel was adapted for film with a screenplay by Fowles, directed by Guy Green, and released in 1968. It stars Michael Caine as Nicholas Urfe, Anthony Quinn as Maurice Conchis, Anna Karina as Alison, Candice Bergen as Lily / Julie, and Julian Glover as Anton. It was filmed on the island of Mallorca. The adaptation generally was considered a failure as a film. When Peter Sellers was asked whether he would make changes in his life if he had the opportunity to do it all over again, he jokingly replied, "I would do everything exactly the same except I wouldn't see The Magus." (Note: Peter Sellers' comment is frequently misattributed to Woody Allen.) Caine said that it was one of the worst films in which he had been involved because no one knew what it was about. Despite the critical failure, the film was nominated for a BAFTA Award for Best Cinematography.

BBC Radio 4 broadcast in 2016 a dramatisation by Adrian Hodges, with Charles Dance in the role of Conchis.

In 2020, a new television miniseries adaptation of The Magus was announced to be in development at Neal Street Productions, with Johan Renck being looked at to direct based on a screenplay written by Tom Edge.
