= Claire de Duras =

French writer (1777–1828)

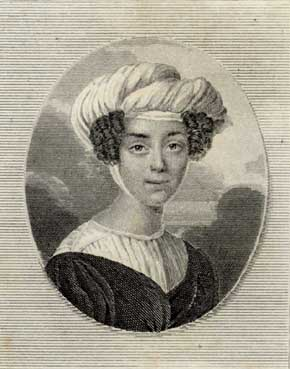
- Portrait, c. 1840
- Born: 23 March 1777; Brest, Brittany, Kingdom of France
- Died: 16 January 1828 (aged 50); Nice, Kingdom of France
- Occupation: Novelist
- Writing career
- Notable works: Ourika, Edouard and Olivier

Claire, Duchess of Duras (pronounced "Dura", née de Kersaint; 23 March 1777 – 16 January 1828) was a French writer best known for her 1823 novel called Ourika, which examines issues of racial and sexual equality, and which inspired the 1969 John Fowles novel The French Lieutenant's Woman.

== Biography ==
Claire de Duras left her native France for London during the French Revolution in 1789, and returned to France in 1808 as the Duchess of Duras. She maintained a famous literary salon in post-Revolutionary Paris and was the close friend of Chateaubriand, who she had met while in exile in London, and who helped her to publish her books.

Ourika was published anonymously in 1823, one of five novels Claire de Duras had written during the previous year; only two of them were published during her lifetime. The three novellas that she did publish were only done so in order to prevent any possible plagiarism.

Claire de Duras treated complex and controversial subjects, primarily dealing with oppressed/marginalized characters. She explored many fundamental principles of the French Revolution, and touched upon the intellectual debates of the Age of Enlightenment, particularly the equality of all men—and women. In holding with these subjects, tragedy is a common theme. For a long time she was seen as the writer of small and unimportant sentimental novels, but recent criticism has revealed her works to be treasure troves of postmodern identity theory.

== Works ==
=== Published during her life ===
- Olivier, ou le secret (1822)
- Ourika (1823)
- Edouard (1825)

=== Published posthumously ===
- Pensées de Louis XIV, extraites de ses ouvrages et de ses lettres manuscrites. Thoughts of Louis XIV: extracts of his writings. (1827)

=== Unfinished works ===
- Le Moine du Saint-Bernard. The Monk of Saint-Bernard.
- Les Mémoires de Sophie. Sophie's Memoirs.
