= Shanghai Surprise =

1986 British/American adventure comedy film directed by Jim Goddard

- Theatrical release poster
- Directed by: Jim Goddard
- Written by: John Kohn; Robert Bentley
- Based on: Faraday's Flowers novel by Tony Kenrick
- Produced by: John Kohn
- Starring: Sean Penn; Madonna
- Cinematography: Ernie Vincze
- Edited by: Ralph Sheldon
- Music by: George Harrison; Michael Kamen
- Production company: HandMade Films
- Distributed by: Columbia-Cannon-Warner Distributors (United Kingdom); MGM Entertainment Co. (United States)
- Release date: 29 August 1986 (United States)
- Running time: 97 minutes
- Countries: United Kingdom; United States
- Budget: $15 million
- Box office: $2.3 million (US)

Shanghai Surprise is a 1986 adventure comedy film directed by Jim Goddard and starring then-newlyweds Sean Penn and Madonna. The screenplay was adapted by John Kohn and Robert Bentley from Tony Kenrick's 1978 novel Faraday's Flowers. A mixture of romance and suspense, the film follow two very different Americans whose lives become intertwined through a dangerous mission involving a missing shipment of opium.

Produced by George Harrison's HandMade Films and distributed by Metro-Goldwyn-Mayer, Harrison himself appears in the film as a night club singer, and he wrote and recorded five original songs for the soundtrack. The film was a critical and commercial failure, and an official soundtrack album was never released.

== Plot summary ==
In 1937, a wealthy trader named Walter Faraday, an opium smuggler, tries to escape the brutal Chinese military officers headed by the corrupt Mei Gan. When seized by Gan, Faraday leads him to dig through all of his possessions in his money belt, which leads to an exploding booby-trap that sees Han's hands blown off while Faraday and his travelling companion Willie try to escape. Willie escapes but Faraday is believed to have perished in the waters.

In 1938, Glendon Wasey, an American traveling salesman, tries to make his living through selling novelty neckties that glow in the dark. Unfortunately, business is not easy to come by, and he wishes to leave the city to go back to America, preferably with enough money to make a better life for himself. Gloria Tatlock, a young American nurse working with a Salvation Army mission in China, is working alongside a missionary named Mr. Burns in search of a valuable shipment of opium for medical purposes, which starts with a man named Wu Ch’En She. Gloria realizes that she needs someone who understands Shanghai’s criminal underworld and can communicate with the people involved in these dangerous dealings. She therefore approaches Glendon and presents a mission of finding Wu as the supposed father of a soldier.

Glendon initially refuses the venture when offered due to not wanting to risk his life for what seems to offer little reward. However, Gloria convinces him that his knowledge of the city and resourceful negotiation skills could make him quite useful, which leads him to agree to take up a partnership with her. As Gloria and Glendon begin their investigation, they encounter several people who claim to possess information about the missing opium, ranging from Justin Kronk, a European adventurer that they meet after an encounter with cricket-fighting. Stating that Wu Ch'En She has numerous gambling debts, Kronk leads them to Ho Chong, a friend in the insurance business that apparently knows the location of Wu. When he leads them to a fishing vessel, Ho pushes Glendon and Gloria into a cargo hold that is filled with live fish, which mainly leads them with a putrid smell. Kronk returns to tell Glendon that Wu had no sons, which leads Glendon to confront Gloria of the truth. Mr. Burns tries to deliver an apology with a ticket to Los Angeles and a bit of cash while Gloria invites Glendon to a duck dinner. Kronk happens to be at the same place for dinner, which in turns leads them to meet Tuttle, a distinguished journalist. Tuttle tells them about five crates of premium opium that he saw on the night of Faraday's death and presents the possibility of meeting Faraday's concubine in "China Doll". Faraday spends a night with China Doll but gets no actual information.

The situation becomes more dangerous when Glendon is kidnapped by men posing as police officers. The men are connected to Mei Gan (now wearing porcelain hands). Glendon is interrogated and tortured because his captors believe he possesses information that could lead them to the shipment. When Glendon eventually returns to his hotel room, Gloria sees his injuries and helps care for him; the danger they have experienced together brings them closer together.

Gloria nevertheless remains determined to discover the truth, and she encourages Glendon to return to China Doll in the hope that another conversation will produce the information they need. Glendon initially refuses because he has already suffered enough and does not want to risk being captured again. Gloria seduces him to try and get him to go with the idea but afterward she experiences guilt and releases him from his obligation to continue helping her. Even so, Glendon decides to remain involved, suggesting that his feelings for Gloria have begun to influence his decisions more strongly than his desire to escape. Glendon subsequently reveals that China Doll had arranged for a man named Wu Ch’En She to sell the missing opium to a businessman called Joe Go. Gloria and Glendon approach Joe Go in the hope of recovering the shipment, but they discover that the crates supposedly containing opium have been replaced with ordinary building bricks, apart from a small quantity of the drug. Joe Go agrees to help them contact Wu Ch’En She, and the resulting investigation produces a mysterious clue referring to something called the Last Phoenix. Unable to understand its significance, the protagonists consult Willie Tuttle and attempt to determine how the clue relates to Faraday, the missing opium, and the various people pursuing them.

Their investigation also brings them back into contact with Justin Kronk, who continues to offer information in exchange for money. Through the information provided by Kronk and Willie, Gloria and Glendon begin to understand that the criminal intrigue involves more than the opium shipment. Mei Gan is connected to the theft of valuable treasures from China Doll’s ancestral tomb, and Walter Faraday had recovered those treasures. China Doll eventually gives Gloria and Glendon precious jewels that they can use to purchase the opium. With Mei Gan and his men pursuing them down a waterfront, confusion strikes when an officer takes Glendon's money belt looking for the jewels only to accidentally detonate an explosive device. Glendon eventually retrieves the jewels from a hiding place in a rowboat. However, Joe Go steals the jewels and attempts to escape, forcing Gloria and Glendon to pursue him. They overcome his bodyguard and confront him, and Gloria physically attacks Joe Go before recovering the precious stones. With the jewels recovered, she and Glendon believe they can finally return to the mission.

When Gloria and Glendon return to the mission, Mr. Burns appears pleased with their apparent success. However, Willie Tuttle and Justin Kronk arrive and demand the treasure, which soon sees the revelation that the man they believe to be Mr. Burns is actually Walter Faraday in disguise, as he survived the attack that people believed had killed him. After being rescued from the water by a fishing net, he recovered in Osaka, Japan, and eventually returned to pursue his own plans. Faraday reveals that he had selected Glendon partly because he resembled China Doll’s former lover, making him useful in the complicated scheme surrounding the jewels. Rather than rewarding Gloria and Glendon for their efforts, Faraday demands the ticket to Los Angeles that would allow Glendon to leave Shanghai. He then imprisons Gloria and Glendon in separate wicker trunks. Fortunately, the real Mr. Burns returns from Peking and frees them. Gloria and Glendon immediately pursue Faraday to a ship because they want to recover the jewels and finally put an end to the adventure. However, Faraday produces another surprise by revealing that the jewels are fake. China Doll has deceived the people pursuing her treasures, and the entire struggle to obtain and protect them has been based on a false assumption. Faraday offers to share his cabin with Gloria and Glendon so that they can return to America. Gloria, however, decides to remain in Shanghai because she is still committed to her mission and the people she wants to help. Faraday boasts that he can make Glendon rich, presenting him with a choice between material wealth and his relationship with Gloria. Glendon chooses to remain with her rather than accept Faraday’s offer. Glendon arranges for Faraday’s three wicker trunks to be returned to the dock and reunites with Gloria as the ship sails away. Faraday initially waves to them, apparently unaware of what has happened, until he discovers that his trunks have been left behind. Meanwhile, Glendon opens one of the trunks on the dock and discovers opium hidden beneath his stock of glow-in-the-dark neckties.

== Cast ==
- Sean Penn as Glendon Wasey
- Madonna as Gloria Tatlock
- Paul Freeman as Walter Faraday
- Richard Griffiths as Willie Tuttle
- Philip Sayer as Justin Kronk
- Clyde Kusatsu as Joe Go
- Lim Kay Tong as Mei Gan
- Sonserai Lee as China Doll
- Victor Wong as Ho Chong
- Professor Toru Tanaka as Yanagani San
- Michael Aldridge as Mr. Burns
- Sarah Lam as China Doll's Maid
- George She as Wu Ch'En She
- Won Gam Bor as Rickshaw King
- To Chee Kan as China Doll's Boatman
- George Harrison as Night Club Singer

== Production ==
In November 1985, it was announced Madonna and then newlywed husband Sean Penn had signed to do Shanghai Surprise with principal photography set to begin in Macau and Hong Kong by January 1986. Due to the high profile status of the stars' real life relationship, by the second day of filming the production was often inundated with photographers to the point Penn demanded the film's publicist be fired and replaced. According to co-star Richard Griffiths:

Sean Penn always had an ace of trumps up his sleeve. He'd play his ace of trumps, win the trick and then put it back up his sleeve and then when the next drama was played, he'd pull out his ace of trumps again. And the ace of trumps was this: in Madonna's contract, and Penn was very sore about this because he saw himself as the star of the movie, there was a clause and it said Madonna shall have the casting approval of her leading man. In other words, "If you don't do what I say," says Penn, "I quit, and if I quit, she won't agree with any other guy playing my part because, hey, she's my wife, and you don't have a movie, so go and fuck yourselves. Do as I say or I'm out of here." Boy, did he know how to manipulate that situation with Madonna.

Finance was raised from HandMade Films which previously had limited itself to making lower budgeted British movies. Filmink called it "an attempt to make an old ‘30s style Hollywood movie: not a bad idea, just with inappropriate stars, director and script."

The press frenzy led Madonna and Penn to isolate themselves from the production when not on set, which created tension with the crew. "Sean and Madonna weren’t being very nice to the crew," George Harrison later explained. "It's hard work, dragging equipment round places where it's freezing cold for hours—and, while she's in a warm trailer, they're trying to drink a cup of tea to keep warm, and a little 'Hello, good morning, how are you?' goes a long way under those circumstances." Their discontent led some crew members to spread gossip to the tabloid reporters on the scene, further inflaming the hostility between the press and the stars.

Harrison even reluctantly flew to Hong Kong to try and smooth things over between the cast, crew, and press. Jim Goddard's initial cut of the film was rejected by executives at MGM, and Goddard’s attempts to find alternative distribution were fruitless resulting in his return to MGM. Prior to release both Madonna and Penn attempted to distance themselves from the film with the two insisting their likenesses be removed from the tie-in novel from Viking Press a few days before it was set to hit printers.

== Marketing ==
Shanghai Surprise debuted following a "great deal of hype and promotion" in the United Kingdom, including being hyped on the music television series The Tube. In the United States, however, as The Atlanta Journal-Constitution reported in October 1986, "The movie opened so poorly in its first wave of playdates (late August in the Northeast and Midwest) that MGM has made severe cuts in its marketing budget. One MGM exec was quoted in the trades as saying this was necessary because 'the interest in the film has been non-existent.'"

== Soundtrack ==
The film featured 5 original songs by George Harrison: "Shanghai Surprise" (duet with Vicki Brown), "Someplace Else", "Breath Away from Heaven", "Zig Zag", and "Hottest Gong in Town". While an official soundtrack album for the film was never released, the title track was issued as a promotional single in 1986.

New versions of both "Breath Away from Heaven" and "Someplace Else" were recorded for inclusion on Harrison's 1987 album Cloud Nine, while an alternate mix of "Zig Zag" (with the notable addition of backing vocals) was released as the B-side of Harrison's "When We Was Fab" single in early 1988.

The song "Hottest Gong in Town" was included on the EP that came with the 1992 book Songs by George Harrison 2. The title song and the single mix of "Zig Zag" were also added to the 2004 re-release of Cloud Nine as bonus tracks.

== Critical reception ==
The film received mixed critical response during its pre-release. On the review aggregator website Rotten Tomatoes, 20% of 10 critics' reviews are positive, with an average rating of 3.9/10. Metacritic, which uses a weighted average, assigned the film a score of 16 out of 100, based on 12 critics, indicating "overwhelming dislike".

Bill Cosford of the Miami Herald, granting it 1 star out of 4, wrote, "In Shanghai Surprise, as you may have heard, almost everything is just a bit off. Though widely anticipated as a musical, Shanghai Surprise is actually a kind of miniaturization of Raiders of the Lost Ark / Indiana Jones and the Temple of Doom, with a feisty heroine (Madonna) in the vain [sic] of Rita Hayworth in The Lady From Shanghai, and a roguish adventure hero (Sean Penn) as well as a pop-sprinkled score (partly the work of George Harrison). ... There's a plot here, involving Madonna's quest to find a load of hijacked opium for conversion to morphine to help the troops fighting the Japanese. Penn, though he spends his big scene panting in a brothel, will save the day. But the film was conceived and executed as a star vehicle. Wrong stars, wrong roles, not much happening here. And for George Harrison and his Handmade Films, the first big bust." The Philadelphia Inquirer also gave it only 1 star: "Shanghai Surprise is so dismally scripted and directed that no one could redeem it ... an atmospheric, handsomely shot and, sadly, utterly empty piece of work." The Lexington Herald-Leader called it "a turkey": "This film is bad. The acting is terrible. The hackneyed screenplay traffics in stereotype and yuk-yuk jokes. And the point is non-existent." The San Diego Union said, "In its campy nostalgia for old adventure films, Shanghai Surprise is cloddish. There's something rotten at the core about a movie that would recycle lines like "That's mighty white of you." Even sadder is the realization that some of the old cornball movies are still fresher, more alive, than this regurgitation."

The Philadelphia Daily News faulted the casting as well as the script: "The ever-important spirit is missing as Mr. and Mrs. Penn wrestle with old gags that are beyond their ken. It's not entirely their fault though: They've been given no characters to play. Much of Shanghai Surprise might have worked if they at least were permitted to play themselves—a punk rocker and punk actor at large in an alien movie world." The Chicago Sun-Times, awarding the movie half a star, complained of its "warped attitudes toward women," adding, "It's hard to know for whom this wretch of a film was made. Idiotic dialogue should turn off the adults, teens will be disappointed by their rock heroine and kids shouldn't even be watching." Film professor Michal Conford, of Ryerson University, reviewed the film for the San Jose Mercury News with another half-star rating, saying sardonically, "Shanghai Surprise stars Madonna and Sean Penn together for the first time and has songs by George Harrison. That is the most positive sentence that can be written about the film, now playing locally. MGM must have suspected – the company tried to open the film in places like Iowa to avoid getting slaughtered. Nice try. ... The film is supposed to be a shaggy dog adventure. ... Shaggy, no. Dog, yes."

== Awards and nominations ==
Award	Category	Recipient	Result
Golden Raspberry Awards	Worst Picture	Shanghai Surprise	Nominated
Golden Raspberry Awards	Worst Screenplay	John Kohn and Robert Bentley	Nominated
Golden Raspberry Awards	Worst Actress	Madonna	Won
Golden Raspberry Awards	Worst Actor	Sean Penn	Nominated
Golden Raspberry Awards	Worst Director	Jim Goddard	Nominated
Golden Raspberry Awards	Worst Original Song	"Shanghai Surprise" by George Harrison	Nominated
Stinkers Bad Movie Awards	Worst Picture	Shanghai Surprise	Nominated

== Home media ==
The home video was released by Vestron Video. The company paid $5 million for distribution rights. The VHS debuted on Billboard's Top Videocassette Sales at number 28 and peaked at number 25 in the issue dated April 4, 1987. With a retail price of $79.98, the videocassette sold only 100,000 copies in the United States as of 1987, causing Vestron a $1 million loss.

== See also ==
- Gigli
