= Indeterminacy (literature) =

Indeterminacy in literature is a situation in which components of a text require the reader to make their own decisions about the text's meaning. This can occur if the text's ending does not provide full closure and there are still questions to be answered, or when "the language is such that the author’s original intention is not known". Baldick further describes the concept as "a principle of uncertainty invoked to deny the existence of any final or determinate meaning that could bring to an end the play of meaning between the elements of a text". Therefore, indeterminacy is the belief that it is not possible to decide entirely what a word means when used in a certain circumstance, so the meaning of the whole text must remain open to interpretation.

== Indeterminacy is not ambiguity ==
In literature, indeterminacy is sometimes confused with the idea of ambiguity, as the two are very alike. However, as opposed to ambiguity, indeterminacy is "applied by its practitioners not only to literature but also to the interpretation of texts". Nevertheless, the presence of indeterminacy does not mean that decisions about meaning cannot be made at all, but only that there will be no final official judgement or approval on any individual interpretation. Furthermore, the presence of indeterminacy does not result in all interpretations being of equal legitimacy; instead it indicates that all meanings drawn from an indeterminate text are "partial and provisional, and that what we write about it itself as a text, is open to further interpretation".

== Indeterminacy and the reader's imagination ==
A slightly different approach to indeterminacy is the idea that the reader's "concretization is left to a large extent to... imagination". This becomes clear when comparing narrative fiction; which is commonly indeterminate, to film; the very nature of which often precludes indeterminacy. Stanzel quotes John Fowles in regards to the indeterminacy of narrative as an advantage. "There are hundreds of things a novel can do that a cinema can never do. The cinema can’t digress, above all it can’t exclude... you’ve got to have a certain chair, certain clothes, certain decor. In a novel... you don’t have to "set up" the whole screen. The delight of writing novels is what you can leave out on each page, in each sentence".

Furthermore, McHale highlights the "partial indeterminacy, the 'gappiness' of fictional objects, including fictional characters", by pointing out that no depiction of a fictional character or object could ever be as absolute as what actual human beings consider themselves and their objects to be. "It is always as if a beam of light were illuminating a part of a region, the remainder of which disappears in an indeterminate cloud".

== Deconstruction theory ==
This literary meaning of indeterminacy is often associated with deconstruction, the post-structuralist theory propounded by Jacques Derrida, and is best described as "a philosophically sceptical approach to the possibility of coherent meaning in language". However, Royle quotes Derrida as saying "I do not believe I have ever spoken of 'indeterminacy', whether in regard to 'meaning' or anything else... deconstruction should never lead either to relativism or to any sort of indeterminism".

== Indeterminacy theory ==
According to indeterminacy theory, all texts can have the "multiplicity of possible interpretations of given textual elements." So, indeterminacy is not always purposeful. However, while some indeterminacy in literary fiction is permanent; the gap will never be filled or closed; other areas of indeterminacy are temporary, and deliberately planted by the author with the intention of leaving a gap that the reader themself can fill, by the "process of realizing or concretising the text".
