= The Tree (book) =

1979 book by John Fowles

- First edition
- Author: John Fowles
- Language: English
- Pages: 122
- ISBN: 978-0-002-16609-6

The Tree is an autobiographical book by John Fowles.

In it, Fowles discusses the essence of nature and its relation to the creative arts, especially writing, which he describes as “siblings, branches of the one tree.”
