= Wormholes: Essays and Occasional Writings =

1998 book by John Fowles

First edition (publ. Henry Holt)

Wormholes: Essays and Occasional Writings (ISBN 0-8050-5867-2) is a book containing writings from four decades by the English author John Fowles. It was published in 1998. Most of the contents are short, non-fiction pieces that had been written for various purposes since 1963, including forewords to other authors' books, and pieces written for science journals or other periodicals.
