= Ourika =

Novel by Claire de Duras

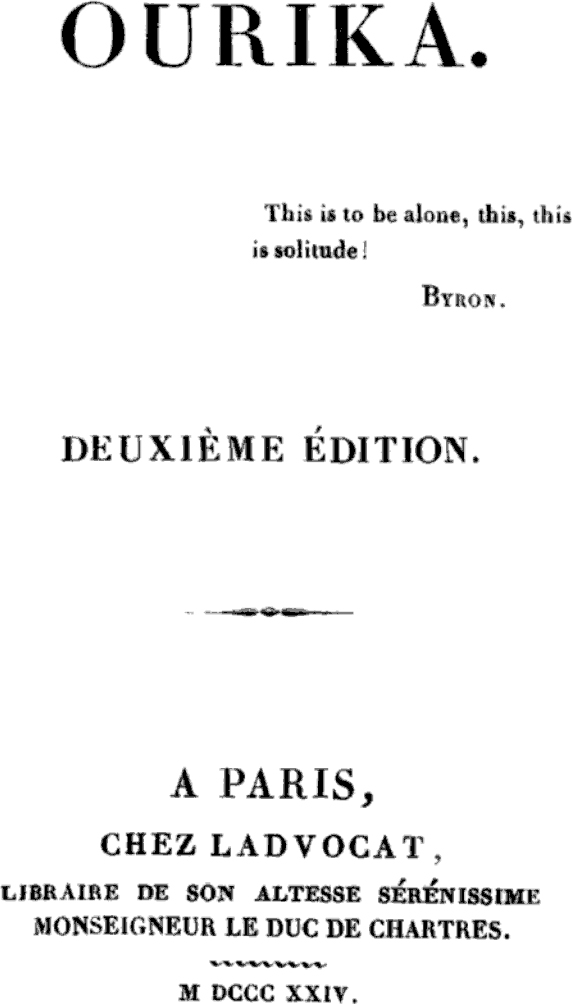
- Title page from the second edition of Ourika (1824)
- Author: Claire de Duras
- Language: French
- Genre: Novel
- Publication date: 1823, 1824
- Publication place: France
- Pages: 45
- ISBN: 978-2-07-042433-7

Ourika is an 1823 novel by Claire de Duras, originally published anonymously.

Cover of Ourika

== Overview ==
Ourika is a story based on the life of a woman who was purchased as a child (in or around 1786) by Chevalier Stanislas de Boufflers, the colonial administrator of Senegal, and given as a gift to his maternal uncle Charles Juste de Beauvau, 2nd Prince of Craon. The real Ourika died in 1799 at the age of sixteen and was buried in Saint-Germain-en-Laye.

The novel marks a critical point in European literature. It is the first French text to depict a black woman character with a complex psychology. It is the first text to create "an articulate and educated black woman narrator," and "one of the most compelling works of short fiction in French and a startlingly modern commentary on race."

The novella covers the time before, during, and after the French Revolution and addresses key themes of race, nationality, exile, interracial love and kinship and the psychological adjustment to these. It signifies an important movement from traditional notions of race, nationality, and kinship towards the identity politics of today.

== History of the Ourika story, and different versions ==
In his journal, the Chevalier de Boufflers wrote of the purchase of the slave girl whose life would later be documented in Duras' novella: "I am buying at the moment a little Négresse of two or three years of age in order to send her to Madame de Duchess of Orléans... I feel myself brought to tears in thinking that this poor child has been sold to me like a little lamb." This girl provided lively conversation in the salons of nineteenth-century Paris, where Boufflers's letters were read, and these 'lively' conversations provided fodder for Claire de Duras's fictional Ourika.

The life of the real-life Ourika was a subject of much conversation in nineteenth century Paris, and spawned many poems, plays and novels in the popular press, including La Nouvelle Ourika (1824) and La Négresse (1826). The most famous of these is the novel Ourika by Claire de Duras. Duras's story is based on a few bare bones of historical facts, and was committed (reluctantly) to the page by Claire de Duras. She only did so to prevent any possible plagiarism, as she recounted the story—with much acclaim—to those attending her salon in post-Revolutionary Paris. She was the close friend of François-René de Chateaubriand, whom she had met in exile in London, and who helped her in publishing this story among others.

== Summary ==
The novel opens from the point of view of a doctor, who has been called to treat a dying young nun in a convent. This nun is a young black woman called Ourika, who is dying of "melancholia." As an effort to cure her, he asks her to tell him her story. Ourika begins by relating how she was "saved" from the slave trade as an infant by the governor of Senegal, and brought back to Paris as a gift for Madame de B. She is raised well, according to the standards for white Parisian girls of high society-she is taught to sing by the best voice coaches, instructed in painting by a famous artist, is well-read and is accomplished in many languages. Ourika also says that prior to a critical moment in her life at the age of twelve, she had no consciousness of her race or any other racial barriers: "I reached the age of twelve without it once occurring to me that there was a way of being happy beside mine. I didn't regret being black. I was told that I was an angel. There was nothing to warn me that the color of my skin might be a disadvantage."

In order to show off Ourika's talents, Mme de B. organizes a ball to show Ourika off, in which she dances as "Africa." Ourika does well in her dance, but later overhears an earth-shattering conversation. A friend of Mme de B., an unnamed Marquise, declares that Mme de B. has done Ourika a disgrace by raising her above her station, which means that Ourika will now be forever unhappy. The Marquise announces, to Ourika's shock, “What kind of man would marry a Negress?"

Ourika is then struck by the realization of her skin color, and undergoes a psychological reaction akin to Frantz Fanon's account of racial awareness in Peau Noire, Masques Blancs (Black Skin, White Masks), which has been termed "racial melancholia", "whereby racial identification becomes a site of ongoing trauma that is supported by loss and compensation.". She begins to avoid mirrors, covering up her skin with gloves and hats, and begins to see her hands as "monkey's paws," going so far as to say that "this skin color of mine seemed to me like the brand of shame."

Ourika also falls in love with Charles, Madame de B.'s grandson. However, he does not realize she is in love with him, and ends up marrying a young heiress, Anaïs de Thèmines, whose family have been killed by the French Revolutionaries. This drives her into depression, or "melancholy," that is so deep that she almost dies. She finally ends up retreating to the convent, where the doctor meets her, and eventually dies at the end of Autumn.

== Principal characters ==
- The doctor, also the narrator
- Ourika
- Madame de B., Ourika's adopted mother
- Charles, the grandson of Madame de B.
- La marquise de..., a friend of Madame de B.
- Anaïs de Thémines, Charles' wife

== Key themes ==
- Race
  - Ourika provides a contemporary, literary account of race as a lived experience in the turn of the 19th century in colonial France. Race is perceived as an independent factor in identity. Despite her education and privileges bestowed by Madame de B., others cannot look beyond Ourika's skin color. The latter grapples with her racial identity and looks for acceptance throughout the majority of the novella. She cannot marry a white man in a similar class as her own and joins a convent in the hopes to find acceptance in God before her untimely death. While Madame de B. may have saved Ourika from slavery, she did not save Ourika from another pernicious adversity: that of being Black in France during this period. French colonial society could not accept or integrate a Black woman into its highest positions.
  - Black skin is viewed as antithetical to beauty in the novel which reflects de Duras' and society's own perceptions at the time. Ourika tries to hide the color of her skin as much as possible, viewing her Black hands as resembling those of “monkeys” and believing the color of her skin made her so ugly that she could barely be considered human, as a last attempt to be accepted in elite society. Paradoxically, Ourika, the first complex, Black figure in Western literature, was written by Claire de Duras, a noble White woman. While Madame de Duras could not have known what it was like to be a Black woman at the time, Claire de Duras lived in exile during the Revolution and is often thought to have felt profoundly ugly and ostracized. Madame de Duras might have used Ourika as an example of a mask she felt she was wearing. Ourika was ostracized and painted as ugly for her race, de Duras for her class. The ugliness viewed inherently in Black skin at the time is seen also in the reception of the novel, with Stendhal stating he found that “for a Négresse, the child was pretty” and Mme de Boigne saying Ourika “was as beautiful as her ebony skin permitted”.
- Melancholia
- Exile
- Confession
- Passing (racial identity)
- Tragedy
- Romanticism
- Gender equality

== See also ==
- The French Lieutenant's Woman

== Bibliography ==
- Chilcoat, Michelle. "Confinement, the Family Institution, and the Case of Claire de Duras’ Ourika". Vol. 38, No. 3. (Fall 1998), 6–16.
- Dimauro, Damon. "Ourika, or Galatea Reverts to Stone". Nineteenth-Century French Studies. (Spr–Sum 2000). 187.
- Kadish, Doris Y.; Massardier-Kenney, Françoise et al., Translating slavery: gender and race in French women's writing, 1783–1823, Kent, Kent State University Press, 1994.
- Kadish, Doris Y., Ourika’s Three Versions: A Comparison, Translating Slavery: Gender and Race in French Women’s Writing, 1783–1823, Éd. Françoise Massardier-Kenney, Préf. Albrecht Neubert, Gregory M. Shreve, Kent, Kent State UP, 1994, xiv, p. 217-28.
- Koh, Adeline "The uses of racial melancholia in colonial education: Reading Ourika and Saleh: A Prince of Malaya as cautionary tales " Journal of Postcolonial Writing Volume 48, Issue 4, 2012http://www.tandfonline.com/doi/abs/10.1080/17449855.2011.616341
- O'Connell, David. "Ourika: Black Face, White Mask". The French Review. Special Issue. No. 6, Studies on the French Novel (Spring 1974), 47–56.
- de Raedt, Thérèse. “Representations of the Real-Life Ourika.” In Approaches to Teaching Duras's Ourika, MLA Approaches to Teaching World Literature. (New York: Modern Language Association of America, 2009)
- Rouillard, Linda Marie. "The Black Galatea: Claire de Duras’ Ourika". Nineteenth-Century French Studies, Vol. 32, No. 3 & 4. (Spring–Summer 2004), 207–22.
- Warburton, Eileen. "Ashes, Ashes, We All Fall Down: Ourika, Cinderella, and The French Lieutenant's Woman". Twentieth Century Literature. Vol. 42, No. 1, John Fowles Issue (Spring 1996), 165–186.
- Weil, Kari. "Romantic exile and the melancholia of identification". differences: A Journal of Feminist Cultural Studies. Vol. 7, No. 2, (Summer 1995). 111–27.
