= The Ebony Tower =

1974 book by John Fowles

- First edition (UK)
- Author: John Fowles
- Cover artist: Pisanello, fragment of fresco in Ducal Palace, Mantua
- Language: English
- Publisher: Jonathan Cape (UK); Little Brown (US)
- Publication date: 1974
- Publication place: United Kingdom
- Media type: Print
- Pages: 192
- ISBN: 0-224-01045-X

The Ebony Tower (1974) by John Fowles is a collection of five novellas and short stories with interlacing themes: The Ebony Tower, Eliduc, Poor Koko, The Enigma and The Cloud.

== Plot synopses ==
=== The Ebony Tower ===
Henry Breasley is an elderly painter whose secluded retirement is invaded by a brash young artist commissioned to write a biographical study of the great man. Breasley shares his home with two young English girls, both former art students, Diana and Anne. In this strange ménage, David is left in no doubt about his host's views on modern abstract art. However, he is puzzled by the old man's relationship with the girls, especially when he himself is attracted to Diana.

=== Eliduc ===
Eliduc, the shortest tale in the book, is a translation of a Breton lai by Marie de France, in which a hero goes into exile in England, leaving his wife behind. While in exile, he falls for the daughter of a local king.

=== Poor Koko ===
An elderly writer has borrowed a country cottage from friends in London. On the first night of his stay, the house is burgled. Poor Koko tells of his encounter with the burglar.

=== The Enigma ===
John Fielding, British Member of Parliament, disappears without trace. Was foul play involved, or did he fake his own disappearance? The case presents few clues for the police officer in charge.

=== The Cloud ===
A seemingly idyllic picnic in the south of France for a group of English family and friends hides deeper, troubled undercurrents.

== Television adaptations ==
=== The Ebony Tower (1984) ===
The Ebony Tower
- Based on: The Ebony Tower by John Fowles
- Screenplay by: John Mortimer
- Directed by: Robert Knights
- Starring: Laurence Olivier; Roger Rees; Greta Scacchi
- Original language: English

Production
- Running time: 80 min

Original release
- Release: 1984

The Ebony Tower is a 1984 television film adaptation of the novelette by John Fowles. Directed by Robert Knights it stars Laurence Olivier in the role of the elderly painter.

Cast

- Laurence Olivier as Henry Breasley
- Roger Rees as David Williams
- Greta Scacchi as Diana, "The Mouse"
- Toyah Willcox as Anne, "The Freak"
- Georgina Melville as Beth Williams
- Yves Brainville as Jean-Pierre
- Denise Bailly as Mathilde
- Vincent Lindon

Trivia

- Olivier was recovering from pleurisy during filming.
- Filmed in Limoges, Haute-Vienne in France.

DVD and VHS

The film was released on VHS during the 1990s. It has been released on DVD format and is included on the Laurence Olivier Presents Collection and The Laurence Olivier Centenary Collection.

=== The Enigma (1980) ===
The Ebony Tower
- Also known as: The Enigma
- Based on: The Enigma by John Fowles
- Written by: Malcolm Bradbury
- Directed by: Robert Knights
- Original language: English

Original release
- Release: 1980

The Enigma is a 1980 television adaptation of the novelette by John Fowles, produced as part of BBC2's playhouse series. It was also directed by Robert Knights.

Cast

- Neville Barber as chairman of Labour meeting
- Philip Bowen as Peter Fielding
- Melinda Clancy as Caroline Fielding
- Shelley Crowhurst as Francesca Fielding
- Andrew Downie as Drummond
- John Franklyn-Robbins as John Marcus Fielding
- Lyndam Gregory as Peter's flatmate
- Nigel Hawthorne as Fenton
- Ursula Howells as Mrs. Fielding
- Barbara Kellerman as Isobel Dodgson
- Elizabeth Spriggs as Miss Parsons
- Michael Thomas as Michael Jennings
- David Troughton as Andrews
- Raymond Westwell as Len Bargate
- Douglas Wilmer as Henry Wild
