= The Magus (film) =

1968 British film by Guy Green

- Theatrical release poster
- Directed by: Guy Green
- Written by: John Fowles
- Based on: The Magus by John Fowles
- Produced by: Jud Kinberg; John Kohn
- Starring: Michael Caine; Anthony Quinn; Candice Bergen; Anna Karina; Julian Glover
- Cinematography: Billy Williams
- Edited by: Max Benedict
- Music by: John Dankworth
- Production company: Blazer Films
- Distributed by: 20th Century Fox
- Release dates: 10 December 1968 (USA); 13 November 1969 (UK)
- Running time: 117 minutes
- Country: United Kingdom
- Language: English
- Budget: $3,775,000
- Box office: $1 million (US/ Canada rental)

The Magus is a 1968 British mystery film directed by Guy Green and starring Michael Caine, Anthony Quinn, Candice Bergen and Anna Karina. The screenplay was written by John Fowles based on his 1965 novel of the same name.

== Plot ==
Nicholas Urfe is a young Englishman, who has taken a teaching position on the Greek island of Phraxos, following the previous instructor's suicide. For Nicholas, it is a chance to sample different surroundings and an opportunity to escape from a relationship with his emotionally unstable lover Anne.

At first, Nicholas' life on Phraxos is uneventful but peaceful. However, he soon becomes involved with a reclusive man named Maurice Conchis, who owns an estate on the opposite side of the island, and has a beautiful young woman named Lily as his companion. On being introduced to the couple, Nicholas' life begins to unravel, and he tries to find out who the mysterious Conchis really is.

Is he a psychiatrist? A film producer? A Nazi sympathiser? Or a magician who controls the lives and destinies of those around him? Nicholas quickly begins to lose his grip on reality, sinking deeper into Conchis' game.

During visits to Conchis' estate, Nicholas has a series of experiences which gradually become more unexpected and bizarre. Many are related to (or are re-enactments of) past events from Conchis' life. Ultimately, these events begin happening off the estate as well at unexpected times and places, raising questions as to how much power and control Conchis can actually exercise over others' lives.

The story climaxes with a "trial" directed by Conchis, with Nicholas (and many others) participating.

The final scene, which may be interpreted as a coda, concerns Nicholas' relationship with Anne, and whether or not it will continue.

== Cast ==
- Michael Caine as Nicholas Urfe
- Anthony Quinn as Maurice Conchis
- Candice Bergen as Lily
- Anna Karina as Anne
- Paul Stassino as Meli
- Julian Glover as Anton
- Takis Emmanuel as Kapetan
- George Pastell as Andreas and the priest
- Danièle Noël as Soula

The film's writer John Fowles has a minor role as a boat captain.

== Production ==
Guy Green liked the book but not the script. He worked on the script with Fowles. Green said he disagreed with the producers over interpretation – they wanted more of a thriller, he wanted something more Fellini-like. The director claims Richard Zanuck had just seen Blow Up, which had an abrupt ending, and had them remove the last reel from The Magus. Green felt the film would have been more successful with the original ending.

== Reception ==
=== Critical ===
The Monthly Film Bulletin wrote: "Although John Fowles has tackled the unenviable task of adapting his own Chinese box novel very sensibly by simply lopping off several of its endless concentric circles, something has gone very wrong with the film. Both acting and direction are competent enough in an uninspired, workmanlike way, but this doesn't prevent the film from being faintly ludicrous some of the time and painfully unexciting all of the time. Perhaps the trouble is simply that it is difficult to become involved in all the spiritual twists and torments when Nicholas Urfe, would-be poet saddled with a symbolically prominent copy of Seven Types of Ambiguity, is presented in this simplified script as just another of those shallow, urbane and faintly cynical Michael Caine heroes. Whether they are ghosts, actors, psychiatrists or magicians, Conchis and his crew, one feels, are wasting their time on singularly intractable material."

Fowles was extremely disappointed with the film, although he had written the screenplay himself, and laid most of the blame on director Guy Green.

The film retains a cult following.

=== Audience ===
When Peter Sellers was asked whether he would make changes in his life if he had the opportunity to do it all over again, he jokingly replied, "I would do everything exactly the same except I wouldn't see The Magus." (Note: Peter Sellers' comment is frequently misattributed to Woody Allen.)

=== Box office ===
According to Fox records, the film required $7 million in rentals to break even, and by 11 December 1970, it had made $2,450,000, resulting in a loss to the studio.

== Accolades ==
It was nominated for a BAFTA Award for Best Cinematography (Billy Williams).

== Home media ==
The film was released to DVD by 20th Century Fox on 16 October 2006, marking the first time that it has ever been available on home video in the U.S.
