= Mantissa (novel) =

Novel by John Fowles

- First UK edition
- Author: John Fowles
- Cover artist: Pablo Picasso
- Language: English
- Publisher: Jonathan Cape (UK); Little, Brown (US)
- Publication date: Aug 1982
- Publication place: United Kingdom
- Media type: Print
- Pages: 192
- ISBN: 0-224-02938-X

Mantissa is a novel by British author John Fowles published in 1982. It consists entirely of a presumably imaginary dialogue in a writer's head, between himself and an embodiment of the Muse Erato, after he wakes amnesiac in a hospital bed.

== Critical reception ==
Mantissa was Fowles' only novel to receive generally negative reviews. The New York Times called it "a surprisingly tedious novel," asserting that it was little more than Fowles' response to critics that he felt misunderstood his work. The Boston Globe named it "an idiotic story." Time magazine, in a more positive review, asserted that the book consists of a sort of intellectual play between Fowles and the reader, or by Fowles at the expense of all reading. The Pittsburgh Post-Gazette likewise identified the book as intellectually playful but found the dialogue tiresome.

Dave Langford reviewed Mantissa for White Dwarf #55, and stated that "Although packed with allegory about what creativity/inspiration actually is, the book is wonderfully, unexpectedly funny. An in-joke or so too many, but great stuff."
