= The Aristos =

Book by John Fowles

First edition (Little Brown, 1964)

The Aristos: A Self-Portrait in Ideas is a 1964 collection of several hundred philosophical aphorisms by English author John Fowles. A revised edition, without the subtitle, which was shorter but also incorporated new material, was published in hardcover in 1968 and in paperback in 1970. The principal theme in The Aristos is that most achievements, most great steps forward, have come from individuals.

In the book's Appendix, Fowles included what he called the "main fragments" of Heraclitus's doctrine.
