= John Kohn =

American writer and producer

- Born: 1925; New York City, New York, U.S.
- Died: May 4, 2002 (aged 76 or 77); Sherman Oaks, California, U.S.
- Occupations: Movie producer and writer film executive
- Spouse: Barbara Jaffe
- Children: 2
- Relatives: Sam Jaffe (father-in-law)

John Kohn (1925 – May 4, 2002) was an American writer and producer who also served as head of production for EMI (1979–1983).

== Biography ==
Kohn was born to a Jewish family, the son of a New York rabbi. During World War II, he flew 36 missions as a tail gunner in the United States Army Air Forces. After his service, he graduated with a B.A. from UCLA.

== Personal life ==
In 1953, he married Barbara Jaffe, the daughter of agent-producer Sam Jaffe; they had two children, director Peter Kohn (who is divorced from actress Amanda Pays) and Susan Kohn Levine. He died on March 4, 2002, of cancer at his home in Sherman Oaks, California.

== Filmography ==
- Gruen Guild Theatre (1951) – writer
- Front Page Detective (1951) – writer
- Rebound (1952) – writer
- Campbell Summer Soundstage (1952) – writer
- Biff Baker, U.S.A (1952) – writer
- The Dennis Day Show (1954) – writer
- Father Knows Best (1955) – writer
- It's a Great Life (1955) – writer
- The Adventures of Hiram Holiday (1955) – writer
- The Ford Television Theatre (1957) – writer
- The Ann Sothern Show (1958–1959) – writer
- Bachelor Father (1959) – writer
- The Many Loves of Dobie Gillis (1960) – writer
- Reach for Glory (1962) – producer / writer
- Siege of the Saxons (1963) – writer
- The Collector (1965) – writer
- Caprice (1967) – writer
- Fathom (1967) – producer
- The Magus (1968) – producer
- Figures in a Landscape (1970) – producer
- The Strange Vengeance of Rosalie (1972) – producer
- The Wrath of God (1972) – producer
- Theatre of Blood (1973) – producer
- Golden Girl (1979) – writer
- Racing with the Moon (1984) – producer
- Shanghai Surprise (1986) – producer

== Awards ==
Awards	Title	Movie	Year	Result
Academy Awards	Best Writing, Screenplay Based on Material from Another Medium	The Collector	1966	Nominee
Golden Globes	Best Screenplay	The Collector	1966	Nominee
Writers Guild of America Awards	Best Written American Drama	The Collector	1966	Nominee
