= Daniel Martin (novel) =

1977 novel by John Fowles

- First edition (UK)
- Author: John Fowles
- Cover artist: Mon Mohan
- Language: English
- Genre: Bildungsroman
- Publisher: Jonathan Cape (UK); Little Brown (US)
- Publication date: Oct 1977
- Publication place: United Kingdom
- Media type: Print
- Pages: 704
- ISBN: 0-224-01490-0
- OCLC: 3427330
- Dewey Decimal: 823/.9/14
- LC Class: PZ4.F788 Dan PR6056.O85

Daniel Martin is a bildungsroman novel written by English author John Fowles and first published in 1977 by Jonathan Cape. It follows the life of the eponymous protagonist, using both first and third person voices, whilst employing a variety of literary techniques such as multiple narratives and flashback. The author suggests that the book is concerned with "Englishness – what it is like to be English in the late 20th century."

== Plot summary ==
Dan Martin is a playwright and Hollywood screenwriter who returns to his native England when a friend from his time at university asks to see him before he dies. With flashbacks to his childhood in the 1940s and his Oxford undergraduate days, a tale of frustrated love emerges. The dying man, Anthony, asks Daniel to look after Anthony's wife Jane. Daniel had married Jane's sister Nell, despite loving Jane and having spent one night with her many years previously.

While in England, Daniel improves relations with his daughter, Caro, and with Nell, from whom he is now divorced. Daniel and Jane go on a cruise in Egypt and visit Syria and Lebanon, and the two fall in love again. Daniel breaks up with his much younger girlfriend, and the two lovers are reunited at the end of the book.

== Main characters in Daniel Martin ==
Character	Information
Dan Martin	The protagonist
Nell	Daniel's ex-wife
Jane	Daniel's lifetime love, Nell's sister
Anthony	Jane's husband, Daniel's friend
Caro	Daniel's daughter by Nell
Jenny	Daniel's younger girlfriend

== Writing ==
In summer 1969 Fowles commenced work on The Two Englishmen, which he renamed Futility, and which then became Daniel Martin. A second draft was begun in April 1974 and he worked on the novel consistently throughout 1974/75. Final amendments were made in March 1977.

== Major themes ==
The novel can be seen as autobiographical. John Fowles stated in an interview: "You are every character you write. In Daniel Martin, where I describe myself travelling all over America, I probably revealed more of myself than anywhere else."

In exploring the relationships between the main characters, Fowles takes the chance to expand upon such topics as aesthetics, philosophy of cinema, archaeology, imperialism, and the differences between Britain and the United States.

John Gardner references Daniel Martin many times in the first half of On Moral Fiction; it is to him a reflection of John Fowles's valid opinion regarding art—namely, that true art ought to instruct. The same notion was Gardner's central thesis in On Moral Fiction.

== Literary significance and reception ==
Robert McCrum states "It was the American literary press that saluted Daniel Martin; the English critics who murdered it." Writing in The New York Times William H. Pritchard wrote "This new, long, ambitious novel must be judged [Fowles's] best piece of work to date and is a masterly fictional creation, dense with fact."
