= The Collector =

1963 thriller novel by John Fowles

- First edition
- Author: John Fowles
- Cover artist: Tom Adams
- Language: English
- Genre: Thriller
- Publisher: Jonathan Cape (UK); Little, Brown and Company (U.S.)
- Publication date: May 1963
- Publication place: United Kingdom
- Media type: Print (hardcover)
- Pages: 283 (first edition)
- OCLC: 472571199

The Collector is a 1963 thriller novel by English author John Fowles, in his literary debut. Its plot follows a lonely young man who kidnaps a female art student in London and holds her captive in the cellar of his rural farmhouse. Divided in two sections, the novel contains both the perspective of the captor, Frederick, and that of Miranda, the captive. The portion of the novel told from Miranda's perspective is presented in epistolary form.

Fowles wrote the novel between November 1960 and March 1962. It was adapted into an Academy Award–nominated feature film of the same name in 1965 starring Terence Stamp and Samantha Eggar.

== Plot ==
The novel is about a lonely young man, Frederick Clegg, who works as a clerk in a city hall and collects butterflies in his spare time. The first part of the novel tells the story from his point of view.

Clegg is obsessed with Miranda Grey, a middle-class art student at the Slade School of Fine Art. He admires her from a distance but is unable to make any contact with her because he is socially underdeveloped. One day, he wins a large prize in the football pools. He quits his job and buys an isolated house in Sussex near Lewes. He feels lonely, however, and wants to be with Miranda. Unable to make any normal contact, Clegg decides to add her to his "collection" of pretty, preserved objects, in the hope that if he keeps her captive long enough, she will grow to love him.

After careful preparation, he kidnaps Miranda by drugging her with chloroform and locks her up in the cellar of his house. He is convinced that Miranda will start to love him after some time. However, when she wakes up, she confronts him with his actions. Clegg is embarrassed and promises to let her go after a month. He promises to show her "every respect", pledging not to sexually molest her and to shower her with gifts and the comforts of home, on one condition: she can't leave the cellar.

The second part of the novel is narrated by Miranda in the form of fragments from a diary that she keeps during her captivity. Miranda reminisces over her previous life throughout this section of the novel, and many of her diary entries are written either to her sister or to a man named G.P., whom she respected and admired as an artist. Miranda reveals that G.P. ultimately fell in love with her and consequently severed all contact with her.

At first, Miranda thinks that Clegg has sexual motives for abducting her; but, as his true character begins to be revealed, she realises that this is not true. She begins to pity her captor, comparing him to Caliban in Shakespeare's play The Tempest because of his hopeless obsession with her. Clegg tells Miranda that his first name is Ferdinand (eventual winner of Miranda's affections in The Tempest).

Miranda tries to escape several times, but Clegg stops her. She also tries to seduce him to convince him to let her go. The only result is that the impotent Clegg becomes confused and angry. As Clegg repeatedly refuses to release her, she begins to fantasise about killing him. After a failed attempt to do so, Miranda enters a period of self-loathing. She decides that to kill Clegg would lower her to his level. She refrains from any further attempts to do so. Before she can try to escape again, she becomes seriously ill and dies.

The third part of the novel is narrated by Clegg. At first, he wants to commit suicide after he finds Miranda dead; but, after he reads in her diary that she never loved him, he decides that he is not responsible for what happened to her and is better off without her. He buries her corpse in the garden. The book ends with his thinking of kidnapping another girl.

== Analysis and themes ==
=== Social class ===
Literary scholars have noted the theme of class in the British caste system as a prominent point of interest in the novel. Critic Hayden Carruth noted that Fowles is preoccupied with "reshuffling classes under British socialism", evoked in the differences in social background between the characters of the working-class Frederick, and Miranda, a member of the bourgeoisie.

Some scholars have compared the power struggle between Frederick and Miranda as exemplifying the Hegelian "master–slave dialectic", and that each exerts power over the other—both physically and psychologically—despite their differences in social background. Pamela Cooper writes in her book The Fictions of John Fowles: Power, Creativity, Femininity, that The Collector "dramatizes the clash between a socially entrenched, wealthy middle class and an underprivileged but upwardly mobile working or lower middle class." Additionally, Cooper views the novel as a Gothic-inspired work presenting this class struggle "with an insistence on the tedium of Miranda's ordeal."

=== Absurdism and irony ===
In the Journal of Modern Literature, scholar Shyamal Bagchee attests that the novel possesses an "ironic-absurdist view" and contains a significant number of events which are hinged purely on chance. He compares the world of the novel to the "tragically absurd worlds" of Franz Kafka and Samuel Beckett's novels. "The world of The Collector, especially towards the end, is not our world; however, it is similar to the view of the world we have in our darkest hours."

Bagchee notes the novel's greatest irony being that Miranda seals her own fate by continually being herself, and that through "each successive escape attempt she alienates and embitters Clegg the more." Despite this, Bagchee views The Collector as a "horrifying" and "ironic" love story:

"Once we recognize the basic ironic-absurdist thrust of the rhetoric of the book, we will see that love is an entirely appropriate theme of the story—because it is so paradoxical... Fowles takes great care to show that Clegg is like no other person we know. It takes Miranda a long time get rid of her successive stereotyped views of Clegg as a rapist, an extortionist, or a psychotic. She admits to an uneasy admiration of him, and this baffles her. Clegg defies stereotypical description."

Furthermore, Bagchee notes Miranda's evolution as a character only while in captivity as another paradox in the novel: "Her growing up is finally futile; she learns the true meaning of existentialist choice when, in fact, she has very limited actual choice. And she learns to understand herself and her life when, in effect, that life has come to a standstill." Cooper, who interprets the novel as a critique of "masculine sexual idealization", notes another paradox in the way the novel connects both photography and collecting as "twin obscenities in order to show the erotic worshipper, with his puritanical hatred of 'the crude animal thing' and his belief in his 'own higher aspirations', is himself prey to the desires he tries to reject."

=== Narrative technique ===
Bagchee notes that the divided narrative structure of the novel—which first presents the perspective of Frederick, followed by that of Miranda (the latter divulged in epistolary form via scattered diary entries)—has the characters mirroring each other in a manner that is "richly ironic and reveals of a sombre and frightening view of life's hazards." Bagchee notes that "the two narrations frequently agree not only about physical descriptions of incidents that take place, but often also in the way two very different characters react similarly to given situations or display similar attitudes."

Scholar Katarina Držajić considers The Collector "one of the most prominent novels of the 20th century, [which] may be viewed from many interesting perspectives – as a psychological thriller, a Jungian study, a modern or postmodern piece of literature. John Fowles is well established as a master of language, using a variety of tools to convey different meanings and bring his characters closer to his reader."

== Reception ==
Alan Pryce-Jones of The New York Times wrote of the novel: "John Fowles is a very brave man. He has written a novel which depends for its effect on total acceptance by the reader. There is no room in it for the least hesitation, the smallest false note, for not only is it written in the first person singular, but its protagonist is a very special case indeed. Mr. Fowles's main skill is in his use of language. There is not a false note in his delineation of Fred." Hayden Carruth of the Press & Sun-Bulletin praised the novel as "brisk" and "professional," adding that Fowles "knows how to evoke the oblique horror of innocence as well as the direct horror of knowledge."

In 2014, Mary Andrews of The Guardian wrote that "Fowles invites us to defy his main character's excuses and read between the lines, and the facts paint a more chilling picture. Fred doesn't accidentally abduct Miranda, there's a sense that he's been leading up to this event his whole life," and deemed Frederick Clegg "one of literature's most evil characters."

== Adaptations ==
The Collector has been adapted as a film and several times as a play. It's also referred to in various songs, television episodes and books; one example is in Stephen King's book Misery, when the protagonist Paul Sheldon hopes that Annie Wilkes is not familiar with "John Fowles's first novel."

The novel was adapted as a feature film by the same name in 1965. The screenplay was by Stanley Mann and John Kohn, and it was directed by William Wyler, who turned down The Sound of Music to direct it. It starred Terence Stamp and Samantha Eggar. The 1980 Tamil-language film Moodu Pani, according to its director Balu Mahendra, is partly based on The Collector. The novel was also loosely adapted by Filipino director Mike de Leon into a film titled Bilanggo sa Dilim (Prisoner in the Dark) in 1986. The 1997 Finnish drama film Neitoperho was loosely inspired by the novel, according to the film's director.

A stage adaptation by the actor Brian McDermott (writing as David Parker) was first performed in 1971; among its earliest productions was a West End presentation at the St Martin's Theatre in 1974, with Marianne Faithfull as Miranda and Simon Williams as Clegg. Another adaptation – written, again, by an actor: Mark Healy – was first performed at Derby Playhouse in October 1998, later appearing at Sweden's Gothenburg English Studio Theatre in April 2007. Yet another adaptation, by Tim Dalgleish and Caz Tricks, was written for Bare Bones Theatre Company (of Wolverton, Milton Keynes) in 1997.

In October 2021, Suntup Editions announced a limited 1,000 editions of the novel with an introduction by Bradford Morrow and six illustrations by David Álvarez.

== Associations with serial killers ==
In several cases since the novel was published, serial killers, spree killers, kidnappers, and other criminals have claimed that The Collector was the basis, the inspiration, or the justification for their crimes.

=== Leonard Lake and Charles Ng ===
In 1985, Leonard Lake and Charles Chi-Tat Ng abducted 18-year-old Kathy Allen and later 20-year-old Brenda O'Connor. Lake is said to have been obsessed with The Collector. Lake described his plan for using the women for sex and housekeeping in a "philosophy" videotape. The two are believed to have murdered at least 25 people, including two entire families. Although Lake had committed several crimes in the Ukiah, California area, his "Operation Miranda" did not begin until after he moved to remote Wilseyville, California. The videotapes of his murders and a diary written by Lake were found buried near the bunker in Wilseyville. They revealed that Lake had named his plot Operation Miranda after the character in Fowles' book.

=== Christopher Wilder ===
Christopher Wilder, a spree/serial killer of young girls, had The Collector in his possession when he was killed by police in 1984.

=== Robert Berdella ===
In 1988, Robert Berdella held his male victims captive and photographed their torture before killing them. He claimed that the film version of The Collector had been his inspiration when he was a teenager.

== Sources ==
- Bagchee, Syhamal (1980). ""The Collector": The Paradoxical Imagination of John Fowles". Journal of Modern Literature. 8 (2). Bloomington, Indiana: Indiana University Press: 219–234. ISSN 0022-281X. JSTOR 3831229.
- Cooper, Pamela (1991). The Fictions of John Fowles: Power, Creativity, Femininity. Ottawa, Ontario: University of Ottawa Press. ISBN 978-0-776-60299-8.
- Držajić, Katarina P. (2014). "Human feelings mirrored in metaphors: The Collector by John Fowles" (PDF). Journal of Language and Cultural Education. 2 (3): 197–207. ISSN 1339-4045.
- Lee, Seungjae (2005). Otherness, Recognition and Power: The Hegelian Themes in John Fowles's The Collector (PDF) (Thesis). Athens, Georgia: University of Georgia.
