= John Fowles =

English novelist (1926–2005)

- Born: 31 March 1926; Leigh-on-Sea, Essex, England
- Died: 5 November 2005 (aged 79); Lyme Regis, Dorset, England
- Education: University of Edinburgh; New College, Oxford
- Occupations: Writer, teacher
- Writing career
- Period: 1960–2005
- Notable works: The Collector; The Magus; The French Lieutenant's Woman

John Robert Fowles (/faʊlz/; 31 March 1926 – 5 November 2005) was an English novelist, critically positioned between modernism and postmodernism. His work was influenced by Jean-Paul Sartre and Albert Camus, among others.

After leaving Oxford University, Fowles taught English at a school on the Greek island of Spetses, a sojourn that inspired The Magus (1965), an instant best-seller that was directly in tune with 1960s "hippy" anarchism and experimental philosophy. This was followed by The French Lieutenant's Woman (1969), a Victorian-era romance with a postmodern twist that was set in Lyme Regis, Dorset, where Fowles lived for much of his life. Later fictional works include The Ebony Tower (1974), Daniel Martin (1977), Mantissa (1982), and A Maggot (1985).

Fowles's books have been translated into many languages, and several have been adapted as films.

== Early life ==
=== Birth and family ===
Fowles was born in Leigh-on-Sea in Essex, England, the only son and elder child (a sister, Hazel, was born fifteen years later) of Robert John Fowles and Gladys May, née Richards. His father had trained as a lawyer—"clerking and reading in a barrister's chambers"—but worked for the family business, tobacco importer Allen & Wright, as his father Reginald had been a partner in the company; at Reginald's death, Robert was obliged to run the firm as his brother had died in the Battle of Ypres and there were young dependent half-siblings to provide for from his father's second marriage. Gladys was daughter of John Richards, a draper, and his wife Elizabeth, who was in service. They came from Cornwall to London, where John became chief buyer for a department store, and gave their daughter a "comfortable upbringing in Chelsea", but they relocated to Westcliff-on-Sea in Essex on account of the healthier climate following the 1918 Spanish flu pandemic. On returning from the First World War in bad health, having served for three years as an officer in the Honourable Artillery Company, Robert Fowles met his future wife at a Westcliff-on-Sea tennis club.

=== Education ===
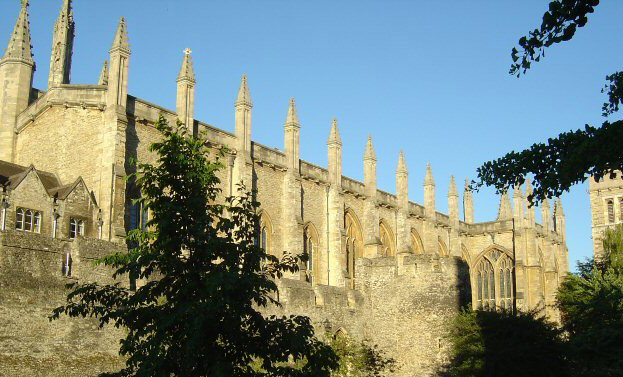
New College, Oxford, where Fowles attended university.

During his childhood, Fowles and his mother were close companions. His cousin Peggy Fowles, who was 18 years his senior, was also his close companion until John was ten. He attended Alleyn Court Preparatory School, where a maternal uncle and aunt were teachers.

In 1939, he won a place at Bedford School, where he remained a pupil until 1944. He became head boy and was an athletic standout: a member of the rugby football third team, the fives first team, and captain of the cricket team, for which he was a bowler.

After leaving Bedford School, Fowles enrolled in a Naval Short Course at the University of Edinburgh and was prepared to receive a commission in the Royal Marines. He completed his training on 8 May 1945 and was then assigned to Okehampton Camp, Devon, for two years.

After completing his military service in 1947, Fowles entered New College, Oxford, where he studied both French and German, although he stopped studying German and concentrated on French for his BA. He received the degree with second class honours in 1950. Fowles was undergoing a political transformation. Upon leaving the marines, he wrote, "I ... began to hate what I was becoming in life—a British Establishment young hopeful. I decided instead to become a sort of anarchist."

It was also at Oxford that Fowles first considered life as a writer, particularly after reading existentialists such as Jean-Paul Sartre and Albert Camus. He has also commented that the ambience of Oxford at the time, where such existentialist notions of "authenticity" and "freedom" were pervasive, influenced him. Though Fowles did not identify as an existentialist, their writing was motivated from a feeling that the world was absurd, a feeling he shared.

== Career ==
=== Teaching ===
Fowles spent his early adult life as a teacher. His first year after Oxford was spent at the University of Poitiers. At the end of the year, he received two offers: one from the French department at Winchester, the other "from a school in Greece," Fowles said: "Of course, I went against all the dictates of common sense and took the Greek job."

In 1951, Fowles became an English master at the Anargyrios and Korgialenios School of Spetses on the Peloponnesian island of Spetses (also known as Spetsai). This opened a critical period in his life, as the island was where he met his future wife. Inspired by his experiences and feelings there, he used it as the setting of his novel The Magus (1966). Fowles was happy in Greece, especially outside the school. He wrote poems that he later published, and became close to his fellow expatriates. But during 1953, he and the other masters at the school were all dismissed for trying to institute reforms, and Fowles returned to England.

On the island of Spetses, Fowles had developed a relationship with Elizabeth Christy, née Whitton, then married to another teacher, Roy Christy. That marriage was already ending because of Fowles. Although they returned to England at the same time, they were no longer in each other's company. It was during this period that Fowles began drafting The Magus.

His separation from Elizabeth did not last long. On 2 April 1957, they were married. Fowles became stepfather to Elizabeth's daughter from her first marriage, Anna. For nearly ten years, he taught English as a foreign language to students from other countries at St. Godric's College, an all-girls establishment in Hampstead, London.

=== Literary career ===
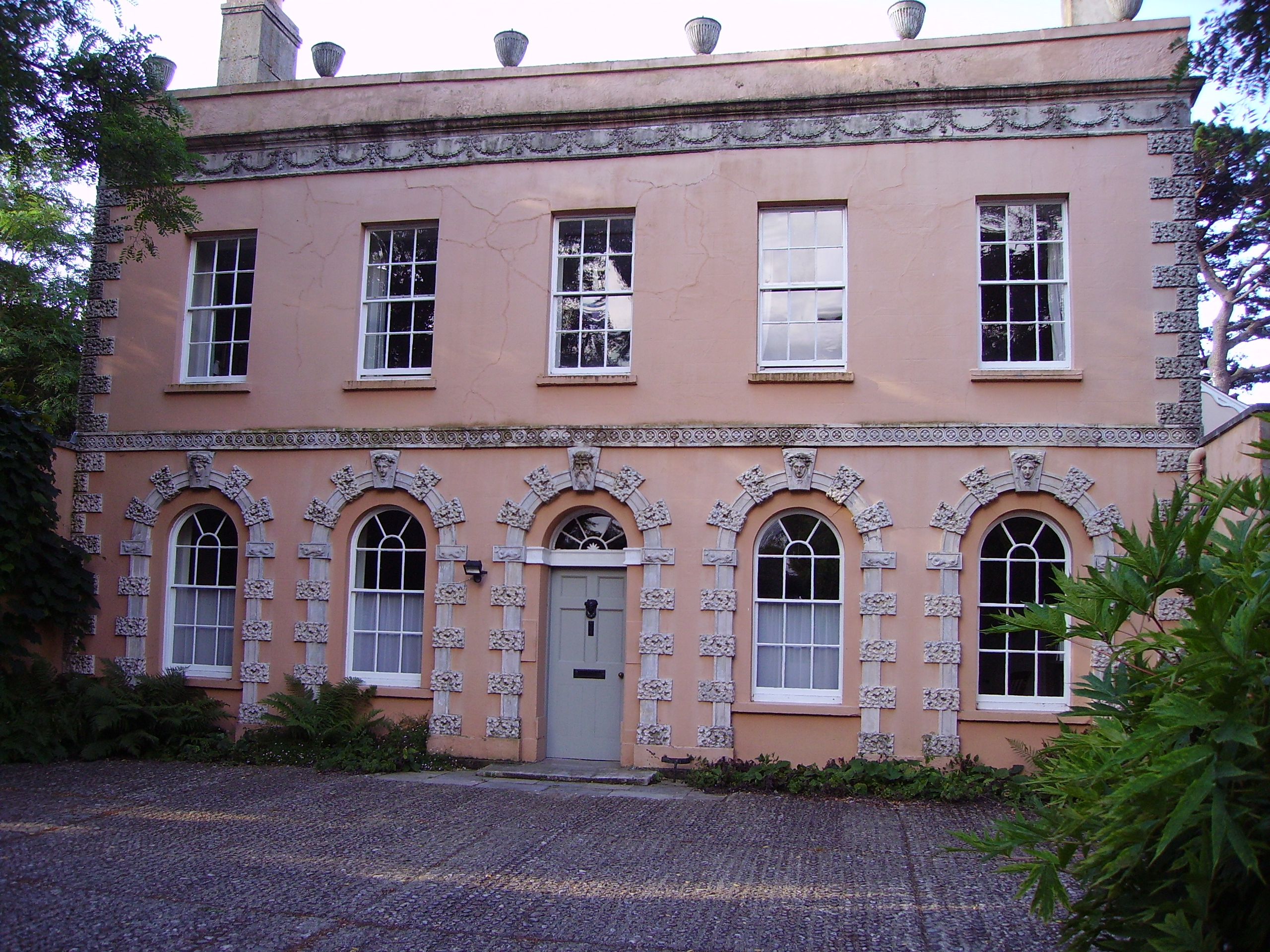
Belmont – Fowles's home in Lyme Regis

In late 1960, though he had already drafted The Magus, Fowles began working on The Collector. He finished his first draft of The Collector in a month, but spent more than a year making revisions before showing it to his agent. Michael S. Howard, the publisher at Jonathan Cape, was enthusiastic about the manuscript. The book was published in 1963 and when the paperback rights were sold in the spring of that year, it was "probably the highest price that had hitherto been paid for a first novel," according to Howard. British reviewers found the novel to be an innovative thriller, and several American critics detected a serious promotion of existentialist thought.

The success of The Collector meant that Fowles could stop teaching and devote himself full-time to a literary career. Film rights to the book were optioned and it was adapted as a feature film of the same name in 1965. Against the advice of his publisher, Fowles insisted that his second published book be The Aristos, a non-fiction collection of philosophical essays. Afterward, he set about collating all the drafts he had written of what would become his most studied work, The Magus.

In 1965, Fowles left London, moving to Underhill, a farm on the fringes of Lyme Regis, Dorset. The isolated farm house became the model for The Dairy in the book Fowles was writing: The French Lieutenant's Woman (1969). Finding the farm too remote, ("total solitude gets a bit monotonous," Fowles remarked), in 1968 he and his wife moved to Belmont, in Lyme Regis (Belmont was formerly owned by Eleanor Coade), which Fowles used as a setting for parts of The French Lieutenant's Woman. In this novel, Fowles created one of the most enigmatic female characters in literary history. His conception of femininity and myth of masculinity as developed in this text is psychoanalytically informed.

In the same year, he adapted The Magus for cinema, and the film was released in 1968. The film version of The Magus (1968) was generally considered awful; when Peter Sellers was asked whether he would make changes in his life if he had the opportunity to do it all over again, he jokingly replied, "I would do everything exactly the same except I wouldn't see The Magus." (Note: Peter Sellers' comment is frequently misattributed to Woody Allen.)

The French Lieutenant's Woman (1969) was released to critical and popular success. It was translated into more than ten languages, and established Fowles's international reputation. It was adapted as a feature film in 1981 with a screenplay by the noted British playwright (and later Nobel laureate) Harold Pinter, and starring Meryl Streep and Jeremy Irons.

Fowles lived the rest of his life in Lyme Regis. His works The Ebony Tower (1974), Daniel Martin (1977), Mantissa (1982), and A Maggot (1985) were all written from Belmont House. In 1980 he wrote a highly appreciative introduction to G. B. Edwards's The Book of Ebenezer Le Page (Hamish Hamilton, 1981), the fictional autobiography set in Guernsey: 'There may have been stranger literary events than the book you are about to read but I rather doubt it' (reprinted in his Wormholes: Essays and Occasional Writings, ed. Jan Relf (Jonathan Cape, 1998), pp. 166–74.

Fowles composed a number of poems and short stories throughout his life, most of which were lost or destroyed. In December 1950 he wrote My Kingdom for a Corkscrew. For A Casebook (1955) was rejected by various magazines. In 1970 he wrote The Last Chapter.

In 2008 Fowles was named by The Times as one of the fifty greatest British writers since 1945.

== Personal life ==
Fowles served as the curator of the Lyme Regis Museum from 1979 to 1988, retiring from the museum after having a mild stroke. He was occasionally involved in local politics, writing letters to The Times advocating preservation. Despite this involvement, he was generally considered reclusive.

In 1990, his first wife Elizabeth died of cancer, only a week after she was diagnosed. Her death affected him severely, and he did not write for a year. In 1998, he was quoted in the New York Times Book Review as saying, "Being an atheist is a matter not of moral choice, but of human obligation."

In 1998, Fowles married his second wife, Sarah Smith. With Sarah by his side, he died of heart failure on 5 November 2005, aged 79, in Axminster Hospital, 5 miles (8.0 km) from Lyme Regis.

In 2008, Elena van Lieshout presented a series of 120 love letters and postcards for auction at Sotheby's. The correspondence started in 1990, when Fowles was aged 65. Elena, a young Welsh admirer and a student at St. Hilda's College, Oxford, contacted the reclusive author and they developed a sensitive, albeit unconsummated, relationship.

== List of works ==
- (1963) The Collector
- (1964) The Aristos, essays (ISBN 0-586-05377-8)
- (1965) The Magus (revised 1977)
- (1969) The French Lieutenant's Woman
- (1973) Poems by John Fowles
- (1974) The Ebony Tower
- (1974) Shipwreck
- (1977) Daniel Martin
- (1978) Islands
- (1979) The Tree
- (1980) The Enigma of Stonehenge
- (1982) A Short History of Lyme Regis
- (1982) Mantissa
- (1985) A Maggot
- (1985) Land (with Fay Godwin)
- (1990) Lyme Regis Camera
- (1998) Wormholes - Essays and Occasional Writings
- (2003) The Journals – Volume 1
- (2006) The Journals – Volume 2
