= Brigitte Bako =

Canadian actress (born 1967)

- Born: May 15, 1967 (age 59); Montreal, Quebec, Canada
- Occupations: Actress, producer, writer
- Years active: 1989–present

Brigitte Bako (born May 15, 1967) is a Canadian actress, producer, and writer. Following her film debut in New York Stories (1989), Bako had supporting roles in films such as One Good Cop (1991) and Strange Days (1995), as well as a lead role in I Love a Man in Uniform (1993). She is best known for her lead role as Gigi on the Showcase comedy series G-Spot (2005–09), which she also wrote and produced.

Bako is also known for providing the voices of Angela on the Disney animated fantasy series Gargoyles (1995–97) and Monique Dupre on the Fox Kids animated science fiction series Godzilla: The Series (1998–00). Her most recent writing and acting credits were in 2009, for her work on the series G-Spot, while her most recent producer credit was for the 2010 short film David and Goliath, based on the WWII experiences of her father, David Bako, while a resistance fighter against Nazi Germany.

== Early life ==
Bako was born in Montreal, Quebec, to Jewish parents. Her mother is a Holocaust survivor. She trained with the Les Grands Ballets Canadiens and acted with the Canadian National Shakespeare Company.

== Career ==
Her first major break was in Martin Scorsese's New York Stories (1989). She co-starred with David Duchovny and Billy Wirth in Red Shoe Diaries; Benjamin Bratt and Michael Keaton in One Good Cop (1991), and Ralph Fiennes in Strange Days (1995). She starred in I Love a Man in Uniform (1993), her first collaboration with Canadian producer Robert Lantos. Saint Monica was featured at the 2002 Toronto International Film Festival, and Bako received a nomination for the Genie Award for Best Supporting Actress.

She voiced Angela in Gargoyles and Monique Dupre in Godzilla: The Series. Bako worked with Duchovny again in a 2007 episode of the Showtime series Californication (Episode 9, "Filthy Lucre," as a Porsche saleswoman).

After 15 years out of the spotlight, Bako returned with an audio and video podcast Lies My Vagina Told Me, based on funny stories from her showbiz past and those of the friends she made along the way.

== Filmography ==
=== Cinema ===
- New York Stories (1989)
- One Good Cop (1991)
- Red Shoe Diaries (1992)
- I Love a Man in Uniform (1993)
- Dark Tide (1994)
- Replikator (1994)
- Strange Days (1995)
- Irving (1995)
- Double Take (1997)
- Dinner and Driving (1997)
- The Escape (1997)
- The Week That Girl Died (1998)
- Paranoia (1998)
- Primary Suspect (2000)
- Wrong Number (2001)
- Sweet Revenge (2001)
- Saint Monica (2002)
- Who's the Top? (2005)

=== TV series ===
- Fifteenth Phase of the Moon (TV-1992)
- Gargoyles ("Angela" [voice] 1995 - 1997)
- 3×3 Eyes (voice, 1995)
- Godzilla: The Series (voice, 1998)
- Secret Agent Man ("Mirage"; 2000, episode "Fail-Safe")
- The Mind of the Married Man (2001)
- The Atwood Stories (2003, episode "Isis in Darkness")
- Law & Order (2004, episode "Darwinian")
- G-Spot (2005–2009)
- Californication (2007, episode "Filthy Lucre")
