= Addabbo =

Addabbo is a surname. Notable people with the surname include:

- Anthony Addabbo (1960–2016), American actor and model
- Joseph Patrick Addabbo (1925–1986), American politician
- Joseph Addabbo Jr. (born 1964), American politician
- Steve Addabbo (born 1950), American record producer
