= Love on the Run =

Love on the Run may refer to:

== Film ==
- Love on the Run (1936 film), starring Clark Gable and Joan Crawford
- Love on the Run (1979 film), a French film directed by François Truffaut
- Love on the Run (1985 film), a made-for-television film starring Alec Baldwin
- Love on the Run (1994 film), an American TV film
- Love on the Run (2016 film), starring Annaleigh Ashford

== Music ==
- "Love on the Run" (Chicane song), a 2003 song by Chicane
- "Love on the Run" (Sons of Zion song), 2021
- "Love on the Run", a song by the Human League, from the 1986 album Crash (The Human League album)
- "Love on the Run", a song by Scorpions, from the 1988 album Savage Amusement

== Television ==
- Love on the Run (TV series), an Indian series featuring Saanvi Talwar
- "Love on the Run", an episode of the television comedy Diff'rent Strokes
- "Love on the Run", an episode of the television comedy Major Dad
