= Tarik Ergin =

Turkish-American actor (born 1961)

- Born: June 7, 1961 (age 64); Hingham, Massachusetts, U.S.

Tarik Ergin (born June 7, 1961) is a Turkish-American actor.

Ergin was born in Hingham, Massachusetts of Turkish descent. He played the part of Lieutenant Junior Grade Ayala in Star Trek: Voyager, as well as "Satan's Robot" from the Captain Proton holodeck program and Lt. Coris Sprint in the Star Trek: Borg computer game. He was only credited as Ayala in the two episodes "Fury" (as "Security Guard") and "Renaissance Man" (as "Tactical N.D." [Non-Dialogue], even though he worked at the conn and spoke dialogue).

Prior to his roles on Star Trek, he played minor roles in episodes of Red Shoe Diaries and in the movie Improper Conduct in 1994.

Ergin has been a lifelong lacrosse player, and served as a professional player and coach with the Hollywood Lacrosse Club in 2010. In addition, he has been the head coach of the Oak Park Lacrosse Varsity team at Oak Park High School in Ventura County since 2011. He has also worked as Director of Coaching with the LA Mavericks since 2017.
