= Denice D. Lewis =

American fashion model, actor and abstract artist

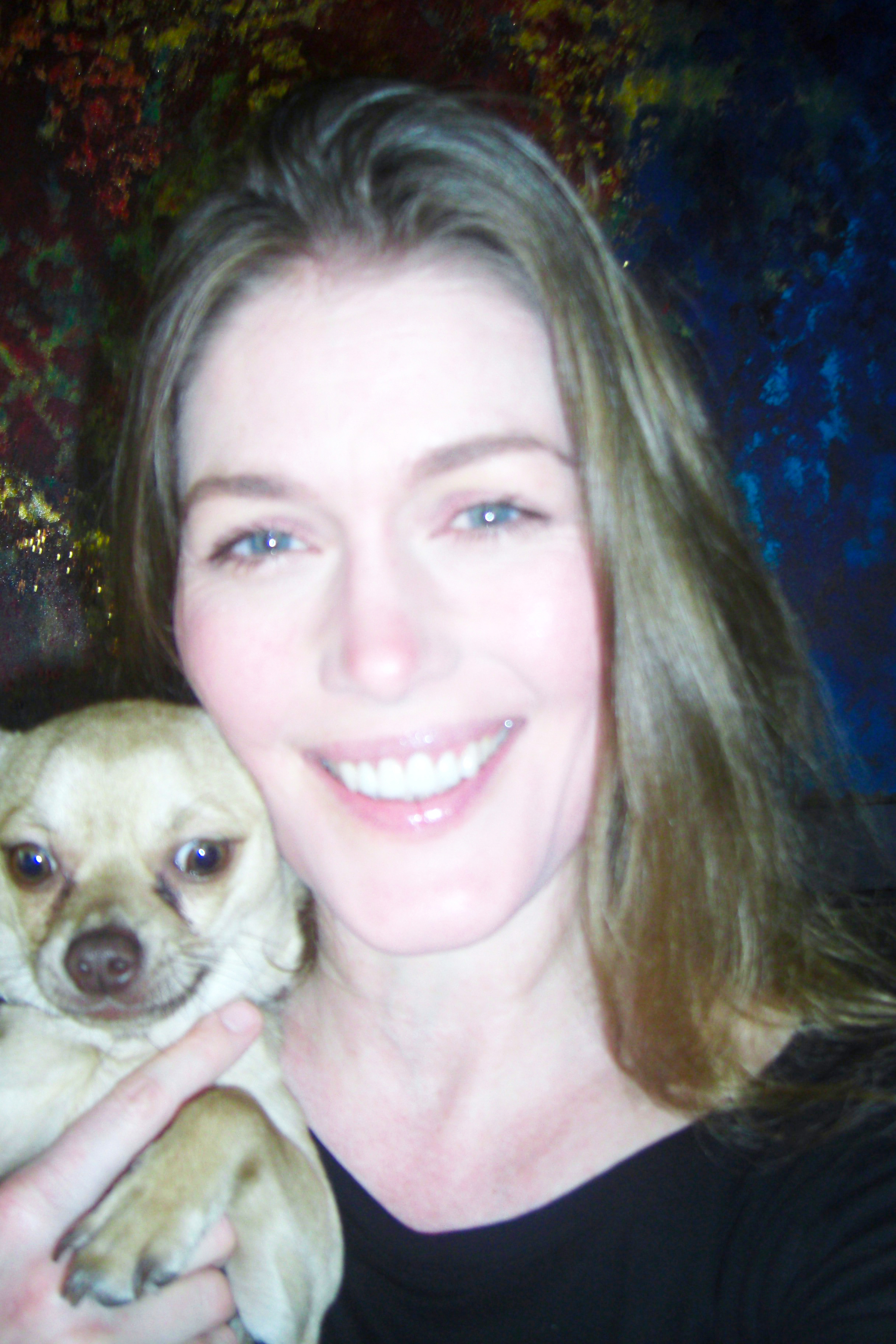
- Lewis in 2008
- Born: November 28, 1960 (age 65); Lynchburg, Virginia, U.S.
- Occupations: Model; actress; artist; entrepreneur
- Years active: 1980–present
- Spouse: Al Seckel (m. 2004, separated)
- Website: denicelewisstudios.com

Denice D. Lewis (born November 28, 1960) is an American fashion model, actor, and abstract artist. Following her modeling career, Lewis returned to America to further study visual arts in Hollywood including photography, fine art painting, and filmmaking. She appeared as an actor in several films, including End of Days (1999) with Arnold Schwarzenegger, and television shows such as Red Shoe Diaries.

== Acting career ==
Alongside appearances in music videos such as Kiss and Tell by Bryan Ferry, Slow Rivers by Elton John and Cliff Richard, and I'm Too Sexy by Right Said Fred; Lewis pursued an acting career. She landed various parts in episodes of the TV shows Red Shoe Diaries, Burke's Law (January 1994), Silk Stalkings, and Renegade. She also appeared in films, including H.P. Lovecraft’s Necronomicon: Book of the Dead as the drowned wife, Ed Wood’s I Woke Up Early the Day I Died, and as Arnold Schwarzenegger’s wife in End of Days.

=== Music videos ===
Year	Title	Artist
1980	"Shandi"	Kiss
1992	"I'm Too Sexy"	Right Said Fred
1991	"Senza una donna"	Zucchero Fornaciari and Paul Young
1990	"Everytime You Leave"	Conspiracy
1987	"Kiss and Tell"	Bryan Ferry
1986	"Slow Rivers"	Elton John and Cliff Richard
1985	"The Flame"	Arcadia

=== Television ===
Year	Title	Role
1995	Renegade	Dominique
1995	Silk Stalkings	Shannon St. John
1994–1995	Burke's Law	Kate Lipton
1993–1995	Red Shoe Diaries	Ester/Precious
2009	Dodi Al-Fayed: What Really Happened (Channel 4 documentary)	Herself

=== Film ===
Year	Title	Role
1999	End of Days	Emily
1999	Diamondbacks	Elizabeth Pierson
1998	I Woke Up Early the Day I Died	Star Stripper
1993	Necronomicon: Book of the Dead	Emma De Lapoer

=== Magazine covers ===
Magazine	Issue
Town & Country	May 1988
Tatler	July/August 1988
Tatler	December 1989
People	February 3, 1991
Telegraph	March 16, 1991

== Personal life ==
In the early 2000s, Lewis during a hiatus from public life, became an abstract impressionist artist in Los Angeles specializing in memorial paintings in which the ashes of the deceased are mixed with the pigment. Lewis married Al Seckel in Las Vegas in 2004. Though they apparently separated, and Sekel later remarried before his death in 2015, the marriage was never annulled.
