= Necronomicon (film) =

1993 horror anthology

- DVD cover
- Directed by: Brian Yuzna ("The Library" and "Whispers"); Christophe Gans ("The Drowned"); Shusuke Kaneko ("The Cold")
- Screenplay by: Brent V. Friedman; Christophe Gans ("The Drowned"); Kazunori Itō ("The Cold")
- Story by: Brent V. Friedman; Brian Yuzna
- Based on: The works of H. P. Lovecraft
- Produced by: Brian Yuzna; Samuel Hadida
- Starring: Bruce Payne; Richard Lynch; Jeffrey Combs; Belinda Bauer; David Warner; Maria Ford
- Cinematography: Gerry Lively ("The Cold" and "Whispers"); Russell Brandt ("The Library" and "The Drowned")
- Edited by: Christopher Roth; Keith H. Sauter
- Music by: Joseph LoDuca ("The Library" and "The Drowned"); Daniel Licht ("The Cold" and "Whispers")
- Production companies: Davis Films; Optic Nerve Studios
- Distributed by: August Entertainment Inc.; New Line Home Video
- Release dates: November 19, 1993 (London); October 29, 1996 (United States)
- Running time: 96 minutes
- Countries: United States; France; Japan
- Language: English
- Budget: $4 million (estimated)

Necronomicon (also called H. P. Lovecraft's Necronomicon, Necronomicon: Book of the Dead or Necronomicon: To Hell and Back) is a 1993 anthology horror film. It features three distinct segments and a wraparound directed by Brian Yuzna, Christophe Gans and Shusuke Kaneko and written by Gans, Yuzna, Brent V. Friedman and Kazunori Itō. The stories for the segments were all newly written for the anthology but were inspired by the works of horror writer H. P. Lovecraft. The film's ensemble cast includes stars Jeffrey Combs, Bruce Payne, Richard Lynch, Belinda Bauer, Maria Ford, Dennis Christopher, Gary Graham and David Warner. The extensive special makeup and animatronic effects were supervised by Tom Savini and were created by John Carl Buechler, Christopher Nelson and Screaming Mad George.

== Plot ==
The film is broken into four separate features. "The Library" segment is a frame story.

=== The Library ===
H. P. Lovecraft visits a monastery where a copy of the Necronomicon is held. Requesting to read the Alchemical Encyclopedia Vol. III, Lovecraft steals a key from another monk and flees to the cellar vault, where the Necronomicon is being held. A monk spies him. The vault door closes behind Lovecraft, making him drop the key down a grating and into the water. One of the seals is opened. Lovecraft sits to read and record what he is reading.

=== The Drowned ===
- Based on "The Rats in the Walls"

Upon a boat trip return to New England, a crash on the shore kills Jethro De Lapoer's wife and son. Using the Necronomicon, Jethro brings his family back to life. However, they are revived as unholy monsters with green glowing eyes and tentacles in their mouths. Feeling guilty, he commits suicide by casting himself off an upper floor balcony.

Jethro's nephew Edward, distraught over a car accident years before which killed his wife, Clara, finds the Necronomicon and performs the ritual to revive her. Edward apologizes to Clara for the accident. Clara begins to regurgitate tentacles, and in a panic, Edward pushes her away. Clara attacks, but Edward takes a sword and cuts her. She turns into a tentacle belonging to a gigantic monster which lives under the floor. Edward cuts a rope holding the chandelier, jumps to it and climbs to the ceiling. "Clara" again tries to restrain him, but Edward destroys a stained glass window. The sunlight drives her away. Edward pushes the chandelier rope free from the pulley. The pointed bottom pierces the monster in the eye, killing it. Now on the roof, Edward has avoided the same fate that Jethro had years before, and decides to live.

=== The Cold ===
- Based on "Cool Air"

Reporter Dale Porkel investigates a string of murders in Boston over the past several decades. He confronts Emily Osterman at her apartment. Emily claims to suffer a rare skin condition which has left her sensitive to heat and light.

Emily says she arrived in Boston twenty years before. Her first night, she is attacked by her sexually abusive stepfather, Sam, who has tracked her down. Another tenant, Dr. Richard Madden, stabs Sam's hand with a scalpel. He falls down the stairs and dies. Emily is bandaged up and given medication. That night, Emily is awakened by the sound of drilling and sees blood dripping from her ceiling. Heading upstairs, she finds Richard and Lena, the building's owner, mutilating Sam's corpse. She passes out, awakening in her bed with a clean ceiling. Richard assures her that it was all a dream.

The next day while job hunting, Emily sees police with flyers asking for information about the murder of Sam. She confronts Richard, and he comes clean: though Sam died from the fall, he would have killed Sam regardless. He reveals a copy of the Necronomicon, through which he learned how to sustain life. Richard proves this by injecting a wilted rose with a compound to revive it, claiming that as long as it is kept out of the sun, it will never die. The two have sex, spied on by Lena.

Lena threatens to kill Emily, as Lena is in love with Richard, a feeling that has never been returned. Emily flees, only to return months later. Upon arrival, Emily finds her boss from the diner in Richard's apartment. Lena stabs the man in the back, killing him. Lena insists on killing Emily, but Richard will not allow it. The two struggle, destroying lab equipment in the process. The resulting fire injures Richard, and he disintegrates. Lena shoots Emily with a shotgun in revenge. Emily announces she is pregnant, and Lena, feeling a loyalty to Richard, saves her.

Dale deduces the woman he is talking to is not Emily's daughter, but Emily herself, having contracted a disease from Richard during intercourse. Emily is still pregnant, hoping one day that her baby may be born, and has continued murdering for spinal fluid. Dale realizes his coffee has been drugged as an aged Lena approaches him, brandishing a syringe.

=== Whispers ===
- Based on The Whisperer in Darkness

During pursuit of a suspect known as "the Butcher", two Philadelphia police officers, Paul and Sarah, are arguing over their failed relationship and the coming baby. The argument leads to a crash, flipping the cruiser upside down. Paul is knocked out and dragged off by an unseen person. Sarah breaks the window and exits the vehicle. Unable to call for backup, she follows a blood trail alone.

Inside an old warehouse, Sarah follows as Paul is taken down a service elevator. Sarah finds a man, Harold Benedict. Insisting he is merely the landlord of the warehouse and the Butcher is a tenant, he offers to lead her to him. Downstairs, the two are shot at by Mrs. Benedict, a blind old woman. Sarah takes the shotgun and orders the two to lead her to the Butcher. Mrs. Benedict indulges in gossip first, insisting she is not really Harold's wife. Sarah makes her way to a cavern. The Benedicts pull the ladder from the hole, leaving Sarah trapped. As Sarah ventures through the cavern, she becomes scared, and promises to keep her unborn child. She finds Paul has been eaten by the bat-like creatures that inhabit the cavern. His brains are needed by the bats to reproduce. The bats corner her. She wakes up on a table, where the Benedicts are seemingly trying to feed her to the monster bats.

Sarah wakes up in a hospital. Her mother and a doctor (who resemble the Benedicts) rush into her room. Sarah was forced to have an abortion as a result of the car accident. Sarah wants to see Paul, but Paul is brain dead, in the same state that he was found back in the caverns. Sarah screams in terror. Her mother opens her blouse and reveals that the aborted baby is inside the womb of the monster-bat creatures. Sarah removes her bed sheets and finds out she has lost half of an arm and both of her legs. The hospital changes back into the cavern. Sarah is still on the table, about to become a meal for the monster bats. Harold wants to leave, but Sarah still has the keys. She laughs hysterically as the bats start feasting on her.

=== The Library ===
Lovecraft is confronted by the head monk, who assures him that all will be fine if he opens the door. Lovecraft admits he dropped the key. Furious, the monk warns Lovecraft to replace the book, but Lovecraft is attacked by a monster in the water beneath him, and the last of the seals opens up. The head monk, who is not human, stretches his body through the bars to enter the room, and Lovecraft uses a sword in his cane to defeat the monster in the water. One of the monks warns Lovecraft of the foolishness of his actions, telling him he will pay for his misdeeds. Lovecraft leaves the monastery by taxi with the book.

== Cast ==
=== The Library (frame story) ===
- Jeffrey Combs as H. P. Lovecraft
- Tony Azito as Librarian
- Brian Yuzna as Cabbie

=== The Drowned ===
- Bruce Payne as Edward De Lapoer
- Belinda Bauer as Nancy Gallmore
- Richard Lynch as Jethro De Lapoer
- Maria Ford as Clara
- Peter Jasienski as Jethro's Son
- Denice D. Lewis as Emma De Lapoer
- Vladimir Kulich as a Villager

=== The Cold ===
- David Warner as Dr. Madden
- Bess Meyer as Emily Osterman
- Millie Perkins as Lena
- Dennis Christopher as Dale Porkel
- Gary Graham as Sam
- Curt Lowens as Mr. Hawkins

=== Whispers ===
- Signy Coleman as Sarah
- Obba Babatundé as Paul
- Don Calfa as Mr. Benedict
- Judith Drake as Mrs. Benedict

== Production ==
Brian Yuzna was trying to get a new film project going using his business connections in Japan and decided a three-story anthology film with a creative team from America, Asia, and Europe respectively would give the film the commercial viability it needed to secure financing. In developing a linking device for the film, Yuzna decided to base the film around the Necronomicon from the writings of H. P. Lovecraft while making the film more inspired by Lovecraft's stories rather than a direct adaptation of them.

== Release ==
Necronomicon was shown at the London Film Festival on November 19, 1993. It was released in Japan on August 13, 1994. Derek Elley of Variety wrote that that any theatrical release in "mature territories" was unlikely beyond venues that showcased splatter films.

Despite being completed in 1993, the film sat on a shelf until it was released direct-to-video on October 29, 1996.

== Critical response ==
Necronomicon was well received upon its initial VHS release in the US, but did substantially better in European and Asian markets. The film won the award for Best Special Effects at the 1994 Fantafestival.

Craig Butler of AllMovie later described the film as "a hit-and-miss affair", commending the writing of the first two segments, special make-up effects, and David Warner's performance, but criticizing the weak writing of the two remaining segments.

With regard to the acting, Iain McLachlan of SFFWorld commented in 2004 that "Payne is especially effective because of his suppression of his tortured grief, adding considerable power to his scenes".

In their 2006 book Lurker in the Lobby: A Guide to the Cinema of H. P. Lovecraft, Andrew Migliore and John Strysik opined that the film "does not deliver on what should have been a great idea. In fact the film loses focus, speed, and atmosphere after the first segment, 'The Drowned', almost as though the production had run out of money and time."
