= War Party (1988 film) =

1988 film directed by Franc Roddam

- War Party movie poster
- Directed by: Franc Roddam
- Written by: Spencer Eastman
- Produced by: John Daly; Derek Gibson; Bernard Williams
- Starring: Billy Wirth; Kevin Dillon; Tim Sampson; M. Emmet Walsh
- Cinematography: Brian Tufano
- Edited by: Sean Barton
- Music by: Chaz Jankel
- Production company: Hemdale Film Corporation
- Distributed by: Hemdale Film Corporation
- Release date: September 15, 1988
- Running time: 99 minutes
- Language: English
- Budget: $7 million
- Box office: $657,190

War Party (released in the Philippines as Toy Soldiers Too) is a 1988 film directed by Franc Roddam and starring Billy Wirth and Kevin Dillon. Set in present-day Montana, it explores the tension and mistrust that can characterize interactions between Native Americans and White Americans.

== Plot ==
A group of re-enactors attempt to stage a 100th-anniversary battle between US Cavalry and Blackfeet Indians. Racial hostilities and a real gun lead to some all too real casualties, and three young Blackfeet men are caught in the middle. The film follows their flight for freedom in the face of an angry community which has mistakenly blamed them for the violence.

== Cast ==
- Billy Wirth as Sonny Crowkiller
- Kevin Dillon as Skitty Harris
- Tim Sampson as Warren Cutfoot
- Jimmie Ray Weeks as Jay Stivic
- Kevyn Major Howard as Calvin Morrisey
- Jerry Hardin as The Sheriff
- Tantoo Cardinal as Sonny's Mother
- Bill McKinney as The Mayor
- Guy Boyd as Major Crawford, National Guard
- R.D. Call as Posse Member #1
- William Frankfather as The Governor
- M. Emmet Walsh as Colin Ditweiler
- Dennis Banks as Ben Crowkiller / Dead Crow Wolf
- Saginaw Grant as Freddie Man Wolf
- Rodney Grant as The Crow

== Production ==
Filming largely took place on the Blackfeet Indian Reservation in Montana. A few scenes were filmed in Glacier National Park, in the town of Cut Bank, Montana and in the town of Choteau, MT.

== Release ==
The film was shown at the 1988 Toronto International Film Festival on September 15, 1988. In the Philippines, the film was released as Toy Soldiers Too on July 3, 1992, connecting the film to the unrelated 1991 film Toy Soldiers.

== Reception ==
On the review aggregator website Rotten Tomatoes, 0% of 6 critics' reviews are positive.
