= Double Take (1998 film) =

1998 film by Mark L. Lester

- Directed by: Mark L. Lester
- Written by: Edward and Ralph Rugoff
- Starring: Craig Sheffer
- Cinematography: Peter Benison
- Edited by: Stephen Fanfara
- Music by: Paul Zaza
- Release date: 1998
- Running time: 86 minutes
- Countries: United States; Canada
- Language: English

Double Take is a 1998 American-Canadian thriller film directed by Mark L. Lester.

== Plot ==
A writer believes he helped wrongly convict a man in an assassination and is pulled into a world of espionage and murder.

== Cast ==
- Craig Sheffer as Connor McEwan
- Costas Mandylor as Hector
- Brigitte Bako as Nikki Capelli
- Dan Lett as Detective Hardaway
- Torri Higginson as Peggy
- Maurice Godin as Fritz
- Peter Keleghan as Robert Mead
- Frank Pellegrino as Frankie

== Reception ==
Chris Parry of eFilmCritic.com wrote: "If you catch this late at night on TV, you may be tempted to watch til the end just to see how awful it can get. Do yourself a favor, fight that urge."
