= One Good Cop =

1991 film by Heywood Gould

- Theatrical release poster
- Directed by: Heywood Gould
- Written by: Heywood Gould
- Produced by: Laurence Mark
- Starring: Michael Keaton; Rene Russo; Anthony LaPaglia; Benjamin Bratt
- Cinematography: Ralf D. Bode
- Edited by: Richard Marks
- Music by: David Foster; William Ross
- Production companies: Hollywood Pictures; Silver Screen Partners IV
- Distributed by: Buena Vista Pictures Distribution
- Release date: May 3, 1991
- Running time: 104 minutes
- Country: United States
- Language: English
- Box office: $11 million

One Good Cop is a 1991 American action thriller film written and directed by Heywood Gould and starring Michael Keaton, Rene Russo, Anthony LaPaglia and Benjamin Bratt. Keaton portrays New York City Police Department Detective Artie Lewis, who, with his wife Rita (Russo), adopts his late partner's (LaPaglia) children and loves them as their own. He also targets one of the criminals responsible for his partner's death. He initially seeks justice for his adoptive children, but ultimately chooses retaliation by robbing his quarry to support his new family, endangering them and his career.

== Plot ==
Artie Lewis is a New York City Police Department detective who believes in his work, loves his wife Rita, and is close to his partner of eight years, Stevie Diroma, a widower with three young daughters. After a hard, violent encounter in a housing project while on duty, Artie and Stevie reassure each other that, although battered and bruised, they have survived.

Stevie is then killed in the line of duty by drug addict Mickey Garrett during a hostage situation. Stevie's daughters Marian, Barbara, and Carol are left orphaned with no relatives able to take them in. Artie is informed that Stevie, in his will, had named Artie the legal guardian of his children in the event of his death.

Artie and Rita take the children in and want to adopt them. It is revealed the couple are unable to have children of their own. However, Child Welfare Services decides that their apartment is too small for three children, and Barbara is a diabetic who needs daily insulin shots.

To gain the welfare agency's approval, Artie feels he must buy a house. The one he has chosen requires a $25,000 down payment that he does not have. In desperation, he grabs his gun and a ski mask and robs drug kingpin Beniamino Rios, whom he has investigated and knows is indirectly responsible for Stevie's death and orphaning the girls since Garrett killed Stevie under the influence of Rios' drugs.

Artie uses $25,000 of the take for a down payment on the house. He gives the rest to Father Wills, who runs a local makeshift shelter, and admits to Rita how he got the money for their house. Beniamino's girlfriend Grace De Feliz is actually an undercover narcotics agent who suspects Artie, but his superior, Lieutenant Danny Quinn, defends Artie as one of his best officers and no action is taken against him.

One of Beniamino's customers, who gave Artie a tip as to the location where Beniamino kept his money, breaks down under his questioning and gives Artie to the drug lord. Beniamino kidnaps Artie and tortures him to find out what he did with the money. Knowing that Artie will not reveal the information, and is about to be killed, Grace blows her cover and saves him. Together they are forced to kill Beniamino and his colleagues.

Artie writes a confession to Lt. Quinn, preparing to turn himself in for his crime. However, Father Wills turns in most of the money Artie gave him; he used only $200 of it to pay for a museum trip with the shelter's children, and all of Artie's co-workers make up the rest of the stolen money. Grace refuses to testify against him after learning that Artie's actions were not motivated by greed but as a father, so the federal government walks away from the case to avoid compromising its field agents. Quinn understands Artie's motives, is short-staffed for good detectives, and out of loyalty to Artie's slain partner, whose kids will be fatherless again if Artie goes to prison, tells Artie that no charges will be filed against him. Quinn tears up the confession letter and sends Artie home to be with his wife and adoptive children.

Relieved from the ordeal, Artie happily calls Rita to tell her that he is coming home early, and that their family is still together.

== Cast ==
- Michael Keaton as Detective Artie Lewis
- Rene Russo as Rita Lewis, Artie's wife
- Anthony LaPaglia as Detective Stevie Diroma, Artie's partner
- Kevin Conway as Lieutenant Danny Quinn
- Rachel Ticotin as Detective Grace De Feliz
- Tony Plana as Beniamino Rios
- Benjamin Bratt as Detective Felix
- Charlayne Woodard as Cheryl Clark
- David Barry Gray as Mickey Garrett
- Grace Johnston as Marian Diroma, Stevie's first daughter later Artie & Rita's adoptive daughter
- Rhea Silver-Smith as Barbara Diroma, Stevie's second daughter later Artie & Rita's adoptive daughter
- Blair Swanson as Carol Diroma, Stevie's third daughter later Artie & Rita's adoptive daughter
- Kevin Corrigan as Clifford
- Vondie Curtis-Hall as Father Wills
- Victor Rivers as Oreste
- Lisa Arrindell as Raisa
- Rick Aiello as Detective Knudson
- Mike Hagery as Detective Walsh
- J.E. Freeman as Captain Schreiber
- Thomas A. Carlin as Farrell
- Brigitte Bako as Mrs. Garrett, Mickey's wife
- Tommy Kramer as Henry Garrett, Mickey's brother
- Danny Kramer as Arthur Garrett, Mickey's other brother
- Penny Santon as Mrs. Cristofaro
- Doug Barron as Dr. Gelb
- Vivien Straus as Mrs. Frazier
- Alicia Brandt as Robin
- Andre Benita as Martha
- Kristina Loggia as Irene
- George Cheung as Waiter
- Frank Ferrara as Burly Prisoner
- Ralph Nieves as Beniamino Scout
- Joey Banks as Beniamino Associate #1
- Justin De Rosa as Beniamino Associate #2
- Thomas Rosales Jr. as Beniamino Associate #3
- Tierre Turner as First Hood
- Robby Robinson as Second Hood
- Henry Kingi Jr. as Third Hood

== Reception ==
The movie received mixed reviews. Peter Rainer of the Los Angeles Times said that "The realism of this film is a kind of fraud. We’re supposed to be seeing how the ultra-violence of police work clashes with the ordinariness of a cop’s domestic life. And yet the many drug-bust shoot-'em-ups that we witness seem like so much spicing in the melodrama. " Janet Maslin of The New York Times plaintively observed:

The word "good" would not ordinarily apply to a police detective who robs, cheats and kills in the line of duty, as Artie Lewis (Michael Keaton) is seen doing in "One Good Cop." But Heywood Gould, who wrote and directed the first known Disney film (actually a release of Hollywood Pictures, a Disney subsidiary) to include a close-up of somebody who has been run through by a sword, envisions his story's hero as a latter-day ultrapractical Robin Hood. "One Good Cop" is so confusingly edited that it takes a long time to determine whether the filmmaker is kidding about this. He's not. Mr. Gould, once a police reporter for The New York Post and later the man who conceived the fun-loving bartender of "Cocktail," is clearly a moralist with a mind of his own. He presents Artie Lewis's little excesses as the honest responses of a man determined to do what's best for the children in his life, even if -- especially if -- those children do not happen to be his own.

Owen Gleiberman of Entertainment Weekly gave the film a C−, dubbing it "a schizophrenic high-concept movie" with "an unconscionably cynical blend of violence and sentimentality."

In his review for the Chicago Sun-Times, Roger Ebert wrote,

"One Good Cop" wanted to manipulate my emotions, and I was willing to let it try, but finally it was so shameless that I'd had enough. I always feel creepy anyway in movies where cute little children look at the camera with big brown eyes and beg for my sympathy. The movie is slick and clever, but it's immoral at its core, and the more you think about it, the more dishonest it seems.

Ebert's main criticism of the film was towards its resolution, in which Michael Keaton's character does not lose his job or face criminal charges for his illegal actions:

... even if you grant that premise, the movie's last scene, which is supposed to be a happy ending, gets less and less happy the more you think about it, because it assumes the silence and acquiescence of the entire police department (the possibility of an Internal Affairs investigation isn't even contemplated).

This movie argues that the end justifies the means. It stacks the deck so shamelessly in favor of that assumption - especially with all those adorable little orphans - that I wanted to kick back. I wanted to say, look, there are a lot of police detectives, especially childless ones with wives who work, whose salaries don't force them to steal in order to move out of small apartments. And there are a lot of cops who wouldn't kick in a week's salary (as the cops in this movie do) to help out a colleague who broke the law.

No matter how sentimental and selfless the reasons behind it, a crime is a crime, and covering it up implicates everybody in the corruption. I don't know what the filmmakers thought, but I don't think "One Good Cop" has a happy ending.

== Box office ==
One Good Cop debuted at No. 2 on its opening weekend, making only $3.3 million.
