= Ruth Schönthal =

German composer (1924–2006)

Ruth Schonthal
- Born: June 27, 1924; Hamburg, Germany
- Died: July 10, 2006 (aged 82); Scarsdale, New York, U.S.
- Occupations: Pianist, composer
- Years active: 1929-2006
- Spouse: Paul Seckel
- Children: Al Seckel

Ruth Esther Hadassah Schonthal (June 27, 1924 – July 10, 2006) was an acclaimed classical composer, pianist, and teacher. Born in Germany, she lived in the U.S. for most of her life. After she moved to the U.S. she dropped the umlaut from the name Schönthal. She came to study composition at Yale University in 1946. After her marriage in 1950 she lived first in New York City and then in New Rochelle.

== Biography ==
Ruth Schonthal was born in Hamburg of Viennese parents. At the age of five she began composing and became the youngest student ever accepted at the Stern'sche Konservatorium in Berlin. In 1935, Schonthal and her family were forced to leave Nazi Germany for Stockholm on account of her Jewish heritage. At the Royal Swedish Academy of Music in Stockholm, she studied composition with Ingemar Liljefors and piano with Olaf Wibergh. At the age of fourteen, she had her first sonatina published. In March 1941, three months before she would have been able to graduate, the family was once again forced to flee as a result of the rising political tension. They traveled to a variety of places—Moscow USSR, then Japan—and finally to Mexico City. In 1942 she married Oscar Manuel Ochoa. Their son Benjamin was born in 1944. She divorced Ochoa in 1946.

In Mexico City she studied with Manuel Ponce. At the age of 19 she gave a very widely acclaimed piano performance of her own compositions, including her First Piano Concerto, at the Palacio de Bellas Artes. Among the audience members was the noted German composer Paul Hindemith, who obtained a scholarship for her to study with him at Yale University in 1946. She graduated from the Yale School of Music with honors in 1948 and at first earned a living by writing advertising jingles and popular songs.

In 1950, Schonthal married the painter Paul Bernhard Seckel (b. 1918) and settled in New York City, eventually moving to New Rochelle, where she lived for most of her life. The Seckels had two sons: Bernhard (b. 1953), and Alfred (1958–2015), an authority on visual illusions.

Schonthal received commissions for chamber music, operas, symphonic compositions, as well as works for organ and piano. She taught composition and music theory at NYU until 2006 when deteriorating health forced her to resign. She also taught composition and piano privately and was the first composition teacher of American composer Lowell Liebermann. One close student of hers between 2003 and 2005, the unknown Stephanie Germanotta, went on to great fame in the pop music world as Lady Gaga.

Schonthal used her music to support herself and her family throughout her life. She wrote for television and commercials, played the piano in various bars and clubs, and taught privately in New York.

== Musical compositions ==
"Her music is expressionist, her forms ingenious," writes Catherine Parsons Smith; like other Hindemith students she strove to break free of his influence. Smith notes that being isolated from her composing contemporaries enabled her to distance herself from many contemporary trends of composition and allowed her to develop a compositional voice stemming from a classic-romantic heritage. Her learning process, extending over several continents, certainly contributed to her diverse music as well.

Her works are widely performed in the US and abroad. After free-lancing with several publishers (Oxford University Press, Southern Music Co, Carl Fischer, G. E. Schirmer, Sisra Press, Fine Arts Music Co, Hildegard Music Publishing Co.), in 1998 she established a relationship with a single publisher, Furore in Kassel, to publish new works and republish others. Her music has been widely recorded. Her papers are archived in the Akademie der Künste in Berlin.

== Awards ==
In 1994 she received the Internationaler Kunstlerinnen Preis of the City of Heidelberg, and was honored with an exhibition of her life and works at the Prinz Carl am Kornmarkt Museum there. In the United States, she received several Meet the Composer grants and ASCAP awards and a Delta Omicron International award for her first string quartet. She received a Certificate of Merit from Yale for Outstanding Service to Music, and an Outstanding Musician Award from New York University. "The Courtship of Camilla" (1979–1980) reached the finalist stage in the New York City Opera Competition in 1980; the set of 24 Preludes titled "In Homage of . . . " (1978) was a finalist in the Kennedy-Friedheim Competition.

== Interviews ==
- Selma Epstein, "Composer Interview: Ruth Schonthal," Journal of the IAWM (International Alliance for Women in Music), February 1994, pp. 5–8.
- "Ruth Schonthal: A Conversation With Bruce Duffie" [January 2004].
- WNCN-FM interview, David Dubal with Ruth Schonthal, 31-Oct-1980 on YouTube

== Selected works ==
Opera

- The Courtship of Camilla (1979/80), A.A. Milne
- Jocasta (1996/97), text by Hélène Cixous
- Princess Maleen (1988/89)

Orchestra

- Concerto for Piano and Orchestra No.2 (1977)
- Evening Music, Nocturnal Fantasy with Oceanwaves
- Music for Horn and Chamber Orchestra (1978)
- The Beautiful Days of Aranjuez (1982, rev. 1983)
- Soundtrack for a Dark Street (1994)
- 3 Celebrations "Happy Birthday Variations" for children's concerts
- The Young Dead Soldiers for choir and chamber orchestra (1987)

Chamber music

- Duo for clarinet or viola and cello (2002)
- Four Epiphanies for unaccompanied viola (1976)
- Improvisation for solo cello (1994)
- Sonata Concertante for cello or viola or clarinet and piano (1973)
- String Quartet No.1 (1962)
- String Quartet No.2 "in the Viennese Manner" (1983, revised 1996)
- String Quartet No.3 "In memoriam Holocaust" (1997)
- Tango for Two for clarinet and cello (2002)
- Two Duets for violin and viola (2002)

Piano/Harpsichord

- The Canticles of Hieronymus (1986).
- Fiestas y Danzas (1961).
- Fourteen Inventions (1984).
- From the Life of a Pious Woman (1999).
- Heidelberger Fanfare with Variations.
- In Homage of ... (24 Preludes).
- Japanese Sketches, Book I (Junior), Book II (Lower Intermediate), *Book III (Intermediate).
- Nachklange (Reverberations) (1967–74) for piano with added timbres.
- Sonatensatz (1973),
- Sonata Breve (1973),
- Sonata quasi un 'Improvisazione' (1964).
- Sonatina in A (1939).
- Three Elegies (1982).
- Toccata and Arietta (1989)
- 65 Celebrations (1993/94)
- Gestures (1978/79), eleven short piano pieces
- Self-Portrait of the Artist as an Older Woman for piano (1991)
- Variations in Search of a Theme for piano (1974)
- Bird Calls (1981)
- Educational piano music (collections, grade 1–2)
- Miniatures, study and recital pieces for the Early Grades Vol.1, 2,3 for piano (grade 1–3).
- Potpourri/Minuscules for piano
- Near and Far (Adult beginners)
- Pentatonics for piano
- From North and South of the Border

Organ

- The Temptation of St. Anthony (1989/90)

== Discography ==
- Sonata concertante for clarinet and piano. Jessica Lindsey, clarinet; Christian Bohnenstengel, piano. Set No Limits CD, Albany Records 2018.
- String Quartet No. 3, "In Memoriam Holocaust". Bingham String Quartet. Jewish String Quartets. Naxos CD 8.559451. 2006.
- The Canticles of Hieronymus (1986). Self-Portrait of the Artist As An Older Woman (1991). Variations In Search of a Theme (1976). Nachklänge (Reverberations) (1967–1974). Sonatina (1939). Adina Mornell, piano. Reverberations: Adina Mornell Plays Ruth Schonthal. Akademie der Künste CD 0085162 ACA. 2002.
- Canticles. Gestures. Self-Portrait. Margaret Mills, piano. Margaret Mills Plays Piano Works by Lowell Liebermann and Ruth Schonthal. Cambria Records CD. 1994.
- Early Songs. Widlunger Liederyzklus. Drei Liebeslieder. Margaret Astrup, soprano; Ruth Schonthal and Jane Forsyth, piano. Margaret Astrup Sings Ruth Schonthal. Albany Records, 2007.
- Frühe Lieder (Early Songs) (1944) (Rilke). Susan Gonzalez, soprano; Marcia Eckert, piano. Songs by Women. Leonarda CD LE352. 2003
- String Quartet. Crescent Quartet. Vive la Différence: String Quartets by 5 Women from 3 Continents. Leonarda CD LE336. 1997. Concluding section re-released in album Women Composers: The Lost Tradition Found.
- In Homage of... 24 Preludes. Nanette Kaplan Solomon, piano. Sunbursts: Solo Piano Works by 7 American Women. Leonarda CD #LE345. 1998.
- Fiestas y Danzas (solo piano). Character Sketches: Solo Piano Works by 7 American Women. Leonarda CD LE334. 1995.

== Bibliography ==
- Broda, C. The Piano Works of Ruth Schonthal diss.., Manhattan School of Music, 1991.
- Heister, Hanns-Werner, and Walter-Wolfgang Sparrer, Komponisten der Gegenwart. München: edition text + kritik im Richard Boorberg Verlag GmbH & Co. KG, 1992– .
- Helmig, Martina. Ruth Schonthal: A Composer's Musical Development in Exile, Lewiston, NY: Edwin Mellen Press, 2006. Transl. by Vanessa Agnew of Ruth Schonthal: ein kompositorischer Werdegang im Exil. Diss., Freie U., Berlin, 1993; Hildesheim, 1994.
- Kozinn, Allan. "Ruth Schonthal, a Composer of Eclectic Vision, Dies at 82." New York Times, July 19, 2006.
- Levin, Neil W. "Ruth Schonthal." Milken Archive of Jewish Music, [2006].
- Luttmann, Steve. "Ruth Schonthal." Women and Music in America since 1900: An Encyclopedia. Edited by Kristin N Burns. Westport, CT, & London: Greenwood Press. 2002 ISBN 978-1573563093 vol.2, p. 594-596
- "Ruth Schonthal: In Memoriam" SAI-National (3/2007)(Author unknown; article not available in 2022.)
- Smith, Catherine Parsons. "Schonthal, Ruth." Grove Music Online. Oxford Music Online. Oxford University Press.. Accessed 18 Mar. 2013. (print: New Grove Dictionary of Music and Musicians, 2nd ed., 2001. v.22 p. 614 ISBN 1-56159-239-0 )
- Smith, Catherine Parsons: ‘Schonthal, Ruth’ Grove Music Online ed. L. Macy (Accessed 23 April 2007)
