= G-Spot (TV series) =

Canadian television series

- Country of origin: Canada
- Original language: English
- No. of episodes: 26

Production
- Running time: 30 minutes

Original release
- Network: The Movie Network; Movie Central
- Release: April 25, 2005 – May 20, 2009

G-Spot is a Canadian comedy television series. The show debuted on The Movie Network and Movie Central on April 25, 2005, and ran for two seasons until April 3, 2006, and is also seen on the Showcase and E! network. The show is executive produced by, written by and stars Brigitte Bako. A third season aired in 2009 with eight new episodes.

== Cast ==
- Brigitte Bako as Gigi
- Heather Hanson as Stella
- Kimberly Huie as Roxy
- Ian Alden as Rick
- Hannah Lochner as Sasha
- Sebastian Spence as Paul
- Kristin Lehman as Francesca (Season 1)
- Stephanie Moore as Livia (Seasons 2–3)

=== Guest stars ===
- Michael T. Weiss
- Scott Thompson

== Main crew ==
- Michael Kennedy
- Steve DiMarco (four episodes, 2005)
- David Wu (four episodes, 2005)
- Shawn Thompson (two episodes, 2006)
- Brigitte Bako (14 episodes, 2005–2006)
- Michael Short (five episodes, 2006)
- Alex Pugsley
- Johanna Stein

== International broadcasters ==
Country	Broadcaster	Date of Premiere
Japan	Fox Life	Season 1: May 10, 2009; Season 2: June 7, 2009; Season 3: August 2, 2009
