= Red Shoe Diaries (film) =

1992 film by Zalman King

- Film poster
- Written by: Patricia Louisianna Knop; Zalman King
- Directed by: Zalman King
- Starring: David Duchovny; Brigitte Bako; Billy Wirth
- Music by: George S. Clinton
- Country of origin: United States
- Original language: English

Production
- Producers: David Saunders; Rafael Eisenman
- Editor: Heidi Scharfe-Blair
- Running time: 105 minutes
- Production companies: Republic Pictures Television; 10 DB

Original release
- Network: Showtime
- Release: May 16, 1992

Red Shoe Diaries is a 1992 romantic drama television film directed by Zalman King and starring David Duchovny, Brigitte Bako, and Billy Wirth. The story follows a man who grieves the loss of his fiancée and discovers a diary she kept that details a side of her he never knew. The film was produced as a pilot for the Showtime anthology series Red Shoe Diaries and premiered on the network on May 16, 1992.

== Plot ==
Jake Winters, a successful architect, attends the funeral of his fiancée, Alex. It is revealed Alex’s death was the result of suicide. A heartbroken Jake returns to the upscale loft he shared with Alex and discovers a diary she kept leading up to her last days. Her diary details an affair she had.

Flashbacks show the beginnings of Alex’s affair. While walking home one day, she has a chance meeting with a handsome construction worker when he saves her from a collision with a car by pulling her into his arms. Alex becomes infatuated with the worker and decides to follow him one day, learning he works a second job as a shoe salesman. She goes into the store and buys a pair of red high heels from him, and the man invites her to meet him at his place the following night.

Despite her loving relationship with Jake, she embarks on a torrid affair with the other man, named Tom. Feeling guilt for her actions, she attempts to pause the affair, but this only prompts Tom to seek Alex out at her interior design job and threaten to make their relationship public. Alex starts to feel trapped between the two men and wishes she could solicit advice from other women by placing a personal ad in the newspaper, thinking to herself: "Woman out of control seeks clues to own dark pain and passion from other women's experiences. Willing to pay top dollar. Send diaries to Red Shoes, P.O. Box...."

On Alex’s 26th birthday, Jake proposes to her. She is overcome with joy but has hesitations, warning Jake about her history of self-destructive behavior. Jake brushes away her worries with reassurances he loves her. Alex brings Jake to inform her mother of her engagement, but her mother is cold and judgmental. Though Alex is mortified by her mother’s condescending comments to Jake, he remains undeterred and questions what she is so afraid of.

Alex meets with Tom at a hotel intending to end the affair. She breaks the news she is getting married and will not be seeing him anymore, leaving him furious. He tells her their affair won’t be over until he decides it’s over, and she slaps him and pushes him away while admitting that she wants him; they again have sex. Alex returns home in a drunken haze, in love with Jake but not wanting to give up Tom. Her mental state becomes frazzled in the ensuing days as she becomes consumed by guilt and depression. In a bathtub, she commits suicide by slitting her wrist.

After reading Alex’s diary, Jake decides to go to the shoe store to confront Tom. Without revealing his identity, Jake toys with Tom by asking if the store carries red heels. He later follows Tom to a bar and challenges him to a one-on-one basketball game for $1,000 at his apartment. Tom agrees, and the two head to the apartment with Jake’s female friends in tow. Though Tom is losing the game, the women fawn over him and Jake becomes increasingly angry and taunting. Jake elbows Tom in the face and the two break into a fist fight. The fight culminates in Jake breaking down and revealing he was engaged to Alex, and that he found her dead in the bathtub. Tom admits he was in love with Alex and punches Jake in the face.

Some time later, Jake decides to place an ad in the newspaper. In the anonymous ad, he asks women who have felt betrayed or betrayed someone else to send personal stories to Red Shoes.

== Cast ==
- David Duchovny as Jake Winters
- Brigitte Bako as Alex
- Billy Wirth as Thomas K. Butler, the Workman
- Kai Wulff as Paul
- Brenda Vaccaro as Martha
- Bridgit Ryan as Marlene
- Evie Sullivan as Gabriella
- Anna Karin as Heidi #1
- Christina Caron as Heidi #2
- Leana Hall as Ingrid
- Jonathan Zeichner as Doctor

== Production ==
On his inspiration for the film, Zalman King said, "I came to Showtime with the idea for a film that would precede the series, which would be about a man, Jake...who was madly in love and about to marry a woman who he thought he knew a lot about. After her death, he finds her diaries and learns the true story. Afterward, he’s so hurt and doesn't understand, so he reaches out in an unusual way by placing an ad asking for women’s diaries and hearing their stories."

King, his wife Patricia Louisianna Knop, and producer David Saunders came up with the idea for the pilot film to set the tone and theme for the series to follow. The film was pitched to Showtime in conjunction with four episodes; Showtime agreed to put up half of the budget of the film and the episodes. The remainder of the budget was recouped with international pre-sales based on the success of King's Wild Orchid.

David Duchovny was cast as Jake shortly before he landed the role of Fox Mulder in The X-Files. As The X-Files grew in popularity, Duchovny continued to appear in the Red Shoe Diaries series, but only as a narrator of episodes, with the exception of a season one standalone episode that continues his story.

== Release ==
After its Showtime premiere, the film was released to video in 1993 as an unrated version. In some countries, the film was released as Wild Orchid III: Red Shoe Diaries, though there are no recurring characters or actors from the previous two films.

Kino Lorber re-released the film on DVD on June 17, 2014. The film was also digitally released on Amazon Prime and Tubi.

== Reception ==
The film received mixed reviews from critics. In The New York Times, John J. O'Connor wrote, "When the actors aren't twirling ecstatically, the camera is revolving about them rhapsodically. There is, though, one fatal flaw. This soft porn is obviously eager to go all the way. Barring that, at least for the time being in television movies, the subtext turns out to be not just frustration but impotence. Neither state is especially erotic." Negative reviews criticized the film's dialogue and underdeveloped characters, with the Los Angeles Times' Chris Willman referring to the movie as a "yuppies-in-heat story". In Variety, Van Gordon Sauter wrote, "The music has an engaging, edgy flair and the production is admirably mounted", but "the performers have no alternative but to play to the level of their material (written by Patricia Knop and Zalman King), which makes them more objects of sympathy than involvement."

In his review for New York, John Leonard wrote, "My advice is to stick with these open mouths, burning torches, reeling cameras, running water, and spilled blood until, in the ultimate loft, you arrive at a confrontation scene involving half-naked hunks, blonde Heidis, red shoes, a dog, basketball, and a bottle of champagne."

At the time of its premiere, the television film was one of Showtime's highest rated programs.
