= The Gunfighters (1987 film) =

1987 film

- Theatrical Poster
- Directed by: Clay Borris
- Written by: Jim Byrnes
- Starring: Art Hindle; Reiner Schöne; Anthony Addabbo
- Cinematography: Miklós Lente
- Edited by: David B. Thompson
- Music by: Domenic Troiano
- Production company: Grosso-Jacobson Productions
- Release date: October 27, 1987
- Running time: 96 min
- Country: Canada
- Language: English

The Gunfighters is a 1987 television Western film, starring Art Hindle and George Kennedy, directed by Clay Borris.

== Plot ==
Three Everett men, brothers Cole (Art Hindle) and Matt (Tony Addabbo) and cousin Dutch (Reiner Schoene), are trying to make a go of their ranch in 1880s Kansas. Cole and Dutch are settled and pacifistic, but Matt is wild, idolizing Billy the Kid and spending his free time honing his gunfighting skills. The three men run afoul of the local cattle baron Deke Turner (George Kennedy), who has gained control of the local bank and has the local sheriff on his payroll, and seeks to acquire the Everett ranch.

Matt gets in a dispute over a woman with someone who works for Turner, and kills him in self-defense. Turner schemes to make it appear as murder, and Matt is forced to flee to Texas. A $500 bounty is immediately placed on his head, and Matt has to kill a man in a shoot-out to keep from being taken in. However he is caught soon after and is returned by train to Kansas to be hung.

Told the news, Cole and Dutch decide to break Matt out of custody. When they do so they all become wanted outlaws. In freeing Matt they enabled another outlaw to get away. He invites the three Everett men to join up with his gang. Without any other good options, they accept. They intend to get back at Turner by robbing him of his holdings all over the state. However the gang they joined up with is more violent than they at first believed, and, in addition, the Pinkerton agency has been hired to track them down.

== Cast ==
- Art Hindle as Cole Everett
- Reiner Schoene as Dutch Everett
- Tony Addabbo as Matt Everett
- George Kennedy as Deke Turner
- Michael Kane as Governor Hornbeck
- Lori Hallier as Sally Wells
- Wendell Smith as Sheriff Burrows
- Howard Kruschke as Jake Morant
- Francis Damberger as Sam Martin
- Beverly Hendry as Kate Burrows
- Moira Wally as Lorna
- Dale Wilson as Coburn
- Bill Meilen as Bennett
- Bryan Fustukian as Henry
- Eric Kramer as Luke Collins
- Blair Haynes as Deputy
- Alex Green as Turner gunman
- Paul Whitney as Turner gunman
- Raoul Tome as Joaquin
- Mike Evans as Clarence Wilson
- Jay Smith as Townsman
- Dennis Robinson as Wes
- Glenn Beck as U.S. Marshal
- Steve Atkinson as Turner's whipman
- James DeFelice as Manuel
- Tom Glass as Stage Driver
- Kent Gallie as Martin gang member
- Paul White as Martin gang member
- Kevin Smith as Texas Sheriff
- Wilf Rowe as Barfly
- Samien Keene as Turner hand
- Larry Yachimec as Turner hand
- Calvin Cairnes as Cosgrove

== Reception ==
The film, as of March 2016, holds a 0% rating with critics not critiquing and the audience rates the program as 67% favorable on Rotten Tomatoes.
