= Al Seckel =

American collector and skeptic (1958–2015)

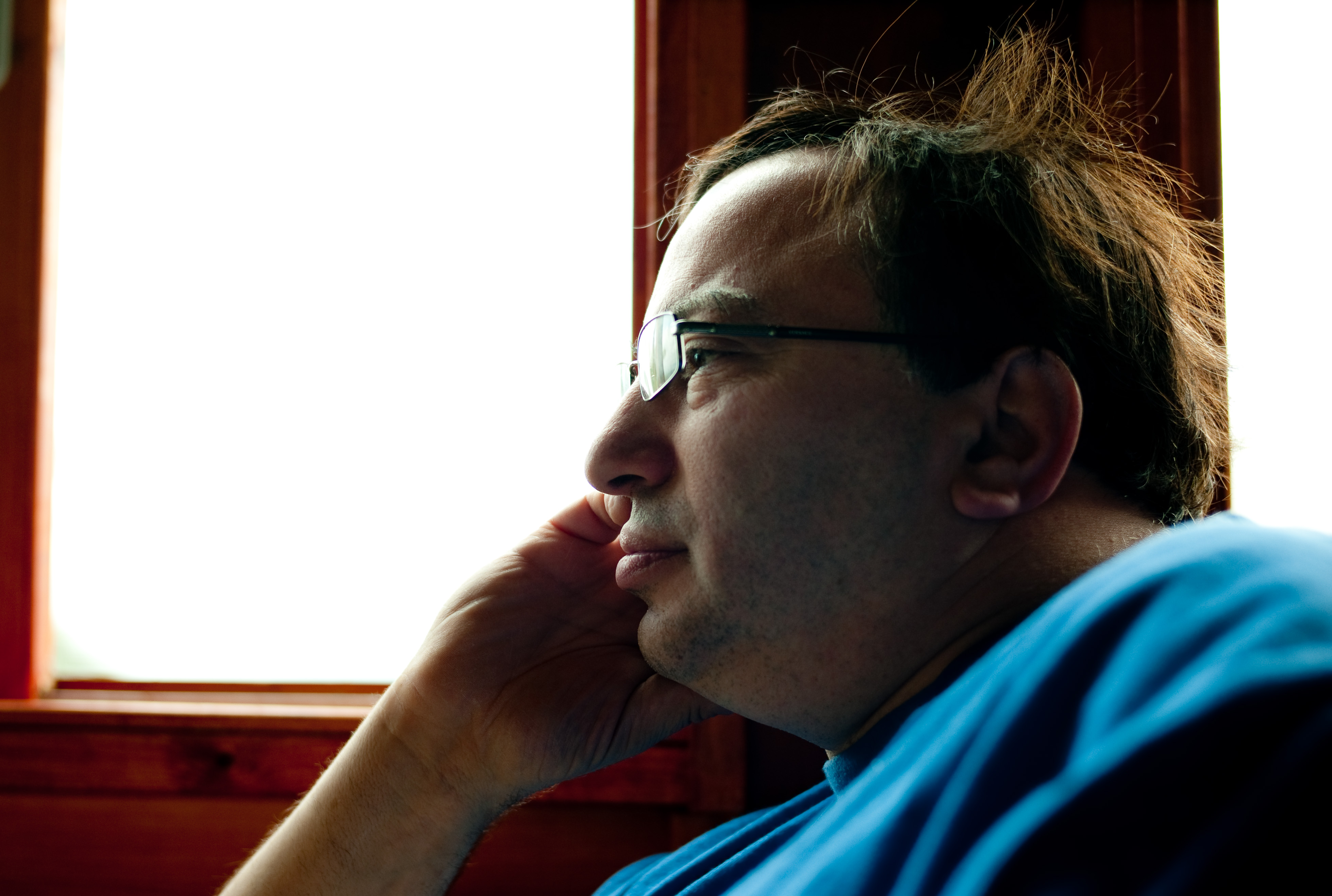
- Seckel in 2009
- Born: Alfred Paul Seckel; September 3, 1958; New York City, U.S.
- Died: 2015 (aged 56–57); Saint-Cirq-Lapopie, Lot, France
- Education: Cornell University (no degree)
- Occupations: Writer; scientific skeptic
- Known for: Popularizer of optical illusions
- Spouses: Laura Mullen (m. 1980, divorced) Denice D. Lewis (m. 2004, separated) Alice Klarke (until 2007)
- Partners: Isabel Maxwell (2007–2015; his death)
- Mother: Ruth Schonthal

Alfred Paul Seckel (September 3, 1958 – 2015) was an American collector and popularizer of visual and other types of sensory illusions, who wrote books about them. Active in the Freethought movement as a skeptic in the 1980s, he was the co-founder and executive director of the Southern California Skeptics. News coverage arising from his connection to Jeffrey Epstein has stressed Seckel's misrepresentation of his education and credentials. In 2010, Seckel provided reputation management services for Epstein. He died in France in 2015.

== Early life ==
Seckel was born September 3, 1958, in New York City, New York to Paul Bernard Seckel, a German-born painter and graphic artist, and Ruth Schonthal, a German-born pianist and classical composer. His mother was a refugee from the Nazis. Seckel was Jewish, and raised in a Jewish household. He grew up in New Rochelle, New York, with his two brothers. Seckel graduated from New Rochelle High School in 1976. He attended Cornell University from 1976 to 1978 but left without receiving a degree.

In 1981, Seckel moved to the Los Angeles metropolitan area, where he lived for nearly thirty years.

== Career ==
=== Freethought movement ===
Throughout the 1980s, Seckel was active in the Freethought movement and generated a number of articles and pamphlets. He also edited two books on the English rationalist philosopher Bertrand Russell. In 1983, Seckel and John Edwards co-created the Darwin fish design, which was first sold as a bumper sticker and on T-shirts in 1983–84 by a southern California group called Atheists United. Chris Gilman, a Hollywood prop maker, began to manufacture plastic car ornaments with the Darwin fish in 1990, and licensed the design to Evolution Design of Austin, Texas. When the emblem evolved into a million-dollar business, Evolution Design threatened to sue distributors of look-alike and derivative products. Seckel in turn sued Evolution Design for copyright infringement. Although Seckel produced examples of the design that predated Gilman's 1990 copyright date, the suit was settled when it was determined that Seckel and Edwards had allowed the design to fall into public domain.

In 1984, Seckel started the Southern California Skeptics (SCS) and became a spokesperson for science and its relationship to the paranormal. SCS co-sponsored and produced a monthly series of lectures, primarily held at the California Institute of Technology, with other meetings occasionally held on the campus of Cal State Fullerton, that explained alleged paranormal phenomena such as extra-sensory perception and firewalking. Seckel was the founder and executive director of SCS. An article published in New Scientist in 1985 states that the Southern California Skeptics were "the fastest growing chapter of the Committee for the Scientific Investigation of Claims of the Paranormal (CSICOP)". Author George P. Hansen, in an article published in 1992, stated that incidents involving Seckel had embarrassed CSICOP because "he did not hold the academic credentials he claimed."

The Southern California Skeptics dissolved after the late 1980s. In 1991, Michael Shermer and Pat Linse co-founded a new Los Angeles-area skeptical group called The Skeptics Society after the Southern California Skeptics had disbanded.

=== Optical illusions ===
Seckel was "a leading collector and popularizer" of optical illusions.

In 1994, he created an interactive website on illusions. He also developed visual illusion installations for museums.

Seckel's books about optical illusions include several picture books for children such as Ambiguous Illusions (2005), Action Optical Illusions (2005) and Stereo Optical Illusions (2006).

His book, Masters of Deception: Escher, Dali, and the Artists of Optical Illusion (2004), collects the work of many visual illusion artists, including among others Giuseppe Arcimboldo (1527–1593), Salvador Dalí (1904–1989), M. C. Escher (1898–1972), and Rex Whistler (1905–1944). His book The Art of Optical Illusions placed first on the American Library Association's "Top 10 Quick Picks for Reluctant Young Adult Readers" list for 2001.

He gave many lectures about such illusions, including an early TED talk (2004) and a talk at the World Economic Forum, Davos in 2011.

== Other activities ==
=== Rare book investment and sales ===
During the late 1990s, Seckel collected scientific papers of a number of early molecular biologists (including Rosalind Franklin, Aaron Klug, Max Perutz, Rollin Hotchkiss, and Sven Furberg) for rare-book dealer Jeremy Norman. At the time they were collected, the market value of the archive was unknown as many institutions did not have an interest in keeping the archives of scientists' papers.

Seckel and Norman attempted to purchase the papers of Francis Crick but were unsuccessful. After the Wellcome Trust bought Crick's papers in 2001 for $2.4 million, Norman pursued individual sale of the items in his collection through Christie's. A lawsuit prevented the individual sale of the items by Norman. Seckel and Norman had a falling out and cross-sued each other. The lawsuits were later dismissed. According to Seckel, the sale was canceled because of his extensive documentation that was brought to the attention of Christie's. Although former colleagues and associates of James Watson and Crick attempted to raise the asking price of $3.2 million in an effort to have the collection donated to the Cold Spring Harbor Laboratory, the collection was eventually acquired by the J. Craig Venter Institute, before finally being purchased by the Science History Institute in Philadelphia which began to offer visitor access to the items in September 2025.

=== Lawsuits and disputes ===
Seckel was sued on several occasions after disputes over rare-book investment and sales.

In a San Diego Reader article from 1994, Tom McIver (author of Anti-Evolution: An Annotated Bibliography) accused Seckel of failing to disclose financial information as leader of the Southern California Skeptics and misrepresenting his academic credentials. Seckel later sued McIver for libel over edits to his Wikipedia page. The suit was settled in 2007 under undisclosed terms.

A 2015 profile of Seckel in Tablet magazine by Mark Oppenheimer detailed several first-person accounts from individuals who reported that Seckel still owed them money including the widow of one of his mentors, his lawyer, a graduate student, and those who had engaged in rare book deals. The article stated that there were at least 25 cases involving Seckel from 1992 to 2015 in the Los Angeles Superior Court database. Oppenheimer reported that Seckel cultivated a false image, both with personal contacts and within the media, of himself as a graduate from Cornell with degrees in physics and math, as an affiliate of and candidate for doctoral degrees at Caltech, and as a scientist conducting research in conjunction with colleagues at Harvard University. Some of these inaccuracies were published in media coverage of Seckel, including in the Los Angeles Times in 1985 and 1987.

Seckel was later accused of absconding with over $500,000.

=== Collaboration with Jeffrey Epstein ===
In 2009, Seckel was involved in organizing a science conference with financier and convicted sex offender Jeffrey Epstein. The Mindshift conference took place in early 2011 on Epstein's private island Little Saint James and at a hotel in the US Virgin Islands. In attendance were scientists Murray Gell-Mann, Leonard Mlodinow, Gerald Sussman, and Frances Arnold, in addition to the actor and cryptocurrency proponent Brock Pierce. Seckel charged Epstein $25,000 for organizing the conference.

An interview between Jeffrey Epstein and Al Seckel discussing perception appeared on Epstein's science website on October 17, 2010.

Emails released by the US Congress in November 2025 show that in 2010 Seckel discussed reputation management with Epstein. Seckel charged him tens of thousands of US dollars for search engine optimisation, including downranking stories about his conviction and removing "toxic suggested search engine terms", and making edits to the Wikipedia article about him. Seckel worked to broaden Epstein's pool of reputation managers, describing in an email to one contractor that his goal was to "build a very positive humanitarian successful presence for Jeff that is pervasive on the web". By late 2010, Seckel told Epstein he had removed his mugshot from his Wikipedia page and replaced it with a more favorable image, removed content regarding Epstein's criminal activity, and inserted a large amount of information about his philanthropy.

== Personal life ==
Seckel married Laura Mullen in 1980; their daughter Elizabeth was born in 1987. Mullen and Seckel later divorced. His second marriage was to Denice D. Lewis in 2004 in Las Vegas, Nevada: it was never annulled. Seckel married for a third time to Alice Klarke; the union was dissolved in 2007. Seckel became involved with Isabel Maxwell from 2007 until his death in France in 2015. Actu.fr stated that Seckel never formally divorced Klarke.

Around 2010, Seckel and Maxwell moved to France, reportedly to care for Maxwell's mother in Meyreuil. Seckel and Maxwell later lived near La Roque-Gageac. Le Figaro newspaper wrote that it was unclear as of February 2026 whether Seckel had French citizenship.

On July 1, 2015, Seckel's body was reportedly found at the bottom of a cliff near his home, in Saint-Cirq-Lapopie. His body was in an advanced state of decomposition, with a hand and foot missing, presumably eaten by wildlife. Seckel is thought to have been dead for several weeks before the discovery, having been last seen after renting a car in Brive-la-Gaillarde. Seckel's death certificate was made public in 2022, listing the cause of death as suicide, described by France 3 as a suicide by jumping.

== Bibliography ==
- Science and the Paranormal. SCS Publishing (1987)
- Bertrand Russell on God and Religion. (Seckel, editor), Prometheus Books (1986) ISBN 0-87975-323-4
- Bertrand Russell on Sex, Marriage, and Morals. (Seckel, editor), Prometheus Books (1987) ISBN 0-87975-400-1
- The Art of Optical Illusions. Carlton Books (2000) ISBN 1-84222-054-3
- Great Book of Optical Illusions. Firefly Books (2004) ISBN 1-55297-650-5
- Masters of Deception: Escher, Dali, and the Artists of Optical Illusion. Sterling Books (2004) ISBN 1-4027-0577-8
- Incredible Visual Illusions. (with Rebecca Panayiotou and Tessa Rose, editors), Arcturus Books (2005) ISBN 1-84193-197-7
- Action Optical Illusions. Sterling Books (2005) ISBN 1-4027-1828-4
- Impossible Optical Illusions. Sterling Books (2005) ISBN 1-4027-1830-6
- Stereo Optical Illusions. Sterling Books (2006) ISBN 1-4027-1833-0
- Optical Illusions: The Science of Visual Perception. Firefly Books (2006) ISBN 1-55407-172-0
