= Ruben Liljefors =

Swedish composer and conductor

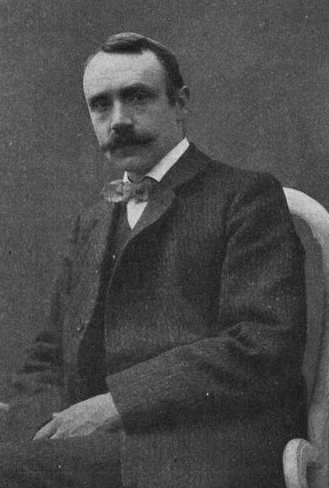

Ruben Mattias Liljefors (30 September 1871 – 4 March 1936) was a Swedish composer and conductor, brother of the artist Bruno Liljefors.

== Life ==
Liljefors was born and died in Uppsala. He also studied in Uppsala with Ivar Eggert Hedenblad until 1895, and subsequently in Leipzig with Salomon Jadassohn until 1899. Later he attended the Stockholm Conservatory. He completed his education with Felix Draeseke, Max Reger, and Hermann Ludwig Kutzschbach. From 1902 to 1911, he conducted the choir and orchestra of the Gothenburg Philharmonic Society. Afterwards, he moved to Gävle to conduct the Gävleborg County Orchestra between 1912 and 1931; he also served as a music teacher at the Gävle higher general secondary school during this time.

He composed a symphony, a concert overture, a festival overture, an orchestral suite, a piano concerto, a violin sonata, many choral works and songs. One of his best-known pieces is the Swedish Christmas carol När det lider mot jul. His son, Ingemar Liljefors, was also a successful composer, and his grandson, Mats Liljefors, is a well known conductor and violinist.

== Works (selection) ==
=== Orchestra ===
- Overture in C Minor, WoO (1897)
- Symphony in E flat Major, Op. 14 (1906; recorded)
- Suite Fritjof & Ingeborg, Op. 17 (1916)
- Suite Summer (1919)
- Festive Overture (1922)
- Three Bagatelles for String Orchestra (1925)
- Four Small Folk Pieces (1931)
- Festspiel in E flat major (1931)
- Suite for String Orchestra (1933)

=== Concertante works ===
- Piano Concerto in F minor, Op. 5 (1898; recorded)
- Romance for Violin and Orchestra (1918)

=== Choral works with orchestra ===
- Song at the dedication of the repaired building of the Uppland Nation (T. Tullberg), for male choir (1902)
- Flower Festival (C. Snoilsky), soprano and alto solo, mixed choir and orchestra (1907)
- Cantata for the inauguration of Gothenburg University's new Academy Building (A. U. Bååth) soprano, baritone, and tenor solo, mixed choir, male choir, and orchestra (1907)
- Bohuslän, Anniversary at the 250-year anniversary of the Peace of Roskilde (E. Evers), solo, mixed choir and organ (1908)
- Cantata for Heimdal's 40-year anniversary (S.H.T.-kantat, Bååth), male choir and piano (1908)
- Hymn for the Lambert Fair (E. A. Karlfeldt), mixed choir and orchestra (1908)
- Cantata for the inauguration of the Gävle Polytechnic's Refurbishment (M. Sterner), tenor solo, mixed choir, blandad kör, boy's choir and orchestra (1914)
- For the Home District (H. Hamilton), baritone solo, mixed choir and orchestra (1914)

=== Chamber music ===
Violin Sonata in E major, Op. 2 (1895)

=== Piano music ===
- Menuett, WoO (1886)
- Wedding March (for his brother Carl's wedding, 1893)
- Four Preludes and Fugues ( 1898)
- Three Melodies (Nos. 1–2, 1899)
- Mazurka in F minor
- From the Sketchbook (1914)
- Sonata in F Minor (1925)
- Moment Musical (1928)

=== Dramatic works ===
- Hans Höghet, operetta after Fritz Reuter (1908)
- Music for E. Hörman's Fritjof och Ingeborg for solos, choir and orchestra (1908)
- Marionette Overture for the Dock Theater at Stockholm's National Exhibition (1909)
- Mr. Alarik's Wedding (1910)
