= Ingemar Liljefors =

Swedish musician (1906–1981)

Ingmar Kristian Liljefors (13 December 1906 – 14 October 1981) was a Swedish composer, pianist, writer on music, and music educator. Born in Gothenburg, Liljefors was the son of composer and conductor Ruben Liljefors. His own son, Mats Liljefors, is a successful conductor.

In 1933 Liljefors co-founded Fylkingen, a society for experimental music and arts. He served as the first Chairman of that organisation from 1933–1946. He was also the Chairman of Föreningen Svenska Tonsättare (English: Association of Swedish Composers) from 1947–1963. In 1958 he was named a member of the Royal Swedish Academy of Music. He taught music composition, harmony and piano for many years at the Royal College of Music, Stockholm where he was appointed full professor in 1968. One of his pupils was composer Ruth Schönthal. He died in Stockholm in 1981 at the age of 74.

In addition to teaching in the classroom, Liljefors also wrote several music theory textbooks which were used by many music schools in his native country. These included Harmonilärans grunder med ackordanalys enligt funktionsteorien (C.A.V. Lundberg, 1937), Harmonisk analys enligt funktionsteorien (C. A. V. Lundholm, 1951), Romantisk harmonik ur pedagogisk synvinkel (Nordiska Musikförlaget, 1969), and Harmonik och sats: Schubert till Ravel (Erika, 1976). As a composer, his output included an opera, a symphony, several works for string orchestra, a piano and a violin concerto, a concertino, a rhapsody for piano and orchestra, many solo piano pieces and songs, and numerous chamber music works. His compositions were characterized by their use of elements of Swedish folk music, particularly with regard to rhythm.
