= Judicial Consent =

- Directed by: William Bindley
- Written by: William Bindley
- Produced by: Douglas Curtis; Mark W. Koch
- Starring: Bonnie Bedelia; Billy Wirth; Lisa Blount; Will Patton; Dabney Coleman; Kevin McCarthy
- Cinematography: James Glennon
- Edited by: William Hoy
- Music by: Christopher Young
- Production company: Prelude Pictures
- Distributed by: Rysher Entertainment
- Release date: October 21, 1994 (Hamptons)
- Running time: 101 minutes
- Country: United States
- Language: English

Judicial Consent is a 1994 American thriller film written and directed by William Bindley and starring Bonnie Bedelia, Billy Wirth, Lisa Blount, Will Patton and Dabney Coleman.

The plot is

== Cast ==
- Bonnie Bedelia as Gwen Warwick
- Will Patton as Alan Warwick
- Dabney Coleman as Charles Mayron
- Billy Wirth as Martin
- Lisa Blount as District Attorney
- Kevin McCarthy as Judge Pollan

== Release ==
The film was released on October 21, 1994 at the Hamptons International Film Festival.

== Reception ==
Caren Weiner Campbell of Entertainment Weekly graded the film a B.
