= Anthony Addabbo =

American actor and model (1960–2016)

- Born: Anthony Mark Addabbo; September 14, 1960; Coral Gables, Florida, U.S.
- Died: October 18, 2016 (aged 56); Norfolk, Virginia, U.S.
- Education: Virginia Tech
- Occupations: Actor; model
- Years active: 1987–2016
- Spouse: Hildellizza Pattino (m. 1999; div. 2004)
- Children: 1

Anthony Mark Addabbo (September 14, 1960 – October 18, 2016) was an American actor and model. He was best known for playing the roles of Jason Craig on Generations (1989 to 1991), Jonny and Rush Carrera on The Bold and the Beautiful (1997 to 1998), Jim Lemay on Guiding Light (1999 to 2000), and Dimitri Marick on All My Children (2001).

== Early life ==
Addabbo was born in Coral Gables, Florida and raised in Virginia Beach, Virginia. He was the middle child, with three sisters and one brother. He attended Virginia Tech, but he decided to leave school to work as a tree surgeon. He also worked as a waiter. Addabbo eventually moved back home and became a salesman, selling encyclopedias door to door.

== Career ==
While he was working as a salesman, Addabbo's friends suggested that he try modeling. He brought photos of himself to a local modeling agency and started getting jobs. He was spotted by a representative from the Zoli Agency in New York and decided to move to the city. Soon after, he modeled for a photo spread in GQ, shot by Bruce Weber. Actor Hank Cheyne also appeared in the photoshoot. Addabbo was then signed to Elite Model Management.

Addabbo began auditioning for acting roles in the mid-1980s. He was cast as Matt Everett in the television film The Gunfighters (1987). He also appeared in the television film Nightingales (1988), the pilot for an Aaron Spelling series that aired on NBC. Addabbo briefly appeared on General Hospital before being cast as Jason Craig on the NBC soap opera Generations in 1989. He played the role until the show's final episodes aired in 1991.

From 1990 to 1991, Addabbo guest starred on Life Goes On, Cheers, and Dallas. In 1991, he had a regular role as Michael Torres on the series Dangerous Women. In 1992, he played Nick in the television film Calendar Girl, Cop, Killer?: The Bambi Bembenek Story. From 1992 to 1996, Addabbo made recurring appearances on the Showtime series Red Shoe Diaries.

Addabbo made guest appearances on Wings and Renegade in 1993. He starred in the television film Love on the Run (1994). He guest starred on Silk Stalkings in 1994. Addabbo guest starred on Diagnosis: Murder and Hudson Street in 1995. He played Matt Munro in the film Who Killed Buddy Blue? (1995). He appeared in the television film Red Shoe Diaries 5: Weekend Pass (1995).

In 1996, Addabbo guest starred on High Tide, The Nanny, The Client, and Pacific Blue. He played Billy Bob in Barefoot in Paradise, a pilot that didn't go forward. He made another guest appearance on Silk Stalkings in 1997. From 1997 to 1998, Addabbo played brothers Jonny Carrera and Tony 'Rush' Carrera on the CBS soap opera The Bold and the Beautiful.

He played Gabe Reese in the film Black Sea 213 (1998) and Billy in the film A Place Called Truth (1998). In 1999, he was cast as Jim Lemay, the father of Susan Lemay (Brittany Snow), on the CBS soap opera Guiding Light. He played the role until 2000. Addabbo was cast on the ABC soap opera All My Children in 2001, playing Dimitri Marick. He replaced Michael Nader in the role.

In 2001, he co-starred with his Guiding Light castmates Beth Ehlers, Justin Deas, and Kurt McKinney in a short film, Supertalk. He played Frank in the film My One and Only (2009). In 2012, Addabbo appeared in the television film Hornet's Nest.

== Personal life and death ==
On June 7, 1999, Addabbo married Elli Pattino. They had a son, born on December 11, 1998.

He died on October 18, 2016. His cause of death wasn't disclosed to the public.

== Filmography ==
=== Film ===
Year	Title	Role	Notes
1992	Inside Out IV	Kenner	
1994	Red Shoe Diaries: Hotline	Harry	Television film
1995	Who Killed Buddy Blue?	Matt Munro	
1995	Red Shoe Diaries 5: Weekend Pass	Eddie Edwards	Television film
1998	Black Sea 213	Gabe Reese	
1998	A Place Called Truth	Billy	
2001	Supertalk		Short film
2009	My One and Only	Frank	

=== Television ===
Year	Title	Role	Notes
1987	The Gunfighters	Matt Everett	Television film Credited as Tony Addabbo
1988	Nightingales		Television film
1988–1990	Paradise	Derick Nielson	Contract role
1989–1991	Generations	Jason Craig	Contract role
1990	Life Goes On	Brian Green	Episode: "The Bicycle Thief"
1991	Dallas	John; Jeff Peters	2 episodes
1991	Dangerous Women	Michael Torres	Contract role
1991	Cheers	Frankie	Episode: "Get Your Kicks on Route 666"
1992	Calendar Girl, Cop, Killer?: The Bambi Bembenek Story	Nick	Television film
1992	Dangerous Curves	Carlos Lorenzo	Episode: "Triangle"
1992; 1993; 1995; 1996	Red Shoe Diaries	Eddie Edwards; Harry; Billy Bar; Gabriel; Kit	6 episodes
1993	Renegade	Sergeant Tommy Vin	Episode: "Val's Song"
1993	Wings	GQ Guy	Episode: "Another Wedding"
1994	Love on the Run		Television film
1994; 1997	Silk Stalkings	Derek McNeill / Devin; Nino Cunnetto	2 episodes
1995	Diagnosis: Murder	Clete Kinley	Episode: "Call Me Incontestable"
1995	High Sierra Search and Rescue	Claude Gavin	Episode: "Mozart & Stone"
1995	Hudson Street	Doug	Episode: "Bells & Whistles"
1996	High Tide	Romero	Episode: "Beach Blanket Werewolf"
1996	Pacific Blue	Mackie Smith	2 episodes
1996	The Client	Sam Redman	Episode: "Past Imperfect"
1996	The Nanny	Mike LaVoe	Episode: "The Hockey Show"
1996	Barefoot in Paradise	Billy Bob	Unaired pilot
1997–1998	The Bold and the Beautiful	Tony 'Rush' Carrera / Jonny Carerra	Contract role
1998	Oh Baby	Possible No. 592	Episode: "Picking a Donor"
1999–2000	Guiding Light	Jim Lemay	Contract role
2001	All My Children	Dimitri Marick	Contract role
2009	Body Politic	Senator Sandoval	Unaired pilot
2009	Washingtonienne	Marcus	Unaired pilot
2011	Homeland	Patrolman	Episode: "Marine One"
2012	One Tree Hill	Investor No. 1	Episode: "Love the Way You Lie"
2012	Hornet's Nest	Agent James	Television film
2013	The Surgeon General	Colonel Pitts	Unaired pilot
2013	Company Town	Admiral Laskow	Unaired pilot
