= Billy Wirth =

American actor

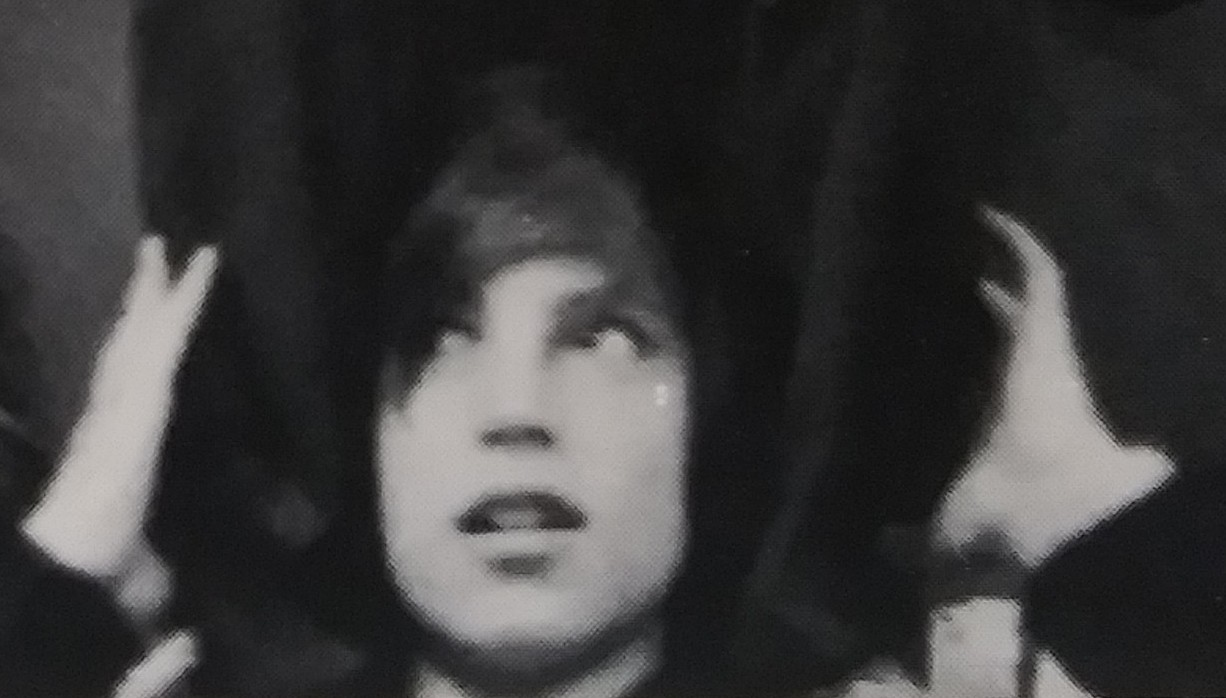
- Wirth in 1975
- Born: William E. Wirth; June 23, 1962 (age 64); New York City, New York, U.S.
- Occupations: Actor; model
- Years active: 1985–present
- Height: 1.77 m (5 ft 10 in)

William E. “Billy” Wirth (born June 23, 1962) is an American actor, film producer, and former fashion model, best known for his role as the vampire Dwayne in the 1987 horror film The Lost Boys.

== Life and career ==
Wirth was born on June 23, 1962 in New York City, in the United States. He was the son of Morris A. Wirth an American who was of Russian-Jewish background, who worked as a lawyer, while his mother Jean Wirth was a visual artist. His mother Jean, who was born in the state of Iowa, is of Anglo-American and Native American heritage.

Wirth was a student at Collegiate School (New York), where he was a classmate of musician John Hermann, and attended Brown University where he was discovered by fashion model photographer Bruce Weber, and soon began a modeling career. He modeled for American and European fashion magazines such as Seventeen, GQ, Interview, Teen magazines and took part in fashion show events in the 1980s. Wirth originally worked as a fashion model until he gave up on fashion and turned to Hollywood acting.

Wirth moved to Los Angeles, California in the mid 1980s to pursue an acting career, which began with a role in the 1985 feature film, Seven Minutes in Heaven. His performance as Dwayne in The Lost Boys followed, and he landed a starring role in the 1988 film War Party.

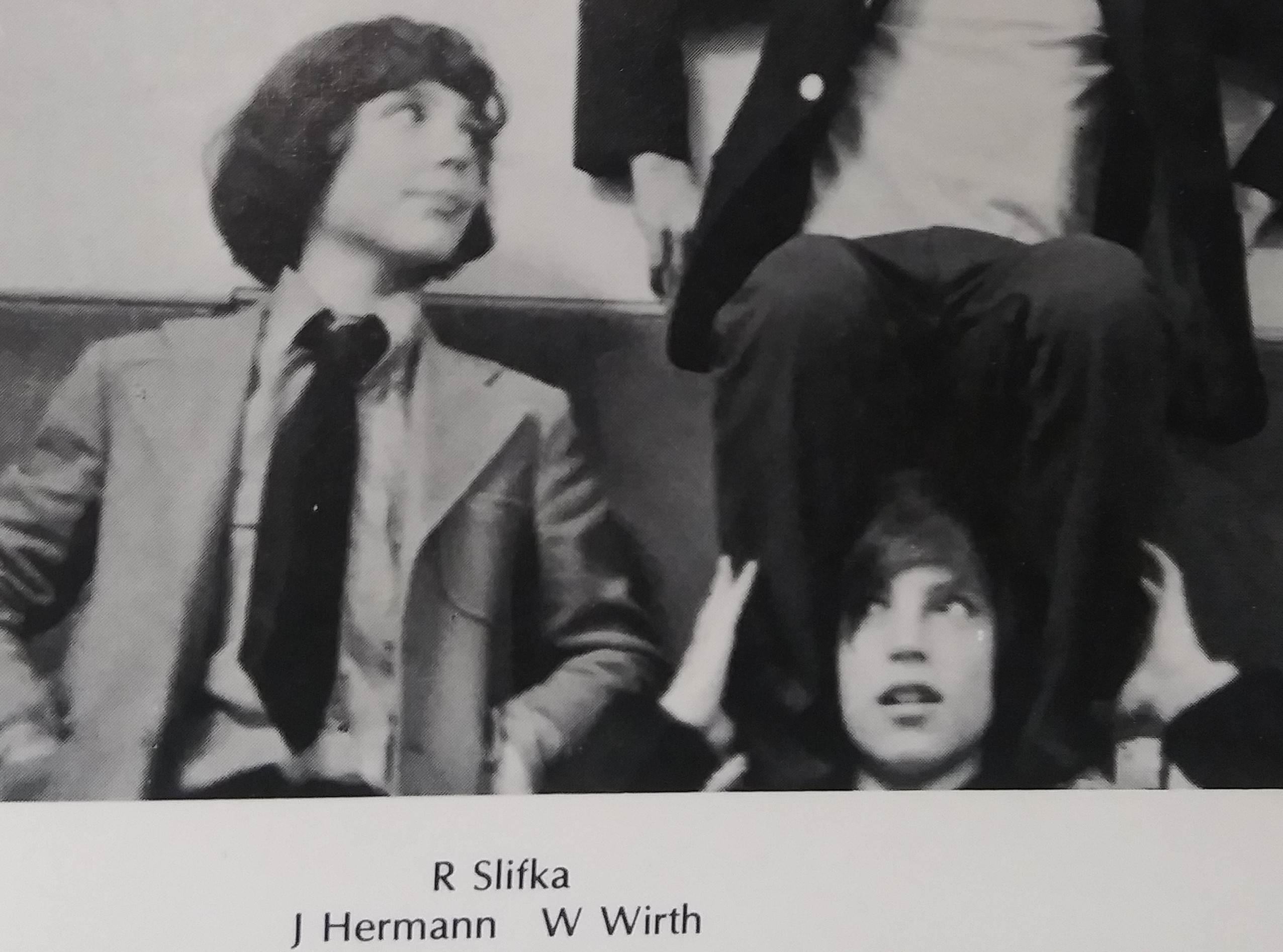
John Hermann (left), Wirth (bottom right) and a classmate in 1975

Wirth continued modeling combining it with acting, until he walked away from the fashion industry in the early 1990s, to dedicate his time to full-time acting. In the 1990s he appeared in both film and television, appearing in Abel Ferrara's 1993 film Body Snatchers as well as Sex and the City and CSI. He took part in the global-hit television game show American Gladiators, competing during the series' first season in 1989 and advancing to the first-half semi-finals before failing to win the title.

He also appeared in the official Electric Crown music video by the American heavy metal band, Testament in 1992.

He also starred in Charmed as the warlock, Matthew Tate. Since 1999, besides acting in films, he has been writing, directing, and producing independent films. His most notable film directing was MacArthur Park in 2001.

== Filmography ==
=== Film ===
Billy Wirth film credits
Year	Title	Role	Notes
1985	Seven Minutes in Heaven	"Zoo" Knudsen	
1987	The Lost Boys	Dwayne	
1988	War Party	Sonny Crowkiller	
1992	Who Killed the Baby Jesus	Travis Adams	
1993	Body Snatchers	Tim Young	
1994	The Fence	Terry Griff	
1994	Judicial Consent	Martin	
1994	Final Mission	Tom "Outlaw" Waters	Video
1995	Venus Rising	Nick	
1995	Boys on the Side	Nick	
1996	Starlight	Kieran	
1996	Space Marines	Zack Delano	
1997	Last Lives	Malakai	
1998	Relax... It's Just Sex	Jared Bartoziak	
1999	Kismet	Fantasy Guy	Short. Director
1999	Me and Will	Charlie	
2001	American Reunion	Brad	
2002	Looking for Jimmy	Billy	
2004	The Talent Given Us	Billy	
2004	The Drone Virus	Stephen Roland	
2006	Seven Mummies	Travis	
2006	Running Out of Time in Hollywood	Billy	
2009	Powder Blue	David	
2009	Duress	The Detective	
2012	Being Flynn	Travis	
2014	Echoes	Joe	
2015	Cats Dancing on Jupiter	Oleg	
2015	Midlife	Brian	
2015	Alto	Ceasar Bellafusco	
2018	Betrayed	Mike Wolf	
2019	Hell to Pay	Killian	Short film
2019	Eternal Code	Mark Pellegrini	

=== Television ===
Billy Wirth television credits
Year	Title	Role	Notes
1985	The Equalizer	Ralph	Episode: "Mama's Boy"
1986	The Ellen Burstyn Show	Johnny	Episode: "Pilot"
1987	Nothing in Common	Joey D.	
1989	American Gladiators	Contestant / Himself	3 episodes
1989	Wiseguy	Eddie Tempest	Episodes: "The Rip-Off Stick", "High Dollar Bop", "Hip Hop on the Gravy Train"
1990	Parker Kane	Jesse	TV movie
1991	Tales from the Crypt	Ted Morgan	Episode: "Split Second"
1992	Crow's Nest	Tommy Crosetti	TV movie
1992	Red Shoe Diaries	Thomas K. Butler, The Workman	TV movie
1995	Children of the Dust	Corby / White Wolf	TV movie
1998	Martial Law	Kevin Seidel	Episode: "Extreme Measures"
1998	Charmed	Matthew Tate	Episode: "The Witch Is Back"
2000	Sex and the City	Dr. Mark Raskin	Episode: "Drama Queens"
2004	CSI: Crime Scene Investigation	Aaron Westonson	Episode: "Eleven Angry Jurors"
2005	Summerland	Garrett	Episode: "The Wisdom to Know the Difference"
2011	Law & Order: Criminal Intent	Billy Gray	Episode: "To the Boy in the Blue Knit Cap"
2014	Chicago PD	Charlie Pugliese	Season 1 Episode 13, 14, & 15
2015	Scorpion	Mark Willis	Episode: "Area 51"
2018	Space Diner Tales	Souldbird	Episode: "Pilot"
2019	Godfather of Harlem	Detective Kramer	Episode: "The Nitty Gritty"

== Awards ==
Sundance Film Festival

Year	Award	Category/Recipient	Result
2001	Grand Jury Prize	Dramatic for: MacArthur Park	Nominated

Taos Talking Picture Festival

Year	Award	Category/Recipient	Result
2001	Taos Land Grant Award	for: MacArthur Park	Nominated
