= Red Shoe Diaries =

American television series

- The cover for one of the DVD releases
- Genre: Anthology; Erotic drama
- Created by: Zalman King; Patricia Louisianna Knop
- Composer: George S. Clinton
- Country of origin: United States
- Original language: English
- No. of seasons: 5
- No. of episodes: 66 (+ 1 television film)

Production
- Executive producers: Zalman King; Patricia Louisianna Knop; David Saunders
- Producers: Yoram Barzilai; Lori Bridwell; Gaspard de Chavagnac; David Dwiggins; Anatoly Fradis; Avram "Butch" Kaplan; Chloe King; Jordan Leibert; Aladdin Pojhan; Jeff Young
- Running time: 30 minutes
- Production companies: The Zalman King Company; Showtime Networks

Original release
- Network: Showtime
- Release: June 27, 1992 – June 1, 1997

Red Shoe Diaries is an American erotic drama anthology series that aired on Showtime from June 27, 1992 to June 1, 1997, and was distributed by Playboy Entertainment, but as of 2025, Paramount Global Content Distribution overseas. It is a spin-off of the television film of the same name directed by Zalman King. Most episodes were directed by either King or Rafael Eisenman.

Episodes usually have a plot revolving around romantic intrigue and the sexual awakening of a woman who often also narrates. Sensuous love scenes with nudity as well as sultry, moody music are characteristic for most episodes. Each episode was introduced by the character Jake Winters (David Duchovny, reprising his film role) in a frame story of soliciting stories from women via a newspaper advertisement. But otherwise each episode was a standalone production, with no recurring characters or story arcs.

== Premise ==
Jake Winters (David Duchovny) places an ad in the newspaper under "Red Shoes", seeking women to mail in their personal diaries with stories of love, passion, and/or betrayal. He is then shown walking on desolate train tracks with his dog, Stella. He begins reading a letter from his post office box out loud that begins with "Dear Red Shoes..." In the pilot film, Jake lost his fiancée to suicide and discovered she kept a diary detailing an affair she had with a construction worker and shoe salesman who sold her a pair of red high heels. He placed the ad in the newspaper in an effort to make sense of his fiancée's secret life through the stories of women in similar situations. Each episode is devoted to a woman's story Jake receives, and begins and ends with Jake's comments to Stella.

== Production ==
Zalman King conceived of an erotic television series that would air on premium cable, which was then a burgeoning market as it was not beholden to MPAA ratings. With his wife and collaborator Patricia Louisianna Knop, King wrote the script for the television film Red Shoe Diaries, intending it to be the pilot for the anthology series. The film, in conjunction with four episodes, was pitched to Showtime in 1991.

Said King: "I wanted to do an anthology series from a very intimate, woman's point of view." He dismissed the term softcore to categorize his work because of its pornographic connotations, saying, "Eroticism has a real place in my vocabulary because [it] usually needs to move out of a relationship or some sort of tension and that's what I'm very interested in. I usually think of my work as romance." Producer David Saunders said, "We weren't interested in making porn. We wanted to make erotic movies with good stories that looked great, were well-acted, and that concerned women as well as men. Showtime's interests and our interests coincided." Of the show's content, writer Chloe King said, "It's not wham-bam thank you ma’am. There's more intellectual than physical foreplay." Lizzie Borden, Anne Goursaud, Mary Lambert, Nelly Alard, and Elise D'Haene were among the female writers and directors on the show.

David Duchovny was cast in The X-Files as FBI agent Fox Mulder shortly after agreeing to appear in the Red Shoe TV film. Though his Red Shoe character Jake Winters's narrative is continued in the episode entitled "Jake's Story", he mostly appears as the series's narrator, bookending each episode. Because of the success of X-Files in Germany on RTLII, the same broadcaster bought distribution rights and renamed it "Foxy Fantasies", which apparently is intended to create the impression these episodes show the fantasies of Fox Mulder.

Episodes were mostly filmed in Canoga Park in the San Fernando Valley. Later locations included Rio de Janeiro, Brazil, and Ciudad Juárez, Mexico.

== Episodes ==
=== Season 1 (1992) ===
No. overall	No. in season	Title	Directed by	Written by	Original release date
1	1	"Safe Sex"	Zalman King	Melanie Finn, Henry Cobbold	June 27, 1992
A man and a woman decide to have a no-strings-attached affair after sharing a cab together. Cast: Steven Bauer, Joan Severance, John Toles-Bey
2	2	"Double Dare"	Tibor Takács	Rod McCall, Merle Worth	July 18, 1992
An advertising executive begins a flirtation with a man who works in the office building across from her. Cast: Laura Johnson, Arnold Vosloo, Scott Lawrence, Michael Woods
3	3	"You Have the Right to Remain Silent"	Zalman King	Zalman King, Rafael Eisenman, Henry Cobbold	August 8, 1992
A female police officer gets a stranger's attention by arresting him. Cast: Denise Crosby, Robert Knepper, Pat Banta
4	4	"Talk to Me Baby"	Rafael Eisenman	Zalman King	August 22, 1992
After his girlfriend Elaine catches him cheating on her, Bud looks for excitement in reckless driving. Cast: Richard Tyson, Lydie Denier, Kim Burnette, Peter Spellos
5	5	"Just Like That"	Ted Kotcheff	Chloe King	April 17, 1993
Trudie, an aspiring lawyer, finds herself drawn between two men who are complete opposites. Cast: Nina Siemaszko, Matt LeBlanc, Carl Gilliard, Tchéky Karyo, Victoria Mahoney, Renata Scott
6	6	"Another Woman's Lipstick"	Zalman King	Ed Silverstein	May 13, 1993
After discovering her husband is having an affair, Zoe dresses up as a man to catch her husband and uncover the identity of his mistress. Cast: Maryam d'Abo, Christina Fulton, Annabelle Gurwitch, Kevin Haley, Miranda Garrison
7	7	"Auto Erotica"	Zalman King	Ned Bowman	May 29, 1993
Claudia is challenged to a high speed chase through the empty streets by a handsome pedestrian. Cast: Nick Chinlund, Caitlin Dulany
8	8	"Jake's Story"	Michael Karbelnikoff	Ed Silverstein	July 10, 1993
Several months after the events of the film, Jake is approached by a mysterious woman at the diner who takes him along to one of her photo shoots and shows him a possible way out of his grief. Cast: Sheryl Lee, David Duchovny, William Paul Burns, Angela Cornell, Audie England, Frederick Washburn
9	9	"Accidents Happen" a.k.a. "The Fling"	Alan Smithee (Note: Mary Lambert directed the episode, but due to creative differences with Zalman King had her name removed, and is credited under the pseudonym Alan Smithee.)	Laurie Frank, Patricia Louisianna Knop	May 15, 1993
An Italian maid finds the private home videos of her employers. Cast: Ally Sheedy, Marina Giulia Cavalli, Scott Plank
10	10	"Bounty Hunter"	Peter Care	David Codikow, Melanie Finn (story)	May 1993
Evan, a bounty hunter, meets her match in the handsome con artist she's tracking. Cast: Ron Marquette, Claire Stansfield, Sue Kiel, Nicholas Love, Dee McCafferty
11	11	"Weekend Pass"	Ted Kotcheff	Zalman King, Melanie Finn (story)	June 12, 1993
Chandler crosses paths with Eddie, a handsome drifter at the local bar on Christmas Eve. Cast: Anthony Addabbo, Ely Pouget, Shashawnee Hall, Renée Estevez
12	12	"Double or Nothing"	Dominique Othenin-Girard	Zalman King, Melanie Finn (teleplay)	June 19, 1993
Alicia finds love with a fellow pool shark. Cast: Paula Barbieri, Francesco Quinn, Carl Ciarfalio
13	13	"How I Met My Husband"	Bernard Auroux	Elizabeth Schwarz, Melanie Finn (teleplay)	June 26, 1993
Alice takes classes to become a dominatrix. Cast: Luigi Amodeo, Neith Hunter, Sue Kiel, Jennifer Burton, Alex Ardenti, Andrea Riave

=== Season 2 (1993) ===
No. overall	No. in season	Title	Directed by	Written by	Original release date
14	1	"Midnight Bells"	Anne Goursaud	Joëlle Bentolila	December 18, 1993
A woman reminisces about a man she spent three New Year's Eves with. Cast: Charlotte Lewis, Carsten Norgaard, Luc Leestemaker
15	2	"Naked in the Moonlight"	Philippe Angers	Melanie Greene, Melanie Finn, Zalman King	April 30, 1994
Camille inherits a fortune and a prized '57 Cadillac, which she takes to a mechanic. Cast: Raven Snow, John Enos III, Rudy de Rooy, California Ralph
16	3	"Runway"	Rafael Eisenman	Melanie Finn, Zalman King	May 21, 1994
Alia is an in-demand fashion model but has become disenchanted with the supermodel life. After striking up a conversation with cab driver Miguel, she decides to turn the tables and camera on him. Cast: Amber Smith, Udo Kier, Daniel Anibal Blasco, Jennifer Burton, James DeAngelo, Darienne Arnold, Lorna Firman, Deborah Lin, Andrea Riave, Frederick Washburn
17	4	"Kidnap"	Rafael Eisenman	Melanie Finn, Zalman King	June 11, 1994
On her way to closing the biggest deal of her career, Sara is kidnapped by a bank robber. Cast: Ron Marquette, Jennifer Ciesar, Matt LeBlanc, Robert Mailhouse, Dee McCafferty, Robert Peters
18	5	"Burning Up"	Rafael Eisenman	Patricia Louisianna Knop	July 14, 1994
A woman has a fling with a fireman. Cast: Alexandra Tydings, Mark Zuelke, Anthony Guidera, Rhonda Aldrich, Ivan Allen, Avalon Anders, Jennifer Burton
19	6	"Night of Abandon"	René Manzor	Henry Cobbold	TBA
A shy woman visits her grandmother in Rio de Janeiro and discovers lust with a Brazilian man during Carnival. Cast: Ann Cockburn, Daniel Leza, Catalina Bonakie
20	7	"Liar's Tale"	James Gavin Bedford	Melanie Finn	TBA
Corey, a burnt out photojournalist assigned to cover the L.A. sex scene, meets a high-class call girl who fascinates her. Cast: Erika Anderson, Audie England, Lorna Firman, Margaret Makinen, Peter Quartaroli, Terrence Sheahan, Paula Venice
21	8	"In the Blink of an Eye"	Rafael Eisenman	Melanie Finn, Zalman King	TBA
Kathryn, an upper-class woman in France, is tempted to cheat on her powerful husband with a boxer. Cast: Laurie Simpson, Julien Maurel, Richard Dieux, Brian Edwards, Philippe Nahon, Dominique Valera
22	9	"Hotline"	David Womark	Melanie Finn, Gilles de Baillenx	TBA
Tess takes a job at a phone sex hotline. Cast: Audie England, George Pilgrim, Don Bloomfield, María Celedonio, Margaret Cho, Wendy Schaal, Judy Toll
23	10	"Love at First Sight"	Zalman King	Zalman King	TBA
Harry and Cecelia, a couple on the run, pick up a hitchhiking bride. Cast: Alexandra Tydings, Anthony Addabbo, Eric James, Denice D. Lewis
24	11	"Gina"	Rafael Eisenman	Chloe King	TBA
Gina decides to shake up her life by moving to Paris. Cast: Lynette Walden, Michel Allaire, Stéphane Bonnet, Hervé Gamelin, Sabine Tingry, Didier Yakar
25	12	"Alphabet Girl"	Rafael Eisenman	Melanie Finn	TBA
A fashion model finds love. Cast: Christiana D'Amore, Justin Carroll, Brad Joseph Dubin
26	13	"Some Things Never Change"	Rafael Eisenman	Melanie Finn	TBA
The independent head of a fashion company and a temperamental commercial director rekindle their flame. Cast: Marina Giulia Cavalli, Brad Fisher, Sylvie Guelton, Guy Amram, Hero Kawashima

=== Season 3 (1994) ===
No. overall	No. in season	Title	Directed by	Written by	Original release date
27	1	"You Make Me Want to Wear Dresses"	Daniel Ducovny	Melanie Finn	TBA
Tomboy Brandy is persuaded by Calahan to ditch her cowgirl slacks for dresses. Cast: Sammi Davis, Maximo Morrone, Michelle Beauchamp, Jason Court
28	2	"The Game"	Philippe Angers	Chloe King	TBA
A bored married couple invent a board game to renew their intimacy. Cast: Caron Bernstein, Frederick Washburn, Eugene Choy, Tarik Ergin, Allan Graf, Kether Parker, Janine Stillo, Michael T. Weiss
29	3	"The Cake"	Brian Grant	Kathryn MacQuarrie	TBA
Juliet comes up with an idea for the cake for her husband's birthday. Cast: Jennifer MacDonald, Christian LeBlanc, Saxon Trainor, Peter Sands, John Bergantine, Tarik Ergin, Robert Peters, Barbara Pilavin, Janine Stillo, Sheelagh Cullen
30	4	"Like Father, Like Son"	Rafael Eisenman	Zalman King, Joshua Gray	TBA
A French woman recounts how her boyfriend Jamie became involved with opera singer Celeste, who also happens to be the lover of Jamie's father. Cast: Arielle Dombasle, Elodie Frenck, Will Stewart, Jean-Yves Gautier
31	5	"Borders of Salt"	Tibor Takács	Joëlle Bentolila	TBA
Claire and Paul have a brief romantic encounter on the train. Cast: Alan Boyce, Sofia Shinas, Peter Quartaroli
32	6	"Written Word"	Stephen Halbert	Kathy MacQuarrie	TBA
Law professor Clare discovers the identity of the secret admirer who sends her letters every week. Cast: Robbi Chong, Adewale Akinnuoye-Agbaje, Rhonda Aldrich, Peter Gregory
33	7	"Girl on a Bike"	Lydie Callier	Zalman King, Joshua Gray	TBA
Will goes on a wild goose chase through the streets of Paris to find a girl he saw bicycling and immediately became smitten with. Cast: Brent David Fraser, Géraldine Cotte
34	8	"Emily's Dance"	Zalman King	Richard Baskin	TBA
Emily is chosen to be the lead dancer in a music video, but becomes flustered when she has to dance with the video's star. Cast: Freedom Williams, Mari Morrow, Kent King, Lisa Boyle, Neisha Folkes-LeMelle, Wylie Draper
35	9	"Four on the Floor"	Rafael Eisenman	Joëlle Bentolila	TBA
A car crash in a rainstorm strands two couples at a deserted building. Cast: Christopher Atkins, Jsu Garcia, Dominique Abel, Rachel Palmieri
36	10	"The Psychiatrist"	David Womark	Nelly Alard	TBA
Psychiatrist Evelyn is compelled into her own journey of sexual self-discovery when one of her patients confides to her about her sexual encounters with men. Cast: Denise Crosby, Georges Corraface, Demetra Hampton, Natasha Cashman, Manoëlle Gaillard, Laurent Le Doyen, Paco Reconti, Richard Magaldi
37	11	"Luscious Lola"	Stephen Halbert	Chloe King	TBA
Mild-mannered Mimi creates a strong vivacious alter ego named "Luscious Lola". Cast: Bobbie Phillips, Michael Bendetti, Christina Fulton, Herbie Tribino
38	12	"Mercy"	Zalman King	Elise D'Haene, John Enos III	TBA
Rebecca is torn between two men, her husband and a younger man. Cast: John Enos III, Heidi Mark, Joseph Whipp, Vance Harvey
39	13	"The Last Motel"	Zalman King	Pascal Franchot, Elisa D'Haene	TBA
The paths of five guests, including a sailor, a couple, and five women, converge at a motel. Cast: Perrey Reeves, Michael Burke, Ernie Lee Banks, Andrew Bilgore, Darren Foy, Rina Garcia, Rita Branch, Laurel Wiley, Ed Wing

=== Season 4 (1995) ===
No. overall	No. in season	Title	Directed by	Written by	Original release date
1	40	"Billy Bar"	Rafael Eisenman	Chloe King	TBA
A former football star and prom queen realize their marriage is falling apart during Mardi Gras weekend. Cast: Anthony Addabbo, Troy Beyer, May Karasun, Jacqueline Lovell
2	41	"Divorce, Divorce"	Rafael Eisenman	Chloe King, Zalman King (story)	TBA
A couple in the midst of a divorce are stuck together for one fateful night. Cast: Audie England, Brad Fisher, Denice D. Lewis, Scott Plank, Brittany Ashton Holmes, Jennifer Rhodes
3	42	"Cowboy, Cowboy"	Rafael Eisenman	Zalman King	TBA
A recent divorcee returns to her hometown and falls head over heels for a charming cowboy. Cast: Mark Zuelke, Kathrin Nicholson, Pat Destro, Hollie Hummel
4	43	"Caged Bird"	Rafael Eisenman	Elise D'Haene	TBA
While in solitary confinement, Dakota meets Charlie, a prison guard. Cast: Shannon Atteberry, Hector Hank, Arroyn Lloyd, Jacqueline Lovell, Henric Nieminen
5	44	"The Ex"	Rafael Eisenman	Chloe King	TBA
Daisy and her new boyfriend Michael find themselves hostages of her ex. Cast: Kathrin Nicholson, Matt George, Brian Zuckerman
6	45	"The Teacher"	Rafael Eisenman	Zalman King	TBA
A married woman has a passionate affair with her tennis teacher, only to find out her husband hired him to enliven their humdrum marriage. Cast: Anthony Addabbo, Jacqueline Lovell, Mikhail Mamayev
7	46	"Swimming Naked"	Rafael Eisenman	Melanie Finn	TBA
A swimmer competing for the Olympics catches the eye of a small-town lifeguard. Cast: Kristi Frank, Omry Reznik, Kenneth David Ebling, Henric Nieminen, Robin Sagstetter, Carrie Sturdevant Fisher
8	47	"Jump"	Rafael Eisenman	Kathy McQuarrie, Chloe King	TBA
Tory goes skydiving on the eve of her engagement, which forces her to confront her fear and the reality she's been afraid to really live her life. Cast: Sonya Ryzy-Ryski, Michael Woods, Todd Gordon, Tom Sanders, Brad Hood, J.W. "Corkey" Fornof, Harry O'Connor, Dick "Skip" Evans
9	48	"Tears"	Zalman King	Zalman King	TBA
A talented young dancer becomes trapped in a love triangle involving a renowned choreographer. Cast: Daniel Ezralow, Cyia Batten, Troy Burgess, Priscilla Harris, Arabella Holzbog, Caitlin McLean, Regan Patno, Carolyn Seymour, Jeff Young
10	49	"Dime a Dance"	Rafael Eisenman	Chloe King	TBA
Winnie, Darcie, and Nan are dancers at a dime-a-dance joint. They each fall for their new bandleader, Michael. Cast: Ángel Ferreira, Hazel Miller, Dawn Whitaker, Bebe McGarry, Jennifer Burton, Al Israel
11	50	"Details"	Rafael Eisenman	Melanie Finn	TBA
Anne, a lonely and successful businesswoman, is drawn to a man who can't resist taking care of her neglected antique car. Cast: Alla Korot, Francesco Romano, Race Nelson
12	51	"Laundrymat"	Rafael Eisenman	Elisa D'Haene, Anthony Addabbo	TBA
A lonely single mother meets a handsome drifter late one night at a laundromat. Cast: Audie England, Brett Stimely
13	52	"As She Wishes"	Rafael Eisenman	Zalman King	TBA
A man is marooned alone on an exotic island until one day when a beautiful woman arrives onshore. Cast: Amber Smith, Adamo Palladino

=== Season 5 (1996) ===
No. overall	No. in season	Title	Directed by	Written by	Original release date
1	53	"Weightless"	Rafael Eisenman	John Shirley	TBA
An astronaut trapped in a dying spacecraft far from home has one last encounter with her co-pilot. Cast: Darya Poverennova, Mikhail Mamaev, Yuiri Malinovsky
2	54	"Carried Away"	Rafael Eisenman	Chloe King, Zalman King	TBA
A woman retreats to a country farm to rethink her crumbling relationship with her boyfriend. A storm knocks out all communication except for carrier pigeon, leading the woman to communicate with her partner in a whole new way. Cast: Elena Leandrus, Mikhail Mamaev, Yuiri Malinovsky, Marina Cherneleac, Oxana Urib
3	55	"Jealousy"	Rafael Eisenman	Zalman King, Patricia Louisianna Knop	TBA
An actor suspects his actress wife is having an affair with her hunky co-star. Cast: Patrick Budal, Yelena Zatolokina, Rubi Zack, Viktoriya Khadzhinova, Oleg Sukatchenko, Natalya Reva, Ekaterina Listrova, Aleksandr Seleznyov
4	56	"The Boxer"	Rafael Eisenman	Zalman King, Elise D'Haene	TBA
Kate, a photographer who has given up on love, falls for Max, a struggling boxer she allows to stay at her loft while they work together on a perfume ad. Cast: Melissa Behr, Patrick Budal, Heather Sutherland, Sherrie Rose, Erika Gabaldon
5	57	"Strip Poker"	Rafael Eisenman	Zalman King, Patricia Louisianna Knop	TBA
A photographer joins in a game of strip poker. Cast: Anfisa Nejinskaya, Larisa Tipikina, Yuliya Blokhina, Andrei Overchiuk, Vladimir Pliska, Marina Malchevskaya
6	58	"Hard Labor"	Zalman King	Zalman King, Elise D'Haene	TBA
Aleta, an advertising executive working on the campaign for Hard Labor Jeans, faces the prospect of forgiveness and redemption when she is confronted by her lover's ex. Cast: Jennifer Ciesar, Maximo Morrone, Jennifer Nash, Omar Alberto, Jim McMullan, Elan Atias, David McKay, Torry Pendergrass, Audie England
7	59	"Slow Train"	Zalman King	Julie Marie Myatt	TBA
Sally discovers her grandmother wasn't the passionless woman she'd thought her to be when she finds the diary she kept as a desperate young woman during the 1930s. Cast: Andrew Calder, Maureen Carter, Richard Hench, Floyd Irons, Athena Massey, Sam Menning, Henric Nieminen, Mark Zuelke
8	60	"Temple of Flesh"	Rafael Eisenman	Zalman King	TBA
A couple's one-year anniversary celebration is crashed by a couple of hippies. Cast: Justin Carroll, Darren Foy, Anya Longwell, Elina Madison, Clement von Franckenstein, Martin Charles Warner
9	61	"Juarez"	Lizzie Borden	Caroline Yeh, Lizzie Borden	TBA
A young woman coming to terms with her mother's impending death becomes fascinated with a mysterious masked Mexican wrestler. Cast: Neith Hunter, Daniel Leza, Brad Fisher, Lupe Ontiveros, Sophia Santi, Sue Casey, Ludo Vika, Rick Garcia, Francisco P. Cardoza, Gokor Chivichyan, Jose P. Cordoza, Richard Doran, Salvador Guerrero IV, Mando Guerroro, Alvin Lion, Jeff Cadiente, Thomas Rosales Jr.
10	62	"Farmer's Daughter"	Rafael Eisenman	Zalman King	TBA
The spirited daughter of a vineyard owner nurses an injured cyclist back to health. Cast: Patrick Budal, Irina Grigoryeva, Aleksandr Shitikov, Rubi Zack
11	63	"The Forbidden Zone"	Rafael Eisenman	Chloe King, Zalman King (story)	April 23, 1996
A woman in an affair tells a story set in the far future in a completely puritan world, where the freedoms taken for granted are all but forbidden. Cast: Beverly Johnson, Anthony Addabbo, Honey Labrador, Jay Acovone, Albert Alexander, Bryan Anthony, Robin Antin, Lisa Arturo, Carmit Bachar, Michelle Beauchamp, Palmer Davis, Sharon Ferguson, Eric Fishman, Norman Howell, Nito Larioza, Kevin Alexander Stea, Taimak
12	64	"Art of Loneliness"	Rafael Eisenman	Zalman King	August 17, 1996
Elizabeth, a blind late night radio personality, becomes involved in a love triangle with two other emotionally empty people. Cast: Raven Snow, Brad Fisher, Caron Bernstein, Honey Labrador
13	65	"The Picnic"	Rafael Eisenman	Zalman King	May 17, 1997
Rita is torn between two lovers who are best friends. Cast: Anthony Addabbo, Kira Reed, Eric James
14	66	"Banished"	Rafael Eisenman	Tony Selznick	TBA
An angel is condemned to earth where he is cursed with the power to kill with a kiss. Cast: Vladimir Kehkaial, Cyia Batten, Carmit Bachar, Melissa Williams

== Release ==
=== Syndication ===
Originally screened in the UK on Channel 5 in the 1990s, the channel screened several episodes back-to-back on August 30, 2021. Red Shoe Diaries episodes were also broadcast on the Canadian television channel Showcase in August 2010.

== Reception ==
Though the series gained unfavorable attention from critics, it was a major success for Showtime and helped boost the network's viewership to compete with HBO in the 1990s. It was the first softcore program to be touted by a premium cable network and to deliver consistently high ratings. Imitators and softcore series similarly aimed at female audiences sprang up in the wake of the show's popularity, including The Hunger, Emmanuelle in Space, Women: Stories of Passion, and Strangers. TV critics described the series as "both creator of 'art house' soft porn and savior of the kind of quality programming for which pay cable has also become known", and "innovative for its time...[for staying] true to its basic, lusty principles while adding music-video artiness, jumpy, nervy video cuts and dim mood lighting for a veneer of upscale, almost snooty, erotica. Lifetime with nudity."

Despite the series's foregrounding of a woman's perspective and inclusion of some lesbian story lines, it did receive criticism for its heavy featuring of female nudity, particularly since no male full frontal nudity was shown.

== Home media ==
After the 1992 release of the pilot movie, episodes from the series were compiled on VHS, Laserdisc, and DVD as branded Red Shoe Diaries movies. Each compilation features three episodes.

1. Red Shoe Diaries (1992)
2. Red Shoe Diaries 2: Double Dare. "Safe Sex" / "You Have the Right to Remain Silent" / "Double Dare"
3. Red Shoe Diaries 3: Another Woman's Lipstick. "Just Like That" / "Another Woman's Lipstick" / "Talk to Me Baby"
4. Red Shoe Diaries 4: Auto Erotica. "Accidents Happen" / "Auto Erotica" / "Jake's Story"
5. Red Shoe Diaries 5: Weekend Pass. "Double or Nothing" / "Bounty Hunter" / "Weekend Pass"
6. Red Shoe Diaries 6: How I Met My Husband. "How I Met My Husband" / "Naked in the Moonlight" / "Midnight Bells"
7. Red Shoe Diaries 7: Burning Up. "Runway" / "Kidnap" / "Burning Up"
8. Red Shoe Diaries 8: Night of Abandon. "Night of Abandon" / "Liar's Tale" / "In the Blink of an Eye"
9. Red Shoe Diaries 9: Hotline. "Gina" / "Hotline" / "Love at First Sight"
10. Red Shoe Diaries 10: Some Things Never Change. "You Make Me Want to Wear Dresses" / "Some Things Never Change" / "Alphabet Girl"
11. Red Shoe Diaries 11: The Game. "The Game" / "The Cake" / "Like Father, Like Son"
12. Red Shoe Diaries 12: Girl on a Bike. "Girl on a Bike" / "Written Word" / "Borders of Salt"
13. Red Shoe Diaries 13: Four on the Floor. "The Psychiatrist" / "Four on the Floor" / "Emily's Dance"
14. Red Shoe Diaries 14: Luscious Lola. "Luscious Lola" / "The Last Motel" / "Mercy"
15. Red Shoe Diaries 15: Forbidden Zone. "Forbidden Zone" / "The Art of Loneliness" / "The Picnic"
16. Red Shoe Diaries 16: Temple of Flesh. "Temple of Flesh" / "Juarez" / "The Farmer's Daughter"
17. Red Shoe Diaries 17: Swimming Naked. "Swimming Naked" / "Jump" / "Tears"
18. Red Shoe Diaries 18: Strip Poker. "Strip Poker" / "Slow Train" / "Hard Labor"
19. Red Shoe Diaries 19: As She Wishes. "As She Wishes" / "Billy Bar" / "Weightless"
20. Red Shoe Diaries 20: Caged Bird. "Caged Bird" / "The Ex" / "The Teacher"

On June 17, 2014, Kino Lorber released Season 1 on DVD in Region 1. On the same day they also re-released Red Shoe Diaries - The Movie. Season 1 was also made available on Amazon Prime Video. The TV film and series (seasons 1-4) are also available on Tubi, a free streaming service, but not on Paramount+.

== Second Red Shoe Diaries TV pilot ==
In 2006, Zalman King wrote and directed a second, feature-length Red Shoe Diaries TV pilot. This pilot was completed but never aired.
