= Love on the Run (1994 film) =

- Genre: Drama; Horror; Mystery
- Written by: Jim Cruickshank; James Orr
- Directed by: Ted Kotcheff; Julie Lee
- Starring: Anthony Addabbo; Len Cariou; Blu Mankuma
- Music by: Ken Harrison
- Country of origin: United States
- Original language: English

Production
- Executive producers: Gary A. Randall; Aaron Spelling
- Producer: N. John Smith
- Production location: British Columbia
- Cinematography: Ron Orieux
- Editor: Geoffrey Rowland
- Running time: 120 minutes
- Production companies: CanWest Global Communications; Global; Primedia Productions; Spelling Entertainment

Original release
- Network: NBC
- Release: June 5, 1994

Love on the Run is a 1994 American TV film directed by Ted Kotcheff and Julie Lee.

== Plot ==
A mercenary marries an heiress and set up an adventure-travel business.

== Cast ==
- Anthony Addabbo as Frank Powers
- Noelle Beck as Ava Cross
- Len Cariou as Noah Cross
- Blu Mankuma as Ray Valentine
- Nada Despotovich as Margot
- Byron Lucas as Steve
- Anna Hagan as Ashton
- French Tickner as Airport Guard
- Charles Andre as Leo
- Fred Perron as Doug
- David Lewis as Ranger
- Ken Tremblett as Mountie
