= List of erotic thriller films =

The erotic thriller is a film subgenre defined as a film that "combines romanticized, 'erotic' appeal with a dangerous 'thriller' narrative—a "pleasure/danger" principle". The elements of bodily danger and pleasure are central to the plot. Most erotic thrillers contain scenes of softcore sex, though the frequency and explicitness of those scenes varies. British academic Linda Ruth Williams described erotic thriller films as "noirish stories of sexual intrigue incorporating some form of criminality or duplicity, often as the flimsy framework for onscreen softcore sex".

The word "erotic" began to adhere to "thriller" during the 1980s to describe a sudden boom in noir-like thriller films with sexually provocative content. The late 1980s to the mid-1990s are regarded as the "classic period" of the erotic thriller, and the most recognizable films of the genre, such as Basic Instinct, Fatal Attraction, and The Last Seduction were released in this era.

== Precursors to the erotic thriller ==
In his book Hollywood's Dark Cinema: The American Film Noir, Robert Barton Palmer claimed "perhaps the most popular genre in the 1990s, the so-called erotic thriller [...] is a direct descendant of the classic film noir". Many films of the 1960s and 70s also provocatively mixed noir themes with softcore sex, erotic fantasy, and voyeurism. The erotic thriller also contains influences from the genres of mystery and horror, as well as from pornography.

== Notable figures ==
Certain filmmakers and actors are associated with the genre. Brian De Palma helped usher in the classic period of the genre with films Dressed to Kill and Body Double, and directed Femme Fatale and Passion later in his career. Dutch filmmaker Paul Verhoeven directed Basic Instinct, Showgirls, and Benedetta. Joe Eszterhas became a sought-after screenwriter in the classic period, writing the screenplays for Jagged Edge, Basic Instinct, Showgirls, and Jade. Adrian Lyne has directed several films of the genre, including 9½ Weeks, Fatal Attraction, Indecent Proposal, Unfaithful, and Deep Water. Other filmmakers include Atom Egoyan, Paul Schrader, Abel Ferrara, William Friedkin, David Cronenberg, and Zalman King.

The most recognizable actor associated with erotic thrillers is Michael Douglas, who starred in four films—Fatal Attraction, Basic Instinct, Disclosure, and A Perfect Murder. Mickey Rourke, Richard Gere, James Spader, and Tom Berenger have also starred in multiple films of the genre. Notable actresses include Sharon Stone, Linda Fiorentino, Glenn Close, Kathleen Turner, Demi Moore, and Greta Scacchi.

== List of films: 1930–1940 ==
=== 1931 ===
- Safe in Hell

== List of films: 1940–1970 ==
=== 1944 ===
- Double Indemnity^{[a]}

=== 1958 ===
- Vertigo^{[a]}

=== 1962 ===
- Lolita^{[a]}

=== 1966 ===
- Trans-Europ-Express

=== 1969 ===
- Blind Beast
- Venus in Furs (a.k.a. Black Angel and Paroxismus)

== List of films: 1970–1980 ==
=== 1971 ===
- She Killed in Ecstasy

=== 1972 ===
- Last Tango in Paris^{[a]}
- Punarjanmam
- The Stepmother

=== 1973 ===
- Maru Piravi

=== 1974 ===
- The Teacher
- Wife to Be Sacrificed

=== 1975 ===
- Waves of Lust

=== 1976 ===
- The Hook (a.k.a. To Agistri)
- Obsession^{[a]}
- Vortex (a.k.a. Blondie, Blondy, and Germacide)

=== 1977 ===
- Looking for Mr. Goodbar

=== 1978 ===
- Attacked!! (a.k.a. Attack!!)
- The Eyes of Laura Mars^{[a]}
- Nicole (a.k.a. Crazed and The Widow's Revenge)

== List of films: 1980–1989 ==
=== 1980 ===
- American Gigolo^{[a]}
- Bad Timing^{[a]}
- Cruising^{[a]}
- Diversion
- Dressed to Kill^{[a]}
- Macabre, erotic-horror
- Night Games
- Nightkill

=== 1981 ===
- Body Heat^{[a]}
- The Fan, erotic-horror
- Lovely But Deadly, erotic-action
- Ms. 45,^{[a]} erotic exploitation
- The Postman Always Rings Twice,^{[a]} erotic-drama
- Tattoo

=== 1982 ===
- Cat People (erotic-horror)
- The Seduction

=== 1983 ===
- American Nightmare
- Female Cats
- The Fourth Man^{[a]}
- The Hunger (erotic-horror)

=== 1984 ===
- Against All Odds
- Bedroom Eyes
- Blind Date
- Body Double^{[a]}
- Crimes of Passion^{[a]}
- Fear City
- Innocent Prey
- Perfect Strangers
- Secrets of a Married Man
- Shadows Run Black
- Sole Survivor
- The Surrogate
- Thief of Hearts
- Tightrope
- Les Trottoirs de Bangkok (a.k.a. The Sidewalks of Bangkok)

=== 1985 ===
- Jagged Edge^{[a]}
- The Trap (a.k.a. The Cage, Collector's Item, and Dead Fright)

=== 1986 ===
- 52 Pick-Up
- 9½ Weeks^{[a]}
- Blue Velvet
- Devil in the Flesh
- Evil Senses
- Half Moon Street
- Matador
- The Wind

=== 1987 ===
- Angel Heart
- The Bedroom Window, neo-noir
- Black Widow
- Coda
- Fatal Attraction
- Five Corners
- Lady Beware
- No Way Out
- Open House^{[a]}
- Siesta
- Slam Dance
- Someone to Watch Over Me
- Stripped to Kill
- Summer Heat

=== 1988 ===
- Backfire
- Call Me
- Dangerous Love
- Dead Ringers^{[a]}
- Dial Help
- The Drifter
- The Girl in a Swing
- Grievous Bodily Harm
- Into the Fire (a.k.a. The Legend of Wolf Lodge)
- Last Rites
- Masquerade
- Midnight Cop
- Obsession: A Taste for Fear
- Party Line
- Spellbinder

=== 1989 ===
- Bedroom Eyes II
- Cat Chaser
- Cold Comfort
- Fatal Exposure^{[a]}
- Fever
- Glass
- Hider in the House, psychological erotic-thriller
- High Stakes
- In Too Deep
- Kill Me Again,^{[a]} neo-noir
- Loos
- Night Visitor
- Out of the Dark
- Paint It Black
- Prime Suspect
- Sea of Love,^{[a]} neo-noir
- Stripped to Kill II: Live Girls
- Trapped
- Twisted Obsession
- Wild Orchid

== List of films: 1990–1996 ==
=== 1990 ===
- After Dark, My Sweet
- Body Chemistry^{[a]}
- Deceptions^{[a]}
- Disturbed
- Fatal Charm
- Hard to Die
- The Hot Spot^{[a]}
- I'm Dangerous Tonight
- Impulse^{[a]}
- Jezebel's Kiss
- Meridian: Kiss of the Beast
- Mortal Passions
- Naked Obsession^{[a]}
- Night Eyes^{[a]}
- Presumed Innocent

=== 1991 ===
- The Adjuster
- Bikini Island
- Carnal Crimes^{[a]}
- Close My Eyes
- Deadly Desire
- Deadly Surveillance^{[a]}
- Defenseless
- Fatal Bond
- Hunting
- The Indecent Woman
- Intimate Stranger^{[a]}
- Inner Sanctum, erotic-drama
- A Kiss Before Dying
- Kiss Me a Killer^{[a]}
- Last Call^{[a]}
- Legal Tender^{[a]}
- Liebestraum
- Liquid Dreams^{[a]}
- Lower Level
- Shattered, psychological erotic-thriller
- Sleeping with the Enemy
- Victim of Love (a.k.a. Raw Heat)
- Whore
- Wild Orchid II: Two Shades of Blue
- Zandalee

=== 1992 ===
- Animal Instincts^{[a]}
- Basic Instinct,^{[a]} neo-noir
- Bitter Moon^{[a]}
- Body Chemistry II: Voice of a Stranger^{[a]}
- Consenting Adults
- Dama koja ubija (a.k.a. Lady Killer)
- Damage, erotic-drama
- Dance with Death^{[a]}
- Desire and Hell at Sunset Motel
- Double Jeopardy^{[a]}
- The Fear Inside
- Final Analysis^{[a]}
- Final Embrace
- The Hand That Rocks the Cradle
- The Heart of Justice
- Illicit Behavior^{[a]}
- In the Heat of Passion
- Killer Instinct (a.k.a. Homicidal Impulse)
- Light Sleeper
- Love Crimes^{[a]}
- Mirror Images^{[a]}
- Murderous Affair^{[a]}
- Night Eyes 2^{[a]}
- Obsessed^{[a]}
- Poison Ivy
- Quake (a.k.a. Aftershock and The Stalker)
- Ruby Cairo
- Secret Games^{[a]}
- Sexual Response
- Single White Female
- Sketch Artist (a.k.a. The Sketch Artist)
- The Smile of the Fox
- Storyville
- Through the Eyes of a Killer
- Twin Sisters^{[a]}
- Unlawful Entry^{[a]}
- Whispers in the Dark

=== 1993 ===
- Acting on Impulse
- Betrayal of the Dove
- Bitter Harvest
- Blown Away
- Body of Evidence^{[a]}
- Body of Influence
- Boxing Helena
- Cold Sweat
- Craving Desire
- The Crush
- Die Watching^{[a]}
- Dream Lover
- Fatal Instinct^{[a]}
- Fatal Past^{[a]}
- Gross Misconduct
- Guilty as Sin,
- Hexed
- Hidden Obsession^{[a]}
- A House in the Hills
- I Can Make You Love Me (a.k.a. Stalking Laura)^{[a]}
- Indecent Behavior^{[a]}
- Indecent Proposal, erotic-drama
- L.A. Goddess^{[a]}
- Lake Consequence
- Malice, neo-noir
- Mirror Images 2^{[a]}
- Mother's Boys
- Night Eyes 3^{[a]}
- Romeo Is Bleeding, erotic neo-noir
- Secret Games 2: The Escort^{[a]}
- Sexual Intent^{[a]}
- Silver
- Sins of Desire^{[a]}
- Sins of the Night^{[a]}
- Sliver^{[a]}
- Snapdragon
- The Substitute
- Sunset Grill
- Tomcat: Dangerous Desires
- Tropical Heat^{[a]}
- Wild Cactus^{[a]}
- The Wrong Man

=== 1994 ===
- 1-900 (a.k.a. 06)
- Animal Instincts 2^{[a]}
- Blindfold: Acts of Obsession^{[a]}
- Body Shot ^{[a]}
- Breaking Point
- Caroline at Midnight
- China Moon^{[a]} neo-noir
- Color of Night^{[a]}
- The Cool Surface
- Criminal Passion^{[a]}
- Dangerous Touch^{[a]}
- Disclosure^{[a]}
- Double Cross
- Exotica^{[a]}
- Fleshtone
- French Silk
- Hard Drive^{[a]}
- Illicit Dreams^{[a]}
- Improper Conduct^{[a]}
- Indecent Behavior II^{[a]}
- Inner Sanctum II, erotic-drama
- Killer Looks^{[a]}
- Lady in Waiting
- The Last Seduction, neo-noir
- Lipstick Camera^{[a]}
- Love Is a Gun
- Midnight Tease^{[a]}
- Mind Twister^{[a]}
- Night Fire
- Object of Obsession^{[a]}
- Playmaker (a.k.a. Death Date and Private Teacher)
- Point of Seduction: Body Chemistry III^{[a]}
- Possessed by the Night
- Save Me
- Scorned (a.k.a. A Woman Scorned)^{[a]}
- Secret Games 3^{[a]}
- Sensation
- Sexual Malice (a.k.a. The Other Man)^{[a]}
- Sirens
- Tryst
- Woman of Desire^{[a]}
- XX: Beautiful Hunter, Japanese erotic-thriller

=== 1995 ===
- Above Suspicion
- The Babysitter
- Beyond Desire
- Bodily Harm^{[a]}
- Body Chemistry IV: Full Exposure^{[a]}
- Body Language^{[a]}
- Cover Me^{[a]}
- Dangerous Indiscretion^{[a]}
- Gentlemen Don't Eat Poets
- Illegal in Blue
- Indecent Behavior III^{[a]}
- Jade^{[a]}
- Lap Dancing^{[b]}
- The Maddening
- Malicious^{[a]}
- Midnight Tease II^{[a]}
- Mirror, Mirror III: The Voyeur (erotic-horror)
- Never Talk to Strangers
- Payback
- Private Obsession
- Seduced and Betrayed
- Showgirls
- Sorceress (a.k.a. Temptress II)
- Species (erotic-horror)
- To Die For, black comedy erotic-thriller
- To the Limit
- Victim of Desire (a.k.a. Implicated)^{[a]}
- Virtual Desire^{[a]}
- Virtual Seduction
- Wild Side
- Where Evil Lies
- XX: Beautiful Beast

=== 1996 ===
- Animal Instincts: The Seductress (a.k.a. Animal Instincts 3)^{[a]}
- The Bondage Master (a.k.a. Rope Detective)
- Body of Influence 2^{[a]}
- Bound,^{[a]} neo-noir crime thriller
- Caught
- Crash,^{[a]} psychological erotic-thriller
- Dead Heart
- Diabolique,^{[a]} psychological erotic-thriller
- Electra
- Exit in Red^{[a]}
- Fear,^{[a]} psychological erotic-thriller
- Heaven's Prisoners
- Hungry for You
- Invasion of Privacy
- Irresistible Impulse^{[a]}
- The Juror
- Kissed^{[a]}
- Mari's Prey (a.k.a. Mari's Game)
- Masseuse^{[a]}
- Naked Souls^{[a]}
- Night Eyes 4: Fatal Passion^{[a]}
- Night Shade^{[a]}
- Poison Ivy II: Lily^{[a]}
- Scene of the Crime (a.k.a. Ladykiller)
- Sexual Roulette^{[a]}
- Showgirl Murders^{[a]}
- XX: Beautiful Prey, Japanese erotic-thriller
- Zero Woman: Assassin Lovers, Japanese erotic-thriller

== List of films: 1997–2007 ==
=== 1997 ===
- Business for Pleasure^{[a]}
- Confessions of a Lap Dancer(a.k.a. Illicit Confessions)^{[a]}
- Dark Secrets^{[a]}
- Echo (a.k.a. Deadly Echo)
- The Escort
- Evil Obsession (a.k.a. Illegal Entry)^{[a]}
- The Ex
- Exception to the Rule^{[a]}
- A Gun for Jennifer
- Hot Suspect (a.k.a. Human Desires and Indecent Behavior 4)^{[a]}
- Illicit Dreams 2 (a.k.a. Death and Desire)^{[a]}
- Laws of Deception
- Lethal Seduction^{[a]}
- Live Flesh
- Love in Paris (a.k.a. Another 9½ Weeks)^{[a]}
- Matter of Trust
- Mutual Needs
- Poison Ivy: The New Seduction^{[a]}
- Scorned 2^{[a]}
- Shades of Gray (a.k.a. Twisted Passion)^{[a]}
- Sorceress II: The Temptress
- This World, Then the Fireworks^{[a]}
- Zero Woman: The Accused, Japanese erotic-thriller
- Zero Woman: The Hunted, Japanese erotic-thriller

=== 1998 ===
- A Perfect Murder
- Devil in the Flesh
- The Escort II
- Fatal Pursuit^{[a]}
- Losing Control^{[a]}
- New Rose Hotel
- Tainted Love^{[a]}
- Testing the Limits^{[a]}
- The Tribe
- Wild Things
- Zero Woman: Dangerous Game, Japanese erotic-thriller

=== 1999 ===
- The Escort III
- Eyes Wide Shut^{[a]}
- Forbidden Sins
- The Last Seduction II,^{[a]} neo-noir
- Loser Love
- Powerplay^{[a]}
- Raw Nerve
- The Talented Mr. Ripley
- Two Shades of Blue^{[b]}
- Yellow Hair (a.k.a. The Blonde), Korean erotic-thriller

=== 2000 ===
- Cherry Falls
- Devil in the Flesh 2 (a.k.a. Teacher's Pet)
- Freeze Me (a.k.a. Freezer)
- Mercy
- Reindeer Games (a.k.a. Deception)
- Starstruck
- Tales of The Kama Sutra: The Perfumed Garden,^{[a]} erotic-thriller drama
- The Right Temptation
- Trois^{[a]}
- Warm Texas Rain ^{[a]}

=== 2001 ===
- Birthday Girl
- Cold Heart
- Dangerous Sex Date
- Lantana
- Mulholland Drive,^{[a]} neo-noir mystery
- Night Class (a.k.a. Seduced by a Thief)^{[a]}
- Original Sin^{[a]}
- The Piano Teacher
- Pretty When You Cry (a.k.a. Seduced)
- Tales of The Kama Sutra 2: Monsoon^{[a]}
- Thy Neighbor's Wife (a.k.a. Poison)
- Zebra Lounge

=== 2002 ===
- Angel Blade
- Demonlover, neo-noir
- Femme Fatale,^{[a]} mystery/thriller neo-noir
- Killing Me Softly^{[a]}
- Swimfan
- Trois 2: Pandora's Box^{[a]}
- Unfaithful
- Wolfhound

=== 2003 ===
- Art of Revenge
- Dot the i, psychological erotic-thriller
- Final Examination
- In the Cut^{[a]}
- Jism
- Love Object
- Swimming Pool

=== 2004 ===
- Decoys (erotic horror)
- Eyes of Crystal
- Hawas
- Motives
- Murder
- The Scarlet Letter
- Trois: The Escort (a.k.a. Trois 3: The Escort)
- Tum – A Dangerous Obsession
- Wicker Park
- Wild Things 2

=== 2005 ===
- Flirting with Anthony
- Kalyug
- Lust Connection
- Rain
- Les Saignantes (a.k.a. Those Who Bleed)
- Where the Truth Lies
- Zeher
- Wild Things: Diamonds in the Rough (a.k.a. Wild Things 3)

=== 2006 ===
- Aksar
- Basic Instinct 2, neo-noir
- Ganda Hendathi
- Red Road

=== 2007 ===
- Boarding Gate
- I Know Who Killed Me, psychological erotic-thriller
- Socket

== List of films: 2008–2019 ==
=== 2008 ===
- Death in Love
- Deception
- The Kreutzer Sonata
- Loft
- Poison Ivy: The Secret Society
- Sex and Lies in Sin City

=== 2009 ===
- Bluebeard
- Blue Seduction
- Chloe
- Compulsion
- Crush
- Indira Vizha
- Ek Tho Chance
- No Right Turn
- Pornography: A Thriller
- Searching for the Elephant
- The Pit and the Pendulum
- Obsessed

=== 2010 ===
- The Housemaid
- Secret Love
- Vlees
- A Serbian Film (erotic-horror)

=== 2011 ===
- Murder 2
- Ragini MMS
- Silver Tongues
- X: Night of Vengeance
- The Skin I Live In

=== 2012 ===
- Dangerous Liaisons
- Hate Story
- In the House
- Jism 2
- Passion
- The Taste of Money
- Under My Nails

=== 2013 ===
- 24 Exposures
- The Canyons
- Murder 3
- Pleasure or Pain
- Plush
- In Secret
- Stranger by the Lake

=== 2014 ===
- Addicted
- After Midnight
- Hate Story 2
- Ice Cream
- Ice Cream 2
- Innocent Thing
- Lang Tong
- The Loft
- Obsessed
- Ragini MMS 2
- Scarlet Innocence
- Zid
- The Blue Room

=== 2015 ===
- Bound
- The Boy Next Door
- Careful What You Wish For
- Charlie Kay Chakkar Mein (a.k.a. Entangle with Charlie)
- Goddess of Love, psychological erotic-thriller
- Hate Story 3
- Knock Knock
- Locust

=== 2016 ===
- Elle
- Frank & Lola
- The Handmaiden
- Indiscretion
- Iris
- Ishq Junoon
- Love Games
- One Night Stand
- Road Games
- Siren (erotic-horror)
- When the Bough Breaks

=== 2017 ===
- Aksar 2
- L'Amant double (a.k.a. Double Lover)
- Unforgettable

=== 2018 ===
- Acrimony
- Hate Story 4
- In Darkness
- Knife+Heart

=== 2019 ===
- Sequin in a Blue Room
- Queen of Hearts (erotic drama)

== List of films: 2020–present ==
=== 2020 ===
- 365 Days
- Fatale
- Lost Girls & Love Hotels
- What Lies Below

=== 2021 ===
- Benedetta
- The Beta Test
- Deadly Illusions
- The Voyeurs

=== 2022 ===
- Deep Water
- 365 Days: This Day
- The Next 365 Days
- X

=== 2023 ===
- Femme
- Fair Play
- Saltburn
- Rotting in the Sun
- Suitable Flesh

=== 2024 ===
- Miller's Girl
- Love Lies Bleeding
- Babygirl

=== 2025 ===
- The Housemaid
- Fall for Me
- Night Stage
- Pretty Thing

=== 2026 ===
- I Want Your Sex
- Night Nurse
- Soulm8te
- Verity

== Miscellaneous crossover films ==
- Macabre, 1980, erotic-horror
- The Fan, 1981, erotic-horror
- Lovely But Deadly, 1981, erotic-action
- Ms .45,^{[a]} 1981, erotic exploitation
- The Postman Always Rings Twice,^{[a]} 1981, erotic-drama
- Naked Killer, 1992, Hong Kong erotic-action
- Shadows Run Black, 1984, erotic-crime thriller
- Sole Survivor, 1984, erotic-horror
- Sea of Love,^{[a]} 1989, neo-noir
- Kill Me Again,^{[a]} 1989, erotic neo-noir
- Inner Sanctum, 1991, erotic-drama
- Basic Instinct,^{[a]} 1992, neo-noir
- Romeo Is Bleeding, 1993, erotic neo-noir
- Inner Sanctum II, 1994, erotic-drama
- China Moon,^{[a]} 1994, erotic neo-noir
- The Last Seduction,^{[a]} 1994, erotic neo-noir
- Bound,^{[a]} 1996, erotic neo-noir crime thriller
- The Last Seduction II,^{[a]} 1999, erotic neo-noir

== Post-period crossover films ==
- Femme Fatale,^{[a]} 2002 mystery/thriller neo-noir
- Unfaithful 2002, erotic-drama
- Basic Instinct 2, 2006, neo-noir
- Lust, Caution, 2007, erotic-drama
- Chloe 2009 lesbian romantic drama
- Compulsion, 2013, psychological dark comedy erotic thriller
- Frank & Lola, 2016, erotic neo-noir
- The Handmaiden 2016 lesbian romantic drama
