= Night Rhythms =

1992 film by Gregory Dark

- Directed by: Gregory Dark (as Gregory Hippolyte)
- Written by: Alan Gries; Robyn Sullivent; Andrew W. Garroni (uncredited)
- Produced by: Andrew W. Garroni; Walter Gernert (executive producer); Michael Simmons (line producer)
- Starring: Martin Hewitt; David Carradine; Sam J. Jones; Deborah Driggs; Delia Sheppard; Tracy Tweed; Jamie Summers
- Cinematography: Wally Pfister
- Edited by: James Avalon (as Kent Smith)
- Music by: Ashley Irwin
- Release dates: September 9, 1992 (United States); October 20, 1992 (United Kingdom)
- Running time: 99 minutes
- Country: United States
- Language: English

Night Rhythms is a 1992 American erotic thriller film directed by Gregory Dark. The film stars Martin Hewitt, David Carradine, Deborah Driggs, Delia Sheppard, and Jamie Summers.

== Plot ==
Nick West hosts a late night radio show where he gets multiple female callers to talk about their sex lives with him. One night, he has sex with a listener that invites herself to the station, but when he wakes up, he finds that the woman has been strangled to death, the killing having been broadcast on air. He must go on the run to prove his innocence, as he is accosted by mob boss Vincent and police officer Jackson, while helped only by his bartender friend Cinnamon and his show's producer Bridget.

== Cast ==
- Martin Hewitt as Nick West
- David Carradine as Vincent
- Sam J. Jones as Jackson
- Deborah Driggs as "Cinnamon"
- Delia Sheppard as Bridget
- Tracy Tweed as "Honey"
- Jamie Summers as Kit (credited as Jamie Stafford)
- Patrice Leal as Lila
- Julie Strain as Linda
- Vinnie Curto as Joseph (credited as Vincent Curto)
- Timothy C. Burns as Edgar
- Juliet James as Sandra Mitchell
- Stephen Fiachi as Cop
- Theresa Ring as Roxanne
- Kristine Rose as Marilyn
- Carrie Bittner as Elaine
- Erika Nann as Alex
