= Body of Influence =

1993 American erotic thriller drama film

- Directed by: Gregory Dark
- Produced by: Andrew W. Garroni
- Starring: Nick Cassavetes; Shannon Whirry; Richard Roundtree; Sandahl Bergman; Anna Karin; Don Swayze; Catherine Parks; Diana Barton
- Cinematography: João Fernandes; Glenn Kershaw
- Edited by: James Avalon
- Music by: Ashley Irwin
- Distributed by: Axis Films International (international); Multicom Entertainment Group (select territories, otherwise plastered by VMI Worldwide on newer releases)
- Release date: 1993
- Running time: 96 minutes
- Country: United States
- Language: English

Body of Influence is a 1993 American erotic thriller film directed by Gregory Dark and produced by Andrew W. Garroni. The film has music composed by Ashley Irwin. The film stars Nick Cassavetes, Shannon Whirry, Richard Roundtree, Sandahl Bergman, and Anna Karin. A sequel, Body of Influence 2, was released in 1996.

== Cast ==
- Nick Cassavetes as Jonathan Brooks
- Shannon Whirry as Laura / Lana
- Richard Roundtree as Harry Reams
- Sandahl Bergman as Clarissa
- Anna Karin as Beth
- Don Swayze as Biker
- Catherine Parks as Helen
- Diana Barton as Jennifer
- Kelly Andrus as the Reporter
