= Wally Pfister =

American cinematographer and director (born 1961)

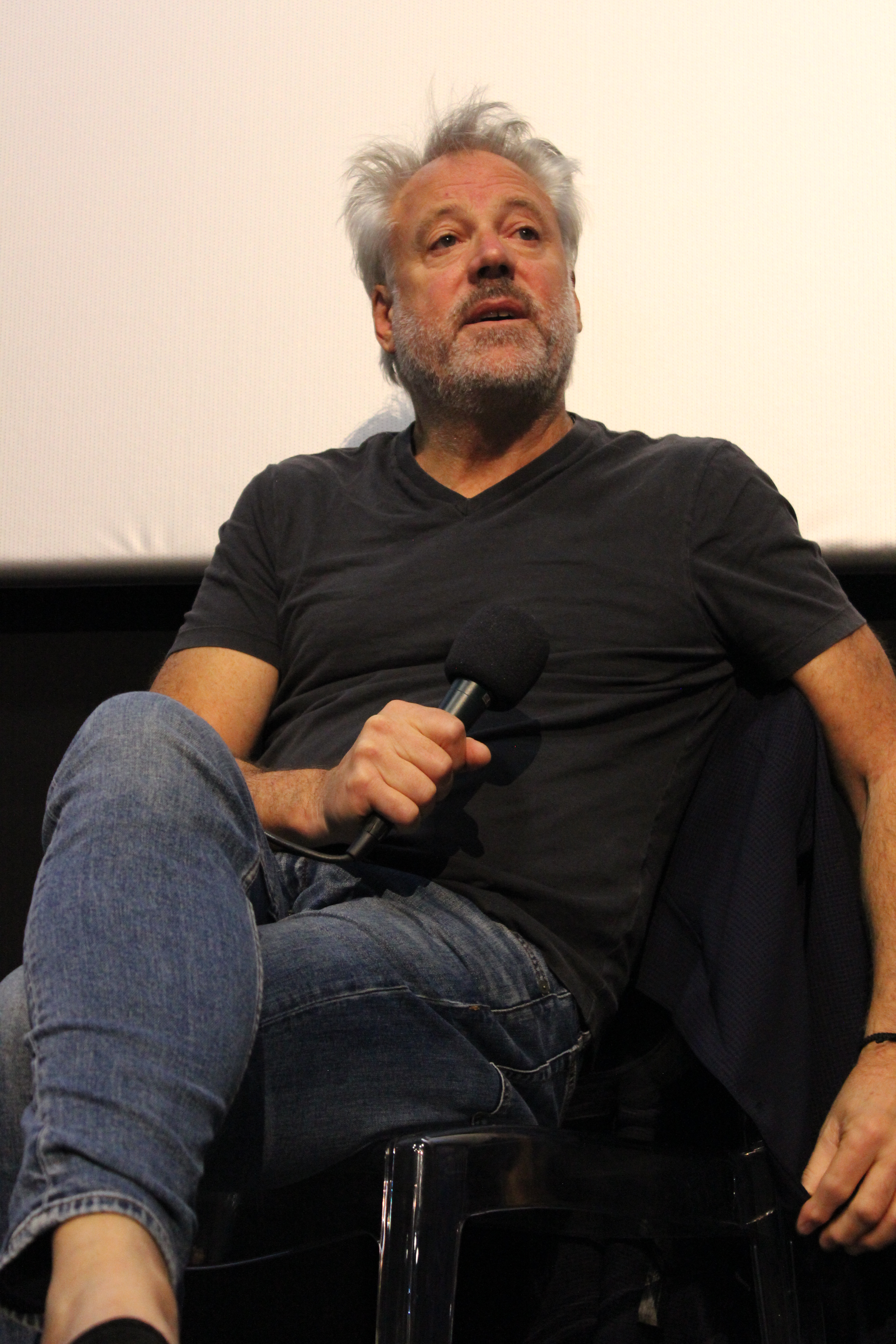
- Pfister in 2025
- Born: Walter C. Pfister; July 8, 1961 (age 65); Chicago, Illinois, U.S.
- Education: AFI Conservatory
- Years active: 1988–2012 (cinematography); 2014–present (director)
- Organization(s): American Society of Cinematographers; British Society of Cinematographers
- Spouses: Anna Julien (m. 1992; div. 2015); Loan Chabanol (m. 2018)
- Children: 3, including Claire Julien

Walter C. Pfister (born July 8, 1961) is an American director and former cinematographer.

He is known for his partnership with director Christopher Nolan, working as a cinematographer in all of his films from 2000 to 2012, winning the Academy Award for Best Cinematography for Inception (2010).

Pfister transitioned to a career as a director, debuting with Transcendence (2014). He subsequently has directed commercials and television, including episodes of Flaked and The Tick.

== Early life ==
Pfister was born in Chicago, Illinois, and raised in the New York City suburb of Irvington-on-Hudson. He is the son of Patricia Ann (née Conway) and Walter J. Pfister Jr. His grandfather was the city editor of a newspaper in Wisconsin. His father, also known as Wally, was a TV news producer, who began his career with CBS-TV in Chicago in 1955. Later, as an executive at ABC News, the elder Pfister worked with David Brinkley and Peter Jennings, covering political conventions, space flights and the civil rights movement.

When Pfister was about 11, a film company shot scenes for Shamus (1973), featuring Burt Reynolds, in his Irvington neighborhood. The boy was fascinated by the crew setting up lights and cameras. Soon afterward, he began shooting 8 mm home movies and short films. Pfister also emulated his father by shooting slides on Kodachrome film and assembling them into shows for family and friends.

== Career ==
After high school, Pfister found a job as a production assistant at a television station, WMDT-TV, in Salisbury, Maryland. Within a couple of months, he borrowed a CP-16 news camera and began shooting films on weekends, including a visual essay about a Victorian house. "I did these slow, little intricate moves around the architecture of the house", he recalls, "cut it together with music, and showed it to the production manager. They made me a cameraman. I shot very low budget PSAs for $125 a week".

Within a few months, Pfister found a job as a cameraman for a Washington news service, which provided film for TV stations around the country. He covered the United States Congress, the White House and breaking news from 1982 through 1985. In 1985 Pfister began a freelance career shooting documentaries for the PBS series Frontline and industrial videos for various Washington production companies.

In 1988, Robert Altman came to Washington to direct a mini-series for HBO called Tanner '88 (1988). Altman was looking for a real news cameraman to play that role in his show. They hired Pfister and asked him to also shoot some B-roll. When the producers saw his work, they brought Pfister on the show as the second unit cameraman. It was the first time he was exposed to acting and dramatic material.

After that experience, Pfister enrolled at the American Film Institute. During his second year, he collaborated with his classmates on a short film called "Senzeni Na?", which was nominated for an Academy Award for Best Live Action Short Film in 1991. The film told the story of a man caught up in the apartheid struggle. Pfister drew on his documentary experience, and lit it darkly and stark, using a single light so the actor could play in and out of that source.

Janusz Kamiński had just graduated from the AFI Conservatory and met Pfister that year. He saw Pfister's film and recruited him as a grip and electrician for various projects, including a few with Phedon Papamichael.

Roger Corman gave Pfister an opportunity to shoot pickup shots and inserts for a Papamichael film. It was the first time he shot a 35 mm film. After that, Pfister handled the second unit for Papamichael on Body Chemistry and also on other Corman films.

Pfister shot The Unborn, his first feature, in 1991. After that, he filmed an array of independent B-movies, typically on 15-day schedules. Many of these early films were directed by Gregory Dark.

In 1995, Papamichael asked Pfister to operate for him on Diane Keaton's Unstrung Heroes (1995).

=== Work with Christopher Nolan ===
In 1998, Pfister shot The Hi-Line in Montana in the dead of winter on a $300,000 budget, which got into the competition at Sundance Film Festival. There, he met Nolan, who had a film at the same festival.

Pfister's first collaboration with Nolan was on the neo-noir thriller Memento (2000), and after that, he became Nolan's regular cinematographer of his subsequent films.

From seven movies directed by Nolan, Pfister received four nominations for the Academy Award for Best Cinematography, winning one for his work in Inception (2010).

Pfister has stated that he "turned down many projects (including several Harry Potter films), in some cases just to be available for Nolan, or to stay home with my family."

Their collaboration came to an end in 2012, with The Dark Knight Rises, as Pfister got the chance to direct his first film, Transcendence (2014).

Hoyte van Hoytema then replaced Pfister for Nolan's Interstellar (2014), and after Pfister retired as a cinematographer, Van Hoytema became Nolan's regular, having worked together ever since.

=== Directorial work ===
In 2014, Pfister made his directorial debut with the science fiction thriller Transcendence, with Nolan acting as executive producer.

Despite receiving negative reviews and bombing at the box-office, Pfister had stated in 2015 that he is finished with working as a cinematographer and planned to continue as a director.

Ever since, Pfister had worked mostly in commercials and television series, like Flaked and The Tick.

== Personal life ==
Pfister currently resides in Los Angeles, California with his partner Loan Chabanol and has three children: Nick, actress Claire Julien, and Mia.

He is a member of the American Society of Cinematographers (ASC) since 2002, and the British Society of Cinematographers (BSC) since 2011.

== Filmography ==
=== Cinematographer ===
Direct-to-video

Year	Title	Director
1991	Lower Level	Kristine Peterson
1992	Secret Games	Gregory Dark
1992	Animal Instincts	Gregory Dark
1993	Stepmonster	Jeremy Stanford
1993	Amityville: A New Generation	John Murlowski
1993	Mirror Images 2	Gregory Dark
1994	Stranger by Night	Gregory Dark
1995	The Granny	Luca Bercovici
1997	A Kid in Aladdin's Palace	Robert L. Levy

Feature film

Year	Title	Director
1991	The Unborn	Rodman Flender
1992	In the Heat of Passion	Rodman Flender
1992	Night Rhythms	Gregory Dark
1994	Object of Obsession	Gregory Dark
1994	Secret Games 3	Gregory Dark
1999	The Hi-Line	Ron Judkins
2000	Memento	Christopher Nolan
2001	Scotland, PA	Billy Morrissette
2001	Rustin	Rick Johnson
2002	Insomnia	Christopher Nolan
2002	Laurel Canyon	Lisa Cholodenko
2003	The Italian Job	F. Gary Gray
2005	Slow Burn	Wayne Beach
2005	Batman Begins	Christopher Nolan
2006	The Prestige	Christopher Nolan
2008	The Dark Knight	Christopher Nolan
2010	Inception	Christopher Nolan
2011	Moneyball	Bennett Miller
2012	The Dark Knight Rises	Christopher Nolan

TV movies

Year	Title	Director	Notes
1991	Barbara Stanwyck: Fire and Desire	Richard Schickel	Documentary film
1992	Sketch Artist	Phedon Papamichael	
1998	Rhapsody in Bloom	Craig Saavedra	
1998	Breakfast with Einstein	Craig Shapiro	
2000	Sharing the Secret	Katt Shea	
2001	Sanctuary	Katt Shea	

=== Director ===
Film

- Transcendence (2014)

Television

Year	Title	Notes
2016	Flaked	4 episodes
2016–2017	The Tick	2 episodes (Also executive producer)

Commercials

Year	Title	Brand
2016	That's Continental	Lincoln
2017	Uncharted Waters	Lincoln
2018	Web of Fries II - Franchise Wars	Taco Bell
2019	Hope on Wheels It Takes a Village	Hyundai
2021	Fortune Favors The Brave	Crypto.com

== Awards and nominations ==
Academy Awards

Year	Title	Category	Result
2005	Batman Begins	Best Cinematography	Nominated
2006	The Prestige	Best Cinematography	Nominated
2008	The Dark Knight	Best Cinematography	Nominated
2010	Inception	Best Cinematography	Won

BAFTA Awards

Year	Title	Category	Result
2008	The Dark Knight	Best Cinematography	Nominated
2010	Inception	Best Cinematography	Nominated

American Society of Cinematographers

Year	Title	Category	Result
2005	Batman Begins	Outstanding Achievement in Cinematography	Nominated
2008	The Dark Knight	Outstanding Achievement in Cinematography	Nominated
2010	Inception	Outstanding Achievement in Cinematography	Won

Other awards

Year	Title	Award	Result
2000	Memento	Independent Spirit Award for Best Cinematography	Nominated
2005	Batman Begins	British Society of Cinematographers Award for Best Cinematography in a Theatrical Feature Film	Nominated
2006	The Prestige	British Society of Cinematographers Award for Best Cinematography in a Theatrical Feature Film	Nominated
2006	The Prestige	Gold Derby Award for Best Cinematography	Nominated
2008	The Dark Knight	Online Film Critics Society Award for Best Cinematography	Won
2008	The Dark Knight	Gold Derby Award for Best Cinematography	Won
2008	The Dark Knight	Chicago Film Critics Association Award for Best Cinematography	Won
2008	The Dark Knight	Dallas–Fort Worth Film Critics Association Award for Best Cinematography	Won
2008	The Dark Knight	Florida Film Critics Circle Award for Best Cinematography	Won
2008	The Dark Knight	British Society of Cinematographers Award for Best Cinematography in a Theatrical Feature Film	Nominated
2008	The Dark Knight	Houston Film Critics Society Award for Best Cinematography	Nominated
2010	Inception	Broadcast Film Critics Association Award for Best Cinematography	Won
2010	Inception	Chicago Film Critics Association Award for Best Cinematography	Won
2010	Inception	San Diego Film Critics Society Award for Best Cinematography	Won
2010	Inception	Houston Film Critics Society Award for Best Cinematography	Won
2010	Inception	Florida Film Critics Circle Award for Best Cinematography	Won
2010	Inception	Satellite Award for Best Cinematography	Won
2010	Inception	Online Film Critics Society Award for Best Cinematography	Nominated
2010	Inception	Alliance of Women Film Journalists for Best Cinematography	Nominated
2010	Inception	British Society of Cinematographers Award for Best Cinematography in a Theatrical Feature Film	Nominated
2010	Inception	Camerimage Golden Frog	Nominated
2010	Inception	Dallas–Fort Worth Film Critics Association Award for Best Cinematography	Nominated
2010	Inception	Gold Derby Award for Best Cinematography	Nominated
2010	Inception	Washington D.C. Area Film Critics Association Award for Best Cinematography	Nominated
2012	The Dark Knight Rises	Hollywood Film Award for Best Cinematography	Won
