= Andrew W. Garroni =

American film producer

- Occupation: Film producer
- Employer(s): Magnum Motion Pictures; Axis Films International
- Known for: Maniac
- Spouse: Catherine R. Gambino (m. 1983)

Andrew W. Garroni is an American film producer. After becoming known for producing the 1980 slasher film Maniac, Garroni became a partner in Magnum Motion Pictures. He subsequently established Axis Films International in Los Angeles, which primarily produced erotic thrillers by directors like Gregory Dark.

== Career ==
Garroni co-produced the 1980 psychological slasher film Maniac, directed by fellow New Yorker William Lustig and starring and co-written by Joe Spinell. Financed in part by Lustig's pornographic film profits and filmed between 1979 and 1980, Maniac premiered at the Cannes Film Festival. It also developed a cult following and an infamous international reputation, leading to seizures of film copies in a number of countries. Garroni would later go on to serve as an executive producer on the film's 2012 remake, which was directed by Franck Khalfoun and starred Elijah Wood.

Having founded Axis International Pictures, an independent film studio, Garroni became known for producing direct-to-video erotic thriller films. Many of these were directed by Gregory Dark, including Secret Games (1992), Animal Instincts (1992), Body of Influence (1993), all of which were adapted into successful film series. He also worked in other genres, as shown by the 1993 comedy film Buford's Beach Bunnies.

== Controversy ==
In 2007, the US Federal Trade Commission (FTC) sued Garroni, along with multiple companies controlled by Garroni and his business associates, for allegedly engaging in "a nationwide scheme to use deception and coercion to extract payments from consumers," which involved offering users a free trial of software for downloading video content and then, after the end of the trial period, displaying pop-up messages demanding payment that "[took] up much of the computer screen, obstruct[ed] consumers from working in other windows, and lack[ed] any obvious way to permit consumers to minimize or close [them]." Garroni and his associates eventually reached a settlement with the FTC, agreeing to pay over $500,000 and being banned from installing software on consumers' devices without their consent; a similar lawsuit brought against Garroni and his associates by the state of Washington was settled for $50,000, along with "provisions that limit their business practices."

== Personal life ==
Garroni has been married to Catherine R. Gambino since April 16, 1983.

== Filmography ==
Year	Title	Role	Notes
1977	The Violation of Claudia	Production Manager	as Andrew Garroni
1978	The Squeeze	Production Manager	uncredited
1980	Inferno	Production Manager	
1980	Maniac	Producer / Unit Production Manager	Also makes an uncredited appearance as Jerry
1982	Vigilante	Producer	as Andrew Garroni
1987	I Love N.Y. (1987 film)	Producer	
1991	Carnal Crimes	Producer	
1992	Mirror Images	Producer	
1992	Secret Games	Producer	
1992	The Other Woman	Producer	
1992	Night Rhythms	Producer	as Andrew Garroni
1992	Animal Instincts	Producer	as Andrew Garroni
1992	The Pamela Principle	Producer	as Andrew Garroni
1993	Body of Influence	Producer	
1993	Buford's Beach Bunnies	Producer	as Andrew Garroni
1993	Sins of the Night	Producer	
1993	Secret Games 2: The Escort	Producer	
1993	Mirror Images 2	Producer	
1994	The Other Man	Producer	
1994	Object of Obsession	Producer	
1994	The Pamela Principle 2	Producer	
1994	Animal Instincts 2	Producer	
1994	Secret Games 3	Producer	
1994	Stranger by Night	Producer	
1995	The Expert	Producer	as Andrew Garroni
1995	Undercover Heat	Producer	
1995	Friend of the Family	Producer	
1995	Siren's Kiss	Producer	
1996	Animal Instincts 3	Producer	
1996	Body of Influence 2	Producer	
1998	Naked City: Justice with a Bullet	Executive Producer	
1998	Naked City: A Killer Christmas	Executive Producer	
2012	Maniac	Executive Producer	
