= Secret Games 3 =

1994 film

- Directed by: Gregory Dark
- Written by: Tucker Johnston; Don Simmons
- Produced by: Andrew W. Garroni
- Starring: Woody Brown; Rochelle Swanson; May Karasun; Dean Scofield; Brenda Swanson; Bob Delegall; Mark Davenport; Melinda A. Grieger
- Cinematography: Wally Pfister
- Edited by: James Avalon
- Music by: Ashley Irwin
- Production company: Axis Films International
- Distributed by: VMI Worldwide (international); Notorious Pictures (Italy)
- Release date: 25 October 1994
- Running time: 87 min
- Country: United States
- Language: English

Secret Games 3 is a 1994 American erotic thriller drama film directed by Gregory Dark and produced by Andrew W. Garroni. The film's music score was composed by Ashley Irwin, and stars Woody Brown, Rochelle Swanson, May Karasun and Dean Scofield in the lead roles.

This film is a sequel to Secret Games 2: The Escort (1993) and is the third and final installment in the Secret Games film series.

== Cast ==
- Woody Brown
- Rochelle Swanson
- May Karasun
- Dean Scofield
- Brenda Swanson
- Bob Delegall
- Mark Davenport
- Melinda A. Grieger
