= Secret Games =

1992 film

- Directed by: Gregory Dark
- Produced by: Andrew W. Garroni
- Starring: Martin Hewitt; Michele Brin; Delia Sheppard; Catya Sassoon; Sabrina Mesko; Kimberly Williams; Billy Drago
- Cinematography: Thomas F. Denove; Wally Pfister
- Edited by: James Avalon
- Music by: Joseph Smith
- Production company: Axis Films International
- Distributed by: VMI Worldwide (international); Notorious Pictures (Italy)
- Release date: 13 May 1992
- Running time: 90 min.
- Country: United States
- Language: English

Secret Games is a 1992 American erotic thriller drama film directed by Gregory Dark and produced by Andrew W. Garroni. The film stars Martin Hewitt, Michele Brin, Delia Sheppard, Catya Sassoon, Sabrina Mesko, Kimberly Williams and Billy Drago in the lead roles.

This film is the first installment in the Secret Games film series, followed by Secret Games 2: The Escort and Secret Games 3, released in 1993 and 1994 respectively.

== Cast ==
- Martin Hewitt as Eric
- Michele Brin as Julianne Langford
- Delia Sheppard as Celeste
- Catya Sassoon as Sandra
- Sabrina Mesko as Pam
- Kimberly Williams as Greta
- Billy Drago as Mark Langford
- Monique Parent as Robin
- Kelly Royce as Katherine
- Gary Kasper as Rafjad
- Christian Bocher as Emil
- Alison Armitage as Nun
- Craig Stepp as Fantasy Man
- Lana Wilson as Bonnie
- John Tripp as Ron
- Paula Brandis as Brunette
- Herbert Feinberg as Detective Rogers
- Herbert Gernert as Detective Brown
- David Van Antwerp as The Waiter
- Darryl A. Imai as Japanese Businessman 1
- Roger Ito as Japanese Businessman 2
- Thomas Sasaki as Japanese Businessman 3
- Peggy Dobreer as Hooker 1
- Dorissa Curry as Hooker 2
