= Sins of the Night =

- Directed by: Gregory Dark
- Produced by: Andrew W. Garroni
- Starring: Nick Cassavetes; Deborah Shelton; Miles O'Keeffe; Richard Roundtree; Matt Roe; Courtney Taylor; Michelle Moffett; Lee Anne Beaman; Kelly Royce; Michele Brin
- Cinematography: Glenn Kershaw
- Edited by: James Avalon
- Music by: Ashley Irwin
- Release date: 13 October 1993
- Country: United States
- Language: English

Sins of the Night is a 1993 American thriller and crime film directed by Gregory Dark, produced by Andrew W. Garroni, and starring Nick Cassavetes, Deborah Shelton, Miles O'Keeffe and Richard Roundtree in the lead roles. Its music was composed by Ashley Irwin.

== Cast ==
- Nick Cassavetes as Jack Neitsche
- Deborah Shelton as Roxanne Flowers
- Miles O'Keeffe as Tony Falcone
- Richard Roundtree as Les
- Matt Roe as Ted Quincy
- Courtney Taylor as Danielle
- Michelle Moffett as Kay
- Lee Anne Beaman as Sue Ellen
- Kelly Royce as Laurel Conrad
- Michele Brin as Laura Winters
