= Carnal Crimes =

1991 film

- Directed by: Gregory Dark
- Produced by: Andrew W. Garroni
- Starring: Martin Hewitt; Linda Carol; Rich Crater; Alex Kubik; Yvette Nelson; Paula Trickey; Charisse Cooper; Prince Hughes; Doug Jones; Andre Rosey Brown; Sergio Salerno; Jasae; Julie Strain; Nicholas Celozzi; Danny Trejo
- Cinematography: Paul Desatoff
- Edited by: Bob Murawski
- Music by: Jeff Fishman; Matthew Ross
- Release date: 1991
- Running time: 87 min.
- Country: United States
- Language: English

Carnal Crimes is a 1991 American erotic thriller film directed by Gregory Dark and produced by Andrew W. Garroni. This film's music was composed by Jeff Fishman and Matthew Ross. The film starring Martin Hewitt, Linda Carol, Rich Crater, Alex Kubik, Yvette Nelson and Paula Trickey in the lead roles.

== Cast ==
- Martin Hewitt as Renny
- Linda Carol as Elise
- Rich Crater as Stanley
- Alex Kubik as Detective Ronas
- Yvette Nelson as Mia (as Yvette Stefens)
- Paula Trickey as Jasmine
- Charisse Cooper as Marcella
- Prince Hughes as Culbertson
- Doug Jones as Lang
- Andre Rosey Brown as Detective
- Sergio Salerno as Nathan
- Jasae as Christa
- Julie Strain as Ingrid
- Nicholas Celozzi as Marco
- Danny Trejo as Ticket Agent
