= Mirror Images 2 =

- Directed by: Gregory Dark
- Written by: Daryl Haney
- Produced by: Andrew W. Garroni
- Starring: Shannon Whirry; Luca Bercovici; Tom Reilly; Eva LaRue; Ken Steadman; Kristine Kelly; Sara Suzanne Brown; Frank Pesce
- Cinematography: Wally Pfister
- Edited by: Kert VanderMeulen
- Music by: Ashley Irwin
- Distributed by: Eagle Pictures (Italy)
- Release date: 1993
- Running time: 92 min.
- Country: United States
- Language: English

Mirror Images 2 is a 1993 American erotic thriller drama film directed by Gregory Dark and produced by Andrew W. Garroni. The film stars Shannon Whirry, Luca Bercovici, Tom Reilly, Eva LaRue and Ken Steadman in the lead roles. The film's music score was composed by Ashley Irwin.

== Plot ==
Carrie and Terrie are a pair of identical twins who are polar opposites. During their adolescence, Carrie was a good student and always well behaved, while Terrie was a bad girl with an insatiable sexual appetite and a habit of seducing her sister's boyfriends. The sisters are separated in youth following the tragic death of their parents. Carrie grows up to marry an abusive louse and is trapped in a sexless relationship, but her problems are about to be compounded when her wicked sister arrives in town, intent on exploiting her physical similarity to her sister to avenge herself for past wrongs. Even the help of a private detective may not be enough for Carrie when Terrie becomes allied with Carrie's own husband.

== Cast ==
- Shannon Whirry as Carrie / Terrie
- Luca Bercovici as Clete Dyker
- Tom Reilly as Jake
- Eva LaRue as Phyllis
- Ken Steadman as Dan
- Sara Suzanne Brown as Prostitute
- Kristine Kelly as Dr. Erika Rubin
- Frank Pesce as Clerk
- Richard Eden as Hugh
- Lauren Hays as Amanda
- P. J. Sparxx as the 'Present' (uncredited)
