= Secret Games 2: The Escort =

1993 film by Gregory Dark

- Directed by: Gregory Dark (as Gregory Hippolyte)
- Screenplay by: Russell Lavalle
- Produced by: Andrew W. Garroni
- Starring: Martin Hewitt; Marie Leroux; Amy Rochelle; Sara Suzanne Brown; Holly Spencer; Jennifer Peace
- Music by: Ashley Irwin
- Production company: Axis Films International
- Distributed by: VMI Worldwide (international); Notorious Pictures (Italy)
- Release dates: August 27, 1993 (United Kingdom); September 1, 1993 (United States); (video premiere)
- Running time: 85 minutes
- Country: United States
- Language: English

Secret Games 2: The Escort is a 1993 American erotic thriller film directed by Gregory Dark and starring Martin Hewitt, Amy Rochelle, and Sara Suzanne Brown. The film is a standalone sequel to Secret Games (1992), and is the second installment in the Secret Games film series, although it has no plot relation with the previous film.

== Plot ==
A married artist enters the world of intrigue and sexual exploration with a prostitute.

== Cast ==
- Martin Hewitt as Kyle Lake
- Marie Leroux as Heather Lake
- Amy Rochelle as Stacey
- Sara Suzanne Brown as Irene
- Holly Spencer as Lisa
- Jennifer Peace as Darci
- Thomas Milan as Hector
- Sherry Patterson as Lawyer
- Gregg Christie as Policeman
- Bill Williams as Policeman
- Mark Paladini as Bill

== Release ==
The film was released in Germany as Secret Games: Verbotene Reize ("Secret Games: Forbidden Charms").

Currently, this film, along with the first and third one, are distributed by VMI Worldwide in select territories, even though it was produced by Axis Films International.

== Sequel ==
A sequel titled Secret Games 3 was released in 1994.
