= Delia Sheppard =

Danish actress, model, singer and dancer (born 1960)

- Born: July 29, 1960 (age 65); Copenhagen, Denmark
- Occupations: Actress; singer; model; dancer
- Years active: 1984–present
- Modeling information
- Height: 5 ft 10 in (178 cm)
- Hair color: Blonde (dyed), Auburn

Delia Sheppard (born July 29, 1960) is a Danish actress, model, singer and dancer.

== Career ==
Sheppard began studying ballet at age 9 and went on to perform in Denmark, France and South Africa. She would most notably dance for the Royal Danish Ballet, Paris Opera and Lido de Paris. In 1985, she released a 2-track single in France called "Action." Also while in France, she worked as a fashion model, modeling the fashions of Karl Lagerfeld, Christian Dior, and Jean-Paul Gaultier.

After suffering a back injury, Sheppard moved to Hollywood to pursue a career in acting. Her acting roles include appearances in such movies as Rocky V, Any Given Sunday, Mirror Images and Night Rhythms. She has also guest starred on TV series such as Northern Exposure and Night Court.

She was Penthouse magazine's Pet of the Month for April 1988. In 2005, in The Erotic Thriller in Contemporary Cinema, Linda Ruth Williams cited Sheppard and Kira Reed as examples of actresses who worked "in B-scale erotic thrillers at the fringes of Hollywood, the obvious trajectory for a strip-circuit veteran (DTV [direct-to-video] divas Kira Reed and Delia Sheppard both started as showgirls.)"

In more recent years, Sheppard has worked as a showgirl in Las Vegas, performing in such shows as Splash and Showgirl Follies, Life in Feathers and Rhinestones.

== Filmography ==
- 2018: Show Dogs
- 2010: Dinocroc vs. Supergator (TV)
- 2009: Vampire in Vegas
- 1999: Any Given Sunday
- 1994: Point of Seduction: Body Chemistry III
- 1993: Sins of Desire
- 1992: Animal Instincts
- 1992: Night Rhythms
- 1992: Secret Games
- 1992: Mirror Images
- 1990: Rocky V
- 1990: Witchcraft II: The Temptress
- 1990: Haunting Fear
- 1989: Young Rebels
- 1974: The Spots on My Leopard
