= Lang Tong =

2014 Singaporean film

- Film poster
- Chinese: 靚汤
- Directed by: Sam Loh
- Written by: Alex Soh; Sam Loh
- Produced by: Sam Loh
- Starring: William Lawandi; Angeline Yap; Vivienne Tseng
- Distributed by: Shaw
- Release dates: December 13, 2014 (SGIFF); March 5, 2015 (Singapore)
- Running time: 83 minutes
- Country: Singapore
- Language: Mandarin
- Budget: S$500,000
- Box office: US$56,609

Lang Tong (Chinese: 靚汤; literally: "Good Soup") is a 2014 Singaporean erotic thriller film directed by Sam Loh. It stars William Lawandi, Angeline Yap, and Vivienne Tseng. Yap and Tseng play sisters involved in a love triangle with a serial womanizer, played by Lawandi. It premiered uncut in December 2014 at the Singapore International Film Festival (SGIFF) and was released in Singapore on March 5, 2015. It caused some controversy in Singapore over its graphic sex scenes, three minutes of which were cut for its theatrical release.

== Plot ==
After Zack meets his online chat friend Stephanie on a date, they begin dating. After raping her, he asks her for a large sum of money, then dumps her when she finds him with another woman. Soon after, Zack begins a relationship with Li Ling, who lives with her younger sister, Li Er. While carrying on an affair with Li Er, Zack asks Li Ling for money. Li Ling not only gives him the money but adds him to her will as a beneficiary. When Li Er finds out, she requests that Zack kill her sister, as Li Er blames Li Ling for their mother's death.

== Cast ==
- William Lawandi as Zack
- Angeline Yap as Li Er
- Vivienne Tseng as Li Ling
- Esther Goh as Stephanie
- Alan Tan as Mike

== Production ==
Loh was inspired by Japanese film Audition (1999) and 2004 Hong Kong film Dumplings. Casting was difficult because of the required nudity and sex scenes, which Loh said were partly in response to a perceived avoidance of risk-taking the local cinema. Shooting took place over two weeks in April 2014 in Tiong Bahru. It is the first in a proposed trilogy.

== Release ==
Lang Tong premiered at the Singapore International Film Festival on December 13, 2014. Yap received online harassment after the film's red-band trailer was released, which featured graphic sex and nudity. Harassers claimed she took the role to become famous, but Yap stated the reason was to conquer lingering insecurities over her body from when she had anorexia as a teenager. Following the film's premiere, three minutes were cut for the theatrical release, due to a graphic lesbian sex scene and a castration scene. It was released in Singapore on March 5, 2015, where it grossed US$56,609.

== Reception ==
Boon Chan of The Straits Times wrote that the film deserves credit for "trying to do something new", but the story is lacking. Derek Elley of Film Business Asia rated it 4/10 and said the film pushes boundaries but "isn't really much good".
