= Stranger by Night =

- VHS/DVD cover of "Stranger by Night"
- Directed by: Gregory Dark
- Written by: Rick Filon; Daryl Haney
- Produced by: Andrew W. Garroni; Rick Filon (co-producer, as Richard Filon); Walter Gernert (executive producer); Craig Thurman Suttle (line producer)
- Starring: Steven Bauer; Jennifer Rubin; William Katt
- Edited by: James Avalon (as Kent Smith)
- Music by: Ashley Irwin
- Production company: B.O.P. Films
- Distributed by: New City Releasing
- Release date: November 23, 1994
- Running time: 91 minutes
- Country: United States
- Language: English

Stranger by Night is a 1994 action film directed by Gregory Dark and starring Steven Bauer, Jennifer Rubin and William Katt. It was released on November 23, 1994.

== Plot ==
Detective Bobby Corcoran and his partner, Detective Larson, are on the hunt for a vicious serial killer. As the murderous villain stalks the city streets leaving carnage in his wake, Corcoran begins to experience blackouts and sudden fits of anger. As the detectives pursue the case, they uncover evidence suggesting that one of them may be responsible for the mysterious deaths.

== Cast ==
- Steven Bauer as Bobby Corcoran
- Jennifer Rubin as Dr. Anne Richmond
- William Katt as Troy Rooney
- Michael Parks as Detective Larson
- Luca Bercovici as Stan Richmond
- Michele Greene as Lisa
- J.J. Johnston as Bobby's Father
- Ashley Laurence as Nicole Miller
- Marla Rubinoff as Sammy
- Gary Lee Davis as Henry Herodonti
- Claire Yarlett as Sue Rooney
- Rebecca Rocheford as Melissa

== Release ==
The film was originally released on HBO as a movie of the week. Following the film's original VHS release in America, the film was later released on DVD in 1997 by A-Pix Entertainment, before a "Collector's Edition" was released as part of the "Gold Series" in 2000 by Unapix. In 1998, the film was also released as a double movie feature DVD with the 1994 film The Seventh Floor.

== Reception ==
Sandra Brennan of AllMovie gave the film one and a half stars out of five, and said: "In this crime thriller, a pair of police detectives investigates a series of related killings. As the evidence mounts, it becomes chillingly apparent that one of the two gumshoes is the guilty party." Both Video Movie Guide 2002 and VideoHound's Golden Movie Retriever gave the film two out of five stars. Entertainment Weekly awarded the film a B− grade and wrote: "Despite obvious plotting and the most annoying soundtrack this side of Flashdance, Stranger by Night is still worth watching for a bravura performance by veteran video star William Katt in a role that would work perfectly in a big-screen Quentin Tarantino version of Starsky and Hutch. Unfortunately, Katt's wonderfully obnoxious cop is only peripheral to this tale of a tough-guy detective Steven Bauer whose alcoholic blackouts are followed by discoveries of dead hookers and a parade of red herrings. None of these do anything but make you wish Katt were on screen more."
