= Sins of Desire =

- VHS cover
- Directed by: Jim Wynorski
- Written by: Peter Liapis; Mark Thomas McGee
- Based on: story by Jim Wyorski
- Produced by: Linda A. Borgeson executive Peter Liapis
- Starring: Tanya Roberts
- Cinematography: Zoran Hochstätter
- Music by: Chuck Cirino
- Production company: March Productions
- Distributed by: Cinetel Films
- Release date: 1993
- Running time: 87 min
- Country: United States
- Language: English

Sins of Desire is a 1993 erotic thriller directed by Jim Wynorski and starring Tanya Roberts. The film was one of the first of many low-budget erotic thrillers inspired by the success of Basic Instinct (1992) and made primarily for the video market. Wynorski went on to direct a number of others in the genre, such as Body Chemistry III (1994) and Body Chemistry IV (1995).

== Plot ==
Monica Waldman is a patient of sex therapist Scott Callister. She is raped while unconscious and panics, so he accidentally kills her. Scott and his wife Dr Jessica Callister bury Monica. It turns out that Monica was investigating the clinic for her boss, private eye Barry Mitchum. The Callisters get Warren Robillard to kill Mitchum; when he fails, they kill Robillard. A sister of Kay Egan, a former patient of the clinic, kills herself. Kay goes undercover at the clinic as a nurse to find out what happened, teaming up with Mitchum. They later become lovers. Kay winds up sleeping with Jessica to give Mitchum time to investigate. Eventually Mitchum, Kay, and another man try to get the Callisters in a sting. Scott accidentally shoots his wife, and Kay runs over Scott.

== Cast ==
- Tanya Roberts as Kay Egan
- Jan Michael Vincent as Warren Robillard
- Nick Cassavetes as Barry Mitchum
- Gail Harris as Monica Waldman
- John Henry Richardson as Dr. Scott Callister
- Delia Sheppard as Jessica Callister
- Carrie Stevens as Pam
- Monique Parent as Clarise

== Production ==
Wynorski later claimed Roberts was one of the few actors with whom he did not get along. The movie marked the film debut of Carrie Stevens.

== Reception ==
TV Guide thought that the film "provides adequate titillation, helped enormously by the tongue-in-cheek performances of Delia Sheppard and the mischievous Jay Richardson; their randy interplay suggests the patter of a form of sexual vaudeville. But the forgettable Cassavetes and faded Tanya Roberts are no match for their villainous candlepower, and several scripting sins help destroy this overheated detective story's credibility... Reservations aside, the heavy-breathing set will enjoy this bedroom mystery simply because there is so much activity at the sex clinic."
