= Tom Reilly (actor) =

American actor (born 1959)

- Born: Thomas Michael Reilly III; June 18, 1959 (age 66); Fort Riley North, Kansas, U.S.
- Occupation: Actor
- Years active: 1982–1997
- Children: 2

Thomas Michael Reilly III (born June 18, 1959, in Fort Riley North, Kansas) is an American actor, known for his role as Officer Bobby "Hot Dog" Nelson in CHiPs, a television series about the motorcycle officers of the California Highway Patrol.

Prior to his acting career, he was a star football player at Montclair State College (now Montclair State University) in Upper Montclair, New Jersey, but eventually dropped out.

On June 18, 1982, he went into NBC studios for a screen test. His first role on CHiPs was Officer Rick Nichols in the May 23, 1982, episode "Force Seven," a rejected pilot for a new series. After the departure of Larry Wilcox, Tom returned in the role of Officer Bobby Nelson, the new partner of Ponch (Erik Estrada). After a driving under the influence arrest on December 21, 1982, his role of Officer Bobby Nelson was featured somewhat less prominently in the final episodes, with Officer Bruce Nelson (Bruce Penhall), his younger brother, eventually becoming Ponch's partner in the episode "Fast Company." CHiPs was eventually cancelled by the spring of 1983. Bobby Nelson did not return in the reunion film, CHiPs '99.

He stopped acting in 1997. In 2005, he worked at the Orco Construction Supply in Salinas, California. He lives in the Monterey Peninsula and is currently dating singer/songwriter Judy Lynne of the Bay Area, California.

== Appearances ==
Tom made appearances on the following shows:

- CHiPs (1982/1983).... Officer Rick Nichols/Officer Bobby 'Hot Dog' Nelson
- $25,000 Pyramid (December 6–10, 1982) (TV)
- Young Warriors (1983) .... Scott
- Slaughterhouse Rock (1988) .... Richard Gardner
- Terminal Exposure (1988) .... Maxwell
- Kiss and Be Killed (1991) .... Phil
- Married... with Children (Just Shoe It) (1992) TV episode .... Caterer
- Animal Instincts (1992) .... Ken
- Mirror Images 2 (1994) (TV) .... Jake
- Sworn to Vengeance (1993) (TV)
- Animal Instincts 2 (1994) .... Man with Loose Tie
- Valley of the Dolls (1994) .... Peter D'Allesio
- Caged Hearts (1995) .... Foreman #1
- Ice Cream Man (1995) .... Charley
- Deep Cover (1996) .... Jim
- Shades of Gray (1997) .... Frank
