= Sara Suzanne Brown =

American actress

- Occupation: Actress
- Years active: 1991–1995

Sara Suzanne Brown is an American actress who is best known for her appearances in softcore erotic films between 1991 and 1995. She made her film debut in a small role as a background dancer in The Last Boy Scout (1991). Among her films include Secret Games 2: The Escort (1993), Mirror Images 2 (1993), Test Tube Teens from the Year 2000 (1993), and Killer Looks (1994).

== Filmography ==
=== Film ===
Year	Title	Role	Notes
1991	The Last Boy Scout	Dancer	
1992	The Bikini Carwash Company	Sunny	Credited as Suzanne Browne
1993	Other People's Secrets		
1993	The Bikini Carwash Company II	Sunny	Credited as Suzanne Browne
1993	Secret Games 2: The Escort	Irene	
1993	Mirror Images 2	Prostitute	
1993	Test Tube Teens from the Year 2000	Reena	Also known as Virgin Hunters
1994	Killer Looks	Diane	
1995	Lover's Leap	Rita	
1997	Bimbo Movie Bash	Rena	Archival footage from Test Tube Teens from the Year 2000 (1993)

=== Television ===
Year	Title	Role	Notes
1994	Muddling Through	Miss Lagermeister	Episode: "It's a Date"
1995	Dream On	Penny	Episode: "Tie Me Sister Lu Down, Sport"
