= Lynn-Holly Johnson =

American figure skater and actress

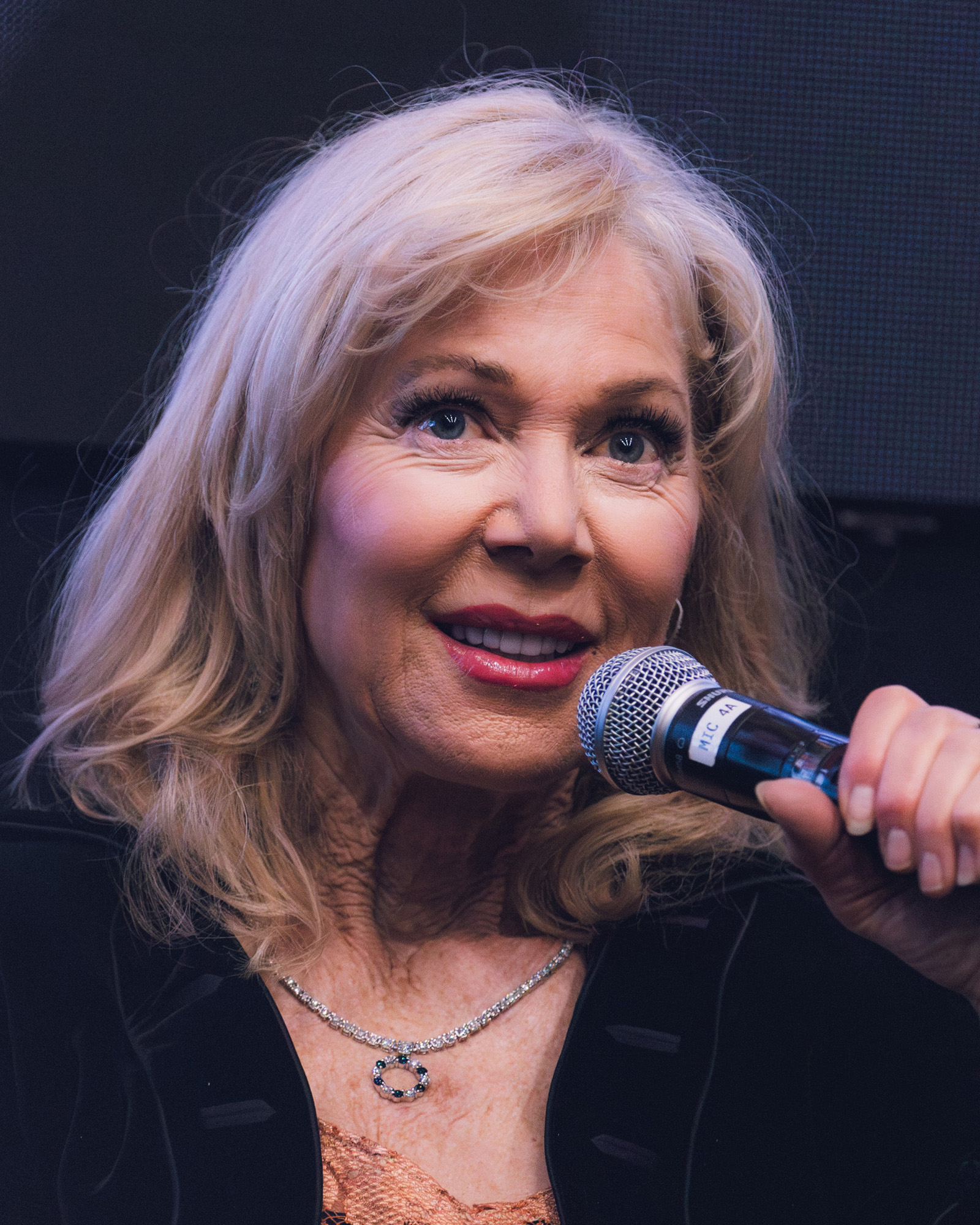
- Johnson in 2026
- Born: Lynn Holly Johnson; December 13, 1958 (age 67); Chicago, Illinois, U.S.
- Occupations: Figure skater; actress
- Years active: 1974–2010
- Spouse: Kelly Givens
- Children: 2
- Website: lynnhollyjohnson.com

Lynn-Holly Johnson (born December 13, 1958) is a retired American figure skater and former actress. Raised in suburban Chicago, Johnson worked as a child model in local commercials, and began training in figure skating at age five. In 1969, she was cast as Helen Keller in a local production of The Miracle Worker, starring opposite Rita Moreno.

Johnson achieved some success as a figure skater in the mid-1970s and competed in the 1974 U.S. Figure Skating Championships. After sustaining a leg fracture, she quit competitive skating and began performing as a figure skater with the Ice Capades. She made her feature film debut in the drama Ice Castles (1978) opposite Robby Benson, portraying a teenage figure skater who goes blind. Johnson was nominated for a Golden Globe Award for New Star of the Year for her performance. She was subsequently cast as a lead in the Walt Disney-produced horror film The Watcher in the Woods (1980), and as Bibi Dahl in the 1981 James Bond film For Your Eyes Only.

She continued to work as an actress until the mid-1990s, when she began studying to become a physician assistant.

== Early life ==
Johnson was born in Chicago, Illinois on December 13, 1958, to Margaret, a housewife, and Alan Johnson, a general contractor. She has one older brother, Gregg, a pilot for United Airlines, and an older sister, Kimberlee.

Johnson was raised in the Chicago suburb of Glenview and began training in figure skating at age four. She began skating competitively at age eleven. In addition to figure skating, Johnson also worked as a child model in Chicago, appearing in over one hundred local commercials. She graduated from Niles North High School in Skokie, Illinois.

Johnson added the hyphen to her name after a roommate wrote Johnson's name that way.

== Career ==
=== Figure skating ===
Johnson competed in the 1974 U.S. Figure Skating Championships, and won the silver medal at the novice level. After sustaining a fracture in her left leg while attempting a double axel jump, she quit skating temporarily. She subsequently gave up competitive skating in 1977 to turn professional and join the Ice Capades.

=== Acting ===
Johnson performed in some theater as a child, including a lead role as Helen Keller in a Chicago-based production of The Miracle Worker, opposite Rita Moreno, which ran between 1969 and 1970.

She was cast in her feature film debut in Ice Castles (1978), in which she portrayed Alexis "Lexie" Winston, a figure skater who is blinded after experiencing an ischemic stroke. Johnson was performing with the Ice Capades when she was cast in the production, which had been seeking out a professional ice skater who also had acting potential. The film, a romantic drama co-starring Robby Benson, was released in December 1978, and grossed $18 million in the United States. Johnson, who was described as "an appealing young woman who actually happens to be a good skater who can act" by film critic Roger Ebert, was nominated for a Golden Globe for New Star of the Year for her performance in the film.

Johnson was subsequently cast in the lead role of the Disney horror drama The Watcher in the Woods. The film received a limited release in April 1980, but it was soon withdrawn and not given a wider release until October 1981. Also in 1981, Johnson had a supporting role as Bibi Dahl in the James Bond movie For Your Eyes Only . In For Your Eyes Only, she played a figure skater who has a crush on James Bond, played by Roger Moore. In 1984, Johnson starred in Where the Boys Are '84, a remake of the 1960 film of the same name. The film was a critical and box-office failure.

Johnson continued to appear in several low-budget films throughout the 1980s and 1990s, starring as a kidnapping victim opposite Salvador Sánchez in the thriller Angel River (1986), in the science fiction horror film The Falling (1986) opposite Dennis Christopher, and the Greydon Clark-directed thriller Out of Sight, Out of Mind (1990) opposite Susan Blakely and Richard Masur.

In 1996, Johnson retired from acting to concentrate on her family. In 2007, she returned to acting in a community theater production of It's a Wonderful Life with the Newport Beach Repertory Theater.

== Personal life ==
Johnson is married to architect Kelly Givens, with whom she resides Los Angeles, California. The couple have one son and one daughter.

Between 1993 and 1996, Johnson studied to become a physician assistant and served as a medical missionary in Mexico and Guatemala.

In January 2010, Johnson suffered a stroke while on a flight from Florida to California. The stroke left her with temporary expressive aphasia and loss of motor control in her left arm. Upon landing at John Wayne Airport, Johnson fell three times in the airport terminal and was unable to speak. She was immediately hospitalized, where it was determined that the stroke had been brought on by a patent foramen ovale, a congenital heart defect that had gone undiagnosed. She subsequently underwent open-heart surgery to treat the condition. Her father also suffered from the condition, and, after her diagnosis, Johnson's brother, Gregg, was also diagnosed with it.

== Filmography ==
=== Film ===
Year	Title	Role	Notes	Ref.
1978	Ice Castles	Alexis "Lexie" Winston		
1980	The Watcher in the Woods	Jan Curtis		
1981	For Your Eyes Only	Bibi Dahl		
1984	Where the Boys Are '84	Laurie Jameson		
1984	More Than Murder	Sandy	Television film	
1986	Angel River	Jensie		
1987	The Falling	Samantha	Alternative title: Alien Predators	
1988	The Sisterhood	Marya	Alternative title: Caged Woman	
1989	Hyper Space	Arias Christensen	Alternative title: Space Rangers	
1990	Out of Sight, Out of Mind	Kathy Jordan	Alternative titles: Sight Unseen; Out of Sight, Out of Her Mind	
1990	Diggin' Up Business	Tesia Papadapacropolis	Alternative title: Say Bye-Bye	
1993	The Criminal Mind	Mrs. Augustine		
1996	Fugitive X: Innocent Target	Kara	Television film	

=== Television ===
Year	Title	Role	Notes	Ref.
1982	CHiPs	Ellen Getraer	Episode: "Fallout"	
1983	Matt Houston	Cindy Gaines	Episode: "A Deadly Parlay"	
1983	Trapper John, M.D.	Dani Piper	Episode: "I Only Have Ice for You"	
1986	MacGyver	Ingrid Bannister	Episode: "The Enemy Within"	
1987	The Law & Harry McGraw	Susan Bishop	Episode: "Angela's Secret"	
1987	Ohara	Becki Dutton	Episode: "Hot Rocks"	
2009	Tales from Dark Fall	Prof. Carlo	Episode: "Hit or Miss"	

== Stage credits ==
Year	Title	Role	Notes	Ref.
1969–1970	The Miracle Worker	Helen Keller	Ivanhoe Theater	
2007	It's a Wonderful Life		Newport Beach Repertory Theater	

== Accolades ==
Award/association	Year	Category	Nominated work	Result	Ref.
Golden Globe Awards	1980	New Star of the Year – Actress	Ice Castles	Nominated	
Golden Raspberry Awards	1985	Worst Supporting Actress	Where the Boys Are '84	Won	
