= Slaughterhouse Rock =

1987 film by Dimitri Logothetis

- Theatrical poster
- Directed by: Dimitri Logothetis
- Written by: Ted Landon; Sandra Willard; Nora Goodman
- Story by: Dimitri Logothetis
- Produced by: Louis George
- Starring: Nicholas Celozzi; Tom Reilly; Donna Denton; Hope Marie Carlton; Tamara Hyler; Steven Brian Smith; Ty Miller; Toni Basil
- Cinematography: Nicholas von Sternberg
- Edited by: Daniel Gross
- Music by: Mark Mothersbaugh; Gerald Casale
- Production companies: Arista Films; First American Film Capital
- Distributed by: Taurus Entertainment Company
- Release dates: October 21, 1987 (Milan); January 22, 1988 (Chicago)
- Running time: 90 minutes
- Country: United States
- Language: English
- Budget: $2.5 million

Slaughterhouse Rock (also known as Hell Island in the United Kingdom) is a 1987 American supernatural horror film directed by Dimitri Logothetis, and starring Nicholas Celozzi, Tom Reilly, Donna Denton, Hope Marie Carlton, Tammara Hyler, Steven Brian Smith, Ty Miller, and Toni Basil. Its plot follows a college student who travels to Alcatraz Island with his friends, after having recurring nightmares of a rock band that was killed there.

== Plot ==
Alex Gardner (Nicholas Celozzi), a college student suffers from recurring nightmares in which he experiences the deaths of the victims of a vicious killer who lived on Alcatraz, before it became a prison. When the nightmares begin manifesting in reality, and his friends see him hovering over his bed, his teacher (Donna Denton), an occultist, tells him to go to the island to face down the ghost of the killer.

The friends become stranded on the island, and Alex's brother Richard (Tom Reilly) becomes possessed, killing some friends and raping one of the girls. Alex is aided in his quest by the ghost of Sammy Mitchell (Toni Basil), a singer for the band Bodybag. Sammy teaches Alex how to levitate and escape his body, and is also the subject of a dance routine, intercut into the film. The friends lure the ghost of the killer, and Alex's brother into the prison chapel, and blow it up, releasing the curse.

== Cast ==
- Toni Basil as Sammy Mitchell
- Nicholas Celozzi as Alex Gardner
- Tom Reilly as Richard Gardner
- Donna Denton as Carolyn Harding
- Hope Marie Carlton as Krista Halpern
- Tammy Hyler as Jan Squire
- Steven Brian Smith as Jack
- Ty Miller as Marty
- Al Fleming as The Commandant and Monster
- Michael J. Scherlis as Tour Guide

== Production ==
Principal photography of Slaughterhouse Rock took place in Los Angeles, California, beginning March 23, 1987. Actor Larry Wilcox would reportedly star in the film, but was not involved with the production. The film's music score was provided by Mark Mothersbaugh and Gerald Casale of the new wave band Devo.

== Release ==
Slaughterhouse Rock premiered at Milan on October 21st, 1987 at MIFED (Mercato internazionale del film e del documentario).

It later premiered in Chicago, Illinois on January 22, 1988, before premiering in New York City on May 21 of that year.

=== Critical response ===
Caryn James of The New York Times wrote, “There is always a way to improve on a stock formula, but Slaughterhouse Rock [...] manages to make these elements seem much worse and even more tired than they are,” though she praised the performance of Steve Brian Smith.

=== Home media ===
RCA/Columbia Pictures Home Video (now Sony Pictures Home Entertainment) released Slaughterhouse Rock on VHS in 1988, while Image Entertainment later released the film on Laserdisc on November 18, 1992. On December 5, 2016, Code Red released Slaughterhouse Rock on Blu-ray, which was followed by a DVD release by Kino Lorber on May 30, 2017. It has also been released on blu-ray by Vinegar Syndrome as part of a two-disk set with Hard Rock Zombies.
