= The Falling (1986 film) =

- Theatrical poster
- Directed by: Deran Sarafian
- Written by: Deran Sarafian; Noah Bloch
- Produced by: Deran Sarafian
- Starring: Dennis Christopher; Martin Hewitt; Lynn-Holly Johnson
- Cinematography: Tote Trenas
- Edited by: Dennis Hill
- Music by: Thomas Chase; Steve Rucker; Dicotomía
- Production company: Continental Motion Pictures Corporation
- Distributed by: Trans World Entertainment
- Release date: August 1986
- Running time: 90 minutes
- Countries: United States; Spain
- Language: English
- Box office: $2,554

The Falling (also known as Alien Predators and Mutant 2) is a 1986 American-Spanish science fiction horror film starring Dennis Christopher, Martin Hewitt, and Lynn-Holly Johnson.

== Synopsis ==
Three teenagers vacationing in Spain drive through a town where the space station Skylab crashed several years earlier, bringing with it alien organisms that transform their human hosts into flesh-eating monsters.

== Cast ==
- Dennis Christopher as Damon
- Martin Hewitt as Michael
- Lynn-Holly Johnson as Samantha
- Luis Prendes as Dr. Tracer
- J.O. Bosso as Captain J.J. Wells
- Yousaf Bokhari as Mr. Bodi
- Yolanda Palomo as Mrs. Bodi
- Christina Augustin as Baby Bodi
- Christina San Juan as Waitress
- Pablo Garcia as Man in Store
- Carlos Ramirez as Gas Station Attendant

== Production ==
The film was shot in Spain in 1984 as The Falling.

== Release ==
The Falling was released in the United Kingdom on home video in 1986 as Mutant 2. The Falling was initially aimed at release along with two other productions from Film Ventures Intl., the film was shelved when the company experienced financial troubles and was released by the home video firm turned into a theatrical distributor, Trans World Entertainment.

The Falling was distributed in the United States as Alien Predator in February 1987 with a 90 minute running time. The film was promoted as Alien Predators while the title screen referred to the film as Alien Predator.

== Reception ==
A reviewer credited as "Lor." of Variety reviewed the film under its title of Alien Predator. "Lor." described the film as a "tedious presentation" and that it was derivative of The Andromeda Strain and Alien. "Lor." went on to note that Sarafian's direction "is sluggish, relying on pointless car chases to try and drum up excitement. His script is worse, filled with mushy spectres by the three young leads and a series of idiotic references to Rod Sterling's The Twilight Zone."
