= Dean Scofield =

American actor

Dean Scofield (born January 12, 1957, Alhambra, California) is an American actor who has provided the voice of the recurring character Johnny Sasaki in Metal Gear Solid, Metal Gear Solid: The Twin Snakes and Metal Gear Solid 2: Sons of Liberty.

== Career ==
Scofield was credited as Dino Schofield in Metal Gear Solid because he thought that the union would not support the work on the game. Scofield also played the role of Veronica's nephew and Archie Bunker's gay waiter Fred Rooney in the sitcom television series Archie Bunker's Place. His final appearance on Archie Bunker's Place was in the episode "Archie Fixes Up Fred".

== Filmography ==
=== Film ===
Year	Title	Role	Notes
1988	Survival Quest	Olivia's Fiancé	
1994	Double Exposure	Maria's Lover	
1994	Animal Instincts II	David	
1994	Secret Games 3	Alex Larson	
1994	Prehysteria! 2	Mr. Wellington	
1994	Fist of Legend	Voice	
1995	Project Metalbeast	Ferraro	
1995	My Father Is a Hero	Voice	
1996	Iron Monkey 2	Voice	
1997	Dusting Cliff 7	Mitch Stevens	
1998	Black Thunder	Captain Jones	
1999	Tycus	Studious Man	
1999	The Incredible Genie	Josh	
2000	The Flunky	Producer	
2003	Elysium	Voice	
2014	Cru	Dr. Shaffrey	
2023	Painting Jane	Lou Anderson	
2023	Single Bells	Banquet Guest	

=== Television ===
Year	Title	Role	Notes
1978	Cotton Candy	Bart Bates	Television film
1979–1980	Archie Bunker's Place	Fred	5 episodes
1983, 1985	Simon & Simon	Travis / Allen Davis	2 episodes
1984	The Master	Terrorist Waiter	Episode: "Hostages"
1985	Hill Street Blues	Reporter	Episode: "Hacked to Pieces"
1986	General Hospital	Dave	3 episodes
1986	Highway to Heaven	Brad	2 episodes
1988	Something Is Out There	Andrew Brockhurst	2 episodes
1990	Cop Rock	Tommy Ryan	3 episodes
1992	Likely Suspects	Eric Blakeny	Episode: "Breaking Up Is Hard to Do"
1992	Desperate Choices: To Save My Child	John Schuyler	Television film
1993	Eden	Paul	3 episodes
1994	Saved by the Bell: The College Years	Reverend Dunlap	Episode: "Wedding Bells"
1997, 1999	E! True Hollywood Story	Narrator	2 episodes
1998	Mike Hammer, Private Eye	Carl Prichard	Episode: "A Candidate for Murder"
2011	Days of Our Lives	Lawyer James Rosen	Episode #1.11618
2012–2013	Room for Rent	Cousin Carl	3 episodes
2019	Weird City	Ron Maxsome	Episode: "The One"
