= Devil in the Flesh 2 =

- DVD cover
- Directed by: Marcus Spiegel
- Written by: Richard Brandes
- Produced by: Richard Brandes
- Starring: Jodi Lyn O'Keefe; Jsu Garcia; Katherine Kendall; Jeanette Brox; Christiana Frank
- Cinematography: M. David Mullen
- Edited by: Ed Santiago
- Music by: Steve Gurevitch
- Production companies: Alliance Atlantis Communications; Unapix Entertainment Productions
- Distributed by: Allumination Filmworks
- Release date: September 8, 2000
- Running time: 92 minutes
- Countries: United States; Canada
- Language: English

Devil in the Flesh 2 (also known as Teacher's Pet) is a 2000 erotic thriller film directed by Marcus Spiegel. It is a sequel to Devil in the Flesh (1998), which stars Rose McGowan.

== Plot ==
Debbie Strand is a beautiful psychopath who escapes from the mental institution she was sent off to in the first installment of the series when a female orderly tries to sexually assault her. After a teenage girl who took Debbie in her car dies when retreating from Debbie and accidentally impaling herself, Debbie steals both the girl's identity and her car, and heads off to the college the dead girl was supposed to attend as a freshman.

There, Debbie instantly develops a psychotic crush on her dashing writing professor, Dr. Sam Deckner after being impressed by their shared interests as well as his personality on their first interaction. Debbie assumed the role of a wealthy man's daughter while going by the deceased girl's name "Tracy Carlay" as her new identity. She is checked into same room with Laney, a naive girl who she soon influences. Further interactions with Sam renders Debbie further psychotic, and, in order to strengthen their love, she soon begins killing anyone who she believes served as a threat to their perceived relationship.

Laney, her computer-literate roommate discovers the truth about Debbie's past, and instantly panics. She later falls to her death after being agitated by Debbie's presence. Debbie described this as a suicide to the cops and soon begins to stalk Sam, unable to move on from their earlier intimate encounter. She repeatedly threatens Carla, Sam's girlfriend, especially after Carla revealed to Sam that she was pregnant by him. Debbie, out of jealousy, throws a stone at the glass window while the couple were getting intimate and prompted a police inquiry.

Debbie becomes more unhinged and goes over to Carla's house at night, finds a knife and lurks around, intent on murdering Carla but is hindered by the presence of two cops both of whom she wounded before inadvertently stabbing herself in a scuffle with Sam.

The film ends with a stabbed Debbie being picked off the road by the father of the real Tracy Carlay, the teenage girl who had picked up Debbie in the film's opening. Tracy's father comments on Debbie's striking resemblance with his daughter and makes mention of his daughter's troubles at school.

== Cast ==
- Jodi Lyn O'Keefe as Debbie Strand / Tracy Carlay
- Jsu Garcia as Sam Deckner
- Sarah Lancaster as Tracy Carlay
- Katherine Kendall as Carla Briggs
- Jeanette Brox as Laney
- Christiana Frank as Sydney Hollings
- Todd Robert Anderson as Deputy Toby Taylor
- Bill Gratton as Sheriff Bill Taylor
