= Florida Film Critics Circle Award for Best Cinematography =

Film award

The Florida Film Critics Circle Award for Best Cinematography is an award given by the Florida Film Critics Circle to honor the finest achievements in filmmaking.

== Winners ==
=== 1990s ===
Year	Winner	Cinematographer(s)
1996	The English Patient	John Seale
1997	L.A. Confidential	Dante Spinotti
1998	Saving Private Ryan	Janusz Kamiński
1999	Bringing Out the Dead	Robert Richardson
1999	Snow Falling on Cedars	Robert Richardson

=== 2000s ===
Year	Winner	Cinematographer(s)
2000	Crouching Tiger, Hidden Dragon (Wo hu cang long)	Peter Pau
2001	The Man Who Wasn't There	Roger Deakins
2002	Far from Heaven	Edward Lachman
2003	The Lord of the Rings: The Return of the King	Andrew Lesnie
2004	Hero (Ying xiong)	Christopher Doyle
2005	Brokeback Mountain	Rodrigo Prieto
2006	Pan's Labyrinth (El laberinto del fauno)	Guillermo Navarro
2007	The Assassination of Jesse James by the Coward Robert Ford	Roger Deakins
2007	No Country for Old Men	Roger Deakins
2008	The Dark Knight	Wally Pfister
2009	Avatar	Mauro Fiore

=== 2010s ===
Year	Winner	Cinematographer(s)
2010	Inception	Wally Pfister
2011	The Tree of Life	Emmanuel Lubezki
2012	Skyfall	Roger Deakins
2013	Gravity	Emmanuel Lubezki
2014	Interstellar	Hoyte van Hoytema
2015	Mad Max: Fury Road	John Seale
2016	La La Land	Linus Sandgren
2017	Blade Runner 2049	Roger Deakins
2018	Cold War	Łukasz Żal
2019	1917	Roger Deakins

=== 2020s ===
Year	Winner	Cinematographer(s)
2020	Mank	Erik Messerschmidt
2021	The Power of the Dog	Ari Wegner
2022	Decision To Leave	Kim Ji-yong
2023	John Wick: Chapter 4	Dan Laustsen
2024	The Brutalist	Lol Crawley
