= Shannon Whirry =

American actress

- Born: Shannon Meta Whirry; 1964 or 1965 (age 60–61); Green Lake, Wisconsin, U.S.
- Occupation: Actress
- Years active: 1991–present

Shannon Whirry (born 1964/1965) is an American actress.

== Early life ==
Shannon Meta Whirry was born in Green Lake, Wisconsin, United States, the daughter of Sherril Jean "Sherry" (née Kemnitz; 1944–2016) and Russell Clyde Whirry (1943–1988).

== Career ==
A native of Green Lake, Wisconsin, where she was the salutatorian of her 1983 high school graduating class, in 1985 Whirry was accepted to study at the American Academy of Dramatic Arts, one of only 365 accepted out of 3,000 applicants and one of only 65 to graduate the 2-year program. While attempting to establish her career in New York, Whirry worked as a bartender, took a number of small bit roles and appeared in a commercial for FedEx; the latter work finally allowed her to join the Screen Actors Guild. Her first film role was in the action film Out for Justice starring Steven Seagal.

She thereafter began to work in a number of direct-to-video erotic B-movies and unrated thrillers, concurrent with Tanya Roberts, Maria Ford, and Shannon Tweed, who appeared in the same kinds of films at the time. She starred in Gregory Hippolyte's productions of Animal Instincts I and II, Body of Influence, and Mirror Images II. Entertainment Weekly referred to Whirry and Hippolyte as "the Dietrich and Von Sternberg of the soft-core set". Other films at the time included Private Obsession and Playback, a Playboy production.

In the late 1990s, she transitioned from erotic thrillers into a series of roles on mainstream network television and films, including action, sci-fi and horror genres. She had a recurring role as Mike Hammer's secretary Velda in the television series Mike Hammer, Private Eye and made guest appearances on such shows as ER, Felicity, Seinfeld, V.I.P., Murphy Brown, Malcolm in the Middle and Nash Bridges. She also had a small role in the Jim Carrey film Me, Myself & Irene (2000).

In 2007, she appeared on a BBC TV miniseries, Nuclear Secrets, playing Kitty Oppenheimer, the wife of Robert Oppenheimer.

She occasionally performs with theater companies in Arizona, where she lives and has continued appearing in small roles in films, including the independent film Raising Buchanan in 2019.

== Filmography ==
=== Film ===
| Year | Title | Role | Notes |
|---|---|---|---|
| 1991 | Out For Justice | Terry Malloy | |
| 1992 | Animal Instincts | Joanna Cole | Video |
| 1993 | Body of Influence | Laura/Lana | Video |
| 1993 | Sliver | Woman Looking In Mirror | |
| 1993 | Mirror Images 2 | Carrie/Terrie | Video |
| 1994 | Animal Instincts 2 | Joanna Cole | Video |
| 1994 | The Gift | Sitting Woman | TV movie |
| 1994 | Lady in Waiting | Lori | |
| 1995 | Texas Justice | Rebecca | TV movie |
| 1995 | Private Obsession | Emmanuelle Griffith | Video |
| 1995 | The Granny | Kelly Gargoli | Video |
| 1995 | Dangerous Prey | Robin | |
| 1995 | Fatal Pursuit | Jill | |
| 1996 | Playback | Karen | |
| 1996 | Exit | Diane | Video |
| 1996 | Omega Doom | Zed, Droid Leader | Video |
| 1996 | Ringer | Kristin / Tracy | |
| 1997 | Retroactive | Rayanne Lloyd | |
| 1999 | Active Stealth | Gina Murphy | Video |
| 2000 | The Prophet's Game | Barbara "Barb" | |
| 2000 | Me, Myself & Irene | Beautiful Mom | |
| 2001 | Mach 2 | Shannon Carpenter | |
| 2001 | Lying in Wait | Lori | |
| 2001 | Outlaw | Liz | |
| 2008 | Jolene | Teacher | |
| 2009 | Ingenious | Lydia | |
| 2009 | Middle Men | Screaming Mother | |
| 2010 | Everything Must Go | Nurse | |
| 2010 | Dead West | Sarah Dust | |
| 2012 | Out of Focus | Detective Jessie Johnston | Short |
| 2019 | Raising Buchanan | Parnella Monroe | |

=== Television ===
| Year | Title | Role | Notes |
|---|---|---|---|
| 1992 | Santa Barbara | Lola | Episode: "Episode #1.2094" |
| 1993 | Down the Shore | Sue | Episode: "The Last Temptation of Eddie: Part 1 & 2" |
| 1993 | Eden | Lauren's Friend | Episode: "Eden 6" |
| 1993 | Silk Stalkings | Karen Daniels | Episode: "Look the Other Way" |
| 1997 | Murder One | Deborah Cummings | Episode: "Chapter Ten, Year Two" |
| 1997 | Murphy Brown | Amber | Episode: "Blind Date" |
| 1997 | Nash Bridges | Suzanne | Episode: "Moving Target" |
| 1997 | Pacific Blue | Kay McNeil | Episode: "Ties That Bind" |
| 1997 | Seinfeld | Cute Girl | Episode: "The Butter Shave" |
| 1997‍–‍98 | Mike Hammer, Private Eye | Velda | Main cast |
| 1998 | Silk Stalkings | Victoria Tremain | Episode: "Passion and the Palm Beach Detectives" |
| 1999 | Air America | Dr. Veronica Brady | Episode: "Fear of Flying" |
| 1999 | Sons of Thunder | Sabrina | Episode: "Daddy's Girl" |
| 1999 | V.I.P. | Katherine Johnson | Episode: "Why 2 Kay" |
| 2000 | City of Angels | Gina | Recurring cast: Season 2 |
| 2001 | Malcolm in the Middle | Beautiful Woman | Episode: "Evacuation" |
| 2001 | Black Scorpion | Vox Populi | Episode: "Face the Music" |
| 2001 | Felicity | Barbara "Barb" Jones | Episode: "Boooz" |
| 2002 | Flatland | Gina | Episode: "Triptych" |
| 2003 | ER | Doreen Brant | Episode: "No Good Deed Goes Unpunished" |
| 2007 | Nuclear Secrets | Kitty Oppenheimer | Episode: "Superspy" & "Superbomb" |
