= Two Moon Junction =

1988 film by Zalman King

- Theatrical release poster
- Directed by: Zalman King
- Screenplay by: Zalman King
- Story by: Zalman King; MacGregor Douglas
- Produced by: Donald P. Borchers
- Starring: Sherilyn Fenn; Richard Tyson; Louise Fletcher; Burl Ives; Kristy McNichol
- Cinematography: Mark Plummer
- Edited by: Marc Grossman
- Music by: Jonathan Elias
- Production companies: DDM Film Corporation; Lorimar Motion Pictures
- Distributed by: Lorimar Motion Pictures; The Samuel Goldwyn Company
- Release date: April 22, 1988
- Running time: 104 minutes
- Country: United States
- Language: English
- Box office: $1.5 million (US)

Two Moon Junction is a 1988 American erotic romantic drama film written and directed by Zalman King, and starring Sherilyn Fenn and Richard Tyson. The original music score is composed by Jonathan Elias.

Burl Ives and Hervé Villechaize appear in their final film roles. It is the theatrical film debut of Milla Jovovich.

== Plot ==
April Delongpre is the eldest daughter of a powerful Alabama senator and heiress to an old and respectable Southern family. After graduating from college, April returns home to her parents’ house for the summer to await her semi arranged marriage to her fiancé, Chad Douglas Fairchild. When a carnival comes to the town, April and Chad accompany April's two younger sisters Samantha and Jody to the fairgrounds, where April sees from a distance a rugged carnival roustabout, semi-truck owner-operator and drifter named Perry Tyson. When April accidentally leaves her wallet behind in one of the rides, Perry returns it to her and introduces himself (after having looked inside and gotten April's name and home address). Intrigued by the mysterious drifter, April returns to the carnival that evening to talk with Perry, but she refuses his advances.

A few days later, while Chad is away for the weekend on business and her parents and siblings are also away for vacation, April begins a sordid affair with Perry when he shows up one morning at April's house and uses her shower. Despite telling him to leave, April cannot restrain her urges for Perry and the two of them have sex. April cries afterwards over it and Perry leaves. The next day, April visits her grandmother Belle Delongpre, April's confidante about her past infatuations. After April leaves, Belle asks the local sheriff Earl Hawkins to keep an eye on her.

April returns to the carnival that evening to see Perry, only to become dismayed and jealous when she finds him drunk and in the company of a fellow drifter and cowgirl who introduces herself as Patti Jean who takes April with her in Perry's truck for a "bourbon run" to get more hard liquor for him. During the drive, Patti rambles on about her life and hometown and clearly flirts with April. At the carnival, when a ride malfunctions and endangers the people on it, Perry gets into a brawl with other fairground workers. Patti Jean and April return and join in on the brawl until Perry's pet dog Tom is killed by one of the workers and the rest of them order Perry and the women to leave.

After burying Tom in a field, April and Patti Jean take the depressed Perry out to a bar and pool hall where Patti Jean again flirts with April and invites her to dance with her. However, instead of taking advantage of April's curiosity, Patti Jean urges her to go back to Perry and continue their tryst. After Patti Jean leaves town, Perry takes April on a ride on his motorcycle, where they check into a motel and have sex again only for her to cry after once again.

In the morning, April leaves Perry to pick up her car which she left behind at the fairgrounds after the carnival moves out and to make a phone call to Belle's house where she asked Delilah, her grandmother's maid and friend, to see if Chad or her parents called to acquire her whereabouts unaware that Bella was listening in on the conversation and April unaware that Sheriff Hawkins is following her. April returns to the motel and gets into a big argument with Perry when she catches him flirting with two motel housekeepers which get the hotel guests and the cheer on for the drama. To defuse their tension, she takes him out to have breakfast at a local restaurant, where she tells him more about her life, her family history and about a family property at the edge of a lake called the Two Moon Junction which is her childhood playground. However, April tells Perry that they must part ways, as she must return home and to her privileged life. After she leaves, Sheriff Hawkins appears and arrests Perry. Hawkins takes him to the field where Perry buried his dog which was the property of elderly farmers father and son Jonah Sr. and Jonah Jr.

Hawkins said he and his deputies received a complaint from the Jonahs that someone trespassed on their property and buried a dead animal. The Jonahs believed in superstition that a dead animal in their field was a bad omen and would cause their cows to giving bloody milk or could attract a swarm of locust and destroy their crops. However, the Jonahs were willing to forgive only if Perry would apologize, exhume his dog and they would build a bonfire to cremate it. Afterwards, in a car ride with Hawkins while the deputies drive Perry's semi-truck, they have a conversation were Hawkins asks where Perry is originally from and the latter says he is from Florida and then drives him to the Mississippi-Alabama state line and gives Perry an implied threat never to come around the area again.

A few weeks later, on the day before April's wedding, she has another encounter with Perry, who shows up to work at constructing the tents on her family's property for the wedding reception. He is also spotted by Belle, who threatens him to leave town and offers him a bribe, but Perry refuses to accept it. Belle then makes a call to Sheriff Hawkins to inform him that April's lover is back in town and to deal with it. That evening, while Chad is having his bachelor party, April shows up at the Two Moon Junction, a run-down pavilion at the edge of a lake, where she meets Perry, who had left a message to meet him there. April offers Perry money to leave town and never return, but Perry again refuses and urges her to act out her fantasies that she has long suppressed since her childhood. April and Perry again make love, only for April to again cry and walk out on Perry for good to return to her life.

The next morning on the day of the wedding, as Perry is preparing to leave town, one of Sheriff Hawkins's deputies attempts to kill Perry, but he subdues the deputy and escapes. At the church, as April is preparing to walk down the aisle to the altar, April hesitates at first indicating she is having second thought but Belle tries to persuade her not to abandon her privileged lifestyle and lies to her that Perry left town for a bribe. April does not believe her, but she nevertheless walks down the church aisle to marry Chad. Sometime later, Perry is seen working as a dishwasher at a blues nightclub in another town. After work, as Perry returns to his motel room for the night to care and feed his new pet dog Sam, he finds April in his bathroom taking a shower, reliving their first sexual encounter. Perry joins April and they kiss. April, wearing Chad's wedding ring, which is assumed April ran away from the alter, makes love with Perry in the shower.

== Cast ==
- Sherilyn Fenn as April DeLongpre
- Richard Tyson as Perry Tyson
- Louise Fletcher as Belle DeLongpre
- Burl Ives as Sheriff Earl Hawkins
- Kristy McNichol as Patti Jean
- Martin Hewitt as Chad Douglas Fairchild
- Juanita Moore as Delilah
- Don Galloway as Senator DeLongpre
- Millie Perkins as Mrs. DeLongpre
- Milla Jovovich as Samantha DeLongpre
- Nicole Rosselle as Jody DeLongpre
- Kerry Remsen as Carolee
- Hervé Villechaize as Smiley
- Dabbs Greer as Kyle
- Chris Pedersen as Speed
- Luisa Leschin as Maid
- Screamin' Jay Hawkins as Himself

== Production ==
Donald Borchers had just left New World Pictures, where he had made a number of successful productions. He set up his own production unit and tried to make Moving Target (later made with Jason Bateman). This project fell over and Borchers was looking for another film. He knew Zalman King from when King tried to get 9½ Weeks made at New World; King showed him his script for Two Moon Junction. Borchers liked the script calling it "a page turner" and he bought the rights and raised the finance. In the original draft of the script Richard Tyson's character Perry Tyson died at the end but Borchers pressed for this to be changed.

It was Tyson's second film following Three O'Clock High. "It was magic to get cast in that role," he later said. "I was nice to a girl for the last time ever in a movie. I thought I did a good job. I get stopped for that too – all the time." King said he cast Tyson because "I was looking for someone who was a teen idol. And he did have it in that movie, I thought. It was one of the few times that I could see his beauty, because I love the way his face looked. When I met him he was a football player and he was very beefy and drank a lot of beer. And I asked him to please lose weight and he did, and for that amount of time I thought he was very, very attractive... [His character] is out of a romance novel... It was romance, although not much of a plot, and that’s what I needed: someone who was bold and strong, and was cut and ripped, and he had charm—I don’t think he was everybody’s cup of tea, 100%, but I thought he fit quite well." Sherilyn Fenn later said she thought the movie "felt really exploitative."

The film was shot throughout Los Angeles County, California, with the major sequences filmed at the Shambala Animal Preserve, which is owned and operated by actress Tippi Hedren.

== Reception ==
On review aggregator Rotten Tomatoes, the film has a 0% approval rating based on 9 reviews. On Metacritic, the film has a score of 38 out of 100 based on 11 critics, indicating "generally unfavorable reviews". Critics criticized the film's directing, plot, and dialogue.

== Sequel ==
The film was followed seven years later by a sequel, Return to Two Moon Junction. Louise Fletcher was the only significant actor to reprise a role in the sequel.

== Accolades ==
- 1988 Golden Raspberry Awards

Winner: Worst Supporting Actress - Kristy McNichol
