= Nicole (film) =

- DVD cover for 'Nicole', A.K.A. 'Crazed'
- Directed by: István Ventilla
- Written by: Louis Horvath
- Starring: Leslie Caron; Ramon Bieri; Catherine Bach; Bruce Graziano; Allen Jaffe
- Cinematography: Louis Horvath
- Production company: Zephyr
- Distributed by: Troma Entertainment (2005, DVD)
- Release date: 1978
- Running time: 88 minutes
- Country: United States
- Language: English

Nicole (also known as Crazed and The Widow's Revenge) is a 1978 American thriller directed by Istvan Ventilla and starring Leslie Caron and Catherine Bach.

== Plot ==
Nicole (Leslie Caron) is a wealthy, reclusive widow who lives alone with her murderous chauffeur Malcolm (Ramon Bieri). When she falls for Fletcher (Bruce Graziano), a successful car salesman, and makes friends with Sue (Catherine Bach), a young dancer, things begin to turn out for the better. However, when she begins to suspect that Fletcher is cheating on her, she snaps and slips into an "alternate reality of violence, sex and paranoia".
