= Animal Instincts (film) =

1992 American film

- DVD cover
- Directed by: Gregory Dark
- Screenplay by: Jon Robert Samsel; Georges des Esseintes
- Produced by: Andrew W. Garroni
- Starring: Maxwell Caulfield; Jan-Michael Vincent; Shannon Whirry; Delia Sheppard
- Cinematography: Wally Pfister
- Edited by: James Avalon
- Music by: Joseph Smith
- Production company: Wilshire Film Ventures
- Distributed by: Axis Films International
- Release date: October 21, 1992 (United States)
- Running time: 95 minutes
- Country: United States
- Language: English

Animal Instincts is a 1992 American erotic thriller drama film directed by Gregory Dark and starring Maxwell Caulfield, Shannon Whirry, Jan-Michael Vincent and David Carradine. This film spawned two sequels: Animal Instincts 2 (1994) (also with Whirry) and Animal Instincts 3 (also known as Animal Instincts: The Seductress).

== Synopsis ==
Joanna (Whirry) is married to David Cole (Caulfield), a police officer. While they love each other, their marriage is in a precarious position, as David's sexual impotence prevents them from being intimate with each other. A sexually frustrated Joanna ends up having an extramarital affair with a cable repairman; when they are caught in the act by David, David's response is to passionately have sex with Joanna, to Joanna's surprise. Joanna concludes that he "likes to watch", so they begin engaging in voyeurism: Joanna begins multiple affairs with several other men in her and David's home, which David videotapes with a hidden camera to later watch. Problems arise, however, when the local mob learns about their sexual activities, and their leader (Carradine) blackmails them into videotaping an encounter with a crooked politician (Vincent).

== Cast ==
- Shannon Whirry as Joanna
- Maxwell Caulfield as David
- David Carradine as William
- Jan-Michael Vincent as Fletcher Ross
- Mitch Gaylord as Rod Tennison
- John Saxon as Otto Van Horne
- Delia Sheppard as Ingrid
- Tom Reilly as Kena
- Wendy Walsh as Interviewer

== Release and reception ==
Animal Instincts was rated R in the United States for explicit sexual material and profanity. Similar ratings were bestowed on the film in Australia under the Office of Film and Literature Classification Rating Board (for "high level sexual material") and the British Board of Film Classification (BBFC) Rating System Network.

Animal Instincts was given mixed to substandard reviews by audience and film critics. Under Rotten Tomatoes, the audience gave the film only a 14% rating. Radio Times magazine gave two out of five stars to the film, describing it as "the thriller that made Shannon Whirry a favourite of the top-shelf brigade", and calling it Emmanuelle of the 1990s.
