= The Escort (1997 film) =

- Directed by: Gary Graver
- Starring: Shauna O'Brien
- Release date: 1997
- Country: USA
- Language: English

The Escort is a 1997 American erotic thriller film.

== The Escort II ==
The Escort
- Directed by: Gary Graver
- Release date: 1998
- Country: USA
- Language: English

The film was followed by a sequel in 1998.

== The Escort III ==
The Escort III
- Directed by: Jim Wynorski
- Release date: 1999
- Country: USA
- Language: English

There was another sequel in 1999.
