= Nina K. Martin =

Nina K. Martin is an associate professor of film studies at Connecticut College and the author of Sexy Thrills: Undressing the Erotic Thriller.

== Education ==
Martin received her B.S. at Ithaca College, her M.A. at New York University, and her Ph.D. at Northwestern University, in the Women's Studies Certificate Program of the Department of Radio-Television-Film.
