= Private Obsession =

- Directed by: Lee Frost
- Written by: Lee Frost
- Starring: Shannon Whirry; Michael Christian; Bo Svenson
- Distributed by: Multicom Entertainment Group
- Release date: 1995
- Country: United States
- Language: English

Private Obsession is a 1995 American erotic thriller film written and directed by Lee Frost and starring Shannon Whirry, Michael Christian, and Bo Svenson.

== Summary ==
Emanuelle, a world famous fashion model, is held captive by Richard Tate, a crazed fan. Richard wants her for himself but Emanuelle is determined to escape.
