= Martin Hewitt (actor) =

American businessman and former actor (born 1958)

- Born: February 19, 1958 (age 68); San Jose, California, U.S.
- Education: Claremont High School, American Academy of Dramatic Arts
- Occupation: Actor
- Years active: 1979–2003
- Height: 6 ft 0 in (183 cm)
- Spouse: Kerstin Gneiting (m. 1990; div. 2015)
- Children: 2

Martin Hewitt (born February 19, 1958) is an American businessman and former actor. He is best known for his film debut as David Axelrod in Franco Zeffirelli's Endless Love (1981). His last role was a 2003 episode of ER.

== Early life and education ==
Martin Hewitt was born on February 19, 1958, in San Jose, California. He is the second oldest of six children to Peter and Heather Hewitt. Peter Hewitt is a retired owner of a medical-equipment manufacturing firm. Hewitt's early years were spent in California, England, Belgium and Michigan.

Hewitt attended Claremont High School. Hewitt first acted at age 14 in a school production of The King and I. He studied business at a community college before switching to theater. After receiving an AA degree in Theater Arts, Hewitt studied at the American Academy of Dramatic Arts, in Pasadena, California.

== Career ==
=== Endless Love ===
While enrolled at the American Academy of Dramatic Arts in Pasadena, California and working as bartender and valet car park/parking lot attendant, Hewitt saw an ad for an open call for a film directed by Franco Zeffirelli and beat out 5,000 actors, including Tom Cruise and Timothy Hutton, for the male lead. Hewitt had originally envisioned a Shakespearean career, but suddenly he was appearing opposite Brooke Shields in Franco Zeffirelli's Endless Love, a 1981 forbidden teen romance film. According to Hewitt, "Some people actually wrote that I was discovered in a parking lot."

"Of course, my head swelled up like crazy," he says. "Franco, who is very paternal, fed my ego so that I would be very confident." Hewitt spoke highly of his co-star, Brooke Shields. "She treated me like a friend," he says. During filming in New York City, she invited Hewitt to spend the weekend at her house in New Jersey, where they played board games.

Hewitt garnered mostly neutral reviews for his portrayal of David Axelrod. Variety commented that "Since he's center stage most of the time, it's fortunate that newcomer Martin Hewitt registers so strongly. Zeffirelli has dressed and photographed his find almost in the style of some of his mentor Luchino Visconti's neo-realist heroes, with two-day beard growths and anachronistic Clark Gable undershirts." Janet Maslin of The New York Times wrote that Hewitt "has neither the resources nor the opportunity to convey much about how David's mind works, even though this is what the story hinges on." Nevertheless, Hewitt said, "I don't care what anyone says; I am proud of that film."

=== Later acting career ===
"I started at the top. My first professional acting role was in a starring role in a Universal Studios film," he said. "I didn't even get the chance to get my feet wet. So after that film, it was sort of a downward path."

After appearing in his second film, Yellowbeard (1983), in which he portrayed the son of Graham Chapman's character, Hewitt spent the 1980s appearing in forgettable B movies and doing the occasional TV guest spot. Of the films he appeared in during the '80s included: April Fool, later to be titled Killer Party (1986), The Falling (1986) and Two Moon Junction (1988). In the latter film, he portrayed Chad, the fiancé of Sherilyn Fenn's character. Hewitt previously worked with Fenn in Out Of Control (1985). Hewitt had also done straight-to-video productions including Crime Lords (1991), Carnal Crimes (1991) and Night Rhythms (1992). He retired from acting in 2003.

"I was kind of surprised that I didn't hear his name much after that," said Yellowbeard director Melvin Damski. "He was a talented kid."

=== Life after acting ===
Branching out into home inspection to help pay the bills, he opened his own company in 1993. "Any time my agent would call and say, 'We want you to read for this,'" he says, "I'd go, 'Man, I've got an inspection.'" As of 2015, Hewitt still owns his home inspection service in San Luis Obispo, California.

"I really don't miss it," he says of his brief Hollywood heyday. "I've got my own company. I live in a great area. I have great kids. I surf every other day. I've got it all as far as I'm concerned." Still, he has not quite shaken the acting bug. According to People, Hewitt learned of an industry ad asking if anyone knew where he was. Some filmmakers, it turned out, thought he would be perfect for a lead role in a movie about drugged-out gay prostitutes in West Hollywood. "It wasn't for me", he says with a laugh. "I politely declined."

== Personal life ==
Hewitt has confirmed that he and Brooke Shields were never romantically involved, stating that they "became good friends, but we're not close." Shields later vouched for this in her 2014 memoir, There Was a Little Girl: The Real Story of My Mother and Me. "Martin and I got along well and enjoyed working with one another. We neither fell in love nor hated each other...All we were required to do was convince people we were in love. This approach freed us both up to become actual friends."

While Hewitt was filming Crime Lords in South Africa in 1989, he met German-born flight attendant Kerstin Gneiting, whom he married in 1990. They divorced in 2015. Their two children are daughter Guinevere and son Cailean.

As of 2000, Hewitt resides in Morro Bay, California.

== Selected filmography ==
- Endless Love (1981)
- Yellowbeard (1983)
- Out of Control (1985)
- Killer Party (1986)
- The Falling (1986)
- Two Moon Junction (1988)
- Night Rhythms (1992)
- Secret Games (1992)
- Secret Games 2: The Escort (1993)
- Ground Zero (2000)
