= Gregory Dark =

American filmmaker

- Born: Gregory Hippolyte Brown; Los Angeles, California, U.S.
- Other names: Alexander Hippolyte; Gregory Brown; Gregory Dark; Gregory Hippolyte; The Dark Brothers
- Occupations: Film director; producer; writer

Gregory Dark is an American film director, film producer, music video director, and screenwriter. Dark is an adult filmmaker who transitioned into directing Hollywood films.

== Early career ==
Dark began his career as a fine artist of both paintings and conceptual art and installations. After graduating with a Master of Fine Arts degree from Stanford University, he moved to New York City to pursue graduate studies in film at New York University.

From the mid-1980s through the mid-1990s, Dark directed hardcore and rated R films. His work from this period helped create the current "alt porn" genre as well as invent the noir-romance genre of the erotic thriller. Sight & Sound, the journal of the British Film Institute, considered Dark's erotic thrillers groundbreaking films of the genre. In the 1980s, Dark, along with Richard Lerner and Wendy Apple, directed and produced Fallen Angels, the seminal documentary about the early Los Angeles porn scene.

Dark directed or produced more than 30 action films and erotic thrillers as head of production for Axis Films, a B movie company, from 1987 to 1995. Dark's erotic thrillers in the early 1990s such as Animal Instincts and its sequel Animal Instincts II, Body of Influence, and Mirror Images 2 that featured Shannon Whirry in various stages of undress. In 1994, he directed the film Stranger by Night starring Steven Bauer.

Dark's films of this period won him accolades such as "the Steven Spielberg of the soft-core set" and "the Martin Scorsese of the erotic thriller".

== Music videos ==
In 1996, Dark directed the music video for "Bar-X-The Rocking M" by the Melvins. In 1998, he directed the video for "Zoot Suit Riot" by Cherry Poppin' Daddies, which won the Daddies a nomination for "Best New Artist in a Video" at the 1998 MTV Video Music Awards. That same year, he directed "Fuck Dying" and "Pushin' Weight" for Ice Cube. Dark's 1998 video "What U See Is What U Get" for Xzibit remained at the top of the Charts on BET for almost a year and won a Source Award. In 1999, he directed the video for "From the Bottom of My Broken Heart" by Britney Spears. In 2000, Vitamin C's "Graduation (Friends Forever)" and Linkin Park's "One Step Closer" video, were shot in Los Angeles, sixty-three feet underground in an abandoned subway tunnel. In 2002, he directed the video for the A*Teens cover of "Can't Help Falling in Love" for the Disney feature Lilo & Stitch.

Dark directed the music video for "Undercover Funk" by Snoop Dogg featuring Bootsy Collins for the film Undercover Brother. The video featured acting performances by the film's stars Eddie Griffin, who morphs into Snoop Dogg at the beginning of the video, and dancing and lip-synching performances by Neil Patrick Harris and Denise Richards.

== Major motion pictures ==
Dark's first major motion picture, the horror film See No Evil, was released nationwide on May 19, 2006, for WWE Films and Lions Gate Entertainment. It was directed by Dark, written by Dan Madigan, produced by Joel Simon, and starred professional wrestler Kane. See No Evil grossed almost $19 million worldwide theatrical with a budget of $8 million The film grossed over $45 million on DVD sales and rentals.

In 2008, Dark directed the independent film Little Fish, Strange Pond, which was seen at a number of film festivals. The film starred Matthew Modine, Adam Baldwin, Callum Blue, Zach Galifianakis, Liza Weil, and Paul Adelstein and was retitled Frenemy for its December 2010 Lions Gate Entertainment DVD release. During 2009, Dark directed An Evening With Stephen Lynch, a concert film starring comedian and musician Stephen Lynch.

== Selected filmography ==
As director – Film

- Mirror Images (1992) (as A. Gregory Hippolyte)
- Secret Games (1992) (as Gregory Hippolyte)
- Night Rhythms (1992) (as A. Gregory Hippolyte)
- Animal Instincts (1992) (as A. Gregory Hippolyte)
- Body of Influence (1993) (as Gregory Hippolyte)
- Sins of the Night (1993) (as Gregory Hippolyte)
- Secret Games 2: The Escort (1993) (as Gregory Hippolyte)
- Mirror Images 2 (1993)
- Object of Obsession (1994) (as Gregory H. Brown)
- Animal Instincts 2 (1994) (as Gregory Hippolyte)
- Secret Games 3 (1994) (as Gregory Hippolyte)
- Stranger by Night (1994) (as Gregory H. Brown)
- Animal Instincts 3 (1996) (as Gregory Hippolyte)
- See No Evil (2006)
- Little Fish, Strange Pond (2009)

== Awards ==
- 1996 XRCO Awards – Best Director
- 1996 XRCO Hall of Fame inductee

== Notes ==
- Petkovich, Anthony (1997). "Gregory Hippolyte aka Brown/Dark". Psychotronic Video. No. 26. p. 75.
