= Ashley Irwin =

Film score composer from Australia

- Born: Ashley John Irwin
- Genres: Soundtrack (Film score); Contemporary classical
- Occupation(s): Composer, arranger, orchestrator, conductor
- Website: http://www.ashleyirwin.com/

Ashley Irwin is an Australian born composer, conductor, orchestrator, arranger and music producer. Irwin has composed, conducted, arranged, and orchestrated music for numerous movie soundtracks. He has collaborated with Clint Eastwood, Bill Conti, and has scored for silent films including Alfred Hitchcock's The Lodger: A Story of the London Fog. He has an Emmy award for Outstanding Individual Achievement in Music Direction, and two Emmy nominations.

Irwin is currently serving his sixth two-year term as the president of the Society of Composers and Lyricists.

== Career ==
Ashley Irwin began his career arranging for records and commercials in Australia. He was one of six arrangers commissioned to orchestrate the ill-fated 1988 Australian bicentennial musical, Manning Clark's History of Australia – The Musical. After writing music for theatre, records, advertising and television, Irwin moved to the United States in 1990, composing and orchestrating for feature films.

In the late 90s, Irwin scored the silent classics The White Hell of Piz Palü directed by German director Arnold Fanck, and Alfred Hitchcock's The Lodger: A Story of the London Fog.

Irwin was recommended to Clint Eastwood after his arranger retired, which led to Irwin's collaboration with Eastwood on films Hereafter, J. Edgar, Jersey Boys, and The 15:17 to Paris. He also worked on independent films including The Pardon starring John Hawkes and Jaime King. Irwin was one of the writers for the 2011 Australian musical "Pyjamas in Paradise''.

Irwin has arranged and composed for 21 Academy Awards shows, several Emmy, Grammy, and other TV variety shows. His credits as music director include NBC's Screen Actors Guild Awards, American Giving Awards, and the Screen Musical Awards.

=== Society of Composer and Lyricists ===
Ashley Irwin has served as the president of the Society of Composers and Lyricists since 2013.

Irwin has moderated numerous interviews, among them are six-time Oscar nominee Alexandre Desplat, Christophe Beck, Bruce Broughton, and Randy Edelman. He is a frequent speaker and presenter at SCL hosted events and award shows.

=== APRA ===
Irwin is an official APRA Ambassador. He was the music director for APRA's Screen Music Awards between 2013 and 2016.

== Recognition ==
Ashley Irwin was awarded an Emmy in 1992 for Outstanding Individual Achievement in Music Direction for the 64th annual Academy Awards. He has previously been nominated for Outstanding Achievement in Music Direction in 1990 and 1991.

The Australian Guild of Screen Composers recognized Irwin for his score to The White Hell of Piz Palü and The Lodger: A Story of the London Fog, awarding him the Best Feature Film Score in both 1998 and 1999.

Irwin was given a G.A.N.G. award for his work in The Godfather video game in 2006.

He was nominated for AACTA and APRA awards for his recreated songs in the mini-series Peter Allen: Not the Boy Next Door.
