= James Avalon =

American adult film director

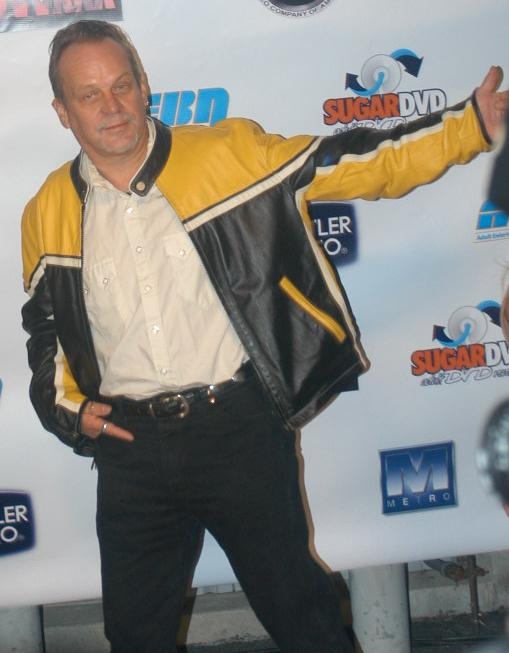
- Avalon in 2005
- Other names: Kunga Sludge, Mondo Tundra, Monty Tundra
- Occupations: Adult film director; cinematographer; editor; writer; producer
- Years active: 1979–
- Notable work: A Little Part Of Me, Fantasy Ltd, Les Vampyres

James Avalon is an American adult film director, cinematographer, editor, writer, and producer. His aliases include Kunga Sludge, Mondo Tundra and Monty Tundra.

== Career ==
James entered the adult film industry in 1979 as a journalist and became editor of Adam Film World’s special editions. He was also a founding member of the X-Rated Critics Organization.

== Awards (selected) ==
- 1998 AVN Award Winner – Best Editor, Video (Zazel)
- 2001 AVN Award Winner - Best Director, Film (Les Vampyres)
- 2002 AVN Award nomination - Best Director, Video (Taboo 2001)
- 2003 AVN Award nomination - Best Director, Film (Les Vampyres 2)
- 2004 AVN Award nomination - Best Director, Non-Feature (Fantasy)
- 2004 XRCO Hall of Fame Inductee
- 2005 AVN Hall of Fame Inductee
- 2006 Ninfa Prize Winner – Best Director (La Mansión del Placer)
- 2007 AVN Award nomination - Best Director, Video (Sex Pix)
- 2009 AVN Award nominations - Best Director, Feature, Best Videography & Best Screenplay (Roller Dollz)
- 2011 Feminist Porn Award Winner – Steamiest Romantic Movie (A Little Part of Me)
- 2013 XBIZ Award nominations - Director of the Year (Tango to Romance) & Director of the Year – Body of Work

== Filmography (selected) ==
- A Little Part Of Me (2011)
- Fantasy Ltd (2002)
- Les Vampyres (2000)
- Les Vampyres 2 (2003)
- Roller Dolz (2008)
- Sex Pix (2005)
- Taboo 2001 (2001)
- White Angel (1998)
- Zazel (1997)
