= Black Scorpion =

Black Scorpion may refer to:

- Scorpion, an animal of the order Scorpiones within the class Arachnida

== Films and TV ==
- The Black Scorpion (film), a 1957 film about giant scorpions, with special effects by Willis O'Brien
- Black Scorpion (film), a 1995 film produced by Roger Corman and starring Joan Severance
- Black Scorpion II: Aftershock, a 1997 sequel to Black Scorpion that also starred Joan Severance
- Black Scorpion (TV series), a 2001 TV series based on the Black Scorpion movies, starring Michelle Lintel

== Video games ==
- Black Scorpion, an armored supervillain from the video game City of Heroes

== People ==
- Benjamin Adekunle (1936–2014), Nigerian Army officer nicknamed Black scorpion
- Black Scorpion (performer) (born 1979), freak show/sideshow performer from Austin, TX

== Sport ==
- The Black Scorpion (professional wrestling), a professional wrestling gimmick
