= Craig J. Nevius =

American playwright, screenwriter and film producer

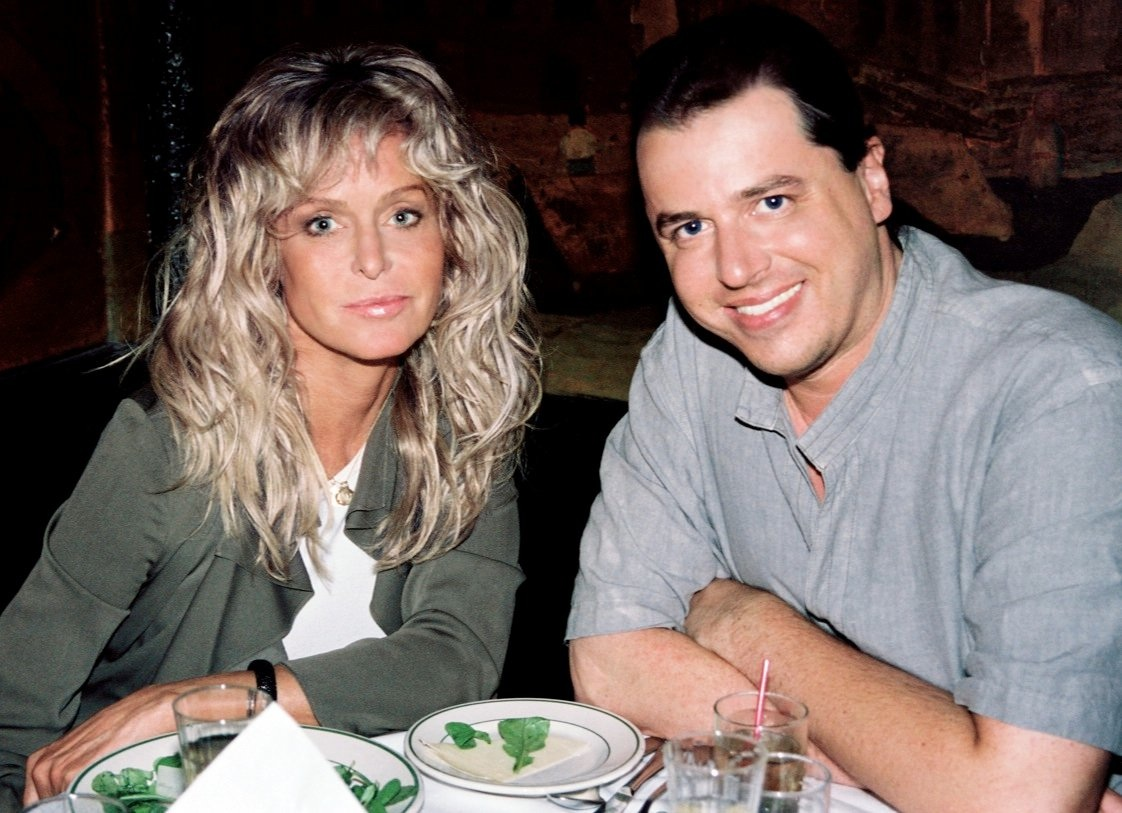
Craig Nevius with Farrah Fawcett

Craig J. Nevius is an American playwright, screenwriter and film producer. He is the owner of Windmill Entertainment LLC, a television development and production company that specializes in both scripted and unscripted projects with pop culture appeal.

== Career ==
=== Playwrighting ===
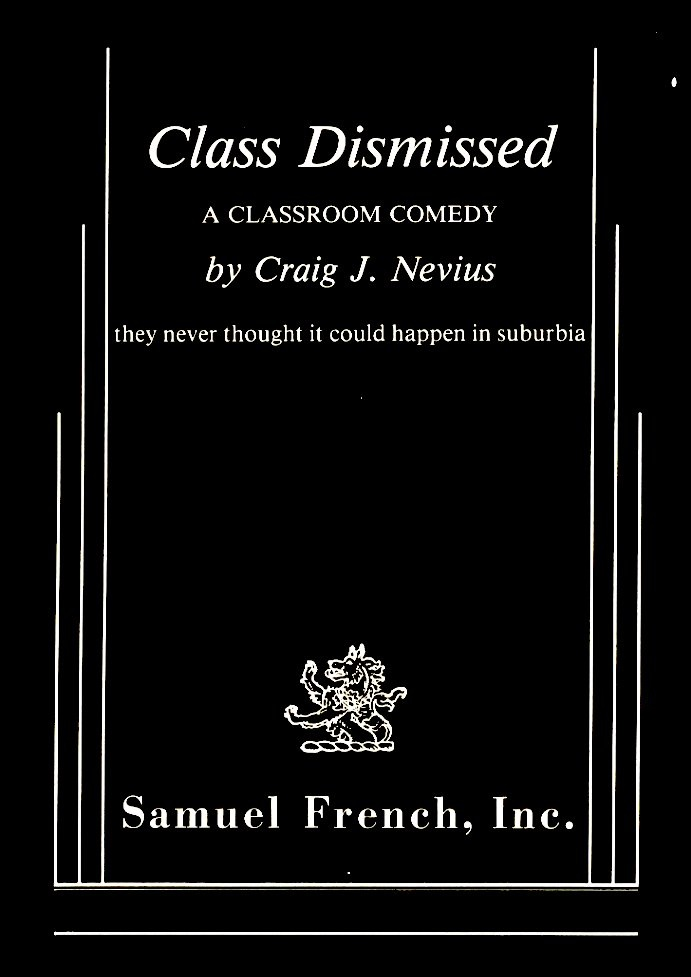
Class Dismissed

Born in Chicago, Nevius began his professional writing career at 17 while attending William Fremd High School in Palatine, Illinois. While a student there, he wrote Class Dismissed, a play about an idealistic but exasperated English teacher who holds his five toughest students hostage in a classroom to teach them a special lesson about life. The play was published by Samuel French, Inc., making Nevius the youngest published playwright in history. Nevius subsequently authored two other plays: The Men's Room and Where the Heart Is, both of which were originally produced by Chicago's Group Theater and directed by Nevius.

=== Screenwriting ===
After studying playwrighting and directing at Carnegie Mellon University, Nevius moved to Hollywood to pursue film and television. He drew on his college and theater experience for his first screenplay, a romantic comedy called Happy Together which won the Columbia Pictures FOCUS Award and was produced by Apollo Pictures. The film starred Patrick Dempsey as an introverted playwright who is mistakenly assigned to the same dorm room as an extroverted actress played by Helen Slater. Happy Together is notable for featuring Brad Pitt (pre-Thelma & Louise) in his first film role. Pitt was cast by Nevius when the producer and director could not decide between Pitt and another unknown actor.

==== Roger Corman ====
After Happy Together, Nevius began working with the noted low-budget producer and director Roger Corman. While working for Corman, Nevius also began a second career as a producer. He wrote and produced in several genres ranging from suspense thriller (Ladykiller (1996) starring Ben Gazzara and Death's Door starring David Carradine) to family comedy (Stepmonster (1993) starring Alan Thicke and A Very Unlucky Leprechaun (1998) starring Warwick Davis) to Gothic horror (Hellfire (1995) starring Ben Cross and Marquis De Sade (1996) starring Nick Mancuso). Most were typical low-budget Corman exploitation films.

His most notable collaboration with Corman was The Fantastic Four (1994), the original film version of Marvel Comics' popular comic series of the same name. A longtime fan of superheroes, Nevius seized the chance to work on the film. Unfortunately, none of the production team knew that the film was ordered for legal reasons with no intent to ever distribute it. The owner of the film rights, Constantin Film, was about to lose its option on the property and the only way it could retain the rights was to make the movie—even if it would never be released. The film eventually found an audience as a bootleg through internet sales and at comic book conventions. Clint Morris of Film Threat magazine said, "[Y]es it's terribly low-budget and yes it's derisorily campy and feebly performed, but at the same time there's also something inquiringly irresistible about this B comic tale that makes you wonder why it didn't get a release somewhere along the line."

According to a Nevius interview with "The Sequential Tart", The Fantastic Four project was important in that it paved the way for Black Scorpion, written by Nevius and produced by Corman and originally aired on Showtime. Its sequel, Black Scorpion 2: AfterShock also starred Joan Severance in the title role, was both written and produced by Nevius. David Bianculli, television critic of the New York Daily News, called the series "an imaginative mini-franchise".

The mini-franchise moved from Showtime to the Syfy with 22 one-hour episodes of Black Scorpion. Joan Severance was replaced by Michelle Lintel. The series also featured Adam West, television's original Batman, as Black Scorpion's asthmatic arch-enemy, The Breathtaker. Nevius also wrote the part of Clockwise, another supervillain, for Frank Gorshin (TV's "Riddler") to play. The series was notable for also casting several Playboy Playmates and models as "Bad Girls" including Victoria Silvstedt and Julie McCullough. The series won a Golden Apple Award for Excellence in the Filmed Depiction of Science Fiction & Fantasy.

=== Windmill Entertainment ===
In 2004, with Nancy Valen, Nevius started Windmill Entertainment which focuses on scripted and unscripted television projects with pop culture appeal.

Among the company's first productions was the reality series Chasing Farrah (starring Farrah Fawcett and Ryan O'Neal) which set record ratings for TV Land. David Bianculli, television critic of The New York Daily News, gave it three stars, writing, "In the genre called reality, it's a rarity."

Nevius and his company next turned to another television icon: William Shatner. The result of the collaboration was "Shatner in Concert", a hybrid of music and reality which intercut biographical songs written and performed by Shatner with scenes from his everyday life. The show included appearances by Leonard Nimoy, Candice Bergen and Patrick Stewart as well as musical performances by Ben Folds, Brad Paisley and Joe Jackson.

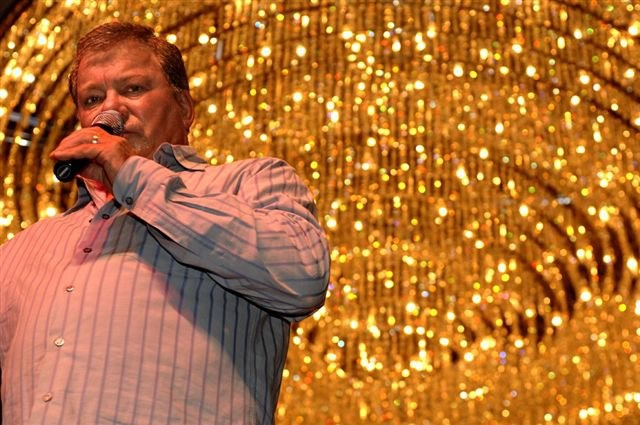
William Shatner

Among projects in development at Windmill Entertainment is the VH1-announced mini-series The Brat Pack which Nevius has described as "a pop culture period piece". The 1980s drama depicts the rise and fall of teen actors Molly Ringwald, Emilio Estevez, Anthony Michael Hall, Demi Moore, Judd Nelson and Rob Lowe, among others. Nevius also wrote Baywatch Babes for the network: a behind-the-scenes movie about the reality of being a fantasy for millions of men as told by the actresses who starred in the "most watched television series in the world."

Also in development is Action Heroes, Inc. for ABC and Fox TV Studios. The action-comedy is about three aging television heroes who are too old to play the parts that made them famous so they open a detective agency where they use their Hollywood knowledge of crimefighting on the real streets of Los Angeles with unexpected results. The project was developed with and for William Shatner, Lee Majors and Robert Wagner to star. Other projects with Shatner include the recently announced Christmas movie Las Vegas Santa with Shatner in the title role of a disgruntled St. Nicholas who relocates from the North Pole to Sin City. Nevius also worked with Shatner to adapt his best selling sci-fi novels into a comic book series with Bluewater Comics called "The Tek War Chronicles".

Nevius and his company produced Farrah's Story (a.k.a. A Wing and A Prayer). The documentary chronicled Farrah Fawcett's battle with cancer both in the United States and in Germany as well as her efforts to protect her privacy from the tabloids and paparazzi. The film gave NBC its best rating on a Friday night since the 2008 Summer Olympics and garnered Emmy nominations for both Fawcett and Nevius as executive producers in the category of Best Nonfiction Programming. The two-hour "video diary" was written by Fawcett and directed by Nevius.
