= Seven Sundays =

Seven Sundays may refer to:

- Seven Sundays (1994 film), a French-Italian comedy film
- Seven Sundays (2017 film), a Filipino comedy-drama film
