= Black Scorpion II =

1997 film

- DVD cover
- Genre: Superhero; Comedy
- Written by: Craig J. Nevius
- Directed by: Jonathan Winfrey
- Starring: Joan Severance; Whip Hubley; Garrett Morris; Laura Harring
- Music by: Kevin Kiner
- Country of origin: United States
- Original language: English

Production
- Executive producer: Lance H. Robbins
- Producer: Roger Corman
- Cinematography: Mark Kohl
- Editor: Louis F. Cioffi
- Running time: 85 minutes
- Production company: New Horizons Pictures

Original release
- Network: Showtime
- Release: May 13, 1997

Related
- Black Scorpion; Black Scorpion

Black Scorpion II: Aftershock, also known as Black Scorpion II: Ground Zero, is a 1997 American superhero comedy television film directed by Jonathan Winfrey, written by Craig J. Nevius, and produced by Roger Corman. It is the sequel to Black Scorpion (1995), and stars Joan Severance, reprising her role as the titular crime-fighting superhero. It aired on Showtime on May 13, 1997.

Darcy Walker is a police detective in Angel City, a fictionalized version of Los Angeles. Her secret identity is the Black Scorpion, a comic book style vigilante. The Black Scorpion does not have any super powers but, like Batman, she fights for justice using a combination of martial arts and advanced technology, including her high-tech car, the Scorpionmobile. The film's exaggerated characters and unrealistic events are portrayed with a humorous camp aesthetic.

The film was followed in 2001 by a Black Scorpion TV series that starred Michelle Lintel in the title role.

== Plot ==
Darcy Walker returns as the Black Scorpion while Angel City is in the midst of a crime wave. When a series of earthquakes shake up the major metropolitan area, seismologist Prof. Undershaft had pioneered groundbreaking technology made to prevent such disasters in the future. But the duplicitous and corrupt Mayor Worth had her life's work sabotaged in order to embezzle tremor insurance, and assigned blame for the fault device ruining the city on her. Now Black Scorpion must protect the city from the vindictive Undershaft, who has become the lethal supervillain femme fatale Aftershock.

== Cast ==
- Joan Severance as Darcy Walker / Black Scorpion
- Whip Hubley as Rick
- Garrett Morris as Argyle Simms
- Laura Harring as Babette
- Sherrie Rose as Professor Ursula Undershaft / Aftershock
- Stoney Jackson as Gangster Prankster
- Matt Roe as Mayor Artie Worth
- Stephen Lee as Captain Strickland
- Terri J. Vaughn as "Tender Lovin'"
- Steven Kravitz as "Slugger"
- Rick Rossovich as Construction Foreman
- Kenneth Londoner as John
