= Stoney Jackson =

American actor (born 1960)

- Born: Alwyn Jackson; February 27, 1960 (age 66); Richmond, Virginia, U.S.
- Occupation: Actor
- Years active: 1979–present
- Children: 3

Stonewall W. "Stoney" Jackson (born Alwyn Jackson; February 27, 1960) is an American actor. Jackson was born in Richmond, Virginia.

== Career ==
He was featured in numerous teen magazines in the 1970s and 1980s, including Right On, Teen Beat, and Tiger Beat. Jackson played a baseball player in the 1994 Disney film Angels in the Outfield. He portrayed high school basketball player Jesse Mitchell on the ensemble series The White Shadow, and Travis Fillmore on the sitcom 227. He played Black Jack Savage in the pilot episode of The 100 Lives of Black Jack Savage. He also has made guest appearances on shows like Hardcastle and McCormick and Everybody Hates Chris. He was also cast as "Kenyatta", an illiterate lowlife in the 1999 comedy film Trippin'.

Stoney Jackson was one of the more visible dancers in the iconic music video for Michael Jackson's "Beat It". He appeared in the video for Dan Hartman's "I Can Dream About You" as the lead vocalist of the fictional group "The Sorels" from the Walter Hill film Streets of Fire, in which he appeared. Hill would later cast Jackson again in Trespass and Wild Bill. In 1985, he co-starred in the short-lived crime series, "The Insiders," as James Mackey. In 1985 he appeared in the Season 11, Episode 14 of The Jeffersons. In 1997, he appeared with John Lafayette and Kyla Pratt in the Season 5, Episode 22 of Walker, Texas Ranger.

Jackson also appeared in the film CB4, with Chris Rock and Allen Payne, as Wacky Dee, a take-off on dance-oriented rappers like Freedom Williams and MC Hammer. He performed the song "Dance" in the film.

Jackson portrayed the supervillain The Gangster Prankster in Roger Corman's 1997 movie Black Scorpion II and reprises the role in the 2001 Black Scorpion.

Kool Keith's album Spankmaster (2001) features a track named "Stoney Jackson," and Strong Arm Steady's second album is titled In Search of Stoney Jackson (2010).

== Filmography ==
=== Film ===
Year	Title	Role	Notes
1979	The Return of Mod Squad	Student	TV movie
1979	The Concorde... Airport '79	American Olympic Athlete	
1979	Young Love, First Love	Student	TV movie
1979	Roller Boogie	"Phones"	
1984	Streets of Fire	Bird	
1986	Knights of the City	Eddie	
1987	Jocks	Andy	
1988	Mortuary Academy	James Dandridge	
1988	Police Story: Cop Killer	-	TV movie
1988	The Perfect Model	Stedman Austin	
1989	Baywatch: Panic at Malibu Pier	Lifeguard	TV movie
1990	The End of Innocence	Leroy	
1991	Up Against the Wall	Jesse Bradley	
1991	By the Sword	Johnson	
1992	Blind Vision	Tony Davis	
1992	Trespass	Wicked	
1993	CB4	Wacky Dee	
1994	Angels in the Outfield	Ray Mitchell	
1994	Red Sun Rising	Gamal	
1994	Angel 4: Undercover	Mojo Clark	
1994	Kangaroo Court	-	Short
1995	Wild Bill	Jubal Pickett	
1996	The Disappearance of Kevin Johnson	Julian	
1996	Lone Tiger	Furie	
1996	The Fan	Zamora	
1996	Carnival of Wolves	Johnny	
1997	Black Scorpion II	Gangster Prankster	
1997	Human Desires	Vic	Video
1999	Trippin'	Kenyatta	
1999	At Face Value	Militant Man	Short
2000	The Thief & the Stripper	U-Dog	
2003	Blackball	Courtney	
2019	Perfectly Single	Lee	

=== Television ===
Year	Title	Role	Notes
1980	Eight Is Enough	Darren	Recurring Cast: Season 4
1980	Stone	-	Episode: "The Partner"
1980	The Righteous Apples	James	Episode: "Point of View"
1980-81	The White Shadow	Jesse B. Mitchell	Main Cast: Season 3
1982	M*A*S*H	Soldier	Episode: "Blood and Guts"
1983	The Mississippi	Lou	Episode: "Joey"
1983	Hardcastle and McCormick	Harold 'Death Ray' Thomas	Episode: "The Prince of Fat City"
1984	Trapper John, M.D.	Ricky	Episode: "It's About Time"
1984	Highway to Heaven	Mau Mau	Episode: "The Return of the Masked Rider"
1985	The Jeffersons	Monk	Episode: "Last Dance"
1985-86	The Insiders	James Mackey	Main Cast
1986-87	Santa Barbara	Paul Whitney	Regular Cast
1989	Dragnet	Jesse James Jones	Episode: "Automated Muggings"
1989-90	227	Travis Filmore	Main Cast: Season 5
1991	The 100 Lives of Black Jack Savage	Black Jack Savage	Episode: "Pilot"
1991	Adam-12	-	Episode: "No Mercy"
1993	Family Matters	Lee	Episode: "Tender Kisses"
1994	Tales from the Crypt	Aaron Scott	Episode: "The Pit"
1997	Walker, Texas Ranger	Zack Russell	Episode: "The Neighborhood"
1998	Mike Hammer, Private Eye	Lonnie Hathaway	Episode: "The Long Road to Nowhere"
1998	Beyond Belief: Fact or Fiction	Lawrence	Episode: "A Joyful Noise"
1998	The Hughleys	Ray Ray	Episode: "The Thanksgiving Episode"
2000	Charmed	P.D. Alan Sloan	Episode: "The Honeymoon's Over"
2001	Black Scorpion	Gangster Prankster	Recurring Cast
2006	Everybody Hates Chris	Mr. Jackson	Episode: "Everybody Hates Drew"
2010	Modern Family	Referee	Episode: "Benched"
2012	Psych	Fred Dozier	Episode: "True Grits"
2016-20	Sangre Negra	Cimmaron Squalley	Recurring Cast
2022	Sangre Negra...Black Blood	Cimmaron Squalley	Main Cast: Season 1

=== Music videos ===
Year	Song	Artist
1983	"Beat It"	Michael Jackson
1984	"I Can Dream About You" (version 1)"	Dan Hartman
1984	"Change Your Wicked Ways"	Penny Ford
