= Black Scorpion (film) =

1995 television film

- DVD cover
- Genre: Superhero comedy
- Written by: Craig J. Nevius
- Directed by: Jonathan Winfrey
- Starring: Joan Severance; Bruce Abbott; Garrett Morris
- Music by: Kevin Kiner
- Country of origin: United States
- Original language: English

Production
- Executive producers: Roger Corman; Lance H. Robbins
- Producer: Mike Elliott
- Cinematography: Geoff George
- Editors: Tom Petersen; Gwyneth Gibby
- Running time: 90 minutes
- Production company: New Horizons

Original release
- Network: Showtime
- Release: August 22, 1995

Related
- Black Scorpion

Black Scorpion is a 1995 American superhero comedy television film directed by Jonathan Winfrey, written by Craig J. Nevius, and starring Joan Severance as the eponymous costumed crime fighter. Roger Corman was the executive producer, and it was originally released on the Showtime cable network on August 22, 1995 as part of the Roger Corman Presents series.

The film concerns the comic book-style adventures of Darcy Walker, a police detective whose secret identity is the Black Scorpion, a superhero vigilante for justice. Like Batman, she fights evildoers with a combination of martial arts, great agility and strength, and many technological devices, including a high-powered, specially equipped car. Also like the Batman TV series of the 1960s, Black Scorpion is a work of camp, using deliberately exaggerated and unrealistic characters and events to comic effect.

Black Scorpion was followed by a 1997 sequel, Black Scorpion II. In 2001, the Sci-Fi Channel aired a Black Scorpion TV series that starred Michelle Lintel in the title role.

Black Scorpion was turned into a comic-book series, published digitally by Devil's Due Publishing. There was also a one-off Isis / Black Scorpion comic published by Bluewater Productions.

== Premise ==
Darcy Walker, a police detective, becomes the Black Scorpion, a costumed crime fighter, after her father is murdered. She does not reveal her secret identity to her partner Michael Russo. She is aided by Argyle, a technology expert and former car thief.

While the movie doesn't explicitly spell out whether she has any special powers or not, it is shown in multiple scenes, through use of an electrical charge, that she is being enhanced by the scorpion ring she wears, a gift from her late father.

== Cast ==
- Joan Severance as Darcy Walker / Black Scorpion
- Bruce Abbott as Michael Russo
- Garrett Morris as Argyle Simms
- Rick Rossovich as Stan Walker
- Stephen Lee as Captain Strickland
- Terri J. Vaughn as "Tender Lovin'"
- Michael Wiseman as "Hacksaw"
- Brad Tatum as "Razor"
- Steven Kravitz as "Slugger"
- Darryl M. Bell as "E-Z Street"
- Casey Siemaszko as Dr. Noah Goddard
- John Sanderford as Aldridge
- Matt Roe as Mayor Artie Worth
- Shane Powers as Specs, Cop #2

== Production ==
The film was based on an original idea by Corman, which he developed with writer Craig J. Nevius. "I wanted to do a female Superman-Spiderman-Batman," said Corman.

Roger Corman said he wanted an unknown to play the lead.

My demands were -- I felt -- not difficult in Hollywood. I wanted an actress who was beautiful and had a great figure. Because we economized on the amount of cloth we used in the costume... I wanted a tall actress. She does a lot of martial arts. I couldn't have a 5-foot-1 actress beating up all these big guys. So I wanted a tall, beautiful woman with a good figure, who was a good actress, but I wasn't looking for Meryl Streep, just a good actress. I figured this would be pretty easy in Hollywood. It turned out to be incredibly difficult. I've never seen so many beautiful bad actresses in my life.

== Critical reception ==
TV Guide said, "The heroine of this 1995 Roger Corman Presents Showtime movie – the direct-to-video goddess Joan Severance – wears a black bustier, spike-heel thigh-high boots, a mask, and practically nothing else. This could very well have been the entire pitch that got this movie made. If that is all you're looking for, then Black Scorpion more than delivers.... The mood of the film swerves from straight-forward police noir themes to cartoony superhero action. Given the hackneyed dialogue, and Severance's wooden delivery of it, the best thing about this film just might be its beautifully haunting theme music."

In DVD Talk, Scott Weinberg wrote, "Black Scorpion is a scrappy, silly, low-budget Batman Returns rip-off that freely admits that it's a scrappy, silly, rip-off. That alone doesn't make it a good expenditure of one's time, but it's nice to see a campy little schlock-fest that at least respects the movies it's stealing from.... For what it is, which is a downright ridiculous take on the super-hero schpiel, Black Scorpion is actually pretty entertaining. And for all its broad (and periodically inane) silliness, it's a B-flick that delivers what it promises, with a whole lotta Severance on the side."

In Cinema on the Rocks, Ziggy Berkeley said, "What's not a distraction, amazingly enough, is the script. As it turns out, it's not just the fact that Black Scorpion is a comic-book heroine movie that makes it easy to ignore the plot holes and improbabilities. It's also that the rest of the story is so solid. Lines like the above-noted science problem are actually self-aware; generally, the dialogue's great, even sharp. The humor/drama train is ridden with wonderful precision. The pace is perfect. Bottom line, Black Scorpion is fun. But it's not just fun; it's well-crafted fun. Pick it up. You won't be sorry."

In Cinema Crazed, Felix Vasquez wrote, "While no one will ever claim Black Scorpion is a masterpiece of contemporary action film-making, it sure is a lot of fun and has that fun at the charge of Joan Severance, who is leggy, busty, and absolutely enticing when dressed as her rogue character.... Black Scorpion is admittedly a cheesy and absolutely campy hero origin tale that takes advantage of the C grade special effects and acting from the cast and delivers a romp that is something quite satisfying to sit through and never goes too over the top."

== Sequel ==
- Black Scorpion II, also known as Black Scorpion II: Aftershock and Black Scorpion II: Ground Zero, was released in 1997.
- Black Scorpion (TV series) aired for one season in 2001
