= Lake Consequence =

1993 film directed by Rafael Eisenman

- DVD cover
- Genre: Drama; Romance
- Written by: Zalman King
- Directed by: Rafael Eisenman
- Starring: Joan Severance; Billy Zane; May Karasun
- Music by: George S. Clinton
- Country of origin: United States
- Original language: English

Production
- Executive producer: Zalman King
- Producer: Avram Kaplan
- Production location: Los Angeles County
- Cinematography: Harris Savides
- Editor: James Bedford
- Running time: 85 minutes
- Production company: Warner Bros.
- Budget: US$

Original release
- Release: January 1, 1993

Lake Consequence is a 1993 made for television erotic drama film, produced by Zalman King and starring Joan Severance. It was directed by Rafael Eisenman. The film's tagline was, "A man and two women".

== Plot ==
Irene (Joan Severance), a housewife becomes bored while her husband and son are away on a weekend fishing trip. She becomes attracted to Billy (Billy Zane), a man she met when he trimmed a tree in her neighborhood. She accidentally becomes trapped in his trailer and arrives at Lake Consequence hours later. Discovered by his bisexual girlfriend, Grace (May Karasun), and then Billy, they agree to drive her into town so she can catch a bus home. Chinese New Year celebrations are in full swing and she is seduced by Billy during the celebrations at a Chinese nightclub and bath house.

As Irene develops an erotic relationship with Billy, repressed images of her teenage experience return. Confronted by her own sexuality and her forgotten past, and jealous of Billy's attentions to Grace, Irene flees after starting a fire.

However Billy chases her and drives her home, where her husband and child have yet to return. Feeling grief and self-loathing, Irene hesitates to return to her family. Billy lectures her on her responsibilities as wife, helps her to dress and disappears before her family return that night.

== Cast ==
- Billy Zane as Billy
- Joan Severance as Irene
- May Karasun as Grace
- Whip Hubley as Jim
- Courtland Mead as Christopher

== Reception ==
A review in The Jerusalem Post criticized Lake Consequence for attempting to be "more emotionally astute" than a typical porn film, saying, "It wants, in short, to be sexy while it is being wise, and the result is a frustrating film that boasts little more than the absence of both attributes."
