= Payback (1995 film) =

1995 film by Anthony Hickox

- Directed by: Anthony Hickox
- Written by: Sam Bernard
- Produced by: Natan Zahavi; Sam Bernard
- Starring: C. Thomas Howell; Joan Severance
- Cinematography: Allison Gordon-Kohler
- Edited by: Anita Brandt-Burgoyne
- Music by: Anthony Marinelli
- Production company: Tapestry Films
- Distributed by: Trimark Pictures
- Release date: January 10, 1995
- Running time: 93 minutes
- Country: United States
- Language: English

Payback is a 1995 crime film directed by Anthony Hickox and written by Sam Bernard. It stars C. Thomas Howell and Joan Severance.

== Plot ==
Oscar Bonsetter tells a dying prisoner that he will take revenge on the sadistic guard who killed him. In exchange, Oscar is told of a stash of money. Oscar is eventually released from prison but when he goes to get his revenge, he gets sidetracked by the now blind guard and his beautiful wife, Rose. Rose hates her life, and when someone shows her some attention, she jumps at it eventually. The tension builds as Oscar becomes more and more attracted to Rose.

== Cast ==
- C. Thomas Howell as Oscar Bonsetter
- Joan Severance as Rose Gullerman
- Marshall Bell as Tom "Gully" Gullerman
- Richard Burgi as Al Keegan
- R. G. Armstrong as Mac
- David Anthony Higgins as Jim Koval
- Lisa Robin Kelly as Teenage Girl
