= Bobbi Boland =

Bobbi Boland is a play by Nancy Hasty which premiered Off-Broadway at the Arclight Theatre, running from March 1 to July 10, 2001. In 2003, an attempt was made to mount a Broadway production starring Farrah Fawcett. However, the show closed during previews.

== Plot ==
Set in 1967 in Crestview, Florida and centers around Bobbi. She runs the charm school and is a theater star. It is a quaint, small town, and is trying to keep at bay the Rock n' Roll which is becoming more and more present. It's where a measure of a man is how much he provides for his family, where sexuality is overlooked, charm schools are still present and the theater is important part of everyone's social life.

Twenty years earlier, Bobbi was Miss Florida, and from that she gained valid beliefs of the way ladies and gentlemen should act towards each other. Sam is her gay haberdasher neighbor and theatre director. Bobbi is married to her high school sweetheart, Roger, who was once a great football player. He currently works at an office and hates it, and would much rather be doing carpentry. He has become a Joe Shmoe, wearing the suit and tie, and doing the job to satisfy his wife's idea of a husband, complete with him climbing the corporate ladder and keeping an elegant and prosperous house.

The play opens with Bobbi and Roger prepping the house because the owner of his company, George McGowan, to entertain the possibility of a promotion for him. Bobbi then has one of her charm school students, Susan, be hostess and Bobbi nags Roger before the bell rings. When it does, they are shocked to see George has not brought his wife, but Kim, a new, leggy young blonde from New York.

The drama heightens because Roger does love his wife, even though he knows he is being pushed around. Bobbi sees Kim as a threat to her marriage, and Kim forms a bond with Susan. By the resolution of the play, Bobbi is alone.

== Production history ==
The 2001 Off-Broadway production was directed by Evan Bergman and produced by Laine Valentino, with sets by John Farrell, costumes by Jill Kliber, lighting by Steve Rust and sound design by Cynthia Tuohy. The stage manager was Jim Ring.

Nancy Hasty starred as Bobbi Boland, with Holiday Segal as Susan Johnson, Gregg Henry as Roger Boland, Byron Loyd as Sam White, David Little as George McGowan, and Tanya Clarke as Kim McGowan.
