= The Insiders (TV series) =

1985–1986 American TV series

- Created by: Bobby Roth
- Starring: Nicholas Campbell; Stoney Jackson; Gail Strickland
- Opening theme: "Just A Job To Do" performed by Genesis
- Country of origin: United States
- Original language: English
- No. of seasons: 1
- No. of episodes: 13

Production
- Running time: 60 minutes
- Production companies: Leonard Hill Films; Universal Television

Original release
- Network: ABC
- Release: September 25, 1985 – June 2, 1986

The Insiders is an American drama series that aired on ABC from September 25, 1985, until June 2, 1986, starring Nicholas Campbell, Stoney Jackson and Gail Strickland.

== Plot ==
From the same production company that brought us Miami Vice comes a slick, stylish new drama about undercover reporter, Nick Fox. Working for the nationally syndicated paper, Newspoint, few know Fox's real identity. Among those in his inner circle are, Mackey, a hustler, ex-con and Nick's main contact on the street, and Alice West, the paper's editor, know his true identity.

== Cast ==
- Nicholas Campbell as Nick Fox
- Stoney Jackson as James Mackey
- Gail Strickland as Alice West

== Episodes ==
| No. | Title | Directed by | Written by | Original release date |
|---|---|---|---|---|
| 1 | "Pilot" | Edward Zwick | Michael Ahnemann | September 25, 1985 |
| 2 | "Fashion Flame" | Michael Vejar | Alfonse Ruggiero | October 2, 1985 |
| 3 | "Lonely Hearts" | Bruce Seth Green | Michael Ahnemann | October 9, 1985 |
| 4 | "Cold Shot" | Mike Robe | Jim Belson and Nicholas Campbell | October 16, 1985 |
| 5 | "Another Fine Mess" | Stephen Gyllenhaal | Jack Laird and Bobby Roth | October 30, 1985 |
| 6 | "The Mentor" | Bruce Seth Green | Story by : David Braff and Michael Petryni; Teleplay by : David Braff | November 6, 1985 |
| 7 | "Gun Runners" | John Patterson | Story by : William Driskill; Teleplay by : William Driskill and Alfonse Ruggiero | November 13, 1985 |
| 8 | "Doctors Incorporated" | Stephen Gyllenhaal | David Braff | November 20, 1985 |
| 9 | "Carly" | Gary Grillo | Michael Ahnemann | December 4, 1985 |
| 10 | "High Iron" | John Patterson | Story by : Richard De Roy and Leonard Hill; Teleplay by : Richard De Roy | December 11, 1985 |
| 11 | "All This and the Old School Tie" | Bobby Roth | Jack Laird | December 18, 1985 |
| 12 | "Den of Thieves" | Bruce Seth Green | Story by : Alfonse Ruggiero and Douglas Steinberg; Teleplay by : Alfonse Ruggiero and David Braff | January 8, 1986 |
| 13 | "Close Shave" | James Sheldon | Lou Shaw | June 2, 1986 |

== Notes ==
The one season program aired on Wednesday nights on ABC in the fall of 1985. It was directed by Bobby Roth, now known for the series Prison Break. It is also known for its popular theme song "Just A Job To Do" by Genesis. Stoney Jackson, who portrayed "Mackey," showed up in dozens of television series as a guest star and is also credited as one of the lead dancers in Michael Jackson's video "Beat It". The series was burned off with an additional new episode and repeats in June 1986.

Many have compared this series to another, NBC's Miami Vice, from the same production company. While much of the style and content of the two series is similar, the ratings success of the two are worlds apart.

This show follows the smash hit success of Miami Vice, which it greatly resembled in style and content, and came from the same production company.

== Ratings ==
Note: The "Rating" is not the 18-49 demo but the total rating.

Viewership and ratings per episode of The Insiders
| No. | Title | Air date | Timeslot (ET) | Rating (18–49) | Viewers (millions) |
|---|---|---|---|---|---|
| 1 | "Pilot" | September 25, 1985 | Wednesday 8:00 p.m. | 14.9 (#37 of 64) | 12.8 |
| 2 | "Fashion Flame" | October 2, 1985 | Wednesday 8:00 p.m. | 11.1 (#58 of 69) | 9.5 |
| 3 | "Lonely Hearts" | October 9, 1985 | Wednesday 8:00 p.m. | 15.0 (#35 of 63) | 12.9 |
| 4 | "Cold Shot" | October 16, 1985 | Wednesday 8:00 p.m. | 14.2 (#47 of 67) | 12.2 |
| 5 | "Another Fine Mess" | October 30, 1985 | Wednesday 8:00 p.m. | 12.3 (#60 of 67) | 10.5 |
| 6 | "The Mentor" | November 6, 1985 | Wednesday 8:00 p.m. | 15.2 (#38 of 68) | 13.0 |
| 7 | "Gun Runners" | November 13, 1985 | Wednesday 8:00 p.m. | 15.5 (#39 of 68) | 13.3 |
| 8 | "Doctors Incorporated" | November 20, 1985 | Wednesday 8:00 p.m. | 13.5 (#43 of 61) | 11.6 |
| 9 | "Carly" | December 4, 1985 | Wednesday 8:00 p.m. | 9.2 (#67 of 72) | 7.9 |
| 10 | "High Iron" | December 11, 1985 | Wednesday 8:00 p.m. | 11.4 (#60 of 71) | 9.8 |
| 11 | "All This and the Old School Tie" | December 18, 1985 | Wednesday 8:00 p.m. | 11.6 (#60 of 66) | 9.9 |
| 12 | "Den of Thieves" | January 8, 1986 | Wednesday 8:00 p.m. | 12.5 (#59 of 69) | 10.8 |
| 13 | "Close Shave" | June 2, 1986 | Monday 8:00 p.m. | 9.2 (#53 of 66) | 7.9 |

Source: A.C. Nielsen Company via Los Angeles Times
