= Black Scorpion (TV series) =

American superhero television series

- Genre: Superhero
- Created by: Roger Corman; Craig J. Nevius
- Starring: Michelle Lintel; Scott Valentine; BT (Brandon Terrell); Enya Flack
- Music by: David G. Russell
- Country of origin: United States
- Original language: English
- No. of seasons: 1
- No. of episodes: 22

Production
- Executive producers: Roger Corman; Cheryl Parnell
- Producer: Marta M. Mobley
- Production company: Concorde

Original release
- Network: Sci Fi
- Release: January 5 – June 30, 2001

Black Scorpion is an American superhero television series that aired on the Sci-Fi Channel in 2001. It aired in Canada on Space. The series is based on two Roger Corman Showtime TV-movies: Black Scorpion (1995) and its sequel Black Scorpion II: Aftershock (1997). The show focuses on a female police officer, who by night takes to the streets and fights crime as the superhero the Black Scorpion.

Some episodes from the series were combined into straight-to-video movies, with episodes 1.1 and 1.2 released as Black Scorpion Returns in 2001 and episodes 1.1, 1.3, and 1.8 released as Sting of the Black Scorpion in 2002.

The series was available on DVD in North America.

== Lead character ==
=== Darcy Walker ===
The Black Scorpion's real name is Darcy Walker, a police detective in Angel City (a fictionalized version of Los Angeles) who enforces the law more efficiently without a badge as her vigilante alter ego. Darcy's father was shot by the city's crooked district attorney. The D.A. was arrested, but the charges were suspiciously dropped. That was when Darcy decided to take to the streets as the Black Scorpion.

She is fond of the color black, revealed during an interview after her first appearance in costume. As shown in the first episode, her choice of scorpion imagery relates to an old fable about a scorpion trying to cross a river, which her father had told to her.

In the Corman films, the role of Darcy was played by brunette Joan Severance. In the series, she is played by redhead Michelle Lintel.

=== Black Scorpion ===
Apart from being an excellent hand-to-hand fighter and an expert with computers, Black Scorpion, just like Batman, has no superpowers. She relies on various specially developed technologies, chief among them the car called the Stingray with voice command weaponry and a disguise capability to make it look like a regular Corvette. The "Scorpionmobile" in the first episode was the movie version, which was destroyed and a new version was created for the run of the series. Only one exists in the world, which is owned by Nate Truman of StarCarCentral.com. She also wears a ring that shoots powerful blasts of energy and possesses a similar transformation capability to the Stingray for when Darcy needs to switch into her heroine costume in the field, like the Flash does in costume only from his lightning bolt Flash ring.

== Other major characters ==
- Detective Steve Rafferty is Darcy's partner and love interest. Apart from Darcy, Steve is the best cop on the force. At present, he is on a mission to unmask the Black Scorpion. Darcy wants to tell Steve that she is the Black Scorpion, but whenever she tries, the opportunity slips away. Steve may also have a crush on the Black Scorpion, which visibly upsets Darcy, forming a bizarre love triangle between Steve, herself, and her costumed alter ego. He is played by Scott Valentine. Of special note, Scott Valentine played a cameo in the second Black Scorpion film as minor thug.
- Specs and Slugger: A pair of incompetent cops, they work with Darcy and Steve. Often, the two get into car crashes while chasing Black Scorpion. They are played by Shane Powers and Steven Kravitz, respectively. Of note, they are the only characters, save Gangster Prankster and Aftershock, to return for the series with their original actors.
- Argyle Sims: Darcy's personal mechanic, he is the only person whom Darcy allowed to know her identity unconditionally, since he freely gave her most of her more hi-tech equipment. He is somewhat a mentor figure and comic relief to her at times, but his role is watered down somewhat in the series, only seeming to appear when a new gadget is needed. In one episode, he garbed himself as the "Argyle Avenger", after tipping off Detective Steve Rafferty, who could not make it in time to aid Darcy (Black Scorpion) foil the antagonist's plot. He is played by Brandon Terrell (listed as BT in the credits).
- Veronica "Tender Lovin'": Argyle's girlfriend and a former hooker, Argyle and she are constantly arguing about relationship issues. She is played by Enya Flack.
- Arthur "Artie" Worth: Angel City's extremely corrupt as well as criminally incompetent mayor, played by Robert Pine, often involved in various shady deals either to fund his campaign for re-election or his extravagant lifestyle. Many criminals in the city are created because of his half-baked scheming, including his own deputy mayor who he often scapegoats for his crimes.
- Dr. Phineas Phoenix: A scientist who deals in reanimating the dead and creating clones, his goal is to take a criminal and reform him into a productive member of society. As a result, several of Black Scorpion's enemies return from fatal defeats at her hand (Breathtaker, Inferno, and Gangster Prankster). He is played by Raye Birk.
- Captain Henry Strickland is the equally unqualified chief of police in the Angel City precinct and the morbidly obese senior officer of Darcy, Steve, Specs and Slugger, and all the rest of the force. Rather than conduct serious police work, the captain spends more time stuffing his fat face and chasing after either Specs and/or Slugger whenever they are getting up to something stupid. His first assignment while on the police force as a junior officer had him unjustly imprison Ben Tickerman for a crime he did not commit. A hallucinogenic intoxication brought on by Breathtaker showed his worst nightmare as being subordinate to the vigilante Black Scorpion who was chief of police, indicating some mild insecurities about his job position. He is played by Guy Boyd.

== Villains ==
=== Returning enemies ===
- Breathtaker (Adam West): The first villain Black Scorpion fought, and the reason for her existence. Due to brain damage suffered from a gunshot wound through the lungs, Dr. Noah Goddard is unable to breathe without a special armor he created. After losing his career due to his condition, Goddard became the super-villain Breathtaker, and vowed revenge upon the City of Angels via an asphyxiating gas. His killing of Darcy's father is what drove Darcy to become the titular vigilante. Despite dying in the first Black Scorpion movie, Breathtaker is resurrected by Dr. Phoenix.

Skills: Respiratory surgery, artificial organ replacement, Aerosol chemistry

Weapons: Gas dispensers, mind controlling vapors

- Aftershock (Sherrie Rose): Originally a benevolent seismologist, Professor Ursula Undershaft became the super-villain Aftershock after Mayor Worth ordered the sabotage of a machine she created that could predict earthquakes, as he had hoped to collect on earthquake insurance. With her public image in shambles, Undershaft set out on a rampage of revenge, ultimately planning on creating a massive earthquake that would demolish the city. Seemingly dying after supposedly sacrificing herself to stop her plan in the second movie, Black Scorpion II: Aftershock, the series reveals that she survived and landed in a coma, from which she awakes, and resumes her vendetta. Later died for real when crushed under falling debris, but was soon resurrected by Dr. Phoenix.

Skills: Seismologist

Weapons: Shockwave gauntlets

- The Gangster Prankster (Stoney Jackson): The older brother of Argyle, Luther Simms was driven mad when their parents were shot by dirty cops, and he laughed, thinking it was a joke...until he saw the blood was real. Now stuck with a nightmarish permanent grin on his face, Luther became the super-villain, the Gangster Prankster, and sought to avenge his parents. Unlike Aftershock, the Gangster Prankster died for real in the second movie, and was brought back by Dr. Phoenix, when the doctor tried to rehabilitate him. Naturally, it backfired, and Simms resumed his super-villain career. He died again in his second appearance in the series when Argyle exposes him to his own lethal gas, causing him to explode from laughing.

Skills: Criminal mastermind with a warped sense of humor.

=== New enemies ===
- FireArm (Martin Kove): A former cop in the City Of Angels, Jack Aimes was forced into early retirement when the actions of the psychotic General Stryker cost him life & limb. Outfitted with a prosthetic gun arm & bionic eye, Aimes resurfaced As FireArm, setting out to force Mayor Worth to repeal a proposition that would stipulate the waiting period of weapon purchases. He dies when his headquarters is blown up by Black Scorpion, but not before getting his revenge on Stryker.

Weapons: Prosthetic gun arm

- Hurricane (Athena Massey): Exposed to the toxic waste in the city's ocean (put there by Mayor Worth's goons on his orders), marine biologist Gail Weathers gained the ability to psychically control the weather. With her equally mutated henchmen, The human-octopus hybrid Squids, Weathers reinvented herself as Hurricane, and plotted to flood the city.

Powers: Weather control

- Flashpoint (Allen Scotti): The top photojournalist at the Angel's Herald, Cameron Albright was obsessed with uncovering Black Scorpion's secret identity. This would ultimately be his downfall, as when he attempted to snap a pic of her unmasked face while she was facing the Red Dragons, and she used her Scorpion Ring to stop him, accidentally blinding him in the process. Now wanting revenge, despite his eyes being fixed by advanced laser surgery, Albright became the super-villain Flashpoint, and sought to blind the rest of the city, so they could live in darkness like him.

Skills: Ex-photojournalist; criminal mastermind

- Inferno (Brent Huff): Originally a dedicated firefighter who struck up a romance with Darcy, Adam Burns stil resolved to help people after Mayor Worth made cutbacks that cost him his job. While chasing an arsonist (who was Mayor Worth's former cellmate, and acting on his orders), Adam was hit by solar energy, causing him to burn anything he touched. Driven mad by this, Adam became Inferno, and died at the end of his first appearance. He was later resurrected by Dr. Phoenix.

Powers: Pyrokinesis

- Medusa (Lisa Boyle): Disfigured due to a schoolyard prank, Minerva Stone was cruelly nicknamed Medusa, until the day she found magic mineral water that restored her beauty. She then developed a cement gun that turned people to stone, which she then used on all the bachelors that visited her spa in Angel City, placing them in her garden, with Steve being one of her victims.

Skills: Criminal mastermind

Weapons: Cement gun

- Clockwise (Frank Gorshin): Wrongfully imprisoned on faulty charges for twenty-five years by then beat cop Henry Strickland, Ben Tickerman learned how to make clocks in prison, and became obsessed with time. Upon release from prison, Tickerman became the time themed terrorist Clockwise. With the help of his three henchmen, the tall Big Hand, the diminutive Small Hand, and the evil Hourglass, he set about avenging himself upon the people responsible for his imprisonment, using a special device he created to accelerate their aging process. He was later killed when Black Scorpion reflected the device's beam back on him, rapidly aging him to dust.

Skills: Criminal mastermind with mastery of precision timing; Engineering

Weapons: Time freezing stopwatch; Age accelerating device

- Aerobicide (Renee Allman): A misandrist who, after excessive exercise destroyed her muscles and cost her the use of her legs, was outfitted with cybernetic implants that increased her strength and agility to superhuman levels. Hellbent on reducing the male population of the city, Suzy Pain now named Aerobicide and her two female goons, Bend (Faith Salie) and Stretch (Ava Fabian) targeted rich men and had them exercise to death, then stole their money. Aerobicide was eventually killed when Black Scorpion took control of her implants, and gave her a taste of her own medicine.

Powers: Cybernetically enhanced strength and agility

- Pollutia (Julie McCullough): A former student of Breathtaker, Dr. Ariel Haze was dedicated to protecting the environment, but her contact with him cost her her job. Wanting to help her former mentor, Haze attempted to steal a chemical that would help Breathtaker breath without his armor. During a fight with Black Scorpion, the chemical spills on Haze, enabling her to transmute her body into smog. Dubbing herself Pollutia, Haze sets out to kill all polluters. In her final battle with Black Scorpion, Pollutia was sucked up by the Stingray's Aero Vacuum, and trapped in a bottle.

Powers: Smog conversion

- Greenthumb (David Lander): A florist whose heart was shattered by Mayor Worth's bimbo secretary, Babette, Eugene Gardner turned to a life of crime as the vile vegetation villain, Greenthumb. Still infatuated with Babette, Greenthumb unleashed a deadly pollen on the city on Valentine's Day, and blackmailed the city for the antidote. He died when he was eaten by one of his own plants.

Skills: Florist, chemistry

- Mindbender (Lana Clarkson): Dr. Sarah Bellum once a promising computer scientist and housing advocate, implored the Mayor to fund her VR simulation research for the homeless of Angel City. Bitterly rejected she would resume her research into virtual reality when an attempted robbery of her computer system caused a surge while she's immersed in her own video game frying her mind. Now becoming the deadly supervillain Mindbender, she schemed to use her digitizing skills to entrap individuals within her pixelized domain. Engineering it to kill those in the real world when they die in the virtual one. She was left trapped in her own broken reality after her defeat by Black Scorpion.

Skills: Virtual Reality Programming

- Slapshot: (Greg Kean) Former hockey pro and old friend of Steve's, Ricky Blade was purposely injured by his own teammates and left paralyzed from the waist down. Given a high tech battle suit that restored the use of his legs and gave him super strength, he took the name Slapshot and sought revenge on his traitorous teammates with help from his cheerleader henchwomen. He was defeated and arrested by Black Scorpion with help from Steve.

Skills: Hockey playing

Weapons: Cybernetic battle suit; Metal hockey stick; Explosive hockey pucks

- Angel of Death: (Nancy Valen) Detective Angela Archer, whose father was a preacher who was killed by a thief, was relieved of duty for excessive force. Using arsenic-laced lipstick and taking the name Angel of Death, she sought to rid the streets of all criminals with her kiss of death. Her endgame was to fill the prison with poison gas to kill all the inmates, but was foiled by Black Scorpion, ironically with help from the city super-villains, and arrested.

Skills: martial arts

Weapons: arsenic-laced lipstick

- Stunner: (Alison Armitage) Deputy Mayor Edwina Watts is the bemoaned right-hand woman of the sleazy Mayor Arthur Worth. Often made the butt of the joke due to having been scapegoated by her inept boss for every one of his failed political bankrolling schemes. She's nearly fatally electrocuted when a prisoner's execution goes awry, having gained the power to absorb and redistribute energy. Ms. Watts takes on a new guise with the codename Stunner and wreaks electric havoc on the city of angels in an attempt to usurp Mayor Worth's position. She was eventually defeated by Black Scorpion, who used her stun ring to siphon her electrical energies, then stun her into unconsciousness.

Powers: Electrical Channeling

- Vox Populi: (Shannon Whirry) Considered to be the worst musical talent in all Angel City, Vox and her band, The Bleeding Eardrums, would often cause trouble after every gig they'd play. Regularly resulting in the brutal injuries of most of the audience. Contracted by the corrupt Mayor Worth to air hypnotic songs to boost his reelection campaign. She was eventually beaten and killed by the Black Scorpion, being blasted off a roof with her own guitar.

Skills: (terrible) musician

Weapons: sound manipulating guitar, mind-controlling broadcast studio

== Episodes ==
No.	Title	Featured villain(s)	Directed by	Written by	Original release date
1	"Armed and Dangerous"	FireArm	Gwyneth Gibby	Craig J. Nevius	January 5, 2001
Series pilot. Black Scorpion goes head to head with FireArm, a former cop who lost his arm due to the actions of an urban military group. But the leader of the group may be a bigger menace than the new villain...
2	"Wave Goodbye"	Hurricane	Robert Spera	Lev L. Spiro & Craig J. Nevius	January 12, 2001
Exposure to chemical waste (courtesy of Mayor Worth's goons) turns a marine biologist into the super-powered eco-terrorist, Hurricane.
3	"Blinded by the Light"	Flashpoint	Stanley Yung	Craig J. Nevius	January 19, 2001
Black Scorpion creates a new enemy for herself when she accidentally blinds tabloid photographer Cameron Albright as he tries to capture her real identity on film, resulting in the birth of Flashpoint!
4	"Home Sweet Homeless"	Aftershock	Gwyneth Gibby	Raly Radouloff	January 26, 2001
After surviving the events of "Black Scorpion II", Aftershock decides to help the homeless of the city...by evicting the citizens OUT of their own homes!
5	"Love Burns"	Inferno	Dave Blass	Craig J. Nevius	February 2, 2001
A dedicated firefighter turns into the tragic pyrokinetic supervillain Inferno.
6	"Out of Thin Air"	Breathtaker	Robert Spera	Heidi Gerrer & Nick Guthe	February 9, 2001
He's baaaack....Resurrected by Dr. Phoenix, Breathertaker, Black Scorpion's first nemesis, resumes his plan for revenge on the City of Angels. Note: First appearance of Dr. Phoenix.
7	"No Stone Unturned"	Medusa	Jeff Yonis	Craig J. Nevius	February 16, 2001
Using her spa as a front, the evil Medusa begins kidnapping the city's most eligible bachelors, and turning them to stone...including Steve!
8	"Crime Time"	Clockwise	Tim Andrew	Craig J. Nevius	February 23, 2001
Time's not on Black Scorpion's side as Clockwise, a man who was wrongfully imprisoned for a crime twenty-five years ago, begins taking revenge on those who convicted him.
9	"No Sweat"	Aerobicide	Rachel Samuels	Steve Gentile	March 2, 2001
Too much exercise CAN be bad for your health when Aerobicide begins targeting obese millionaires, and literally exercising them to death.
10	"An Officer and a Prankster"	Gangster Prankster	Alex Cassini	Elijah Aron	9 March 2001
Resurrecting the Gangster Prankster, Dr. Phoenix hopes to rehabilitate the crime clown with genetic alterations to make him a more law-abiding citizen. The joke's on the doc, though, when his plan backfires...
11	"Life's a Gas"	Pollutia	Gwyneth Gibby	Steve Gentile & Craig J. Nevius	24 March 2001
Nature fights back when new super villain Pollutia decides to eradicate humanity.
12	"Roses Are Red, You're Dead"	Greenthumb	Tim Andrew	Malcolm Stephens	31 March 2001
Valentine's Day looks a little green, as Greenthumb unleashes a deadly pollen on the city.
13	"Fire and Brimstone"	Inferno & Medusa	Robert Spera	Uncredited	April 7, 2001
While dealing with the love themed villain, Cupid, Black Scorpion also has to content with an alliance between Medusa and a resurrected Inferno.
14	"Virtual Vice"	Mindbender	Susan Tuan	Craig J. Nevius	14 April 2001
After Mayor Worth rejects her proposal to use virtual reality to help the homeless, Dr. Sarah Bellum becomes the super villain Mindbender, and uses her VR technology to control the city.
15	"Bad Sport"	Slapshot	Dave Blass	Nick Guthe & Craig J. Nevius	April 21, 2001
When a hockey player's teammates deliberately injure him, he seeks revenge as the armor-clad Slapshot.
16	"Kiss of Death"	Angel of Death	Tim Andrew	Mike Vital & Craig J. Nevius	April 28, 2001
Both Darcy and Black Scorpion find competition when a new female cop with a "shoot first, ask never" policy becomes the murderous vigilante, the Angel of Death.
17	"He Who Laughs Last"	Gangster Prankster	Michael Mickens	Steve Gentile	May 5, 2001
The punchline'll REALLY kill ya; Manipulating Argyle back into a life of crime, Gangster Prankster creates a gas that makes anyone who laughs literally explode!
18	"Power Play"	Stunner	Scott Valentine	Steve Gentile & Craig J. Nevius	May 12, 2001
19	"Photo Finish"	Flashpoint	Tim Andrew	Craig J. Nevius	May 19, 2001
Flashpoint returns, and learns Black Scorpion's true identity.
20	"Face the Music"	Vox Populi	Robert Spera	Craig J. Nevius	June 16, 2001
It's a new take on the Pied Piper bit when rogue rocker Vox Populi takes control of her fans' minds. In a latest bid to retain his mayoral position, Arthur Worth bequeaths the terrible guitarist hypnotic equipment to coax voters for his re-election campaign.
21	"Zodiak Attack - Part 1"	Professor Prophet, Aftershock, Hurricane, Inferno and Breathtaker	Greg Aronowitz	Craig J. Nevius	June 23, 2001
22	"Zodiak Attack - Part 2"	Professor Prophet, Aftershock, Hurricane, Inferno and Breathtaker	Greg Aronowitz	Craig J. Nevius	June 30, 2001
Series finale. Recruiting Aftershock, Breathtaker, Hurricane, and Inferno, Professor Prophet unleashes elemental fury upon the city. To beat these foes, Black Scorpion May need help from beyond the grave...
