= The Last Seduction II =

1998 film by Terry Marcel

- Movie poster
- Directed by: Terry Marcel
- Written by: David Cummings (screenplay); Steve Barancik (characters)
- Produced by: David Ball
- Starring: Joan Severance; Con O'Neill
- Cinematography: Kevin Rudge; Geza Sinkovics
- Edited by: Belinda Cottrell
- Music by: Jon Mellor
- Production company: Specific Films
- Distributed by: Artisan Home Entertainment; Barnholtz Entertainment; PolyGram Video
- Release date: June 8, 1999
- Running time: 96 minutes
- Country: United States
- Language: English

The Last Seduction II is a 1999 neo-noir film directed by Terry Marcel and starring Joan Severance. The film is a sequel to The Last Seduction, but features none of the original cast or filmmakers.

== Plot ==
Bridget Gregory, a femme fatale hiding from the law in Spain, cons a phone-sex entrepreneur while being pursued by a relentless private investigator.

== Reception ==
The film has a 0% rating on Rotten Tomatoes.

== Cast ==
- Joan Severance as Bridget Gregory
- Con O'Neill as Troy Fenton
- Beth Goddard as Murphy
