= Farrah Fawcett red swimsuit poster =

1976 photograph and poster

The poster, showing Farrah Fawcett in a red swimsuit

The Farrah Fawcett red swimsuit poster shows a photograph of the American model and actress Farrah Fawcett taken by the American photographer Bruce McBroom in 1976. It was commissioned by the Pro Arts poster company, which published it as a pin-up poster the same year. With more than twelve million copies sold, it is considered the best-selling poster to date and is said to be a modern icon and a symbol of the late 1970s.

The photograph shows Farrah Fawcett, then aged 29, wearing a plain one-piece red swimsuit in front of a striped Mexican serape as the only background. The swimsuit's color is sometimes described as reddish orange.

== Creation and publication ==
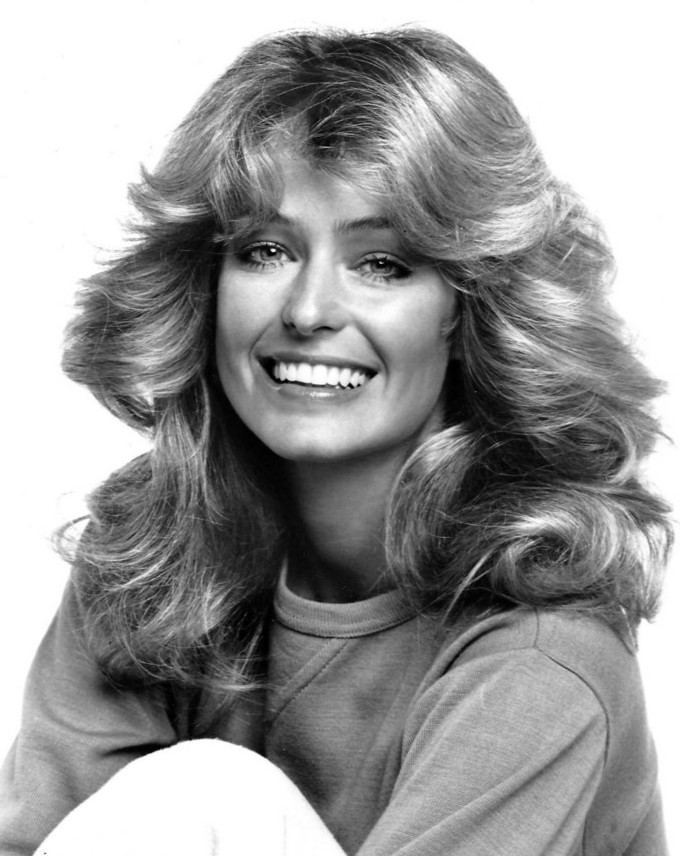
Farrah Fawcett in 1977

The photograph was created in mid-1976 as a commissioned work for the Pro Arts poster company. Ted Trikilis ran the business with his brother and his uncle. According to him, a friend brought Fawcett to his attention in April 1976. She was still unknown, doing commercials for shampoo. His friend and fellow students regarded her as the most beautiful woman on US television. Since there were no posters of her, they clipped shampoo ads from newspapers to hang them on their walls.

Pro Arts agreed with Fawcett, giving her control over the selection of the photos. After she was dissatisfied with the work of two photographers, she suggested Bruce McBroom, with whom she had worked before. The photograph was taken at Fawcett's estate in Los Angeles, where she was living with her husband Lee Majors. The swimsuit, a creation of designer Norma Kamali, was her own, and she also did her styling herself. The striped blanket in the photo's background belonged to McBroom, who used it to cover his car seats. McBroom took several shots that day, and Fawcett chose two, including the one later published as a poster.

The poster was launched in 1976. That same year, Fawcett became popular through her role in the TV series Charlie's Angels. The poster became a great success, selling six million copies the first year. With over twelve million sold copies, it is considered the best-selling poster.

== Analysis ==
In 2003, the communication scientist Chadwick Roberts published an essay about the Fawcett poster and its significance for social developments in the United States. He noted a change in feminine beauty ideal. Compared to the pin-up photographs of the 1940s, Fawcett's hips were narrow, and her breasts were small. While the models of the 1940s had button noses, her nose was long, thin, and prominent. In comparison with Mae West and Marilyn Monroe, for example, Fawcett showed a restrained way of being sexy. Fawcett's abundant unbound hair contrasted the androgynous style of the late 1960s and early 1970s. According to Roberts, she thus represented a new style of the all-American girl, and the presentation of her nipples and the inner part of her thigh, which was avoided in the 1940s, indicated a change in morality in the United States.

Roberts also noted a difference between Fawcett and Monroe in how their star images were created. While men made Monroe's, Fawcett was in control of her image.

== Legacy ==
The poster was used in the 1977 film Saturday Night Fever, hanging in the room of Tony Manero next to a picture of Al Pacino. The poster also features in the 1997 film Boogie Nights, which is set in the 1970s.

In the song "eBay", "Weird Al" Yankovic sings that he is "gonna buy that Farrah Fawcett poster, Pez dispensers, and a toaster" on the titular website.

In 2011, the Mattel toy manufacturing company published a Barbie collector's doll which re-enacts the poster. The same year, Fawcett's family donated several objects from the property of the actress, who had died in 2009, to the National Museum of American History of the Smithsonian Institution. Among them were a copy of the poster, the swimsuit, and a puzzle showing the photo. The items have since been exhibited in the museum's Division of Culture and the Arts.

The poster was the subject of several court cases. Pro Arts sued Campus Craft Holdings from Alberta, Canada, which sold over 90,000 copies of the poster without permission. In 1980, the Ontario High Court of Justice fined the company over 270,000 Canadian dollars. Campus Craft Holdings appealed this judgment but withdrew the appeal after paying less than the judgment. A lawsuit against Hustler was lost by Pro Arts. The erotic magazine had published an advertisement showing the Fawcett poster in the background. The United States Court of Appeals for the Sixth Circuit decided that this usage was a fair use, as the poster's size was small in total and in comparison to the advertisement's size. Furthermore, it said the advertisement had no negative effect on the market or the poster's value.

== Bibliography ==
- Roberts, Chadwick (2003). "The Politics of Farrah's Body: The Female Icon as Cultural Embodiment". The Journal of Popular Culture. 37 (1): 83–104. doi:10.1111/1540-5931.00055.
