= Pro Arts =

Poster company

- Type: Poster company
- Defunct: Liquidated in 1984
- Headquarters: Medina, Ohio, United States
- Key people: Mike Trikilis, Ted Trikilis
- Products: Entertainment posters

Pro Arts (1967–1984) was a poster company founded in Ohio, United States that would create the top selling poster in the world, the Farrah Fawcett swimsuit poster. The poster sold over 12 million copies but the company couldn't survive and in a controversial series of events the company filed for Chapter 11 bankruptcy in 1981 and was liquidated in 1984.

== Small beginning ==
Mike and Ted Trikilis dropped out of Kent State in 1967 opening a gallery and art-supply store called the Green Gas House. A visit by a Chicago poster vendor changed everything when the brothers bought 300 anti-war posters. The posters flew off the shelf and sensing an opportunity they moved to Medina changed the name to Pro Arts Inc and became Ohio's number one and only distributor of youth-oriented posters. They employed free lance student artists, either buying the posters outright or paying as little as $0.05 royalty fee per poster if the artists kept the rights to the art work.

== Poster company of the stars ==
Ted Trikilis would call agents to get permission to use Hollywood stars likenesses by guaranteeing a $6,000 return on every signed contract. Sales had to be big to meet the high $6000 guarantee, but a poster of the Fonz sold more than a quarter-million copies which bumped Pro Arts in the big leagues.

== Swimsuit poster ==
In April 1976, Ted was planting trees on his apple farm when one of his neighbor's kids mentioned that he and his friends were buying women's magazines to get pictures of a then-unknown blond beauty, Farrah Fawcett. Ted knew he had a good lead and quickly made the arrangements to get a shoot with Fawcett. Ted wanted a bikini shot, but Fawcett instead used a one-piece red swimsuit to hide a large scar on her stomach. The poster, with Fawcett's right nipple protruding visibly against the swimsuit material, was released around the same time as the TV series starring Fawcett Charlie's Angels aired. Having prominent nipples displayed for the first time on a poster in the US, it went on to sell millions of copies - unheard of in the poster business. This became known as the "Farrah Phenomenon" and it propelled Pro Arts into a multi-million-dollar company.

== Downfall ==
The Farrah Phenomenon attracted new stars to Pro Arts who wanted to duplicate Farrah's success. This and a deal with K-mart to provide half a million posters inspired Ted to launch a plan to install 2000 poster racks a year in retail racks around the country. Trouble first appeared when Elvis died. Seeing a huge money making chance Pro Arts released a regal poster of the King as a commemoration poster. A rival company who had bought all the rights to post-death Elvis memorabilia sued and even though Pro Arts eventually won the Elvis case they lost more than $1 million in sales and $150,000 on lawyers all for a paltry $17,000 in damages. Huge debt and rising interest forced Pro Arts to file for Chapter 11 bankruptcy in 1981. Over 600 creditors laid claim to Pro Arts and after years of lawsuits and a slumping poster business in 1984 the company was liquidated along with its Medina factory, its equipment, and ultimately Mike and Ted's houses.

When the dust settled Ted Trikilis spent months going over just what happened and after viewing the paperwork claims that his own attorneys in cahoots with the legal system decided to tear apart Pro Arts for their own material gain. He eventually wrote a book, The Unindicted: From Farrah to Fraud, the True Story, where he went on to claim that double-crossing lawyers, inept Federal judges, crooked investors and the New York Mafia played their roles in dismantling Pro Arts.
