= Terry Marcel =

British film director (born 1942)

- Born: 10 June 1942 (age 83); Oxford, England
- Occupation: Film director
- Children: Rosie Marcel; Kelly Marcel

Terry Marcel (born 10 June 1942, Oxford, England) is a British film director, perhaps best known for the cult film Hawk the Slayer (1980), which he co-created with producer Harry Robertson.

His other films include Prisoners of the Lost Universe, The Last Seduction II and Jane and the Lost City, while his TV work includes fantasy series Dark Knight, an update on the Ivanhoe legend with fantasy trappings.

His children include the actress Rosie Marcel and the writer and actress Kelly Marcel.
