= Farrah Fawcett =

American actress (1947–2009)

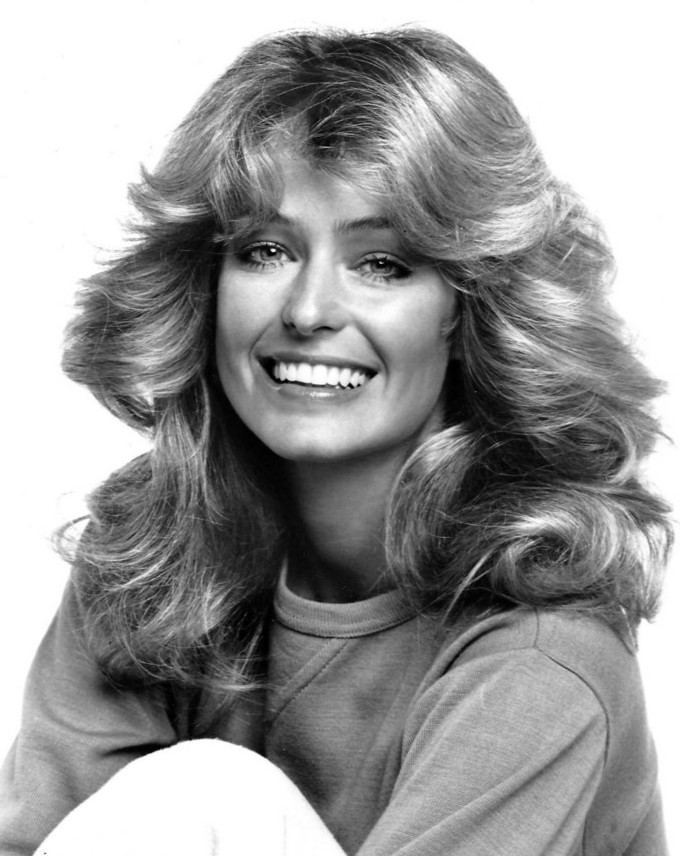
- Fawcett in 1977
- Born: Mary Ferrah Leni Fawcett; February 2, 1947; Corpus Christi, Texas, U.S.
- Died: June 25, 2009 (aged 62); Santa Monica, California, U.S.
- Burial place: Westwood Village Memorial Park Cemetery
- Other name: Farrah Fawcett-Majors
- Occupation: Actress
- Years active: 1969–2009
- Known for: Charlie's Angels; The Burning Bed; Extremities; Small Sacrifices
- Spouse: Lee Majors (m. 1973; div. 1982)
- Partner: Ryan O'Neal (1979–1997; 2001–2009)
- Children: 1

Mary Ferrah Leni Fawcett (February 2, 1947 – June 25, 2009) was an American actress. A four-time Primetime Emmy Award nominee and six-time Golden Globe Award nominee, Fawcett rose to international fame when she played a starring role in the first season of the television series Charlie's Angels.

Fawcett began her career in the 1960s appearing in commercials and guest roles on television. During the 1970s, she appeared in numerous television series, including recurring roles on Harry O (1974–1976), and The Six Million Dollar Man (1974–1978) with her then-husband, film and television star Lee Majors. Her iconic red swimsuit poster sold six million copies in its first year in print. With co-stars Kate Jackson and Jaclyn Smith, she starred in the television series Charlie's Angels, playing private investigator Jill Munroe. However, she left at the conclusion of the first season in 1976, returning as a guest star in six episodes during the show's third and fourth seasons (1978–1980). She received her first Golden Globe nomination for her work in the show.

In 1983, Fawcett received positive reviews for her performance in the Off-Broadway play Extremities. She was subsequently cast in the 1986 film version and received a Golden Globe nomination. She received Emmy Award nominations for her role as a battered wife in The Burning Bed (1984) and for her portrayal of real-life murderer Diane Downs in Small Sacrifices (1989). Her 1980s work in TV movies earned her four additional Golden Globe nominations. Although Fawcett weathered some negative press for a rambling appearance on The Late Show with David Letterman in 1997, she garnered strong reviews that year for her role in the film The Apostle with Robert Duvall. In the 21st century, she continued acting on television, holding recurring roles on the sitcom Spin City (2001) and the drama The Guardian (2002–2003). For the latter, she received her third Emmy nomination. Her film credits include Love Is a Funny Thing (1969), Myra Breckinridge (1970), Logan's Run (1976), Sunburn (1979), Saturn 3 (1980), The Cannonball Run (1981), Extremities (1986), The Apostle (1997), Dr. T & the Women (2000) and The Cookout (2004).

Fawcett was diagnosed with anal cancer in 2006 and died three years later at age 62. The 2009 NBC documentary Farrah's Story chronicled her struggle with the disease. She posthumously earned her fourth Emmy nomination for her work as a producer on Farrah's Story.

== Early life ==
Mary Ferrah Leni Fawcett was born on February 2, 1947, in Corpus Christi, Texas, the younger of two daughters. Her mother, Pauline Alice Evans; 1914–2005, was a homemaker and her father, James William Fawcett (1917–2010), was an oil field contractor. She was of Irish, French, English and Choctaw Native American ancestry. Fawcett once said the name "Ferrah" was "made up" by her mother, because it went well with their last name; she later changed her name to "Farrah".

A Roman Catholic, Fawcett began her early education at the parish school of the church her family attended, St. Patrick's Roman Catholic Church in Corpus Christi. She graduated from W. B. Ray High School in Corpus Christi, where she was voted "most beautiful" by her classmates in her freshman, sophomore, junior, and senior years of high school. Between 1965 and 1968, she attended the University of Texas, where she studied microbiology before switching her major to art, studying under Charles Umlauf, her "favorite professor" with whom she had a close mentoring relationship; in 2017, works by Fawcett were shown at the Umlauf Sculpture Garden and Museum in Austin in the exhibit Mentoring a Muse. She lived at the Mayfair House on Pearl Street, west of the campus, and was a member of Delta Delta Delta sorority.

In her freshman year of college, she was named one of the "ten most beautiful coeds on campus", and it was the first time that a freshman had been chosen for the honor. Her photos were sent to various agencies in Hollywood. David Mirisch, a Hollywood agent, called her and urged her to come to Los Angeles. She turned him down, but he continued for the next two years. Finally, in the summer of 1968, Fawcett moved to Los Angeles, initially staying at the Hollywood Studio Club, with her parents' permission to "try her luck" in the entertainment industry.

== Career ==
=== Early career ===
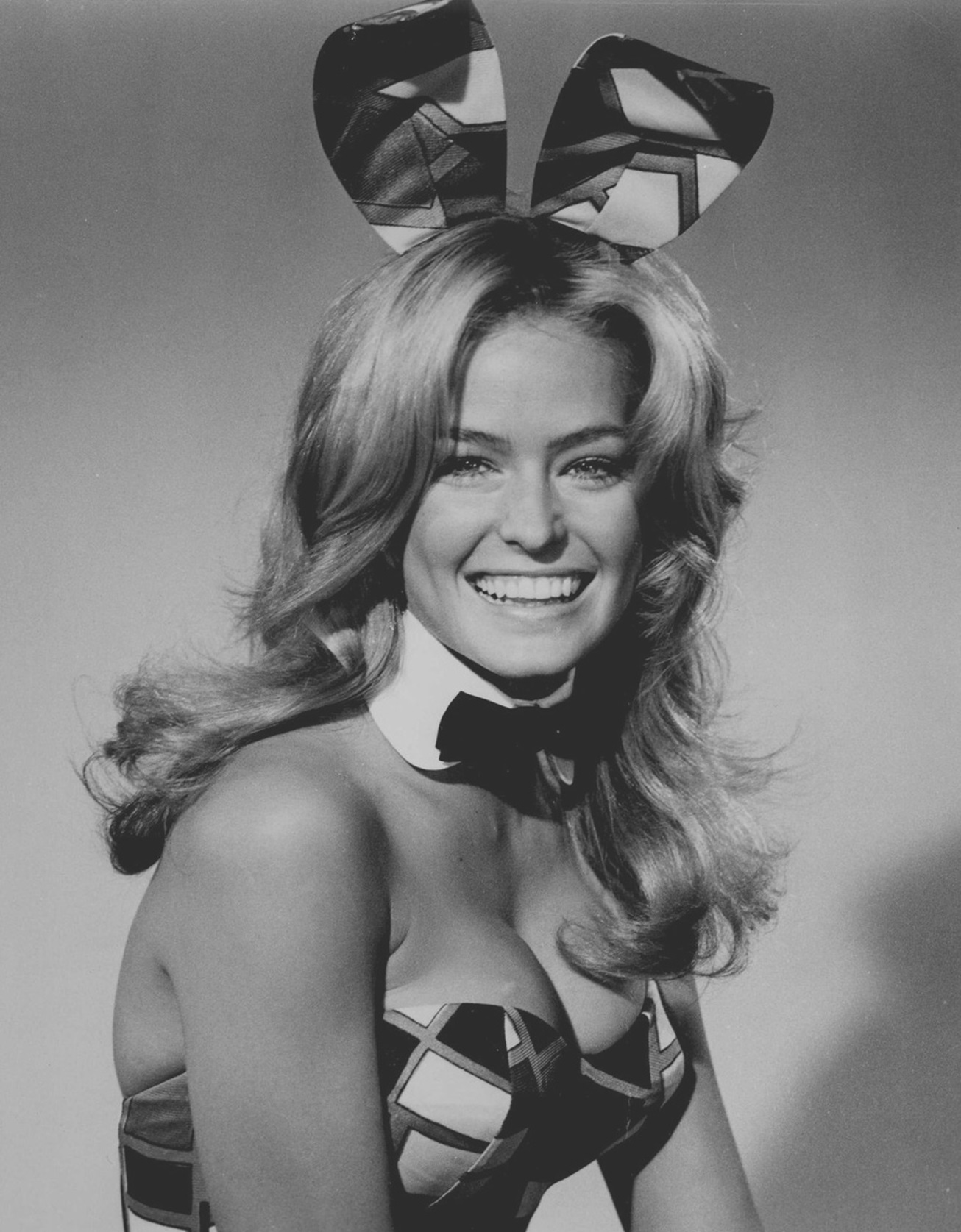
Studio portrait for The Feminist and the Fuzz, 1971

When Fawcett arrived in Hollywood at age 21 in 1968, Screen Gems signed her to a $350-a-week contract. She began to appear in commercials for such products as Ultra Brite toothpaste, Noxzema skin cream, Max Factor cosmetics, Mercury Cougar automobiles, and Beautyrest mattresses, among others. Her earliest acting appearances were guest spots on The Flying Nun (1969) and I Dream of Jeannie (1969–70). She made numerous other television appearances, including Getting Together, Owen Marshall: Counselor at Law, Mayberry R.F.D., and The Partridge Family. She appeared in four episodes of The Six Million Dollar Man with husband Lee Majors, on The Dating Game and S.W.A.T., and had a recurring role on Harry O alongside David Janssen as the title character's girlfriend, Sue. She had a sizable part in the 1969 French romantic-drama Love Is a Funny Thing. She played the role of Mary Ann Pringle in Myra Breckinridge (1970).

=== Rise to stardom ===
In 1976, Pro Arts Inc. pitched the idea of a poster of Fawcett to her agent. A photo shoot was then arranged with photographer Bruce McBroom, who was hired by the poster company. According to friend Nels Van Patten, Fawcett styled her own hair and did her makeup without the aid of a mirror. Her blonde highlights were further heightened by a squeeze of lemon juice. Fawcett selected her six favorite pictures from 40 rolls of film, and the choice was eventually narrowed to the one that made her famous. The resulting image of Fawcett in a one-piece red bathing suit is the best-selling poster in history.

Fawcett earned a supporting role in Michael Anderson's science-fiction film Logan's Run (1976) with Michael York. She and her husband, television star Lee Majors, were frequent tennis partners with producer Aaron Spelling. Spelling and his business partner eventually chose Fawcett to play Jill Munroe in their upcoming made-for-TV movie, Charlie's Angels, a movie of the week which aired on March 21, 1976, on ABC. The movie starred Fawcett (then billed as Farrah Fawcett-Majors), Kate Jackson, and Jaclyn Smith as private investigators for Townsend Associates, a detective agency run by a reclusive multimillionaire whom the women had never met in person. Voiced by John Forsythe, the Charles Townsend character presented cases and dispensed advice via a speakerphone to his core team of three female employees, whom he referred to as "Angels". They were aided in the office and occasionally in the field by two male associates, played by character actors David Doyle and David Ogden Stiers. The program quickly earned a huge following, leading the network to air it a second time and approve production for a series, with the pilot's principal cast minus Ogden Stiers.

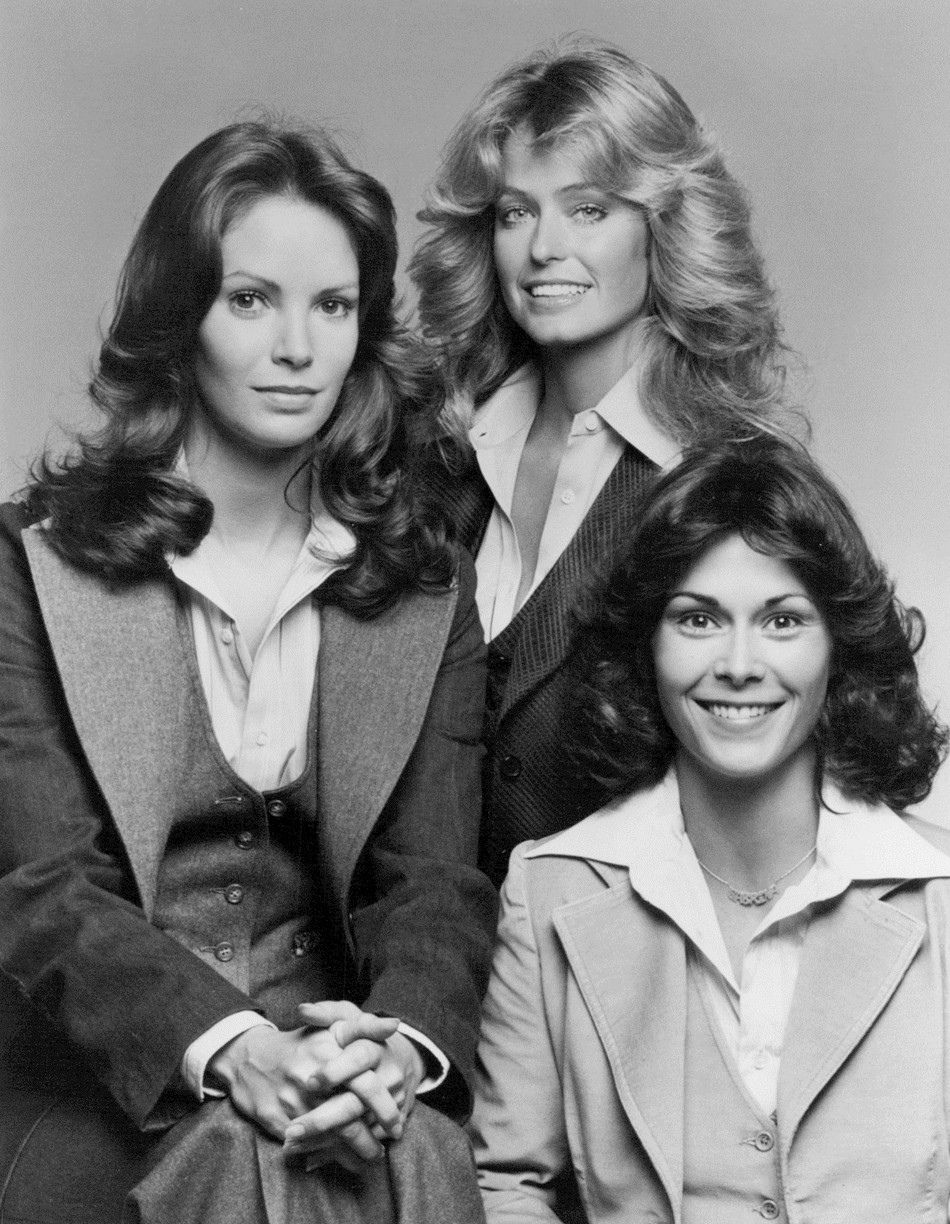
Cast of the television program Charlie's Angels. From left: Jaclyn Smith, Farrah Fawcett, and Kate Jackson in 1976

The Charlie's Angels series proper formally debuted on September 22, 1976. Each of the three actresses was propelled to stardom, but Fawcett dominated popularity polls. She subsequently won a People's Choice Award for Favorite Performer in a New TV Program. In a 1977 interview with TV Guide, she said, "When the show was number three, I thought it was our acting. When we got to be number one, I decided it could only be because none of us wears a bra." Fawcett's appearance in the television show boosted sales of her poster, and she earned far more in royalties from poster sales than from her salary for appearing in Charlie's Angels. Her hairstyle went on to become an international trend, with women sporting a "Farrah-do", a "Farrah-flip", or simply "Farrah hair". Iterations of her hair style predominated among American women's hairstyles well into the 1980s.

In the spring of 1977, Fawcett left Charlie's Angels after only one season. After a series of legal battles over her contract with ABC, Cheryl Ladd replaced her on the show, portraying Jill Munroe's younger sister Kris Munroe. Over the years, numerous explanations were offered for Fawcett's precipitous withdrawal from the show. Because her husband, Lee Majors, was the star of an established television show as well (ABC's Six Million Dollar Man, which aired from 1974 to 1978), the strain on her marriage due to filming schedules that kept them apart for long periods was frequently cited, but her ambition to broaden her acting abilities in films has also been given as an explanation. She never officially signed her series contract with Spelling, owing to protracted negotiations over royalties from her image's use in peripheral products, which led to an even more protracted lawsuit filed by Spelling and his company when she left the show. As a result of leaving her contract four years early, she reluctantly signed a new contract with ABC, stating that she would make six guest appearances on the series over a two-year period (1978–1980).

Charlie's Angels was a global success, maintaining its appeal in syndication and spawning, particularly in the show's first three seasons, a cottage industry of peripheral products, including several series of bubble gum cards, two sets of fashion dolls, numerous posters, puzzles, and school supplies, novelizations of episodes, toy vans, and a board game, all featuring Fawcett's likeness. The "Angels" also appeared on the covers of magazines around the world, from countless fan magazines to TV Guide (four times) to Time.

In 2004, the television film Behind the Camera: The Unauthorized Story of Charlie's Angels dramatized the events from the show, with supermodel and actress Tricia Helfer portraying Fawcett and Ben Browder portraying Lee Majors, Fawcett's then-husband.

=== Post-Angels film roles ===
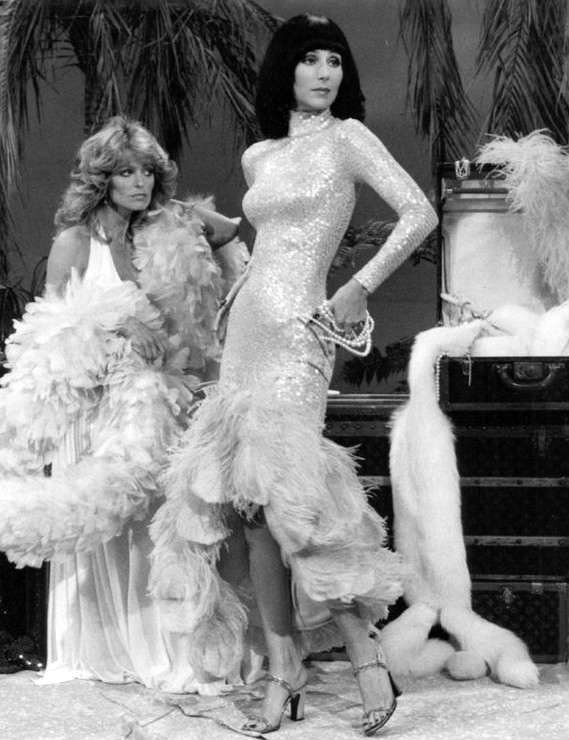
Fawcett (left) with Cher on The Sonny & Cher Show in 1976

In 1978, Fawcett's first post-Angels movie, Somebody Killed Her Husband, was released to adverse reviews (some critics referred to the film as Somebody Killed Her Career) and a poor box-office. The 1979 release of Sunburn, co-starring Charles Grodin and Art Carney, was met by equally unfavorable reviews. In 1980, Fawcett starred with Kirk Douglas in Stanley Donen's science-fiction film Saturn 3; the film earned unfavorable reviews from critics and experienced poor box office sales. The following year she starred alongside an ensemble cast, which included Burt Reynolds, Dean Martin, and Sammy Davis Jr. in the comedy The Cannonball Run (1981). Later that year, she co-starred with Katharine Ross, Sam Elliott, and Andy Griffith in the television movie Murder in Texas.

In 1983, Fawcett won critical acclaim for her role in the Off-Broadway stage production of the controversial play Extremities, written by William Mastrosimone. Replacing Susan Sarandon, she played the role of an attempted rape victim who turns the tables on her attacker. She described the role as "the most grueling, the most intense, the most physically demanding and emotionally exhausting" of her career. During one performance, a stalker in the audience disrupted the show by asking Fawcett if she had received the photos and letters he had mailed her. Police removed the man and were able to issue him a summons only for disorderly conduct.

The following year, her role as battered wife Francine Hughes in the fact-based television movie The Burning Bed (1984) earned her the first of her four Emmy Award nominations. The project was the first television movie to provide a nationwide 800 number that offered help for others in the situation, in this case victims of domestic abuse. It was the highest-rated television movie of the season.

In 1986, Fawcett appeared in the movie version of Extremities, which performed well financially. For her performance she received a Golden Globe nomination for Best Performance by an Actress in a Motion Picture – Drama. She appeared in Jon Avnet's Between Two Women with Colleen Dewhurst, and took several more dramatic roles as either infamous or renowned women. She was nominated for Golden Globe awards for roles as Beate Klarsfeld in Nazi Hunter: The Beate Klarsfeld Story and troubled Woolworth heiress Barbara Hutton in Poor Little Rich Girl: The Barbara Hutton Story, and won a CableACE Award for her 1989 portrayal of groundbreaking LIFE magazine photojournalist Margaret Bourke-White in Double Exposure: The Story of Margaret Bourke-White.

Her 1989 portrayal of convicted murderer Diane Downs in the miniseries Small Sacrifices earned her a second Emmy nomination and her sixth Golden Globe Award nomination. The miniseries won a Peabody Award for excellence in television, with Fawcett's performance singled out by the organization, which stated "Ms. Fawcett brings a sense of realism rarely seen in television miniseries (to) a drama of unusual power".

=== Later career ===
Throughout the 1970s and 1980s, Fawcett had steadfastly resisted signing a release for nude photographs of her to be published in magazines, even though she had briefly appeared topless in the 1980 film Saturn 3. She caused a major stir by posing semi-nude in the December 1995 issue of Playboy. At the age of 50, she appeared in a pictorial for the July 1997 issue of Playboy, which also became a top seller. The issue and its accompanying video featured Fawcett actually using her own body to paint on canvas; for years, this had been one of her ambitions.

On June 5, 1997, Fawcett received negative commentary after she gave a rambling interview and appeared distracted on Late Show with David Letterman. Months later, she told the host of The Howard Stern Show that her behavior was just her way of joking around with the television host, partly in the guise of promoting her Playboy pictorial and video. She explained that what appeared to be random looks across the theater was just her looking and reacting to fans in the audience. Though the Letterman appearance spawned speculation and several jokes at her expense, she returned to the show in 1999. Several years later in February 2009, Letterman ended an incoherent and largely unresponsive interview with Joaquin Phoenix by saying, "We owe an apology to Farrah Fawcett."

Also in 1997, Robert Duvall chose Fawcett to play the role of his wife in The Apostle, which was an independent feature film that he was producing. She received an Independent Spirit Award nomination for Best Supporting Female for the film. In 2000, she worked with director Robert Altman in the feature film Dr. T & the Women, as the wife of Richard Gere. (Her character has a mental breakdown, leading to Fawcett's first fully nude appearance.)

Around 2001, Fawcett befriended artist and designer Christopher Ciccone. Ciccone mentioned Fawcett inviting him to view her abstract paintings and sculptures in his book, Life with My Sister Madonna. In 2002, Fawcett's collaboration with sculptor Keith Edmier was exhibited at the Los Angeles County Museum of Art in a show titled Contemporary Projects 7: Keith Edmier and Farrah Fawcett 2000. The exhibit was later displayed at The Andy Warhol Museum in Pittsburgh, Pennsylvania. The sculpture was also presented in a series of photographs and a book by Rizzoli.

In November 2003, Fawcett prepared for her Broadway debut in a production of Bobbi Boland, the tragicomic tale of a former Miss Florida. However, the show never officially opened when it closed during preview performances. Fawcett was described as "vibrating with frustration" at the producer's extraordinary decision to cancel the production; just days earlier, the same producer closed an Off-Broadway show she had been backing.

Fawcett continued to work in television and appeared in the made-for-television movies and on popular television series that included Ally McBeal, four episodes of Spin City, and four episodes of The Guardian. Her work on the latter show earned her a third Emmy nomination in 2004.

== Personal life ==
=== Relationships ===
Fawcett began dating Lee Majors in the late 1960s. She was married to Majors from 1973 to 1982, although the couple separated in 1979. They had no children. Throughout her marriage (and despite the separation) she used the name Farrah Fawcett-Majors in her screen credits.

In 1979, Fawcett became romantically involved with actor Ryan O'Neal, and they had a son named Redmond James Fawcett O'Neal, who was born in 1985. In 1994, Fawcett told TV Guide that their relationship had some troubles. "Sometimes Ryan breaks my heart, but he's also responsible for giving me confidence in myself," she said. After their split, O'Neal's daughter Tatum O'Neal alleged that he physically abused Fawcett. "He had a terrible temper and was very violent. He beat her up", she said. Fawcett and O'Neal rekindled their relationship in 2001. On June 22, 2009, three days before her death, The Los Angeles Times and Reuters reported that Ryan O'Neal had said that Fawcett had agreed to remarry him as soon as she felt strong enough.

From 1997 to 1998, Fawcett was in a relationship with Canadian filmmaker James Orr, who was the writer and producer of Man of the House, the Disney feature film in which she co-starred with Chevy Chase and Jonathan Taylor Thomas. The relationship ended when Orr was arrested, charged, and later convicted of beating Fawcett during a fight.

Fawcett had dated Longhorn football star Greg Lott while they were undergrads at the University of Texas. Lott said they rekindled their romance in 1998 and had "a loving, consensual, one-on-one relationship" until she died in 2009. He said Ryan O'Neal kept him from seeing Fawcett in her final days. "He kept me from seeing the love of my life before she died", he told ABC News. In Fawcett's living trust she left nothing to O'Neal, but she left $100,000 to Lott. Lott insisted Fawcett's relationship with O'Neal was just for show. "Everything she did with Ryan, including all of those so-called reality shows they made together, was just Hollywood fantasy, something she had to do to keep up her image", he said.

=== Family ===
Fawcett's older sister Diane Fawcett Walls died of lung cancer just before her 63rd birthday on October 16, 2001. The fifth episode of her 2005 Chasing Farrah series followed the actress home to Texas to visit her father, James, and mother, Pauline. Pauline Fawcett died on March 4, 2005, at the age of 91.

Fawcett's only child, Redmond James Fawcett-O'Neal, was fathered by Ryan O'Neal and was born on January 30, 1985. He struggled with drug addiction for most of his adult life and has been confined in a psychiatric facility since being judged unfit to be tried for attempted murder and other charges in 2019, having been diagnosed with "schizophrenia, bipolar disorder, and antisocial personality disorder". As of October 2024, his condition has continued to be resistant to treatment and he remains confined.

=== Cancer ===
Fawcett was diagnosed with anal cancer in 2006, and began treatment that included chemotherapy and surgery. On February 2, 2007 (Fawcett's 60th birthday), the Associated Press reported that Fawcett was cancer-free. The cancer recurred, and in May 2007 she was diagnosed with stage IV cancer that had metastasized to her liver (which has a five-year survival rate of less than 20 percent); a malignant polyp was found where she had been treated for the initial cancer.

Not wanting to undergo a colostomy, Fawcett traveled to Germany for treatments described variously in the press as "aggressive" and "alternative". There, Ursula Jacob prescribed a treatment including surgery to remove the anal tumor, a course of perfusion and embolization for her liver cancer by Claus Kiehling and Thomas Vogl in Germany, and chemotherapy in the US. Although initially the tumors were regressing, their reappearance a few months later necessitated a new course that included laser ablation therapy and chemoembolization. Aided by friend Alana Stewart, Fawcett documented her battle with the disease.

In early April 2009, Fawcett was hospitalized following her return to the United States. On April 6, the Associated Press reported that the cancer had metastasized to Fawcett's liver and explained that the hospitalization was not due to her cancer, but instead due to a painful abdominal hematoma. Fawcett was released from the hospital on April 9.

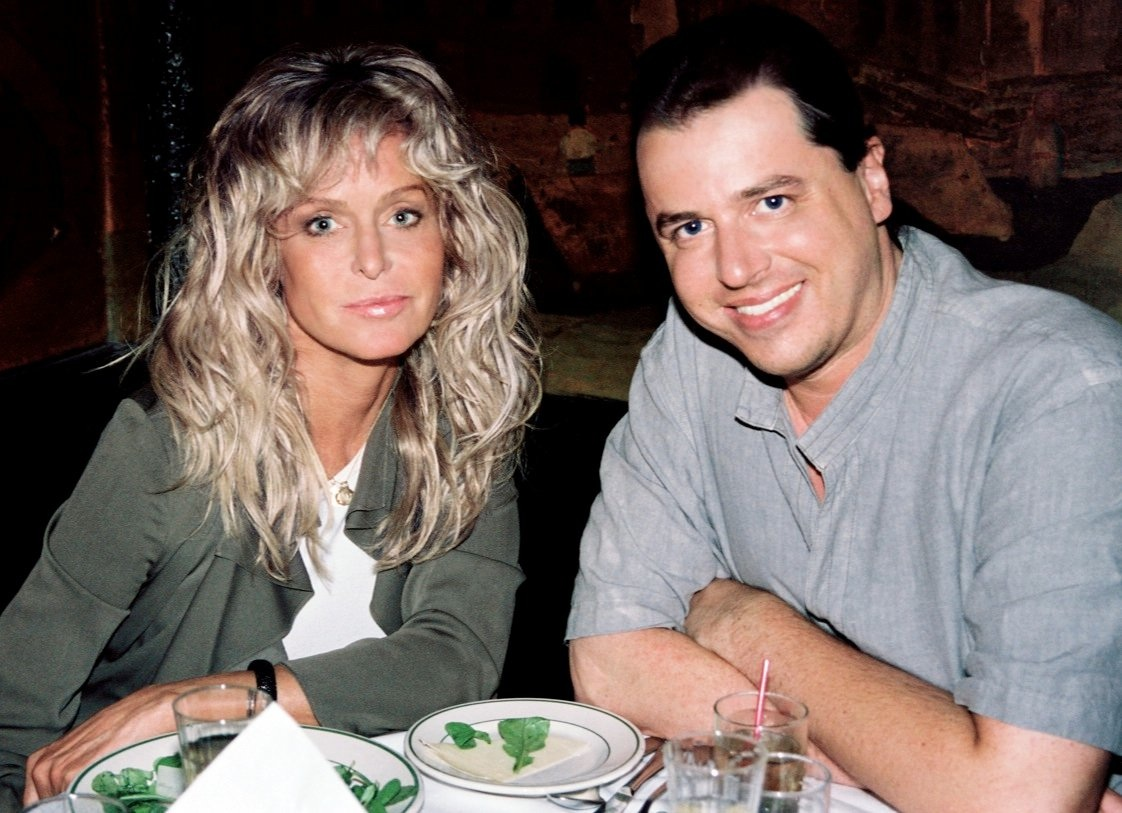
Fawcett with Craig J. Nevius, the director of Chasing Farrah and Farrah's Story, in 2008

A month later on May 7, Fawcett was reported as being critically ill, with Ryan O'Neal quoted as saying she was spending her days at home on an IV and often asleep. The Los Angeles Times reported that she was in the last stages of terminal cancer and had seen her son Redmond in April 2009, although he was shackled and under supervision because he was confined in a psychiatric facility since being judged unfit to be tried for attempted murder and other charges. Her 91-year-old father, James, flew to Los Angeles to visit her.

Cancer specialist Lawrence Piro, who was treating Fawcett in Los Angeles, and Fawcett's friend and Angels co-star Kate Jackson, appeared together on The Today Show. They dispelled tabloid-fueled rumors, including suggestions that Fawcett had been in a coma, had dropped to 86 pounds (39 kg), and had even given up her fight against the disease or lost the will to live.

Farrah's Story, a two-hour documentary filmed by Fawcett and Alana Stewart, aired on NBC on May 15, 2009. At its premiere airing, the documentary was watched by nearly nine million people, and it was re-aired on the broadcast network's cable stations MSNBC, Bravo and Oxygen. Controversy surrounded the aired version of the documentary. Her initial producing partner—who had worked with her four years earlier on her reality series, Chasing Farrah—alleged that the editing of the program by O'Neal and Stewart was not in keeping with Fawcett's wishes to more thoroughly explore alternative methods of treatment of rare types of cancers such as her own. Fawcett posthumously earned her fourth Emmy nomination as the producer of Farrah's Story.

== Death ==
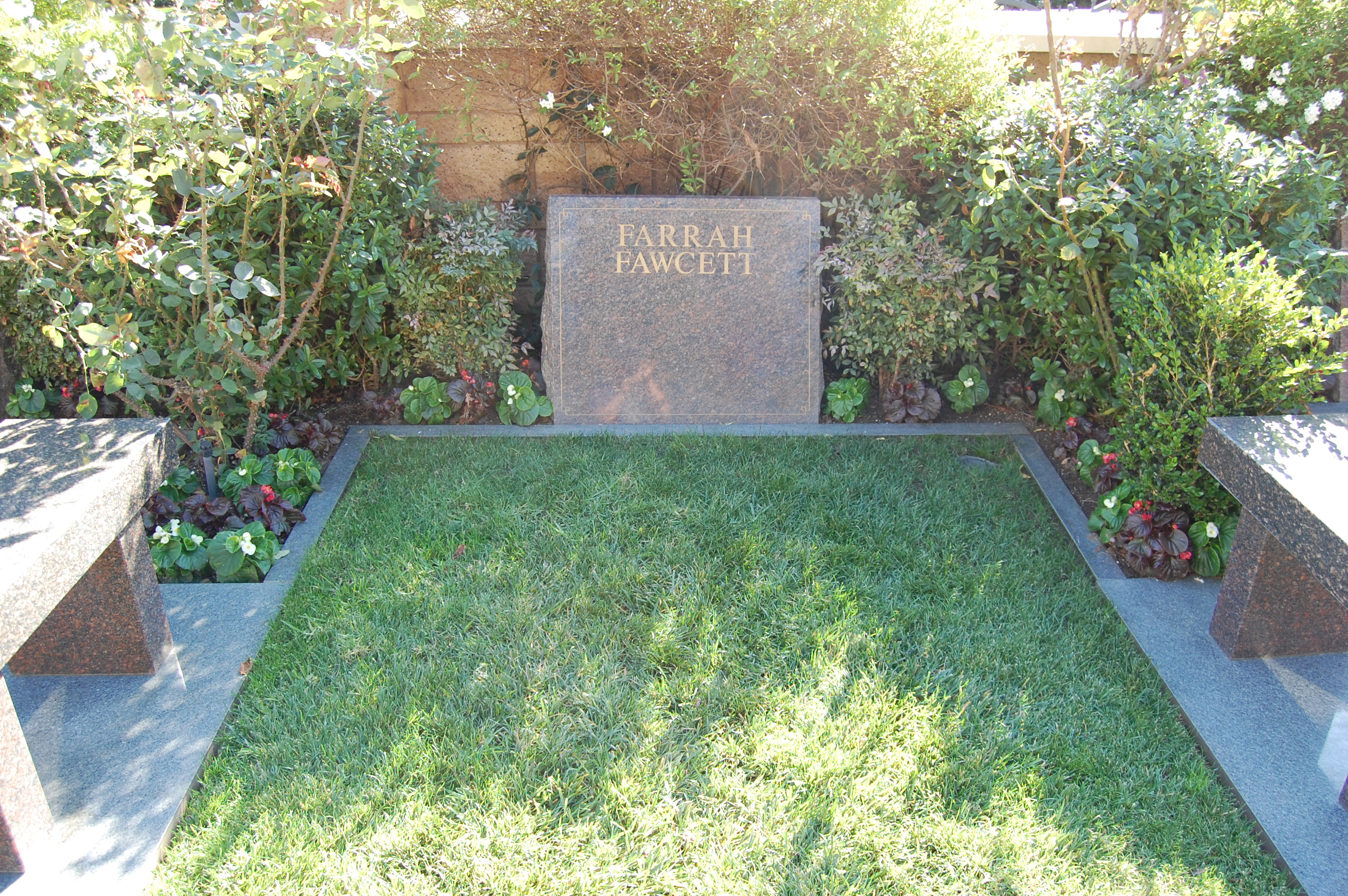
Fawcett's grave, 2011

Fawcett died of anal cancer at 9:28 a.m. PDT on June 25, 2009, at age 62, in Saint John's Health Center, Santa Monica, California, with O'Neal and Alana Stewart by her side.

A private funeral was held in Los Angeles on June 30, 2009. Farrah's son Redmond was permitted by a judge to leave his California detention center to attend the service in civilian clothes while escorted by a Los Angeles County Sheriff's Office detail consisting of several deputies and a sergeant. He gave the first reading and was immediately returned to prison after the service. Fawcett is interred at the Westwood Village Memorial Park in Los Angeles, next to Rodney Dangerfield.

=== Trust and dispute over Warhol portrait ===
Fawcett did not name long-time partner Ryan O'Neal in her living trust, which she had last amended in 2007. She left most of her estate, $4.5 million, to their son Redmond in a trust overseen by her business manager, Richard Francis. While Redmond is permitted to collect interest on the trust, the principal of the trust is available only for matters relating to Redmond's health care. Fawcett also left $500,000 to her nephew, Gregory Walls; $500,000 to her father, James Fawcett; and $100,000 to her college boyfriend, Gregory Lott.

Fawcett's art collection was bequeathed to the University of Texas. When the university received it, one of her Andy Warhol portraits was missing. In 2011, after discovering that O'Neal had retained the portrait, the University filed a lawsuit. O'Neal claimed that Fawcett had given the painting to him. Lott alleged that Fawcett never gave up ownership of the portrait and that it was her wish to bequeath all her artwork to her alma mater. In December 2013, a Los Angeles court ruled that the portrait belonged to O'Neal.

=== Media coverage ===
News of Fawcett's death was largely overshadowed by media coverage of the death of Michael Jackson, which occurred a few hours later on the same day. On the night of her death, ABC aired an hour-long special episode of 20/20 featuring clips from several of Barbara Walters' past interviews with Fawcett, as well as new interviews with Ryan O'Neal, Jaclyn Smith, Alana Stewart, and Dr. Lawrence Piro. Walters followed up on the story on Friday's episode of 20/20. CNN's Larry King Live planned a show exclusively about Fawcett that evening until Jackson's death caused the program to shift to cover both stories. Cher, a longtime friend of Fawcett, and Suzanne de Passe, executive producer of Fawcett's Small Sacrifices mini-series, both paid tribute to Fawcett on the program. Coincidentally, de Passe had worked for Motown Records in the 1960s and '70s, and she had also played a major part in the development of the Jackson 5, which included Michael Jackson. NBC aired a Dateline NBC special "Farrah Fawcett: The Life and Death of an Angel" the following evening, June 26, preceded by a rebroadcast of Farrah's Story in prime time.

That weekend and the following week, television tributes continued. MSNBC aired back-to-back episodes of its Headliners and Legends episodes featuring Fawcett and Jackson. TV Land aired a mini-marathon of Charlie's Angels and Chasing Farrah episodes. E! aired Michael & Farrah: Lost Icons and The Biography Channel aired Bio Remembers: Farrah Fawcett. The documentary Farrah's Story re-aired on the Oxygen Network and MSNBC. BET aired the 2004 movie The Cookout, in which Fawcett had appeared.

Larry King said of the Fawcett phenomenon:

TV had much more impact back in the '70s than it does today. Charlie's Angels got huge numbers every week – nothing really dominates the television landscape like that today. Maybe American Idol comes close, but now there are so many channels and so many more shows it's hard for anything to get the audience, or amount of attention, that Charlie's Angels got. She was a major TV star when the medium was clearly dominant.

Kate Jackson said of her former castmate:

She was a selfless person who loved her family and friends with all her heart, and what a big heart it was. Farrah showed immense courage and grace throughout her illness and was an inspiration to those around her... I well remember her kindness, her cutting dry wit and, of course, her beautiful smile...when you think of Farrah, remember her smiling because that is exactly how she wanted to be remembered: smiling.

=== Academy Awards' omission ===
In March 2010, the Academy of Motion Picture Arts and Sciences upset family and friends of Fawcett when she was excluded from the "In Memoriam" montage at the 82nd Academy Awards ceremony. The inclusion of Michael Jackson in the montage, though he was not primarily known for his film roles, only added to the controversy. Friends and colleagues of Fawcett, including Ryan and Tatum O'Neal, Jane Fonda and film critic Roger Ebert, publicly expressed their outrage at the oversight. AMPAS executive director Bruce Davis noted that Fawcett had been recognized for her "remarkable television work" at the 61st Primetime Emmy Awards in September 2009. On the exclusion, he said: "There's nothing you can say to people, particularly to family members, within a day or two of the show that helps at all. They tend to be surprised and hurt, and we understand that and we're sorry for it."

== Legacy ==
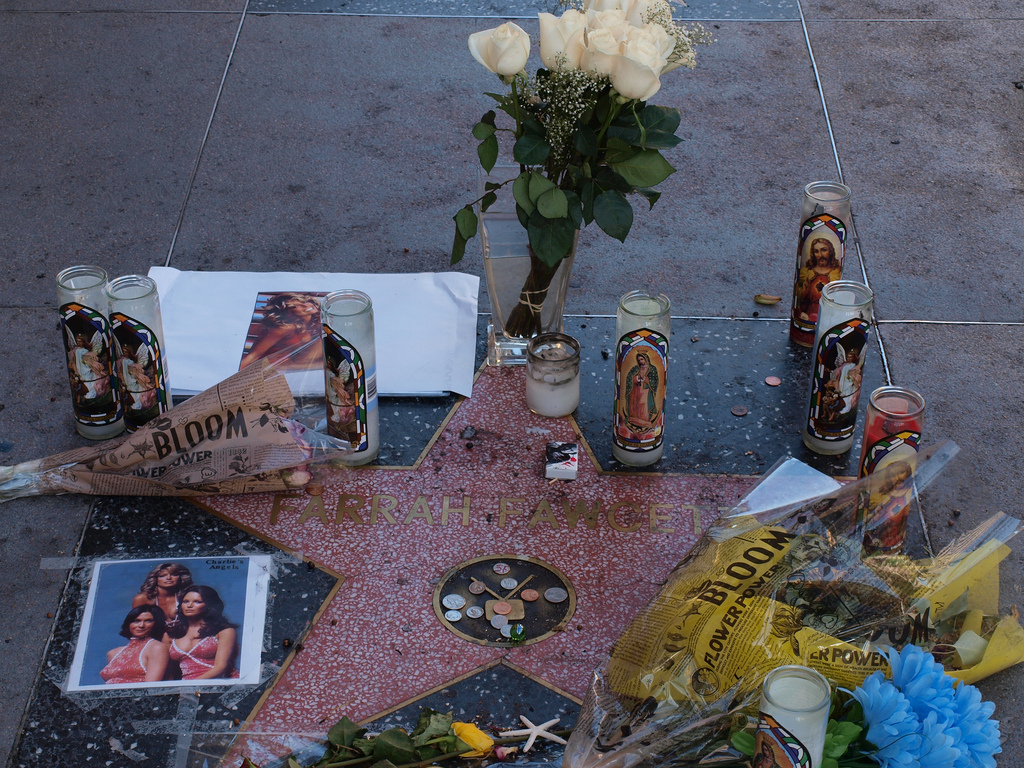
Fawcett's star on the Hollywood Walk of Fame

The red one-piece bathing suit she wore in her famous 1976 poster was donated to the Smithsonian's National Museum of American History (NMAH) on February 2, 2011. Designed by fashion designer Norma Kamali, it was donated to the Smithsonian by her executors and was formally presented to NMAH in Washington, D.C., by her longtime companion Ryan O'Neal.

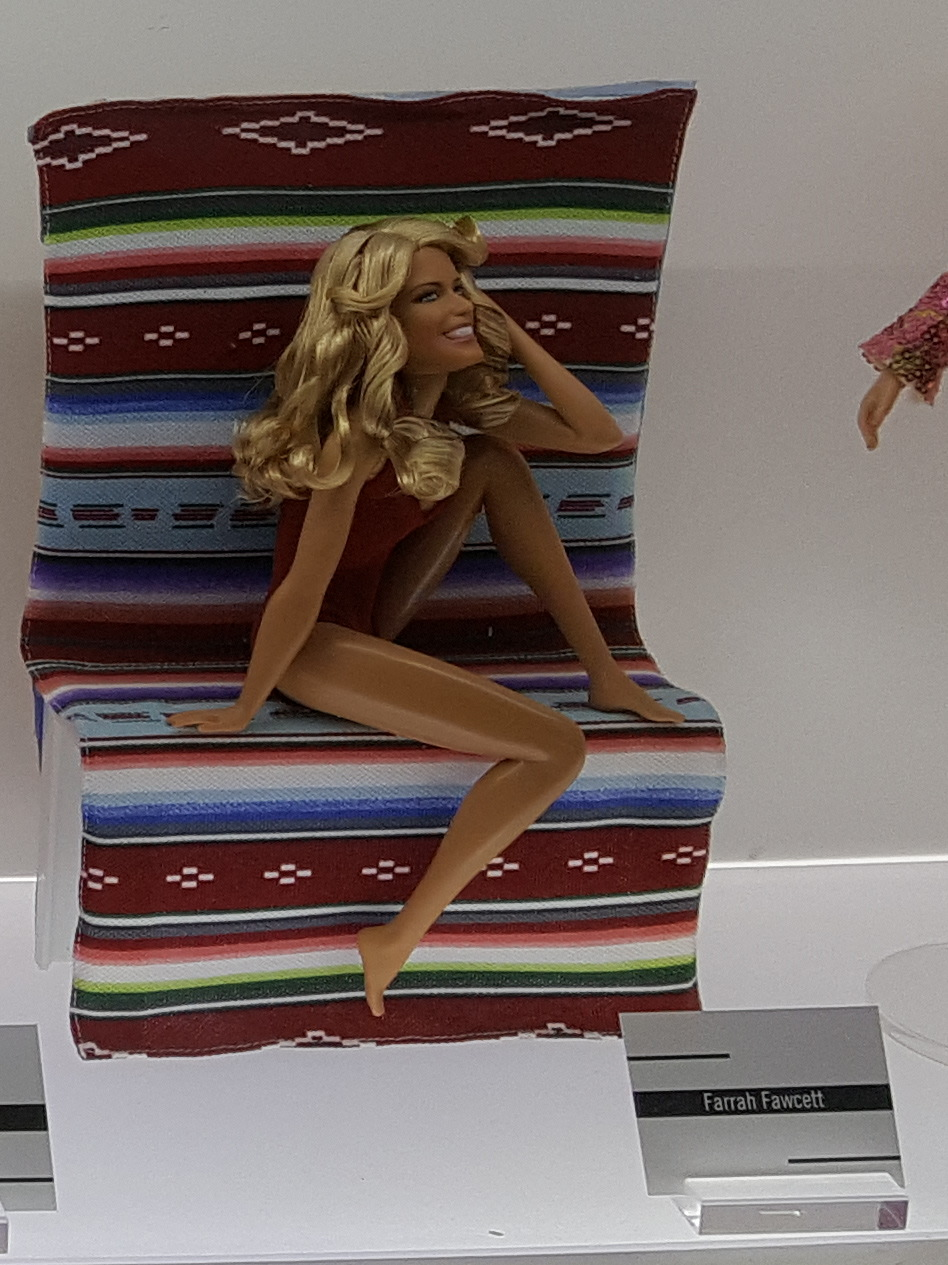
2011 Farrah Fawcett Barbie designed by Bill Greening.

The iconic image of Farrah in a red swimsuit was recreated in 2011 in a limited edition Barbie doll with a gold chain.

Also in 2011, Men's Health named Fawcett in its list of the "100 Hottest Women of All-Time", ranking her at No. 31.

The song "Midnight Train to Georgia" had initially been inspired by Fawcett and Lee Majors. Songwriter James Dawn "Jim" Weatherly phoned Majors, who was one of his friends, but it was Fawcett who actually answered the call. Weatherly and Fawcett chatted briefly and she told him she was going to visit her mother and was taking "the midnight plane to Houston". Although Majors and Fawcett were both successful by that time, Weatherly used them as "characters" in his song, about a failed actress who leaves Los Angeles and is followed by her boyfriend who cannot live without her. Eventually the genders were swapped to a failed actor who leaves Los Angeles and is followed by his girlfriend, a train replaced the plane, and Houston was changed to Georgia. The recording by Gladys Knight & the Pips attained the number 1 position on the Billboard chart in 1973.

In 1980, O'Neal facilitated a meeting between Fawcett and artist Andy Warhol, who created two portraits of Fawcett during their time together. Fawcett later lent the portraits to The Andy Warhol Museum. Following a 2013 court case between O'Neal and the University of Texas, which had been named by Fawcett as the recipient of all of her artwork, one of the portraits was deemed the property of O'Neal. The portrait was valued at between $800,000 and $12 million during the court case.

In 2017, second season of the Netflix television series Stranger Things features Farrah Fawcett hairspray where Steve Harrington uses it and reveals his hair routine secret to Dustin Henderson. The resurgence of Stranger Things helped introduce Farrah Fawcett to Generation Z and the product gained a major surge in modern popularity of recreating iconic 70s and 80s feathered blowouts.

== Filmography ==
=== Film ===
Year	Film	Role	Notes
1969	Love Is a Funny Thing	Patricia	
1970	Myra Breckinridge	Mary Ann Pringle	
1976	Logan's Run	Holly 13	As Farrah Fawcett-Majors
1978	Somebody Killed Her Husband	Jenny Moore	As Farrah Fawcett-Majors
1979	An Almost Perfect Affair	Herself	Uncredited
1979	Sunburn	Ellie	As Farrah Fawcett-Majors
1980	Saturn 3	Alex	Nominated – Razzie Award for Worst Actress
1981	The Cannonball Run	Pamela Glover	Nominated – Razzie Award for Worst Supporting Actress
1984	The Burning Bed		
1986	Extremities	Marjorie	Nominated – Golden Globe Award for Best Actress – Motion Picture Drama
1989	See You in the Morning	Jo Livingstone	
1995	Man of the House	Sandy Archer	
1997	The Apostle	Jessie Dewey	Nominated – Independent Spirit Award for Best Supporting Female
1997	The Lovemaster	Craig's Dream Date	
1997	Playboy: Farrah Fawcett, All of Me	Herself	Direct to video
1998	The Brave Little Toaster Goes to Mars	Faucet	Voice
2000	The Flunky	Herself	
2000	Dr. T & the Women	Kate Travis	
2004	The Cookout	Eileen Crowley	Final role
2008	A Wing & a Prayer: Farrah's Fight for Life	Herself	Documentary

=== Television ===
Year	Title	Role	Notes
1969	Mayberry R.F.D.	Show Girl No. 1	Episode: "Millie, the Model"
1969	I Dream of Jeannie	Cindy / Tina	2 episodes
1969	Three's a Crowd	Hitchhiker	ABC Movie of the Week
1969–1970	The Flying Nun	Miss Preem / Lila	2 episodes
1970	Days of Our Lives	Diana Washburn	1 episode
1970	The Young Rebels	Sarah	Episode: "Dangerous Ally"
1970	The Partridge Family	Pretty Girl	Episode: "The Sound of Money"
1971	Owen Marshall: Counselor at Law	Tori Barbour	2 episodes
1971	The Feminist and the Fuzz	Kitty Murdock	ABC Movie of the Week
1971	Inside O.U.T.	Pat Boulion	Unsold pilot
1973	The Girl with Something Extra	Carol	Episode: "How Green Was Las Vegas"
1973	The Great American Beauty Contest	T.L. Dawson, Miss Texas	ABC Movie of the Week
1973	Of Men and Women	Young Actress	Segment: "The Interview"
1974	Apple's Way	Jane Huston	Episode: "The First Love"; Billed as Farrah Fawcett-Majors
1974	Marcus Welby, M.D.	Laura Foley	Episode: "I've Promised You a Father: Part 1"
1974	McCloud	Gloria Jean	Episode: "The Colorado Cattle Caper"
1974–1976	Harry O	Sue Ingham	8 episodes Billed as Farrah Fawcett-Majors
1974–1978	The Six Million Dollar Man	Major Kelly Wood (2 episodes) / Trish Hollander / Victoria Webster	4 episodes Billed as Farrah Fawcett-Majors
1975	The Girl Who Came Gift-Wrapped	Patti	ABC Movie of the Week
1975	Murder on Flight 502	Karen White	TV movie Billed as Farrah Fawcett-Majors
1975	S.W.A.T.	Miss New Mexico	Episode: "The Steel-Plated Security Blanket"; Billed as Farrah Fawcett-Majors
1976–1980	Charlie's Angels	Jill Munroe	Main cast (1976–1977); Special guest star (1978–1980); Nominated – Golden Globe Award for Best Actress – Television Series Drama (1976)
1976	The Captain and Tennille Show	Herself	Episode: "The Captain & Tennille: Ultimate Collection"
1977	The Sonny and Cher Show	Herself / Various characters	2 episodes Billed as Farrah Fawcett-Majors
1977	The Brady Bunch Hour	Herself	Episode: "January 23, 1977"; Billed as Farrah Fawcett-Majors
1981	Murder in Texas	Joan Robinson Hill	TV movie; Based on a true story and on Thomas Thompson's 1976 award-winning book "Blood and Money"
1984	The Red-Light Sting	Kathy	TV movie
1984	The Burning Bed	Francine Hughes	Television movie Nominated – Emmy Award for Outstanding Lead Actress – Miniseries or a Movie; Nominated – Golden Globe Award for Best Actress – Miniseries or Television Film
1986	Between Two Women	Val Petherton	TV movie
1986	Nazi Hunter: The Beate Klarsfeld Story	Beate Klarsfeld	TV movie Nominated – Golden Globe Award for Best Actress – Miniseries or Television Film
1987	Poor Little Rich Girl: The Barbara Hutton Story	Barbara Hutton	TV movie Nominated – Golden Globe Award for Best Actress – Miniseries or Television Film
1989	Double Exposure: The Story of Margaret Bourke-White	Margaret Bourke-White	TV movie Cable ACE Award – Best Actress in a Telefilm Documentary/Drama
1989	Small Sacrifices	Diane Downs	Nominated – Emmy Award for Outstanding Lead Actress – Miniseries or a Movie; Nominated – Golden Globe Award for Best Actress – Miniseries or Television Film
1991	Good Sports	Gayle Roberts	15 episodes
1992	Criminal Behavior	Jessie Lee Stubbs	TV movie
1994	The Substitute Wife	Pearl	TV movie
1995	Children of the Dust	Nora Maxwell	Miniseries
1996	Dalva	Dalva Northridge	Television movie
1997	Johnny Bravo	Farrah Fawcett / Old Lady (voice)	Episode: "Blarney Buddies/Over the Hump/Johnny Meets Farrah Fawcett"
1999	Silk Hope	Frannie Vaughn	TV movie
1999	Ally McBeal	Robin Jones	Episode: "Changes"
2000	Baby	Lily Malone	Television movie
2001	Jewel	Jewel Hilburn	TV movie
2001	Spin City	Judge Claire Simmons	4 episodes
2002–2003	The Guardian	Mary Gressler	4 episodes Nominated – Emmy Award for Outstanding Guest Actress – Drama Series
2003	Hollywood Wives: The New Generation	Lissa Roman	TV movie
2004	Intimate Portrait	Herself	
2005	Chasing Farrah	Herself	7 episodes
2006	Comedy Central Roast	Herself	Roastee: William Shatner
2009	Farrah's Story	Herself	Also Executive producer Nominated – Emmy Award for Outstanding Non-fiction Special

== Plays ==
Year	Title	Role	Notes
1980	Butterflies are Free	Jill Tanner	Written by Leonard Gershe. Staged at the Burt Reynolds Dinner Theater in Jupiter, Florida.
1982–1983	Extremities	Marjorie	Written by William Mastrosimone. Off-Broadway production of the controversial play.
2003	Bobbi Boland	Bobbi Boland	Written by Nancy Hasty. The play ultimately never opened.
