= Nancy Valen =

American actress and television producer (born 1965)

- Born: December 14, 1965 (age 60)
- Occupations: Actress; television producer; host
- Years active: 1985–present
- Known for: The Heavenly Kid; Loverboy; Perry Mason: The Case of the Fatal Framing; Ryan's Hope; Baywatch

Nancy Valen (born December 14, 1965) is an American actress and television producer. She is best known for portraying Captain Samantha Thomas on Baywatch and Melissa in The Heavenly Kid (1985).

== Career ==
=== Acting ===
Valen made her film debut in Porky's Revenge (1985), followed by a role in The Heavenly Kid with Richard Mulligan and Jane Kaczmarek. In 1989, Valen co-starred alongside Patrick Dempsey in the film, Loverboy. She also had a small role opposite Kirk Cameron in the film Listen to Me. Her other film appearances include Seven Sundays alongside Molly Ringwald; directed by Academy Award-winning director, Jean-Charles Tacchella.

In addition to films, Valen has also appeared in various television series. In 1990, she guest starred in an episode of Saved by the Bell as the brand new school nurse at Bayside High, Jennifer. Before Valen was cast as Nurse Jennifer, supermodel Kathy Ireland was going to play the part. Ireland was however ultimately fired during rehearsals after a disappointing table read and a similarly disappointing dress rehearsal. "She must have dazzled us in the office, because I hired her on the spot," recalled co-creator Peter Engel. Engel soon called Ireland's manager to inform him that she would not be playing the part.

That same year, she co-starred in NBC's short-lived musical series Hull High under the direction of Kenny Ortega. After the series premiere, TV Guide proclaimed her "the most agreeably watchable new star on TV". Valen has also guest starred on 23 series including Hardball, CSI: Crime Scene Investigation, Friends, Spin City, Boy Meets World, Full House, Charles in Charge, Miami Vice, Silk Stalkings, and Murder She Wrote.

Valen has also hosted several infomercials for the Bun and Thigh Roller, Slam Man, Thin 'n Sexy Body Wrap, Kevin Trudeau's Debt Cures "They" Don't Want You To Know About, Time Life The Heart of Classic Rock, and the Instyler. Valen has also starred in commercials for John Deere and Washington Mutual

Valen has appeared as a guest on Leno, The Oprah Winfrey Show, Good Day L.A. and on the covers and pages of magazines and newspapers including American Women, FHM, Cosmopolitan, Entertainment Weekly, and The Los Angeles Times Calendar.

=== Producing ===
Valen, alongside Craig J. Nevius, formed Windmill Entertainment. Among the television programs she has produced include Living in TV Land, Chasing Farrah, William Shatner in Concert, and Let's Kill Scott Baio.

As an Executive Producer/reality series creator, Valen has partnered with a wide variety of companies including Whoop Inc., Renegade83, 44 Blue, Target, and Intuitive Entertainment. Valen later partnered with Authentic Entertainment on the series WHEN STAMIE MET TRACY. The series follows two former The Real L Word stars as they raise their three children with their extended modern family. In addition, Valen works with Jarrett Creative Group in partnership with the Biography Channel for the networks' highest rated series, Celebrity Ghost Stories and the hit series, Celebrity Close Calls.

In the scripted world, Valen has partnered with VH1, ABC, FOX Television and Emmy award winning producer, Tony To. Valen is in development and is a Co-Executive Producer on ACTION HEROES INC. for ABC/Fox Studios. The action-comedy movie franchise stars William Shatner, Robert Wagner and Lee Majors as three former TV heroes turned real life detectives.

== Filmography ==
=== Film ===
Year	Title	Role	Notes
1985	Porky's Revenge!	Ginger	
1985	The Heavenly Kid	Melissa	
1989	The Big Picture	Young Sharon	
1989	Loverboy	Jenny Gordon	
1989	Listen to Me	Mia	
1992	Final Embrace	Candy Vale / Laurel Parrish	
1993	Little Devils: The Birth	Lynn	
1994	Seven Sundays	Nicky	
1998	Black Thunder	Mela	
2003	Written in Blood	Mary Ramson	
2007	The Wager	Tanya Steele	
2018	Plagi Breslau	Alicja Drewniak	
2020	Middleton Christmas	Dr. Knowles	

=== Television ===
Year	Title	Role	Notes
1985	Miami Vice	Lana	Episode: "The Home Invaders"
1986–1987	Ryan's Hope	Melinda Weaver	
1988	Charles in Charge	Tammy	Episode: "Barbelles"
1989	Murder, She Wrote	Selina Williams Waverly	Episode: "Night of the Tarantula"
1989	Baywatch	Hallie	Episode: "Panic at Malibu Pier"
1990	Hull High	Donna Breedlove	Main role (8 episodes)
1990	Saved by the Bell	Jennifer	Episode: "From Nurse to Worse"
1991	The Young Riders	Samantha Edgars	Episode: "Color Blind"
1991	Full House	Lisa Green	Episode: "Take My Sister, Please"
1992	Murder, She Wrote	Lily Roland	Episode: "Danse Diabolique"
1992	Perry Mason: The Case of the Fatal Framing	Mala Sikorski	TV film
1993	Silk Stalkings	Sylvia DeCastro	Episode: "Team Spirit"
1994	Silk Stalkings	Dr. Jillian Dupree	Episodes: "Natural Selection: Parts 1 & 2"
1994	Fortune Hunter	Madison Reynolds	Episode: "The Cursed Dagger"
1994	Walker, Texas Ranger	Laura	Episodes: "Something in the Shadows: Parts 1 & 2"
1994	Hardball	Jennifer	Episode: "Pilot"
1994	Boy Meets World	Ms. Kelly	Episode: "Pairing Off"
1995	Friends	Lorraine	Episode: "The One with the Candy Hearts"
1996–1997	Baywatch	Samantha Thomas	Main role (22 episodes)
1997	Viper	Bianca Carson	Episode: "Whistle Blower"
1998	Dune 2000	Fremen Kari (voice)	Video game
1999	The Love Boat: The Next Wave	Leslie	Episode: "Other People's Business"
2001	Black Scorpion	Det. Angela Archer / Angel of Death	Episode: "Kiss of Death"
2002	Spin City	Ashley	Episode: "Sex, Lies and Video Date"
2018	9-1-1	Natalie Gainey	Episode: "Dosed"
2019	Playing with Fire	Martina Gaiani	Episode: "Fabrizio Juega Con Fuego - Fabrizio Plays With Fire"; Episode: "El Terror De Camila - Camilla's Terror"; Episode: "Fabrizio el Insaciable - Fabrizio the Insatiable"; Episode: "Fabrizio Tienta al Diablo - Fabrizio Tempts the Devil"; Episode: "Jorge Sabe que lo Traicionan - Jorge Knows the Betray"; Episode: "El Plan Macabro de Jorge - Jorge's Macabre Plan"; Episode: "A la Caza de Fabrizio"; Episode: "Dolorosa Realidad"
