= Joan Severance =

American model and actress

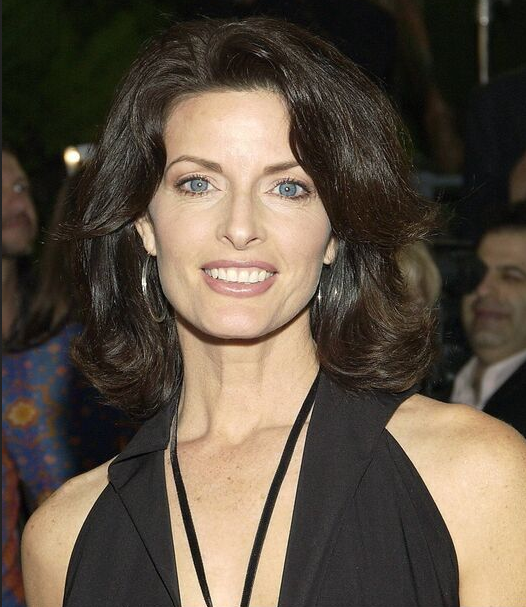
- Born: Joan Marie Severance; December 23, 1958 (age 67); Houston, Texas, U.S.
- Occupations: Actress, fashion model
- Years active: 1979–present
- Spouse: Eric Milan (m. 1977; div. 1984)
- Website: www.joanseverance.com

Joan Marie Severance (born December 23, 1958) is an American actress and former fashion model. After a modeling career in the 1970s and '80s she turned to acting, with prominent roles in the comedy film See No Evil, Hear No Evil (1989) and the low-budget action film Black Scorpion (1995). She twice appeared in pictorials in Playboy magazine.

== Early life ==
Severance was born in Houston, Texas. Her father was an IBM systems manager who had to move frequently around the world. "By the time I was 11," said Severance, "we'd lived in 12 different places." She and her family also lived in Libya, but in 1967 had to flee the country because of the Six-Day War. They left the Middle East and returned to the United States, settling in Houston.

Severance attended Westbury High School, and at age 15, started modeling to make money for college. Although she hoped to become a veterinarian, she could not afford the cost of tuition. After appearing in the "Miss Houston" beauty contest, she was discovered by Alan Martin, a local photographer in Houston, who introduced her to John Casablancas. Casablancas signed her up with the Elite Model Management and sent her on assignment to Paris. During this time, she met her future husband, model Eric Milan.

== Career ==
=== Modeling ===
During her time in Paris, she posed for Sportswear International, Vogue Paris, and others. Upon her return to the United States, Severance became one of America's top models, filming over 40 commercials, and earning $7,500 per day. She has also modeled for Versace, Chanel, and Armani.

Severance was also on the covers of the January 1990 and November 1992 issues of Playboy magazine, both featuring her in a nude pictorial. More recently, at age 52, she appeared in a six-page editorial along with an interview in the Spring/Summer 2011 issue of Genlux magazine.

=== Acting ===
In 1986, Severance began auditioning for acting bits at the urging of her friend Robin Leach. She made her debut in a small role in the first Lethal Weapon film in 1987. She was featured alongside Richard Pryor and Gene Wilder in the 1989 comedy See No Evil, Hear No Evil, and as Hulk Hogan's love interest, Samantha N. Moore, in the wrestling film No Holds Barred (1989). She also appeared in the Scorpions' music video for their 1988 song, "Rhythm of Love."

Her most extensive role was a villainess for an eleven-episode story arc of the TV series Wiseguy; she played Susan Profitt, half of a brother/sister crime team (the other half was played by Kevin Spacey) to great acclaim. Their partnership was reprised in See No Evil, Hear No Evil. In the early 1990s, Severance appeared as Samantha "Sam" Dooley, the Martian Belle, in two training videos for Virtual World Entertainment alongside other actors such as Cheech Marin, "Weird Al" Yankovic, R. Lee Ermey, and Judge Reinhold.

Severance often appeared in femme fatale roles in low-budget horror and murder-mystery movies, including Lake Consequence (1993), Criminal Passion (1994), and Payback (1995). She had leading roles in Roger Corman's superhero film Black Scorpion (1995) and its sequel Black Scorpion II (1997), and The Last Seduction II (1999); she also co-produced the latter two. From 1998 to 1999, Severance played Security Chief Camille Hunter on the Aaron Spelling-created television series Love Boat: The Next Wave on UPN.

In 2006, Severance appeared in MyNetworkTV telenovela Wicked Wicked Games. She was also in shows such as CSI: Miami and One Tree Hill. In 2013, she was in American Horror Story: Asylum. In 2014, she was on Celebrity Wife Swap with Leach.

== Personal life ==
Severance married fellow model Eric Milan in 1977. They separated amicably in 1984. According to Severance, they "just grew apart". Severance was diagnosed with vitiligo when she was eight years old; the primary area affected by the disease is the skin around her eyes.

== Filmography ==
=== Film ===
Year	Title	Role	Notes
1987	Lethal Weapon	Girl In Black Playsuit	Uncredited
1989	See No Evil, Hear No Evil	Eve	
1989	No Holds Barred	Samantha Moore	
1989	Worth Winning	Lizbette	
1990	Bird on a Wire	Rachel Varney	
1991	The Runestone	Marla Stewart	
1991	Write to Kill	Belle Washburn	
1992	Illicit Behavior	Melissa Yarnell	
1992	Almost Pregnant	Maureen Mallory	
1994	Criminal Passion	Melanie Hudson	Direct-to-video
1995	Payback	Rose Gullerman	Direct-to-video
1995	Dangerous Indiscretion	Caroline Everett	
1995	Hard Evidence	Madelyn Turner	
1996	Profile for Murder	Dr. Hanna Carras	
1997	In Dark Places	Chapelle	
1997	Matter of Trust	Theresa Marsh	
1999	The Last Seduction II	Bridget Gregory	Direct-to-video
2001	Cause of Death	Angela Carter	
2005	Taylor	Leigh	
2006	Last Sunset	Lisa Wayne	
2007	Born	Dr. Sammael	
2012	Sharkproof	Connie Krebs	
2016	Accidentally Engaged	Sandy Byers	
2016	Becker's Farm	Mrs. Schmidt	

=== Television ===
Year	Title	Role	Notes
1979	ABC Afterschool Special	Actress Exiting Limo	Episode: "A Movie Star's Daughter"
1987	Mike Hammer	Pauline	Episode: "Lady Killer"
1988	Wiseguy	Susan Profitt	9 episodes
1988	Max Headroom	Zik-Zak Hallucination Girl	Episode: "Neurostim"
1989	Murphy's Law	Alex Kovac	Episode: "All's Wrong That Ends Wrong"
1989	The Hitchhiker	Jane Ambergris / Holly May Stillman	Episode: "My Enemy"
1991	Another Pair of Aces: Three of a Kind	Susan Davis	Television film
1991	Midnight Caller	Norma Cheever	Episode: "Uninvited Guests"
1991	Good Sports	Randi	Episode: "The Moody Blues Swing"
1992	Red Shoe Diaries	The Woman	Episode: "Safe Sex"
1992	Tales from the Crypt	Rona	Episode: "The New Arrival"
1993	Lake Consequence	Irene	Television film
1993	Johnny Bago	Reno Hubbertston	Episode: "Lady Madonna"
1993	L.A. Law	Lauren Chase	Episodes: "How Much Is That Bentley in the Window" and "Foreign Co-respondent"
1995	Black Scorpion	Darcy Walker / Black Scorpion	Television film
1996	Frequent Flyer	Alison Rawlings	Television film
1997	Black Scorpion II	Darcy Walker / Black Scorpion	Television film
1997	Profiler	Christine Logan	Episodes: "Venom: Part 1" and "Venom: Part 2"
1998	Life of the Party: The Pamela Harriman Story	Paley	Television film
1998–1999	Love Boat: The Next Wave	Security Chief Camille Hunter	23 episodes
2003	Mystery Woman	Mary Stenning	Television film
2003	She Spies	Lauren Drake	Episode: "Love Kills"
2004	One Tree Hill	Cynthia Price	Episodes: "I Shall Believe" and "Suddenly Everything Has Changed"
2005	CSI: Miami	Sophie Townsend	Episode: "Money Plane"
2006–2007	Wicked Wicked Games	Anna Whitman	9 episodes
2013	American Horror Story: Asylum	Marion	Episode: "Madness Ends"
2013	Masters of Sex	Leona	Episodes: "Brave New World" and "Fallout"
2016	NCIS: Los Angeles	Mary Reynolds	Episode: "Glasnost"
