= Seven Sundays (1994 film) =

- Directed by: Jean-Charles Tacchella
- Cinematography: Martial Thury
- Music by: Raymond Alessandrini
- Release date: 1994
- Countries: France; Italy
- Language: French

Seven Sundays (French: Tous les jours dimanche, Italian: Tutti i giorni è domenica) is a 1994 French-Italian comedy film directed by Jean-Charles Tacchella.

== Plot ==
Dodo is a hedonistic French man living in Florida, with friend Betty suddenly disappearing, having run off with a gypsy's bride, forcing Dodo to change his life.

== Cast ==
- Thierry Lhermitte: Dodo Martin
- Maurizio Nichetti: Jesus
- Rod Steiger: Benjamin
- Marie-France Pisier: Marion
- Susan Blakely: Alice
- Molly Ringwald: Janet
- Nancy Valen: Nicky
- Monique Mannen: Gloria
- Peggy O'Neal: Geraldine
- Jack G. Spirtos: Quinquina
- Suzanne Turner: Celia
