= Chasing Farrah =

2005 American reality television series

- Genre: Reality television
- Directed by: Craig Nevius
- Starring: Farrah Fawcett
- Composer: David G. Russell
- Country of origin: United States
- Original language: English
- No. of seasons: 1
- No. of episodes: 7

Production
- Executive producers: Craig Nevius; Sal Maniaci; Marta M. Mobley
- Producers: Nancy Valen; Kathryn Riccio
- Editor: Cameron Spencer
- Running time: 30 minutes

Original release
- Network: TV Land
- Release: March 23 – April 27, 2005

Chasing Farrah is an American reality television series starring Farrah Fawcett that aired on TV Land in 2005.

== Synopsis ==
The series followed actress Farrah Fawcett in her day-to-day life.

== Episodes ==
No.	Title	Original release date	Prod. code
1	"My Dinner with Farrah"	March 23, 2005	101
2	"Lights, Camera, Farrah?"	March 23, 2005	102
3	"Tonight's Guest: Farrah Fawcett"	March 30, 2005	103
4	"Fun with Farrah"	April 6, 2005	104
5	"Meet the Fawcetts"	April 13, 2005	105
6	"Still Farrah After All These Years"	April 20, 2005	106
7	"The Art of Being Farrah"	April 27, 2005	107

== Reception ==
Scott D. Pierce of Deseret News wrote, "Chasing Farrah is worth watching for at least one reason — it gives viewers a clue how celebrities can be so out of touch with reality. We get a glimpse of fans and flunkies fawning all over Fawcett, telling her how great she is all the time." The Fort Worth Star-Telegram television critic Robert Philpot gave the show a grade of C, stating, "Fawcett is likable enough, but she's unusually tame for this sort of fare. In this genre, you need something outrageous to be worthy of sticking around."

The Star-Ledger's Matt Zoller Seitz said, "Rather than ignore the manipulations of so-called reality programming, Chasing Farrah folds them into the show. That's not enough to cancel out the familiarity of the show's concept, but it's intriguing all the same." Steve Murray of The Atlanta Journal-Constitution gave the show a D, stating, "The producers even make a point about the aptness of the title: Even they don't seem to know why they're chasing Farrah, or, for that matter, who Farrah really is. The giggly, blonde-maned icon doesn't help them out much. It's like there's no there there worth chasing."
