= Michelle Lintel =

American actress (born 1969)

Michelle Lintel (born August 14, 1969) is an American actress and martial artist known for playing the lead role in the 2001 television series Black Scorpion.

== Filmography ==
- 1999 On Common Ground
- 1999 Diagnosis: Murder - "Blood Ties"
- 2000 Sacrifice (TV) (as Michele Lintel) as FBI Agent Hildebrandt
- 2001 Black Scorpion Detective Darcy Walker / Black Scorpion
- 2001 Black Scorpion Returns as Detective Darcy Walker / Black Scorpion
- 2001 The X Show Herself (1 episode)
- 2002 Sting of the Black Scorpion as Detective Darcy Walker / Black Scorpion
- 2008 The Ex List as Nurse (1 episode)
- 2008 Battle Planet as General Shaba
