= Police motorcycle =

Motorcycle used by police

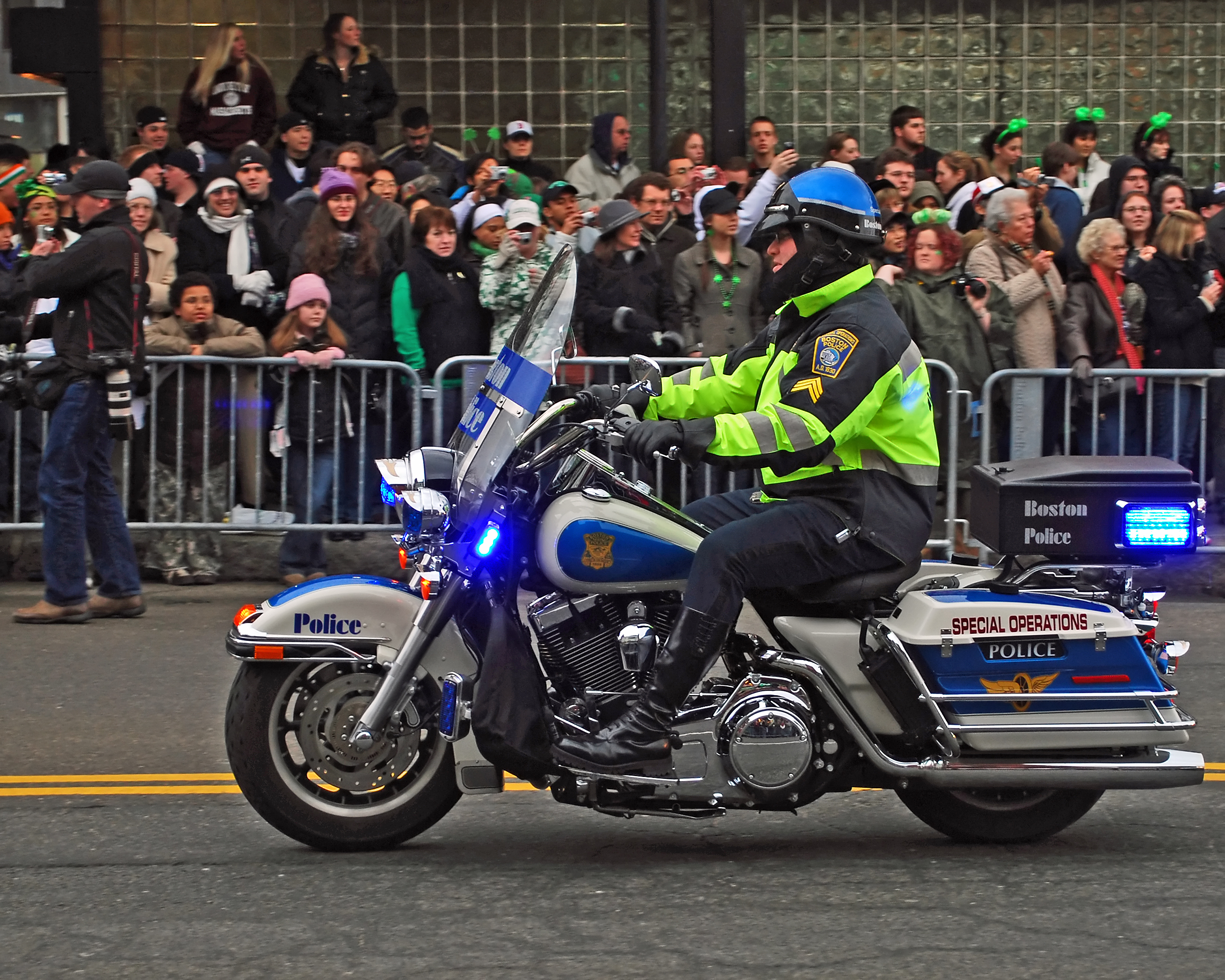
A Harley-Davidson FLHP used by the Boston Police Department

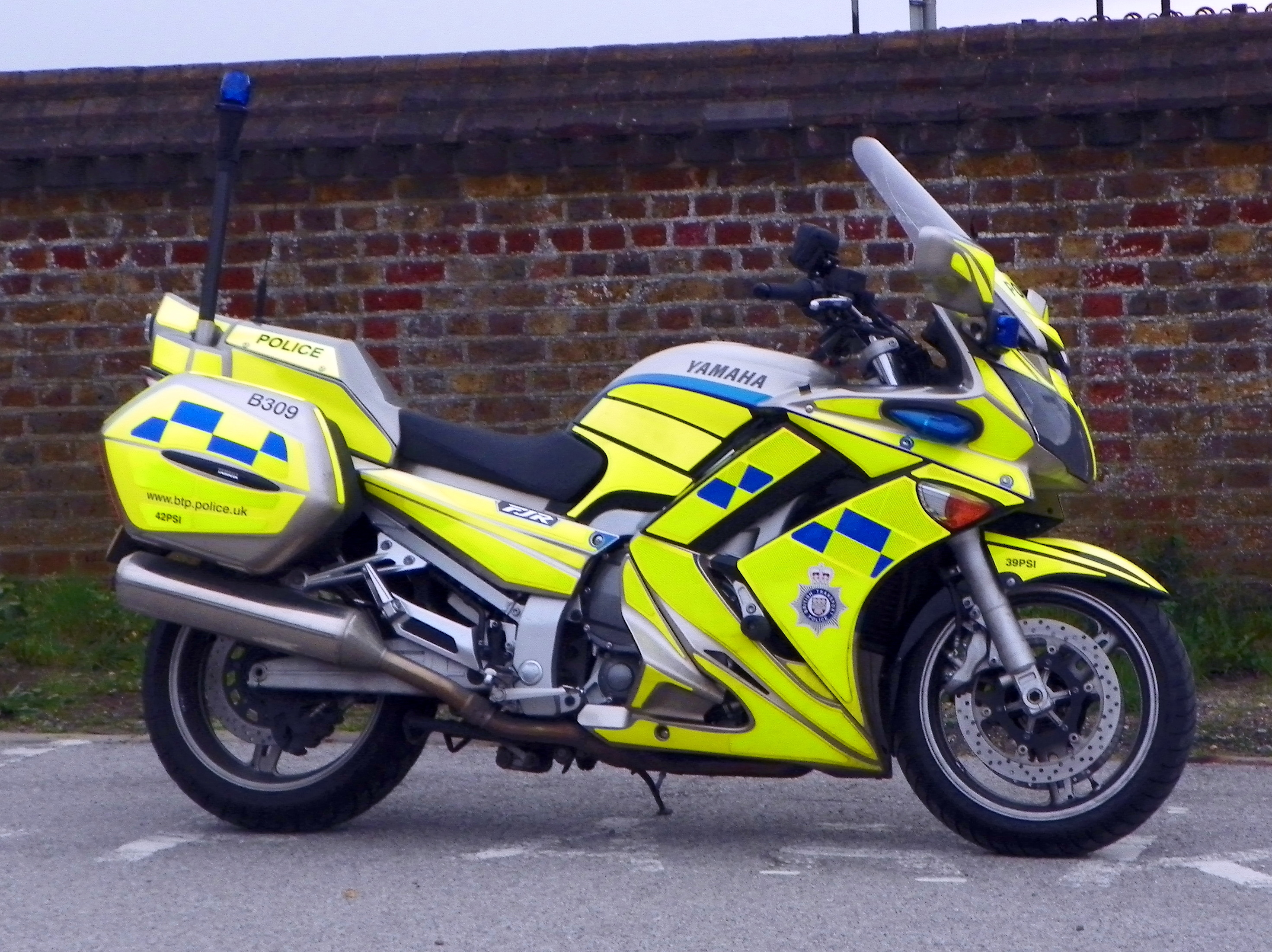
A Yamaha FJR1300 used by the British Transport Police

A police motorcycle is a motorcycle used by police and law enforcement. They may be custom designed to meet the requirements unique of a particular use. Units that use motorcycles are often called motorcycle units or motor units, and the specially trained police officers assigned to these units are known as motorcycle officers, motorcycle cops or motor officers.

The maneuverability of the motorcycle on crowded streets offer advantages not provided by larger, more traditional police vehicles. The motorcycle's relatively small size allows it to get to accident scenes more quickly when incidents such as traffic collisions slow down access by four-wheel vehicles, and to access routes unavailable to other motor vehicles, such as narrow streets and footpaths. Police motorcycles are also used in police escorts, funeral processions, motorcades, marathons, and other events due to their ability to easily leapfrog ahead and block traffic for the main body.

== History ==
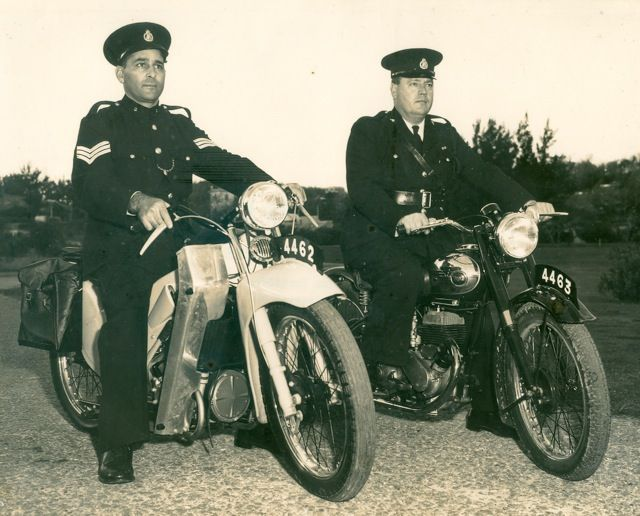
Bermuda Police Service officers on Velocette and BSA motorcycles in 1953

Police officers have used motorcycles—primarily for the enforcement of traffic laws and as escort vehicles—since the early 20th century. The Los Angeles Police Department celebrated the 100th anniversary of the formation of its motorcycle "Speed Squad", formally established in 1909, and the Berkeley Police Department officially organized its police motorcycle patrol in 1911. However, several police forces around the country reported using motorcycles unofficially as patrol vehicles earlier. Harley-Davidson credits Detroit, Michigan as being the first purchaser of police motorcycles in 1908. and the Portland Police Bureau had a police officer who used his personal motorcycle to patrol the city as early as 1909. The LAPD also recognized the 100th anniversary of the death of Officer Walter R. Kreps, the first motorcycle officer reported to have died in the line of duty in 1916.

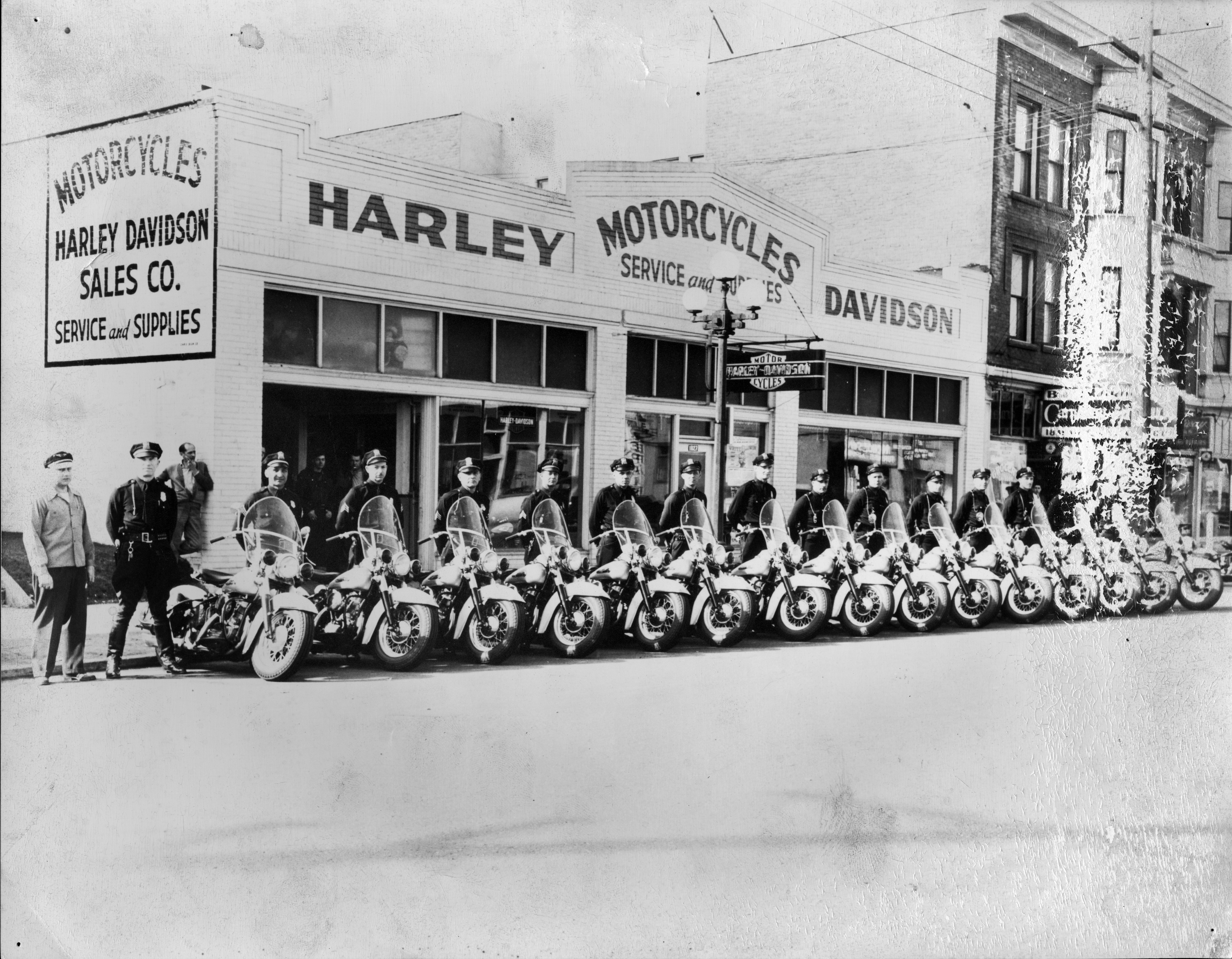
The Seattle Police Department's motorcycle fleet outside a Harley-Davidson dealership in 1940

The role of the motorcycle as inexpensive public transportation evolved in the 1930s, and their use by police and the armed forces also grew, providing a stable production market for the more utilitarian machines, especially as Europe rearmed after World War I.

The American television show CHiPs, running from 1977 through 1983, popularized police motorcycles in general, and specifically the Kawasaki police motorcycles as the iconic police bike of the late 20th century through their depiction of two California Highway Patrol motor officers responding to various crimes and traffic incidents around Los Angeles.

== Motorcycles used ==
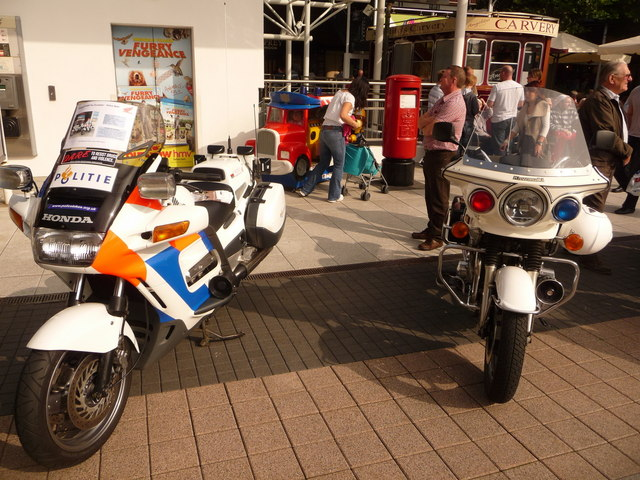
Hampshire and Isle of Wight Constabulary motorcycles on display in Portsmouth, England

As of 2004 police departments in the United States typically use purpose-built motorcycles marketed by BMW Motorrad, Harley-Davidson, Honda, and Kawasaki. The popular 80s-era Kawasaki KZ models benefited from reliability issues with the AMF era Harleys and Kawasaki's opening of their Lincoln, Nebraska factory to build KZs in 1974, enjoying an over 30 year run from their introduction in 1973 to the last model built in September 2005.

In the United Kingdom, the most common police motorcycles are the BMW R1200RT and the Yamaha FJR1300. Some police forces also use scooters within towns for parking enforcement, or special-purpose machines such as unmarked (covert), or off-road motorcycles.

Of the British manufacturers themselves, Triumph motorcycles, built at Meriden, were used by many British (including the Metropolitan Police) and Commonwealth police forces until 1983 when the factory closed. From the late 1940s, Triumph was also, for a time, the choice of the Parisian police, a fact promoted in a factory-produced movie, It's A Triumph !. The police version of the 650cc 6T Triumph Thunderbird was nicknamed the SAINT, an acronym of "Stops Anything In No Time". By the mid-1970s, with industrial problems and closures affecting their spares supply and service, Triumphs and other British marques were increasingly replaced by the smoother BMW R80 (and to a more limited extent, Norton Interpols) than by then-current Triumph police bikes. In an attempt to win back orders from BMW, Meriden marketed Triumph Bonneville and Tiger models of 750cc size with anti-vibration mountings as well as electric starting but these still only achieved limited sales success. In 1981, the UK newspaper, Motor Cycle News reported Derbyshire's Chief Constable comparing these Triumphs very unfavorably to BMW, in particular, its anti-vibration engine mounts. Supported by an article in rival publication, Motor Cycle Weekly, this criticism was strongly refuted by the factory and Derbyshire eventually accepted evaluation of police versions of the new Triumph T140W TSS in anti-vibration mounts. Norton's Commando Interpol and later Wankel rotary engine Interpol 2 motorcycle were used by some British forces until that firm's collapse in the early 1990s. Other marques such as BSA were used by some forces, although only the Velocette LE "noddy-bike" model proved as popular with the police as the Triumphs.

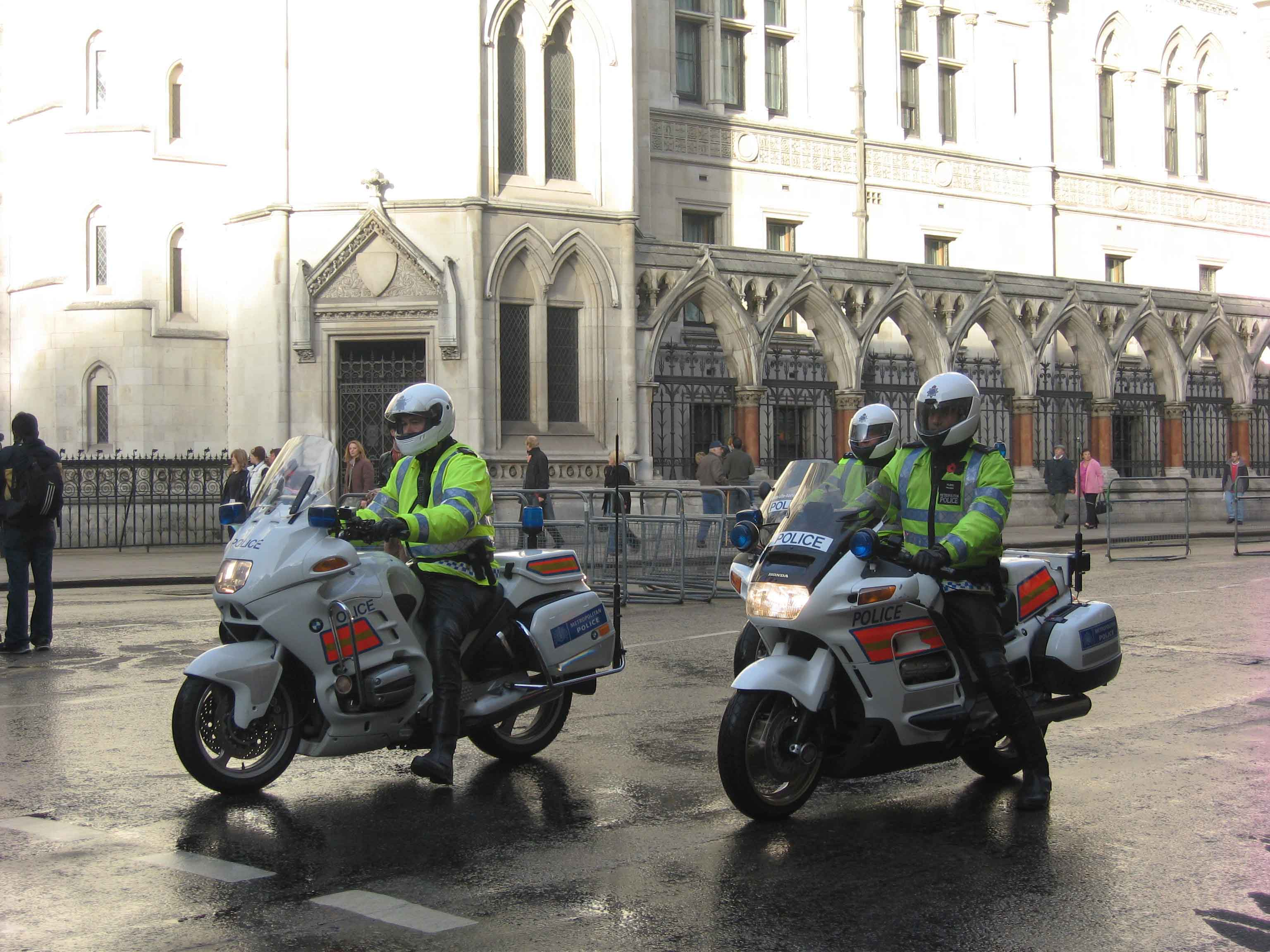
A BMW R1100 and Honda ST1100 of the Metropolitan Police Service

In 2008, BMW Motorrad claimed to be the largest seller of motorcycles for authority use worldwide, as more than 100,000 BMW motorcycles were in official use in over 150 countries on five continents including their home country of Germany. In 2007, BMW sold 4,284 police motorcycles worldwide. BMW produces factory built police-specific models such as the R1200RT-P and R900RT-P. More than 225 U.S. law enforcement agencies, including the California Highway Patrol, have BMW authority motorcycles in their fleets of patrol vehicles. The new BMW bikes outperformed the aging Harley-Davidson fleet.

Harley-Davidson has maintained a long relationship with police departments and law-enforcement agencies in some countries. For the 2009 model year, Harley-Davidson offers the Harley-Davidson FLHTP Electra Glide, the FLHP Road King, the XL883 Sportster and the new XB12XP Buell Ulysses Police motorcycle. The FLHTP Electra Glide and the FLHP Road King are also offered as Fire/Rescue motorcycles.

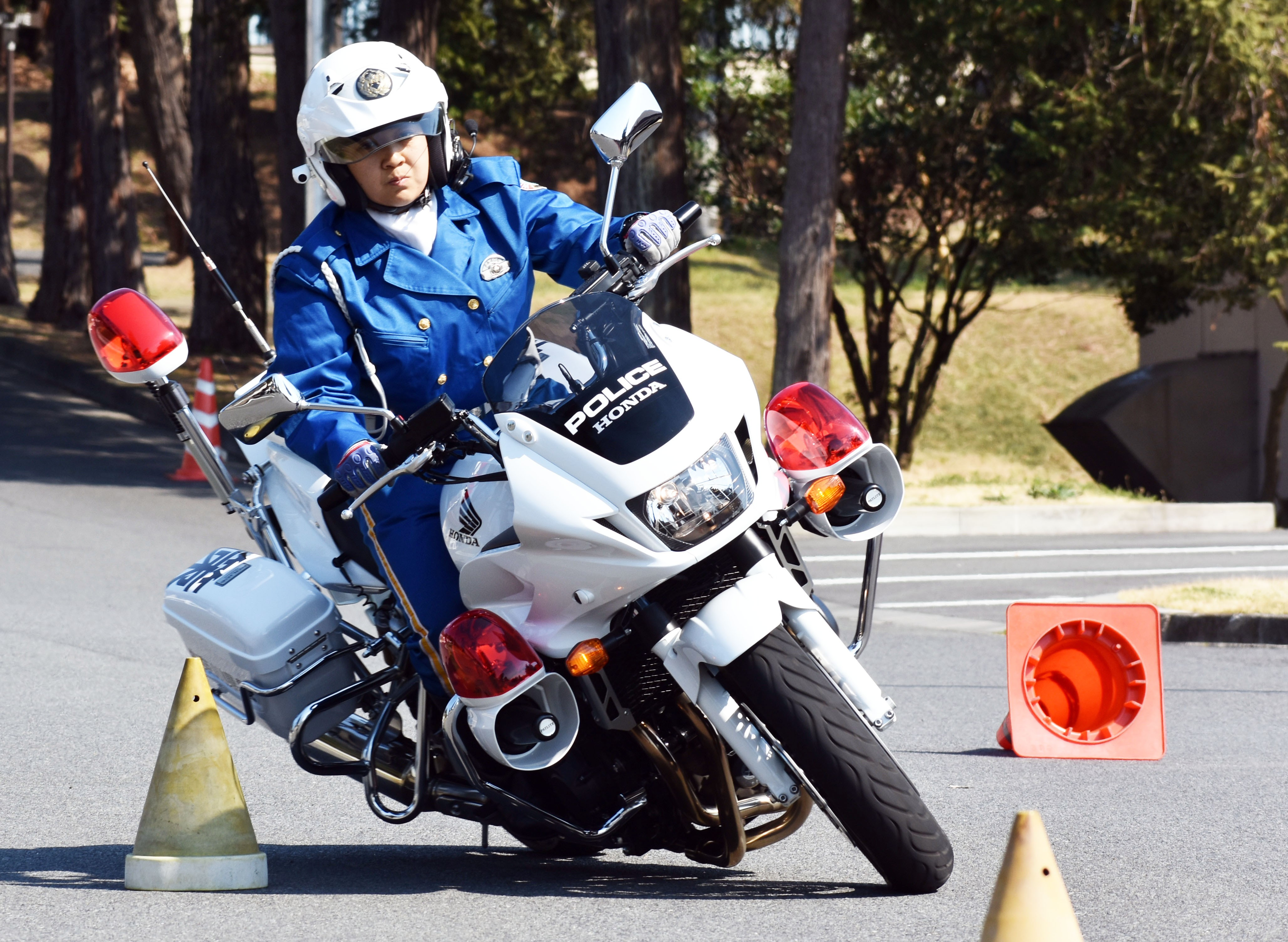
A Japanese motor officer demonstrating his Honda CB1300's capabilities

In Japan, police motorcycles are affectionately called shirobai (白バイ, "white motorcycle"), due to their predominantly all-white livery. Motorcycles were first introduced for police use by the Tokyo Metropolitan Police Department in 1918, and adopted the all-white color scheme nationally in 1936. Meguro motorcycles provided many early shirobai, along with the Honda CB series, while the Honda VFR series are popular today. Internationally, the Honda ST and Yamaha FJ series are popular options.

The Los Angeles Police Department first tested the Zero Motorcycles MMX electric motorcycle in 2014, becoming the first department to add electric bikes to its fleet. Zero has since announced that it now supplies over 100 agencies with several colleges and university agencies using them as their primary vehicle. The motorcycle was praised over the traditional bulky Harley-Davidson and BMW bikes for its stealth, low operational costs, immediate tactical advantage, and low environmental footprint.

== Gallery ==
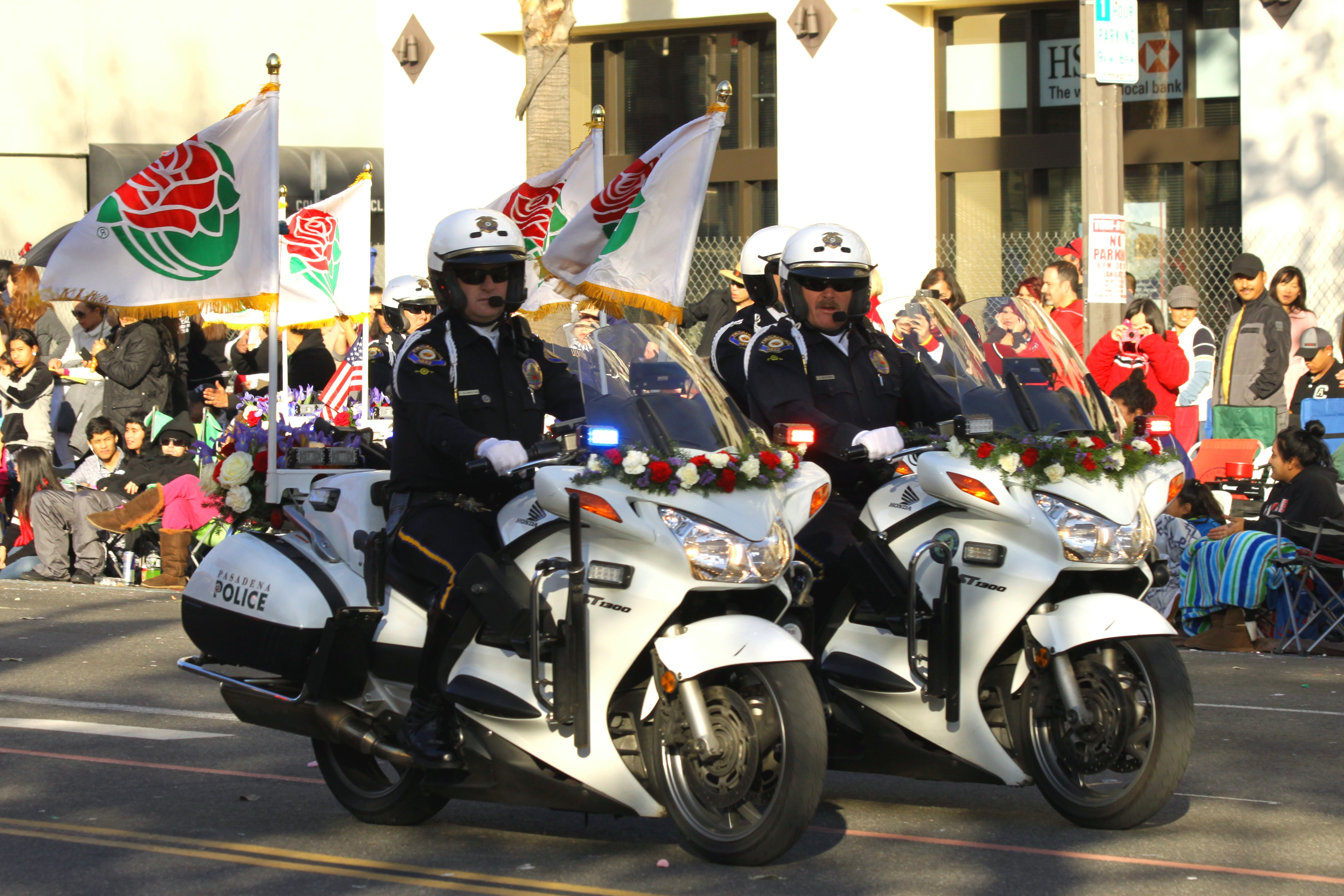
Pasadena motor officers on Honda ST 1300 bikes during the Rose Parade

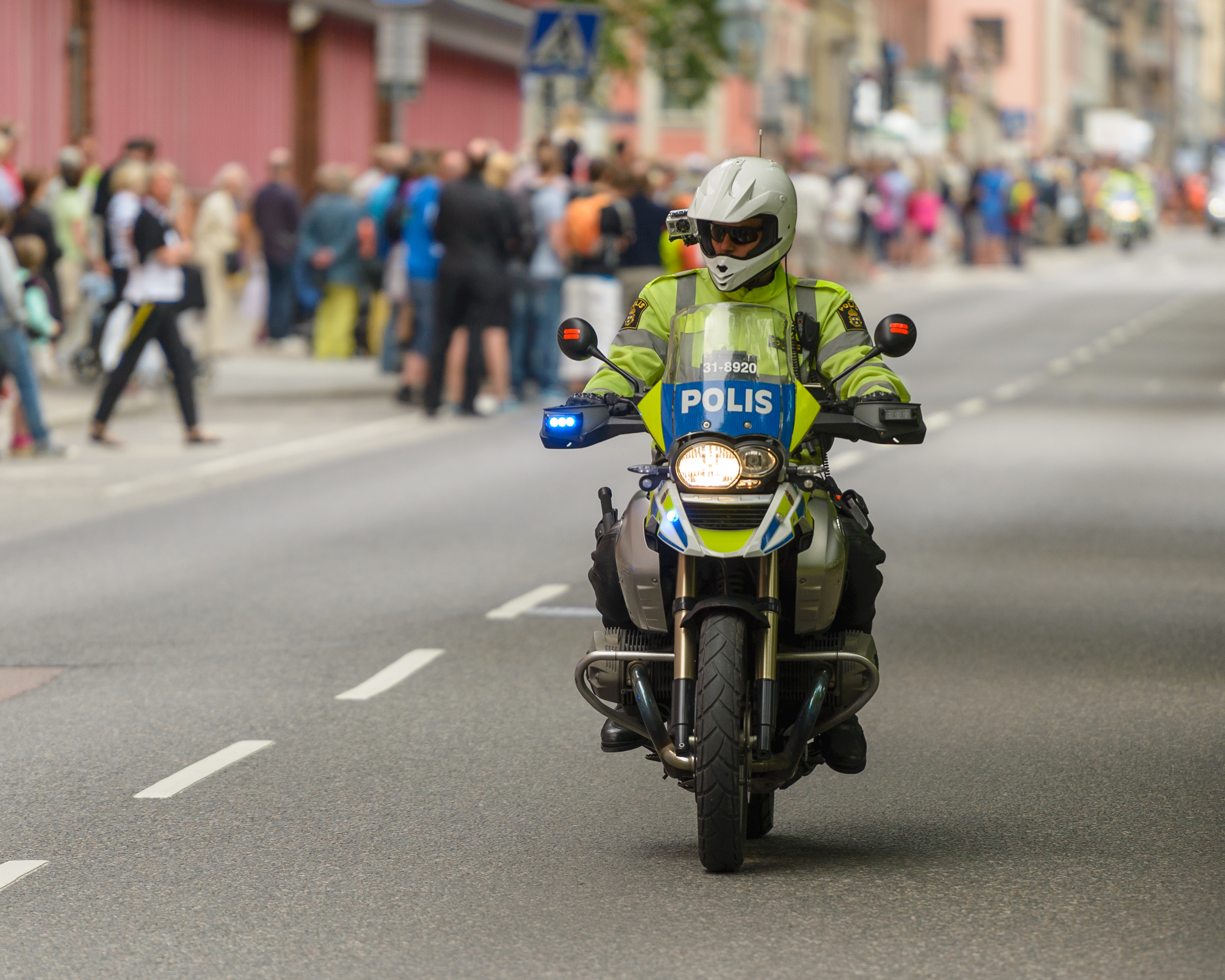
Stockholm Police on a BMW R1250GS

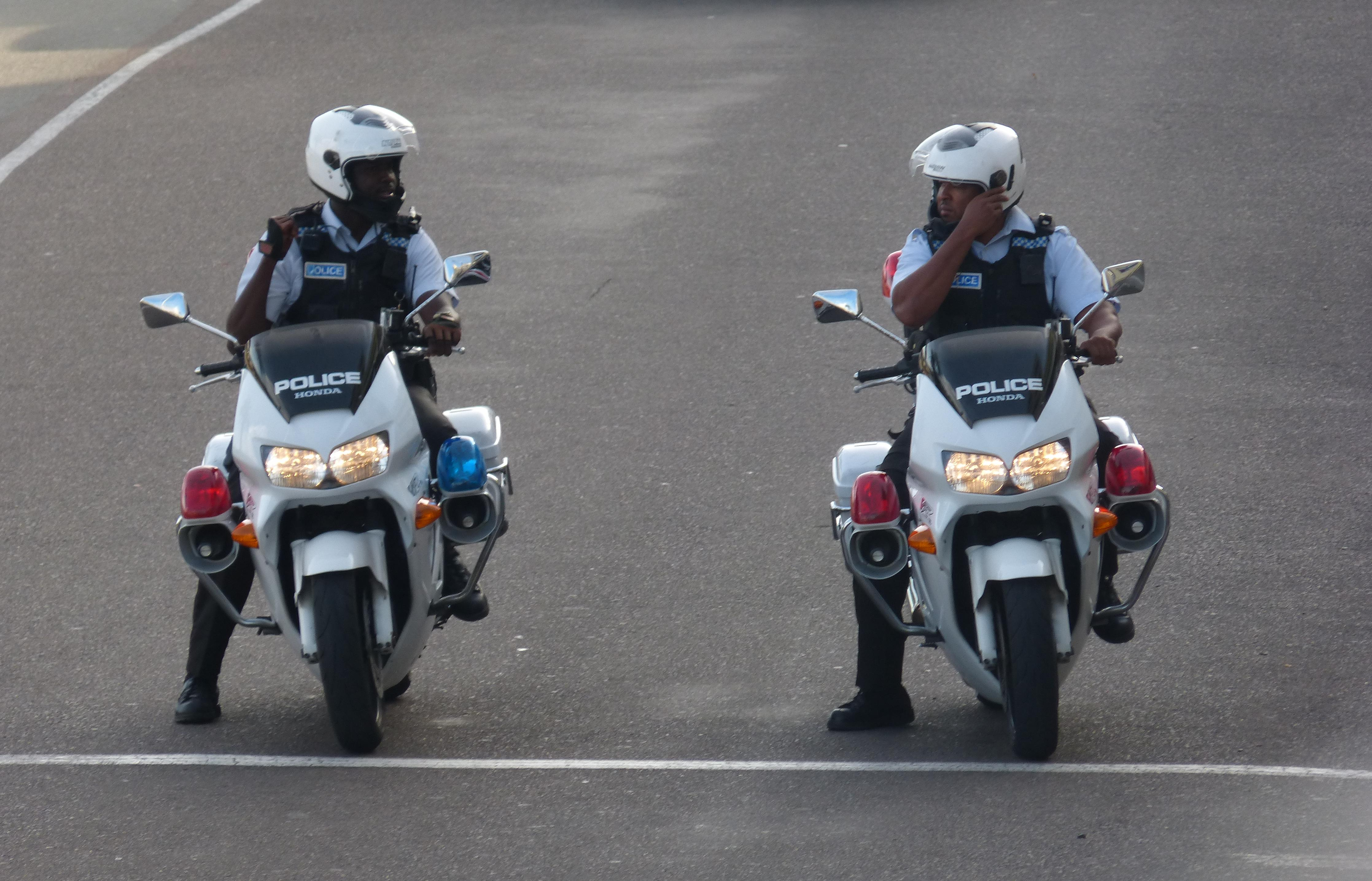
Bermuda Police motorcycle officers on Honda VFRs

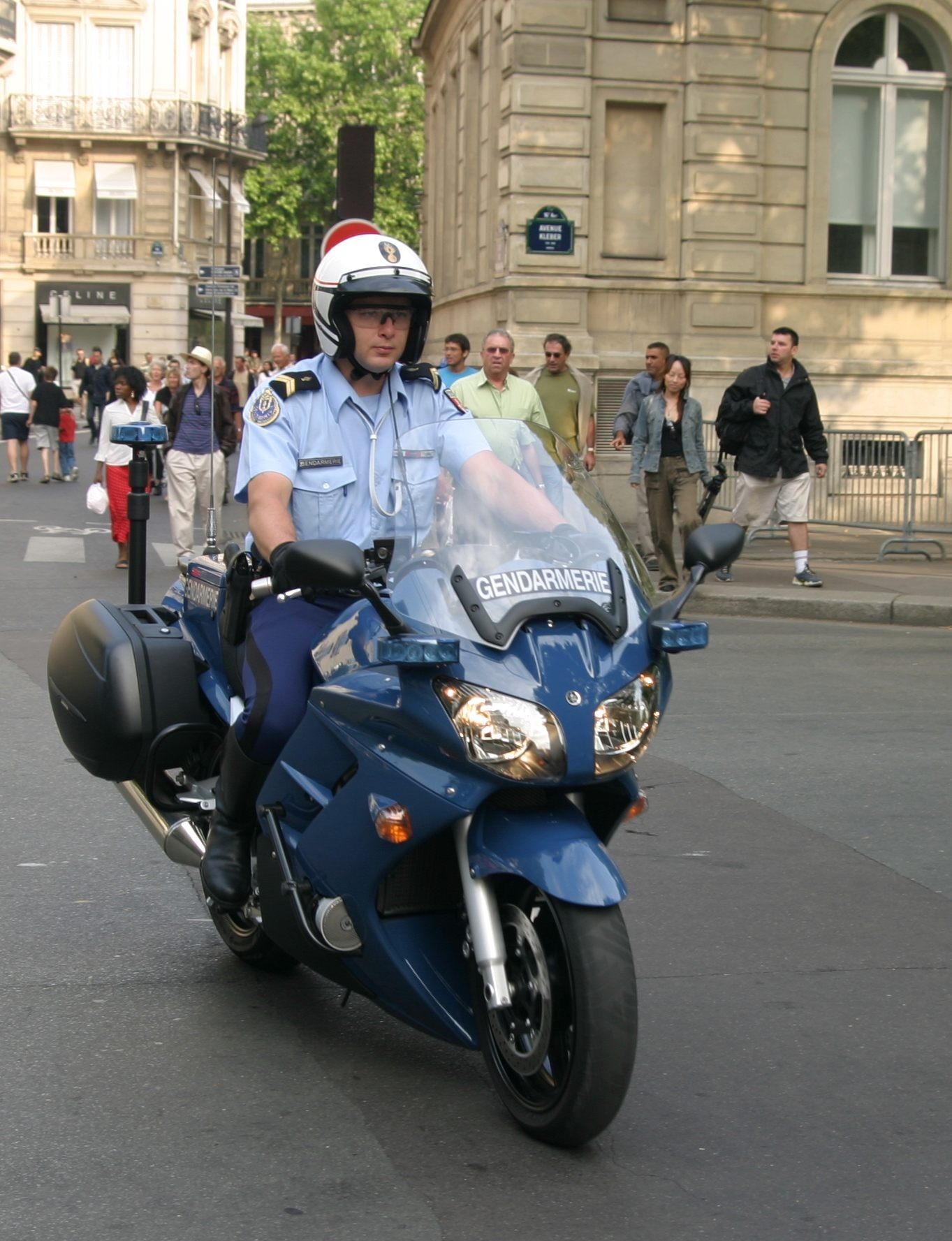
A French gendarme on a Yamaha FJR1300 in Paris

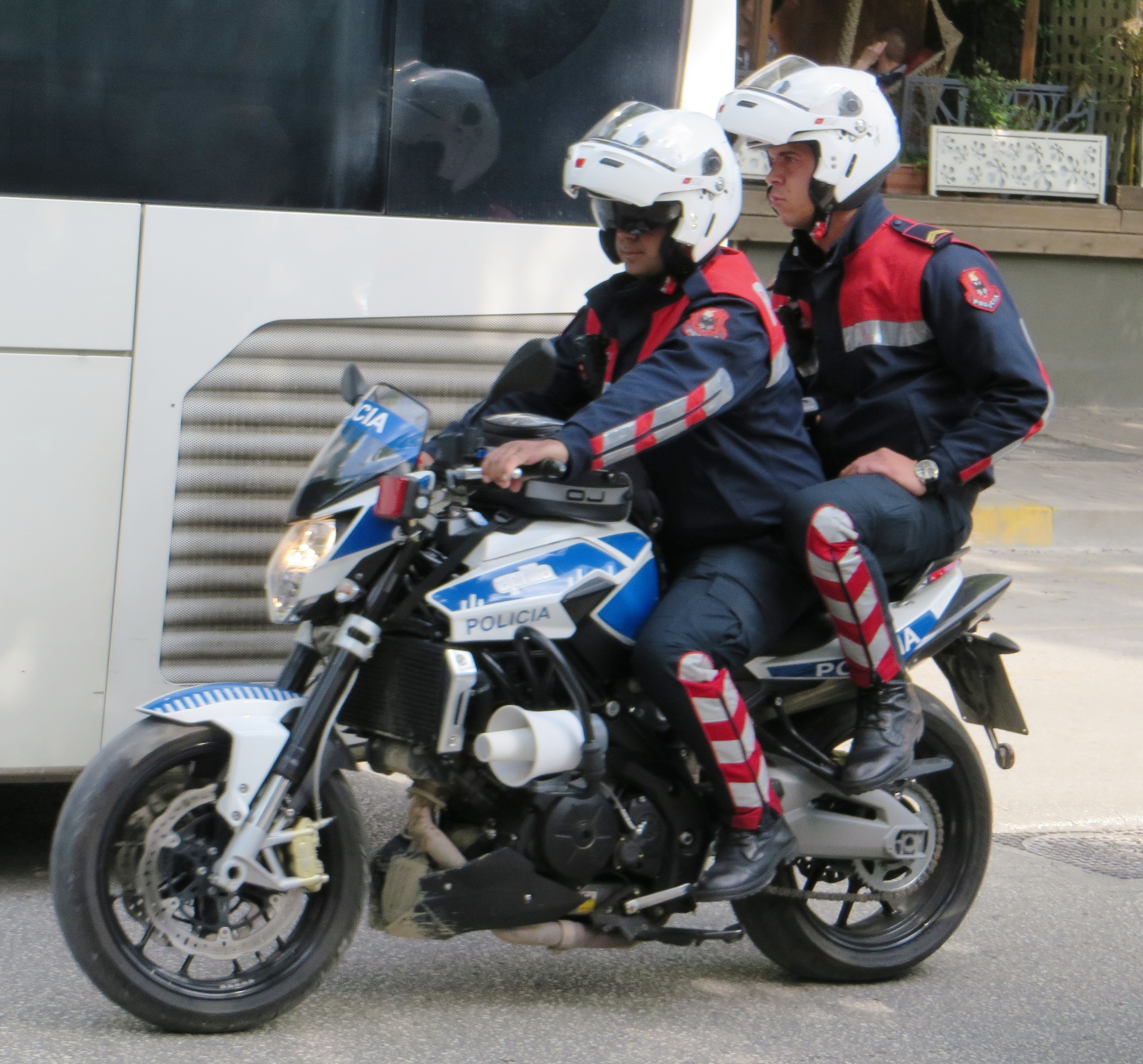
Albanian officers double up on a Aprilia 750 Shiver

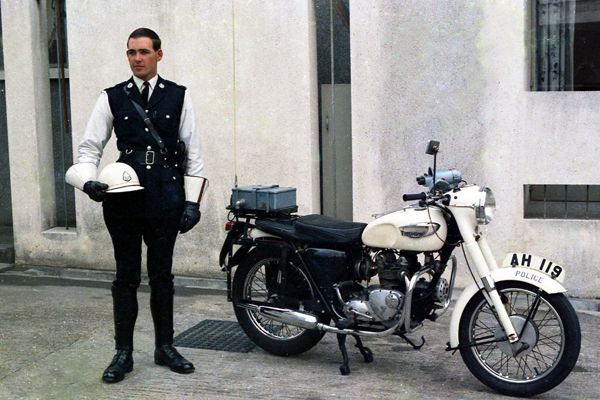
Hong Kong Police Force motor officer with a Triumph 3TA in 1967

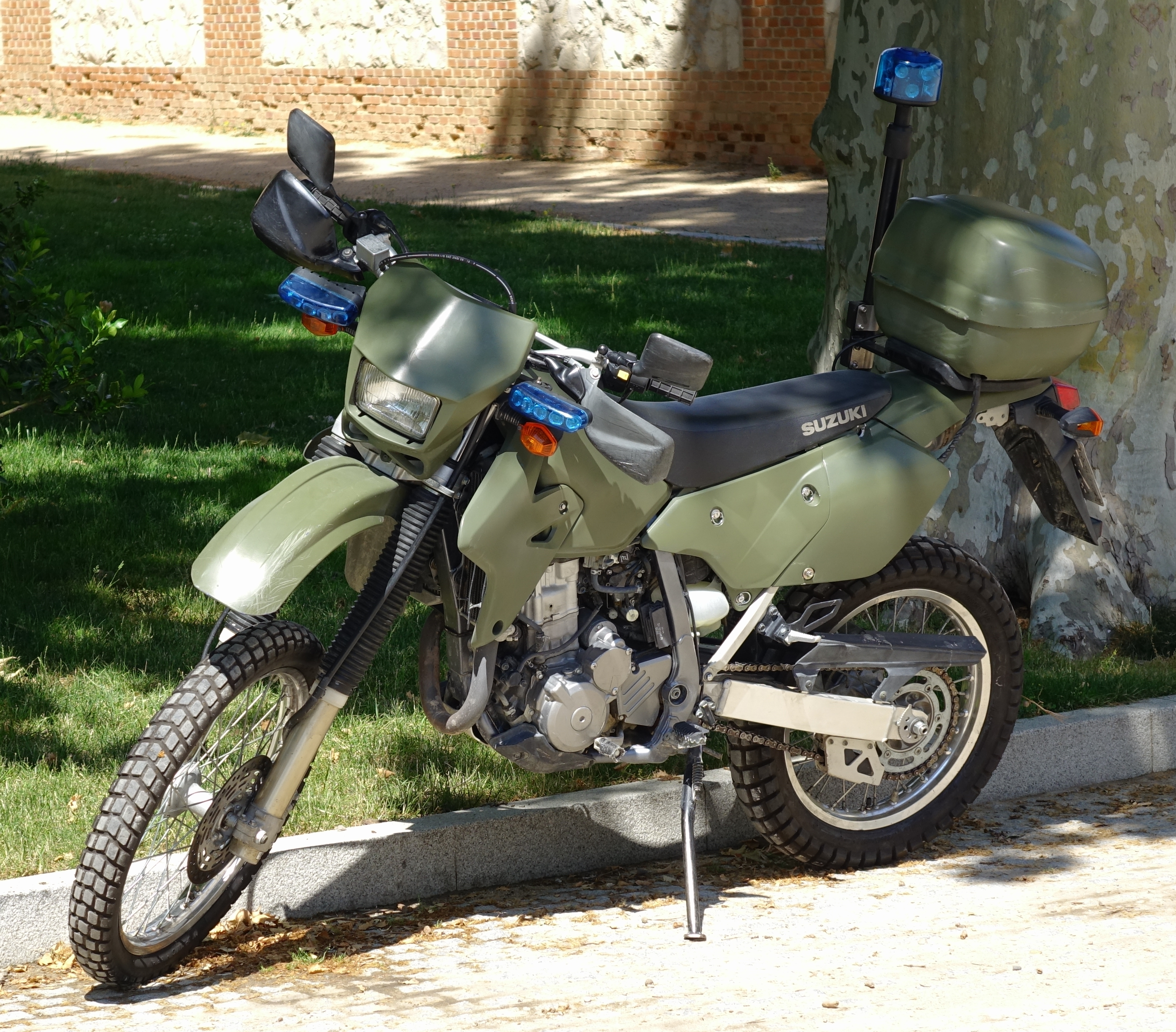
Suzuki DRZ-400S used by the Spanish Army military police

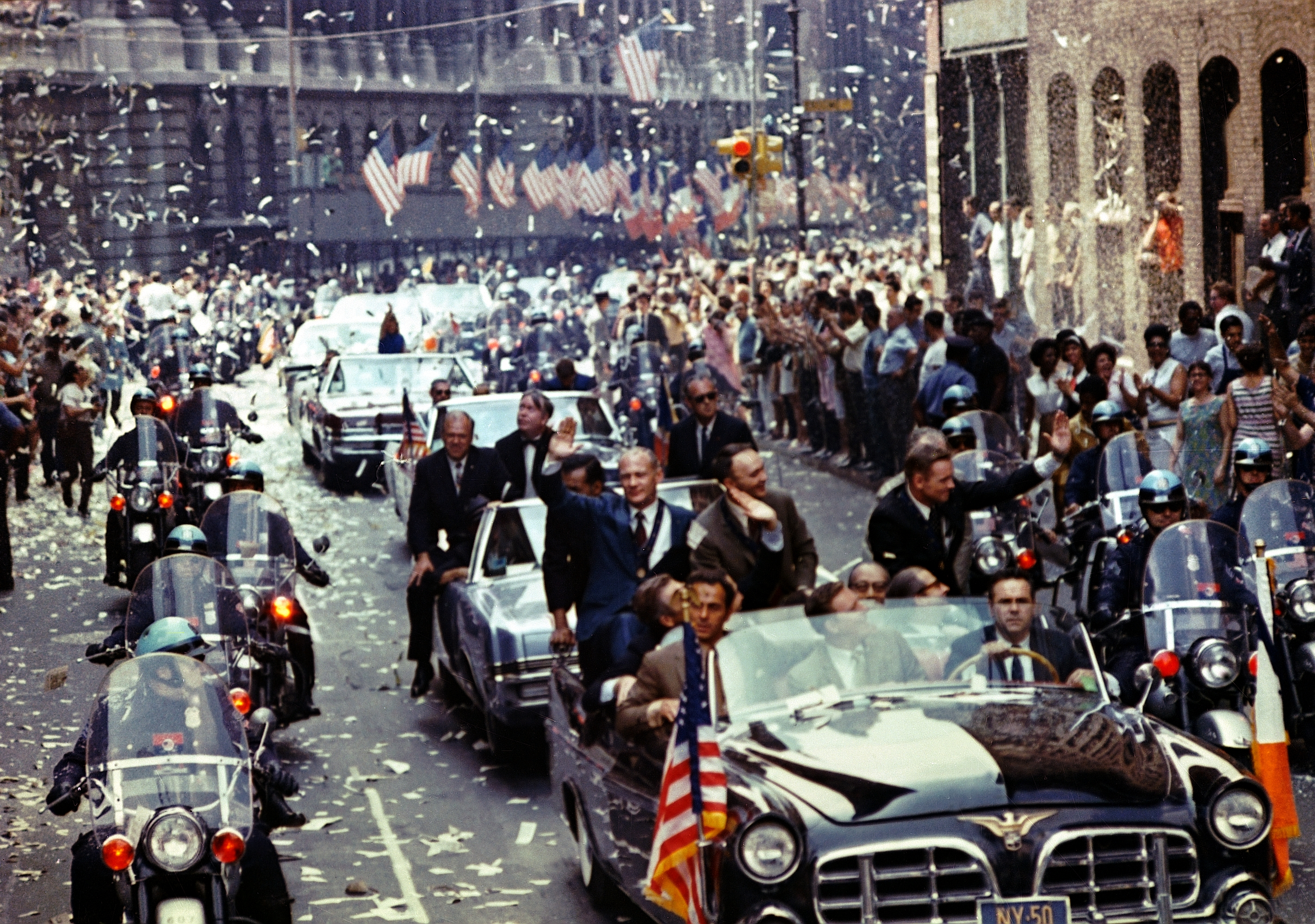
NYPD motor officers escorting the Apollo 11 astronauts at a parade in 1969

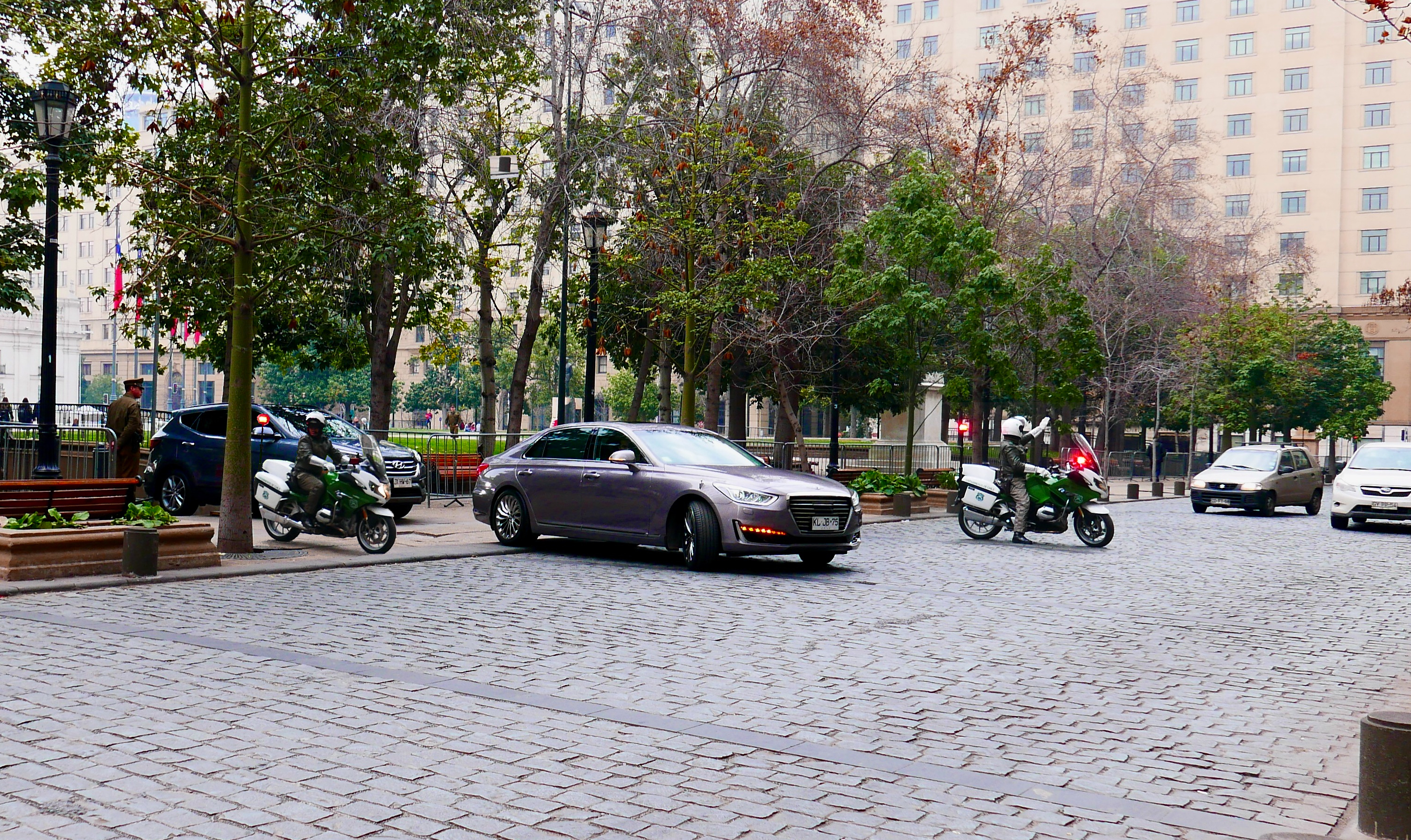
Chilean Carabineros using their motorcycles to stop traffic at La Moneda

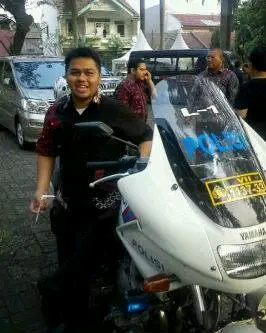
One of the official motorbikes Greater Jakarta Regional Metropolitan Police member

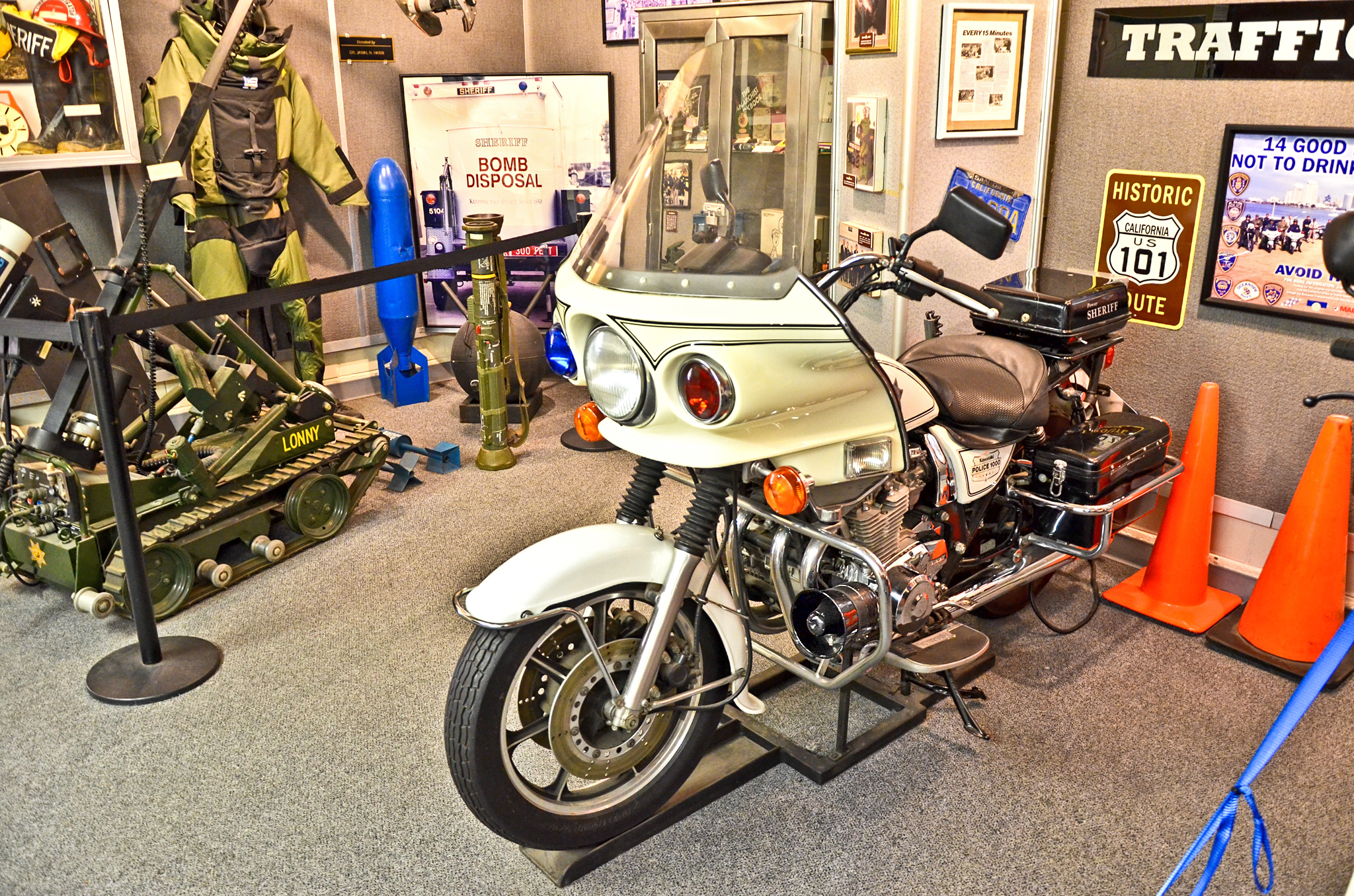
A Kawasaki KZP, a police motorcycle common in the United States in the 1980s and 1990s

== See also ==
- Blood bike
- Fire motorcycle
- Motorcycle ambulance
- Motorcycle training
- Traffic stop
- Electra Glide in Blue, 1973 film about a motorcycle officer
- CHiPs, 1977–1983 American television series about motorcycle officers
- Magnum Force, 1973 film with a plot centered around corrupt motorcycle officers
