= Moving violation (disambiguation) =

A moving violation is a type of traffic infraction.

Moving Violation(s) may also refer to:

== Film and television ==
- Moving Violation (film), a 1976 action film
- Moving Violations, a 1985 comedy film
- "Moving Violation" (CHiPs), a television episode

== Other uses ==
- Moving Violation, a 1975 album by the Jackson 5
- Moving Violations: War Zones, Wheelchairs and Declarations of Independence, a 1995 book by John Hockenberry
