= List of CHiPs episodes =

This is a list of episodes for the American crime drama television series CHiPs, which ran on NBC for six seasons and 139 episodes from September 15, 1977, to May 1, 1983. Furthermore, a reunion TV movie aired on October 27, 1998.

== Series overview ==
Season	Episodes	Originally released	
Season	Episodes	First released	Last released
1	22	September 15, 1977	April 1, 1978
2	23	September 16, 1978	May 12, 1979
3	24	September 22, 1979	March 30, 1980
4	21	September 21, 1980	May 17, 1981
5	27	October 4, 1981	May 23, 1982
6	22	October 10, 1982	May 1, 1983
Television film		October 27, 1998	

== Episodes ==
=== Season 1 (1977–78) ===
No. overall	No. in season	Title	Directed by	Written by	Original release date
1	1	"Pilot (a.k.a. Probation)"	Paul Krasny	Paul Playdon	September 15, 1977
Ponch and Jon chase a sports car theft ring. Ponch gets into a series of mishaps on his motorcycle and Sergeant Getraer comes down hard.
2	2	"Undertow"	Christian I. Nyby II	Larry Alexander	September 22, 1977
A man posing as a tow-truck driver robs women who have called for assistance. During the getaway from one such incident, the erratic driver causes a flatbed truck loaded with cylinders of nitrous oxide (laughing gas) to spin out of control. As the cylinders crash to the sidewalk, some of the valves break sending gaseous fumes everywhere - and Ponch accidentally breathes in some of the gas at the accident scene and becomes loopy. Jim Backus makes a guest appearance as a drunken driver.
3	3	"Dog Gone"	Michael Caffey	Rick Mittleman	September 29, 1977
Jon takes a liking to a lovable stray pooch with an injured paw found on the freeway, but when the dog won't stay quiet and lands Jon in the doghouse with Sergeant Getraer, he leaves the pup with Ponch. After a traffic stop, a trio of young toughs decide to teach Ponch a lesson, but it may be Jon who'll pay the price. Also, Jon and Ponch help assist on a heart attack victim.
4	4	"Moving Violation"	Edward M. Abroms	Charles Sailor	October 13, 1977
A broken down motorist takes out his anger on his old car, a small 'plane lands on the highway, and while on a date, Ponch receives a ticket and decides to attend traffic "school" to hide the citation from Getraer. Also, Jon has to deliver a painful message about an accident in Bakersfield. Guest appearances by Rosey Grier and Catherine Ferrar.
5	5	"Career Day"	Ric Rondell	Bruce Shelly	October 20, 1977
Two enterprising hustlers use CB radios to identify and rip off homes adjacent to local freeways; After Jon and Ponch arrest some joyriding frat brothers in a hearse, Ponch's former high school principal invites him to speak at the school's Career Day - but Ponch is over-come by stage fright. Guest appearance by Richard Deacon.
6	6	"Baby Food"	Paul Krasny	Simon Muntner	October 27, 1977
A delivery driver arrives at his destination and learns he's lost a portion of his load - and it's contaminated baby food. With the defective load having fallen onto the freeway, Ponch and Jon must race against time to find two of the missing cases.
7	7	"Taking Its Toll"	Georg Fenady	Bill Taub	November 3, 1977
A variety of situations to deal with gives Sergeant Getrear, Ponch and Jon a headache - a pair of bandits rip off wealthy targets while they're stopped at local toll booths, and Jon and Ponch face the tearful problem of a load of spilled and crushed onions at the harbor. Jon decides to write a novel based on Ponch's misadventures.
8	8	"Green Thumb Burglar"	Christian I. Nyby II	Skip Webster & Jock MacKelvie	November 10, 1977
Fresh plantings stolen from the highways near the command post nearly drive Getraer to distraction; a pair of psychic twins foretell gloom and doom in Ponch's immediate future. The H.R. Pufnstuf character has a cameo appearance.
9	9	"Hustle"	Georg Fenady	John Groves	November 24, 1977
Jon and Ponch must arrest a leather-clad duo on dirtbikes who heist cash from area supermarkets, tend to a car crash, and placate an irate, eccentric defendant from traffic court who claims to have photographic evidence to demonstrate that Ponch is incompetent. Cameo appearance by Broderick Crawford as himself.
10	10	"Highway Robbery"	Nicholas Colasanto	Paul Robert Coyle	December 1, 1977
A down-and-out vet lifting purses from women in traffic jams turns out to be a former classmate of Jon's, while an elephant breaking out of her circus wagon during a freeway accident, and teenagers joyriding complicate life even more. Ponch convinces Getraer to introduce him to the Easy-On Suntan Lotion model. This is actually the first episode to have Paul Linke finally join the show as a new cast member.
11	11	"Name Your Price"	Ric Rondell	Story by : Carole Raschella & Michael Raschella; Teleplay by : Carole Raschella & Michael Raschella & Bruce Shelly	December 8, 1977
A sophisticated ring of thieves drives away Rolls-Royces in broad daylight; and Ponch receives tickets to take part on his favorite game show, "Name Your Price" (a clone of The Price Is Right) where he hopes to win fame and fortune - but in the meantime, he makes the local press when he's surrounded by chickens.
12	12	"Aweigh We Go"	Ivan Nagy	Christian I. Nyby II	December 22, 1977
A rash of tractor trailer rig hijackings finds Jon and Ponch assigned to the nearby highway scale station for training; Ponch tries to convince Jon that they should buy a speedboat.
13	13	"One Two Many"	Paul Krasny	Story by : Roland Wolpert; Teleplay by : Burton Armus	January 5, 1978
A civilian impersonating a CHP officer terrorizes female drivers and lands Jon in hot water with Getraer; with his motorhome in the shop for repairs, Ponch temporarily moves into Jon's apartment. (Some TV billings and episode guides spell this episode's title as "One Too Many".)
14	14	"Rustling"	Phil Bondelli	Skip Webster & Jock MacKelvie	January 12, 1978
A new twist on cattle rustling in the city of Los Angeles has the CHP hopping around. Ponch tries to arrange a surprise birthday party for Jon but his arrangements are hampered by dirt-bike-riding big city cattle poachers with a plan involving insurance companies, and a drunken driver who has political power.
15	15	"Surf's Up"	Georg Fenady	Rudolph Borchert & Bruce Shelly	January 19, 1978
Officers Jon and Ponch request a change of scenery from the traffic hassles of the California highways and are temporarily transferred to beach patrol in the surf paradise of Malibu, but don't have much time to soak up the sun and glamour when they immediately become involved in a beach-buggy stealing syndicate.
16	16	"Vintage '54"	Barry Crane	Mort Thaw & Edward Robak	January 26, 1978
An 85-year-old woman reports her vintage car was stolen - and the thief becomes caught up in traffic on the freeway. In addition to that, Jon and Ponch face an unusual problem: a skydiver in difficulties after getting entangled on a motorway bridge, and a child is misplaced by her parents.
17	17	"Hitch-Hiking Hitch"	Phil Bondelli	Story by : Karl Tunberg & Terence Tunberg; Teleplay by : Bruce Shelly	February 9, 1978
A runaway truck without brakes, a pair of teenage girls who learn about the dangers of hitch-hiking, an elderly man who won't leave his house and a sand sailor all cause problems for Jon and Ponch.
18	18	"Cry Wolf"	John Florea	Jim Carlson & Terrence McDonnell	February 16, 1978
A man calling in a series of hoax alarms causes trouble for the highway patrol as CHP officers, ambulances and the fire services are sent dashing to the scene of non-existent accidents. And Jon and Ponch have to deal with a boa constrictor in an illegally parked car.
19	19	"Crash Diet"	Don McDougall	Rudolph Borchert	February 23, 1978
The CHP officers are under orders to lose a few pounds in weight as part of a comprehensive physical conditioning program - especially after Jon and Ponch are beaten at volleyball by a team of girls.
20	20	"Rainy Day"	Gordon Hessler	Glen Olson & Rod Baker & William D. Gordon & James Doherty	March 2, 1978
Jon and Ponch must carry out their patrols in a car during a rainy day and deal with a compulsive gambler and a string of carjackings. This episode marks the first time that Officer Barry "Bear" Baricza is seen drawing his service weapon against the criminals. In this case, he unracks the Ithaca 37 shotgun from his Dodge Monaco patrol car.
21	21	"Crack-Up"	Phil Bondelli	Rudolph Borchert	March 9, 1978
After Jon is injured in an accident, Ponch is partnered to ride with Sergeant Getraer as the hunt is on for those responsible for Jon's incident. Meanwhile, with Jon laid up seriously injured, a jovial hospital patient prescribes laughter for medicine. Guest appearance by Phyllis Diller.
22	22	"Flashback!"	Michael Caffey	Bruce Shelly	April 1, 1978
Sergeant Getraer isn't too impressed by his newest recruit's performance, especially when his motorbike is stolen. The brash rookie patrolman causes Ponch to look back on his own early days as an officer, as Jon and Ponch try to convince their flint-hided sergeant that the young rookie needs a quiet, sensitive induction into the force.

=== Season 2 (1978–79) ===
No. overall	No. in season	Title	Directed by	Written by	Original release date
23	1	"Peaks and Valleys"	Phil Bondelli	Rudolph Borchert	September 16, 1978
Central gets a new mechanic, Harlan Arliss. Ponch and Jon are accused of improperly moving an accident victim. Jon meets an old friend who tries to convince him that there are better jobs out there than CHP officers.
24	2	"The Volunteers"	John Florea	Arthur Marks	September 23, 1978
When truck drivers are forced to take a load of dangerous chemicals over treacherous mountain roads, Jon and Ponch must take on the dangerous assignment of escorting the convoy, which is carrying hazardous chlorine gas.
25	3	"Family Crisis"	Phil Bondelli	William D. Gordon & James Doherty	September 30, 1978
Jon worries when his nephew falls in with a gang of unruly teenagers who joyride in stolen cars, and ends up having to arrest the boy when he and his new friends are caught. Danny Bonaduce and Christopher Knight guest star.
26	4	"Disaster Squad"	Gordon Hessler	Max Hodge	October 7, 1978
A television news crew creates negative publicity for Jon and Ponch when they air edited news segments making the officers look bad. Also, Ponch befriends a four-year-old motorcyclist whose mother starts dating Jon.
27	5	"Neighborhood Watch"	Phil Bondelli	L. Ford Neale & John Huff	October 14, 1978
A group of skateboarding kids cause driving hazards, and a drunk-driver demands Ponch and Jon's attention repeatedly.
28	6	"Trick or Trick"	Phil Bondelli	James Schmerer	October 21, 1978
After stopping a speeding van carrying 13 black cats on Halloween, Ponch has an entire day of bad luck. On Halloween night, Jon and Ponch investigate the disappearance of a little boy in a haunted house, and a mysterious woman who steals candy from children.
29	7	"High Flyer"	Gordon Hessler	James Schmerer	November 4, 1978
Jon has his hands full with an impressionable teenage girl who has run away from home - to his house, and Ponch tries to get out of going up in a police helicopter on air patrol, but when he is unable to shirk duty must finally try to overcome his fear of flying.
30	8	"The Grudge (a.k.a. Open House)"	John Florea	Richard B. Mittleman	November 11, 1978
Jon and Ponch head a committee organising the annual police HQ open house, but are harassed by five Alpha Omega college fraternity brothers who seek revenge on the CHP after being arrested on drug charges.
31	9	"The Sheik"	Phil Bondelli	Jerry Thomas	November 18, 1978
Jon and Ponch get royal treatment from a speed-crazy young prince, and are frustrated by the diplomatic immunity that is protecting the reckless driver.
32	10	"Return of the Turks"	Barry Crane	Stephen Lord	November 25, 1978
Two of Ponch's old high-school pals decide to relive their youths by raising havoc, driving recklessly on the freeway and causing several accidents; and a man pretending to be a CHP officer continually gets Ponch into trouble.
33	11	"Supercycle"	Phil Bondelli	Story by : Barney Slater & William D. Gordon & James Doherty; Teleplay by : William D. Gordon & James Doherty	December 2, 1978
Jon and Ponch pursue and try to identify the "Phantom", a daredevil artist who performs illegal, high-speed stunts on a souped-up motorcycle that are played out at the risk of innocent bystanders.
34	12	"High Explosive"	Barry Crane	Story by : Suzanne Ryder; Teleplay by : William D. Gordon & James Doherty	December 9, 1978
Jon takes pity on a lonely young boy who causes a road accident by accidentally firing on cars with an air gun near an expressway, and tries to play father to the young lad. Meanwhile, after losing his job as a driver, a man steals an ambulance and fills it with dynamite.
35	13	"Down Time"	John Florea	Richard B. Mittleman	December 16, 1978
Ponch's vacation is ruined when a ring of car thieves steal his Firebird. Randi Oakes guest stars as Kim, one of the female car thieves; it was this performance that landed her the regular role of Officer Bonnie Clark the following season.
36	14	"Repo Man"	Alex Grasshoff	Rudolph Borchert	January 6, 1979
The officers apprehend a repossession man who has been stealing cars and tries to destroy Ponch and Jon's credit rating after they prevent him from harassing private citizens.
37	15	"MAIT Team"	John Florea	Story by : George Zateslo; Teleplay by : William D. Gordon & James Doherty and George Zateslo	January 13, 1979
Officer Sindy Cahill is wounded in a chain of highway incidents that kills at least 11 people and involves an out-of-control car. Jon and Ponch become part of a Multi-Discipline Accident Investigation Team to try to discover the cause.
38	16	"Pressure Point"	Phil Bondelli	Paul Robert Coyle	January 20, 1979
A rich businessman and his granddaughter become the target of an unscrupulous security firm. Jon and Ponch go undercover, with Ponch becoming a diplomat and Jon his chauffeur, to investigate the crooked protection racket.
39	17	"The Matchmakers"	Harvey Laidman	L. Ford Neale & John Huff	January 27, 1979
A woman named Cora Gilford is forced to move from her home so she tries to kill herself. Derk, a 30-year motor veteran, is set to retire. The CHPs play matchmaker between Cora and Derk.
40	18	"Rally 'Round the Bank"	Barry Crane	Lee H. Grant	February 3, 1979
While investigating a string of drive-in bank robberies, where the thieves use a fake bomb and a rally race to carry off their heists, Ponch is baffled when he receives a visit from his mother, and also a safety violation.
41	19	"Bio-Rhythms"	Don Weis	James Schmerer	February 17, 1979
A rival tries to take out a trucking company by any means necessary. Jon and Ponch are involved when the woman who owns the targeted company receives violent threats from the gangsters trying to put her out of work. Biorhythms are being charted to track highs and lows.
42	20	"Quarantine"	Harvey Laidman	Rudolph Borchert	February 24, 1979
Central HQ has to be quarantined after a boy is brought in suffering from a mysterious disease.
43	21	"CHP-BMX"	John Florea	Richard B. Mittleman	March 3, 1979
Jon and Sindy are training a BMX team for kids, and Ponch takes care of a young boy who was caught vandalizing his school. Distracted by an accident to his son, Sergeant Getraer mistakenly releases a dangerous narcotics suspect.
44	22	"Ride the Whirlwind"	Larry Wilcox	Stephen Lord	March 10, 1979
Jon puts together a pilot program for a special trail bike team to deal with outlaw bikers illegally riding in the hills. The first of two episodes directed by Larry Wilcox.
45	23	"The Greatest Adventures of CHiPs"	Don Weis	L. Ford Neale & John Huff	May 12, 1979
Jon and Ponch are away in Bakersfield. Sarge and their fellow officers back at Central reminisce about the past two years. The two heroes shall be honored with a special prize. This was a 90-minute clip show episode.

=== Season 3 (1979–80) ===
No. overall	No. in season	Title	Directed by	Written by	Original release date
46	1	"Roller Disco: Parts 1 & 2"	Don Weis	Rudolph Borchert	September 22, 1979
47	2	"Roller Disco: Parts 1 & 2"	Don Weis	Rudolph Borchert	September 22, 1979
Jon and Ponch help organize the annual CHP fund-raising roller disco, and Jon and Getraer ride together while Ponch is busy hunting down stars for the event. Jon has also really got his hands full trying to protect famous, troubled rock star Jimmy Tyler (Leif Garrett) and his manager and lets the troubled popstar stay at his apartment when a new crimewave problem is encountered - pickpockets on skates. Jon loses the skater he's been chasing. Meanwhile, Ponch is still looking for his skater but can't find him. NFL Football stars Fred Williamson and Jim Brown appear in both part one and part two.
48	3	"Valley Go Home!"	Barry Crane	L. Ford Neale & John Huff	September 29, 1979
The rivalry between two teenage gangs intensifies when each blames the other for a series of robberies. Officers mediate a feud between teenagers. Ponch and Jon intervene when some irate surfers chase the Valley kids who bumped their car. Meanwhile, a couple of thieves use trash pickup as a cover to rip off beach-goers' tape decks.
49	4	"High Octane"	John Florea	James Schmerer	October 6, 1979
While Ponch and Jon resolve a confrontation at a gas station, Grossie and Sergeant Getraer come across an accident caused by an oil truck. But during the ensuing pursuit of the fleeing gas station suspects, Getraer is seriously injured. Jon and Ponch must track down the culprits. This episode marks Brianne Leary's final appearance as Sindy Cahill.
50	5	"Death Watch"	Barry Crane	Larry Alexander	October 13, 1979
The death of a fellow officer sets Ponch and Jon on the trail of a stunt driver who instigates accidents to pay back insurance companies.
51	6	"Counterfeit"	John Florea	Dean R. Koontz	October 20, 1979
A bogus clergyman prints counterfeit money that circulates to Ponch. Meanwhile, Ponch is worried that his blind date is too shallow.
52	7	"Return of the Supercycle"	Bruce Kessler	Rick Mittleman	October 27, 1979
Ponch ends up in hospital when he crashes while pursuing a jewelry burglar on a motorbike. Jon and Ponch think it could be Roy Yarnell, who's back in town with his own stunt show; and Jon uses the CHP's Supercycle machine to go after the thief. Meanwhile, a new female officer is interested in Jon, but his colleagues think she's there to spy on them.
53	8	"Hot Wheels"	John Florea	Larry Alexander	November 3, 1979
A spate of jewelry robberies is committed by thieves using city vehicles. Ponch thinks he's solved the crimes from his hospital bed. Meanwhile, practical joker Bill Clayton rejoins the team at Central.
54	9	"Drive, Lady, Drive: Parts 1 & 2"	Don Weis	William D. Gordon & James Doherty	November 10, 1979
55	10	"Drive, Lady, Drive: Parts 1 & 2"	Don Weis	William D. Gordon & James Doherty	November 10, 1979
Ponch, Jon, Bear, and Lenny go to Palma Vista to bolster ranks of the small-town Palma Vista Police Department as officers there go on strike. While there, they help an orphaned 10-year-old girl find a new home, arrest a councilman's two sons and city manager's daughter on some serious traffic charges, and uncover an illicit sales headquarters of a group of hijackers. Ponch falls for a lady race car driver but loses out in the end. Donna/Linda is taken back to her foster home, but Candi suspects something is wrong. Jon and Ponch catch the dune buggy, and Jon discovers the hijackers' hideout. Note: Rather than using Phoenix International Raceway for some of the racing scenes, all of it was done at Riverside International Raceway.
56	11	"The Watch Commander"	Don Weis	Frank Telford	November 17, 1979
A new watch commander, Lieutenant Bates, tries to make sure everything runs by the rule book but eventually sees the need for flexibility. A pair of thieves are renting tractor units and stealing packed trailers from loading bays. This episodes features Granville Van Dusen, Lois Hamilton, and Don Mitchell from the 1967 hit television series Ironside.
57	12	"Destruction Derby"	Gordon Hessler	Richard B. Mittleman	November 24, 1979
Ponch and Jon go undercover at a raceway to probe a drug ring.
58	13	"Second Chance"	John Florea	Frank Chase & Ramona Chase	December 1, 1979
Jon and Ponch try to apprehend a jewel thief who has hit several condos in Marina del Rey, but the craze for motorcycle riding in the street hinders their chase when the thief injures a young girl while making a motorcycle getaway. Ponch tries to befriend a recovering girl who was injured during the thief's escape and, not as tough as the case, but very rewarding, is the time the two officers spend at a children's hospital.
59	14	"Wheeling"	Barry Crane	L. Ford Neale & John Huff	December 8, 1979
A trio of wheelchair-using drivers create problems for Jon and Ponch both in and out of their vehicles. The father of a hit-and-run victim is determined to catch the driver responsible, with or without the help of the CHP.
60	15	"Christmas Watch"	Phil Bondelli	L. Ford Neale & John Huff	December 15, 1979
A pair of thieves are robbing houses in the run-up to Christmas. Ponch is feeling down because he longs for a family Christmas and doesn't know his mother is flying in. A bell is stolen and means a lot to the little kids.
61	16	"Jailbirds"	Bruce Kessler	James Schmerer	January 12, 1980
First Jon then Ponch get put in jail for contempt of court when they refuse to name their informant. Getraer gets the rest of the team searching through parking violations to prove the defendant was no stranger to the raided warehouse.
62	17	"E.M.T."	Phil Bondelli	Jerry Thomas & Frank Dandridge	January 19, 1980
A swerving driver pulled over by Jon and Ponch turns out to be a fireman. Back at Central they volunteer for an E.M.T. course without reading the small print. The course is run by the fireman they pulled over, and he gives them a hard time. Later, Jon and Ponch save a car crash victim with a hang glider and rescue a pair of kids from their cave-like den under the freeway.
63	18	"Kidnap"	Gordon Hessler	Stephen Kandel	January 26, 1980
Jon and Ponch escort the mischievous young winners of a Traffic Safety Essay Contest on a tour of the courthouse, but, after starting one of the CHP bikes they hide in the back of a Rolls-Royce. Two fleeing criminals jump into the Rolls and drive off, initially unaware that the kids are in the back. After briefly losing the Rolls, Ponch decides to follow undercover in a borrowed car, and leads his colleagues to the kidnappers with his "La Cucaracha" horn.
64	19	"Off Road"	William Paul Nuckles	George Geiger	February 2, 1980
Jon and Ponch enter a desert off-road race, unaware that a pair of syndicate thugs are using the race as a cover to retrieve a cache of stolen coins.
65	20	"Tow Truck Lady"	Larry Wilcox	Max Hodge	February 9, 1980
A tow truck driver steals cars with his tow truck to pay off a loan.
66	21	"The Strippers"	Don Weis	Frank Telford	February 16, 1980
A Mercedes belonging to Jon's girlfriend gets stolen while they're skydiving. Jon and Ponch's subsequent investigation results in them crossing paths with a pair of narcotics officers who are investigating a similar drug smuggling operation.
67	22	"Thrill Show"	Gordon Hessler	L. Ford Neale & John Huff	February 23, 1980
A punk rock group, humorously called "The Bus Boys," is stealing from the patrons of tourist buses to get money for a demo record. Bonnie plans to leave her job on the force and join up with her former boyfriend, Crazy Ray Conner, the stunt driver with The Joey Chitwood Thrill Show.
68	23	"Nightingale"	Don Weis	Kenneth Dorward	March 23, 1980
Various CHP officers encounter a mysterious female doctor who treats accident victims, then disappears before anyone gets her details. A teenage couple try to run away to Canada, but their van breaks down on the freeway.
69	24	"Dynamite Alley"	Bruce Kessler	Story by : Rudolph Borchert; Teleplay by : Rudolph Borchert & James Schmerer	March 30, 1980
Bonnie flips her cruiser on the way back from Bakersfield, and the only witness is a boy she talks to on the CB. Grossman is writing an article for Highway Patrol magazine about hallucinations experienced while driving.

=== Season 4 (1980–81) ===
No. overall	No. in season	Title	Directed by	Written by	Original release date
70	1	"Go-Cart Terror"	John Florea	James Schmerer	September 21, 1980
The CHP pursues furniture thieves. Ponch and Jon prepare a go-cart team for competition while also trying to help one of its misguided members.
71	2	"Sick Leave"	John Florea	Larry Alexander	September 28, 1980
Jon and Ponch try to help fellow officer Andy, who is pulling dangerous stunts at work, making warped judgment calls and causing a strain in his relationships.
72	3	"To Your Health"	John Florea	L. Ford Neale & John Huff	October 5, 1980
Jon and Ponch help a farmer and his sisters, who have had several near-fatal accidents that look like sabotage.
73	4	"The Poachers"	Barry Crane	Marshall Herskovitz	October 19, 1980
A teenage boy finds himself hunted by poachers when he tries to prevent the illegal slaughter of some deer. Jon and Ponch chase the poachers, who sell the meat of the wild animals to restaurants. Two Native Americans assist their pursuit.
74	5	"The Great 5K Star Race and Boulder Wrap Party: Parts 1 & 2"	Gordon Hessler	Rudolph Borchert	December 7, 1980
75	6	"The Great 5K Star Race and Boulder Wrap Party: Parts 1 & 2"	Gordon Hessler	Rudolph Borchert	December 7, 1980
A possible disaster at the fashionable Malibu beach and the department's annual charity fundraiser keep Jon and Ponch busy. Jon and Ponch continue with their evacuation program for Malibu residents. Two daredevil criminals plan their escape route from a mansion belonging to a film producer. Guest appearance by Milton Berle.
76	7	"Satan's Angels"	Phil Bondelli	William Douglas Lansford	December 14, 1980
A gang of bikers kidnaps Bonnie. Jon and Ponch are sent to find her. Getraer's wife is in and out of the hospital on false labor alarms.
77	8	"Wheels of Justice"	Gordon Hessler	L. Ford Neale & John Huff	December 21, 1980
Jon and Ponch try to get a drunken driver off the road. The staff cares for orphaned babies after an accident.
78	9	"Crash Course"	Phil Bondelli	L. Ford Neale & John Huff	January 4, 1981
A car thief moves into the robbery business. Ponch has some problems to sort out with his bank account.
79	10	"Forty Tons of Trouble"	Gordon Hessler	James Schmerer	January 11, 1981
Jon, Ponch, and the gang try to stop a group of thieves that are stealing heavy equipment from an independent construction company owner.
80	11	"11-99: Officer Needs Help"	Phil Bondelli	Kenneth Dorward	January 18, 1981
A new system is put in use to send back-up faster to injured officers. Testing it, Jon and Ponch track down thieves that are stealing delivery trucks from loading docks.
81	12	"Home Fires Burning"	Charles Bail	Story by : Judith Dark & Rex Benson; Teleplay by : Rex Benson	February 1, 1981
As part of an insurance scam, arsonists start burning down mobile homes, causing chaos for Jon and Ponch. Meanwhile, they prepare for a basketball game.
82	13	"Sharks"	Phil Bondelli	Frank Telford	February 22, 1981
A supposedly quiet day of scuba-diving finds Ponch and Jon face-to-face with a ring of drug smugglers and sharks.
83	14	"Ponch's Angels: Part 1"	John Florea	Rudolph Borchert	February 28, 1981
Ponch and Jon are assigned to train the CHP's first female motorcycle cops.
84	15	"Ponch's Angels: Part 2"	John Florea	Rudolph Borchert	March 1, 1981
The newly trained female officers nab a pair of thieves operating in and around a large marina.
85	16	"Karate"	Leslie H. Martinson	Frank Chase	March 8, 1981
Patrolling his old neighborhood, Ponch encounters a boyhood friend who is corrupting local teenagers in his burglary operation. This episode marks the last time that Officer Baricza draws his service weapon against a suspect. He draws his Colt Python service revolver to defend himself against a juvenile that overpowered him with karate, forcing the boy to flee before Baricza could fire one round.
86	17	"New Guy in Town"	Arnold Laven	Larry Alexander	March 15, 1981
An annoying rookie proves his worth when he saves Jon from death at the hands of the brother- and sister-in-law of a man the officer had imprisoned.
87	18	"The Hawk and the Hunter"	Leslie H. Martinson	Rick Mittleman	April 5, 1981
Jon and Ponch probe into a case involving an environmentalist's allegations that Baricza's father, Pete, is polluting their town with his insecticides.
88	19	"Vigilante"	Arnold Laven	Stephen Lord	May 3, 1981
Ponch and Jon investigate a mysterious vandal harassing Getraer and his family. They also have to get a handle on a local community patrol operation. One of its members has become a vigilante, using excessive force while trying to fight crime in remembrance of his son who was run down by a drunk driver. Getraer, for no reason whatsoever, snaps at his fellow officers throughout the day.
89	20	"Dead Man's Riddle"	Michael Caffey	William D. Gordon & James Doherty	May 10, 1981
A psychiatrist joining the Accident Investigation Team fears that she may have been responsible for a serious high-speed collision that the CHP is currently trying to recreate in an investigation that led to the death of a LACoFD fire captain.
90	21	"A Simple Operation"	Leslie H. Martinson	James Schmerer	May 17, 1981
Getraer injures his eye in a motorcycle accident and ends up in the hospital. A hit man thinks Getraer saw his attack and plans to eliminate him. Getraer suffers cardiac arrest while in the hospital and nearly dies but he is brought back by his resuscitation team. A patient who was in a bed next to Getraer is murdered. Two of the doctors disagree about Getraer's eyesight being saved.

=== Season 5 (1981–82) ===
In the fifth season, Ponch is substituted by the officer Steve McLeish (episode number 96).

No. overall	No. in season	Title	Directed by	Written by	Original release date
91	1	"Suicide Stunt"	Michael Caffey	Frank Telford	October 4, 1981
Jon and Ponch organize a stakeout to catch thieves who have ripped off a motorcycle show ticket office.
92	2	"Vagabonds"	Bruce Kessler	William Douglas Lansford	October 11, 1981
Preparing for a UniCar competition, Ponch and Jon pursue a family in a camper van that is causing accidents to claim insurance money.
93	3	"Moonlight"	Earl Bellamy	Rudy Dochtermann	October 18, 1981
Jon and Ponch investigate reports of the dumping of toxic waste. Other officers try to get Getraer in on a celebration of Jon and Ponch 's fourth anniversary as partners.
94	4	"The Killer Indy"	Leslie H. Martinson	Milt Rosen	October 25, 1981
A gang of outlaw bikers terrorize the streets when they rip through the city, turning city streets into dangerous speedways as they have races through city traffic in a life-or-death contest to find the ultimate motorcycle champion. The leader of the gang challenges Steve's older brother to a final showdown to win the title of King of the Indy. First appearance of Bruce Jenner as Steve McLeish. Erik Estrada does not appear in this episode due to a fractured coccyx.
95	5	"Weed Wars"	Earl Bellamy	Rudolph Borchert	October 31, 1981
An aspiring small-time drug operation runs foul of syndicate hoods - and the CHiPs - when two shady entrepreneurs organize pot growers in a bid to make a big financial killing. When a young boy witnesses an accident resulting from a feud with a rival drug syndicates recklessly driving along a mountain road, Jon and Ponch track the desperate drug team during a series of high-speed chases in an effort to capture the culprits before they become victims of their own greed or cause injury to others - with little cooperation from the boy, who is using his jinx spells to scare people away.
96	6	"Anything But the Truth"	Michael Caffey	Dick Nelson	November 8, 1981
Jon and Steve try to track down a man who is terrorizing female drivers. Complicating things is the fact that their main witness is a compulsive liar and Jon's girlfriend. This episode was originally filmed in May 1980 during season four. Randi Oakes' hair is much shorter, Bruce Jenner accidentally flips over a Honda ATC during the filming of the cold opening at Indian Dunes on August 26, 1981, Larry Wilcox actually injures his shoulder during the lumber yard scene, and Erik Estrada does not appear in this episode due to a shoulder injury that he sustained after filming the episode "Sick Leave."
97	7	"Bomb Run"	Phil Bondelli	Rick Mittleman	November 15, 1981
As the CHP prepares for an air show, Baricza runs into his former girlfriend, Terri. Although married, she makes a play for Baricza to distract him from what she, her husband, and father are planning: robbing the flight show bureau.
98	8	"Diamond in the Rough"	Leslie H. Martinson	Steve Greenberg & Aubrey Solomon	November 22, 1981
An investigation of a hit and run accident involves a friend of Getraer's son. Jon and Steve try to reunite the troubled youngster with his father, they inadvertently uncover a complex, sophisticated bank robbery plot to steal diamonds.
99	9	"Finders Keepers"	John Peyser	Robert Biheller & W. Dal Jenkins	November 29, 1981
Criminals chase and harass Steve after recovering their stolen car. Jon falls for a country and western singer.
100	10	"Fast Money"	Leslie H. Martinson	Larry Alexander	December 5, 1981
Hijackers use a hi-tech device to steal bearer bonds.
101	11	"Concours d'Elegance"	John Patterson	Frank Telford	December 13, 1981
Jon and Ponch investigate a scam designed to skim profits from auction sales of rare antique motor cars.
102	12	"Mitchell & Woods"	Bernard L. Kowalski	Rick Edelstein	December 18, 1981
Female patrolwomen Mitchell and Woods find themselves on the trail of a murder suspect. This episode is the first failed attempt at a spin-off series.
103	13	"Breaking Point"	Leslie H. Martinson	Vander Cecil	January 3, 1982
Jon acts quickly to save partner Ponch, pinned under a guillotine of razor-sharp shards after he is forced to crash his motorcycle through a plate glass window. Ponch's confidence is broken after the accident - his performance at work suffers as a result, and Getraer suggests taking time off. Ponch's sister, Patti, is in town, and they both begin to think about a new start.
104	14	"Tiger in the Streets"	Charles Bail	Stephen Lord	January 10, 1982
While pursuing a vengeful hotrod mechanic who is carrying out a personal vendetta against a car club, Jon and Ponch stumble on a dangerous big-game trap. Reports of a phantom tiger puzzle the pair; An employee of a poorly maintained animal park is blamed for the escape but does not notify the police early on. An attractive officer from the animal division assists the duo in its capture.
105	15	"Bright Flashes"	Leslie H. Martinson	Story by : Jaron Summers & James Doherty; Teleplay by : James Doherty	January 17, 1982
A criminal duo equipped with a powerful laser causes havoc in the city, blinding witnesses while committing robberies. Jon's childhood hero has lost his way, and Jon tries to get him back on track.
106	16	"Battle of the Bands"	Barry Crane	Larry Mollin	January 31, 1982
The CHP tries to get a group of punk rockers under control. Ponch kicks off a stint as a singer.
107	17	"Alarmed"	Phil Bondelli	Rudolph Borchert	February 14, 1982
Jon becomes the victim of a gang of car thieves with a difference - they're all female; and Ponch is nearly killed when the gang leader rams his motorcycle. The ladies are wanted for grand theft auto when they hunt down valuable cars for big money - and Bonnie's former mentor turns out to be a key member of the gang.
108	18	"In the Best of Families"	John Florea	Rick Mittleman	February 21, 1982
Jon and Ponch try to apprehend a family of thieves who make several attempts to steal a CHP cruiser as part of a bigger plot to commit an armored truck hit. Getraer is uptight and buckles down on Central as they prepare for a major inspection.
109	19	"Silent Partner"	Gordon Hessler	Bruce Shelly	February 28, 1982
A pair of bungling car thieves create havoc for CHiPs and send Officer Grossman to the hospital making their escape. Jon and Ponch mistake a man with a hearing and speech defect for a drunken driver.
110	20	"Flare Up"	John Florea	Larry Mollin	March 7, 1982
Jon and Ponch learn about the dangers of reacting chemicals when they swing into action when a tanker overturns and produces a deadly gas. Additionally, Ponch has his hands full with a young man claiming police brutality.
111	21	"The Game of War"	Gordon Hessler	Story by : Marshall Ragir; Teleplay by : L. Ford Neale & John Huff	March 14, 1982
The freeways of Los Angeles become a mobile battleground when war game enthusiasts take their games off of the drawing board and into the rush-hour traffic. Jon and Ponch must deal with the bunch of would-be soldiers when their war games get out of hand as part of a plot to free a wanted convict before he can be transported back across state lines by federal authorities.
112	22	"A Threat of War"	Leslie H. Martinson	Doug Heyes Jr.	March 21, 1982
Andy Macedon is back on the streets again, trying to prove that he has turned over a new leaf. It is not long before the CHP again deals with Billy and the gang. Danny Bonaduce guest stars.
113	23	"Trained for Trouble"	Barry Crane	Larry Alexander	April 4, 1982
The division is plagued by the most unconventional hit-and-run bandits imaginable when animal bank robbers make monkeys of the cops. Ponch discovers that a look-alike in CHP uniform is a stripteaser at a ladies-only nightclub.
114	24	"Ice Cream Man"	Leslie H. Martinson	William Douglas Lansford	April 18, 1982
A former CHP sergeant, out of prison and now working as an ice cream man, sets out to bring down the gang that got him put in jail. He also tries to set things right with his ex-wife and son, who thinks his father is dead.
115	25	"Overload"	Robert Pine	Bob & Esther Mitchell	May 2, 1982
Computer-theft plotters jam the CHP computer center and attempt to rendezvous with an ocean-bound yacht.
116	26	"K-9-1"	Leslie H. Martinson	Stephen Lord	May 9, 1982
Ponch and Jon work with police sniffer dogs of the LASD on the trail of bombs, drugs and thieves. Randi Oakes, Michael Dorn, and Brodie Greer's final episode as cast members.
117	27	"Force Seven"	Lee H. Katzin	Stephen Downing	May 23, 1982
A secret LAPD unit is dedicated to the preservation of human life using martial arts. This episode is the second failed attempt at a spin-off series. Larry Wilcox's final episode as a cast member. First appearance of former motorcycle racer Tom Reilly who would later join the cast of the show in the final season as Officer Bobby Nelson, and former Los Angeles Rams linebacker Fred Dryer who would later find work as Rick Hunter on the 1984 hit television series Hunter.

=== Season 6 (1982–83) ===
In the sixth and final season, Ponch receives a new partner when Jon moves to Wyoming.

No. overall	No. in season	Title	Directed by	Written by	Original release date
118	1	"Meet the New Guy"	John Astin	Joseph Gunn & Rick Rosner	October 10, 1982
Ponch becomes the training officer of rookie Bobby Nelson. The duo goes after a pair of health-club thieves and find a runaway teenage mother who has stolen back the baby she sold. First episode that contains several new cast members including former Dallas Cowboys Cheerleader Tina Gayle, former motorcycle racer Tom Reilly's second appearance on the show, and actor Clarence Gilyard.
119	2	"Tight Fit"	John Florea	Rick Rosner, Joseph Gunn & Paul Mason	October 17, 1982
Ponch takes a part-time job as a model for a jeans company but finds he does not enjoy being an instant celebrity. Stardom distracts him from his real work, the rewarding job of catching a pair of diamond thieves and putting behind bars a sleazy photographer involved in child pornography.
120	3	"The Spaceman Made Me Do It"	Winrich Kolbe	Donald L. Gold & Rick Rosner	October 24, 1982
On night patrol, Ponch and Bobby respond to a jewelry store alarm. The culprit is a young girl, who claims an alien made her do it.
121	4	"Rock Devil Rock"	John Astin	Larry Mollin & Rick Rosner	October 31, 1982
Ponch and Bobby's assignment as security duty for Moloch, a Satanically painted (i.e. like Kiss' Gene Simmons) metal-like rock singer, turns into near tragedy when the singer's car takes on a life of its own and a taped message states that the 'devil is going to take him', leaving Ponch to perform a daring rescue. The CHP officers throw a wild Halloween party, with Harlan bringing Elvira as a special guest. Note: Donny Most (Happy Days) and Elvira (Cassandra Peterson) guests.
122	5	"Speedway Fever"	Charles Bail	Paul Mason, Paul Playdon (developed for television by), Rick Rosner & Gerald Sanford	November 7, 1982
Ponch and Bobby go after a gang of high-speed bike bandits. Bruce Nelson, Bobby's younger brother and a young cadet at the CHP Academy, is having difficulty deciding between a career with the CHP and being a professional motorcycle racer and tries to help his brother on the case. This episode included footage from the 1982 Individual Speedway World Championship that Bruce Penhall won, modified to work into his role as Bruce Nelson. First episode to have Bruce Penhall as a new cast member. The episode also has a guest star appearance by Moon Zappa as a Valley Girl.
123	6	"Something Special"	Charles Bail	Beverly Bloomberg, Rick Rosner & Pamela Ryan	November 21, 1982
Ponch helps children train for the Special Olympics. An old friend of Bobby's prepares for a parachute jump. Grossman buys a truckload of eggs.
124	7	"This Year's Riot"	Richard A. Colla	Larry Mollin & Rick Rosner	November 28, 1982
A group of wild kids and some would-be nude sunbathers ruin the CHiPs crew's outing at Grossman's beach house.
125	8	"Head Over Heels"	Richard Irvin	Loraine Despres & Rick Rosner	December 5, 1982
Ponch falls in love with a beautiful schoolteacher (Beverly Sassoon) and begins making plans to marry her.
126	9	"Return to Death's Door"	Winrich Kolbe	Gerald Sanford & Rick Rosner	December 12, 1982
A man blames Ponch for the death of his brother—who was also Ponch's friend—and challenges him to a race.
127	10	"Fallout"	Nicholas Sgarro	Story by : Rick Rosner; Teleplay by : Norman Hudis & Larry Mollin	December 19, 1982
Anti-nuclear protesters — including Sgt. Getraer's daughter, Ellen — cause trouble for the patrol, and even more-so for Getraer when Ellen is arrested during a peaceful protest against a company supporting the United States' nuclear arsenal.
128	11	"Day of the Robot"	Phil Bondelli	Gerald Sanford & Rick Rosner	January 2, 1983
A robot is assigned to the CHP station. Some of the Highway Patrol personnel are worried that the efficient, high-tech robot is going to replace them, but Ponch and Bobby have fun with the new robotic patrolman - until it turns and becomes a threat to their lives. Ponch and Bobby are also busy trying to convince some 'Freeway Angels' to leave police work to the professionals.
129	12	"Hot Date"	John Florea	Joseph Gunn, Paul Mason & Rick Rosner	January 9, 1983
Ponch's excited anticipation at seeing his date turns to horror when he is greeted in his own apartment and held prisoner by two brothers who are thirsty for revenge.
130	13	"High Times"	Phil Bondelli	Gerald Sanford & Rick Rosner	January 16, 1983
Ponch and Bobby try to track down a couple of juvenile car thieves.
131	14	"Country Action"	Charles Bail	Joseph Gunn, Paul Mason & Rick Rosner	January 23, 1983
Ponch and Bobby are on the trail of a gang of cattle rustlers selling cattle infected with anthrax.
132	15	"Journey to a Spacecraft"	Richard Irving	Gerald Sanford & Rick Rosner	February 6, 1983
Ponch and Bobby have to take care of both a kidnapped dog and a sick child, Kevin. Kevin is dreaming of UFOs taking him away from his sickness, so Ponch's friend allows him a look into the night sky. But when Kevin runs away, Ponch and Bobby must find the youngster, who will die unless he receives a liver transplant. They figure he went to Edwards Air Force Base to watch the landing of the Space Shuttle.
133	16	"Foxtrap"	Charles Bail	Larry Mollin & Rick Rosner	February 20, 1983
Ponch and Bobby try to prevent three female rock musicians from being victimized by an unscrupulous concert promoter.
134	17	"Brat Patrol"	John Astin	Joseph Gunn, Paul Mason & Rick Rosner	February 27, 1983
Ponch and Bobby are on the hunt for a drug dealer and get some help from a rag-tag gang of youngsters along the way.
135	18	"Firepower"	Phil Bondelli	Donald L. Gold & Rick Rosner	March 6, 1983
Ponch and Bobby try to catch a gang of bikers selling dangerous weapons on the black market.
136	19	"Fun House"	Charles Bail	Rick Rosner & Gerald Sanford	March 13, 1983
When Ponch and Bobby look into a series of thefts at a local campus, Getraer agrees to help clear members of his former college fraternity who are accused of the thefts. Meanwhile, Bruce tries to find a little girl, Lindsey (Heather O'Rourke), who is abducted by a woman.
137	20	"Fast Company"	Phil Bondelli	Gerald Sanford, Stuart Jacobs, Rick Rosner & Barry Jacobs	March 20, 1983
Ponch teams up with Bruce who is now an officer to find the person behind a car theft.
138	21	"Things That Go Creep in the Night"	Robert Pine	Rick Rosner, Barry Jacobs & Stuart Jacobs	April 10, 1983
Ponch and Bruce try to protect a woman who is seemingly being stalked by a comic book character (Rich Little).
139	22	"Return of the Brat Patrol"	Phil Bondelli	Loraine Despres, Joseph Gunn, Paul Mason & Rick Rosner	May 1, 1983
A band of teenage misfits, ex-members of Ponch's Explorer Troop, returns to help him catch a group of junior-high extortionists.

=== Television film (1998) ===
Title	Directed by	Written by	Original release date
CHiPs '99	Jon Cassar	Story by : Rick Rosner & Morgan Gendel; Teleplay by : Morgan Gendel	October 27, 1998
Ponch has returned to the police force and is determined to help his best friend, Jon, to investigate various car thefts.

== Ratings ==
Season	Episodes	Start date	End date	Nielsen rank	Nielsen rating
1977–78	22	September 15, 1977	April 1, 1978	58 (Note: Tied with "The Bionic Woman" and "Saturday Night at the Movies")	N/A
1978–79	23	September 16, 1978	May 12, 1979	29	20.1 (Note: Tied with "What's Happening!!")
1979–80	24	September 22, 1979	March 30, 1980	18	21.5
1980–81	21	September 21, 1980	May 17, 1981	24	19.4 (Note: Tied with "ABC Sunday Night Movie")
1981–82	27	October 4, 1981	May 23, 1982	41	N/A
1982–83	22	October 10, 1982	May 1, 1983	52	N/A
