= CHiPs =

American television crime drama series (1977–1983)

- Genre: Crime drama
- Created by: Rick Rosner
- Developed by: Paul Playdon
- Starring: Larry Wilcox; Erik Estrada; Robert Pine; Tom Reilly
- Theme music composer: John Parker
- Country of origin: United States
- Original language: English
- No. of seasons: 6
- No. of episodes: 139 (and 1 TV movie) (list of episodes)

Production
- Running time: 48 minutes
- Production companies: Rosner Television; MGM Television

Original release
- Network: NBC
- Release: September 15, 1977 – May 1, 1983

CHiPs is an American crime drama television series created by Rick Rosner and originally aired on NBC from September 15, 1977, to May 1, 1983. It follows the lives of two motorcycle officers of the California Highway Patrol (CHP). The series ran for 139 episodes over six seasons, plus one reunion television film in October 1998.

== Overview ==
CHiPs (an acronym for California Highway Patrol) is an action crime drama in a standard hour-long time slot, which at the time required 48 minutes of actual programming. A signature of the show, especially in the later seasons, were frequent over-the-top freeway pileups. For filming many chases scenes were done on the back roads.

The show was created by Rick Rosner, and starred Erik Estrada as macho, rambunctious Officer Francis ("Frank") Llewellyn "Ponch" Poncherello and Larry Wilcox as his straitlaced partner, Officer Jonathan ("Jon") Andrew Baker. With Ponch the more trouble-prone of the pair, and Jon generally the more level-headed one trying to keep him out of trouble with the duo's gruff yet fatherly immediate supervisor Sergeant Joseph Getraer (Robert Pine), the two were Highway Patrolmen of the Central Los Angeles office of the California Highway Patrol (CHP, hence the name CHiPs).

As real-life CHP motor officers rarely ride in pairs, in early episodes this was explained away by placing the trouble-prone Ponch on probationary status with Jon assigned as his field training officer. Eventually, by the end of the first season, this subplot faded away (Ponch completed his probation) as audiences were used to seeing the two working as a team.

== Cast ==
The cast of CHiPs (from left: Erik Estrada as "Ponch", Robert Pine as Getraer, and Larry Wilcox as Jon)

- Larry Wilcox as Officer/Captain Jonathan "Jon" Andrew Baker (1977–1982, 1998)
- Erik Estrada as Officer Francis "Frank Ponch" Poncherello
- Robert Pine as Sergeant/Commissioner Joseph "Joe" Getraer
- Lew Saunders as Officer Gene Fritz (1977–1979)
- Brodie Greer as Officer Barry "Bear" Baricza (1977–1982)
- Paul Linke as Officer/Detective Arthur "Artie Grossie" Grossman
- Lou Wagner as Harlan Arliss, Automobile/Motorcycle Mechanic, CHP (1978–1983)
- Brianne Leary as Officer Sindy Cahill (1978–1979)
- Randi Oakes as Officer Bonnie Clark (1979–1982)
- Michael Dorn as Officer Jebediah Turner (1979–1982)
- Bruce Jenner as Officer Steve McLeish (1981–1982)
- Tom Reilly as Officer Robert "Bobby Hot Dog" Nelson (1982–1983)
- Tina Gayle as Officer Kathy Linahan (1982–1983)
- Bruce Penhall as Cadet/Officer/Sergeant Bruce Nelson (1982–1983, 1998)
- Clarence Gilyard Jr. as Officer Benjamin Webster (1982–1983)

=== Cast changes ===
In the fifth season (1981–82), Estrada went on strike over a dispute over syndication profits. As a result, he did not appear in three episodes; for that period he was replaced by Bruce Jenner (Officer Steve McLeish).

Despite their successful pairing on-screen, Wilcox and Estrada did not always get along behind the camera (though they later settled their differences and are now friends). Estrada managed to have producers fire Wilcox before the sixth and final season. Wilcox was replaced by Tom Reilly (Officer Bobby Nelson).

Bruce Penhall, a native of Balboa Island, Newport Beach, and a motorcycle speedway rider who had won the 1981 and 1982 Speedway World Championships, was also introduced as cadet–probationary officer Bruce Nelson, Bobby's younger brother in 1982–83. The season 6 episode "Speedway Fever" (aired November 7, 1982) centered on Nelson winning the 1982 Speedway World Final at the Los Angeles Memorial Coliseum, with scenes filmed in the pits during the meeting. The episode also used television coverage of the final, with dubbed commentary. Penhall later admitted that having a bodyguard and having to have makeup done in the pits in full view of his competitors at the World Final only added to the pressure he was under both as a rider and a rookie actor and that it felt weird having to "buddy up to Ponch" in front of the other riders while the World Final was taking place. In order to become a full-time member of the CHiPs cast, Penhall had officially announced his retirement from speedway racing on the podium of the 1982 World Final.

== Production ==
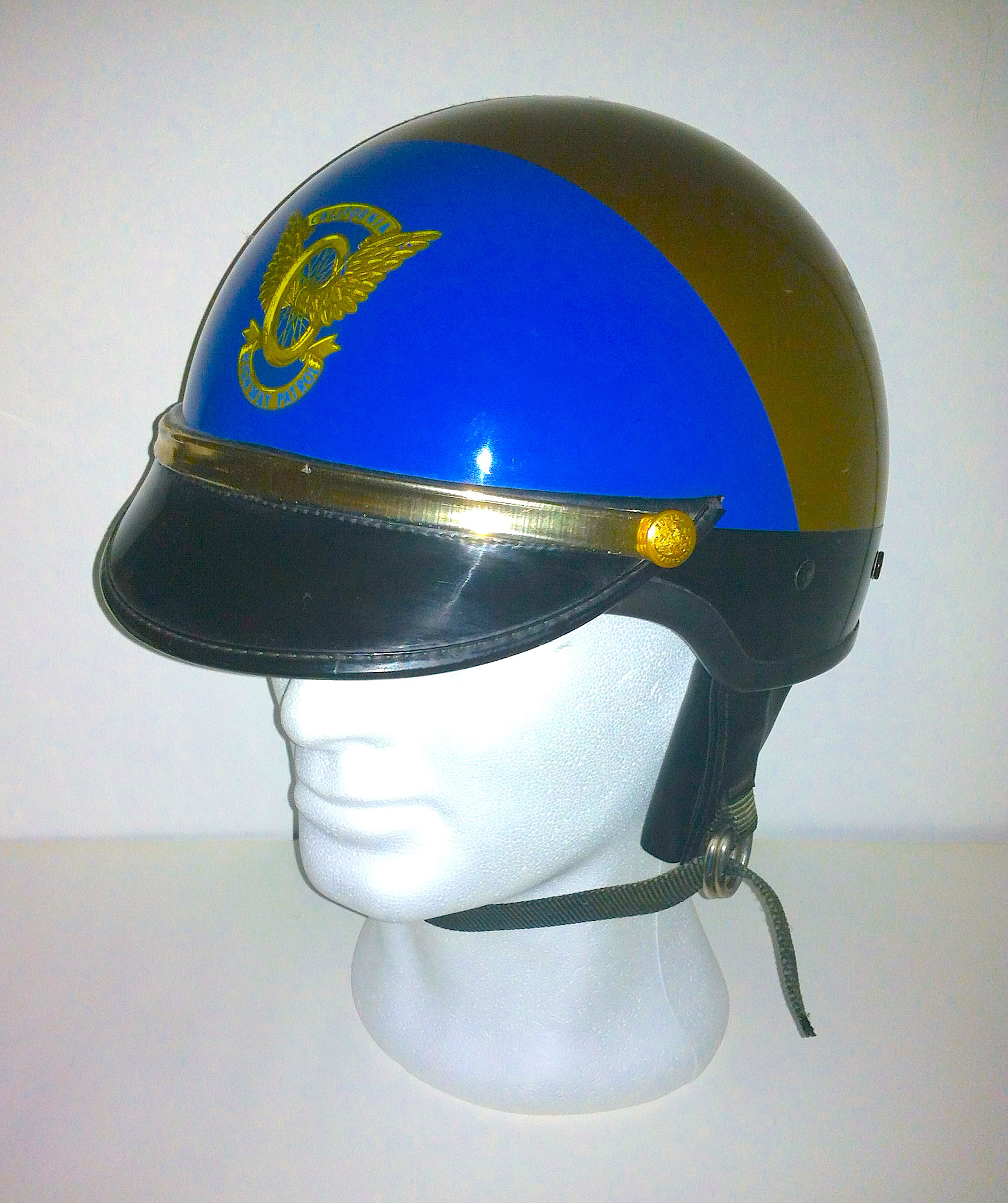
California Highway Patrol, "CHiPs" era, motor officer helmet

According to a 1998 TV Guide article, show creator Rick Rosner was a reserve deputy with the Los Angeles County Sheriff's Department. During a coffee break on an evening patrol shift in the mid-1970s he saw two young CHP officers on motorcycles which gave him the idea for this series. He later created 240-Robert, which contained elements of both of CHiPs and Emergency!. Episodes occasionally mention Jon Baker's service in Vietnam. This makes his character one of the earliest regular (and one of the more positive) portrayals of a Vietnam veteran on television. Larry Wilcox himself served 13 months in Vietnam as a Marine artilleryman.

Production made use of freeways in the Los Angeles area that had been recently completed but were not yet opened to the public. For season 1, the intersection of Interstate 210 and California State Route 2 in La Canada Flintridge was used often (along with a short stretch of Highway 2). For season 2, a section of Interstate 210 five miles to the west in La Crescenta, California, was used, until it too was opened to the public. For seasons 3 – 5, the filming location was moved another 10 miles to the west, to the intersection of the Interstate 210 and California State Route 118 in Sylmar, California. When that section of freeway was finally opened, production shifted again to a short section of the 710 Long Beach Freeway in Long Beach, California, as well as a long stretch of Pershing Drive, near Los Angeles International Airport. The only time production moved out of Los Angeles was for the episode Drive, Lady, Drive and used the Riverside International Raceway in Moreno Valley for the racing scenes.

Motor officers in CHiPs rode Kawasaki Z1-P and Z900-C2 police motorcycles in seasons 1 and 2, and KZ1000-C1 motorcycles from season 3 onwards. Despite the Ford Motor Company's credit as a vehicle provider for four of the series' six seasons, cars and trucks were supplied by several manufacturers. All police cars were made by Dodge as they were actual CHP cruisers bought at police auction for the show. CHP cruisers used included the 1973 Dodge Polara, 1976 Dodge Coronet, and 1975 and 1977 Dodge Monaco. In the third-season episode, Hot Wheels (episode 8) the show featured AMC Matador police cars in a one-off appearance.

Wilcox and Estrada did a great deal of their own motorcycle riding and performed many smaller stunts themselves, though doubles were used for far-off shots and various stunt or action sequences. Although Wilcox emerged relatively injury-free, Estrada suffered various injuries several times throughout the run of the series. In several early first-season episodes, a huge bruise or scab can be seen on his arm after he was flung from one of the motorcycles and skidded along the ground. His worst accident came when he was seriously injured while filming a season three episode in August 1979, fracturing several ribs and breaking both wrists. The accident and Estrada's subsequent hospitalization was incorporated into the series' storyline. Estrada had no experience with motorcycles prior to being cast in CHiPs, and underwent an intensive eight-week course learning how to ride. In 2007 it was revealed that he did not hold a motorcycle license at the time CHiPs was in production, and only qualified for a license after three attempts while preparing for an appearance on the reality television show Back to the Grind.

NBC aired reruns of this series on its 1982 daytime schedule from April 26 to September 10. During the original run of the series, syndicated reruns of older episodes were retitled CHiPs Patrol to avoid confusion. Later syndicated reruns after the show went out of production reverted to the original title.

== Episodes ==
Season	Episodes	Originally released	
Season	Episodes	First released	Last released
1	22	September 15, 1977	April 1, 1978
2	23	September 16, 1978	May 12, 1979
3	24	September 22, 1979	March 30, 1980
4	21	September 21, 1980	May 17, 1981
5	27	October 4, 1981	May 23, 1982
6	22	October 10, 1982	May 1, 1983
Television film		October 27, 1998	

CHiPs episodes were usually a combination of light comedy and drama. A typical episode would start with Ponch and Jon on routine patrol or being assigned to an interesting beat, such as Malibu or the Sunset Strip. In roll call briefing, Sgt. Getraer would alert his officers to be on the lookout for a particular criminal operation, such as people staging accidents as part of an insurance scam, or punks breaking into cars. A few interesting, unrelated vignettes often transpired during "routine" traffic enforcement.

A light-hearted subplot would also be included, such as Harlan trying to hide a stray dog from Getraer at the office. A more serious theme, such as Ponch trying to keep a kid from his old neighborhood out of a potential life of crime, might also be included. After a few failed attempts to apprehend the gang that had been menacing L.A.'s freeways, the episode would invariably culminate in Ponch and Jon leading a chase of the suspects (often assisted by other members of their division), climaxing with a spectacular series of stunt vehicle crashes.

The show then typically featured a dénouement of Ponch and Jon participating in a new activity (such as jet skiing or skydiving), designed to showcase the pair's glamorous Southern California lifestyle. Often, Ponch would attempt to impress a woman he had met during the episode with his athletic prowess or disco dancing, only to fail and provide Jon, Getraer, and others with many laughs. As the preliminary end credits would start, the image would freeze multiple times, showing various characters laughing or otherwise enjoying the social scene.

== Broadcast history ==
(all times Eastern/Pacific Time; subtract one hour for Central/Mountain Time)

- September 1977 – March 1978: NBC Thursday, 8–9PM
- April 1978: NBC Saturday, 8–9PM
- May – August 1978: NBC Thursday, 8–9PM
- September 1978 – March 1980: NBC Saturday, 8–9PM
- March 1980 – March 1983: NBC Sunday, 8–9PM
- April – May 1983: NBC Sunday, 7–8PM
- May – July 1983: NBC Sunday, 8–9PM

NBC aired reruns of the series weekdays at 3PM EST between April 26, 1982 and September 10, 1982.

In the United Kingdom, the series was broadcast by ITV but was not screened nationally. The series started in January 1979 in the London region, but began with season two (the first episode shown was episode 2x02 "The Volunteers") by February most other ITV regions originally screened in the Saturday teatime slot around 17:35 but moved to the Sunday teatime slot in 1980. By 1981, as with many imported programmes of the era, the series was being broadcast at different times during the weekend throughout the year by the different ITV regions. The series shared its Saturday teatime slot with other series such as The A-Team, Knight Rider, Magnum, P.I., and Whiz Kids. During 1984, most ITV stations continued with the Saturday teatime slot except for Anglia Television, Scottish Television (STV) and Television South West (TSW), who broadcast episodes during the weekend mornings or Sunday afternoons. By early 1985, the series was being broadcast during Saturday mornings by Anglia, Central, Grampian, Granada, STV and Tyne Tees. In other regions it had a Saturday lunchtime slot of 13:20 where, from September 1985, it rotated the slot with episodes of Airwolf. Most ITV areas completed the series by 1986, while LWT, TVS, and TSW finished series six in 1987 after starting in 1985. A few companies repeated the series in 1987.

The entire series was shown in New Zealand on TVNZ from 1978. The Seven Network broadcast the series in Australia in its entirety, with one episode per week and usually in the prime 7.30PM timeslot.

The show aired on MeTV from December 19, 2013 to May 26, 2017. The show currently airs on Charge! as of September 4, 2018.

== Home media ==
Warner Home Video released the first two seasons of CHiPs on DVD in Regions 1, 2, and 4 between 2007 and 2008. On March 3, 2015 (over six years later), the third season was released on DVD in Region 1. The fourth season was released in Region 1 on March 15, 2016. The fifth season was released in Region 1 on March 14, 2017. The sixth season and the complete series were released in Region 1 on June 6, 2017.

All 139 episodes are at the iTunes Store.

DVD title	No. of episodes	Release dates		
DVD title	No. of episodes	Region 1	Region 2 (UK)	Region 4
The Complete First Season	22	June 5, 2007	August 20, 2007	September 6, 2007
The Complete Second Season	23	June 3, 2008	September 22, 2008	September 3, 2008
The Complete Third Season	23	March 3, 2015	TBA	TBA
The Complete Fourth Season	21	March 15, 2016	TBA	TBA
The Complete Fifth Season	27	March 14, 2017	TBA	TBA
The Complete Sixth Season	22	June 6, 2017	TBA	TBA
The Complete Series	139	June 6, 2017	TBA	TBA

== Other media ==
=== CHiPs '99 ===
CHiPs
- Film poster
- Also known as: CHiPs '99
- Genre: Crime; Drama
- Written by: Morgan Gendel
- Directed by: Jon Cassar
- Starring: Larry Wilcox; Erik Estrada; Robert Pine; Paul Korver; David Ramsey; Brodie Greer; Bruce Penhall; Paul Linke; Judge Judy Sheindlin
- Music by: Stacy Widelitz
- Country of origin: United States
- Original language: English

Production
- Executive producer: Rick Rosner
- Producers: Erik Estrada; Christopher Morgan; Larry Wilcox
- Production location: California
- Cinematography: David Geddes
- Editor: Ron Spang
- Running time: 94 minutes
- Production company: Turner Pictures

Original release
- Network: TNT
- Release: October 27, 1998

CHiPs '99 is a 1998 American made-for-television crime drama film and a sequel to the series. It was directed by Jon Cassar. Several cast members from the original series reprise their roles. Original cast with promotions were Jon Baker as a captain and Joe Getraer as the CHP Commissioner. Other original cast members were Officer Frank Poncherello returning from a 15-year hiatus from the CHP, Officer Barry Baricza and Arthur (Artie) "Grossie" Grossman as a Detective. Bruce Penhall also returns as newly promoted Sergeant Bruce Nelson.

- Larry Wilcox as Captain Jonathan "Jon" A. Baker
- Erik Estrada as Officer Francis Llewelyn "Frank Ponch" Poncherello
- Robert Pine as CHP Commissioner Joseph "Joe" Getraer
- Paul Korver as Officer Peter Roulette
- David Ramsey as Officer Sergeant McFall
- Brodie Greer as Officer Barry "Bear" Baricza
- Bruce Penhall as Officer/Sergeant Bruce Nelson
- Paul Linke as Detective Arthur "Artie Grossie" Grossman
- Claudette Mink as Monica
- Judge Judy Sheindlin as Herself

=== Feature film ===
A film remake was released on March 24, 2017, with Dax Shepard co-producing with Andrew Panay, writing, directing and starring as Officer Jon Baker, Michael Peña as Frank "Ponch" Poncherello and Vincent D'Onofrio as the film's villain.

=== Merchandise ===
A series of 8 inch and 3 3/4 inch action figures was released by Mego in the late 1970s. Due to the materials used to construct the figures, many of them have discolored (typically turning green) or started to decompose over the years, making good conditioned examples quite hard to find on the collectors market. There was also a series of six die-cast model vehicles produced by Imperial Toys.

In the UK, as was common with many popular American series of the era, a series of tie-in annuals were produced by World International Publishing Ltd, containing stories, photos, puzzles and features on the stars. There are four annuals in total, one each for 1980–83.. A comic strip adaptation was drawn by Jim Baikie for Look-In magazine.

In 2006, a limited edition soundtrack was released on CD by Turner Classic Movies' music division via Film Score Monthly, featuring the original recordings of the main theme by John Parker (Parker's theme replaced an unused composition by Mike Post and Pete Carpenter, who scored the pilot) and in-episode musical scores from many episodes of the second season, as composed and conducted by Alan Silvestri, the series' primary (and from seasons three to five sole) composer until the final season. Silvestri also arranged the theme as heard from season two onwards, and it is this version that is heard here‍—‌the soundtrack album also includes the "Trick or Treat" score composed and conducted by Bruce Broughton, his only work for the series. In 2008, music from the third season was released; an album of music from the fourth season followed in 2010.
