= True Blood (film) =

- Directed by: Frank Kerr
- Written by: Frank Kerr
- Produced by: Peter Maris
- Starring: Jeff Fahey; Chad Lowe; Sherilyn Fenn
- Cinematography: Mark Morris
- Edited by: Michael Haight
- Music by: Scott Roewe
- Production companies: Fries Distribution Company; Maris Entertainment Group
- Distributed by: Fries Entertainment
- Release date: April 28, 1989
- Country: United States
- Language: English

True Blood is a 1989 American action-drama film written and directed by Frank Kerr and starring Jeff Fahey, Chad Lowe and Sherilyn Fenn.

== Plot ==
Teenager Ray Trueblood (Fahey) is wrongfully accused of murdering a police officer after his fellow gang member Billy Masters (Drago) does the deed. Hoping to elude the police, he flees Brooklyn, NY and joins the U.S. Marines. Returning 10 years later, Trueblood is dismayed to learn that his younger brother Donny (Lowe) is now running with a gang led by Masters. Trueblood soon finds himself depending on his military training & experience to protect his friends and family from the ruthless Masters.

== Cast ==
- Jeff Fahey as Raymond Trueblood
- Chad Lowe as Donny Trueblood
- Sherilyn Fenn as Jennifer Scott
- James Tolkan as Det. Joseph Hanley
- Ken Foree as Det. Charlie Gates
- Billy Drago as Billy 'Spider' Masters
- Brodie Greer as Det. Tony Williams
- John Capodice as Frank Santos
- Leon Addison Brown as Roach
- Stanley Perryman as Blade
- Everett Mendes III as Bobby Gaines
- Shawn O'Neil as Woody McCaffrey
- Robert LaSardo as Luis
