= Kawasaki police motorcycles =

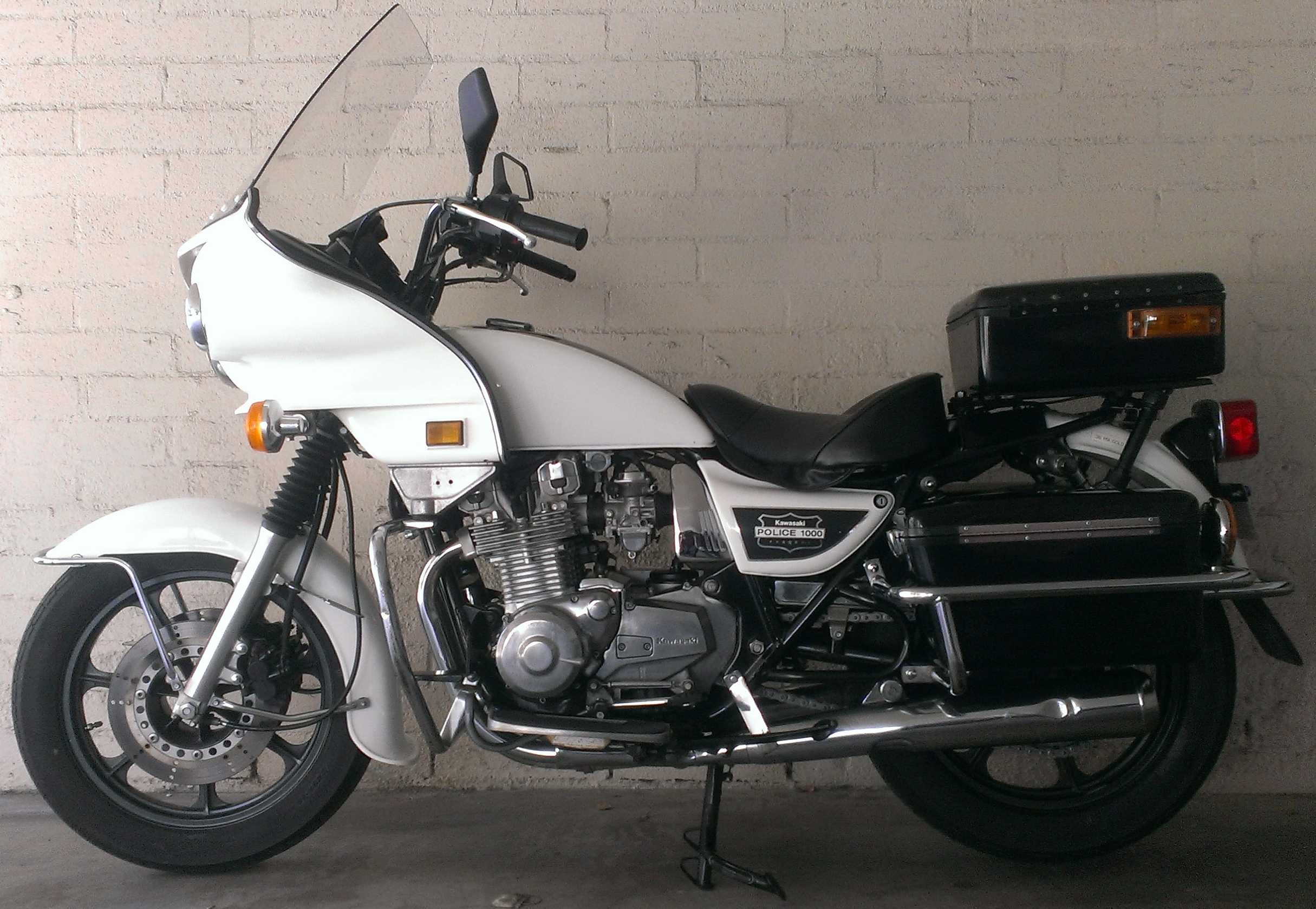
2002 Kawasaki KZ1000p

Kawasaki police motorcycles have been produced in four series:

- Z1-P – A 1975 Kawasaki Z1 900 cc motorcycle, modified through the addition of a shop-installed kit, then in 1976 available factory-built as a police motorcycle
- KZ900 Police Special – The 1977 KZ900 motorcycle, upgraded for use as a police motorcycle
- KZ1000C Police – The first built-for-law-enforcement model, intended to compete with the Harley-Davidson, 1978 – 1981
- KZ1000P Police – The most common model, 1982 – 2005, commonly known as the KZP

All series have been equipped with windshields, saddleboxes, pursuit lights, and folding floorboards rather than footpegs. All are a single-rider version of the Universal Japanese Motorcycle design popular until the advent of specialized motorcycle designs divided the market into cruisers, sport bikes, touring bikes and other specialized applications. All series are also designed to carry radio communications equipment and are wired for electronic sirens.

All have inline, 4-cylinder, normally-aspirated four-stroke, double overhead-cam engines and chain drives, and larger generating systems than similar civilian models. C- and P-series Police Specials were also equipped with tires designed to stay on the rim in case of deflation. These run-flat tires, supplied by Dunlop, were able to increase safety significantly by enabling the rider to safely slow to a stop if the tires are damaged in a high-speed pursuit. However, the very thick sidewalls on run-flat tires transmit a much greater level of road shock to the handlebars, increasing rider fatigue; and also generated excess friction/heat which resulted in above average tire wear, prompting operating agencies to migrate to standard high-performance tires. As a result, Dunlop discontinued production of the run-flats. The most popular replacement tires are provided by Metzeler.

== Model differences ==
The most obvious difference between the KZP and the earlier series was the addition of a fiberglass fairing, to which the front pursuit lights and windshield were mounted. The fairing also has two covered pockets for storage of small items. Due to the unique shape of the fairing, this has become the most identifiable police-service motorcycle design in the world. Earlier Kawasaki police motorcycles had a windshield with a shape similar to that found on the older Harley-Davidson Electra Glide motorcycle, then popular with law enforcement.

The C-series borrowed features from the American police motorcycles with which it was designed to compete. These included a spring-cushioned saddle, and a speedometer equipped with a solenoid to trap the indicator needle against the glass when the pursuit lights were activated, to mark the speed at which a lawbreaker was traveling at the time. Both of these features were eliminated in the KZP, which was equipped with a standard speedometer and tachometer.

The engine was updated in 1981 from the Z1 type with a displacement of 1015 cc to the "J model" type with a displacement of 998 cc. Although similar in appearance not all parts are interchangeable between the two types.

Mechanically, there were few changes within the series. The KZP has over 95% parts compatibility across the entire production run, and in fact the throttle twist assembly, which holds the switches for the pursuit lights and siren, kept the "M" position used by the C-series to lock the speedometer needle despite the P-series having a tachometer in place of the second speedometer. Despite this, the pin and wire for the "M" position are missing on the P-Series, so while the P-series throttle twist assembly will plug into the C-series harness and work just fine, the functionality for locking the second speedometer is lost when using the P-series throttle twist assembly on a C-series bike. There is no loss of functionality in the other direction, but the "M" position wire has no function on the P-series regardless of which model's throttle twist assembly is used. Another major change was in 2002, when the chain size was changed from 630 to 530, saving weight and increasing acceleration.

The most obvious change in the P-series was the introduction of LED lighting in 2003.

== Production run and specifications ==
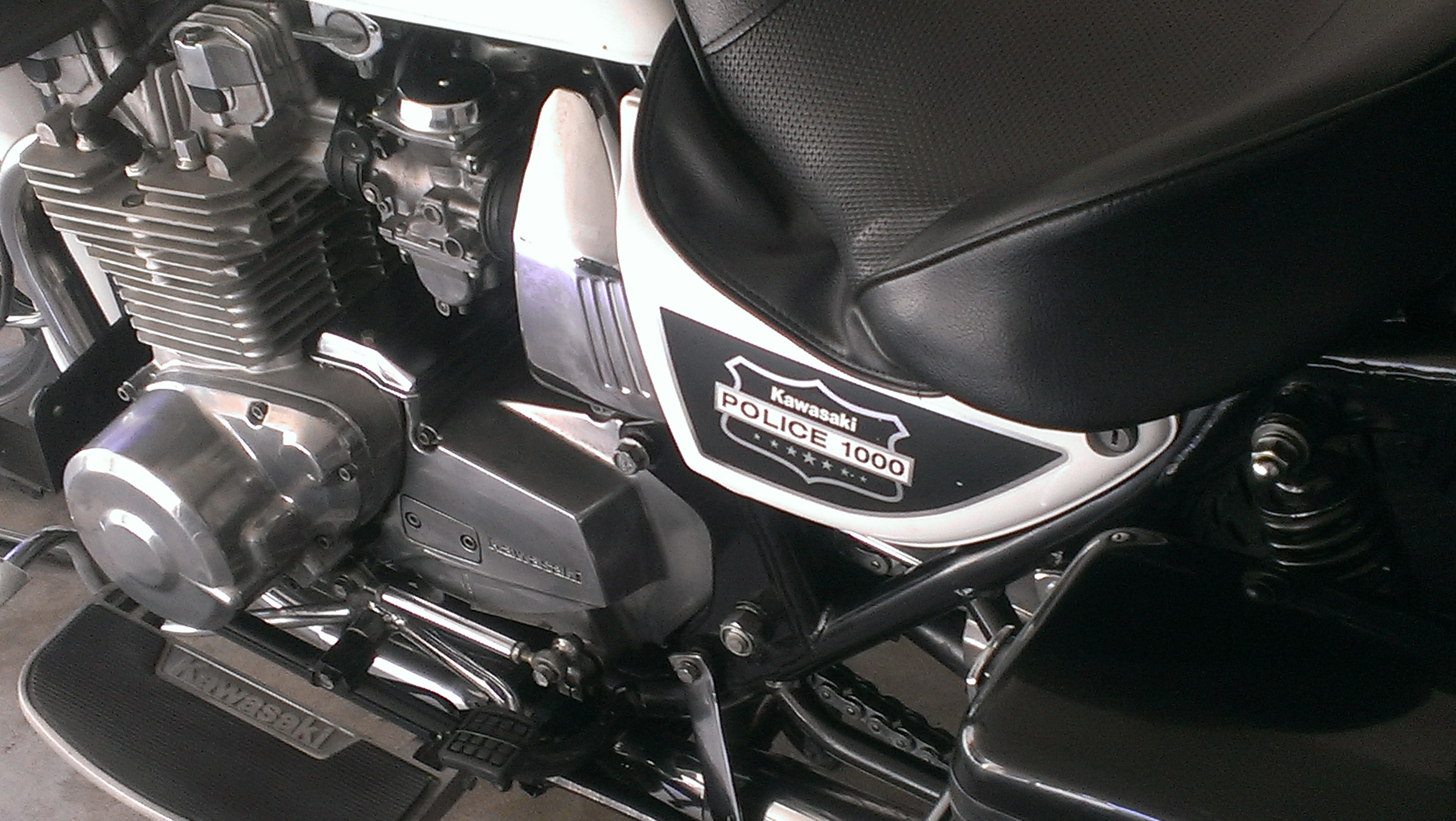
Left side 2002 KZ1000p showing engine, left footboard, seat, carburetors and side panel.

Kawasaki produced Police Specials for the North American market in a plant in Lincoln, Nebraska, with the last one built in September, 2005. They remained in service with major law enforcement agencies for years afterward, and became the motorcycle of choice for firms providing funeral and VIP motor-escort services.

- Engine type: 4-stroke, DOHC in-line four, 2 valves per cylinder
- Displacement: 998 cc (60.9 cu in)
- Starting: Electric
- Bore x Stroke: 69.4 mm × 66.0 mm (2.73 in × 2.60 in)
- Compression: 9.2:1
- Cooling: Air/Oil
- Power: 102 hp (76 kW) @ 8,500 rpm
- Torque: 67 lbf⋅ft (91 N⋅m) @ 7,000 rpm
- Carburetion: Mikuni Bs34 × 4
- Ignition: Transistor Controlled Breakerless Ignition ( TCBI )
- Transmission: 5-speed
- Frame : Double cradle, heavy-duty steel
- Rake / trail: 27.0 degrees / 4.5 inches (110 mm)
- Suspension: front 38 mm telescopic hydraulic fork
- Suspension: rear Swing arm with twin adjustable shocks
- Tire: front bead retention type MN 90-18 4PR
- Tire: rear bead retention type MR 90-18 4PR
- Brakes front, rear: Dual hydraulic discs / Single disc
- Overall length: 90.1 inches (2,290 mm)
- Overall width: 35.2 inches (890 mm)
- Overall height: 60.4 inches (1,530 mm)
- Ground clearance: 6.3 inches (160 mm)
- Seat height: 30.7 inches (780 mm)
- Curb weight, as from factory with fuel: 595 lb (270 kg)

== Kawasaki Concours 14 ==
In some countries the Concours 14 (also known as the 1400GTR) is used by the police, although this is not factory-built by Kawasaki as an authorities machine, rather it is a local conversion. In the United States, starting in 2009, the Concours 14P and the Police 1400 Enforcer have been adopted by a number of law enforcement agencies.

The new Kawasaki police motorcycle directly competes with patrol motorcycles based on the BMW R1200RT, Harley-Davidson models, and Honda ST1300. Operators include the California Highway Patrol, Los Angeles Police Department, and other major agencies, primarily throughout the western United States. The dealers stopped building new Concours 14Ps after a number of electrical failures took 268 bikes out of service for repairs.
