= Brodie Greer =

American actor

- Born: Brodie Haldeman Greer; October 26, 1949 (age 76); Santa Monica, California, U.S.
- Occupation: Actor
- Years active: 1977–1999

Brodie Haldeman Greer (born October 26, 1949) is a former American actor, best known for his role as Officer Barry "Bear" Baricza on CHiPs.

== Early life ==
Greer was raised in Pacific Palisades, Los Angeles, California. He studied at Santa Monica Junior College and San Jose State University. At San Jose State, Greer played at safety for the San Jose State Spartans football team from 1969 to 1971.

== Career ==
Greer's first major role was on Days of Our Lives, but his most notable role was Officer Barry "Bear" Baricza on CHiPs. Greer appeared in 53 episodes between 1977 and 1982, he also reprised his role in the reunion special CHiPs '99.

Greer was a feature player in The Love Boat episode "Abby's Maiden Voyage", which aired February 26, 1983.

In 2010 Greer went into semi-retirement. Today, Greer coaches volleyball and basketball for middle and high schools in Carmel, California.

== Filmography ==
- CHiPs (1977-1982, TV Series) - Officer Barry Baricza
- Death Flash (1986) - Carl Sloan
- Terror Squad (1988) - Capt. Steiner
- True Blood (1989) - Det. Tony Williams
- Ministry of Vengeance (1989) - Whiteside's Liaison
- CHiPs '99 (1998) (TV movie) - Barry 'Bear' Baricza
