= Rhapsody =

Rhapsody may refer to:

== Ancient Greece ==
- A work of epic poetry, or part of one, that is suitable for recitation at one time
  - Rhapsode, a classical Greek professional performer of epic poetry

== Computer software ==
- Rhapsody (online music service), later rebranded Napster, an online music store subscription service
- Rhapsody (operating system), the code name for the Apple Macintosh operating system that eventually evolved into Mac OS X
- Rhapsody (modeling), a UML and SysML software tool from IBM for developing embedded and real-time systems

== Music ==
- Rhapsody (music), an episodic instrumental composition of indefinite form
- Rhapsody (Ashton), a ballet by Frederick Ashton based on a Rachmaninoff rhapsody
- Rhapsody (John Ireland), a 1915 piano composition by John Ireland
- Rhapsody (operetta), an operetta by Fritz Kreisler (music) and John La Touche (lyrics)
- Rhapsody (Osborne), a composition by Willson Osborne
- Rhapsodies, Op. 79 (Brahms), a solo piano piece
- Rhapsody (online music service), a digital music streaming and download service
- "Rhapsody", a 1988 song by Siouxsie and the Banshees from Peepshow

=== Performers ===
- Rhapsody (girl group), an Australian female duo
- Rhapsody of Fire (formerly Rhapsody), an Italian metal band
  - Luca Turilli's Rhapsody, a project split off from Rhapsody of Fire
  - Turilli / Lione Rhapsody
- Rapsody (Marlanna Evans), American rapper

=== Albums ===
- Rhapsody (Ahmad Jamal album), 1966
- Rhapsody (Ben E. King album), 1976
- Rhapsody (Mr. Mike album), 1999
- Rhapsodies (album), by Rick Wakeman, 1979
- Rapsodies, by Vangelis and Irene Papas, 1986
- Rhapsody, by Bonnie Bianco, 1987

== Other culture ==
- Rhapsody (film), a 1954 film based on the novel Maurice Guest and directed by Charles Vidor
- Rhapsody (comics), a Marvel Comics character
- Rhapsody: Child of Blood (1999), the first novel in Elizabeth Haydon's fantasy series, the Symphony of Ages
- Rhapsody (video game series), a video game series
- Rhapsody (TV series), a Canadian music television series
- Rhapsody (magazine), one of United Airlines' inflight magazines
- "Rhapsody", a storyline in the science fiction comedy webtoon series Live with Yourself!
- Rhapsody, one of the pilots of the Angel Interceptors in Captain Scarlet
- Rhapsodiae, a body of work ascribed to the legendary musician and prophet Orpheus

== Other uses ==
- Rhapsody (climb), a traditional climbing route on Dumbarton Rock in Scotland
- MS Rhapsody of the Seas, a Vision Class cruise ship for Royal Caribbean International
- MS Golden Iris, a cruise ship formerly owned by MSC Cruises as MS Rhapsody
- Rapsodie, experimental nuclear reactor in France
- RAPSODEE, a laboratory at one of France's Grand Ecoles, École des mines d'Albi-Carmaux
- Rhapsody, an annual student fest of Medical College Kolkata

== See also ==
- Rapsodia (disambiguation)
- American Rhapsody (disambiguation)
- Bohemian Rhapsody (disambiguation)
- Rhapsody in Blue (disambiguation)
