= Hollywood Animal =

2004 book by Joe Eszterhas

- Author: Joe Eszterhas
- Language: English
- Genre: Memoir
- Publication date: 2004

Hollywood Animal is a 2004 memoir by screenwriter, author and journalist Joe Eszterhas. It focuses on his childhood in refugee camps in Europe, moving to the US, growing up in Cleveland and working as a journalist for Rolling Stone magazine. It also covers his time in Hollywood, the breakup of his first marriage and his battle against throat cancer.

It includes stories of the making of many of his films such as F.I.S.T., Flashdance, Jagged Edge and Basic Instinct.
