= Hotel Julien Dubuque =

Hotel in Dubuque, Iowa, US

- Julien Motor Inn
- U.S. Historic district – Contributing property
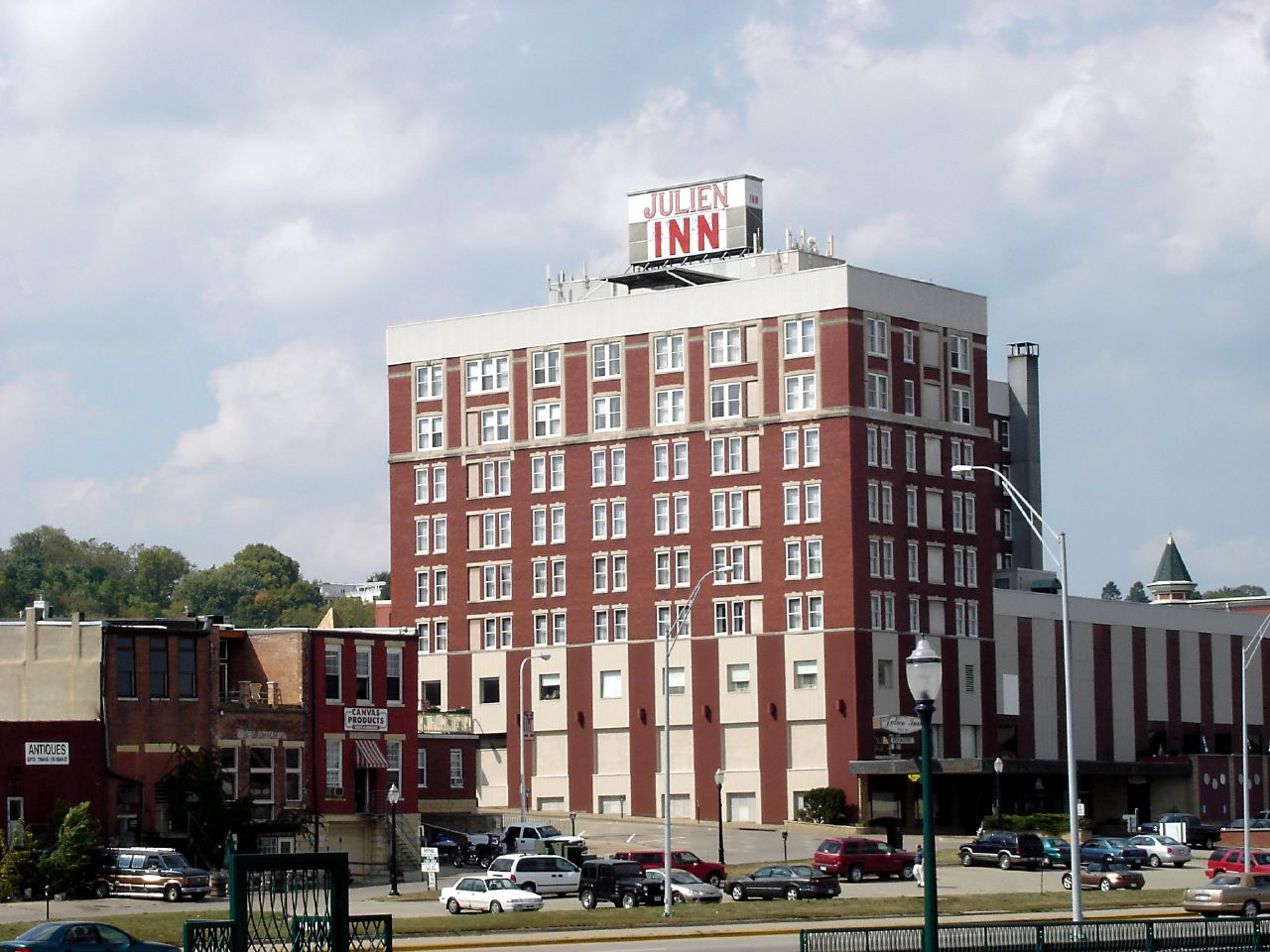

- Location within Iowa Location within the United States
- Location: 200 Main St. Dubuque, Iowa
- Coordinates: 42°29′46.7″N 90°39′52.2″W
- Built: 1915
- Part of: Old Main Street Historic District (ID83000356)
- Added to NRHP: January 12, 1983

The Hotel Julien Dubuque is a hotel located in downtown Dubuque, Iowa at Second and Main streets. The hotel currently has 133 guest rooms, Caroline's restaurant, the Riverboat Lounge, the Potosa Spa, a pool and fitness center, and large banquet facilities. The interior redesign converted the existing 168 guest rooms into 133 luxury rooms and suites and restored the historic lobby and grand ballroom, while at the same time adding modern systems and amenities like a geothermal heating and cooling system, a reflective roof, a swimming pool and fitness facility. It was included as a contributing property in the Old Main Street Historic District in 1983 as the Julien Motor Inn.

== History ==
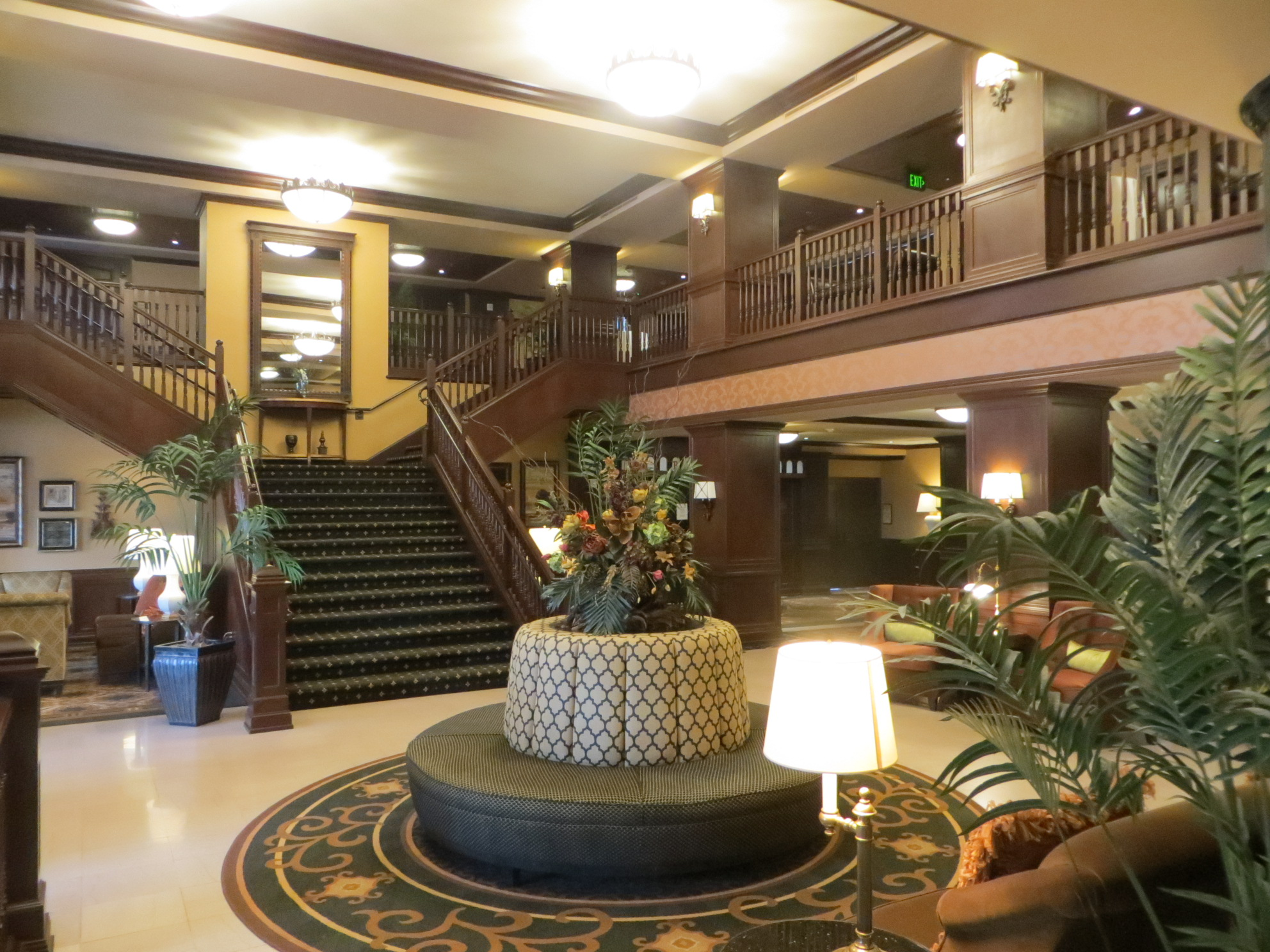
Hotel lobby

The history of the Hotel Julien Dubuque can be traced back to 1839, when the first lodging establishment was built at Second and Main streets. At first, the hotel was called the Waples House. The Waples House was known for fine dining and extravagant furnishings. In 1854 the hotel was renamed the Julien House. The hotel was enlarged and refurbished. It's believed that Abraham Lincoln stayed at the Julien House when he traveled to Galena, Illinois to attend to legal matters there. During the late 1800s, the hotel became a focal point of downtown Dubuque.

In 1913, the Julien House was destroyed by a fire - very little was left standing by the time the fire was over. Construction on the present building began soon after, and was completed in 1915.

During the time that Al Capone was the leader of the mob in Chicago, he reportedly owned the Julien. Capone supposedly had a fondness for Dubuque, and when he had trouble in Chicago Capone would come to Dubuque and use the Julien Inn as a retreat and hideout. Local lore says that he had an underground garage in the area in order to hide his personal cars so that he could better disguise his presence in the city.

Another famous guest of the Julien was Sylvester Stallone. Stallone stayed at the Julien Inn during the filming of the movie F.I.S.T.

Louis Pfohl eventually purchased the hotel, and remodeled the building. He was responsible for many of the features found in the hotel, such as the mirrored staircase leading from the lobby to the second floor.

The Julien Inn is currently owned by the Fischer Companies - a company that owns a number of buildings in Dubuque. In 2007, the Fischer Companies began further renovation, intending to restore the building's exterior to its original appearance, plus renovating the interior of the hotel. As part of the renovation, the hotel also received a new name: Hotel Julien Dubuque. The renovation is now complete and the hotel reopened in Summer 2009.
