= Jade (1995 film) =

1995 film by William Friedkin

- Theatrical release poster
- Directed by: William Friedkin
- Written by: Joe Eszterhas; William Friedkin (Note: Uncredited)
- Produced by: Robert Evans; Gary Adelson; Craig Baumgarten
- Starring: David Caruso; Linda Fiorentino; Chazz Palminteri; Michael Biehn; Richard Crenna
- Cinematography: Andrzej Bartkowiak
- Edited by: Augie Hess
- Music by: James Horner
- Distributed by: Paramount Pictures
- Release date: October 13, 1995
- Running time: 95 minutes
- Country: United States
- Language: English
- Budget: $50 million
- Box office: $9.9 million (United States)

Jade is a 1995 American erotic thriller film written by Joe Eszterhas, produced by Robert Evans, directed by William Friedkin, and starring David Caruso, Linda Fiorentino, Chazz Palminteri, Richard Crenna, and Michael Biehn. The original music score was composed by James Horner based on a song composed by Loreena McKennitt.

== Plot ==
Assistant District Attorney David Corelli is called to the murder scene of prominent businessman Kyle Medford, found skinned to death in his San Francisco home by an antique hatchet. Police detectives Bob Hargrove and Petey Vesko find photographs in Medford's safe of Governor Lew Edwards having sex with a prostitute, later identified as Patrice Jacinto. During questioning, Patrice reveals that she and several other women were paid by Medford to have sex with wealthy men at his beach house in Pacifica. She also informs them that the most desired prostitute among the clients was a woman known only as "Jade". In a private meeting with Governor Edwards and aide Bill Barrett, Corelli is warned not to release the photographs. Corelli is then almost killed when his brake line is deliberately cut and his vehicle crashes after losing control on a steep hill.

The detectives find fingerprints on the hatchet belonging to Katrina Gavin, a clinical psychologist and former lover of Corelli's who eventually married his close friend, defense attorney Matt Gavin. When interviewed, Katrina explains that Medford gave her a tour of his antique collection on the day in question, but claims to have nothing to do with his death. At Medford's beach house, Corelli and the detectives find various drugs, alcohol, and sex toys, as well as hidden video cameras. They conclude Medford was recording the sex sessions to blackmail the men. Corelli is shocked to discover Katrina on one of the tapes; the revelation renews the detectives' interest in her as a suspect.

Patrice arranges to meet Corelli at a restaurant to discuss Jade's identity, but she is murdered in a hit-and-run attack by an unknown assailant driving a black Ford Thunderbird. Corelli, witnessing the murder first-hand, chases the assailants' vehicle all the way to the docks, where the assailant rams Corelli's car into the sea and escapes. The detectives discover the Gavins own a similar Thunderbird, so suspect Katrina of killing Patrice, but then find the actual vehicle used in the hit-and-run abandoned, suggesting that someone is trying to frame Katrina. Katrina is again brought in for questioning and is shown the sex tape. Matt, in his capacity as her attorney, ends the interrogation before she fully explains her involvement. When confronted at their home, Katrina admits to her husband that she did have sex with the man on the tape, due in part to her knowledge of Matt's many affairs.

Katrina visits Corelli at his apartment and tries unsuccessfully to seduce him. She admits having felt sexually liberated by sleeping with several men at the beach house. Meanwhile, the only witness to identify Katrina at the Pacifica beach house, a man named Henderson, is found murdered. Corelli informs the detectives at the crime scene that Katrina could not have killed him because he was with her at the time. Back at his apartment, Corelli is confronted by Matt, who holds him at gunpoint and angrily accuses him of sleeping with Katrina. Corelli denies it and persuades Matt that his wife's life is in danger. They hurry to the Gavin home, where Det. Hargrove, Barrett, and Pat Callendar have come to kill Katrina and search for the incriminating photos of the governor. Callendar is shot by Matt, but Barrett manages to escape. In the meantime, Hargrove tries to rape and kill Katrina, but Corelli and Matt arrive, and Hargrove is shot by Matt.

Corelli goes to the governor for a guarantee of Katrina's safety by leveraging his possession of the photographs. The governor denies any knowledge of Hargrove or Callendar's actions, but insinuates they were both acting on his behalf. As she gets ready for bed at home, Katrina finds photographs laid out in her bathroom of her having sex at the beach house. Matt admits to Katrina that he killed Medford, certain that Medford eventually would blackmail them both. He then tells Katrina to "introduce me to Jade" the next time they "make love".

== Cast ==
- David Caruso as Assistant District Attorney David Corelli
- Linda Fiorentino as Anna Katrina Maxwell-Gavin / Jade
- Chazz Palminteri as Matt Gavin
- Richard Crenna as Governor Lew Edwards
- Michael Biehn as Detective Bob Hargrove
- Donna Murphy as Detective Karen Heller
- Ken King as Detective Petey Vasko
- Holt McCallany as Bill Barrett
- David Hunt as Detective Pat Callendar
- Angie Everhart as Patrice Jacinto
- Kevin Tighe as District Attorney Arnold Clifford
- Victor Wong as Mr. Wong
- Robin Thomas as Mr. Green
- Victoria Smith as Sandy
- Jay Jacobus as Justin Henderson
- Bud Bostwick as Henderson's Brother
- Darryl Chan as Tommy Loy
- Ron Ulstad as Kyle Medford
- Buddy Joe Hooker as Assistant District Attorney #1
- Bobby Bass as Assistant District Attorney #2
- Sandy Berumen as Assistant District Attorney #3
- Dick Ziker as Assistant District Attorney #4
- Ron Yuan as Technician

== Production ==
Warren Beatty was the first choice to play the role of David Corelli, but turned it down. After his sudden departure from NYPD Blue, David Caruso was hoping to break through with a film career and accepted the role. The part of Matt Gavin was offered to Kenneth Branagh, before Chazz Palminteri was eventually cast. Julia Roberts and Sharon Stone were considered to play Katrina Gavin, but both rejected it. Linda Fiorentino was then asked, but she originally turned it down because she did not want to play a prostitute, but changed her mind once her character was changed through rewrites.

According to Joe Eszterhas' autobiography, Hollywood Animal, William Friedkin changed the script so much that Eszterhas threatened to remove his name from the credits. He claimed Paramount settled by giving him a "blind script deal" worth $2–4 million.

In an interview in Linda Ruth Williams' book The Erotic Thriller in Contemporary Cinema, Friedkin admitted that he had virtually rewritten the script. Friedkin also said that Jade was the favorite of all the films he had made. He later wrote the movie had "a terrific cast. A wonderful script. Great locations. How could it miss?"

In a 2024 live stream, Adam Savage revealed one of the props from the film had appeared in the background of the second season of MythBusters. His cohost, Jamie Hyneman, worked with the special effects leader, Chris Walas, and kept the prop as he thought it would be funny to keep in the back. The prop was of a naked male character sliced and cut up so the crew covered his groin area and put a t shirt on to make it tv ready. Savage also revealed he is friends with the woman, Carol Bauman, who transported the prop from Northern California to Beverly Hills, where the scene was being shot. Due to its size, she transported it in a flatbed truck but wasn't covered so when she arrived in Beverly Hills, she had police following her in helicopters.

== Reception ==
=== Box office ===
The film, with an estimated production budget of $50 million, earned $9,851,610 at the North American domestic box office, taking in $4,284,246 in its opening weekend and ranking number five in the box-office charts.

=== Critical response ===
The film received negative reviews from critics. Rotten Tomatoes retrospectively collected 35 reviews and gave the film an approval score of 17%. The site's consensus reads: "An ostensible erotic thriller that's largely neither erotic nor thrilling, Jade marks one of several unfortunate low points for aggressively sexual mid-'90s cinema". On Metacritic, it has a score of 33% based on reviews from 27 critics, indicating "generally unfavorable" reviews. Audiences polled by CinemaScore gave the film an average grade of "C+" on an A+ to F scale. Gene Siskel singled the film out as the worst one he saw in 1995. In his print review, he described it as "a sad, raunchy thriller by William Friedkin [that's] just the kind of sick, pointless entertainment that Sen. Robert Dole was railing about. The conclusion is so confusing that even after it was reshot it makes little sense. Friedkin tries to juice the action with a desperate move—a San Francisco car chase."

Roger Ebert of the Chicago Sun-Times responded to Siskel's worst-of selection by mounting a very mild defense where he said that he didn't think the movie was amongst the worst of 1995, although he added that he gave it a thumbs-down grade on their show and said that the plot was incomprehensible; in his print review, published a week earlier than Siskel's, Ebert awarded it two out of four stars, and wrote: "There's only one character we can identify with - a San Francisco police detective played by David Caruso - and he doesn't drive the plot so much as get swept along by it." Brian Lowry of Variety called it: "A muddled mix of sex, political corruption and murder, Jade is a jigsaw puzzle that never puts all the pieces together." Janet Maslin of The New York Times wrote: "Though the combination of Linda Fiorentino, Chazz Palminteri and David Caruso promised Jade some fire, it winds up with no more spark than a doused campfire."

The film was also panned in San Francisco, where parts of it were filmed. Barbara Shulgasser of the San Francisco Examiner gave the film a one-and-a-half star rating and wrote:

I used to joke that I knew a movie was bad when I had to spend more time writing my review than the screenwriter spent working out the plot.

I can't predict how long this review will take me to write, but I assure you that I've already thought about Jade longer than writer Joe Eszterhas and director William Friedkin seem to have. There is no other explanation than thoughtlessness for what an incoherent, disjointed and unimaginative movie they've made.

For example, do we really need another flying car chase across the streets of San Francisco after Peter Yates staged the best one in Bullitt? And do we really need scenes in which dramatic tension not inherent in the story is manufactured by using such knee-jerk cliches as having a woman walk through a large, dark, empty house calling out, "Is anyone there?" while the camera follows her like a stalker? Yes, this movie gives you the creeps, but only in the most elementary, Pavlovian sense.

Local freelance writer Edward Guthmann praised the production design and location photography in his review for the San Francisco Chronicle, but wrote that "despite its posh trimmings, and Fiorentino's feline presence, Jade never rises above its limitations and never cloaks the fact that Eszterhas' dialogue and script are basically pulp—minus the trashy fun that we've come to expect from the genre."

Granted, Eszterhas shows an occasional knack for kick-in-the- pants repartee. When Crenna tells Caruso to drop his investigation, "unless you want as much of a future in this state as Jerry Brown," Caruso looks blank for a second and responds, "Who's Jerry Brown?"

More often, his dialogue deals in the moldy cliches of a hack B-movie.

When Palminteri lays down his philosophy to Caruso, for example, and says, "There's only three fun things in life, paisan: money, sex and power," you've got to wonder why Hollywood pays this guy $3 million per script.

=== Awards ===
It earned two Golden Raspberry Award nominations, for Worst Screenplay and Worst New Star (for Caruso, who was nominated for both Jade and Kiss of Death), but lost both categories to Showgirls, also written by Joe Eszterhas.

=== Other response ===
Friedkin admitted the film was "a critical and financial disaster", although it "contained some of my best work. I felt I had let down the actors, the studio, and most of all, Sherry (Sherry Lansing, his wife, an executive at Paramount). I went into a deep funk. Was it the Exorcist curse, as many have suggested, a poor choice of material, or simply that whatever talent I had was ephemeral? Maybe all of the above."

Michael Biehn was not fond of the film: "Well, on Jade, I had no idea what I was doing. I don't think anybody had any idea what they were doing. It was a Joe Eszterhas script. To me, none of it ever really made any sense. I didn't realize until the read-through that I was the bad guy in it. It was like a jumbled mess. And the movie came out a mess, too. It had great people on it, though. It had William Friedkin directing, it had Chazz Palmenteri, who was nominated that year for an Academy Award, it had Linda Fiorentino, who had just come out with that famous movie she did The Last Seduction, and it had David Caruso, who's a brilliant actor when given the right material, and a very smart guy. So a great cast, great director... everything but a script."

In a 2016 interview with The A.V. Club, Chazz Palminteri defended Jade despite its negative critical reception, stating, "I really like the movie a lot, and I'm glad it's become something of a cult item." He also recalled having a great experience working with William Friedkin, whom he described as a brilliant director, and praised his co-stars David Caruso and Linda Fiorentino.

In the book Unlikeable Female Characters: The Women Pop Culture Wants You To Hate, author Anna Bogutskaya mentions Fiorentino's character as meeting criteria for multiple archetypes of negatively portrayed women in popular media. Bogutskaya opines that the characterization of Anna / Jade contributed to her perception as hard to work with, referencing her personality conflict with Tommy Lee Jones in Men In Black, and ultimately culminating in her gradual exit from acting.

== Director's cut ==
An unrated "director's cut" version featuring additional scenes and more explicit sexual footage with an additional 12 minutes was later released to VHS, though it is now out of print; the theatrical cut was used for the subsequent DVD and Blu-ray editions. The planned unrated versions for DVD, LaserDisc, and Blu-ray were cancelled due to poor sales of the unrated VHS release, and the director's cut remained widely unavailable until 2025, when Vinegar Syndrome announced a Blu-ray and 4K UHD release.

In one alternate version of Jade, rather than having Gavin get away with murder, Corelli returns to the house, clearly planning to place him under arrest.

Cable channels USA, Cinemax, and WGN air the director's cut, including some scenes originally cut to avoid a possible NC-17 rating and for length.

== Bibliography ==
- Friedkin, William (April 16, 2013). The Friedkin Connection: A Memoir. HarperCollins. ISBN 9780062097262.
