= Joseph Ransohoff =

American neurosurgeon (1915–2001)

Joseph Ransohoff, 1992, AJNR

Joseph Ransohoff, III (July 1, 1915 – January 30, 2001) was a member of the Ransohoff family and a pioneer in the field of neurosurgery. In addition to training numerous neurosurgeons, his "ingenuity in adapting advanced technologies" saved many lives and even influenced the television program Ben Casey. Among other innovations, he created the first intensive care unit dedicated to neurosurgery, pioneered the use of medical imaging and catheterization in the diagnosis and treatment of brain tumors, and helped define the fields of pediatric neurosurgery and neuroradiology.

== Early life and education ==
Ransohoff was born to a Jewish family in Cincinnati, Ohio, son of Joseph Louis Ransohoff II, a surgeon who himself was the son of a surgeon. He received his undergraduate degree from Harvard University. While attending Harvard he briefly considered leaving the country in order to participate in the Spanish Civil War, motivated by his lifelong socialist sympathies. One of Ransohoff's favorite boasts was that he was the only student in the history of Harvard to graduate on parole. He later received his medical degree from the University of Chicago in 1941 and went on to become a surgery instructor at the University of Cincinnati, like his father and grandfather before him. Three years into his residency, he was drafted into the United States Army where he was taught neurosurgery. During the war, Ransohoff was present at both the Battle of Normandy and the Battle of the Bulge. In the course of his service, he personally befriended General George S. Patton, and became a fixture in the General's close circle of associates. Later in the war, Ransohoff was assigned to air evacuation centers in France and Germany.

== Career ==
After three years in the military, Ransohoff completed his residency at Montefiore Hospital. He went on to teach at Columbia University and practice surgery at the New York Neurologic Institute at Presbyterian Hospital. In 1962, Ransohoff was invited to become chairman of the Department of Neurosurgery at the New York University School of Medicine, a prestigious position he held for over thirty years. While in this capacity, he was famed for hosting a weekly spinal and neurosurgical gathering for doctors of the tri-state area of New York, New Jersey, and Connecticut to come and seek his advice on challenging cases. Ransohoff was part of the team at George Washington University Hospital that successfully operated on White House Press Secretary James Brady after the Secretary was shot in the 1981 Reagan assassination attempt. During his chairmanship at NYU, he was also known as an early and strong advocate of wider stem cell treatments.

In 1992, Dr. Ransohoff left New York University Hospital for Tampa, Florida, at the behest of the James A. Haley VA Hospital, which wanted to reform its neurosurgical department. Professionally he greatly improved the neurosurgical and spinal centers at the VA Hospital and Tampa General Hospital, and significantly added to the brain cancer research programs at Moffitt Cancer Center.

== Personal life and death ==
In 1940, he married Rita Meyer, a psychotherapist who wrote Venus After 40, a book about men's responses to sexuality in older women; they divorced in December 1983. In April, 1984, he married Lori Cohen (born 1956), a dentist; they had a son born in 1989.

Ransohoff died at his home on the morning of January 30, 2001 of natural causes.

== Legacy ==
The book Brain Surgeon: An Intimate View of His World (ISBN 0-8041-0957-5) by Lawrence Shainberg was based on his life. He also served as a consultant to the popular television series Ben Casey; some viewers familiar with Ransohoff feel that he and Casey have similar personalities. He was a cousin of director/producer Martin Ransohoff.
