= Physical Evidence =

1989 film directed by Michael Crichton

- Theatrical release poster
- Directed by: Michael Crichton
- Screenplay by: Bill Phillips
- Story by: Bill Phillips; Steve Ransohoff
- Produced by: Martin Ransohoff
- Starring: Burt Reynolds; Theresa Russell; Ned Beatty
- Cinematography: John A. Alonzo
- Edited by: Glenn Farr
- Music by: Henry Mancini
- Distributed by: Columbia Pictures
- Release date: January 27, 1989
- Running time: 99 minutes
- Country: United States
- Language: English
- Budget: $11-12 million
- Box office: $3.5 million

Physical Evidence is a 1989 American crime thriller film directed by Michael Crichton (in his final film as a director), and starring Burt Reynolds, Theresa Russell, and Ned Beatty. The film focuses on an alcoholic suspended police officer (Reynolds) charged with murder, and his representation by a female attorney (Russell) attempting to defend him.

== Plot ==
After parking his car and wearing a "Happy Now?" sign, a man finds extortionist Jake Farley lying under the bridge. He grabs his foot with the rope and discovers he is dead.

Meanwhile, beleaguered ex-police officer Joe Paris wakes up with a splitting headache and blood on his shirt after a night of drinking, and cannot recall events of the previous night. His blood is discovered on the murder weapon planted at the apartment and he is arrested by detectives. Public defender Jenny Hudson is assigned to meet and represent Joe. Investigating the case, Joe and Jenny arrive at the bar, where Joe meets Jake's son, Matt, who, believing Joe killed his father, has an employee tell them to leave. Joe and Jenny leave the bar, and see what seems to be a policeman watching them. They attempt to give chase, but a near head-on collision forces them to abandon their tail.

Deborah Quinn, with whom Joe was having an affair, tells Jenny that Joe was with her the night of the murder, but she fears her husband, Vincent, a violent crime boss. Joe, believing an old nemesis, Harry Norton, may be involved, tracks him down at his business. But it turns out Norton was out of the country with his new wife.

It is revealed at the trial that Farley was disliked by nearly everyone. Farley taped his conversations with people, including Joe, and many of the tapes contained incriminating evidence he was using to blackmail people, including police officers.

A convict named Tony Sklar contacts Jenny and tells her he has evidence that could clear Joe, but he would tell her only in exchange for a deal to lessen his sentence. She visits him in the hospital infirmary and tells her he was hired by Norton to kill Farley and his new wife, Celeste, who had been married to Norton, before Norton was incarcerated. Norton blamed Joe, who had arrested him when Joe was a police officer. Before a deal can be finalized, though, Norton has Sklar killed in prison.

However, Joe doctors a tape of Sklar to make Norton believe he is still alive. Norton comes to exact revenge and find Sklar, killing three police officers and shooting Joe, before finding Jenny. Norton confesses to arranging Farley's murder and pinning it on Joe, believing he could fulfill two vendettas at once. Jenny tells him that she can take him to Sklar. Jenny kills Norton and reunites with Joe outside the building.

== Cast ==
- Burt Reynolds as Joe Paris
- Theresa Russell as Jenny Hudson
- Ned Beatty as James Nicks
- Kay Lenz as Deborah Quinn
- Ted McGinley as Kyle
- Tom O'Brien as Matt Farley
- Kenneth Welsh as Harry Norton
- Ray Baker as Strickler
- Ken James as Hank Carruth
- Michael P. Moran as Tony Reugger
- Angelo Rizacos as Tony Sklar
- Lamar Jackson as Delmar Fraser
- Paul Hubbard as Burt Knight
- Peter MacNeill as Brannigan
- Laurie Paton as Mabel
- Don Granbery as Vincent Quinn
- Barry Flatman as Brody

== Production ==
=== Development ===
The film was originally conceived as a sequel to Jagged Edge and was meant to have Glenn Close and Robert Loggia reprise their roles. The story was about a private investigator framed for murder and the female lawyer who defends him. The project was developed at Columbia Pictures but then head of production Guy McElwaine was replaced by David Puttnam, who, according to producer Martin Ransohoff, said that he did not want to make sequels (Puttnam denied this, saying his problem was the script "wasn't good and for no other reason... when there's a terrific script for Jagged Edge II Columbia will be anxious to make it".). Ransohoff decided to turn the script into an original story. "It's a good mystery on its own terms", he said. "I think the story is really more effective as an original. Because there wasn't an agreement with Loggia and Close, we had always designed the project to go either as a sequel or on its own terms."

The film was distributed by Columbia Pictures between in the United States and Canada, with Rank Film Distributors handling foreign distribution. The film was produced by Martin Ransohoff who formed with Columbia, Rank Film Distributors and Vestron Video in 1986.

=== Casting ===
The male lead went to Burt Reynolds, after starring in Switching Channels. "Joe is a ballsy character", said Reynolds, "kind of like Dirty Harry gone amok. He's around the edge of having a nervous breakdown but he has a strange sense of humor about it all."

Russell later recalled her part "was a little more difficult than I thought it would be, being someone who was that in control. Michael Crichton, who is a doctor -- and his ex-wife is a lawyer -- was very helpful in that regard. I always felt I wasn't doing anything. It was happening inside, but I didn't feel it would show. But they'd say, `No, if anything, do less.' You can't show your emotions when you're in that lawyer mode. With me (Crichton) was very specific. I had to rely on him a little more than I normally do (on a director) because I was so unsure of that thing of it being so controlled. He had a lot of pre-conceived ideas of how this was supposed to be -- and he was probably right. A couple of times I tried to try to be jokier, funnier, 'cause I felt so boring all the time. Everybody else got to do all this fun stuff and then I tried it and he said, `No, don't do that.' So I said, `Print it. I'd just like to see it.' And then we'd watch it and I'd turn around and say, `You're right, you're right. God, burn it! It just stinks!' So, I just kind of had to prove that to myself."

=== Filming ===
Principal photography was originally planned to take place in Seattle, Washington, but the film was instead shot in Boston and Chelsea, Massachusetts, as well as Toronto and Montreal, Canada. Production began in September 1987. It was filmed under the working title Smoke.

== Reception ==
=== Box office ===
Physical Evidence earned $1,777,358 during its opening weekend at the U.S. box office. The film went on to earn a total of $3,560,932 domestically.

=== Critical response ===
Physical Evidence received negative reviews from critics. The film was described by David Kehr of the Chicago Tribune as a "feeble thriller... the worst case of filmmaking-by-numbers, reflecting not an ounce of commitment or conviction". The Los Angeles Times called it "flat and remote... a thriller that doesn't thrill." Roger Ebert of the Chicago Sun-Times gave the film a mixed review, finding its screenplay and plot elements predictable and noting that Russell and Reynolds lacked chemistry. Janet Maslin of The New York Times gave the film an unfavorable review, writing: "As directed by Michael Crichton, the film wanders dispiritedly from one suspect to another, suggesting that Mr. Reynolds's Joe has been framed but never generating much interest in who the real culprit may be. The film is full of bad alibis, likely suspects, incriminating tape recordings and predictably exotic settings, like an orchid-filled greenhouse in somebody's suburban home."

TV Guide awarded the film a favorable three out of five star-rating, noting that "Russell responds with a powerful performance that telegraphs none of the changes her character undergoes. Likewise, Reynolds' work is top-flight, making it all the more a shame that this vastly underrated film was a flop as a theatrical release."

On the review aggregator website Rotten Tomatoes, 22% of 18 critics' reviews are positive.

Audiences polled by CinemaScore gave the film an average grade of "C" on an A+ to F scale.
