= American Rhapsody (disambiguation) =

American Rhapsody is a musical composition written for the accordion by John Serry Sr.

American Rhapsody may also refer to:

- American Rhapsody (book), a 2000 book by Joe Eszterhas
- An American Rhapsody, a 2001 Hungarian-American film by Éva Gárdos
- America, an Epic Rhapsody, a musical composition by Ernest Bloch
