= Martin Ransohoff =

American film and television producer (1927–2017)

- Born: Martin Nelson Ransohoff; July 7, 1927; New Orleans, Louisiana, U.S.
- Died: December 13, 2017 (aged 90); Los Angeles, California, U.S.
- Education: B.A. Colgate University
- Occupation: Film producer
- Spouses: Nancy Hope Lundgren; Joan Marie Ransohoff
- Children: 4
- Family: Ransohoff

Martin Nelson Ransohoff (July 7, 1927 – December 13, 2017) was an American film and television producer, and member of the Ransohoff family.

== Early life and education ==
Ransohoff was born on July 7, 1927, in New Orleans, Louisiana the son of Babette (Strauss) and Arthur Ransohoff. His mother was a former Republican National Committeewoman. He had one sister Barbara Burnett (married to a former Washington & Jefferson College president Howard J. Burnett) and one brother Jack, a nuclear engineer. He attended Wooster School in Danbury, Connecticut and graduated with a B.A. in History and English from Colgate University in 1948.

== Career ==
After school, Ransohoff worked at several jobs including peddling housewares door-to-door, selling autos, and working at an advertising agency, before joining Caravel Films (later Transfilm-Caravel) in 1950 in New York City, where he worked as a salesman, writer, and producer.

=== Filmways ===
In 1952, Ransohoff co-founded the film production company Filmways with Edwin Kasper (Kasper left the firm in 1957). The firm listed on the New York Stock Exchange in 1959. Filmways started making TV commercials, moved into documentaries, then sitcoms; by 1963 Filmways was making $13 million a year. Mister Ed and The Beverly Hillbillies brought Ransohoff his first major successes in 1960 and 1962. Thereafter he turned his attention to films.

=== MGM ===
Ransohoff's first film as producer was Boys' Night Out (1962) starring James Garner and Kim Novak and distributed by MGM. Garner was also in Ransohoff's next two films, both of which were directed by Arthur Hiller: The Wheeler Dealers (1963) and The Americanization of Emily (1964); the latter, based on a script by Paddy Chayefsky, was particularly praised.

Ransohoff found commercial success with The Sandpiper (1965), based on a story by the producer and starring Richard Burton and Elizabeth Taylor. He produced The Cincinnati Kid (1965), firing Sam Peckinpah as director during filming and replacing him with Norman Jewison; the movie received strong reviews. Less popular was The Loved One (1965). Eye of the Devil (1967) was a thriller originally starring Kim Novak, David Niven, and a young actor Ransohoff put under personal contract, Sharon Tate. Novak was injured during filming and was replaced by Deborah Kerr. Tate was in Ransohoff's next films, The Fearless Vampire Killers (1967), directed by Roman Polanski, whom she would marry (Ransohoff was executive producer), and Don't Make Waves (1967). He executive produced Our Mother's House (1967) in England and produced Ice Station Zebra (1968).

=== Post-MGM ===
Ransohoff then signed a deal with Columbia, who distributed his A Midsummer Night's Dream (1968), Castle Keep (1969), and Hamlet (1969). He made Catch-22 (1970) at Paramount, The Moonshine War (1970) at MGM, and 10 Rillington Place (1971) and See No Evil (1971) at Columbia. King Lear (1971) was released by a smaller company. He also made Fuzz (1972) and Save the Tiger (1973). His last film for Filmways was The White Dawn (1974).

=== Post-Filmways ===
In 1972, Ransohoff became an independent producer. He signed a contract with Paramount to make movies for them. Ransohoff went on to produce Silver Streak (1976) with Frank Yablans but even though the film was a hit the partnership was uneasy and soon dissolved.

Ranshoff then made Nightwing (1979), and The Wanderers (1979). He made a short lived TV series Co-Ed Fever (1979) but focused on features: A Change of Seasons (1980), American Pop (1981), Hanky Panky (1982), and Class (1983).

=== Columbia and later films ===
Ransohoff had success with Jagged Edge (1985) based on a script for Joe Eszterhas. It was made by Columbia who also distributed Ransohoff's The Big Town (1987), Switching Channels (1988), Physical Evidence (1989), and Welcome Home (1989). It was around that time that his company Albacore Productions had inked pacts with Columbia Pictures, which covered domestic theatrical distribution, British film distributor Rank Film Distributors, which covered international distribution and Vestron Video, which covered home video distribution for a three-film agreement. Ransohoff's later films included Guilty as Sin (1993) and Turbulence (1997).

== Personal life ==
Ransohoff was married twice. His first wife was Nancy Hope Lundgren; they had four children Peter (born 1952), Karen (born 1954), and twins Steven and Kurt (born 1957). His second wife was Joan Marie Ransohoff, an artist. Ransohoff died on December 13, 2017, at his Bel Air home in Los Angeles. He was 90.

== Selected filmography ==
- Boys' Night Out (1962) – producer
- The Beverly Hillbillies (1962–71) (TV series) – executive producer
- The Wheeler Dealers (1963) – producer
- The Americanization of Emily (1964) – producer
- Topkapi (1964) – producer
- The Sandpiper (1965) – story, producer
- The Cincinnati Kid (1965) – producer
- The Loved One (1965) – executive producer (uncredited)
- Eye of the Devil (1967) – producer
- The Fearless Vampire Killers (1967) – executive producer
- Don't Make Waves (1967) – producer
- Our Mother's House (1967) – executive producer
- Ice Station Zebra (1968) – producer
- A Midsummer Night's Dream (1968) – executive producer
- Castle Keep (1969) – producer
- Hamlet (1969) – producer
- Catch-22 (1970) – producer
- The Moonshine War (1970) – producer
- 10 Rillington Place (1971) – producer
- See No Evil (1971) – producer
- King Lear (1971) – producer
- What's the Matter with Helen? (1971) – presenter
- Fuzz (1972) – producer
- Save the Tiger (1973) – producer
- The White Dawn (1974) – story, producer
- Silver Streak (1976) – executive producer
- Nightwing (1979) – producer
- The Wanderers (1979) – producer
- Co-Ed Fever (1979) (TV series) – executive producer
- A Change of Seasons (1980) – story, producer
- American Pop (1981) – producer
- Hanky Panky (1982) – producer
- Class (1983) – producer
- Jagged Edge (1985) – producer
- The Big Town (1987) – producer
- Switching Channels (1988) – producer
- Physical Evidence (1989) – producer
- Welcome Home (1989) – producer
- Guilty as Sin (1993) – producer
- Turbulence (1997) – producer

== See also ==
- Ransohoff family
