= Elizabeth Haydon =

American writer (born 1965)

- Born: 1965 (age 59–60)
- Occupation: Author
- Genre: Fantasy

Website
- Official website (2004 archive)

Elizabeth Haydon (born 1965) is an American fantasy author. Her Symphony of Ages series contains two trilogies, a duology, and a final book, and begins with Rhapsody: Child of Blood (1999). Her other series, The Lost Journals of Ven Polypheme, is set in the same universe but serves as a historical prequel. Her most recent publication is The Weaver's Lament (2016).

== Biography ==
Haydon is the daughter of an Air Force officer and moved around frequently as a child. She attended Binghamton University. Prior to becoming a full-time writer, Haydon worked in publishing for more than thirty years. Past roles include developmental editing and writing textbooks. Her experience in education support services inspired her to release a free supplemental curriculum for The Floating Island for teachers.

The royalties from both Rhapsody and Prophecy were donated to children's charities such as the Elizabeth Glaser Pediatric AIDS Foundation. Rhapsody was optioned in the late 1990s, and it was renewed in 2000, at which point at least one script draft had been finished. As of 2018, no further developments had been made.

== The Symphony of Ages ==
The Symphony of Ages books series consists of the Rhapsody Trilogy, the two Middle Books, and, as of June 2015, The War of the Known World Trilogy. The third book in this trilogy, and thus the eighth in the Symphony of Ages series, was published in June 2015.

=== The Rhapsody Trilogy ===
The Rhapsody Trilogy follows Rhapsody, a woman who uses true names and music as magic. An altercation with some henchmen puts her in the company of the giant Grunthor and the assassin Achmed the Snake, previously known simply as The Brother. The trio escape from the destruction of their society by using an ancient tree to move through space and time, and emerge 1,400 years later.

1. Rhapsody: Child of Blood. Tor Books. 1999. ISBN 978-081-257-081-6.
2. Prophecy: Child of Earth. Tor Books. 2001. ISBN 978-0-312-86751-5.
3. Destiny: Child of the Sky. Tor Books. 2002. ISBN 978-081-257-083-0.

=== The Bridge/Middle Duology ===
Three years after Destiny, a war breaks out over a southern empire whose monarch has recently died. Meanwhile, an old enemy of Rhapsody's returns.

1. Requiem for the Sun. Tor Books. 2003. ISBN 978-125-025-586-0.
2. Elegy for a Lost Star. Tor Books. 2004. ISBN 978-081-254-192-2.

=== The War of the Known World Trilogy ===
As a mysterious man arrives by sea, a convocation of dragons takes place elsewhere and a new council of war meets in Haguefort.

1. The Assassin King. Tor Books. 2006. ISBN 978-076-530-565-7.
2. The Merchant Emperor. Tor Books. 2014. ISBN 978-076-530-566-4.
3. The Hollow Queen. Tor Books. 2015. ISBN 978-076-530-567-1.

=== Final chapter ===
Rhapsody is forced to choose between family and friends as a civil war approaches.

1. The Weaver's Lament. Tor Books. 2016. ISBN 978-076-532-055-1.

== The Lost Journals of Ven Polypheme ==
Charles Magnus Ven Polypheme comes from a large family of unadventurous shipbuilders. When he is offered the opportunity to oversee a test-run of a new ship, Ven is excited to have a chance to explore, but is soon attacked by pirates. Another ship rescues him and he joins their crew. He is chosen to accompany the captain to a near-utopia on a floating island and quickly finds himself entrenched in mystery, exploration, and murder. This trilogy takes place in the same universe as Symphony of Ages but follows Ven Polypheme, a historical figure in Rhapsody's time.

1. The Floating Island. Starscape. 2006. ISBN 978-076-530-867-2.
2. The Thief Queen's Daughter. Starscape. 2007. ISBN 978-076-530-868-9.
3. The Dragon's Lair. Starscape. 2009. ISBN 978-076-530-869-6.
4. The Tree of Water. Starscape. 2014. ISBN 978-076-532-059-9.
5. The Star of the Sea (unreleased)

== Other publications ==
- Silverberg, Robert, ed. (2003). "Threshold". Legends II. Del Rey Books. ISBN 978-034-545-644-1.
- Greeley, Andrew (ed.). "The Merrow". Emerald Magic: Great Tales of Irish Fantasy. Tor Books. ISBN 978-076-530-504-6.
