= Buddy Joe Hooker =

American stunt performer (born 1942)

- Born: May 30, 1942 (age 83); Vallejo, California
- Occupations: Actor; second unit director; stunt man; stunt coordinator
- Children: 2
- Website: buddyjoehooker.com

Buddy Joe Hooker (born May 30, 1942) is an American actor, second unit director, stunt man, and stunt coordinator. He is known for his expertise in designing and performing vehicle stunts for movies and television.

== Career ==
Hooker began as a young child actor on the television series The Adventures of Rin Tin Tin. Under the stage name, Buddy Hart, his acting career continued in shows such as Gunsmoke, Father Knows Best and Twilight Zone. He also starred in the family feature that his stunt performer father, Hugh Hooker, produced called The Littlest Hobo. That role led to a part on Leave It to Beaver as one of Wally Cleaver’s best friends, Chester, from 1957 to 1960. He was also one of the bachelors on The Dating Game in 1969, as "Joey Hooker", where he was chosen by the bachelorette Farrah Fawcett.

Hooker pursued the stunt profession in Rock Hudson’s Tobruk and Shirley MacLaine’s Sweet Charity. Throughout the years, his reputation as an all around stuntman led to his regular employment as Disney’s premiere stunt coordinator for 8 years.

Hooker’s reputation as the go-to coordinator for car chases grew with movies such as To Live and Die in L.A., Jade, and Death Proof. He was coordinator for Harold And Maude, The Outsiders, Godfather III, Close Encounters of the Third Kind, Meet Joe Black, and 40 Year Old Virgin.

In the 1977 film about the stunt business, Hooper, Hooker broke industry records with a rocket powered car jump and many other stunts doubling Jan Michael Vincent’s character Ski.

His career continued with the first motorcycle jump over a helicopter as it landed, and rolling a truck 17 times down a sand embankment in the 1971 action feature Clay Pigeon.

The Academy of Motion Pictures Arts and Sciences inducted Hooker into its membership during the first year it began a limited initiation of motion picture stunt coordinators. He is an original member of the stunt talent organization Stunts Unlimited and has served five terms as its president.

Hooker was presented with the "Lifetime Achievement Award" at the 2014 World Stunt Awards.

== Personal life ==
Hooker and his wife Gayle, who is also a stunt performer, have twin sons who worked as stunt performers in the film Spy Kids.

== Cultural references ==
The 1978 feature film Hooper, starring Burt Reynolds, is based on a fictionalized account of his life. In the film, Hooker actually performed stunts for both Reynolds and Jan-Michael Vincent. He was also on The Dating Game in 1969 with Farrah Fawcett, which broke out into a staged fight. Hooker was the bachelor selected by Fawcett.
