= Bishop's Block =

- U.S. National Register of Historic Places
- U.S. Historic district – Contributing property
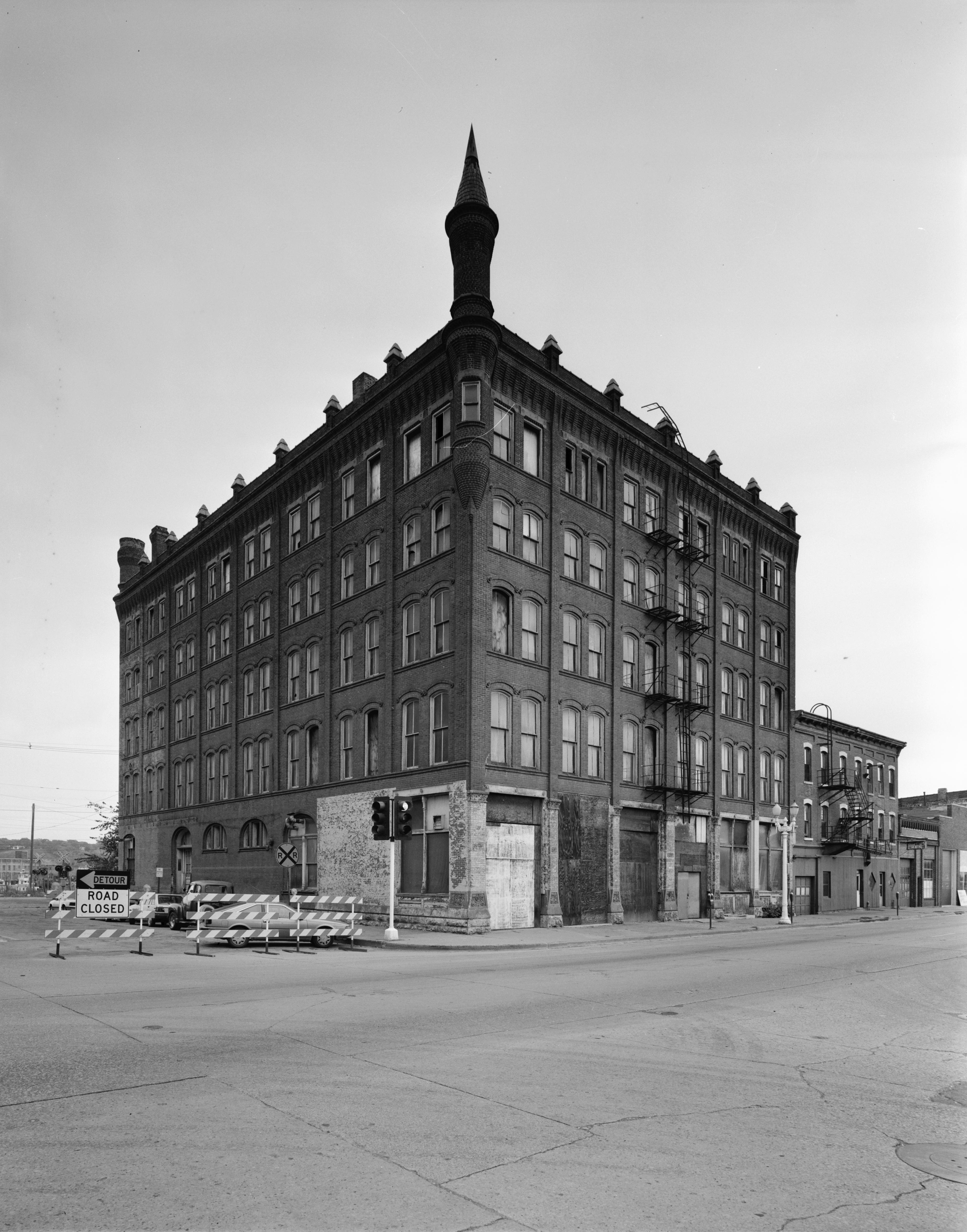

- Location within Iowa Location within the United States
- Location: 90 W. Main St. Dubuque, Iowa, United States
- Coordinates: 42°29′40″N 90°39′49″W
- Area: less than one acre
- Built: 1887
- Architect: Franklin D. Hyde
- Architectural style: Romanesque Revival
- Part of: Old Main Street Historic District (ID83000356)
- NRHP reference No.: 94000477
- Added to NRHP: May 19, 1994

The Bishop's Block, also known as the Bishop's Block Apartments, is a historic building located in Dubuque, Iowa, United States. It was individually listed on the National Register of Historic Places in 1994. It was included as a contributing property in the Old Main Street Historic District in 2015.

== History ==
The building significance is derived from its association with its architect, Franklin D. Hyde. He was a Dubuque architect known for his residential designs. Considered his best work, Hyde designed the building in the Romanesque Revival style. It was completed in 1887 and the exterior is composed of brick. The building measures 75.5 feet (23 m) tall and rises five floors. At one time the building had a distinctive turret on its northwest corner, which was destroyed by lightning in July 2011.

The building was commissioned by John Hennessy, the third bishop of the Catholic Diocese of Dubuque, and derives its name from him. He was involved in speculative real estate and business ventures in the Dubuque area, and he built or acquired numerous buildings around the city. This building was first occupied by wholesale grocer Marshall M. Walker. After five years, the John T. Hancock Company was housed here. The Western Grocery Company occupied the building from 1908 into the 1950s. It has subsequently been renovated into apartments.
