= Ransohoff =

Ransohoff family Ransohov
- Place of origin: Westphalia
- Founded: ca. 1800
- Founder: Levy Abraham Ransohoff
- Members: Martin Ransohoff, Joseph Ransohoff, Daniel J. Ransohoff
- Traditions: Judaism

The Ransohoff family is a German Jewish family originally from Westphalia, Germany. The progenitor of the family, Levy Abraham Ransohoff (1761-1845) was a wealthy Westphalian merchant, who had four sons. Each of his sons occupied key positions in the Frankfurt Parliament, became notable doctors and academics, and his eldest son, Sigmund even received a knighthood. In the beginning of the 20th-century, the majority of the family immigrated to Cincinnati, United States, where they rose to prominence in medicine and the arts.

== See also ==
- 25469 Ransohoff, a minor planet named for the family.
- Ben Casey, an American medical drama series partially inspired by the life of Joseph Ransohoff
- Priscilla Ransohoff, Army educational specialist at Fort Monmouth (and wife of Nicholas Ransohoff, an orthopedic surgeon)
- Ransohoff's, defunct San Francisco department store
