= Old Main Street Historic District (Dubuque, Iowa) =

Historic district in Iowa, United States

- U.S. National Register of Historic Places
- U.S. Historic district
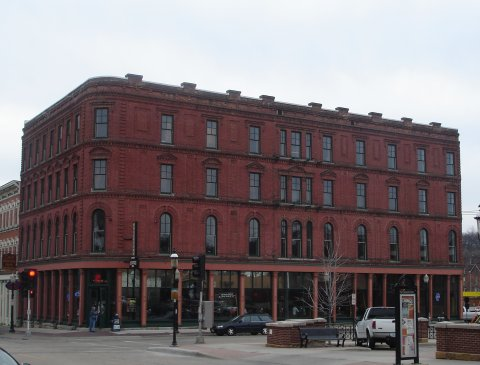

- Location within Iowa Location within the United States
- Location: Main St. between 1st and 4th Sts., Dubuque, Iowa
- Coordinates: 42°29′47″N 90°39′53″W
- Area: 5.64 acres (2.28 ha)
- NRHP reference No.: 83000356 (original); 15000722 (increase 1); 100013548 (increase 2)

Significant dates
- Added to NRHP: January 12, 1983
- Boundary increases: October 13, 2015; October 25, 2026

Old Main Street Historic District is a nationally recognized historic district located in Dubuque, Iowa, United States. It was listed on the National Register of Historic Places in 1983. At the time of its nomination it consisted of 33 resources, which included 30 contributing buildings and three non-contributing buildings. In 2015 the boundaries were increased to include five more buildings, and another was added in 2026. Four of the buildings are contributing properties that were excluded from the original district because they were slated to be torn down as a part of the expansion of U.S. Route 61. While the highway was built the buildings were spared. The fifth building is non-contributing as are three structures.

This is primarily a commercial area located immediately south of the central business district. Originally, this is where the city's commercial district was located because of its proximity to the ferry and riverboat landings. After 1860 most of the larger retail businesses, banks, and professional offices moved further north on Main Street, and new wholesale businesses moved here and built new structures. The buildings are all constructed in brick and are between three and four stories tall. It is considered to be the "largest concentration of significant nineteenth-century commercial architecture" in Dubuque. The Bishop's Block (1887) and the German Bank (1901) are individually listed on the National Register, and the Hotel Julien Dubuque (1914) is also a contributing building.

== See also ==
- National Register of Historic Places listings in Dubuque County, Iowa
