= Willson Osborne =

American classical composer

Willson Osborne (1906–1979) was an American composer.

After completing the undergraduate program in composition and music theory at the University of Michigan (studying with Ross Lee Finney), Osborne was a student of Paul Hindemith at Yale University. Osborne was, like his mentor, a neoclassical composer. He taught music theory and composition at Philadelphia's New School of Music (now part of the Boyer College of Music at Temple University). Osborne's work remains little-known except for his Rhapsody, which is the most frequently-performed work in the literature for unaccompanied bassoon, and in an adapted version is also popular as a recital piece for the clarinet. The Rhapsody, originally written in 1952 as "Study for Bassoon", came into the public notice after being recorded by noted Philadelphia Orchestra bassoonist Sol Schoenbach and broadcast on WNYC during a special contemporary American music feature. Despite the success of this piece, little has been written about Osborne or his work.

In addition to the Rhapsody, Osborne wrote several solo piano pieces (including a set entitled Six Pieces for the Young Pianist), chamber pieces for brass ensembles, and works for a cappella mixed choir, and also arranged and harmonized several other works. His last published original composition was a 1965 piano solo, "The Quiet Sons"; though he continued to write, the later works remain unpublished.

== References and further reading ==
- Ewell, Terry. Willson Osborne's Rhapsody for Bassoon. The Double Reed, vol. 13, no. 2, fall 1990 (see also corrections in The Double Reed, vol. 13 no. 3, winter 1990).
- Schoenbach, Sol. The story behind the composing of the Osborne Rhapsody. Journal of the International Double Reed Society, number 11, 1983.
- Gbur, Bruce (March 22, 2000). "David Debolt: Bassoon Music of 20th-Century America". American Music. 18 (1). Archived from the original on January 17, 2005 – via FindArticles.
- Hanna, Steven R. Analysis and Performance of Music for Unaccompanied Bassoon by … Willson Osborne …, DMA Dissertation, UMI, 1993.
- Osborne's "Study for Bassoon", which was later revised and published as "Rhapsody for Bassoon"
