= Csákánydoroszló =

Village in Vas, Hungary

- Flag Coat of arms

- Location of Vas county in Hungary

- Location of Csákánydoroszló
- Coordinates: 46.97282°N 16.50466°E
- Country: Hungary
- County: Vas

Area
  - Total: 26.61 km^{2} (10.27 sq mi)

Population (2015)
  - Total: 1,757
  - Density: 65.73/km^{2} (170.2/sq mi)
- Time zone: UTC+1 (CET)
  - Summer (DST): UTC+2 (CEST)
- Postal code: 9919
- Area code: 94

Csákánydoroszló is a village in Vas County, Hungary.

== Notable people ==
Joe Eszterhas was born in Csákánydoroszló in 1944.
