= Daniel J. Ransohoff =

American academic

Daniel J. Ransohoff (December 29, 1921 – May 29, 1993) was an American associate professor of Community Planning at the University of Cincinnati, and a promoter of the city as a planner, tour guide, historian, professor, photographer and fund-raiser. In the early 1950s, he was on the staff of Family Service, for which he took photographs of the clients the agency was serving.

== Education ==
Daniel J. Ransohoff was born to the German Jewish Ransohoff family in Cincinnati, Ohio. He began his career as a documentary photographer. After serving in the Navy, he obtained a bachelor's degree at Bard College, a master's degree in social work at Columbia University and a doctorate at Union Graduate School and returned to Cincinnati to pursue a dual career as a social worker for Family Service of the Cincinnati area, the Community Chest, and the United Way (United Appeal) and as an associate professor of community planning at the University of Cincinnati.

== Photographer ==
Ransohoff created a photographic record, now housed in the Cincinnati Museum, that spanned 30 years and documents Cincinnati's disadvantaged in neighborhoods across the city, including the West End. He left a collection of more than 25,000 prints and negatives of urban housing, economic, social, and health conditions, children, the elderly, families, and the agencies which try to alleviate the conditions.

One example of such imagery was included in 1955 by Edward Steichen in the world-touring Museum of Modern Art exhibition The Family of Man, seen by 9 million viewers and perpetuated in a catalogue that has never been out of print. Ransohoff's contribution demonstrates his respect for the dignity of his subjects; it is classically and sympathetically composed to show both the interior of an old tenement and its occupant, a resolute old woman in a worn floral dress, top lit and standing next to her rocking chair which is silhouetted against the cheaply curtained window. Author Bill Miller wrote of him in Cincinnati Magazine in May 1968 that, “…his photos have become classics that live on and on, stirring human conscience wherever they are seen.” Many of his photographs appeared in Time, Life, The New Yorker, and on national television

== Promoter of social work ==
Aside from documenting substandard living conditions of the clients of Family Service, for which he was appointed Community Relations Director, he also photographed to show what social work was and the vital roles that social workers performed in the community. With World War II over, there was a new generation of families who needed the assistance of a clinically trained social worker for marital problems, alcoholism, parent-child relationships, and emotional problems, during a time of tremendous change for American families when men were returning from the military services to the workforce, and women who had worked during the war were back at home; together they were producing babies in record numbers. Ransohoff's specialty was public relations through photography to help families become aware of the ways Family Service could help. In the early 1960s, the New York-based Family Service Association of America published a pamphlet Their Career: Helping People Help Themselves which used Ransohoff's imagery to recruit young adults into social work.

== Later career ==
Ransohoff went on to work for Community Chest, where he continued to capture images of life in the Cincinnati community. His two official jobs were teaching community planning at the University of Cincinnati and directing special projects for the United Way and Community Chest, but in his unofficial role, he conducted hundreds of tours of the city for residents and visitors and for companies who used him to help recruit workers who may have had negative feelings about the city. He co-founded Cincinnati's classical music public radio station WGUC and was chairman of the Friends of Judaic Studies.

Ransohoff died of pancreatic cancer in a hospital in Cincinnati, on May 29, 1993, and was survived by two daughters, Sallie Ransohoff Kreines and Lela Ransohoff, both of Cincinnati; two brothers, Jerry and William, both of Cincinnati; a stepson, Charles Fleischmann, of Unionville, Pa.; a stepdaughter, Melanie Fleischmann of North Salem, N.Y., and two grandchildren.

== Exhibitions ==
- Skirball Museum in Cincinnati George S. Rosenthal, Daniel J. Ransohoff and Ben Rosen: Documenting Cincinnati’s Neighborhoods October 22—December 21, 2014
- Lois & Richard Rosenthal Center for Contemporary Art • 44 E. 6th Street, Cincinnati, Photographs by Daniel J. Ransohoff, December 1–December 31, 1961

== Books ==
- Ransohoff, Daniel J (1959), Pictures tell your story, National Publicity Council for Health and Welfare Services
- Ransohoff, Daniel J (1961), How Cincinnati helps : the story of how Greater Cincinnati's health and welfare agencies serve your community, Published for the Cincinnati schools by the Voters' Service Education Fund of the League of Women Voters
- Ransohoff, Daniel J; Plattner, S. W.; Cincinnati Historical Society. (1988), There is in every human countenance, either a history or a prophecy, Cincinnati, OH: Hennegan Co.

== Collections ==
Cincinnati History Library and Archives, Cincinnati Museum Center: The collection covers the years 1934 to 1981. The negatives have been reproduced on microfiche, and the prints are arranged by subject. A finding aid for the collection is available in the library.
