= Prophecy: Child of Earth =

2000 fantasy novel by Elizabeth Haydon

- Author: Elizabeth Haydon
- Genre: Fantasy
- Publisher: Tor Books
- Publication date: 2000
- ISBN: 978-0-312-86751-5

Prophecy: Child of Earth is a fantasy novel by American writer Elizabeth Haydon, first published in 2000 by Tor Books. It is the second book in The Symphony of Ages series. In it, Rhapsody, Grunthor and Achmed work to find a place in the new world.

== Plot summary ==
Rhapsody travels with Ashe to deliver a dragon's claw, long ago hidden among the treasures of Ylorc, for fear of the dragon's wreaking vengeance upon those who would keep her claw from her. On the journey, Ashe and Rhapsody develop a degree of comfort with one another, punctuated by arguments. Upon their arrival, Rhapsody finds the dragon surprisingly friendly, and she stays for several days before departing. Meanwhile, in the halls of Ylorc, Grunthor and Achmed discover a hidden tunnel, leading to the Loritorium: the unfinished masterpiece of Ylorc's builder, centuries past. To their surprise, Gruthor and Achmed are confronted by a Dhracian as they investigate: one of the last of a near-legendary race, to which Achmed owes half his heritage. The Dhracian, who calls herself the Grandmother, instructs Achmed and Grunthor to return with Rhapsody.

Rhapsody, after leaving the dragon's cave, travels to Tyrian, the forest home to the Lirin, so that she can meet and train with the former bearer of her elemental blade, Daystar Clarion. While in training, she sees a horrific vision of the world engulfed in blood after the death of the Patriarch, leader of one of the two major human religions. Rhapsody journeys to Sepulvarta, home of the Patriarch, and successfully defends the Patriarch against an attack by a F'Dor demon and his minion, the Rakshas. She then travels back to Ylorc, where Grunthor and Achmed lead her to the Grandmother. The Grandmother tells them of the Dhracian colony that had lived in the mountains of Ylorc for centuries, destroyed by the same saboteur who murdered the inhabitants of the Loritorium. She also shows them the treasure the Dhracian colony was founded to protect: the sleeping Child of Earth, whose second rib can be used as a key to open the Vault of the Underworld imprisoning most of the F'Dor. The Child of Earth's sleep is restless, rocked with prophetic nightmares, but Rhapsody is unable to help.

After finally figuring out Ashe's secret, Rhapsody summons Ashe to her underground home in Ylorc with a carefully crafted song. Once he arrives, Rhapsody explains her realizations: Ashe is Gwydion, long believed dead after he failed in an attack on the F'Dor and had part of his soul torn out in the process. Gwydion was secretly resurrected by the power of the star which once adorned Daystar Clarion's hilt, however, awakening his dragon side in the process, and had wandered the land in secrecy for the decades following the attack. The lost piece of his soul was used to create the Rakshas, which wreaked havoc with Ashe's appearance. Ashe and Rhapsody become lovers, causing Jo (Rhapsody's adopted sister) no end of jealousy. The Rakshas uses this to trick Jo - pretending to be Ashe, he has sex with her, bringing her partially under the control of the F'Dor in the process. In an attempt to reclaim the stolen piece of Ashe's soul, Rhapsody sets out with Grunthor and Achmed to destroy the Rakshas. The demonically-influenced Jo nearly kills Achmed at the end of the battle, forcing Rhapsody to kill her to save Achmed, and subsequently battle to save her soul from the clutching vine of the F'Dor.

Some days later, Ashe and Rhapsody meet again for a night of revelations. Ashe locks the memory of the night in a pearl, expecting the only thing said to be of his father, Llauron, concocted to use Rhapsody in a bid for power. In the course of the discussion, Ashe and Rhapsody learn to their surprise that they are (respectively) Sam and Emily, who loved one another one and a half millennia ago (It's complicated.) They get married, but Rhapsody agrees that she will have to forget it all so that Llauron's selfish plot can succeed. Then a tree root that the Rakshas corrupted attacks the Child of Earth, attempting to seize it (and thereby gain the key to the Underworld), but Grunthor, forewarned by a dream, manages to get Rhapsody and Achmed into position soon enough to avert the threat. Then they realize that the Rakshas conceived children with demon-tainted blood, who Rhapsody resolves to rescue.

== Characters ==
- Rhapsody, Singer
- Achmed the Snake, King of Ylorc
- Grunthor, Achmed's Sergeant-Major
- Ashe/Gwydion of Manosse
- Jo, Rhapsody's adopted sister
- Llauron the Invoker, father of Ashe
- Anborn, former General
- Stephen, Duke of Navarne

== Reviews ==
- Review by Carolyn Cushman (2000) in Locus, #475 August 2000
- Review by Jennifer A. Hall (2001) in Locus, #481 February 2001
- Review by uncredited (2002) in Vector 221

== See also ==
- Rhapsody: Child of Blood
