= Guilty as Sin =

1993 drama thriller film by Sidney Lumet

- theatrical release poster
- Directed by: Sidney Lumet
- Written by: Larry Cohen
- Produced by: Martin Ransohoff
- Starring: Rebecca De Mornay; Don Johnson; Stephen Lang; Jack Warden
- Cinematography: Andrzej Bartkowiak
- Edited by: Evan A. Lottman
- Music by: Howard Shore
- Production company: Hollywood Pictures
- Distributed by: Buena Vista Pictures Distribution
- Release date: June 4, 1993
- Running time: 107 minutes
- Country: United States
- Language: English
- Budget: $12 million
- Box office: $41 million

Guilty as Sin is a 1993 American legal thriller film written by Larry Cohen, directed by Sidney Lumet and produced by Martin Ransohoff. It stars Rebecca De Mornay and Don Johnson, and was produced by Hollywood Pictures.

== Plot ==
Jennifer Haines is an up-and-coming Chicago attorney. She wins a big case, celebrates with the man in her life, Phil Garson, and returns to work to a hero's reception.

Into her life walks David Greenhill, who was seated in the gallery during her previous trial. Greenhill is a debonair and arrogant ladies' man who stands accused of murdering his wealthy wife, Rita. He wants Haines to represent him, but she declines.

Something about him intrigues her, though, so the equally arrogant Haines has second thoughts. She tells her law firm's superiors that this promises to be a high-profile trial and she wants it because: "I am that good."

Greenhill maintains his innocence but shows signs of irrational behavior that make Haines wary of him. She assigns her longtime investigator Moe to do some digging and he begins to unearth the defendant's shady past. Greenhill in the meantime starts showing up unexpectedly in Haines's social life, stalking her and dropping hints that something is going on between them.

Phil dislikes the guy intensely and demands Haines drop him as a client. She does not care for Greenhill either but resents being told what to do. She refuses to quit his case until her law partners notify her that the fee Greenhill promised remains unpaid. An unsympathetic judge tells Haines that it is her own fault and refuses to let her abandon her client.

Learning from Moe that Greenhill has a history of dating older women who usually end up dead, a horrified Haines wants to turn him in, but is bound to attorney-client privilege. She instead tries to sabotage her own case by having evidence planted at Greenhill's apartment, hoping that it will lead to his conviction. He knows she must be behind it and takes his revenge by viciously assaulting Phil, who ends up hospitalized.

Greenhill's case ends in a mistrial, after the jury fails to reach a unanimous verdict. Greenhill, seemingly pleased, displays regret that he never had a chance to take the stand. He does so privately for Haines in the empty courtroom, revealing that he had been scouting her far in advance of the murder case. He confesses that he did indeed kill his wife and provides vivid details.

Greenhill further tells Haines that he knows she planted the evidence. He could use this to blackmail her, but says that he has come to tire of her. Haines fears the psychopathic Greenhill will now come after her. She prepares to disclose everything, even at the cost of her career.

Greenhill anticipates this. He murders Moe, knocking him out and then setting fire to his office. He then intercepts Haines at her apartment building. He casually states that between Phil's beating and Moe's death, she is grieving enough to commit suicide. A fierce struggle ensues. Greenhill manages to throw Haines over a railing, but to his horror, she pulls him down with her. They fall several stories together. Greenhill is killed in the fall. Haines, cushioned by his body, is severely injured but survives. As she is carried off to the hospital, she triumphantly states: "I beat him, Phil. I beat him. Tough way to win a case."

== Cast ==
- Rebecca De Mornay as Jennifer Haines
- Don Johnson as David Greenhill
- Stephen Lang as Phil Garson
- Dana Ivey as Judge Tompkins
- Jack Warden as Moe
- Luis Guzman as Detective Bernard Martinez
- Ron White as Prosecutor DiAngelo
- Norma Dell'Agnese as Emily, Jennifer's assistant

== Production ==
The film was filmed entirely on location in Toronto.

== Reception ==
The film earned mostly mixed reviews from critics, earning a 38% rating on Rotten Tomatoes. Audiences polled by CinemaScore gave the film an average grade of "B" on an A+ to F scale.

Chicago Sun-Times reviewer Roger Ebert, who gave the film three out of four stars:

As the true extent of Johnson's twisted scheme becomes revealed, as De Mornay becomes trapped between what she sees as justice and the mistakes she's made, the movie becomes truly engrossing on a psychological level.

It grossed nearly $23 million in the U.S. and Canada and grossed $17.8 million internationally for a worldwide total of $40.7 million.
