= Rapsodia =

Rapsodia may refer to:

- Rapsodia, album by pianist Gonzalo Rubalcaba
- Rapsodia, album by Moldovan violinist Patricia Kopatchinskaja
- "Rapsodia" (Mia Martini song), 1992
- "Rapsodia" (Andrea Bocelli song) written by Zucchero
- Rapsodia, a Bucharest-based musical instruments shop owned by the instrument maker Hora (company)

== See also ==
- Rhapsody (disambiguation)
- Rhapsodia, a 2005 video game
