= German Bank (Dubuque, Iowa) =

- U.S. National Register of Historic Places
- U.S. Historic district – Contributing property
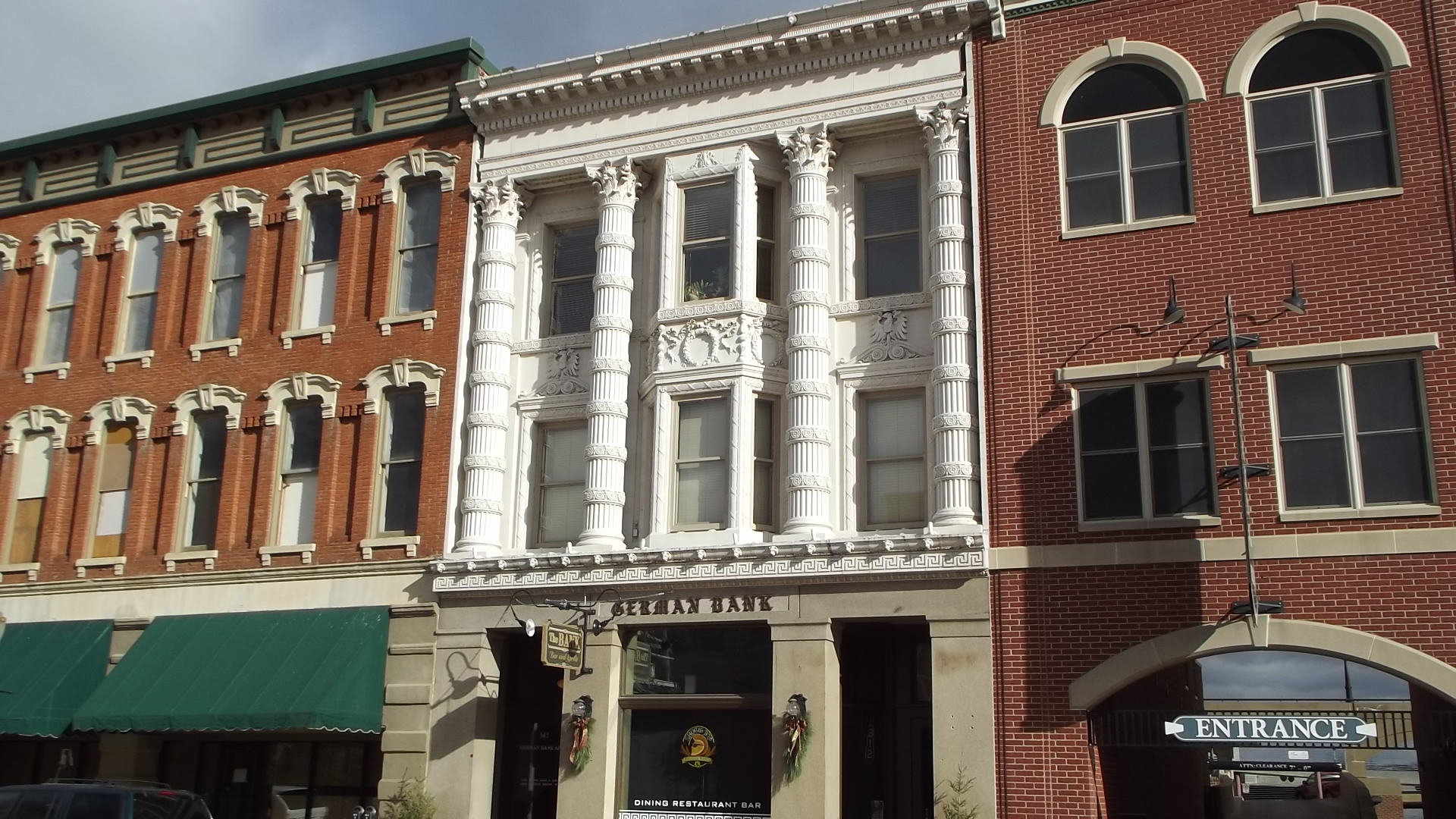

- Location within Iowa Location within the United States
- Interactive map showing the location of German Bank
- Location: 342 Main St. Dubuque, Iowa
- Coordinates: 42°29′49.8″N 90°39′53.7″W
- Area: less than one acre
- Built: 1901
- Architect: W.G. Williamson; John Spencer
- Part of: Old Main Street Historic District (ID83000356)
- NRHP reference No.: 78001216
- Added to NRHP: March 28, 1978

German Bank is a historic building located in the Lower Main Street district of Dubuque, Iowa, United States. The city's German community was its most prominent ethnic group in the mid to late 19th century. Like many other Iowa cities of that era, Dubuque had banks that were owned by, and catered to, members of their particular immigrant communities. T.H. Thedinga, the city's first German-born mayor, started this bank in 1864 to serve immigrant Germans. In 1868 it moved from its original location on Main Street and into the former Dubuque Miners' Bank building. That building was torn down in 1901 in order to construct this one. It was designed by Dubuque architect John Spencer in partnership with Chicago architect W.G. Williamson. The three-story brick building has a highly decorative main facade composed of polished pink granite on the main floor and terra cotta on the upper two floors. Decorative elements include egg-and-dart, Greek fret, a row of small lions' heads, bay windows, scroll pediments, imperial German eagles, and a bracketed cornice with dentils. The second and third floors are dominated by four fluted, banded columns with Corinthian capitals.

The bank remained in operation here until 1932 when it closed in the Great Depression. Since 1946 the first floor has housed a restaurant and bar. The building was individually listed on the National Register of Historic Places in 1978. and it was included as a contributing property in the Old Main Street Historic District in 1983.
