= Victoria Smith =

New Zealand netball player

Personal information
- Born: 8 January 1983 (age 43) Wellington, New Zealand
- Height: 1.84 m (6 ft 0 in)
- University: University of Queensland

Netball career

Victoria Smith (born 8 January 1983) is a New Zealand netball player in the ANZ Championship, who has played in both Australia, New Zealand and international competitions. Representing the Wellington-based franchise, Central Pulse team in the 2011, 2012 and 2013 season. She has previously played for the Canterbury Tactix in 2008, 2009 and 2010. From 2005 – 2007 Victoria Smith represented the Capital Shakers team, in now defunct National Bank Cup and prior to this played for the Queensland Firebirds in the Australian Commonwealth Bank Cup. She also represented the Australian 19 and under team in 2002–2003. Smith specialises in the positions of GK and GD (Goal keep and Goal defence).

After relocating to Hong Kong Victoria represented Hong Kong National team in international competitions.

Victoria Smith received a scholarship from the University of Queensland whilst representing the Queensland Firebirds and Australia under-age teams.
