= Rhapsody in Blue (disambiguation) =

Rhapsody in Blue is a musical composition by American composer George Gershwin.

Rhapsody in Blue may also refer to:

- Rhapsody in Blue (film), a 1945 film about George Gershwin
- Rhapsody in Blue (TV series), a 2006 Singaporean television show
- "Rhapsody in Blue" (Farscape episode), an episode of the television series Farscape
- "Rhapsody in Blue", a 2013 Judge John Hodgman podcast episode
- Rhapsody in Blue (album), a 2013 album by pianist Uri Caine

== See also ==
- A Rhapsody in Black and Blue, a 1932 short film
