= Joe Eszterhas =

Hungarian-American screenwriter and author

- Born: József Antal Eszterhás; November 23, 1944 (age 81); Csákánydoroszló, Hungary
- Education: Ohio University
- Occupations: Screenwriter; author; journalist
- Spouses: Gerri Javor (m. 1970; div. 1994) Naomi Baka (m. 1994)
- Children: 7
- Writing career
- Notable works: Flashdance; Jagged Edge; Basic Instinct; Showgirls

József Antal Eszterhás (Hungarian: [ˈjoːʒɛf ɒntɒl ˈɛstɛrhaːʃ]; born November 23, 1944), credited as Joe Eszterhas, is a Hungarian-American writer. Born in Hungary, he grew up in Cleveland, Ohio, in the United States. After an early career as a journalist and editor, he entered the film industry. His first screenwriting credit was for the film F.I.S.T. (1978). He co-wrote the script for Flashdance, which became one of the highest-grossing films of 1983, and set off a lucrative and prolific run for his career. By the early 1990s, he was known as the highest-paid writer in Hollywood, and noted for his work in the erotic thriller genre. He was paid a then-record $3 million for his script Love Hurts, which was produced as Basic Instinct (1992), and following its success, news outlets reported he earned seven-figure payouts solely on the basis of two- to four-page outlines.

Eszterhas' screenwriting career experienced a decline over the rest of the decade, with films such as Showgirls (1995), Jade (1995), and An Alan Smithee Film: Burn Hollywood Burn (1997) receiving negative reviews and performing poorly at the box office. He mostly withdrew from Hollywood afterward, though he has since authored several books. His publications include American Rhapsody (2000) and two volumes of memoirs: Hollywood Animal (2004), an autobiography, and Crossbearer (2008), which detailed his adulthood return to the Catholic faith he was raised in.

== Personal life ==
Eszterhás was born in Csákánydoroszló, a village in Hungary, to Roman Catholic parents Mária (née Bíró) and István Eszterhás. He was born during World War II, and lived as a child in a refugee camp in Allied-occupied Austria. The family later moved to the United States, living first in Pittsburgh before settling in Cleveland in 1950, where Eszterhas was raised. He attended Ohio University. He decided to pursue writing as a career after winning a competition in 1966 sponsored by the William Randolph Hearst Foundation. The prize was awarded at the White House by then-Vice President Hubert Humphrey.

When Eszterhas was 45, he learned that his father had concealed his World War II collaboration in Hungary's Arrow Cross Party government after the German occupation of Hungary and that he had "organized book burnings and had produced anti-Semitic propaganda."^{p.201} Eszterhas later described his father's antisemitic pamphlets as "like the Hungarian version of Mein Kampf." After this discovery, he cut his father out of his life entirely, never reconciling before his father's death in 2001. He paid for his father's care in later years but was not present at his death, saying in 2024 that "There are moments these many years later that I deeply regret that, and other moments that I'm proud of myself for not going".

Eszterhas had a daughter in 1967 who was put up for adoption at birth. They reunited in 1996. Eszterhas had two children with his first wife, Gerri Javor. The couple divorced in 1994 after nearly 24 years of marriage. That year, he married Naomi Baka, an Ohio native, and they had four sons. As of 2022, Eszterhas lives in the Cleveland suburb of Bainbridge Township, Ohio. After previously living in Malibu, California, he and his wife moved to Bainbridge in 2001, as they felt it provided a better environment to raise their children in. During his first marriage, he was a resident of Tiburon, California.

=== Political views ===
Eszterhas has described himself as an "independent centrist", whose votes for president have included Democrats Bill Clinton and Barack Obama, Independent Ross Perot, and Republicans George W. Bush and Donald Trump. He supported the prime minister of Hungary Viktor Orbán. He has described himself as a staunch supporter of Israel.

== Journalism ==
Eszterhas began his career with a stint at the Dayton Journal Herald, before moving to The Plain Dealer in Cleveland. On an episode of The Joe Rogan Experience, Eszterhas recounted conducting one of the last interviews with Otis Redding, the day before his plane crash the two, "began speaking around midnight after the show at Leo's Casino until 3:30AM in the morning. We did a lot of beer, a lot of Jim Beam, we smoked a lot of really powerful Thai stuff." after which Redding hugged him and called him an affectionate racial epithet.

In November 1969, he broke the story of the My Lai massacre which featured the first publication of photos of the killings. While at The Plain Dealer, he was one of the first reporters to cover the Kent State shootings in 1970. He and fellow Plain Dealer journalist Michael Roberts spent the next three months reporting on the story, and their work was published as the book Thirteen Seconds: Confrontation at Kent State. Eszterhas later joined the staff of Rolling Stone.

One of Eszterhas' articles for The Plain Dealer was the subject of a lawsuit. He had covered the aftermath of the collapse of a bridge across the Ohio River. It included a supposed interview of Margaret Cantrell, the widow of one of the fatal victims of the collapse. Months after the accident, he and a photographer visited her home. She was not there at the time, but he talked to the children as the photographer took photos. His Sunday magazine feature focused on the family's poverty and contained several inaccuracies. Eszterhas had made it seem as though he had spoken to her, describing her mood and attitude in the story. Cantrell filed suit for invasion of privacy, and won a $60,000 judgment. The decision was overturned in the Court of Appeals on First Amendment grounds but the U.S. Supreme Court upheld the original award. Cantrell v. Forest City Publishing (1974) is one of only two false light cases heard by the U.S. Supreme Court.

Eszterhas became a National Book Award nominee for his nonfiction work Charlie Simpson's Apocalypse in 1974. A studio executive who read the book contacted Eszterhas, telling him that it was "very cinematic" and suggested he could be a screenwriter. This motivated him to change careers and start writing scripts.

== Screenwriter ==
Eszterhas' first produced screenplay was F.I.S.T., directed by Norman Jewison. Eszterhas contributed to the script of 1983's Flashdance, and wrote the screenplays for Jagged Edge and Betrayed.

In 1989, Eszterhas planned to leave Creative Artists Agency because an old friend Guy McElwaine was restarting his agency. Michael Ovitz, then the chairman of CAA, threatened to prevent CAA actors from acting in Eszterhas' future projects. Eszterhas penned a letter to Ovitz blasting him for his tactics. Copies of the letter were circulated around Hollywood and the missive was credited with loosening the stranglehold of power that CAA had on the entertainment industry.

A spec script Eszterhas wrote originally titled Love Hurts became the subject of a bidding war amongst various production companies in Hollywood, eventually selling for a then-record $3 million in 1990. The project eventually materialized into Basic Instinct, directed by Dutch filmmaker Paul Verhoeven. Released in 1992 to more than $400 million at the box office, Basic Instinct and its success led to Eszterhas becoming one of the most sought-after screenwriters at the time. By some reports, he earned a total of $26 million for the scripts he wrote in the 1990s.

The following year, Eszterhas re-teamed with Basic Instinct star Sharon Stone for the film Sliver. Sliver did not replicate the box-office success of the former and was critically derided. Eszterhas next wrote the screenplay for Showgirls, his second collaboration with director Verhoeven. Showgirls, which debuted in 1995, was seen as a critical and financial disaster, winning the year's Golden Raspberry Award for "Worst Screenplay". Despite the negative press, the film enjoyed cult success in the home video market, generating more than $100 million from video rentals and becoming one of MGM's top twenty all-time bestsellers. Jade, whose script Eszterhas sold in the wake of Basic Instinct's success, was released three weeks later to low grosses and negative reviews. The one-two punch of back-to-back box-office bombs in the same year saw Eszterhas' reputation as the highest-paid screenwriter take a hit.

In 1997, Eszterhas produced two films, both of which he wrote: Telling Lies in America and An Alan Smithee Film: Burn Hollywood Burn. Burn Hollywood Burn, which is about a director named Alan Smithee who films a big-budget bomb and then tries to destroy it, flopped at the box office. It won several Golden Raspberry Awards, five of them awarded to Eszterhas himself: Worst Picture (Eszterhas was the film's uncredited producer), Worst Screenplay, Worst Original Song, and both Worst New Star and Worst Supporting Actor for a brief on-screen cameo. He has “won” more Golden Raspberry Awards than any other screenwriter in history.

The failure of Burn Hollywood Burn further affected Eszterhas' career: none of the screenplays he wrote between 1997 and 2006 were produced. However, Children of Glory, a Hungarian language film based upon his screenplay, was released in 2006. The film focuses upon both the 1956 Hungarian Revolution and the Blood in the Water match at the 1956 Melbourne Olympics. Children of Glory was entered by invitation in the official section of the 2007 Berlin Film Festival.

=== Feud with Mel Gibson ===
In 2011, it was announced actor-director Mel Gibson had commissioned Eszterhas to write a screenplay: a historical biopic on Judah and the Maccabees, titled M.C.K.B.I. The film was to be distributed by Warner Bros. The announcement generated controversy. In a 2008 interview, Eszterhas wrote that "Mel shared the mind-set of Adolf Hitler."

In a February 2012 interview with Andrew Goldman of The New York Times, Goldman said to Eszterhas: "[Gibson's] film The Passion of the Christ was widely considered anti-Semitic. Then, during a 2006 arrest for drunken driving, he ranted that 'the Jews are responsible for all the wars in the world.' Is he the right director [for the film about Judah Maccabee]?" Eszterhas replied: "Adam Fogelson, Universal Pictures' chairman, said to [Gibson], 'Why do you want to do this story?' Mel said, 'Because I think I should.' I liked that answer very much." When asked about their shared Catholic faith, Eszterhas said of Gibson, "In my mind, his Catholicism is a figment of his imagination."

By April 2012, Warner Bros. had canceled the Maccabee project; the film's last draft was dated February 20, 2012. Eszterhas claimed the break was caused by Gibson's violent outbursts and anti-Semitism, while Gibson blamed a bad script. Eszterhas later wrote a book, Heaven and Mel, about his experiences working with Gibson.

== Other works ==
Eszterhas has written several best-selling books, including Hollywood Animal, an autobiography about politics in Hollywood, which superimposes his life as a young immigrant in the United States on his life as a powerful Hollywood player. His book The Devil's Guide to Hollywood was published in September 2006.

His book Crossbearer: A Memoir of Faith was published in 2008. It tells the story of his return to the Roman Catholic Church and his new-found devotion to God and family after surviving a throat cancer diagnosis in 2001. Eszterhas admitted smoking four packs of Salem Light cigarettes a day, as well as drinking heavily. He underwent surgery to remove 80% of his larynx, and had a trachea fitted. In 2002, he publicly apologized for glamorizing smoking in his films, making this apology in part due his own cancer diagnosis and feeling guilty afterwards.

Eszterhas wrote a book about his experiences with Mel Gibson and anti-Semitism, titled Heaven and Mel, wherein he portrays Gibson as a man fueled only by hatred, prone to violent outbursts. Among many damning statements is Eszterhas' claim that while staying at Gibson's Costa Rican estate to work on a script, he became so afraid that he slept with a golf club in his hand.

== Filmography ==
- F.I.S.T. (1978) – received fee of $85,000 for the script but a record price of $400,000 for the novelization
- Flashdance (1983)
- Blue Thunder (1983) – uncredited rewrite in five days; Eszterhas claims he came up with the ending
- Pals (early 1980s)
- Jagged Edge (1985)
- Big Shots (1987) – sold for $1.25 million
- Hearts of Fire (1987)
- Betrayed (1988)
- Checking Out (1988)
- Music Box (1989)
- Basic Instinct (1992) – received $3 million
- Nowhere to Run (1993)
- Sliver (1993)
- Showgirls (1995) – sold for $2 million
- Jade (1995) – paid $1.5 million for a two-page outline plus $400,000 to executive produce
- One Night Stand (1997) – paid a record $2.5 million for a four-page outline, with an additional $1.5 million to be paid once filming had started. Eszterhas' original script was changed so much he took his name off
- Telling Lies in America (1997)
- An Alan Smithee Film: Burn Hollywood Burn (1997)
- Children of Glory (2006)

== Books ==
- 13 Seconds: Confrontation at Kent State, Dodd: Mead 1970, with Michael Roberts
- Charlie Simpson's Apocalypse, New York: Random House, 1973, ISBN 0-394-48424-X, OCLC 650572.
- Nark!, San Francisco: Straight Arrow Books, 1974
- American Rhapsody, Vintage, 2001, ISBN 978-0-375-41144-1, OCLC 44602385
- Hollywood Animal, Alfred A. Knopf, 2004, ISBN 0-375-41355-3, OCLC 52858561.
- The Devil's Guide to Hollywood, 2006, ISBN 978-0-312-35987-4, OCLC 65207145.
- Crossbearer: A Memoir of Faith, St. Martin's Press, 2008, ISBN 978-0-312-38596-5, OCLC 213300974.
- Heaven and Mel, Amazon Kindle Single, 2012, ASIN B0087PTQ96
