= Rhapsody (Osborne) =

Rhapsody by Willson Osborne is a piece originally composed for solo bassoon and later adapted for clarinet. The composition was first published by Peters in 1958. It is the most frequently performed work in the solo bassoon repertoire.

Osborne recorded the rhapsody in collaboration with Sol Schoenbach for a 1952 radio program of contemporary American music run by WNYC in New York. The piece's working title was "Study for Bassoon", but Osborne intended to make it playable on clarinet as well. According to the composer the piece was written as "abstract music" using "the Oriental technique of variation, in which short song-like fragments are in turn developed". The work is notable for its extensive use of descriptive instructions: only two staves have no such markings.
