= American Rhapsody (book) =

2000 book by Joe Eszterhas

- Author: Joe Eszterhas
- Language: English
- Subject: Clinton–Lewinsky scandal
- Published: 2000
- Publisher: Alfred A. Knopf
- Publication place: United States
- Pages: 432

American Rhapsody is a 2000 book by Joe Eszterhas, primarily about the Bill Clinton-Monica Lewinsky scandal. The Associated Press described the book as "part journalism, part fiction, part personal memoir and part tabloid gossip", in which Eszterhas writes from numerous perspectives, including several figures in the Clinton White House, and at one point, Clinton's penis, which is named "Willard". Eszterhas also writes about his own career in Hollywood, including chapters which negatively depict several celebrities.

Eszterhas told the AP he was angered by Clinton's evasiveness during the scandal, saying "We really did believe in the '60s that the truth shall make us free. Much of our lives, we desperately wanted a president who would tell the truth", and that when Clinton claimed that he "did not have sexual relations with that woman, Miss Lewinsky", Eszterhas found it "unforgivable", and said "in a difficult moment, he couldn't tell us the truth".

The book received mixed reviews, with criticism aimed at Eszterhas's lurid fictionalizations. Bruce Fretts of Entertainment Weekly called it "the Showgirls of political 'journalism' – a work of horrifying tastelessness, yet one so fascinatingly appalling that you simply cannot turn away". Christopher Hitchens, reviewing the book for The New York Times, said that the book's "relatively high points can only call attention to the really low ones". In a starred review, Publishers Weekly called it "outrageously funny" but "flagrantly self-righteous" and "a manic, mouthy, self-indulgent, impossible to ignore lament for America".
