= Bohemian Rhapsody (disambiguation) =

"Bohemian Rhapsody" is a 1975 song by Queen.

Bohemian Rhapsody may also refer to:

- Bohemian Rhapsody (film), 2018, about Freddie Mercury and Queen
  - Bohemian Rhapsody: The Original Soundtrack, 2018
- "Bohemian Rhapsody" (That '70s Show), a TV episode
- "Bohemian Rhapsody (1–5)", episodes of the Stone Ocean story arc of the Japanese manga series JoJo's Bizarre Adventure
- "Bohemian Rhapsody", 14th episode of the Cowboy Bebop anime series

== See also ==
- List of Bohemian Rhapsody cover versions
- The Story of Bohemian Rhapsody, a 2004 documentary about the song by Queen and Freddie Mercury
- "Brohemian Rhapsody", a 2016 song by Blink-182 from California
