= Jagged Edge (film) =

1985 thriller film by Richard Marquand

- Theatrical release poster
- Directed by: Richard Marquand
- Written by: Joe Eszterhas
- Produced by: Martin Ransohoff
- Starring: Glenn Close; Jeff Bridges; Peter Coyote; Robert Loggia
- Cinematography: Matthew F. Leonetti
- Edited by: Sean Barton; Conrad Buff
- Music by: John Barry
- Distributed by: Columbia Pictures
- Release date: October 4, 1985
- Running time: 109 minutes
- Country: United States
- Language: English
- Budget: $10 million
- Box office: $40.5 million

Jagged Edge is a 1985 American neo-noir legal thriller film written by Joe Eszterhas, and directed by Richard Marquand, the last of his films to be released during his lifetime. The film stars Glenn Close, Jeff Bridges, Peter Coyote and Robert Loggia. A lawyer reluctantly takes the case of a man accused of killing his wife, but remains uncertain if he is guilty or not.

The film received positive reviews from critics and was a box office success. Loggia was nominated for the Academy Award for Best Supporting Actor for his performance.

== Plot ==
A masked intruder breaks into the beach house of San Francisco socialite Page Forrester, ties her to her bed, rips open her shirt, and kills her with a hunting knife. The maid is also murdered. Husband Jack Forrester, arrested for her murder, tries to hire high-profile lawyer Teddy Barnes to defend him. Barnes is reluctant to take the case since an incident with district attorney Thomas Krasny, her former boss, caused her to quit practicing criminal law.

Krasny tells Barnes that prisoner Henry Styles hanged himself, which distresses her. Barnes visits Sam Ransom, a private detective who also used to work for Krasny and who changed careers at the same time as Barnes. Barnes decides to take the case.

Barnes and Forrester prepare for the trial and eventually sleep together. Ransom warns Barnes that Forrester is just trying to make her care more about his case. Her office begins receiving anonymous letters containing non-public case details and an analysis shows they were typed on a 1942 Corona typewriter.

In a pre-trial meeting, Barnes tells the judge that Krasny has a history of not meeting discovery obligations. The prosecution's case relies on circumstantial evidence and two of its key witnesses are discredited by Barnes.

Krasny calls Eileen Avery, who had an affair with Forrester, and Bobby Slade, who had an affair with Page, to testify. As Slade details his relationship with Page Forrester, he explains how Forrester manipulates women with his horses. Barnes finds it eerily similar to her own relationship with him. She feels manipulated and briefly believes Forrester is guilty. However, mountains of evidence makes her doubt he is guilty and she continues to defend him.

Another note arrives at her office saying, "He is innocent. Santa Cruz. January 21, 1984. Ask Julie Jensen." Barnes calls Jensen to testify that she was attacked in the same manner as Page Forrester. All the details match, but she says her attacker seemed to stop himself from killing her. As Krasny objects that the attack on Jensen is unrelated to the one on Forrester, he lets slip that his office had investigated the attack and not revealed it in discovery. In chambers, the judge threatens to have Krasny disbarred. Krasny insists that Forrester planned Page's murder for 18 months, he attacked Jensen to create an alibi for himself, and he is the writer of the anonymous letters.

The judge forbids Krasny from presenting his theory to the jury and Forrester is found not guilty. Barnes announces to the media that she left the district attorney's office when Krasny suppressed evidence that proved Henry Styles was innocent. Krasny walks off in disgust.

Barnes goes to Forrester's house to celebrate, and they sleep together again. After waking the next afternoon, she discovers, in a closet, a 1942 Corona typewriter matching the analysis of the anonymous notes. She takes it and flees.

When Forrester calls, she tells him she found the typewriter. Forrester insists on coming over. Barnes calls Ransom, on the brink of telling him that Forrester is the killer, but instead hangs up. A masked figure with a knife breaks in and confronts her in her bedroom. As he starts to attack, Barnes throws back the covers to reveal a handgun. She shoots him several times until he falls to the floor. Ransom comes in and unmasks the attacker: Forrester.

== Cast ==
- Glenn Close as Teddy Barnes
- Jeff Bridges as Jack Forrester
- Peter Coyote as Thomas Krasny
- Robert Loggia as Sam Ransom
- John Dehner as Judge Carrigan
- Karen Austin as Julie Jensen
- Guy Boyd as Matthew Barnes
- Marshall Colt as Bobby Slade
- Louis Giambalvo as Fabrizi
- Ben Hammer as Dr. Goldman
- Lance Henriksen as Frank Martin
- Sanford Jensen as Scott Talbot
- James Karen as Andrew Hardesty
- Leigh Taylor-Young as Virginia Howell
- William Allen Young as Greg Arnold

In addition, Michael Dorn – two years before starting his 30+ years portraying the character Worf in the Star Trek franchise – has his first credited film role, as polygraph analyst Dan Hislan, while Diane Erickson gives testimony as alibi victim Eileen Avery.

== Production ==
According to Joe Eszterhas, the film originated with producer Martin Ransohoff, who wanted to make a courtroom drama in the vein of Anatomy of a Murder. The film was originally written as a vehicle for Jane Fonda, who turned down the project. According to Eszterhas, Ransohoff was unimpressed with the casting of Glenn Close and tried to make her re-shoot a sex scene, so that he could watch her.

== Reception ==
=== Critical response ===
On Rotten Tomatoes the film has an approval rating of 81% based on 31 reviews. The site's consensus states: "Coolly performed and suspenseful, Jagged Edge is a satisfying enough potboiler that most audiences won't mind if the twists don't quite add up." On Metacritic it has a score of 60% based on reviews from 15 critics, indicating "mixed or average" reviews.

Variety called it "a well-crafted, hardboiled mystery" and praised the performances of the two lead actors. Roger Ebert of the Chicago Sun-Times described the suspense in the film as "supremely effective" and rated the movie 3 1/2 stars. Pauline Kael of The New Yorker wrote: "This thriller doesn't offer the pleasures of style, but it does its job. It catches you in a vise – it's scary, and when it's over you feel a little shaken."

Janet Maslin of The New York Times praised the performances, but thought the film predictable. Rita Kempley of The Washington Post denounced the film, saying "Jagged Edge is not entertainment. It is commercially packaged abuse."

=== Box office ===
In the United States and Canada, Jagged Edge grossed $40.5 million at the box office.

== Awards and accolades ==
Robert Loggia was nominated for the Academy Award for Best Supporting Actor for his performance.

== Abandoned sequel ==
Jagged Edge II was initially developed at Columbia Pictures by producer Martin Ransohoff with Glenn Close and Robert Loggia reprising their roles but head of production Guy McElwaine was replaced by David Puttnam, who, according to Ransohoff, said that he did not want to make sequels (Puttnam denied this, saying his problem was the script "wasn't good and for no other reason... when there's a terrific script for Jagged Edge II Columbia will be anxious to make it").

Following Puttnam's departure in 1987, Glenn Close read the script but passed on it so Ransohoff suggested making it with alternative casting. However, Columbia insisted on the sequel starring Close. Ransohoff suggested that Columbia buy out his interest in a sequel but came to an agreement so that he retained a financial interest in a sequel. Ransohoff decided to turn his script into an original story which became the film Physical Evidence. "It's a good mystery on its own terms," he said. "I think the story is really more effective as an original. Because there wasn't an agreement with Loggia and Close, we had always designed the project to go either as a sequel or on its own terms." In 1988, new Columbia president Dawn Steel revived the sequel with Glenn Close and John Stark as producers with Ransohoff no longer involved.

== Remake ==
It was remade into the Hindi film in India as Kasoor (2001).

Sony Pictures announced in April 2018 that a remake of Jagged Edge was in development with Halle Berry starring, but no further announcements were made after July; as of 2026, no such film has been released.
