= Rhapsody (TV program) =

Canadian music television program

- Genre: Music
- Presented by: Joseph Fürst (1958); Jan Rubeš (1959)
- Country of origin: Canada
- Original language: English
- No. of seasons: 1

Production
- Producers: Norman Campbell; Harvey Hart; Franz Kraemer; Mario Prizek; Eric Till
- Running time: 30 minutes

Original release
- Network: CBC Television
- Release: 22 July 1958 – 27 September 1959

Rhapsody is a Canadian music television program that aired on CBC Television from 1958 to 1959.

== Premise ==
This program featured three to four staged sequences of music and dance, led by Ivan Romanoff's orchestra.

== Scheduling ==
This half-hour program was broadcast in the first season on Tuesdays at 10:00 p.m. (Eastern time) from 22 July to 28 October 1958. The second season aired on Sunday evenings from 28 June to 27 September 1959 at 7:30 p.m. except the final two episodes which were rescheduled to 10:00 p.m.
