= Rhapsody: Child of Blood =

Novel by Elizabeth Haydon

- Author: Elizabeth Haydon
- Language: English
- Publication date: 1999

Rhapsody: Child of Blood is a fantasy novel by American writer Elizabeth Haydon, the first book in The Symphony of Ages. It was first published in 1999 by Tor Books. The story is continued in Prophecy: Child of Earth.

== Plot summary ==
The main story begins in Easton, when the protagonist Rhapsody finds herself in jeopardy, having refused the advances of Michael, the self-titled Wind of Death. In her attempt to get away, she falls in with two mysterious men named Grunthor and Achmed and soon finds herself the unwilling accomplice in their own escape. Though they run from their pasts, they eventually realize that no one can outrun their destinies.

== Main characters ==
- Rhapsody – Child of Sky, Namer and Singer. A young woman of human and Lirin descent, she is a talented musician who uses music as a force to change the world around her. Having suffered a great deal of trauma, she's become self-sufficient by necessity but is prone to bouts of melancholy when she thinks about all she has lost. Rhapsody is also unnaturally beautiful as a consequence of her journey, a fact that she refuses to acknowledge and brings her more trouble than fortune.
- Achmed the Snake – Child of Blood, Assassin. A man of unknown age and mixed Dhracian and Firbolg heritage who leads Rhapsody and Grunthor on their journey, and who ultimately (by the climax of this book) unites the Firbolg race in the nation of Ylorc.
- Grunthor – Child of Earth, Warrior. A gigantic man of mixed Firbolg and Bengard descent who is Rhapsody's protector. He is Achmed's loyal sergeant.

== Miscellaneous ==
- F'dor – Race of evil demons born of Fire
- Serendair – Island where Time first began
- Sagia – Oak of Deep Roots
- Daystar Clarion – A Star Sword from Serendair

== Reviews ==
- Review by Avril Brown (2001) in Vector 215
- Review by Chris Gilmore (2001) in Interzone, #164 February 2001
- Review by uncredited (2002) in Vector 221

== See also ==
- Prophecy: Child of Earth
