= F.I.S.T. (film) =

1978 film by Norman Jewison

- Theatrical release poster
- Directed by: Norman Jewison
- Screenplay by: Joe Eszterhas; Sylvester Stallone
- Story by: Joe Eszterhas
- Produced by: Norman Jewison
- Starring: Sylvester Stallone; Rod Steiger; Peter Boyle; Melinda Dillon; David Huffman; Kevin Conway; Tony Lo Bianco
- Cinematography: László Kovács
- Edited by: Graeme Clifford; Antony Gibbs (sup.)
- Music by: Bill Conti
- Production companies: Huron Productions Inc. Chateau Productions
- Distributed by: United Artists
- Release dates: April 13, 1978 (Los Angeles, premiere); April 26, 1978 (U.S.)
- Running time: 145 minutes
- Country: United States
- Language: English
- Budget: $8 million
- Box office: $28 million

F.I.S.T. (stylized on-screen as F•I•S•T) is a 1978 American epic period crime drama film produced and directed by Norman Jewison. It stars Sylvester Stallone, Rod Steiger, and Peter Boyle, and features supporting roles by Melinda Dillon, David Huffman, Kevin Conway and Tony Lo Bianco, as well as a young Anthony Kiedis in his film debut. Stallone also co-wrote the screenplay with Joe Eszterhas. The film is about Johnny Kovak (Stallone), a Cleveland warehouse worker who becomes involved in the labor union leadership of the fictional "Federation of Inter-State Truckers" (F.I.S.T.). As he successfully organizes strikes and expands union membership, he becomes entangled with organized crime to gain leverage. While this alliance helps him secure victories, it also corrupts the union.

The development of F.I.S.T. began when executive producer Gene Corman, inspired by Joe Eszterhas' investigative work on labor unions, brought him on to write. Eszterhas grounded the story in reality by traveling the Midwest and interviewing workers, producing a 40-page treatment that evolved into a sprawling 500-page draft with director Norman Jewison. Sylvester Stallone was cast in the lead role before Rocky (1976) had premiered, and despite skyrocketing fame after its release, he honored his verbal commitment, even helping shape the script and his character, Johnny Kovak. Stallone viewed F.I.S.T. as a test of his range, aiming to break away from his underdog image. Though many critics and viewers drew parallels between Kovak and Jimmy Hoffa, the filmmakers denied a direct connection. Filming took place primarily in Dubuque, Iowa chosen for its preserved industrial aesthetic, to evoke 1930s Cleveland, Ohio.

Critical reaction to F.I.S.T. was sharply divided, with some praising its ambition and scope while others found it overblown and unfocused. Supporters admired its gritty depiction of labor struggles, strong cinematography, and Stallone’s grounded early performance, viewing the film as an earnest exploration of corruption and moral compromise. They highlighted its visual authenticity, emotional weight, and willingness to tackle serious social themes uncommon in Hollywood at the time. Detractors, however, criticized it for being formulaic, uneven, and self-indulgent, arguing that its narrative collapsed midway and relied too heavily on clichés from gangster and political dramas. Many felt the film lacked emotional depth, coherence, and the heartfelt sincerity that made Rocky resonate, ultimately seeing F.I.S.T. as a noble but flawed attempt at a social epic.

== Plot ==
At a loading dock in Cleveland in 1937, supervisor Mr. Gant hires a new worker, Lincoln Dombrowsky. Gant tells Dombrowsky that he will only be paid for his regular shift even if he must work overtime, and that any merchandise he damages will come directly out of his pay. When Dombrowsky drops a few carts of tomatoes, his pay is docked and another worker is fired for helping him collect the fallen merchandise. Resentful of these unfair labor practices, Hungarian-American worker Johnny Kovak leads a riot. The laborers go to the office of Boss Andrews, where Kovak believes he negotiates a deal for the workers, only to find out the next day that he and his friend Abe Belkin have been fired.

Kovak and Belkin are approached by Mike Monahan, who was impressed by their leadership. He offers them positions in the Federation of Inter State Truckers (F.I.S.T.), where they will be paid according to how many members they can recruit. Kovak is given a car to use while recruiting, which also allows him to meet and soon start dating Lithuanian-American worker Anna Zarinkas. Kovak is successfully recruiting new F.I.S.T. members, which attracts attention from business owners. When Kovak turns down their offer to recruit new workers to their non-union trucking firms, the shady owners have him physically attacked. Kovak rises into a leadership role through his union recruiting, causing competition with hothead F.I.S.T. leader Max Graham.

Soon Monahan, Kovak and Belkin begin working to get the F.I.S.T. members at Consolidated Trucking covered by a labor agreement. When management refuses to deal with them, the F.I.S.T. workers strike. They set up camp outside Consolidated Trucking's gates, but are pushed out by strikebreakers and hired security. Monahan tries to ram the gates in a truck, but is shot and killed. At his funeral, Kovak decides to "get some muscle" and accepts help from Vince Doyle, a local gangster. Doyle's men attack trucks trying to make deliveries. Local mobsters and the members of F.I.S.T. join forces to storm the gates of Consolidated Trucking. The president of Consolidated Trucking finally signs a labor agreement.

Building on this success, Kovak and Belkin travel the Midwest to recruit more workers. Kovak becomes wealthier and marries Anna Zarinkas. A new crime figure, Anthony "Babe" Milano, comes on the scene and wants a piece of the action. Kovak meets Milano with Doyle and, although reluctant to involve him in his business, decides it will be best for now.

By 1958, F.I.S.T. has become a large and important union, with about two million members. When Kovak visits Max Graham at F.I.S.T. headquarters, he is displeased to see how luxurious the building and Graham's offices are. Kovak visits with Belkin, now leading F.I.S.T. business on the West Coast, who explains that Graham has made money unethically off the union. In his investigation, Kovak finds that Graham used his influence to steer union businesses and funds to shell companies owned by him or his wife, and has used violence against the wife of Frank Vasko, a trucking company owner who resisted the union.

Graham is a strong favorite to be elected F.I.S.T. president. Belkin suggests to Kovak that they turn Graham in to the authorities, but Kovak is too worried about the damage to the union from the scandal. Kovak confronts Graham with what he knows, convincing him to support Kovak's run for union president.

Now the newly elected president of F.I.S.T., Kovak is investigated by Senator Andrew Madison, who suspects Kovak of ties with the Mafia through his work with gangsters Doyle and Milano. Belkin urges Kovak to cut off Milano and make the union "clean again", but Kovak ignores his request. When Doyle later tells Kovak that Belkin plans to testify against them, Kovak insists that Belkin not be harmed.

Subpoenaed to testify before Senator Madison's committee, Kovak is told that Belkin has been killed and Madison believes Kovak is responsible. Shocked, Kovak has an emotional outburst and storms out of the hearing. He returns home to find Anna and his sons Kevin and Michael are missing. He gets his pistol but is shot and presumably killed by Milano's men. The movie ends with a shot of a bumper sticker on a truck which reads, "Where's Johnny?"

== Cast ==
- Sylvester Stallone as Johnny Kovak
- Rod Steiger as Senator Andrew Madison
- Peter Boyle as Max Graham
- Melinda Dillon as Anna Zarinkas Kovak
- David Huffman as Abe Belkin
- Kevin Conway as Vince Doyle
- Tony Lo Bianco as Anthony "Babe" Milano
- Cassie Yates as Molly
- Peter Donat as Arthur St. Clair
- John Lehne as Mr. Gant
- Henry Wilcoxon as Win Talbot
- Richard Herd as Mike Monahan
- Tony Mockus Jr. as Tom Higgins
- Ken Kercheval as Bernie Marr
- Elena Karam as Mrs. Zarinkas
- Joe Tornatore as Angel
- James Karen as Boss Andrews
- Stuart Gillard as Phil Talbot
- Brian Dennehy as Frank Vasko
- Sam Chew Jr. as Peter Jacobs
- Robert Lipton as Dave Roberts
- John Bleifer as Mishka
- Frank McRae as Lincoln Dombrowsky
- Rozsika Halmos as Mrs. Kovak
- Earl Montgomery as Russell Langley
- Nada Rowand as Mrs. Vasko
- Chuck Gradi as "Jugs" Jugovich
- Reid Cruickshanks as McGuinn
- Anthony Kiedis as Kevin Kovak
- Tony Mendia as Michael Kovak
- Deanne Fator as Aggie Vasko
- Jack Slate as Bob Wilson
- James Jeter as Mike Quinn
- John Bleifer as Mishka
- Bruce McGill as Hitman (uncredited)

== Production ==
=== Development and writing ===
Producer Gene Corman was inspired to develop a story about labor unions after reading Joe Eszterhas’ investigative magazine pieces on the subject. United Artists backed the idea and hired Eszterhas to write the script, despite the fact that he had never written one before. Determined to root the story in reality, Eszterhas traveled through the American Midwest, interviewing workers about their experiences with unionization. By fall 1975, he had compiled a forty-page treatment, which laid the foundation for the project.

Director Norman Jewison came on board later that same year, United Artists's chairman of the board Arthur B. Krim hired him in the position of producer-director and offered him a $4 million budget if Jewison could match it with another $4 million. He eventually failed to find another studio to co-finance the film and received a full $8.1 million budget regardless. Eszterhas expanded the outline into a massive 500-page draft and then collaborated with Jewison to trim it down to 240 pages by 1976. Eszterhas originally envisioned the role of Johnny Kovak with Jack Nicholson, but Sylvester Stallone was cast instead.

Director Jewison recalled casting Stallone in F.I.S.T. at a pivotal moment, just before Rocky (1976), in which Stallone starred as the lead, had been released. At the time, Stallone was still an up-and-coming actor, not yet a household name. Jewison had seen a preview of Rocky and was convinced Stallone was ideal for the role of Kovak. He sent him the script, and Stallone agreed to take the part. But once Rocky became a surprise blockbuster and launched Stallone into stardom, million-dollar offers quickly followed. With only a verbal agreement in place, Jewison called to confirm Stallone's commitment. Stallone did not hesitate: “Norman, this is my picture.”

On his character and choice Stallone said "I wanted F.I.S.T. to test myself, to see whether I was a one-character actor, a phony. After people come out of a theater, I think they're going to say, 'Jeez. I didn't think he could do that.' Most people think I can only drool and act at the same time, play with a runny nose and sniffles and maybe they'll say, 'Hey, this is quite a stretch. I mean, in Rocky he comes out playing a moron and now he's playing a man, a leader of men, instead of a follower of men. It's not like Rocky as an underdog, Johnny will be an underdog half the movie, and then he's an overdog in the end; he's up there looking down."

Once Stallone signed on to play the lead, he further helped pare the screenplay to a more manageable 150 pages. Jewison explained that Stallone had a hand in shaping the character of Johnny Kovak, particularly by refining his dialogue and scenes with his love interest Anna Zarinkas played by Melinda Dillon. On his writing involvement Stallone said that "Joe Eszterhas wrote a script that was nearly 400 pages and was more of a novel than a shootable screenplay. A great deal of work was done by myself, along with Norman Jewison, to hammer it into shape, but Joe had conceived a great idea."

The director rejected claims that the lead character Kovak was modeled after missing Teamsters boss Jimmy Hoffa, even as multiple outlets made the connection. On that matter Eszterhas said "that's unfair to the memory of Hoffa, Johnny Kovak kills a man in the film and makes a deal with the mob. Hoffa never did that. In my original screenplay, Johnny also was directly responsible for the death of his best friend and he had an affair with a girl. Hoffa lived an almost monastic life."

=== Filming ===
The filming was done in Dubuque, Iowa, instead of Cleveland, Ohio, where the movie takes place in its depression-era flats. Jewison explained "we looked at Cleveland first, but they've run a freeway through one section (of the Flats), and there are enough new buildings to threaten the older appearance. From there, we looked at maybe 40 or 50 cities: Buffalo, Toronto, Akron, St. Louis, Milwaukee, Minneapolis, Seattle, Cincinnati, Youngstown and more, but usually we only found empty warehouses."

Dubuque provided a recently vacated industrial site that was transformed to resemble Depression-era Cleveland, complete with fictional business fronts like Fleckner Foods Co. and Consolidated Trucking Co. The city offered a key visual advantage for wide shots as well due to one of the country's oldest cable systems, there were no modern TV antennas cluttering the skyline, preserving the illusion of the 1930s. To further sell the period atmosphere, the production had to combat an unexpected challenge: Dubuque's clean air. With permission from Iowa's Department of Environmental Quality, the filmmakers used smudge pots to release thick, industrial-looking smoke, giving the Dubuque Flats of 1977 the gritty look of Cleveland's Flats during the Great Depression.

Some filming was also done in the English city of Sheffield, Washington D.C. and Culver City Studios. Jewison was struck by Stallone's dedication, later praising his professionalism on set, pointing out that he had memorized the entire script, not just his own lines, making rehearsals almost unnecessary.

== Release ==
=== Theatrical ===
The film premiered as the Gala Opening Night film at Filmex on April 13, 1978, at the Plitt Theatre in Century City and was released in 100 theaters in the United States and Canada on April 26, 1978, before expanding to 350 on June 21.

=== Home media ===
The film was released on Blu-Ray in the United States by Kino Lorber in February 2015.

== Reception ==
=== Box office ===
The film grossed $20,388,920 in the United States and Canada and $28 million worldwide on an $8 million total budget but was considered a disappointment as it was not as successful as Stallone's previous film Rocky (1976).

=== Divided critical response ===
The film received a wide split between reviews and audience reaction. This surprised writer Joe Eszterhas, who said, "I don't know how you can open to record-breaking business in cities like Toronto and Honolulu, and soft business in cities like Los Angeles and Detroit."

On Rotten Tomatoes, the film holds a score of 67% based on 12 reviews. On Metacritic it has a 54% score.

==== Positive reviews ====
Vincent Canby of The New York Times wrote: "F.I.S.T. is a big movie that benefits from the accumulating of small, ordinary detail than from any particular wit or inspiration of vision....Like Fiddler on the Roof, Jesus Christ Superstar and Rollerball, Mr. Jewison's last three films, F.I.S.T. is a massive, essentially shapeless film, but because it's about a terrifically interesting, complicated subject, shapeliness doesn't seem especially important. There's not a moment in it to compare with the intensity of feelings contained in such documentaries as Union Maids and Harlan County, U.S.A, yet it's encouraging to hear Hollywood talking about such things at a time when play-it-safe is virtually industry policy.”

Another positive review came from TV Guide, which gave the film three stars out of four. They praised Stallone's script and acting, saying that "Stallone likes to depart himself from his muscles, it usually doesn't work. But, with F.I.S.T. it works well as he cares more about the character than anything else, something we'd like to see more of."

In Desmond Ryan's review in The Philadelphia Inquirer, F.I.S.T. is described as a flawed yet absorbing film that simplifies complex issues but delivers emotional impact. He praises Stallone's grounded performance as Johnny Kovak and highlights the film's strong first half, which charts Kovak's rise through the labor movement. While Ryan critiques the film's broad portrayals of villains and moral conflicts, he commends its exploration of compromise and corruption, as well as its strong visuals and supporting cast.

In its review, Variety praises F.I.S.T. as a powerful labor drama, likening its rise-and-fall narrative to All the King’s Men but set within the American union movement. The main praise went towards the film's first hour which vividly captures the gritty world of 1930s unorganized labor, and Tony Lo Bianco's compelling performance as the embodiment of organized crime Anthony "Babe" Milano.

In his review for The Home News, Ted Serrill calls F.I.S.T. a well-crafted and engaging film. Serrill notes the film's use of fictional surrogates to parallel real-life figures like Jimmy Hoffa and Senator John McClellan, with a story that blends historical inspiration and dramatized events. While he points out that the film occasionally blurs fact and fiction to the point of distraction, he finds it absorbing, with strong performances from Stallone and Melinda Dillon. He commends Norman Jewison's direction, László Kovács’ rich cinematography, and the film's sharp editing. Though he thought the film's moral ambiguity may leave some viewers too sympathetic to Kovak's choices, Serrill finds F.I.S.T. to be a powerful, well-acted production that largely succeeds on both dramatic and technical fronts.

In her review for the Des Moines Register, Joan Bunke praises F.I.S.T. as a vivid and emotionally powerful portrait of American labor struggles, led by a strong performance from Sylvester Stallone. She compares Stallone's screen presence to Rocky, noting he excels at playing the "little guy" fighting the system. However, she criticizes his tendency to mumble in a Marlon Brando-like fashion. Still, Bunke commends the film's rich visual detail, especially László Kovács’ cinematography, and highlights strong supporting performances from David Huffman and Tony Lo Bianco. Despite a few abrupt transitions and a lengthy runtime, she sees F.I.S.T. as a gripping, morally complex film about power, loyalty, and the cost of compromise.

In his review published in the Intelligencer Journal, David Sterritt praised F.I.S.T. as a strong and thought-provoking film that showcases Sylvester Stallone’s depth beyond Rocky. He noted that Stallone handles the demanding role of Johnny Kovak, a laborer who rises to union power with shades of Jimmy Hoffa, with conviction, maturity, and surprising emotional range. Sterritt highlighted Norman Jewison’s direction and László Kovács’ cinematography for giving the story both grit and visual sweep, capturing the evolution from Cleveland’s blue-collar streets to Washington’s political grandeur. While he found some of the dialogue overly self-conscious, he concluded that F.I.S.T. proves Stallone is a true movie star capable of carrying a complex film on his shoulders.

==== Lower rated and negative reviews ====
In his review for The Dissolve, Noel Murray, who gives it three stars, describes F.I.S.T. as an ambitious but uneven effort from Sylvester Stallone, who aimed to follow Rocky with a sweeping labor drama. While the film has visual strength and standout moments, it suffers from a predictable message, a scattered lead performance, and a script that lacks the nuance of better 1970s social dramas. Despite its flaws, Murray credits director Norman Jewison and his creative team with giving the film the polish and scale of a major production, even if the content does not fully live up to it.

In his Miami Herald review, John Huddy describes F.I.S.T. as an ambitious, large-scale portrayal of American labor history that begins with striking imagery of steel mills and ends in the halls of the U.S. Senate. While Huddy praises the film's middle section for its vivid, violent depiction of strike action and the powerful momentum it gains there, he finds the overall film cold and overly broad. He feels that Jewison's direction lacks emotional depth and that Stallone, though commanding and charismatic, fails to fully inhabit his character. Despite standout moments and visual flair from cinematographer László Kovács, Huddy ultimately argues that F.I.S.T. lacks the vitality and nuance to match its epic ambitions.

Rick Chatenever of The Santa Cruz Sentinel described F.I.S.T. as a strong, well-acted film that ultimately loses its power midway through. He praised Sylvester Stallone for proving his talent extended beyond Rocky, calling his portrayal of union leader Johnny Kovak both commanding and emotionally nuanced. Chatenever also highlighted standout performances from Rod Steiger, Peter Boyle, Melinda Dillon and David Huffman, as well as László Kovács’ evocative cinematography in the film’s Depression-era settings. However, he felt the film faltered in its second half, becoming overextended and losing focus as Kovak’s rise to power devolved into a gangster caricature. He attributed this decline to Jewison’s direction and Joe Eszterhas’ writing, noting their attempt to draw too much symbolic weight from the Jimmy Hoffa-inspired story. He concluded that while F.I.S.T. begins with emotional impact and authenticity, it ultimately unravels into a heavy-handed, uneven effort that pales in comparison to The Godfather.

A negative review came from Richard Schickel of Time, who said that the film "stands for nearly 2 1/2 hours of almost unmitigated boredom—a misfired would-be proletarian epic with Sylvester Stallone misplaying the Jimmy Hoffa part with a self-confidence that borders on the sublime."

R.D. Heldenfels of the Daily Press dismissed F.I.S.T. as a formulaic and uninspired film that failed to capture the heart that made Rocky succeed. He described it as a confused mix of conflicting ideas and heavy-handed direction, arguing that its portrayal of the labor movement was reduced to repetitive violence and simplistic moral contrasts. The subplots, Johnny’s romance and his friendship with Abe, were seen as predictable and emotionally hollow, echoing clichés from earlier gangster films. Heldenfels found Jewison’s direction overly slick and artificial, with scenes staged for effect rather than realism, and while supporting actors like David Huffman and Kevin Conway were commended, Stallone’s performance was deemed lifeless. He concluded that despite its energy and ambition, F.I.S.T. lacked the sincerity and conviction needed to make audiences care.

Daniel Ruth of The Tampa Tribune criticized F.I.S.T. as an overblown, ego driven vehicle for Sylvester Stallone, arguing that the film collapses under the weight of its star’s self importance. While Ruth acknowledged moments of strong filmmaking and an intriguing study of power and corruption, he felt the movie was too long, uneven, and far too similar to Rocky, dubbing it Rocky Goes to Washington. Stallone’s attempts to prove his dramatic range, Ruth wrote, result in forced performances and recycled scenes, particularly in Kovak’s romance and rise to leadership. He also faulted director Norman Jewison for a lack of cohesion and reliance on stereotypes, though he praised the supporting cast, notably Peter Boyle, Rod Steiger and Tony Lo Bianco, for bringing depth when given the chance. Despite its promising premise about the American labor movement, Ruth concluded that F.I.S.T. punches below its weight, landing as more of a “sucker punch” than a knockout.

Stanley Eichelbaum of The San Francisco Examiner gave F.I.S.T. two stars, calling it an ambitious but uneven follow-up to Rocky. He praised the film’s early scenes for vividly capturing the grit of Depression-era labor struggles with the energy of social realism but felt the story quickly lost momentum. He noted that Jewison began with strong direction and pace but gradually lost control of the material, leading to a muddled second half weighed down by clichés and uncertainty about how to end. Stallone’s performance, he wrote, started off convincing and energetic but became less credible as his character ages. Supporting roles, he added, lacked dimension, with only Rod Steiger standing out for his nuance. Ultimately, he concluded that F.I.S.T. tried to mix the weight of All the King’s Men with the scope of The Godfather but collapsed under its own ambition.
