= List of Murder, She Wrote episodes =

This is a list of Murder, She Wrote episodes in the order that they originally aired on CBS. Most of the episodes took place either in Jessica Fletcher's fictional hometown of Cabot Cove, Maine, or in New York City, but her travels promoting books or visiting relatives and friends led to cases throughout the United States and around the world.

After the final episode of the television series aired in 1996, Angela Lansbury sporadically reprised the character of Jessica Fletcher in a handful of feature-length Murder, She Wrote specials starting in 1997. The last TV movie aired in May 2003. In February 2007, on the ABC daytime talk show The View, Lansbury announced that she hoped to make another Murder, She Wrote TV movie in the near future but only if her son, director Anthony Shaw, could find a suitable story.

== Series overview ==
Season	Episodes	Originally released		Rank	Rating
Season	Episodes	First released	Last released	Rank	Rating
1	22	September 30, 1984	April 21, 1985	8	20.1
2	22	September 29, 1985	May 18, 1986	3	25.3
3	22	September 28, 1986	May 10, 1987	4	25.4
4	22	September 20, 1987	May 8, 1988	9	20.2
5	22	October 23, 1988	May 21, 1989	8	19.9
6	22	September 24, 1989	May 20, 1990	13	17.7 (Note: Tied with Chicken Soup.)
7	22	September 16, 1990	May 12, 1991	12	16.4
8	22	September 15, 1991	May 17, 1992	8	16.9
9	22	September 20, 1992	May 16, 1993	5	17.7
10	21	September 12, 1993	May 22, 1994	11	16.0
11	21	September 25, 1994	May 14, 1995	8	15.6 (Note: Tied with Friends.)
12	24	September 21, 1995	May 19, 1996	58	9.50
Movies	4	November 2, 1997	May 9, 2003	—N/a	—N/a

== Episodes ==
=== Season 1 (1984–85) ===
No. overall	No. in season	Title	Directed by	Written by	Original release date	Prod. code	Rating/share (households)
1	1	"The Murder of Sherlock Holmes"	Corey Allen	Story by : Richard Levinson and William Link & Peter S. Fischer; Teleplay by : Peter S. Fischer	September 30, 1984	59274	18.9/29
Jessica attends a costume party where "Sherlock Holmes" is murdered. Guest stars: Eddie Barth, Ned Beatty, Bert Convy, Ellen Crawford, Richard Erdman, Anne Francis, Arthur Hill, Brian Keith, Dennis Patrick, Raymond St. Jacques, Danny Wells Note: As a two-hour series premiere, the episode is split into two parts for syndication.
2	2	"Deadly Lady"	Corey Allen	Peter S. Fischer	October 7, 1984	59206	20.3/31
A multimillionaire appears to have drowned during a hurricane. Guest stars: Doran Clark, Howard Duff, Marilyn Hassett, Richard Hatch, Anne Lockhart, Dack Rambo, Cassie Yates Note: The first episode set in Cabot Cove.
3	3	"Birds of a Feather"	John Llewellyn Moxey	Robert Swanson	October 14, 1984	59203	19.4/29
Jessica Fletcher travels to San Francisco to visit her niece, Victoria Brandon (Genie Francis), who is preparing to marry Howard Griffin (Jeff Conaway). The voluble Howard is accused of murdering his employer, Al Drake, the owner of a local drag nightclub. Guest stars: Bart Braverman, Dick Gautier, Harry Guardino, Gabe Kaplan, Martin Landau, Carol Lawrence, Barbara Rhoades
4	4	"Hooray for Homicide"	Richard Colla	Robert Van Scoyck	October 28, 1984	59201	19.7/29
Jessica is suspected of murdering movie producer Jerry Lydecker (John Saxon) who wanted to turn her novel into a trashy film. Guest stars: Melissa Sue Anderson, John Astin, Samantha Eggar, James MacArthur, Virginia Mayo, Ron Palillo, Jose Perez, Morgan Stevens, Lyle Waggoner
5	5	"It's a Dog's Life"	Seymour Robbie	Mark Giles & Linda Shank	November 4, 1984	59208	16.9/24
In the deaths of a wealthy Virginia eccentric and his daughter (Dan O'Herlihy and Lenore Kasdorf), the man's dog is the prime suspect. Guest stars: Cathryn Damon, Dean Jones, Jared Martin, Dan O'Herlihy, Lynn Redgrave, Forrest Tucker, Gregory Walcott, Sandy Ward
6	6	"Lovers and Other Killers"	Allen Reisner	Peter S. Fischer	November 18, 1984	59207	19.1/27
Jessica sets out to prove her secretary isn't a murder suspect. Guest stars: Grant Goodeve, Peter Graves, Greg Morris, Lois Nettleton, Andrew Prine, Andrew Stevens
7	7	"Hit, Run and Homicide"	Alan Cooke	Gerald K. Siegel	November 25, 1984	59216	19.7/29
An eccentric inventor is accused of murdering his former partner. Guest stars: Edward Albert, June Allyson, Patti D'Arbanville, Van Johnson, Stuart Whitman
8	8	"We're Off to Kill the Wizard"	Walter Grauman	Story by : Peter S. Fischer & Gerald K. Siegel; Teleplay by : Peter S. Fischer	December 9, 1984	59204	22.3/32
A tycoon (James Coco)'s theme-park plans end in murder. Guest stars: Christine Belford, Kim Darby, George DiCenzo, Gene Evans, Vince Howard, Richard Sanders, John Schuck, James Stephens, Kristoffer Tabori
9	9	"Death Takes a Curtain Call"	Allen Reisner	Paul W. Cooper	December 16, 1984	59219	16.2/24
A special night at the ballet turns grisly when Jessica encounters murder. Guest stars: Kerry Armstrong, Dane Clark, William Conrad, George De La Peña, Hurd Hatfield, Paul Ryan Rudd
10	10	"Death Casts a Spell"	Allen Reisner	J. Miyoko Hensley & Steven Hensley	December 30, 1984	59211	22.3/34
A renowned hypnotist (José Ferrer) with a shady past is murdered in front of a group of journalists who were all put in a trance by the victim and remember nothing. Guest stars: Diana Canova, Murray Hamilton, Robert Hogan, Conrad Janis, Elaine Joyce, Brian Kerwin, Robert Loggia, Michelle Phillips
11	11	"Capitol Offense"	John Llewellyn Moxey	Peter S. Fischer	January 6, 1985	59220	22.4/31
Jessica is assigned to replace a deceased Maine congressman in Washington, D.C. Guest stars: Edie Adams, Herschel Bernardi, Linda Kelsey, Stephen Macht, Nicholas Pryor, Mitchell Ryan, Gary Sandy, Mark Shera
12	12	"Broadway Malady"	Hy Averback	Tom B. Sawyer	January 13, 1985	59209	21.8/31
Assault and murder could end the comeback of a musical theatre actress (Vivian Blaine) in a play with her daughter (Lorna Luft). Guest stars: Milton Berle, Elaine Giftos, Gregg Henry, Robert Morse, Patrick O'Neal, Barbara Whinnery
13	13	"Murder to a Jazz Beat"	Walter Grauman	Story by : Paul Savage & David Abramowitz; Teleplay by : Paul Savage	February 3, 1985	59212	22.0/30
Jessica searches for clues when a famous musician drops dead onstage in the Big Easy. Guest stars: Olivia Cole, Bradford Dillman, George Kirby, Cameron Mitchell, Garrett Morris, Ed Nelson, Clive Revill, Stan Shaw, Bobby Sherman, Glynn Turman
14	14	"My Johnny Lies Over the Ocean"	Seymour Robbie	Peter S. Fischer	February 10, 1985	59210	19.9/31
Jessica's niece (Belinda Montgomery), recovering from her husband's suicide, is terrorized aboard a cruise during which a suspicious death occurs. Guest stars: Paul Carafotes, Jason Evers, Rosemary Forsyth, Lynda Day George, Vicki Lawrence, Belinda Montgomery, Leslie Nielsen, Andrew Parks, Lawrence Pressman, JoAnne Worley
15	15	"Paint Me a Murder"	John Llewellyn Moxey	Peter S. Fischer	February 17, 1985	59215	20.5/30
A famous artist (Cesar Romero)'s birthday celebration ends tragically when he is murdered at his island villa. Guest stars: Fernando Allende, Capucine, Judy Geeson, Robert Goulet, Stewart Granger, Steven Keats, Ron Moody, Cristina Raines
16	16	"Tough Guys Don't Die"	Seymour Robbie	Peter S. Fischer	February 24, 1985	59223	21.7/30
In an homage to hardboiled detective fiction of the first half of the Twentieth Century (e.g., The Maltese Falcon), Jessica investigates the murder of private eye Harry McGraw (Jerry Orbach)'s partner, Archie Miles. (Note: Whose name is an inversion of the name of Sam Spade's partner in the Maltese Falcon, Miles Archer.) Guest stars: Barbara Babcock, John Furey, Nancy Lee Grahn, John McMartin, Gerald S. O'Loughlin, Alex Rocco, Fritz Weaver, Paul Winfield
17	17	"Sudden Death"	Edward M. Abroms	Robert Swanson	March 3, 1985	59217	21.6/31
Jessica inherits part of a pro-football team. Guest stars: John Beck, Warren Berlinger, Dick Butkus, David Doyle, Bruce Jenner, Gary Lockwood, James McEachin, Allan Miller, Jan Smithers, Tim Thomerson
18	18	"Footnote to Murder"	Peter Crane	Robert Swanson	March 10, 1985	59221	19.7/29
Jessica Fletcher travels to New York City for a literary awards event, where an unpublished manuscript is stolen and its author is murdered. Jessica tries to prove that gentle, eccentric, and perpetually tipsy poet Horace Lynchfield (Paul Sand) is innocent when he falls under suspicion. Guest stars: Vincent Baggetta, Talia Balsam, Morgan Brittany, Constance Forslund, Pat Harrington, Kenneth Mars, Diana Muldaur, Robert Reed
19	19	"Murder Takes the Bus"	Walter Grauman	Michael Scheff & Mary Ann Kasica	March 17, 1985	59231	22.4/34
Jessica's bus trip to nearby Portland takes a dismal turn when a passenger is murdered and a bus full of possible to likely suspects. Guest stars: Linda Blair, John Davis Chandler, Michael Constantine, Terence Knox, Larry Linville, Rue McClanahan, Albert Salmi, Don Stroud, Mills Watson, David Wayne
20	20	"Armed Response"	Charles S. Dubin	Gerald K. Siegel	March 31, 1985	59228	21.2/30
Jessica, hospitalized with a fractured leg, investigates the murder of a fellow patient. Guest stars: Eddie Bracken, Victoria Carroll, Stephen Elliott, James Gammon, Sam Groom, Bo Hopkins, Martin Kove, Kay Lenz, Kevin McCarthy, Susan Oliver, Martha Raye
21	21	"Murder at the Oasis"	Arthur Allan Seidelman	Robert Van Scoyk	April 7, 1985	59222	20.4/33
Jessica investigates the death of her college roommate's husband. Guest stars: Ed Ames, Joey Bishop, Joseph Bottoms, Joseph Cali, Ken Howard, Piper Laurie, Jack O'Halloran, Linda Purl
22	22	"Funeral at Fifty-Mile"	Seymour Robbie	Dick Nelson	April 21, 1985	59226	24.5/39
Jessica attends a funeral and solves the murder of another attendee, who had been most unwanted. Guest stars: Noah Beery Jr., Kathleen Beller, J.D. Cannon, Clu Gulager, Donald Moffat, Jeff Osterhage, Cliff Potts, Stella Stevens Note: This episode features the first appearance of William Windom, who plays a different role in this (Sam Breen) than he did starting in Season 2 (Seth Hazlitt), the latter of whom made recurring appearances.

=== Season 2 (1985–86) ===
No. overall	No. in season	Title	Directed by	Written by	Original release date	Prod. code	Rating/share (households)
23	1	"Widow, Weep for Me"	Michael A. Hoey	Peter S. Fischer	September 29, 1985	60309	24.4/37
Jessica checks into a tropical hotel under an assumed name and a quite different personality to find the killer of her friend (and some other wealthy women). Guest stars: Len Cariou, Cyd Charisse, Mel Ferrer, Howard Hesseman, John Phillip Law, Anne Lockhart, Raymond St. Jacques, Mary Wickes
24	2	"Joshua Peabody Died Here...Possibly"	Peter Crane	Tom B. Sawyer	October 6, 1985	60305	23.5/35
A cheap tycoon with many enemies is found dead on the construction site of his high-rise hotel. Guest stars: Chuck Connors, John Ericson, Meg Foster, Michael Sarrazin, David Sheiner
25	3	"Murder in the Afternoon"	Arthur Allan Seidelman	Story by : Paul W. Cooper; Teleplay by : Paul Savage	October 13, 1985	60302	24.9/37
Jessica's niece (Alice Krige), an actress in a soap opera, becomes a murder suspect after the show's hated producer (Jessica Walter) is murdered. This is actor Lloyd Nolan's final role; he was visibly ill during the filming and died September 27, 1985, 16 days before the episode was broadcast. Guest stars: William Atherton, Paul Burke, Nicholas Hammond, Terry Kiser, Robert Lipton, Lloyd Nolan, Mackenzie Phillips, Lurene Tuttle, Robert Walden
26	4	"School for Scandal"	Arthur Allan Seidelman	Robert E. Swanson	October 20, 1985	60314	23.8/35
When preparing to provide a speech for a graduation ceremony at the prestigious Crenshaw College where she is also to receive an honorary degree, Jessica attends a party with the faculty staff that is hosted by Dr. Jocelyn Laird. The party soon becomes animated when Dr. Laird's daughter, Daphne Clover, and her drunk boyfriend Nick Fulton gate-crash the scene. The next morning, Jessica is shocked to discover Nick dead at a construction site on the campus grounds. Police reveal that the victim was killed elsewhere, and soon Laird and her daughter come under suspicion. Jessica decides to investigate, discovering both are willing to take the blame, leading her to suspect a third party was involved in the murder. Guest stars: Polly Bergen, Darleen Carr, Jack Kehoe, June Lockhart, Roddy McDowall, Mary Kate McGeehan, Morgan Stevens, John Vernon
27	5	"Sing a Song of Murder"	John Llewellyn Moxey	Peter S. Fischer	October 27, 1985	60306	21.1/29
In London, Jessica's identical cousin Emma McGill is the co-owner of a music hall. Emma fears that someone is out to kill her, following a series of apparent accidents. After the most recent attempt, Emma and her lawyer fake her death, and ask Jessica to come over to England to help investigate. Gaining assistance from a Scotland Yard inspector, Jessica is horrified when, keeping watch on Emma's apartment, they witness Emma's assistant being killed in a deliberate hit-and-run. Now with a murder complicating the matter, Jessica finds there are some who find Emma as an obstacle, and that someone must have known she was still alive when she confesses to having called a close friend to ease their worry before the murder occurred. Guest stars: Sarah Douglas, Olivia Hussey, Barrie Ingham, Glynis Johns, Patrick Macnee, Gregory Paul Martin, Kristoffer Tabori
28	6	"Reflections of the Mind"	Seymour Robbie	Robert E. Swanson	November 3, 1985	60304	26.2/36
Francesca Lodge (Ann Blyth) is facing a nervous breakdown when she begins having nightmares and hears noises coming from a disused bedroom, convincing her that her deceased first husband is haunting her home. Jessica comes to visit to help her out, as her second husband Scott tries to cope with the situation. When he later dies in an automobile accident, Francesca's sanity is soon pushed to breaking point, leaving Jessica convinced someone is trying to frightened her badly. When the lead police officer in the case begins to agree with her, the writer decides to uncover the logical answer behind the events that have tormented her friend. Guest stars: Wings Hauser, Steven Keats, Martin Milner, Ben Murphy, Stacey Nelkin, Esther Rolle
29	7	"A Lady in the Lake"	Walter Grauman	Robert Van Scoyk	November 10, 1985	60307	26.9/38
At a lakeside inn near to Cabot Cove, Jessica checks in for a relaxing weekend after being convinced it will provide her a good amount of research for a new book. Upon her arrival, she finds that two guests staying at the inn, wealthy Howard Crane (Laurence Luckinbill) and his wife Carolyn (Susan Blanchard), are at odds with each other. When taking a walk around the lake, Jessica witnesses Carolyn seemingly fall into the water, apparently pushed in by her husband. Her body is later found along the lake shore. Amos soon suspects the husband of murder but Seth reveals Carolyn was killed by a blow to the head. Jessica soon suspects something is not right and soon finds clues that reveal someone else was involved in the murder. Guest stars: William Christopher, Johnny Crawford, Charles Frank, Lee Meriwether, Lee Purcell, Lauren Tewes
30	8	"Dead Heat"	Peter Crane	J. Miyoko Hensley & Steven Hensley	November 24, 1985	60303	25.0/34
Brutish horse trainer Mike Gann (Clu Gulager) faces trouble from a shady bookkeeper, Jack Bowen (Lonny Chapman), who is willing to reduce Gann's debt if Gann fixes an upcoming horserace. When Bowen's main jockey (Bert Rosario) gets sick, Jessica's niece Tracy Macgill (Linda Grovenor), a rookie, is forced to ride. Shortly after the race concludes, staff at the racecourse are shocked when Bowen is found murdered in the stall for his racehorse, having been killed with an overdose of tranquilizer. Tracy soon faces accusations of murder, prompting Jessica, who came to see her, to investigate what happened, believing Bowen had angered someone deeply enough to want to kill him. Guest stars: Priscilla Barnes, Ramon Bieri, Jack Carter, Carole Cook, Norman Fell, Roy Thinnes
31	9	"Jessica Behind Bars"	John Llewellyn Moxey	Carleton Eastlake	December 1, 1985	60316	26.4/36
While Jessica is filling in for a teacher of a writing class at a women's prison, a prison doctor is found dead by the guards. When a shy prisoner is accused of murdering the doctor with a morphine injection, her fellow prisoners refute the allegations and opt to riot to protect her. Jessica soon finds herself caught up in the chaos, with the prison's warden accused of mistreating the prisoners with poor food and medical treatment. When a local grocer trapped in the prison is later murdered, Jessica finds herself attempting to solve the mystery quickly, before matters can escalate further. Guest stars: Margaret Avery, Adrienne Barbeau, Barbara Baxley, Diana Bellamy, Yvonne De Carlo, Linda Kelsey, Janet MacLachlan, Vera Miles, Susan Oliver, Susan Peretz, Eve Plumb, Mary Woronov
32	10	"Sticks and Stones"	Seymour Robbie	Story by : Jackson Gillis and Linda Shank & Mark Giles; Teleplay by : Linda Shank & Mark Giles	December 15, 1985	60301	26.5/38
As Amos retires and real estate agent Harry Pierce prepares to take over as sheriff, Beverly Gareth is found dead in her bathroom in what seems to be an accident. The next day, a flood of letters containing false accusations are sent out across Cabot Cove, before one of Beverly's friends is found dead in her garden, an apparent suicide. Jessica investigates when she suspects both deaths were murders, and enlists the aid of Amos and a visiting travel writer to determine the motive for both murders. She soon suspects the fake letters may have been sent to prevent a real accusation from being investigated, concerning an arson that took place the previous year. Guest stars: John Astin, Paul Benedict, Joseph Campanella, John David Carson, Marsha Hunt, Evelyn Keyes, Denny Miller, Betsy Palmer, Parker Stevenson, Christopher Stone, Howard Witt
33	11	"Murder Digs Deep"	Philip Leacock	Maryanne Kasica & Michael Scheff	December 29, 1985	60315	24.0/37
Jessica joins Seth in New Mexico as he provides assistance on an archaeological dig site seeking out Native American artifacts, which is being menaced by a mysterious stranger. When a member of the expedition, involved in the hoax, is later found dead after an accidental fall, Seth suspects murder when he discovers the victim actually died from drowned despite being in an arid region. As Jessica investigates the case, she finds that the truth will be hard to uncover, as the expedition's financier is more concerned about tracking down treasure than reporting a murder to the authorities, even if means keeping everyone traped at the dig site. Guest stars: George Grizzard, David Groh, Randolph Mantooth, Stephen Shortridge, Connie Stevens, Robert Vaughn
34	12	"Murder by Appointment Only"	Arthur Allan Seidelman	Jerry Ross	January 5, 1986	60310	26.1/35
While visiting New York City on business, Jessica takes some time off to meet with her nephew Grady after he makes plans to join up with a cosmetics company. In the process, she is surprised to discover that a former student from her teaching days, Elizabeth Gordon, is due to marry the brother of the company's owner. Later that evening when preparing to dine with the couple, both Jessica and Elizabeth's fiance become concerned with her absence, and are soon shocked when they find her dead, having been brutally strangled in her apartment. Jessica soon investigates the matter, convinced the key to the killer's identity is finding out what brand of lipstick was used to deface the victim's portrait that lay within the apartment. Guest stars: Jayne Meadows Allen, Christine Belford, Robert Culp, Robert Desiderio, Ann Dusenberry, Leigh McCloskey, Millie Perkins
35	13	"Trial by Error"	Seymour Robbie	Story by : Scott Shepherd; Teleplay by : Paul Savage	January 12, 1986	60317	28.5/40
Former race driver Mark Lee Reynolds is put on trial for murdering the husband of Becky Anderson. The prosecution argue that Reynolds was having an affair with Becky and plotted to kill her husband, but the defense rebut this, claiming Reynolds was seeking comfort after escaping injury in a traffic accident, which critically injured his wife who later died in hospital. Assigned to jury duty for the case, Jessica is head foreman for the jurors as they debate on their verdict. Convinced that there is more to the case, Jessica convinces the jury to look into the facts, evidence and testimony presented at the trial, and slowly over the course of their discussion, they begin to find themselves uncovering the real truth behind the murder. Guest stars: David Ackroyd, Tony Bill, Virginia Capers, Macdonald Carey, Doran Clark, Jon Cypher, Gene Evans, Tom Ewell, Gary Frank, Arlene Golonka, Alan Hale Jr., Lenore Kasdorf, Vicki Lawrence, Allan Miller, Brock Peters, Richard Sanders, Gregory Walcott
36	14	"Keep the Home Fries Burning"	Peter Crane	Philip Gerson	January 19, 1986	60320	28.1/41
While visiting the newly established Joshua Peabody Inn for breakfast, Jessica, Amos and Seth are shocked when several customers suddenly fall ill after eating, in which one of the affected customers dies before an ambulance can arrive. As a health official investigates the Inn on grounds they caused food poisoning, Seth discovers that those who collapsed are showing symptoms of actual poisoning. Jessica soon suspects someone plotted murder, and believes the key to the mystery is tracking down a pot of strawberry preserves that went missing during the chaotic situation. Guest stars: Sharon Acker, Norman Alden, Orson Bean, Gary Crosby, Anne Francis, William Lucking, John McCook, Donna Pescow, Henry Polic II, Marcia Rodd, Alan Young
37	15	"Powder Keg"	John Llewellyn Moxey	Peter S. Fischer	February 9, 1986	60326	25.9/35
Jessica accompanies her former teaching colleague Ames Caulfield as he visits a friend who runs an inn in a small southern town. On the night of their arrival, Caulfield visits a local bar to check up on his friend's son, Matthew Burns, only to witness Matthew being humiliated by the local town bully Ed Bonner. Later that night, a scream is heard. Bonner found dead outside his home. The local sheriff finds himself protecting Matthew, who is arrested for the murder, but several locals seek to lynch him for the crime. Jessica is forced to step in and uncover what really happened. Guest stars: Pat Corley, Mariclare Costello, Cindy Fisher, Brian Lane Green, Jackie Earle Haley, Dorian Harewood, John Dennis Johnston, Bill McKinney, Jeff Osterhage, Craig Stevens, W.K. Stratton, Stuart Whitman, Larry Wilcox
38	16	"Murder in the Electric Cathedral"	John Llewellyn Moxey	Dick Nelson	February 16, 1986	60312	26.5/38
Carrie McKittrick, a wealthy woman whose fortune was built through the sale of oil, dies from cyanide poisoning while recovering from a heart-attack. Her family is displeased that the head of an evangelist's group, Rev. Willie John Fargo, inherits everything, and soon accuse him of murder. Police soon find a syringe used in the murder, that has Fargo's fingerprints on it. Jessica, who was visiting Carrie before her death, decides to investigate. Not only does she soon prove another will from the family is fake, she soon becomes convinced Fargo has an alibi that prove he is innocent and attempts to uncover it when he will provide it to police himself. Guest stars: Jack Bannon, Barbi Benton, Frank Bonner, Steve Forrest, Judy Geeson, Richard Herd, Art Hindle, Mildred Natwick, Dick Van Patten
39	17	"One Good Bid Deserves a Murder"	Seymour Robbie	J. Miyoko Hensley & Steve Hensley	February 23, 1986	60318	26.4/38
Jessica agrees to help her friend Richard Bennett secure the diary of deceased actress Evangeline, which is up for auction in Boston. She soon finds that there are others wanting the diary, concerned about its contents, but all are shocked when it disappears and Bennett is found dead in another auction lot. Jessica soon comes under suspicion when she finds the diary in a chessboard the auctioneer sold her, who she soon finds stabbed to death. Recruiting help from Harry McGraw (Jerry Orbach), the pair work to find out who was desperate to commit murder to secure the diary. Jessica soon finds the answer when Harry makes a copy, before the original is stolen, allowing her to discover a clue to the killer's identity. Guest stars: Karen Black, Ray Girardin, Nancy Lee Grahn, Hurd Hatfield, Edward Mulhare, Cotter Smith, Vic Tayback
40	18	"If a Body Meet a Body"	Walter Grauman	Steve Stoliar	March 9, 1986	60321	26.4/39
Residents of Cabot Cove attend the funeral of local businessman Henry Vernon, who they had recently invested money with for a major development. When a lover of his claims he is not dead, all are shocked when his casket is accidentally knocked open, revealing the body inside to be that of another man. Jessica and Amos investigate and soon suspect Vernon was embezzling the town's money, when his partner reveals it has gone. But when the mystery corpse disappears and Vernon turns up dead in his lover's home, the pair find themselves attempting to discover where the money went and whether someone else was involved in his embezzlement. Guest stars: Robert Donner, Anne Jeffreys, Audrey Landers, Lori Lethin, Monte Markham, Rex Smith, Carrie Snodgress, Richard Stahl, Robert Sterling
41	19	"Christopher Bundy - Died on Sunday"	Peter Crane	Gerald K. Siegel	March 30, 1986	60311	23.7/39
Jessica is shocked that one of her short stories is due to feature in an adult magazine, and goes with Grady to confront the magazine's owner, Christopher Bundy. They soon learn that the man is unscrupulous, harsh, and not well liked amongst his family, and is due to purchase another magazine owned by a close friend of Jessica's. The following day after their arrival, Jessica and Grady find themselves witness to murder when Bundy is shot dead on the upstairs landing of his home. As his family close ranks, Jessica is forced to question who among them is the killer, especially when she learns from an undercover investigator that Bundy was more immoral than they could have imagined. Guest stars: Bert Convy, Robert Costanzo, Bobby Di Cicco, Robert Hooks, Carol Lawrence, Michelle Nicastro, Alex Rocco, Robert Stack
42	20	"Menace, Anyone?"	Seymour Robbie	Robert B. Sherman	April 6, 1986	60319	25.7/39
Jessica meets with her former student Carol McDermott, an assistant at a local tennis grounds who is helping with the arrangements for a charity tennis tournament. Despite problematic players, Carol is looking forward to marrying her fiancé Brian East, another player in the tournament. However, the night after Brian wins an important match, Carol's car is destroyed in an explosion, killing him when he attempts to drive it. Carol soon begins to suffer from her loss, and police begin to question her sanity when the lead detective on the case is later murdered in her home. Concerned for Carol's safety, Jessica investigates and begins to uncover the truth behind both murders. Guest stars: Dennis Cole, Bryan Cranston, Linda Hamilton, Van Johnson, Kelli Maroney, Doug McKeon, Barry Primus, Betsy Russell, David Spielberg
43	21	"The Perfect Foil"	Walter Grauman	Robert E. Swanson	April 13, 1986	60329	25.8/39
Jessica travels to New Orleans to meet with her cousin Calhoun 'Cal' Fletcher at a relative's request. She soon finds that Cal is attending a Mardi Gras party hosted by the belligerent Johnny Blaze, and is shocked when Blaze is soon found dead in his study. Police suspect Cal was behind the murder, as Blaze ran an illegal gambling den and was suspected of cheating many of those who played with him, including Cal. Jessica is not convinced her cousin is guilty, believing he is being framed, and so decides to question those whom Blaze posed a threat to, soon discovering evidence that hints towards the real killer. Guest stars: Barbara Babcock, Peter Bonerz, Cesare Danova, George DiCenzo, Robert Forster, David Hedison, Lisa Langlois, Penny Singleton, Granville Van Dusen
44	22	"If the Frame Fits"	Paul Lynch	Philip Gerson	May 18, 1986	60331	21.7/36
Jessica travels to Cedar Heights to visit Lloyd Marcus, an old friend of hers who lives in the area. While visiting, she discovers that several people have been robbed and police have found no real clues behind who the culprit is. Soon enough, another robbery is discovered at the home of Lloyd's daughter, though this time murder is involved when his daughter is found dead, leaving her husband facing charges of murder. Jessica decides to investigate when she suspects someone attempted to make the murder look like it was connected to the robbery, and soon discovers a truth that will be hard to accept. Guest stars: Deborah Adair, Christopher Allport, John de Lancie, Cliff Gorman, Gordon Jump, Norman Lloyd, Audrey Meadows, Aubrey Morris, Anne Schedeen

=== Season 3 (1986–87) ===
No. overall	No. in season	Title	Directed by	Written by	Original release date	Rating/share (households)
45	1	"Murder the Big Top: Part 1"	Seymour Robbie	Story by : Peter S. Fischer; Teleplay by : Paul Savage	September 28, 1986	24.6/38
While attending a party for her great-niece (Courteney Cox) before her upcoming marriage, both are shocked when she receives a gift she believes confirms her grandfather, Neil Fletcher (Jackie Cooper) - Jessica's brother-in-law - is still alive. Agreeing to investigate, she soon discovers that Neil is working for a travelling circus owned by the Carmody family, which has just set up outside a small town in Arkansas. Upon her arrival, she discovers the circus has been plagued by accidents. The following day, Hank Sutter (Charles Napier), a despised circus worker, is found dead after being killed with a blow to the head. While the town's mayor is more concerned with his re-election than discovering the facts, Jessica is convinced her brother-in-law is covering for someone and is reluctant to prove his innocence. Guest stars: Martin Balsam, Jackie Cooper, Alex Cord, Ronny Cox, Joey Cramer, Laraine Day, Greg Evigan, Florence Henderson, Gregg Henry, Lee Purcell, Mark Shera, Pamela Susan Shoop, Barbara Stock
46	2	"Death Stalks the Big Top: Part 2"	Seymour Robbie	Story by : Peter S. Fischer; Teleplay by : Paul Savage	October 5, 1986	28.2/41
Jessica continues to prove that her brother-in-law Neil is innocent, as she works to discover who killed Hank Sutter. She soon discovers there may be a link between the murder and the accidents that have plagued the Camordy family circus after it becomes clear someone is sabotaging it. When a rival circus owner is murdered in their motel room, the local sheriff finally refuses to let the mayor interfere in his work any further, allowing Jessica to be able to receive their help in the matter. As Neil is soon freed after it becomes clear he was protecting an innocent person, Jessica soon begins to suspect that Hank was murdered by the same person who was sabotaging the circus and who is now desperately trying to cover up their crime.
47	3	"Unfinished Business"	Walter Grauman	Jackson Gillis	October 12, 1986	25.2/38
Police lieutenant, Barney Kale, finally announces that he will soon retire, after one final case. He soon travels to Juniper Lake, near Cabot Cove, to solve the one murder that has yet to be resolved - that of a close friend who was drowned ten years ago. Upon visiting the cabins where the murder took place, Kale invites several people who were connected to the investigation, including Jessica's friend Seth, to meet with him at the lakes. Concerned, Jessica accompanies her friend, and no sooner do the pair arrive when a guest at the cabins is found dead, having been killed with a shotgun. Jessica finds herself investigating alongside Amos to find out whether the current murder is linked to the one Kale is seeking to resolve. Guest stars: Lloyd Bochner, J.D. Cannon, Don DeFore, Pat Hingle, Hayley Mills, Erin Moran
48	4	"One White Rose for Death"	Peter Crane	Peter S. Fischer	October 19, 1986	24.3/35
Jessica's night out at a concert in Washington D.C. takes a drastic turn when Michael Haggerty (Len Cariou) involves her and her escort into helping with the defection of two East German musicians. Taken to the British embassy, Michael reveals that one of the musicians is in serious danger after the stasi discovered he was helping western intelligence. Before both of them can do anything else a fellow British spy helping Haggarty with the defection is found dead in the embassy's garden. A physician within the embassy grounds confirms the victim was stabbed with a needle that had been coated with poison. Jessica and Haggarty question everyone who was active at the time, but as the planned defection looks set to fall apart, Jessica begins to have an answer behind the motive for the crime. Guest stars: Jenny Agutter, Michael Anderson Jr., Tony Bonner, Eric Braeden, Bernard Fox, John Glover, Maria Mayenzet
49	5	"Corned Beef & Carnage"	John Llewellyn Moxey	Robert Swanson	November 2, 1986	27.7/40
Jessica reunites with her niece Victoria (Genie Francis) in San Francisco, following her marriage, and learns that she recently took up a job with a major advertising company. Victoria is now under immense pressure from her lecherous boss, Larry Kinkaid, to secure an important contract with the owner of a major deli brand. When Kinkaid is later found murdered in his office, Jessica investigates when her niece is suspected by police of the crime. She soon finds out that Kinkaid was well disliked by several others, and finds lies covering up bankruptcy, corporate espionage, and deep resentment against the victim, that leave confusion behind who truly wanted the victim dead. Her only clue soon comes down to a sandwich the victim had ordered. Guest stars: Susan Anton, Warren Berlinger, Jeff Conaway, Peter Haskell, Richard Kline, Bill Macy, David Ogden Stiers, Marcia Wallace
50	6	"Dead Man's Gold"	Seymour Robbie	Robert Van Scoyk	November 9, 1986	25.2/37
David Everett (Leslie Nielsen), a former boyfriend of Jessica's, arrives in Cabot Cove to work with a group seeking out 18th century treasure that was lost off the coast. Jessica learns that the group are involved in a tontine regarding the treasure, which allows each member to have a bigger share of the reward if one of them dies. She soon becomes concerned behind the arrangements when one of the group is nearly killed in a serious accident, but then the matter turns grim when another member is murdered in what appears to be a hit-and-run. As Everett faces suspicion, after he is found to be deep in debt, Seth soon discovers the victim died via a different method. Jessica eventually becomes convinced that treasure may not be the motive behind the murder. Guest stars: Grant Goodeve, Robert Hogan, Wendy Kilbourne, John Laughlin, Sean McClory, Julia Montgomery, J. Eddie Peck
51	7	"Deadline for Murder"	Seymour Robbie	Story by : John Kennedy, Michael McGough & Tom B. Sawyer; Teleplay by : Tom B. Sawyer	November 16, 1986	25.8/37
After a reporter, Haskell Drake, suffers a heart attack after accusing a newspaper tycoon, Lamar Bennett, of publishing a slanderous story against Jessica, the mystery writer decides to confront him herself. She soon learns that the tycoon is disliked by many who work for him and the former owner of the newspaper he took over. When Bennett dies during a drinks party all of a sudden, police soon confirm her suspicions that he died form an induced cerebral hemorrhage caused by a combination of alcohol and a specific drug. Jessica soon decides to investigate the matter, with help from Drake while in hospital, and discovers the key involves learning when Bennett was given the drug that eventually killed him. Guest stars: Katherine Cannon, Gretchen Corbett, Harry Guardino, Tim O'Connor, Ken Olin, Peter Mark Richman, Eugene Roche, William Smith, Glynn Turman, Sydney Walsh
52	8	"Magnum on Ice"	Peter Crane	Robert E. Swanson	November 23, 1986	28.3/39
Private investigator Thomas Magnum (Tom Selleck) is arrested by police for killing a man he claims was hired to target one of the guests from a party he attended. Jessica finds herself forced to investigate his claims, after witnessing Magnum pursue the victim, and soon finds evidence proving his story, though is surprised when police found two casings that match the caliber of his own gun. Convinced there is more to the matter, Jessica meets with those connected to the case, but is soon shocked when a possible suspect is later found dead at his home and Magnum now wanted for murder. Believing he is innocent, Jessica suspects someone is lying, and that Magnum is being framed for their crimes. Guest stars: Ramon Bieri, Stephanie Faracy, John Hillerman, Kwan Hi Lim, Dorothy Loudon, Jared Martin, John McMartin, Andrew Prine, Jessica Walter Note: This episode concludes a crossover event that begins on Magnum, P.I. season 7 episode 9.
53	9	"Obituary for a Dead Anchor"	Walter Grauman	Story by : Bob Shayne; Teleplay by : Robert Van Scoyk	December 7, 1986	24.8/36
TV personality Kevin Keats (Chad Everett) is forced to drop an investigation against an art collector suspected of drug dealing, in order to cover a piece in Cabot Cove. Unknown to many, Keats is actually secretly meeting a witness, and using the assignment to cover his actions. However, when the boat he rents out for the plan is blown up, shortly after he departs, many fear him dead. As his colleagues and the press descend on the town, it soon transpires that Keats is still alive, and that it was his program's producer, Doug Helman, who was killed. Amos soon believes Keats is guilty, as the producer had been making plans to change his program, but Jessica is not so sure, suspecting someone else was behind the explosion. Guest stars: Abby Dalton, Robert Hogan, Robert Lipton, Kathleen Lloyd, Robert Pine, Rex Robbins, Mark Stevens
54	10	"Stage Struck"	John Astin	Philip Gerson	December 14, 1986	24.2/36
Jessica attends the revival of a play she performed in with her late husband, in which she became friends with the two leading stars, Julian Lord and Maggie Tarrow, who are due to perform in it once again. When Tarrow is frightened out of her part, her understudy Barbara Bennington takes over her role. Bennington is much delighted for this, even though others are not, but soon her debut performance ends in tragedy when she dies on stage during the next performance, after unknowingly ingesting cyanide. Jessica is forced to help the local chief of police, who is performing in the play, to investigate the matter, and soon discovers the motive is linked to a dark secret connected with one of the cast. Guest stars: Shea Farrell, Bob Hastings, Don Most, Edward Mulhare, Christopher Norris, Dan O'Herlihy, Eleanor Parker, John Pleshette, John Schuck, Ann Turkel
55	11	"Night of the Headless Horseman"	Walter Grauman	R. Barker Price	January 4, 1987	27.9/40
Jessica meets up with Dorian Beecher, a friend who teaches at a private school in the town of Wenton, Vermont. Upon her arrival, she discovers that Dorian dislikes the school's obnoxious riding instructor, Nate Findley, for ridiculing him in public. The night after fighting with him in a pub, Dorian is arrested for murdering Nate after he is found beheaded outside the school. Jessica is not convinced he is guilty as he cannot recall much about his movements that night, and so investigates the murder herself. As she seeks out clues, she finds that Nate had other enemies besides Dorian, and slowly discovers secret societies and embezzlement in her investigation. Guest stars: Thom Bray, Judy Landers, Hope Lange, Doug McClure, Charles Siebert, Guy Stockwell, Fritz Weaver, Barry Williams
56	12	"The Corpse Flew First Class"	Walter Grauman	Donald Ross	January 18, 1987	27.7/39
On a flight to London, Jessica is shocked when the bodyguard of an actress on the plane is found dead and a $2 million necklace he was protecting has gone missing. Working alongside a British police detective travelling on the flight, she soon discovers that a flight attendant was framed for the murder and was in possession of a replica of the necklace. The pair soon have to check among the passengers, when one of the passengers eventually admits to the necklace's theft and claims responsibility for the murder. Jessica soon discovers something is wrong, and realizes that two crimes took place, in which each culprit has been effectively comprised by the other's plan. Guest stars: Mary Jo Catlett, Robin Dearden, Pat Harrington Jr., David Hemmings, Kate Mulgrew, Gene Nelson, Andrew Parks, John S. Ragin, Chris Robinson, James Shigeta, Robert Walker Jr.
57	13	"Crossed Up"	David Hemmings	Steven Long Mitchell & Craig W. Van Sickle	February 1, 1987	24.9/35
While Jessica finds herself confined to her bed at home by Seth due to her bad back, she inadvertently is connected to another phone conversation during a bad storm, and overhears a plot for murder by one of the callers. Neither Seth nor her nephew Grady, helping her out during her convalescence, believe her story, until a lumber millionaire is found shot dead in his home after apparently being robbed. Grady agrees to help Jessica investigate the matter as Amos soon learns the truth behind the millionaire's death, and both soon determine who amongst the victim's family would want him dead. But then another dead complicates matters when a former employee of the victim is found dead after apparently falling down stairs in outside of a house. Guest stars: Colleen Camp, Tony Dow, Stephanie Dunnam, Gisele Mackenzie, Sandy McPeak
58	14	"Murder in a Minor Key"	Nick Havinga	Story by : Arthur Marks; Teleplay by : Gerald K. Siege and Peter S. Fischer	February 8, 1987	26.6/39
Jessica narrates a tale about the investigation of a law student, Chad Singer (Shaun Cassidy), who was inspired by her own work. The story begins with Chad's friend Michael Prentice, a music student, accusing his arrogant professor of plagiarizing his own work. When his professor is later murdered, Michael is arrested after he was found snooping around the victim's office. Chad decides to prove his friend's innocence, and with the help of a fellow student, soon learns there were other who hated the victim. When it becomes clear that the key to solving the murder involves Michael's work, Chad soon sets up an elaborate trap for the killer. Guest stars: René Auberjonois, Karen Grassle, George Grizzard, Tom Hallick, Jennifer Holmes, Scott Jacoby, Dinah Manoff, Parker Stevenson
59	15	"The Bottom Line Is Murder"	Anthony Shaw	Steven Long Mitchell & Craig W. Van Sickle	February 15, 1987	26.4/38
In Denver, Jessica meets with her friend Steve Honig, who is the producer for a local consumer program. Its host, the arrogant and ruthless TV presenter Kenneth Chambers, is well disliked by several members of staff, including Honig, as well as the owner of a toy company he recently claimed was producing poor quality products. When Chambers is found dead by the janitor after his recent episode, shot twice in the head, Honig is accused of the murder when the weapon is found in his car. Jessica investigates to prove he was framed, but while she learns that many benefitted from the victim's death, she begins to realizes that Kenneth was not the intended target of the killer. Guest stars: Adrienne Barbeau, Judith Chapman, Barry Corbin, Pat Klous, Robert F. Lyons, Rod McCary, Joe Santos, Morgan Stevens, George Takei
60	16	"Death Takes a Dive"	Seymour Robbie	Peter S. Fischer	February 22, 1987	24.9/35
Harry McGraw (Jerry Orbach) finds himself becoming the manager of a boxer who he hopes will win his first big fight. However, he soon argues with Wade Talmadge (Adam West), the manager of the opponent, regarding the nature of the match. When Talmadge is later found murdered, Harry is arrested when his gun is linked to the crime. Jessica, who reluctantly found herself agreeing to provide financial assistance for his situation, not only takes over managing his boxer, but investigates who wanted the victim dead. In trying to prove Harry innocent, she soon learns that Talmadge was truly dishonest in and out of the sport of boxing. Guest stars: John Amos, Ernest Borgnine, LeVar Burton, Bradford Dillman, Ray Girardin, Caren Kaye, Michael McGrady, Lynne Moody, Harold Sylvester
61	17	"Simon Says, Color Me Dead"	Kevin G. Cremin	Robert E. Swanson	March 1, 1987	30.4/43
When famous artist Simon Thane spends the summer in Cabot Cove, Jessica attends a dinner party hosted by him alongside his wife, art dealer, and his lawyer and their wife. The day after announcing plans for a second honeymoon, Thane is found stabbed to death and a new painting he was working on missing. Amos soon arrests Thane's housekeeper for the crime, as she was struggling financially, but Jessica is not convinced. She soon suspects the killer may have been one of the guests at the party, and is convinced that the motive may have something to do with the subject of his missing work. Guest stars: Diane Baker, Foster Brooks, Ann Dusenberry, Leonard Frey, Tess Harper, Steve Inwood, Dick Sargent
62	18	"No Laughing Murder"	Walter Grauman	Tom B. Sawyer	March 15, 1987	24.8/36
Jessica is invited to a dinner hosted by two estranged comedians who fell out years ago over a dispute about royalties, and whose children are due to be married. Their feud soon spills over into their dinner conversation between the attendees, as they continue to argue over the royalties. Soon afterwards, one of the pair is assaulted, before one of the guests, talent agent Phil Rinker, is found dead after seemingly hanging himself. Jessica soon works to end the feud between the comedians, as she helps a rookie police officer tackle his first case, and believes that Rinker may have been killed because he had begun to suspect something was not right regarding the subject of the feud. Guest stars: George Clooney, Pat Crowley, George Furth, Buddy Hackett, Arte Johnson, Steve Lawrence, Sheree North, Alice Nunn
63	19	"No Accounting for Murder"	Peter Crane	Gerald K. Siegel	March 22, 1987	26.2/39
Grady earns himself a new job in New York, serving as an accountant for a major investment firm, much to Jessica's delight. However, when he returns to his office one night, he is shocked to find his boss, Ralph Whitman, murdered after a heated meeting with an IRS agent. Jessica finds herself asked by the lead detective in the case, Lt. Timothy Hanratty, to help in the matter, as the investigation soon opens up a can of suspects who had their own reasons for potentially wanting harm on Whitman. The pair soon find there are plenty of lies to untangle, but Jessica soon finds a key clue will be in finding a hidden witness believed to be in hiding within the firm's building. Guest stars: Dorothy Lamour, Geoffrey Lewis, Barney Martin, Patty McCormack, James Noble, Michael Tolan, Kate Vernon
64	20	"The Cemetery Vote"	Seymour Robbie	Robert Van Scoyk	April 5, 1987	24.9/37
Jessica provides emotional support for Linda Stevens, after her husband, the mayor of the town of Comstock, Idaho, is killed in a car crash in the run-up to a major election. However, Linda's father-in-law, Harry Stevens, is convinced his son was murdered as he was seeking to clamp down on illegal activity in the town and was distrusting of the local sheriff. When Harry is murdered when seeking evidence to prove his case, Jessica works alongside a state police detective to get to the bottom of the matter. The investigation soon reveals that the murders may be connected to raids on a suspected illegal gambling den, whose owner is attempting to influence the election. Guest stars: Ellen Bry, Joseph Campanella, Bruce Davison, Ed Lauter, John McLiam, Mitchell Ryan, Charlene Tilton, Marie Windsor, Jeff Yagher
65	21	"The Days Dwindle Down"	Michael Lynch	Philip Gerson	April 19, 1987	21.2/38
Sam Wilson is paroled after serving 30 years in prison for murder, but his wife believes he is innocent. She soon urges Jessica to investigate the crime and discover what truly occurred, leading her to work alongside Wilson's son Rod, a local cop. While the original investigation claimed Wilson was involved after taking $10,000 from the victim, Jessica finds that the people who were involved in the matter are unwilling to reveal any further details. When someone attempts to shoot Jessica, she soon suspects someone is eager to conceal the truth, prompting her to dig deeper into the matter. Guest stars: Richard Beymer, June Havoc, Art Hindle, Jeffrey Lynn, Harry Morgan, Martha Scott, Susan Strasberg, Gloria Stuart Note: This episode is a partial sequel/reinterpretation of the 1949 film Strange Bargain, although with its ending changed to reflect the episode's plot. Footage from the film was used in the episode, with several of the main actors reprising their role for the plot.
66	22	"Murder, She Spoke"	Anthony Shaw	Si Rose	May 10, 1987	20.4/37
At Red River Studios, Jessica is recording an audio book for the blind during a late-night session, when the lights suddenly go out during a blackout. A short time after they come back on, the studio's director, Randy Witworth, is found dying after being stabbed in the back. The police soon suspect the studio's blind producer, Greg Dalton, committed the crime as revenge for the accident that Witworth caused, resulting in Dalton's blindness. However, Jessica is convinced that Dalton is innocent, and decides to investigate further, finding others had their own reasons for potentially wanting Witworth dead. Guest stars: William Atherton, G.W. Bailey, Michael Callan, Michael Cole, Charlie Daniels, Jonna Lee, Fredric Lehne, Wendy Phillips, Constance Towers, Patrick Wayne

=== Season 4 (1987–88) ===
No. overall	No. in season	Title	Directed by	Written by	Original release date	Rating/share (households)
67	1	"A Fashionable Way to Die"	Nick Havinga	Donald Ross	September 20, 1987	18.7/29
Jessica heads to Paris to see her friend Eva Taylor, a fashion designer who is about to have her first major fashion show. Behind the scenes, however, Eva is facing trouble from loan shark Max Soury, who now has control on half her fashion business in exchange for the money she needed to deal with financial problems. After the fashion show has concluded, Soury is found dead in his hotel room after being shot, and Eva becomes the prime suspect in the murder. Jessica is not convinced by the police's assumption, and soon discovers that the victim was an adulterer and an extortionist, but discovers the key to the mystery is the statement of two maids who each heard the shot at different intervals. Guest stars: Lee Bergere, Danielle Brisebois, Taina Elg, Juliet Prowse, Barbara Rush, Fritz Weaver
68	2	"When Thieves Fall Out"	Seymour Robbie	Arthur David Weingarten	September 27, 1987	20.4/32
Andrew Durbin (John Glover) returns to Cabot Cove, seeking to prove his innocence after spending 20 years in prison for murder. In meeting Jessica, he claims that he had hitched a ride with the victim, a businessman, who was soon run off the road by another driver. Jessica is concerned about what Durbin plans to do. Her concerns are soon justified when a local car dealer with whom Durbin was meeting is found murdered. Deciding to uncover what really happened, Jessica learns the businessman was in possession of $100,000 in bearer bonds that have never been found, and that their murder occurred on the same night as a local high school's prom dance, providing a few leads towards finding the real killer in both murders. Guest stars: Michael Lembeck, Kenneth McMillan, Caitlin O'Heaney, John Bennett Perry, Dack Rambo, Shelley Smith
69	3	"Witness for the Defense"	Seymour Robbie	Robert E. Swanson	October 4, 1987	22.8/34
Jessica receives a court summons to travel to Quebec to testify on behalf of a writer friend, Jim Harlan (Christopher Allport), who is accused of murdering his grasping and vicious estranged wife (Marilyn Hassett). Jessica learns Harlan had been finding marriage so difficult that he was beginning to contemplate divorce. The police investigation allows Jessica to learn that the victim was bludgeoned to death in the couple's country home, shortly before it was burnt down in a fire. Jessica soon attempts to investigate the matter, convinced her friend is innocent, despite the attorney willing to do anything to discredit her findings. Guest stars: Richard Cox, Stefan Gierasch, Simon Jones, Dianne Kay, Patrick McGoohan, Juliet Mills, Claire Trevor
70	4	"Old Habits Die Hard"	John Llewellyn Moxey	Chris Manheim	October 11, 1987	23.3/36
At a convent run by Reverend Mother Claire (Jane Powell), an old friend of Jessica with whom the latter is visiting, the nuns are shocked when one of their members, Sister Emily (Evelyn Keyes), is found dead in what looks to have been suicide. While the police decide to close the case, much to the satisfaction of the priest who serves the convent, Claire is convinced something is wrong. Jessica soon discovers someone murdered the nun and made it look like suicide, as Emily had been seeking information requested by a private detective. In doing so, Jessica attempts to find out if there is another way into the convent after the priest makes clear that all the known entry points are locked tight every night. And, of course, there is. Guest stars: Eileen Brennan, Cindy Fisher, Clu Gulager, Mark Keyloun, Ed Nelson, Scott Paulin, Robert Prosky, Audrey Totter
71	5	"The Way to Dusty Death"	Nick Havinga	Philip Gerson	October 25, 1987	17.7/25
Tyrannical tycoon Duncan Barnett (Cornel Wilde) invites his top executives from the company board, including Jessica, to a dinner party at his stately home, where he crushes rumours that his company will be taken over or that he will soon resign as chairman of the board. The day after his party, Barnett is found dead in his hot tub, with the police ruling that he died from accidental electrocution from his bathroom's TV. Jessica is not convinced, suspecting murder due to some of his heart medication being missing along with a glass that contained brandy, and soon discovers that there was deep resentment by many towards the deceased. Guest stars: Joanna Barnes, Richard Beymer, Lynn Carlin, Nancy Dussault, Jenilee Harrison, Richard Jaeckel, Andrea Marcovicci, Sandy McPeak, Joanna Pettet, Lawrence Pressman, Ray Walston
72	6	"It Runs in the Family"	Walter Grauman	Peter S. Fischer	November 1, 1987	21.9/32
Emma McGill, Jessica's identical British cousin, is shocked when she finds herself reuniting with Geoffrey Constable (Richard Johnson), a wartime love who is now a viscount. She is further surprised when he reveals that he plans to leave her a house in his will, much to his family's displeasure. The pair go on a picnic, and Constable dies, suddenly, while proposing to her. The police inspector recognizes that Constable was poisoned. Despite the family's attitude, he does not suspect Emma. She helps him with the investigation—as her cousin Jessica would—starting by raising doubts about the recent death of Constable's father. (Emma sings, at Geoffrey's request, “How'd You Like to Spoon With Me?”, a song that Angela Lansbury performed in the 1946 film Till the Clouds Roll By.) Guest stars: Mark Lindsay Chapman, Christopher Hewett, Jane Leeves, Rosemary Murphy, Anthony Newley, Carolyn Seymour, John Standing
73	7	"If It's Thursday, It Must Be Beverly"	Peter Crane	Wendy Graf & Lisa Storsky	November 8, 1987	22.3/34
Amos recruits Jonathan Martin (Rick Lenz) as his latest deputy for the night shift, as Jessica's friends at the local beauty salon in Cabot Cove make preparations to purchase their usual lottery tickets. The night after their purchase, Jonathan's wife Audrey (Antoinette Bower) is found dead, having been shot with the deputy's spare gun. Both Amos and Jessica discount suicide and suspect murder after an examination of the scene, making the new deputy the prime suspect, especially when they learn he has been "assisting" various older women across town who discreetly fancy him including Beverly (Dody Goodman) for whom the episode is named. However, Jessica, who almost joins the other ladies' ranks after Jonathan gives her a well-needed and expert back massage, soon discovers that something is being overlooked which proves critical in identifying the real killer. Guest stars: Julie Adams, Gloria DeHaven, Ray Girardin, Kathryn Grayson, Ruth Roman
74	8	"Steal Me a Story"	John Llewellyn Moxey	Peter S. Fischer	November 15, 1987	20.8/31
While visiting Hollywood, Jessica is horrified when a young writer for a TV mystery series comes forward with news that its director is planning to the plot from one of her novels for an upcoming episode. She soon attempts to speak with the director's boss, TV producer Sid Sharkey, about the situation. Shortly after she leaves, police find themselves investigating a suspicious explosion that kills Sharkey in his office. Securing a position as a writer on the program, Jessica uses her position to investigate what happened and discovers that certain members of the production staff and cast disliked the producer considerably, and begins to suspect Sharkey had a stranglehold over one of them. Guest stars: Vincent Baggetta, Bradford Dillman, Fionnula Flanagan, Lenore Kasdorf, Yaphet Kotto, Doug McClure, Kim Miyori, Gail Strickland
75	9	"Trouble in Eden"	Nick Havinga	Story by : John D.F. Black; Teleplay by : John D.F. Black & Paul Savage	November 22, 1987	22.8/33
Visiting her friend Mary Rose (Joan Caulfield) in New York City, Jessica is stunned when a driver deliberately attempts to run her down before dying in a crash seconds later. Mary believes the incident is connected to her sister Charlotte's death, prompting Jessica to agree to visit the hotel she ran in Oregon, accompanied by Mary's lawyer. While both are stunned to discover the type of hotel Charlotte had run, they soon learn from the maid that her death may not have been natural, as her papers, including her will and money, went missing afterwards. Jessica does her best to discover the truth, and finds herself drawn to four men whom Charlotte had been secretly seeing in her room. Guest stars: Macdonald Carey, Thom Christopher, Tom Fitzsimmons, Betty Garrett, Roy Thinnes, Mills Watson, Stuart Whitman
76	10	"Indian Giver"	Walter Grauman	Gerald K. Siegel	November 29, 1987	23.4/33
George Longbow, a Native American descended from a tribe who lived in the area of Cabot Cove, arrives in town with claims that he legally owns every building per an agreement made with the British centuries ago. His revelations cause heightened tensions and anger amongst the town's residents as the document he produces is examined, especially when he makes plans to claim rent from each of them. When a local man is later found murdered in the town hall, everyone is convinced that George is guilty, but Amos and Jessica are soon concerned that people are jumping to conclusions, especially when the victim's home life comes into question. Guest stars: Theodore Bikel, Heidi Bohay, Lonny Chapman, Jack Colvin, Gary Lockwood, Jennifer Salt, Charles Siebert, Bernard White
77	11	"Doom With a View"	Walter Grauman	Kenneth Alan Berg	December 13, 1987	21.9/32
As his apartment is undergoing fumigation, Grady (Michael Horton) secures a room for Jessica and himself at a prestigious New York hotel, owned by his college fraternity brother Garrett Harper (John Callahan) and Harper's much older wife, Cornelia (Janet Leigh). During their stay, Grady is surprised to discover his high school crush, Sandra Clemons, is also a guest in the hotel, so is shocked when he later finds her murdered in her room. Jessica is not convinced when police assume he is guilty, although Harper is forcing him to comply with several odd requests. Investigating the case herself, Jessica soon learns that Sandra could ill-afford to stay at the hotel, prompting her to question how she could afford the price. Guest stars: Robert Desiderio, Jennifer Holmes, Monte Markham, Macon McCalman, Charlotte Rae, Juli Reding
78	12	"Who Threw the Barbitals in Mrs. Fletcher's Chowder?"	John Llewellyn Moxey	Robert Van Scoyk	January 3, 1988	25.2/35
Amos is surprised when his sister Winnie (Anne Meara) turns up in Cabot Cove, revealing she had to get away from her abusive husband, Elmo Banner. As Seth and Winnie bond mutually during her visit, Amos soon finds himself taking in Banner, along with his family, into his home, when they come along looking for her. Jessica decides to calm matters down with a dinner at her home, but shortly after everyone turns up for it, most of her guests pass out after eating her clam chowder. Only Banner fails to regain consciousness, and Seth soon pronounces him dead at hospital. Amos and Jessica soon investigate after it transpires someone spiked the chowder with barbitals, but find Banner was murdered as he was given a fatal overdose of the drug. Guest stars: Colleen Camp, Henry Gibson, Geoffrey Lewis, Barbara Rhoades, Donnelly Rhodes, Guy Stockwell
79	13	"Harbinger of Death"	Anthony Shaw	R. Barker Price	January 24, 1988	22.3/32
Jessica visits an astrophysics institution, where her niece Carrie Palmer resides alongside her husband Leonard, an astronomy researcher. Shortly after arriving, she discovers that the marriage between the pair has problems, and that Leonard dislikes his employers trying to secure an important defense contract. The night after an important party, the assistant of a gossip columnist is murdered at the pair's holiday residence, and Leonard is accused of the crime on the belief that the victim was having an affair with Carrie. Jessica is unconvinced that this is the case, and gains access to the investigation to find out the truth, if it means offering to ghost-write the leads detective's draft manuscript. Guest stars: George DiCenzo, Steven Ford, Robin Gammell, Karen Grassle, Dean Jones, Kate McNeil, Marcia Rodd, Jeffrey Tambor
80	14	"Curse of the Daanav"	Walter Grauman	Chris Manheim	February 7, 1988	21.5/31
Jessica and Seth travel to Maryland to attend a polo-match hosted by Seth's brother, Richard Hazlitt (Richard Bradford), who has been estranged from Seth for a long time. During a party at his home, Richard gives his new, young wife, Alice (Jane Windsor), a precious jewel to celebrate their marriage, only for her to nearly be suffocated when she heads to the garage on the couple's estate to retrieve a present. The following morning, after reconciling with him, Seth is shocked to find Richard has been murdered, after he was found in a locked room. While there are stories his death is link to a curse on the jewel, Jessica is not convinced by them nor that a phony government agent is the killer. She sets herself the task of discovering how the murder was committed. Guest stars: Jane Badler, Douglas Barr, Kabir Bedi, Larry Linville, Clive Revill
81	15	"Mourning Among the Wisterias"	Walter Grauman	Scott Anderson	February 14, 1988	19.5/29
Playwright Eugene McClenden (Barry Nelson) invites his friend Jessica over to his home in Savannah, Georgia, where he claims he is slowly dying and wants her to help him complete his new play. Agreeing to do so, she finds his family is visiting him, alongside his unscrupulous lawyer Jonathan Keeler. That night, a gunshot rings out and Eugene is found holding a gun, looking over the body of Keeler. Police soon investigate the matter, with Jessica learning that the victim had been a source of problems for several of the family. But she soon becomes convinced he may have been investigating Eugene's condition, which might have been the motive for his murder. Guest stars: René Auberjonois, Penny Fuller, Frank Gorshin, Matt McCoy, Lois Nettleton, Linda Purl, Elliott Reid, Beah Richards
82	16	"Murder Through the Looking Glass"	Seymour Robbie	Robert Van Scoyk	February 21, 1988	19.1/27
While in Connecticut for a convention, Jessica finds herself witnessing a car crash. The driver soon climbs out, dying from a heart attack, and confesses to being a hitman who recently killed someone a short while ago. A wall of secrecy behind the matter soon leads to her discovering that the hitman's victim was the leader of a group of American federal agents currently running a safe house to protect a foreign dignitary. Jessica soon learns that there is an internal investigation against the group, and that the dead agent was likely trying to root out a mole who must have discovered they were about to be exposed, prompting her to dig deeper into the matter to uncover the truth. Guest stars: Cliff De Young, Laurence Luckinbill, Robert Reed, Mark Shera, Dan Shor, Karen Valentine
83	17	"A Very Good Year for Murder"	Walter Grauman	Peter S. Fischer	February 28, 1988	19.7/29
Jessica attends the 75th anniversary of vineyard run by Salvatore Gambini (Eli Wallach), who is hoping his family will take over its operations when he is gone. She soon learns there are deep tensions amongst Salvatore's family, and growing issues from a buyer persistently trying to buy the vineyard. When one of the family is nearly killed in an accident, Jessica is horrified when, the following day, Salvatore's granddaughter's boyfriend is found dead, having been poisoned. In investigating the situation, she discovers the victim was not all they appear to be, and makes a startling conclusion about who the killer is and the motive for the crime. Guest stars: Kristian Alfonso, Ina Balin, Bibi Besch, Grant Goodeve, John Saxon, Billy Zane
84	18	"Benedict Arnold Slipped Here"	Seymour Robbie	Story by : Wendy Graf & Lisa Storsky; Teleplay by : Robert Van Scoyk	March 13, 1988	21.2/32
After an elderly resident in Cabot Cove dies, Jessica finds herself becoming the executor of her will. Following her funeral, Jessica finds there are several individuals eager to profit from the dead woman's house and its contents, including local antique dealer Benny Tibbles and his relatives, the woman's grand-niece, and her personal housekeeper. When Jessica visits the property with Seth to make an inventory of the contents, both are shocked to find Tibbles dead in the study. The pair question who wanted him dead, and it soon becomes clear that there might have been treasure hidden in the house that belonged to Benedict Arnold, which Jessica believes might be key to solving the murder. Guest stars: Brian Bedford, Barbara Cason, David Clennon, Shea Farrell, Lois Foraker, Dick O'Neill
85	19	"Just Another Fish Story"	Walter Grauman	Philip Gerson	March 27, 1988	22.3/35
Grady has become engaged with Donna Mayberry, an accountant for a restaurant in New York that Jessica recently invested in. Agreeing to join them to celebrate the occasion, the pair are not delighted with the treatment they get from maitre d' Chaz Crewe, who is certainly not liked by others in the restaurant. The following day, Jessica is shocked when police bring her, Grady and Donna back to the restaurant, revealing that Crewe was found murdered in the freezer. With their weekend plans in jeopardy, Jessica decides to investigate what happened, soon learning that Crewe was cheating his employers and partners out of cash and food, and attempts to unravel his web of deceit. Guest stars: Sonny Bono, Jack Carter, Norman Fell, Dick Gautier, Valerie Landsburg, Brenda Vaccaro
86	20	"Showdown in Saskatchewan"	Vincent McEveety	Dick Nelson	April 10, 1988	21.8/34
After Jill Morton runs away to Canada to be with a rodeo cowboy, her mother requests that Jessica follow after her. When she arrives, she finds that Jill appears happy helping one out, but discovers that the rodeo's doctor, Doc Schaeffer, is an unpleasant man with some of the others. The night after arriving, a fire breaks out in his mobile home that nearly kills a rodeo worker resting inside from a broken leg. However, the smoke suffocates Schaeffer, prompting an inspector of the RCMP to suspect murder. Jessica decides to investigate, learning that despite the doctor's behaviour, he may have been killed because he was looking into something that the killer wished to cover up. Guest stars: Rosanna DeSoto, Terry Kiser, Lance LeGault, Paul Le Mat, Kristy McNichol, Larry Wilcox, Cassie Yates
87	21	"Deadpan"	E.W. Swackhamer	Story by : Arthur Weingarten; Teleplay by : Maryanne Kasica & Michael Scheff	May 1, 1988	20.8/33
A plot from one of Jessica's novels is adapted for a Broadway stage show, but both she and the play's writer, Walter Knapf, are not impressed by the many changes that the producer has made to the original script. Critics Danny O'Mara and Elliot Easterbrook soon give their own opinion on the adaptation, although the latter is shocked when his rival gives a glowing review of the play that ends with an insult against him. Shortly after storming out of the opening night party, Easterbrook (Dean Stockwell) is arrested for shooting dead O'Hara in his apartment. Jessica soon discovers someone faked the victim's review to disguise the time of death, and attempts to find out who was responsible when Walter is later suspected of the crime. Guest stars: Lloyd Bochner, Miles Chapin, Carole Cook, Marilyn Hassett, Rich Little, Christopher Norris, Eugene Roche
88	22	"The Body Politic"	Anthony Shaw	Donald Ross	May 8, 1988	18.3/32
Senatorial candidate Kathleen Lane (Shirley Jones) faces a difficult time in the run-up to the primaries, after a TV talk show host claims she is having an affair with her campaign manager Bud Johnson. To assist her friend, Jessica joins her campaign team and discovers a rival candidate is willing to do anything to discredit Kathleen. Tragedy soon strikes when Kathleen is horrified to find Johnson dead in what appears to have been suicide. However, the police suspect murder, leaving Jessica to help her friend by uncovering the truth, which leads her to discover that the victim had been conducting investigations against someone with Kathleen's campaign team. Guest stars: Eddie Albert, Robert Fuller, George Grizzard, Harrison Page, Daphne Maxwell Reid

=== Season 5 (1988–89) ===
No. overall	No. in season	Title	Directed by	Written by	Original release date	U.S. viewers (millions)	Rating/share (households)
89	1	"J.B. as in Jailbird"	Anthony Shaw	Robert E. Swanson	October 23, 1988	28.4	20.1/30
Jessica is shocked when British agent Michael Haggerty (Len Cariou) comes back into her life, shortly before she is arrested for the death of a foreign agent. Enlisting Grady's help, Michael reveals that the real killer was an assassin who was being hunted down by MI6, and that certain colleagues of his believe he had connections to the culprit. With Jessica left having to stay behind bars for her own safety, she is left relying on Michael and Grady to provide her with the facts before another killing takes place, and all three soon suspect the murder is directly linked to an unknown payment that the assassin was due to receive. Guest stars: Maureen Arthur, Sam Behrens, Michael Callan, Maxwell Caulfield, John Rhys-Davies, Leslie Easterbrook, Stephen Macht, Ron O'Neal, Joseph Ruskin
90	2	"A Little Night Work"	Walter Grauman	Peter S. Fischer	October 30, 1988	27.7	19.5/29
With her current publisher retiring, Jessica heads to New York where she finds herself courted by the charming Dennis Stanton (Keith Michell), unaware he is a British jewel thief planning to rob a valuable necklace from the wife of publisher Axel Weingard. The following day, Jessica is surprised when Weingard is found dead after being strangled, and that a local waiter who asked her advice on writing has been arrested after a disagreement with the victim. Believing he is innocent, Jessica investigates the murder in more detail, discovering that Weingard had several enemies, and soon must convince Stanton to come clean to the police when it transpires he holds the key to solving the case. Guest stars: John Dye, Jamie Farr, Leann Hunley, Conrad Janis, Rick Jason, Joe Santos
91	3	"Mr. Penroy's Vacation"	Anthony Shaw	Robert Swanson	November 6, 1988	31.2	21.4/31
A month after Amos' retirement, Cabot Cove's new sheriff, Mort Metzger (Ron Masak), is faced with a difficult case when the body of Morris Penroy (Henry Jones) is found in the flowerbed of the Appletree sisters. Penroy had been a resident in their home for a year, but Metzger cannot understand why he was buried after suffering a heart attack. Several odd characters soon turn up in town, including a priest who later turns up dead in the Appletree sisters' garden, having being stabbed. Jessica soon decides to help out Metzger, and discovers that the case may be connected to a major robbery that occurred in Boston a while ago, which involved $5 million being stolen from a company for which Penroy had worked. Guest stars: Norman Alden, Candice Azzara, Don Calfa, Tim Choate, Joan Leslie, Teresa Wright
92	4	"Snow White, Blood Red"	Vincent McEveety	Peter S. Fischer	November 13, 1988	23.7	16.5/23
At a ski lodge, Jessica is among several guests who become trapped in the area by a snow blizzard, including a major skiing team. As everyone tries their best to cope with the situation, the womanizing Gunnar Tilstrom, the star member of the skiing team, is murdered on the stormy slopes. The weapon was a crossbow from the lodge that is now missing. Jessica finds herself aided by a police detective trapped alongside her, as they investigate who wanted Tilstrom dead, especially as he was not well liked by others in his team. The case soon becomes complicated when two more deaths occur, but Jessica soon suspects someone is lying when she discovers some crucial information concerning Tilstrom. Guest stars: Ronnie Claire Edwards, Eric Allan Kramer, John Laughlin, Barry Newman, Tony O'Dell, Cyril O'Reilly, Jamie Rose, Emma Samms, Bo Svenson, George Wyner
93	5	"Coal Miner's Slaughter"	Walter Grauman	Chris Manheim	November 20, 1988	28.6	20.1/29
Lawyer Molly Connors (Megan Mullally), a former student of Jessica Fletcher, returns to her home in a small mining community in West Virginia to investigate the mining accident at a coal mine in which her father and a fellow miner were killed. Her work puts her in direct confrontation with the mine's owner, Tyler Morgan (Chuck Connors). This soon leads to Molly's arrest for when he is found murdered at his private lodge. Jessica arrives in town soon afterward to bail her out and decides to investigate. She quickly learns that Morgan was hated by many in the community and begins to suspect that Molly's investigation may have unnerved someone. Guest stars: Hoyt Axton, Barbara Bain, Cliff De Young, William R. Moses, Denver Pyle, Jared Rushton
94	6	"Wearing of the Green"	Seymour Robbie	Peter S. Fischer	November 27, 1988	29.9	20.6/29
Jessica visits the store of a reputable jewel dealer in New York hoping to gather research for a new book, only to witness a break-in that leads to the theft of a priceless tiara. Police soon begin investigating the matter, and the case is further complicated when Laszlo Dolby (Michael Constantine), an employee of the store, is stabbed in his apartment. A local news reporter is soon charged with the crime, prompting Jessica to investigate: She believes he is innocent. Jessica begins to uncover a plot that involves the tiara, Dolby, and a reclusive actress (Jean Peters, in her final acting role) who was once involved with Dolby — and who once owned the tiara. The two women police detectives, Stacey and Chadwick, are caricatures of the lead characters on Cagney & Lacey. Guest stars: Lucie Arnaz, Barbara Bosson, Erin Gray, Patty McCormack, John McMartin, David Naughton, David Sheiner
95	7	"The Last Flight of the Dixie Damsel"	Vincent McEveety	Peter S. Fischer	December 18, 1988	27.8	19.9/31
A missing military plane that had been lost during the Korean War while returning to the United States, is found and brought back by the US Air Force. Jessica, whose husband was a crew member of the plane, joins the surviving crew members and their families as the plane is brought in. However, all are shocked when they learn that the only member who was unaccounted for was found dead aboard, after being shot in the chest. Jessica is appalled when her husband is blamed for the murder, and intends to investigate what really happened. She soon discovers clues that there may have been a stowaway aboard, especially when one of the other crew members is later critically assaulted outside a restaurant. Guest stars: Michael Ansara, Jane Greer, Clifton James, Martin Milner, Dale Robertson, Richard Roundtree, Robin Strasser, Efrem Zimbalist Jr.
96	8	"Prediction: Murder"	Walter Grauman	Richard Stanley & Ralph Mayering, Jr.	January 1, 1989	34.7	22.9/36
Real estate magnate Lee Goddard (Dale Robertson) manages to coax Jessica to visit him at his ranch in Arizona, as he tends to his son Del who recently lost his job. To cheer things up, his son invites professional psychic Franchesco (David Birney), an idol of his wife Jill, to perform at the ranch, only for him to claim that she is in great danger. When Jill is kidnapped, Lee is surprised when she dies in a car accident shortly after he pays her ransom. Jessica is suspicious about both events, and begins to believe something is deeply wrong, prompting her to investigate whether they may be connected to the recent disappearance of a servant at the ranch. Guest stars: Melody Anderson, Michael Parks, Lisa Pelikan, Geoffrey Scott, Michael Spound
97	9	"Something Borrowed, Someone Blue"	John Llewellyn Moxey	Philip Gerson	January 8, 1989	37.0	25.1/35
Following their mishap in New York, Grady prepares himself for his wedding with Donna at her parents' lavish estate. Jessica finds herself among the first guests to arrive before the wedding ceremony, all of whom find the family's abrasive housekeeper, Harriet Lundgren (Conchata Ferrell), to be somewhat demanding and rude. But on the day of the wedding, as more guests arrive, trouble occurs when Lundgren is found murdered in the garden, killed with a meat thermometer. With Donna's father panicking about the ceremony being stalled, Jessica eases his mind by working alongside the deputy chief of police to uncover what happened, and is convinced that Harriet may have known something that warranted her murder. Guest stars: Patricia Barry, Ray Buktenica, Rick Hurst, Bill Macy, Howard Morris, Betsy Palmer, Eugene Roche, Gale Storm, Barbara Townsend
98	10	"Weave a Tangled Web"	Seymour Robbie	Robert Swanson	January 15, 1989	31.6	21.9/33
Vivian Proctor (Pamela Bellwood), a married Cabot Cove woman with two step children, is being blackmailed by Eric Bowman, a local gambler and womanizer who has found out she is also married to a man in New York. The morning after a recent meeting between the two, Bowman is found stabbed to death in a hotel room, with Vivian's car keys lying nearby. Sheriff Metzger learns that Bowman was facing divorce for his womanizing and financial problems, Jessica soon must help Vivian who feels trapped by the decisions of her life and the lies she has told, after her husband in Cabot Cove is charged with murder. Jessica soon suspects the crime has a simple motive behind it, when she considers what Vivian was doing with Bowman on the day of his murder. Guest stars: George Chakiris, Mel Ferrer, Charles Haid, Stanley Kamel, Gloria Loring
99	11	"The Search for Peter Kerry"	Walter Grauman	Peter S. Fischer	February 5, 1989	38.7	25.9/37
An elderly multi-millionaire (William Prince) desperately seeks to find his missing grandson, Peter Kerry, who disappeared over twenty years ago. Jessica soon wonders if he may have been found, when Peter's college friend Danny Schubert (Michael Beck) thinks that a restaurant pianist, named Rick Barton, is the spitting image of Peter. Jessica soon accompanies the pair, along with Danny's ex, to meet with the millionaire on a weekend trip, but soon questions if Rick really is Peter after learning others have tried to deceive the grandfather for his finder's fee. Then the matter is complicated when Danny is murdered in the millionaire's garage, stabbed in the chest. Guest stars: Mason Adams, Sam Bottoms, Vanessa Brown, Anita Morris, Lorna Patterson, Marc Singer, Lane Smith
100	12	"Smooth Operators"	Anthony Shaw	Gerald K. Siegel	February 12, 1989	31.9	22.2/33
Jessica reunites with her friend Lt. Timothy Hanratty (Barney Martin) in New York, as both become involved in investigating the suspicious death of a man who was found by local tramps. They soon discover the man was Elliot Winston, an accountant for a prestigious private hospital, who died from alcohol poisoning. However, Winston's devoted neighbor (Shirley Knight) claims he had been a successful recovering alcoholic and hadn't touched a drop recently. She adds that he had papers regarding a private investigation that have gone missing. Jessica decides to go undercover to investigate further, as Hanratty attempts to convince his superiors they are dealing with a murder, despite them being convinced there is no case to solve. Guest stars: Dirk Benedict, Nicolas Coster, Lise Hilboldt, Michael McGrady, Dennis Patrick, Peter Van Norden, Edward Winter
101	13	"Fire Burn, Cauldron Bubble"	John Llewellyn Moxey	Tom B. Sawyer	February 19, 1989	34.0	22.5/34
Cabot Cove residents are anxious following of sightings of a person dressed as a witch who was burned at the stake 300 years ago, which a visiting author has made a book about and plans to launch. At the same time, local librarian Mildred Terhune is shocked when her sister Irene, who was presumed dead, returns back into her life. When another sighting is made at a barn, which goes up shortly afterwards, Jessica and Metzger find themselves dealing with murder when Irene's body is found in the barn's cellar after the flames are put out. Both soon find themselves dealing with a cloud of deception, fear, and confusion, as they attempt to uncover when Irene was murdered and for what reason. Guest stars: Juliana Donald, Brad Dourif, Bill Maher, Roddy McDowall, Russell Nype, Christopher Stone, Dee Wallace Stone, John J. York
102	14	"From Russia...with Blood"	Vincent McEveety	Donald Ross	February 26, 1989	33.3	22.8/33
While attending a reception in Moscow that is part of an international writer's conference, Jessica does not notice Russian writer Sergei Chaloff slipping a canister of microfilm into her purse. Moments later, a waiter steals it and attempts to escape. He is soon pursued by security and presumed to be shot dead by them in a gun battle. Deprived of her passport by police who suspect she was involved in the matter, Jessica discovers the waiter was killed by another party, and soon must prove Chaloff's innocence when he is charged for the crime. She soon discovers the microfilm in her possession, and believes it may hold a crucial clue behind what was behind the incident. Guest stars: Jack Bannon, Peter Donat, Anthony Geary, Jeremy Kemp, David McCallum, Judy Parfitt, Adrian Zmed
103	15	"Alma Murder"	Anthony Shaw	Chris Manheim	March 12, 1989	30.5	21.2/32
Jessica returns to her former university when her old sorority sister, Emily Dyers (Dinah Shore), calls to reveal that their much loved professor, Leon Walker, has confessed to murdering a conniving female student named Rhonda Sykes. In arriving, she learns that Rhonda was much disliked for her disrespectable and dishonest behavior, especially after she survived a car crash that killed another student. Working alongside the district attorney, a fellow classmate from her college days, Jessica suspects Leon is covering for someone and that Rhonda may have been blackmailing someone after being in possession of several expensive items in her student home that would be difficult for a student to afford. Guest stars: Jason Beghe, E.G. Marshall, Janice Rule, Dana Sparks, Kate Vernon, Ralph Waite
104	16	"Truck Stop"	Vincent McEveety	Philip Gerson	April 2, 1989	30.4	21.2/34
On her way to Los Angeles with writer Walter Murray (Mike Connors), who suspiciously decided to drive rather than fly, Jessica finds that the pair must pull-in for the night at a small town truck stop. Upon arriving, the pair find that the stop's diner is run by Pete Gerakaris (Ron Karabatsos), who bullies both his wife and his daughter. Walter, who was sweet on Pete's wife, Vera (Elizabeth Ashley), years ago, is unhappy with the situation. That night, both Pete and a local mechanic are murdered. Jessica is shocked to find Walter left a recorded message, confessing to both killings, the mechanic having died immediately during a shootout between himself and Walter who later dies from his gunshot wound back in his hotel room. Although the sheriff assumes the case is closed, Jessica is convinced something is not right about Walter's confession. Guest stars: Peter Haskell, Andrew Prine, Jill Schoelen, Kristoffer Tabori, Isaac Turner
105	17	"The Sins of Castle Cove"	John Llewellyn Moxey	Robert Van Scoyk	April 9, 1989	28.1	19.3/29
Jessica's former student, Sybil Reed (Page Hannah), releases her debut novel based on the town of Cabot Cove. However, the residents ecstatic delight to read it is soon turned into horror when the novel paints many of them in a different light, including Jessica's beauty parlor friends. When Sybil returns home to gauge reactions while staying with Jessica, neither expect to hear news later that night that Miriam Harwood, a woman who had an impact on Sybil's life, has been found murdered in her home. Metzger is divided between accusing her deadbeat husband or the local butcher she was in love with, but Jessica soon suspects there was another who loved Miriam but who never realized she didn't care about them in the same way. Guest stars: Luke Askew, Frederick Coffin, Graham Jarvis, Fran Ryan
106	18	"Trevor Hudson's Legacy"	Walter Grauman	Story by : Eric Houston; Teleplay by : Paul Savage	April 16, 1989	31.6	21.5/36
Young editor Robert Jarrett is torn over publishing the last work made by deceased writer Trevor Hudson. Calling in Jessica for help, he reveals he had to ghost-write it because he found evidence that Hudson never wrote anything in his life, but Hudson's family refuse to let him reveal the truth as it will humiliate and financially ruin them. The day after she arrives, Jarret is found dead and the notes he was using missing. Everyone is soon attempting to prove their innocence, making it hard to discern the truth, while leaving a visiting drifter to be arrested for the crime. Jessica becomes convinced the prime suspect is actually being framed, and attempts to work out who was desperate enough to prevent Jarret exposing the truth. Guest stars: Georgia Brown, Don Galloway, Robert Klein, Michael Learned, Yvette Nipar, Barrie Youngfellow
107	19	"Double Exposure"	Anthony Shaw	Robert Swanson	April 30, 1989	28.2	19.6/33
Jessica is surprised when in Boston she encounters John Winslow, an old acquaintance of hers, only for him to deny knowing her. When Winslow's wife claims he died of a heart attack in Chicago, Jessica suspects they are lying and recruits Harry McGraw (Jerry Orbach) to investigate. He learns that Winslow is living under an alias for unknown reasons, but neither are prepared when they find him dead in the apartment he was renting. Jessica and Harry soon learn that Winslow was in hiding after testifying against his employers over accusations of fraud, and attempt to identify his killer as they face problems from the detectives handling the investigation. Guest stars: Christine Belford, Earl Boen, Jon Cypher, Robert Logan, William Lucking, Karen Morrow, Andrew Stevens
108	20	"Three Strikes, You're Out"	Seymour Robbie	Donald Ross	May 7, 1989	25.6	18.5/30
Jessica visits Scottsdale, Arizona, to cheer on her nephew Johnny Eaton, who recently joined the town's minor league baseball team alongside a fellow player as part of trade. However, the day after their arrival, local sports reporter Loretta Lee (Terri Garber) is found murdered in her hotel room. The local police initially believe she was a victim of a robbery, but soon suspect Johnny's friend when it transpires his identity was false. Jessica is convinced the police have the wrong person, and soon digs in deeper behind Loretta's relationship with the team and whether there was another person with motive to kill. Guest stars: Bernie Casey, Tim Dunigan, Vince Edwards, Shea Farrell, Anne Lockhart, Robert Mandan, Reni Santoni, Paul Sorvino
109	21	"Mirror, Mirror on the Wall: Part 1"	Walter Grauman	Peter S. Fischer	May 14, 1989	22.1	15.3/26
Mystery writer Eudora McVeigh (Jean Simmons) is facing problems at home with her marriage, when she learns from her publisher that her work is no longer popular as that of Jessica's. Unable to cope, Eudora travels to Cabot Cove, planning to steal whatever manuscript Jessica is working on, as the writer herself is question by Seth over her hectic workload. Shortly after Eudora arrives with a gift - a basket of apples - both overhear news that the body of a private detective has just been found by locals. At the same time, Eudora's husband, her step-son, and her personal assistant, all arrive in town after following her. As Metzger discovers the private eye had been murdered, Jessica is shocked to find Seth collapsed in her kitchen and close to death. Guest stars: Richard Anderson, Shelley Fabares, David Hedison, Ken Howard, Daniel McDonald
110	22	"Mirror, Mirror on the Wall: Part 2"	Walter Grauman	Peter S. Fischer	May 21, 1989	25.0	17.6/30
Jessica is shocked when she learns that Seth collapsed because he had been poisoned. Both she and Metzger find it came from the apples that Eudora brought, and soon she is arrested on attempted murder after being caught in possession of Jessica's latest work. Realizing her life has become a mess, Eudora pleads her innocence and begs for help. Jessica begins to suspect that she was meant to be poisoned, and believes that this could be linked to the recent murder in town. As she questions Eudora's associates who are still in Cabot Cove and seeks the truth, Jessica soon finds herself questioning her own life's path after witnessing the situation that Eudora's life has fallen into. Guest stars: Richard Anderson, Shelley Fabares, David Hedison, Ken Howard, Daniel McDonald, Jean Simmons

=== Season 6 (1989–90) ===
No. overall	No. in season	Title	Directed by	Written by	Original release date	U.S. viewers (millions)
111	1	"Appointment in Athens"	Vincent McEveety	Tom B. Sawyer	September 24, 1989	29.9
Jessica is all set to head to Egypt for a book tour, when she is surprised to finds herself unwillingly entangled with Michael Haggerty (Len Cariou) once more. Without warning, he diverts her to a flight to Athens, revealing that he needs her assistance for an important assignment concerning the kidnapping of a fellow British agent. Upon arrival, the pair are surprised when a woman approaches them with intentions of becoming Michael's cover story in place of Jessica but are shocked when she is later found murdered in their hotel room. As police question their motives, the pair swiftly work to determine who was responsible, and whether it is linked to the kidnapping. Guest stars: June Chadwick, Thom Christopher, Steve Inwood, Ian Ogilvy, Richard Todd, Peter Van Norden
112	2	"Seal of the Confessional"	Vincent McEveety	Story by : Whitney Wherrett Roberson; Teleplay by : Lynne Kelsey	October 1, 1989	31.7
Father Donald Barnes (Hunt Block) is temporarily assigned to Cabot Cove in place of another priest who is visiting family, and is surprised when the young Kelly Barrett (Jennifer Runyon) confess to killing her stepfather Evan West. Sworn to uphold the sacrament of confession, but torn apart by what he knows, Barnes turns to Jessica for help when Evan's body is found on the shoreline near town. As Metzger arrests a young man who came into possession of Evan's knife and is assumed to be the killer, Jessica finds that the only way to uncover the truth is to discover what truly happened between Kelly and Evan on the day of the murder, especially when the victim's relationship to his step-daughter soon comes to light. Guest stars: Bonnie Bartlett, Alan Feinstein, Robert Horton, Lance Kerwin
113	3	"The Grand Old Lady"	Vincent McEveety	Peter S. Fischer	October 8, 1989	26.2
Jessica invites viewers to hear the tale of recently deceased mystery writer Lady Abigail Austin (June Havoc), who had encountered a real-life murder when travelling to the United States in 1947. Aboard the Queen Mary liner, Austin is shocked when a passenger, an ostensible wine merchant called "Peter Daniken", staggers into the first-class lounge and dies from a stab wound. Aided by crossword creator/aspiring journalist Christy McGinn (Gary Kroeger), she decided to investigate to see who among the possible suspects was responsible, especially when Daniken's background turns out to be a mystery and there is evidence he was in possession of plates for counterfeiting dollar bills. Guest stars: Mark Lindsay Chapman, Dane Clark, John Karlen, Aubrey Morris, Henry Polic II, James Stephens, Gordon Thomson, Robert Vaughn, Paxton Whitehead
114	4	"The Error of Her Ways"	Anthony Shaw	Donald Ross	October 15, 1989	27.8
In Palm Springs, California, real estate developer Clark Randall is murdered and his wife arrested for the crime, after Jessica helps the police detective in charge with their investigation. At the same time, the mystery writer is shocked when she and several others learn that Clark was embezzling their investment funds from a development he was handling. As the project falls apart, Marian is later given bail when her sister seeks to prove her innocence, only to wind up murdered herself in her own home. Believing someone else may have been involved in Clark's murder, Jessica attempts to redeem herself, in order to find the real killer behind the two deaths. Guest stars: Susan Blakely, Katherine Cannon, Paul Gleason, Elliott Gould, Barbara Parkins, Marshall Thompson
115	5	"Jack & Bill"	Chuck Bowman	Peter S. Fischer & Chuck Bowman	October 29, 1989	30.6
Jessica invites viewers to hear the tale of former football star Bill Boyle (Ken Howard), who was thrown into a bizarre case when he became a private investigator. Struggling with his new occupation and declared bankrupt, Boyle is asked by his friend Johnny Wheeler (Max Baer Jr.) to look after his dog Jack for a short while. No sooner has he accepted the request, when someone attempts to steal Jack. When Boyle learns that Wheeler died in hospital after being fatally stabbed, Boyle soon suspects a connection between both events, and soon becomes caught up in a complicated plot that Jack proves to be a big help in solving. Guest stars: Susan Anton, Warren Berlinger, Pat Harrington Jr., Ellen Travolta, Glynn Turman
116	6	"Dead Letter"	Anthony Shaw	Paul Schiffer	November 5, 1989	29.7
Following a rummage sale in Cabot Cove, Jessica finds a letter jammed into a dresser she purchased, and hands it over to Bud Fricksey, one of the town's volunteer firefighters. Later that evening, a local furniture goes up in flames, and Bud is found dead after the fire is put out. When it transpires that he was murdered when trying to tackle the flames, there are plenty of suspects and theories. Jessica and Sheriff Metzger (Ron Masak) soon have several to deal with, from arson and insurance fraud to an affair involving the victim's wife and a local mechanic as well as a disagreement between Bud and another firefighter over a business deal he had entered into. Guest stars: Susan Anspach, Rosemary DeCamp, George Furth, Max Gail, Jonathan Goldsmith, Robin Riker-Hasley, Al Waxman
117	7	"Night of the Tarantula"	Vincent McEveety	Chris Manheim	November 12, 1989	25.8
In Jamaica, Jessica attends a surprise birthday party arranged by her friend Olivia Waverly for her son Adam at her family's plantation, won by her late husband in a card game. While Adam is set to inherit the plantation, his family are shocked to find their plans to marry him are fruitless as he already has a wife, despite his new father-in-law opposing the union fiercely. Shortly after the party, his uncle is found murdered in his room, while Adam is nearly killed with rat poison. Jessica is not convinced a voodoo curse is behind the events, and investigates what truly is happening, discovering hidden secrets in the plantation and the motive behind the crimes. Guest stars: Cheryl Arutt, Grand L. Bush, Hurd Hatfield, Ji-Tu Cumbuka, James Lancaster, Patrick Massett, John Rhys-Davies, Nancy Valen, Shani Wallis
118	8	"When the Fat Lady Sings"	Walter Grauman	Peter S. Fischer	November 19, 1989	29.5
Reformed thief Dennis Stanton (Keith Michell) reunites with Jessica in San Francisco and invites her to attend the opera with him. When the performance ends, its lead singer, Rosanno Bertolucci (Theodore Bikel), is found unconscious in a back alley after apparently having shot dead a young man who had reportedly attacked him. While the police suspect murder, Jessica is not convinced especially as she had witnessed the altercation between the two men. The matter is soon complicated when Stanton is tailed by federal agents hot on the trail of a cache of stolen gems smuggled into the country, and a young journalist involved with the opera is later murdered. Guest stars: Kathleen Beller, Lila Kaye, Carol Lawrence, Walter Olkewicz, Jerry Stiller
119	9	"Test of Wills"	Anthony Shaw	Robert Swanson	November 26, 1989	27.9
Millionaire Henry Reynard (Gene Barry) invites Jessica to his remote island home, where he offers her a hefty cheque for her services, believing that one of his family has plans to murder him for his money. The mystery writer is not receptive to the idea, as while his son and daughter and their spouses are problematic and greedy, his granddaughter Kim is not. Henry soon fakes his murder, but no-one expects a real death in his absence when Kim's fiancé is found shot dead in the millionaire's pool house. Jessica agrees to help the local sheriff prove who was responsible when it transpires the victim had been the subject of a private investigation into their background. Guest stars: Philip Abbott, John Callahan, Jill Carroll, Keir Dullea, Marj Dusay, Morgan Woodward, Cassie Yates
120	10	"Class Act"	Allen Reisner	Peter S. Fischer	December 3, 1989	28.5
Jessica invites viewers to hear the tale of Jake Ballinger, a police lieutenant assigned to teach a criminology class at a local university. Attempting to have no students for his class, his efforts only lead to him finding two students willing to remain. Intrigued, he decides to put them to work on reinvestigating a murder case he has doubts about. Several months ago, Ballinger was investigating the death of Janet Carr, a young woman who was found dead by a drifter that was later charged with the crime. Believing there was more behind the case, especially as his teaching assignment was punishment for not letting the case be closed, Ballinger and his two students discover a connection between the victim and state senator who forced the investigation's closure. Guest stars: Grant Heslov, Lise Hilboldt, Robert Lipton, Heather McAdam, Barry Newman, Gerald S. O'Loughlin, Robert Pine, Garry Walberg
121	11	"Town Father"	John Llewellyn Moxey	Philip Gerson	December 17, 1989	27.2
Cabot Cove's local mayor Sam Booth (Richard Paul) is running for re-election as others seek to claim his job in hopes of pushing for change within town, including new property developments. When a young woman, Annie Mae Chapman (Lee Purcell), arrives in town claiming he is the father of her children, Sam refutes the claims as the news hits his reputation badly. Jessica suspects there is more to the matter when she begins doubting the woman's story and the reason for her appearance in town. When Chapman is later found murdered in her motel room, Sheriff Metzger (Ron Masak) is forced to investigate, especially when Jessica soon discovers the victim was a set-up and that one of Sam's opponents may have been trying to influence the election. Guest stars: Orson Bean, John Considine, Basil Hoffman, William Lanteau, Holland Taylor
122	12	"Goodbye Charlie"	Anthony Shaw	Robert Van Scoyk	January 7, 1990	31.5
Jessica invites viewers to visit the plot of her latest novels concerning an unsuccessful private investigator, Frank Albertson, and his wife (Bill Maher and Faith Ford). The couple, facing eviction due to money troubles, discovers that Frank's uncle recently received an inheritance, and attempt to claim it by faking the uncle's death. Attempting to claim an unidentified body in Huckabee, Nevada, the pair find their plans jeopardized when two additional claims are made on the body. With the sheriff uncertain of whose is true, Frank tries to be sneaky in getting his scheme to succeed, but soon discovers the other claims are just as faked, especially when one of them is being made to conceal a murder. Guest stars: Michael Callan, Bryan Cranston, Lise Cutter, John Finnegan, David Huddleston, Clyde Kusatsu, Ernie Lively
123	13	"If the Shoe Fits"	Anthony Shaw	Lynne Kelsey	January 21, 1990	29.2
Kevin Bryce (Jonathan Brandis) is eager to do odd jobs around Cabot Cove for anyone, including Jessica, to help his struggling single mother Marla (Season Hubley) with her financial troubles. The Bryces are one of several people who resent the fees imposed on them by sleazy landlord Jack Franzen. A few days later, Jessica becomes concerned when Marla has disappeared, leaving Kevin on his own. After they file a missing person report with Metzger, both are shocked to find Franzen's body a mile from Kevin's home. Metzger suspects Marla of murdering the victim - they had disappeared the same day as she did, and the murder weapon, a shovel, belonged to her. Jessica is unconvinced, especially as Kevin suspects someone else was involved. Guest stars: Bruce Glover, Bridget Hanley, John Harkins, Lorna Luft, Kiel Martin
124	14	"How to Make a Killing Without Really Trying"	Walter Grauman	Story by : Charles Leinenweder; Teleplay by : Robert Swanson	February 4, 1990	25.7
Playboy stockbroker Philip Royce (John Calvin) is more interested in golf and women than handling his clients, including Jessica, leaving his work to be done by his secretary Norma Pulaski (Lela Ivey). Royce's behaviour does little to help with the investment firm he co-owns, as others fear a takeover bid may succeed against their wishes. When Royce is found murdered in his apartment, Norma is suspected of the crime due to her handling of his business affairs. Jessica is not convinced that this is the case, especially as the victim had slowly made enemies with others, and decides to help Norma out of her situation, especially when her boyfriend is later accused of murdering Royce out of jealousy. Guest stars: Morgan Brittany, Edd Byrnes, Farley Granger, David Groh, Joe Maruzzo, Kevin Tighe, Barry Van Dyke
125	15	"The Fixer-Upper"	John Llewellyn Moxey	Story by : Paul Schiffer; Teleplay by : Oliver Hailey	February 11, 1990	23.7
Jessica's niece Victoria Griffin (Genie Francis) is now working as a realtor agent after her husband's TV series is cancelled, and her first commission resides with the sale of an estate in Beverly Hills. The owner, Deborah Tarkington, is unwilling to sell to a buyer who seeks the property for a major development, leaving Victoria in a difficult position. But when Tarkington is found dead in her home, the police arrest Victoria for the crime as the murder weapon bore her fingerprints. The mystery writer is convinced the police are mistaken, and works to prove Victoria's innocence, believing the real killer is among the parties who were interested in the victim's mansion. Guest stars: Dean Butler, Chad Everett, Vicki Frederick, Marty Ingels, Andrea King, George Maharis, Ken Olandt, Dack Rambo, Brenda Vaccaro
126	16	"The Big Show of 1965"	Jerry Jameson	Robert Van Scoyk	February 25, 1990	25.1
Taping for the anniversary edition of Barry Barnes' variety television show, sees Jessica invited to watch rehearsals with the same list of guests who performed on the program in 1965. The mystery writer's invite included a request that she investigate the unsolved murder of singer Ricky King, who was killed backstage in his changing room. No sooner does she become involved, another murder occurs, this time with the show's writer Art Sommers. Aided by a retired NYPD detective who handled the investigation into King's death, she soon begins to suspect a link between the two murders, and that everything hinges on the events surrounding the Haley Sisters after 1965. Guest stars: Michael Cole, Anne Francis, Elaine Joyce, Sheldon Leonard, Gavin MacLeod, Don Most, Donald O'Connor, Connie Stevens, Jeff Yagher
127	17	"Murder -- According to Maggie"	John Llewellyn Moxey	Peter S. Fischer	March 4, 1990	26.1
Jessica invites viewers to hear the tale of one of her former students, Maggie McCauley (Diana Canova), who went on to become the producer and writer for a hit television program. Despite the show's success, the network executive Keith Carmody threatened to cancel it, until he was later found shot dead in the screening room for the show's studio. Maggie decides to find out what happened, and, aided by a police lieutenant friend investigating the murder, learns that Carmody had plenty of enemies, many of whom resented the way he behaved and worked, along with the decisions he undertook in his job. Both soon suspect the murder may have been linked to something the victim did against the killer. Guest stars: Denis Arndt, Talia Balsam, Miriam Flynn, Dwayne Hickman, Leann Hunley, Bruce Kirby, Paul Kreppel, Gary Sandy, Tim Thomerson, Tom Troupe
128	18	"O'Malley's Luck"	Michael J. Lynch	Story by : Gerald K. Siegel; Teleplay by : Lynne Kelsey	March 25, 1990	23.5
Jessica invites viewers to hear the tale of NYPD detective, Lt. James O'Malley (Pat Hingle), who became involved in investigating the suspicious death of Gretchen Trent. Her husband Richard, a property developer, is convinced she committed suicide, but neither O'Malley nor his niece, recruited by him to join as a detective, are convinced. Richard attempts to side-line further investigation by the police, attempting to use the detective's reputation against him, but this only fuels suspicions that his wife's death may have been murder. As both look further into the matter, O'Malley begins to suspect the victim may have been killed by someone else, despite Richard's suspicious conduct. Guest stars: Jay Acovone, Stacy Edwards, Ron Leibman, Nicholas Pryor, Francesca P. Roberts, Carolyn Seymour, Philip Sterling
129	19	"Always a Thief"	Walter Grauman	Peter S. Fischer	April 8, 1990	20.1
Jessica's friend, Dennis Stanton (Keith Michell), a former cat burglar, sends a cassette tape to her in Cabot Cove, revealing that he now works as an investigator for an insurance company in San Francisco. In his recording, he relates how he became involved in solving a murder during his first case - the theft of a valuable coin. The crime led to the murder of the owner's gardener, and eventually suspicion fell on businessman Langston Douglas, the son of the coin's wealthy owner (Dina Merrill). However, Langston was later found murdered during the police investigation and the coin was not in his possession, thus prompting Dennis to determine what really happened after the theft. Guest stars: Lisa Blount, Roscoe Born, Aharon Ipalé, Shirley Knight, Chris Mulkey, Ed Nelson, James Sloyan, Ken Swofford, Hallie Todd
130	20	"Shear Madness"	Walter Grauman	Chris Manheim	April 29, 1990	22.8
Jessica travels to Fairville, Texas, to attend the upcoming wedding of her cousin Ann Owens Arden (Shirley Jones) to Bill Spenser (Sandy McPeak), a former town rebel who made a fortune in Alaska. During a reception before the ceremony, Ann is surprised when her brother George (Robert Walker Jr.) turns up out of the blue, having been in a mental institution. No sooner after his arrival, Bill is murdered with George accused of the crime after he goes missing. Jessica is shocked to discover the crime mirrors the same sequence of events that led to the murder of Ann's first fiancé 15 years ago, which her brother was accused of committing. When George is later found, Jessica questions him and soon begins to have doubts that he is the real killer. Guest stars: Barbara Babcock, Dennis Christopher, William Lucking, Doris Roberts
131	21	"The Szechuan Dragon"	Kevin G. Cremin	Tom B. Sawyer	May 6, 1990	21.4
Grady Fletcher and his wife Donna, now pregnant with their first child, arrive in Cabot Cove to house-sitting for Jessica while she is away in London. The day after they arrive, both are shocked to find the body of a dead sailor in the living room. Metzger investigates for them, hoping to not bother the mystery writer in her absence, and soon links the crime to the recent arrival of three strangers and an odd Oriental ornament in Jessica's possession that each seem to seek. Grady and Donna find themselves soon embroiled in the mystery further, but as things begin to heat up, they soon discover that the murder may have been committed for a different reason. Guest stars: Belinda Bauer, Ramon Bieri, Elinor Donahue, James Lew, Cliff Osmond, David Warner Note: While this episode takes place in Cabot Cove and features Doctor Seth Hazlet, Sheriff Metzger, and Deputy Sheriff Floyd, Jessica Fletcher only appears briefly in a number of telephone conversations.
132	22	"The Sicilian Encounter"	Kevin G. Cremin	Robert Swanson	May 20, 1990	19.2
Jessica receives a letter from her British agent friend Michael Haggerty (Len Cariou), who recalls an intriguing assignment that led to him dealing with a mysterious murder. In Italy, Haggerty was assigned to pose as a priest in order to secure a black book containing valuable information. The book itself was placed into a vault in Switzerland by a member of an Italian mafia family, prompting the agent to become involved in a sudden marriage between the widow and a local shyster seeking to secure her late husband's money. The matter soon came to a head when an imposter was murdered for posing as a member of the family, prompting Haggerty to abscond with the couple, where he soon learnt the book was sought out by another party. Guest stars: Vincent Baggetta, Joseph Cali, George DiCenzo, Deidre Hall, Robert Miranda, Ian Ogilvy, John Standing

=== Season 7 (1990–91) ===
No. overall	No. in season	Title	Directed by	Written by	Original release date	U.S. viewers (millions)
133	1	"Trials and Tribulations"	Vincent McEveety	Peter S. Fischer	September 16, 1990	23.1
In New York, Jessica is surprised when her lawyer reveals she is being sued by Geraldine Stone (Carrie Hamilton) for the wrongful arrest of her father, who recently died when trying to escape from prison. The mystery writer is later shocked when a witness, a taxi driver who is terminally ill, claims that they gave a false statement that helped put Geraldine's father away. When the witness is later found dead in their home, questions are raised behind what happened by both the police detective and the district attorney who handled the Stone case. Jessica is convinced something is not right when she discovers that Geraldine's lawyer has an unsavoury reputation, and soon questions if the police are dealing with something other than murder. Guest stars: Michael Beck, Molly Cheek, Stephen Furst, George Hearn, Kim Hunter, George Maharis, Ben Masters
134	2	"Deadly Misunderstanding"	Anthony Shaw	Robert E. Swanson	September 23, 1990	23.3
Following a bicycle accident in Cabot Cove that breaks her arm, Jessica hires Melissa Maddox (Lise Cutter) to help type up her latest manuscript while she recovers. Her new assistant has a secret admirer in local writer Jeff Ogden, who works for the local paper, and an unhappy marriage with her arrogant and womanizing husband Ralph (Cliff Potts), who is disliked by many. When Melissa returns home one evening, she finds Ralph dead, having been stabbed in the chest with scissors. Frightened, she convinces Jeff to help move the body so it appeared he was killed at his lumbar yard. When Metzger is not convinced and suspects both of the murder, Jessica decides to find out what happened, believing another was involved in the murder. Guest stars: Geoffrey Lewis, Janet Margolin, David McCallum, Mary Ann Pascal
135	3	"See You in Court, Baby"	Vincent McEveety	Peter S. Fischer	September 30, 1990	22.9
Jessica recounts to the viewers a recent case that Dennis Stanton (Keith Michell) handled in San Francisco, concerning the arrest of Ed Kriegler (Tom Isbell) for the murder of ruthless divorce attorney Truman Calloway (Robert Reed). The victim had received verbal threats from Kriegler after Calloway used unethical methods to convince his wife to divorce them. Although the police are convinced they have their man, Dennis learns that the attorney had other enemies, including ex-husbands who hated him for his work, ex-wives who struggled with the way he treated them, and a lawyer who sought to beat him no matter what. He soon discovers someone has lied, after the police arrest a second person for the murder. Guest stars: Heidi Bohay, Judith Chapman, Charles Haid, Vera Miles, Nana Visitor
136	4	"Hannigan's Wake"	Vincent McEveety	Peter S. Fischer	October 28, 1990	25.8
Jessica is saddened to learn that her old friend Daniel Hannigan (Van Johnson), a journalist and writer, is dying, and agrees to take finish a book he was writing that would reopen the investigation of a murder that took place 16 years ago. The victim, Lydia Grant Thurlow, was found dead in her home after a struggle, and her husband Martin was convicted of the crime. Hannigan was asked to look into the matter by Martin's sister, and became convinced with the evidence he could access that Martin was innocent of the crime. When Jessica picks up where he left off, she finds herself interviewing all those involved to determine who else had a motive for the crime, and soon uncovers a cover-up with the murder. Guest stars: Bradford Dillman, Anthony Geary, Cynthia Harris, Mala Powers, Raphael Sbarge, Guy Stockwell, Stephen Young, Efrem Zimbalist Jr.
137	5	"The Family Jewels"	Jerry Jameson	Tom B. Sawyer	November 4, 1990	26.2
In a jewelry store in New York to get her watch fixed, Jessica is surprised when the manager refuses to pursue charges against wealthy Sheila Finley (Brenda Vaccaro) when she steals an expensive necklace from the store. When she visits a fund-raiser for an old friend being held in Finley's home, Jessica is shocked when the woman's chauffeur, Rocco Pastolino, is found murdered in her garage. Police assume Finley was responsible for the murder, as she had been in a relationship with the victim, but Jessica is not certain that is correct when the police's suspect is later attacked. The mystery writer is convinced Pastolino may have been causing problems for others and potentially blackmailing his killer. Guest stars: Joey Aresco, John Considine, Mike Farrell, Stanley Kamel, Jonna Lee, Howard McGillin, Charles Rocket
138	6	"A Body to Die For"	Anthony Shaw	Donald Ross	November 11, 1990	26.0
A new health club is opened in Cabot Cove and proves a big hit with many of the women in town. Many of the men resent this, due to the fact that the women are attracted to its owner, fitness instructor Wayne Bennett, including Jessica's friend Eve Simpson (Julie Adams). However, he soon becomes a suspect in a murder when a former friend, Fred Keppard, is found shot dead in Simpson's home. Metzger soon discover the pair were former associates who conducted several scams in the past, and that Keppard was in town to conduct fraud on local residents. As secrets are exposed about Bennett that shock the women, Jessica investigates and soon discovers that the victim was not the intended target of the killer. Guest stars: Jason Beghe, Ruta Lee, Ernie Lively, Patricia McPherson, Hugh O'Brian, James Olson, Sally Struthers
139	7	"The Return of Preston Giles"	Walter Grauman	Tom B. Sawyer	November 18, 1990	24.5
Jessica is shocked to reunite with Preston Giles (Arthur Hill), her first publisher whom she later found to have been involved in a murder. Having been paroled from prison, Giles is now helping out his former publishing company out of financial troubles, as part of his parole conditions. However, he is not happy to find his old partner Martin Bergman (George Coe) still works there, and is concerned that the new vice-president wants him to bring Jessica back to the company. When Bergman is found murdered, Giles becomes the prime suspect in the case. Even though she is uncomfortable about his return, Jessica begins to doubt he could be responsible, and feels that someone else was involved, especially when Giles takes a fatal risk to expose them. Guest stars: Lois Chiles, Arlene Golonka, Michael McKean, Todd Susman, Brynn Thayer, Gordon Thomson
140	8	"The Great Twain Robbery"	Jerry Jameson	Steve Brown	November 25, 1990	24.7
During a book signing in San Francisco, Jessica runs into Dennis Stanton (Keith Michell), who delightfully regales her with his latest investigation. His insurance company recently offered to insure a rare Mark Twain manuscript that had recently surfaced for $5 million, after it was authenticated. However, Dennis felt something was wrong about the manuscript, and soon suspected foul play when the document is destroyed in a fire, shortly before his close friend, document expert Constantin Stavros (Nehemiah Persoff), was murdered after discovering something about its origins. The only thing the victim left him was a cryptic literary clue. As police investigate the matter, Dennis soon realizes the meaning of the clue, shortly after a second murder occurred. Guest stars: Diane Baker, David Birney, Roy Dotrice, Holly Gagnier, Nehemiah Persoff, James Sloyan, Ken Swofford, Hallie Todd
141	9	"Ballad for a Blue Lady"	Jerry Jameson	William Bigelow	December 2, 1990	25.1
Patti Sue Diamond (Florence Henderson), a famed country singer, is married to her husband Bobby (Jimmy Dean), another country star, and lives a good life in Nashville, Tennessee, with his daughter Alice from a previous marriage. Inviting her friend Jessica, Patti reveals she is concerned about her husband, especially as he is quite stubborn with the company he serves a contract with. The night after her arrival, Jessica and Alice are shocked when Bobby is murdered and Patti is taken to the hospital after being poisoned. Police question who wanted the Diamonds dead, and soon arrest Alice when she is caught trying to murder her step-mother. The mystery writer is not convinced she would kill her father, and suspects a missing recording is a crucial clue in the investigation. Guest stars: Daphne Ashbrook, Jeri Gaile, Blake Gibbons, Mickey Gilley, Gary Grubbs, Tom Hallick, Brandon Maggart, Sheb Wooley
142	10	"Murder in F Sharp"	Kevin G. Cremin	William Bigelow	December 16, 1990	23.0
Jessica narrates a new tale concerning Dennis Stanton (Keith Michell) in San Francisco, who recently was instructed to investigate a matter for his insurance company. The case concerned classical pianist Vaclav Maryska (Ricardo Montalbán), who had insured his hands against damages which were recently burned in a fire in his apartment. During the investigation, Dennis discovered that Maryska's wife Milena (Patricia Neal) was struggling with their marriage and was alienated with her son from a previous marriage. When Milena is later discovered murdered, her son is quickly accused of her murder and arrested soon afterward. Dennis suspects something is not right, and believes his own insurance investigation is linked to the matter. Guest stars: Stephen Caffrey, Melinda Culea, James Sloyan, Hallie Todd
143	11	"Family Doctor"	Walter Grauman	Robert Van Scoyk	January 6, 1991	27.2
While dining in Boston with Jessica, Seth finds himself requested to help discreetly treat the patriarch of a mafia family, Carmine Abruzzi, after he survives an attempt on his life. After the FBI question them over the matter, as local police were investigating the shooting, Seth and Jessica are soon kidnapped by the family's lawyer, where they learn that Carmine died after being treated and the doctor is accused of assassinating him. Jessica is not convinced, as her friend reveals someone gave his unexpected patient a fatal overdose of one of his drugs. Seeking answers, Jessica discover Carmine was making plans to retire that would have brought unwanted changes for the Abruzzi's way of life. Guest stars: Tige Andrews, Joe Cortese, Robert Costanzo, Diane Franklin, Rose Gregorio, Vincent Irizarry, Monte Markham, William Utay, Amy Yasbeck
144	12	"Suspicion of Murder"	Vincent McEveety	Peter S. Fischer	January 20, 1991	27.3
Jessica narrates a new tale she received from Dennis Stanton (Keith Michell) in San Francisco, where he investigated a murder that he was prime suspect in. Dennis had been attending a cocktail party when he ran into Christina Hellinger, an old acquaintance, who is wishing to divorce her brutish husband Danny. When Christina later meets Dennis with a bruise on her face, following a day out, Dennis went to confront Danny at the couple's hotel, only to find him dead. Evading the police, who suspect him of murdering Danny, Dennis was forced to investigate the matter, especially as the victim's death left a hefty inheritance for his two sons. However, it soon becomes clear the murder was conducted by someone he least expected to suspect. Guest stars: Susan Blakely, Sam Bottoms, Dennis Cole, Yuji Okumoto, James Sloyan, Hallie Todd
145	13	"Moving Violation"	Anthony Shaw	Robert E. Swanson	February 3, 1991	23.6
On the roads outside Cabot Cove, Metzger arrests Bradley Hellman, visiting the area, for speeding and attempting to bribe him. While he learns that Bradley has a dark past known by the NYPD, he is forced to release him when his father, a prominent US ambassador, makes trouble for the sheriff. Shortly after doing so, Bradley is found murdered and Metzger resigns in disgust when he becomes a subject of political games. Knowing the sheriff to be a good man, Jessica decides to investigate and prove his innocence. In the course of her investigation, she discovers that the victim was a serious troublemaker, but begins to question why he had been coming to town in the first place. Guest stars: Susan Clark, Jack Colvin, Robert Ginty, Harry Guardino, Philip Baker Hall, Stephen Macht, Suzanne Snyder
146	14	"Who Killed J.B. Fletcher?"	Walter Grauman	Lynn Kelsey	February 10, 1991	24.8
While in Texas on a book tour, Jessica is horrified when news reports claim she was arrested in the town of Bremerton. Seeking to clear up the matter with the local sheriff, she soon discovers that a local woman, Marge Allen (Jane Withers), posed as her to investigate kennel owner Simon McCauley. Meeting with Allen's friends, who run a fan club for Jessica's work, she soon becomes embroiled in a new murder mystery when Allen is found dead in suspicious circumstances. Discovering she was last seen heading to confront McCauley, who has also died in a suspected shooting accident, the mystery writer calls on the club to help her out. She soon suspects Allen may have stumbled onto a murder and had to be silenced. Guest stars: Max Baer Jr., Janet Blair, Betty Garrett, Earl Holliman, Terry Moore, Margaret O'Brien, Jamie Rose, Tom Schanley, Lyman Ward, Marie Windsor
147	15	"The Taxman Cometh"	Anthony Shaw	Donald Ross	February 17, 1991	25.4
On a book tour in Missouri, Jessica visits her old friend Edna Hayes (Phyllis Newman), who owns and runs a successful bakery company. Despite the success, Haynes is facing problems that place her company under financial pressure, as the IRS claims she failed to employee tax deductions for the last two quarters. Her ex-husband Nolan is facing similar troubles from them, but shortly after meeting her to discuss his problems, he is later found murdered apparently tending to a flat tire. Jessica is not convinced when the police arrest Edna for the crime, believing someone is framing her. Investigating herself, the mystery writer discovers the company's problems may be linked to Nolan's murder, and turns to the IRS for assistance. Guest stars: Robin Dearden, Gregg Henry, Macon McCalman, Kent McCord, Roy Thinnes, Fred Willard, Max Wright
148	16	"From the Horse's Mouth"	Jerry Jameson	Gerry Day	February 24, 1991	23.2
Jessica travels to Kentucky to visit her old friend Lamar Morgan and his daughter Christie, a local veterinarian, as they face problems in a neighborly dispute. Morgan is facing a lawsuit regarding two foals he now has that were sired by a stallion belonging to horse breeder Randolph Sterling. The dispute leads to Jessica hiring Harry McGraw to investigate what happened. However, the matter becomes complicated when Sterling is found dead in his office, having received a blow to the head. With Morgan arrested on suspicion of the murder, Jessica and Harry find there are others who may have had reason to kill, especially as the dispute was causing issues within Sterling's family. Guest stars: Melvin Belli, Maxwell Caulfield, Patricia Charbonneau, Robert Donner, Nanette Fabray, Kevin McCarthy, John Allen Nelson, Gregory Walcott
149	17	"The Prodigal Father"	Anthony Shaw	Maryann Kasica & Michael Scheff	March 10, 1991	24.5
Ned Jenks (Donnelly Rhodes) returns to Cabot Cove after disappearing twenty years ago following a bank robbery he committed, having been in prison for another crime. While he intends to reunite with his estranged daughter Bonnie and her family, Bonnie's husband and several people who were victims of his crime are not happy to see him. His return soon brings unwanted tension around town, which soon culminates with Jenks being straggled in his motel room. Suspicion falls on Bonnie's husband who was fired from his job due to problems with the victim, whereupon they are later arrested by Metzger for the crime. Jessica is not convinced, as she believes Jenks' return to town may have been down to something concerning the bank robbery he committed. Guest stars: Claudia Christian, Don Galloway, Robert Lansing, Ron Masak, Kathleen Nolan, Andrew Prine, Abe Vigoda, Larry Wilcox
150	18	"Where Have You Gone, Billy Boy?"	John Llewellyn Moxey	Peter S. Fischer	March 17, 1991	23.9
Dennis Stanton (Keith Michell) visits Jessica in hopes of regaling her with his latest investigation in San Francisco concerning a missing ventriloquist dummy that led to murder. The case concerned the shy ventriloquist Elwood Perkins (Grant Shaud), who spoke better through his puppet and was a popular act for Kate Kelley (Georgia Brown), the cold and mean-spirited owner of the club at which he performed. When the puppet disappeared, Dennis began a search for it, but when he deduced it was hidden in the basement, he was not expecting to find Kelley's body in the process. The local police suspect Perkins murdered her, as the victim was unwilling to let him out of his contract for a gig in Las Vegas, but Dennis believes he was innocent, as Kelley was brutal with others at the club. Guest stars: Teri Copley, Leslie Easterbrook, Marty Ingels, Jim Metzler, Lyle Waggoner
151	19	"Thursday's Child"	Anthony Shaw	Robert Swanson	April 7, 1991	21.9
While away in the north-west of the country, Jessica finds herself approached by Nancy Landon (Vera Miles) requesting her help. The writer is shocked when the woman claims that her son Steve, a local architect, is being accused of setting alight a construction site belonging to local contractor Ben Olston. Jessica is shocked when Nancy claims that her son is the illegitimate child of the writer's late husband, but agrees to investigate regardless. Although she learns that Steve was refusing to take bribes from Olston to conceal the shoddy construction of the school, Jessica is convinced someone else was involved. But when Olston is murdered, she soon has to come to Nancy's aid when she is arrested for the crime. Guest stars: John Anderson, John Beck, Lindsay Frost, Alan Fudge, Richard Gilliland, Paul Gleason, Martin Milner, Jennifer Warren
152	20	"Murder, Plain & Simple"	Vincent McEveety	Chris Manheim	April 28, 1991	23.7
In Pennsylvania, Jessica travels to an Amish country to find a present for her nephew, accompanied by her publisher's liaison Reuben Stoltz (Hunt Block). Upon their arrival, the pair find themselves stranded after a minor car accident, whereupon the writer is surprised to learn Stoltz was part of the Amish community but had left due to his deep animosity against one of the Amish elders, Jacob Beiler. The day after their arrival, Beiler is found murdered in a field, having been made up to look like a scarecrow. Stoltz becomes accused for the crime, though Jessica is not certain of the local sheriff's theory. She soon learns that the victim was killed in a nearby barn with a pitchfork, and question his reasons for being there in the first place. Guest stars: Martha Byrne, John Ireland, Jay Robinson, Jennifer Runyon, Michael Sarrazin
153	21	"Tainted Lady"	Vincent McEveety	Robert Van Scoyk	May 5, 1991	22.6
Ellen Wicker (Dee Wallace Stone) returns to old hometown of Dry Wells, California, to operate a new diner, but soon faces problems when two of her regulars die suddenly. When the local sheriff, whom she despises for his lecherous behaviour with her before, arrests her for poisoning the men, Ellen finds herself facing abuse from distrusting locals. Jessica soon arrives in town to help out, having previous proved her innocence in a murder investigation in Boston. The mystery writer questions the two deaths, believing there is more behind them, but then the matter is complicated when another of Ellen's regulars dies after visiting her, having been poisoned themselves. With her friend facing trouble, Jessica swiftly works to get to the bottom of things. Guest stars: Marshall Colt, Mary Crosby, Nina Foch, Sam Freed, Jack Kruschen, Gary Lockwood, Don Swayze
154	22	"The Skinny According to Nick Cullhane"	Walter Grauman	Tom B. Sawyer	May 12, 1991	19.0
Struggling author Nick Cullhane is facing problems in Boston, but arrives in Cabot Cove to see Jessica, desperately seeking to reclaim a manuscript he wrote and sent to her, as both parties want it. The mystery writer is puzzled about this, since she doesn't have it, until Harry McGraw turns up with instructions to track both Cullhane and the manuscript. When the writer himself is murdered, Jessica and Harry suspect he was killed because of what he wrote, and have to bring Metzger up to date on the situation. The group soon discover that Cullhane's manuscript concerned a faked kidnapping several years ago by three men from the brewery, who are now desperate to conceal their actions from being exposed. Guest stars: Leslie Easterbrook, Pat Harrington Jr., Alex Hyde-White, Tony Lo Bianco, Michael McGrady, Jameson Parker

=== Season 8 (1991–92) ===
No. overall	No. in season	Title	Directed by	Written by	Original release date	U.S. viewers (millions)
155	1	"Bite the Big Apple"	David Moessinger	David Moessinger	September 15, 1991	22.8
Jessica receives a teaching position in New York, and so acquires herself an apartment to save her the trouble of travelling back and forth from Cabot Cove. Her purchase soon brings her into a new mystery when its former tenant, Mike Freelander, is murdered and the apartment ransacked after she moves in. Joined by Seth, who came to check in on her, she soon learns that the victim acted strangely on the day of his death, and soon learns he may have been involved in smuggling contraband. While the lead detective on the case is not willing to let her investigate, Jessica is determined to discover what happened, especially when Freelander's brother and business partner is later murdered, and she discovers the motive behind the crime. Guest stars: Jay Acovone, John Considine, Alan Feinstein, Rosemary Forsyth, Eugene Roche, Liz Sheridan
156	2	"Night Fears"	Anthony Shaw	J. Michael Straczynski	September 22, 1991	23.4
Preparing to teach a course on criminology at Manhattan University, Jessica is annoyed when the course's previous teacher (Wings Hauser) challenges her to identify the mugger behind a spate of muggings around campus. However, she is forced to investigate when the latest target is fatally shot, shortly after learning she was hired as part of a recruiting stunt. Teaming up with Officer Kevin Bryce, a student who aspires to follow after his late father, Jessica is soon puzzled when bizarre messages turn up around campus, making it seem like the mugger is mentally unsound. But beneath the complexities that begin emerging, both she and Bryce soon discover there is a simple solution behind the situation, when they discover something off with a piece of evidence. Guest stars: Tim Choate, Bobby Hosea, John Lavachielli, Alan Oppenheimer, Roxie Roker, Julie St. Claire
157	3	"Unauthorized Obituary"	Walter Grauman	Robert E. Swanson	September 29, 1991	23.9
Biographer Jane Dawson (Jessica Walter) has a reputation for publishing books that cause scandals for the subjects she researches, something that Jessica dislikes. Both Jessica and her friend Arthur Brent are unhappy that Dawson intends to write a new book about Brent's wife, a movie actress who has become reclusive due to health issues. When the biographer is found dead in her tub, having been electrocuted, Brent finds himself under suspicion as both the victim's husband and sister saw him within the house before the body was found. Jessica decides to investigate, believing something is not right and that her friend is being framed. She soon learns that Dawson was a woman with a mysterious past, and that she was making big plans for the future. Guest stars: Barbara Bain, Sam Behrens, Bradford Dillman, Cathy Podewell, David Spielberg, Andrea Thompson
158	4	"Thicker Than Water"	Anthony Shaw	Larry DiTillio	October 6, 1991	24.2
Sheriff Metzger (Ron Masak) is shocked when his brother Wayne turns up in Cabot Cove without warning, after the pair became estranged following their father's death. Reluctant to help him, Metzger secures him work with local fisherman Zach Franklin (Pat Hingle) who needs a deckhand for his fishing vessel. Wayne discovers his new employer has problems but soon finds himself in trouble when Franklin disappears while they were out at sea. All signs point to a struggle aboard the vessel, with Metzger fearing his brother was involved, though Jessica is not convinced. When the vessel's co-owner is later murdered, Wayne is about to be framed for the crime but Jessica believes there is more behind the two separate events and questions the relationship between the two victims. Guest stars: Bruce Abbott, Luke Askew, Ted Markland, Marjorie Monaghan
159	5	"Lines of Excellence"	Walter Grauman	J. Michael Straczynski	November 3, 1991	23.5
Michael Rossari, an intelligent young man, offers to help Jessica find a new computer with a local firm he works for, after her typewriter breaks. The mystery writer soon finds herself drawn into a murder when Michael's boss, Alan Miller, is found dead moments before a class on computers is set to take place in the firm. Michael becomes the prime suspect when it transpires he had supplied the firm with stolen stock, but Jessica is convinced someone is framing him when a meeting she plans with him is somehow picked up by the police. Guest stars: Carmine Caridi, Charles Cyphers, Charles Frank, Alan Fudge, David Groh, Randee Heller, Conrad Janis, Karen Kondazian, Alan Oppenheimer
160	6	"Judge Not"	Chuck Bowman	Gerald DiPego	November 10, 1991	22.8
Visiting New Orleans to attend the funeral of John 'Daddy' Coop, a legendary blues musician, Jessica is shocked when she and Coop's widow come across the body of Coop's closest friend. Although the late musician's son, a police detective, advises her against investigating, Jessica decides to determine what happened when the widow receives threatening calls. She soon begins to suspect that it may be linked to a murder twenty years ago, involving Coop's former mistress, and soon begins to unravel a conspiracy behind the deaths. Guest stars: William Atherton, Randy Brooks, Olivia Cole, William Lucking, Logan Ramsey, Beah Richards
161	7	"Terminal Connection"	Walter Grauman	Robert Swanson	November 17, 1991	24.5
Novelist Ginny Blanchard is preparing for her fifth wedding anniversary with husband Clark, a prominent businessman. Jessica, visiting her old friend, finds herself coming to Ginny's aid when Clark is later found murdered near the couple's beachfront property. Police soon suspect Ginny was involved, as she was abused by her husband whenever he was drunk. However, Jessica is not convinced she is guilty as she attempts to piece together what happened, learning that Clark had several enemies, some of whom hated him deeply for the way he treated them. Guest stars: Douglas Barr, Chad Everett, Kerrie Keane, Lois Nettleton, Jameson Parker, Lisa Pelikan
162	8	"A Killing in Vegas"	Anthony Shaw	Bruce Lansbury	November 24, 1991	24.4
Jessica visits her friend's daughter in Las Vegas and tries to prove the woman's boyfriend innocent of murder. Guest stars: Jeff Kaake, Andreas Katsulas, Howard Keel, Stephen Macht, Amy O'Neill, Richard Portnow, Shelley Smith, David Soul
163	9	"The Committee"	Jerry Jameson	J. Michael Straczynski	December 1, 1991	25.5
A member of a prestigious committee faces disciplinary action for alleged misconduct, but is murdered before his punishment can be enforced, and Jessica must step in when the other members' suspicions pit them against one another. Guest stars: Robin Dearden, John Kapelos, Norman Lloyd, John McMartin, Nicholas Pryor, Robin Thomas, Edward Winter, George Wyner, Darrell Zwerling
164	10	"The List of Yuri Lermentov"	Anthony Shaw	Tom B. Sawyer	December 15, 1991	23.0
Jessica investigates the murder of a Russian author and the theft of his latest manuscript. Guest stars: Richard Beymer, Theodore Bikel, Spiros Focas, Louis Giambalvo, Janet Julian, Brian McNamara, Mitchell Ryan
165	11	"Danse Diabolique"	Alexander Singer	Jo William Philipp	January 5, 1992	27.7
Jessica attends a ballet rehearsal, but all the dancers are in grave danger when someone cuts a rope with a stage decoration and the lead ballerina is later found murdered. Guest stars: Adrian Paul, Robert Torti, Stephen Nichols, Marisa Berenson, Ernie Lively, Daniel Pilon, Nancy Valen
166	12	"The Witch's Curse"	Jerry Jameson	Tracy Friedman	January 12, 1992	28.1
A newcomer (Mary Crosby) to Cabot Cove gets the lead role in the community play, as a woman accused of witchcraft in the 1600s. But the aspiring actress is subsequently suspected of being the real thing, and is eventually framed for murdering a judge, who was also the magistrate in the play. Guest stars: David Ackroyd, Marian Mercer, Ed Nelson, Marian Seldes, Robert Vaughn
167	13	"Incident in Lot 7"	Anthony Shaw	J. Michael Straczynski	January 19, 1992	27.1
Jessica investigates the murder of a Hollywood producer who had adapted one of her novels for his latest film. Guest stars: Jackie Gayle, Henry Gibson, Ron Glass, Michelle Johnson, Ron Leibman, Lar Park Lincoln, Paula Prentiss, Stuart Whitman
168	14	"The Monte Carlo Murders"	Jerry Jameson	Bruce Lansbury	February 2, 1992	23.9
Jessica travels to Monte Carlo to visit an old friend (Dina Merrill) whose son is accused of murder. Guest stars: Neill Barry, Patrick Bauchau, David Birney, Maryam d'Abo, Lise Hilboldt, Bo Hopkins, Ian Ogilvy
169	15	"Tinker, Tailor, Liar, Thief"	Peter Salim	Robert E. Swanson	March 1, 1992	23.3
A British double agent (Clement von Franckenstein) is found murdered soon after he meets Jessica. Guest stars: Lloyd Bochner, Guy Doleman, Trevor Eve, Sharon Maughan, Kim Braden, Derrick O'Connor, Nick Tate
170	16	"Ever After"	Anthony Shaw	Robert Van Scoyk	March 8, 1992	25.2
Jessica assists in the investigation of the murder of the wealthy husband of a soap opera actress. Guest stars: Marcia Cross, Marj Dusay, Kevin McCarthy, Michael McGrady, Kate Mulgrew, Tony Roberts, Mitchell Whitfield
171	17	"To the Last Will I Grapple with Thee"	Walter Grauman	J. Michael Straczynski	March 15, 1992	24.7
An Irish colleague (George Hearn) of Jessica's is accused of murdering his longtime rival. Guest stars: Cameron Dye, Cliff Gorman, John Karlen, Richard Lynch, Mark Rolston
172	18	"Programmed for Murder"	Jerry Jameson	Tom B. Sawyer	April 5, 1992	22.9
Seth is accused of malpractice when the CEO of Cabot Cove's computer company checks in for a blood transfusion but dies after receiving the wrong type, an outcome Jessica suspects is exactly what someone wanted. Guest stars: Hunt Block, Judith Chapman, Tony Fields, Boyd Gaines, Judith Hoag, Alex Hyde-White, Will Lyman
173	19	"Day of the Dead"	Anthony Shaw	Mark A. Burley	April 26, 1992	23.5
Jessica travels to Mexico for an archaeological dig and to investigate the theft of a historic mask from a local museum. Things take a turn during a Day of the Dead celebration when the mask is found on the corpse of a murdered drug lord. Guest stars: James Coburn, Ismael 'East' Carlo, Alex Colón, Miriam Colón, Grant Cramer, Kamala Lopez, Tomas Milian, Shelley Morrison, Gregory Sierra, Geno Silva
174	20	"Angel of Death"	Walter Grauman	Robert E. Swanson	May 3, 1992	23.1
A playwright mourning the loss of his wife is the target of an attack that instead kills his nephew. Guest stars: Stephen Bogardus, Doran Clark, Sondra Currie, Ken Kercheval, Maria Mayenzet, Darren McGavin, Austin Pendleton, Noble Willingham
175	21	"Badge of Honor"	David Moessinger	David Moessinger	May 10, 1992	21.0
Seth invites one of his old Army buddies (Gerald S. O'Loughlin) to visit Cabot Cove, but the ex-soldier is subsequently accused of murdering a yacht dealer (Cliff DeYoung). Guest stars: Tony Becker, Daniel Davis, Robert Lansing, Gail O'Grady, Pamela Susan Shoop, Douglas Rowe
176	22	"Murder on Madison Avenue"	Jerry Jameson	Bruce Lansbury	May 17, 1992	20.5
A toy factory executive (Barbara Babcock) is murdered after being chosen as the next CEO. Guest stars: Joel Fabiani, Hallie Foote, John Hillerman, Leo Rossi, Harley Venton, Caroline Williams, Danny Woodburn

=== Season 9 (1992–93) ===
No. overall	No. in season	Title	Directed by	Written by	Original release date	U.S. viewers (millions)
177	1	"Murder in Milan"	Anthony Shaw	Laurence Heath	September 20, 1992	24.6
Jessica attends the filming of a movie in Milan and investigates the murder of a ruthless producer (Susan Blakely). Guest stars: George Coe, Robert Desiderio, George DiCenzo, Paul Gleason, Robert Harper, Gary Kroeger, Leah Pinsent, Cesar Romero, Paul Ryan
178	2	"Family Secrets"	Walter Grauman	Robert Hamner	September 27, 1992	23.7
Jessica discovers a true-crime writer in one of her old students (Brian McNamara), who is investigating a 20-year-old murder in Cabot Cove for his next book. But when he is murdered, Jessica must find out what it was he uncovered, and who would kill to keep it quiet. Guest stars: David Newsom, Phyllis Thaxter, Richard Venture, Caroline Williams
179	3	"The Mole"	Peter Salim	Tom B. Sawyer	October 4, 1992	25.7
Jessica is kidnapped by a rogue CIA agent who mistook her for a spy in a smuggling ring, and his real target is murdered by the time he realizes his mistake. Guest stars: Joseph Bologna, Melinda Culea, Ken Howard, Francis Guinan, Lewis Smith
180	4	"The Wind Around the Tower"	Walter Grauman	J. Michael Straczynski	November 1, 1992	25.3
Jessica delves into an old legend linked to the murder of an Irish tycoon (Dakin Matthews). Guest stars: Michael Alldredge, Mark Lindsay Chapman, Shay Duffin, Shirley Anne Field, John Finnegan, George Hearn, Don Knight, Richard Riehle, Mark Rolston
181	5	"The Dead File"	Anthony Shaw	Tom B. Sawyer	November 15, 1992	23.7
Jessica has a bone to pick with a cartoonist (Harvey Fierstein) who used her as inspiration for the lead character in a scandalous cartoon strip. But the murder of one of his staff causes Jessica to wonder if she put the blame on the wrong person. Guest stars: Diana Bellamy, George Furth, Robin Gammell, Kris Kamm, Susan Kellermann, Patrick Macnee, Jon Polito, Mark Roberts
182	6	"Night of the Coyote"	Jerry Jameson	Mark A. Burley	November 22, 1992	27.7
In New Mexico, Jessica investigates a long ago stagecoach robbery, that may be connected to the murder of the owner (Steve Forrest) of an Old West tourist attraction. Guest stars: Frederick Coffin, Graham Greene, Mariette Hartley, James Stephens, Floyd Red Crow Westerman
183	7	"Sugar & Spice, Malice & Vice"	Vincent McEveety	Robert E. Swanson	November 29, 1992	27.6
Michael Haggerty (Len Cariou) seeks out Jessica's help when he is accused of murdering his daughter's sleazy fiance (Kevin Kilner). Guest stars: Donna Bullock, James Handy, Lenore Kasdorf, James Shigeta, Beau Starr, Kim Johnston Ulrich, Efrem Zimbalist Jr.
184	8	"The Classic Murder"	Vincent McEveety	Robert Van Scoyk	December 6, 1992	23.8
A psychic (Natalia Nogulich) claims she foresaw the murder of a millionaire, but ends up murdered herself. Guest stars: John D'Aquino, Michael E. Knight, Louise Latham, John Rubinstein, Rita Taggart, Wayne Tippit, Jessica Tuck
185	9	"A Christmas Secret"	Anthony Shaw	Bruce Lansbury	December 13, 1992	27.9
Christmas in Cabot Cove is even more holly-jolly when a hardware tycoon's daughter gets engaged, but when the groom (Sean O'Bryan) is accused of attempted murder, several other things from his past come to light. Guest stars: Diane Baker, Corinne Bohrer, Amy Brenneman, Sean O'Bryan, Eileen Seeley, Larry Wilcox
186	10	"The Sound of Murder"	Anthony Shaw	Bruce Lansbury	January 3, 1993	30.1
The making of a music video is disrupted by the murder of a record producer. Guest stars: Richard Beymer, Edd Byrnes, Mary Beth Evans, Robert Knepper, Miles O'Keeffe, Alexia Robinson, Michael Tolan, Danny Woodburn
187	11	"Final Curtain"	Walter Grauman	J. Michael Straczynski	January 10, 1993	30.7
An actor friend of Seth's comes out of retirement to star in a new play, but the murder of his former manager puts the production on hold. Guest stars: Dennis Christopher, Keene Curtis, Bradford Dillman, Peter Donat
188	12	"Double Jeopardy"	Anthony Shaw	Laurence Heath	January 17, 1993	28.0
One of Jessica's writing students is framed for murdering a crime boss, whom the police had just found evidence proving he killed the student's father - after he was tried and acquitted. Guest stars: Robert Beltran, Ismael 'East' Carlo, Julius Carry, Raymond Cruz, Rosanna DeSoto, Dan Ferro
189	13	"Dead Eye"	Jerry Jameson	Tom B. Sawyer	February 7, 1993	26.0
Jessica uncovers several photos linked to the JFK assassination, which also hold the key to a more recent murder. Guest stars: Lonny Chapman, Julian Christopher, Ben Masters, Stewart Moss, Linda Purl, Al Ruscio
190	14	"Killer Radio"	Peter Salim	Carlton Hollander	February 14, 1993	27.9
A local radio station gets a new, state-of-the-art transmission tower, with the owner (Lyman Ward)'s corpse as a last-minute accessory. Guest stars: Stephen Caffrey, Lindsay Crouse, Georgia Emelin, Harry Guardino, William Lucking, Jeff Yagher
191	15	"The Petrified Florist"	Anthony Shaw	Donald Ross	February 21, 1993	29.1
Jessica imagines the plot for her next book, in which a magazine publisher (Penny Fuller) is accused of murdering a florist (Gary Beach). Guest stars: Sandahl Bergman, John Gabriel, Richard Herd, Sally Kellerman, Denise Miller, Taylor Nichols, Elmarie Wendel
192	16	"Threshold of Fear"	Vincent McEveety	James L. Novack	February 28, 1993	28.4
Jessica helps a neighbor in her New York building who has a phobia about leaving her apartment since she saw her mother murdered five years ago. Guest stars: Eddie Barth, Andrew Bloch, Margot Kidder, Cynthia Nixon, Jamie Rose, David Soul, Michael Zelniker
193	17	"The Big Kill"	Jerry Jameson	Mark A. Burley	March 7, 1993	25.6
Jessica uncovers a smuggling operation linked to the murder of a banker. Guest stars: Michael Beck, Chad Everett, Gregg Henry, Hope Lange, Lyle Waggoner, Don Stroud, Sandy Ward
194	18	"Dead to Rights"	Anthony Shaw	Tom B. Sawyer	March 21, 1993	27.1
Jessica agrees to help clear a former research assistant (Molly Hagan) of killing her new employer, despite the fact that the woman is a pathological liar. Guest stars: Sam Anderson, Christine Belford, Stephen T. Kay, Evelyn Keyes, Wallace Langham, Richard Libertini, Jeffrey Nordling, Edward Winter
195	19	"Lone Witness"	Walter Grauman	Maryanne Kasica and Michael Scheff	April 4, 1993	24.4
A delivery boy (Neil Patrick Harris) is the only witness to a customer's murder. Guest stars: Beth Howland, Laurence Luckinbill, Sheila MacRae, Joe Maruzzo, John Bennett Perry, Kario Salem, Raymond Serra, Liz Vassey
196	20	"Ship of Thieves"	Anthony Shaw	Bruce Lansbury	May 2, 1993	24.9
Jessica and Dennis Stanton (Keith Michell)'s cruise is thrown off course by a murder. Guest stars: Dwier Brown, Jon Cypher, Michelle Johnson, Lee Meriwether, Albie Selznick, Jane Withers
197	21	"The Survivor"	Anthony Shaw	Robert Van Scoyk	May 9, 1993	22.0
One of Jessica's friends is attacked after witnessing the murder of her boyfriend, a rookie undercover police officer, and Jessica teams up with the victim's hard-boiled superior (Stan Shaw) to uncover the truth. Guest stars: Ned Bellamy, Wolfgang Bodison, Don Calfa, Kasi Lemmons, Monte Markham, Julio Oscar Mechoso, Ed O'Ross, Nancy Sorel, Glenn Taranto
198	22	"Love's Deadly Desire"	Robert M. Wiliams Jr.	Chris Manheim	May 16, 1993	24.2
A romance novelist (Carroll Baker)'s life is under threat which eventually leads to the murder of her assistant. Guest stars: David Gail, William Katt, Christopher Murray, Andrea Roth, Yvonne Suhor, B.J. Ward

=== Season 10 (1993–94) ===
No. overall	No. in season	Title	Directed by	Written by	Original release date	U.S. viewers (millions)
199	1	"A Death in Hong Kong"	Vincent McEveety	Laurence Heath	September 12, 1993	18.7
Jessica travels to Hong Kong to visit her friend, a Chinese ceramic artist, and the wife of an American businessman negotiating a merger. However, Jessica's friend is briefly kidnapped, and although she returns safe and sound, she ends up the prime suspect when her husband is fatally poisoned during a party. Guest stars: Teri Austin, Barrie Ingham, Dustin Nguyen, France Nuyen, Soon-Tek Oh, David Warner, Vivian Wu
200	2	"For Whom the Ball Tolls"	Anthony Shaw	Donald Ross	September 26, 1993	24.2
Jessica's editor is accused of an attempt on the life of a property developer which instead killed his brother. Guest stars: Ray Abruzzo, Jeff Conaway, Hallie Foote, Kevin Kilner, Robert Pine, Susan Walters
201	3	"The Legacy of Borbey House"	Walter Grauman	Danna Doyle & Debbie Smith	October 3, 1993	22.2
An occultist/author is in Cabot Cove to research an infamous house and its history for a book. He also believes the house's current inhabitant, a mysterious man, is a vampire, which works against him when the home owner is later murdered with a stake in his heart. However, the murder may be related to a local woman who has been missing for months. Guest stars: David Birney, Roy Dotrice, Richard Gilliland, Gary Hershberger, Judith Jones, Christopher Neame, Lawrence Pressman, Barbara Townsend
202	4	"The Phantom Killer"	Anthony Shaw	Tom B. Sawyer	October 24, 1993	21.3
A ruthless magazine publisher is electrocuted in his bathtub, and the prime suspect is a reporter who worked for a rival tabloid. Guest stars: Vanessa Angel, Janet Julian, David Kriegel, Reiner Schöne, Alan Thicke, Scott Valentine, Emily Warfield
203	5	"A Virtual Murder"	Lee Smith	Carlton Hollander	October 31, 1993	22.4
The successful release of a virtual reality game based on one of Jessica's books is short-lived when it coincides with the murder of the lead designer. Guest stars: Julia Campbell, Kate McNeil, Allan Miller, Phil Morris, Shawn Phelan, Kevin Sorbo, Danny Woodburn, Richard Yniguez
204	6	"Bloodlines"	Don Mischer	Story by : Michael Berlin & Eric Estrin; Teleplay by : Robert Hamner	November 7, 1993	21.4
A thoroughbred trainer (Mickey Rooney) is murdered just as he's about to expose a racetrack scandal. Guest stars: Ami Dolenz, Blake Gibbons, Tippi Hedren, Stephen Macht, Don Murray, Sean O'Bryan, Shawnee Smith, Don Swayze
205	7	"A Killing in Cork"	Anthony Shaw	Bruce Lansbury	November 21, 1993	27.0
Jessica visits an Irish friend (Fionnula Flanagan) whose son is accused of murdering one of their American relatives (Andrew Robinson). Guest stars: Wendy Benson, Gordon Currie, Dakin Matthews, Gerald S. O'Loughlin, Cyril O'Reilly, Donnelly Rhodes, Mark Rolston, Bridgette Wilson
206	8	"Love & Hate in Cabot Cove"	Anthony Shaw	Robert Van Scoyk	November 28, 1993	25.0
Jessica's accountant struggles to conceal his gambling habit and is framed for murdering a sheriff's deputy who was in love with his daughter. Guest stars: Richard Beymer, Wings Hauser, Carrie Snodgress, Liz Vassey, Penelope Windust
207	9	"Murder at a Discount"	Walter Grauman	Rick Mittleman	December 5, 1993	25.7
Jessica's latest novel causes uproar when it resembles a case where a video store owner (George Segal) was accused of murdering his wife 5 years earlier. As a result, the man sues Jessica, only to end up murdered as well. Guest stars: Sam Anderson, John Enos III, Morgan Fairchild, Spencer Garrett, Elaine Joyce, Julianna Margulies, Sandy Ward
208	10	"Murder in White"	Vincent McEveety	Lawrence Vail	December 19, 1993	22.0
Jessica's actress friend stars in a play based on one of Jessica's novels, but is accused of murdering a sponsor. Guest stars: Pauline Brailsford, Davis Gaines, Norman Lloyd, Jean Marsh, Anne Meara, Ian Ogilvy, Michael Palance, Dedee Pfeiffer, Jim Piddock, Robin Sachs
209	11	"Northern Explosion"	Anthony Shaw	Mark A. Burley	January 2, 1994	25.0
Jessica is laid over in Canada en route to a wedding, and investigates two murders connected to a mining dispute. Guest stars: Ana Alicia, Alan Fudge, Graham Greene, Jerry Hardin, Ernie Lively
210	12	"Proof in the Pudding"	Jerry Jameson	Lisa Seidman	January 9, 1994	26.5
Jessica guest stars on a TV cooking show hosted by a famous chef (John Saxon) who is murdered shortly after opening his new restaurant, and one of Jessica's friends is accused of the crime. Guest stars: Fran Bennett, Michael Brandon, Nick Corri, Bobby Di Cicco, Tony Lo Bianco, Liza Snyder, Heidi Swedberg, Valerie Wildman
211	13	"Portrait of Death"	Vincent McEveety	Donald Ross	January 16, 1994	27.4
Jessica's friend (Loretta Swit) makes a statue for an art exhibition that is subsequently used to kill the gallery owner. Guest stars: David Ackroyd, Edward Hibbert, Taylor Nichols, Lee Purcell, Diane Salinger, Kristoffer Tabori
212	14	"Deadly Assets"	Anthony Shaw	Tom B. Sawyer	January 23, 1994	29.7
Jessica's old friend Charlie Garrett comes to Cabot Cove and helps her investigate the murder of a hitman. Guest stars: R.D. Call, Frederick Coffin, Anthony Mangano, Matt Mulhern
213	15	"Murder on the Thirtieth Floor"	Walter Grauman	Robert Van Scoyk	February 6, 1994	26.5
Jessica's recently widowed editor (Robert Desiderio) who apparently committed suicide, leaves behind some things that cause Jessica to suspect foul play. Guest stars: Jay Acovone, Dennis Boutsikaris, Robert Curtis Brown, Lisa Darr, Lisa Wilcox, Michael Zelniker
214	16	"Time to Die"	Anthony Shaw	Laurence Heath	March 6, 1994	25.5
Jessica's teen writing class has two promising students, Alida and Chris. But when Chris' loan-shark stepfather turns up dead after pursuing Alida and fleeing a hit-and-run, Chris is the prime suspect. Guest stars: Robert Beltran, Marta DuBois, Janet MacLachlan, Rudy Ramos, Stan Shaw
215	17	"The Dying Game"	Jerry Jameson	Bruce Lansbury	March 13, 1994	25.7
Jessica has worked to have Larkins sold to a museum, but an embezzled pension plan leads to a rival bid and murder. Guest stars: Peter Donat, Joel Fabiani, Mimi Kuzyk, Andy Lauer, Martin Milner, Kate Mulgrew, Michael Tolan, Musetta Vander, Harley Venton
216	18	"The Trouble with Seth"	Anthony Shaw	Tom B. Sawyer	March 27, 1994	26.5
Seth mysteriously disappears, and an assassin is murdered in his office while he's away. Guest stars: Katherine Cannon, Ann Hearn, Paul Mantee, Ben Masters, Ethan Embry, Kim Johnston Ulrich, Jay Underwood
217	19	"Roadkill"	Walter Grauman	Mark A. Burley	May 1, 1994	23.2
Jessica visits the owner (Earl Holliman) of a failing trucking company, whose son (Patrick Cassidy) is accused of the vehicular homicide of his girlfriend's (Melora Hardin) blackmailing ex-husband. Guest stars: Dirk Blocker, Joanna Cassidy, Beth Grant, Whip Hubley, Gary Lockwood, Robert O'Reilly, Brett Porter, Reni Santoni
218	20	"A Murderous Muse"	Anthony Shaw	Bruce Lansbury	May 15, 1994	19.8
Jessica searches for the truth when a legendary maestro is found murdered and an innocent man is charged with the crime. Guest stars: Eddie Barth, Pamela Bellwood, Ronald Guttman, Joseph Kell, Robert Knepper, Jenny Lewis, Jon Polito, Craig Wasson
219	21	"Wheel of Death"	Walter Grauman	Robert Van Scoyk	May 22, 1994	19.2
A carnival comes to Cabot Cove in the midst of several burglaries, but doesn't seem to make very much money. Things only get worse when a married couple employed by the carnival are accused of murdering the troupe leader (Bradford Dillman), and the woman turns out to be Sheriff Metzger's ex-girlfriend. Guest stars: Thom Bierdz, Maria Canals, Judson Mills, Cindy Pickett, Charles Siebert

=== Season 11 (1994–95) ===
No. overall	No. in season	Title	Directed by	Written by	Original release date	U.S. viewers (millions)
220	1	"A Nest of Vipers"	Anthony Shaw	Rick Mittleman	September 25, 1994	23.4
Jessica is for a wild time when she visits the Los Angeles Animal Park to do research for her new book and ends up investigating the murder of a self-proclaimed anti-zoo activist who was bitten by a large poisonous snake. Guest stars: David Beecroft, Susan Blakely, Corinne Bohrer, Lisa Darr, John Dye, Jerry Hardin, Taylor Nichols, Glenn Taranto
221	2	"Amsterdam Kill"	Jerry Jameson	Jerry Ludwig	October 2, 1994	23.1
The best-laid travel plans go seriously awry when Jessica puts her holiday in Amsterdam on hold in order to look into the disappearance of a friend and, shockingly, becomes the main suspect in an even more serious crime. Guest stars: Theodore Bikel, Cliff Emmich, Marcus Gilbert, Leann Hunley, Richard Lynch, Joseph Maher, Albie Selznick, Camilla Søeberg, Richard Young
222	3	"To Kill a Legend"	Anthony Shaw	David Bennett Carren & J. Larry Carroll	October 9, 1994	20.7
A documentary film about a Cabot Cove Legend becomes more of a suspense-thriller when the director is killed and Jessica is forced to seek clues frame by frame. Guest stars: Greg Cruttwell, Alan Fudge, Molly Hagan, Anthony Heald, Judith Hoag, Jeffrey Nordling, Gail Strickland
223	4	"Death in Hawaii"	Don Mischer	Laurence Heath	October 16, 1994	23.9
Jessica's Hawaiian vacation to visit a power broker friend (Ken Howard) is interrupted when there's trouble in paradise as his family becomes involved in a political feud, which escalates into accusations of money laundering and, ultimately, the murder of his gardener. Guest stars: Nina Foch, Tom Hallick, Ted Henning, James F. Kelly, Robert Duncan McNeill, Steve Park, Tamlyn Tomita
224	5	"Dear Deadly"	Anthony Shaw	Donald Ross	October 23, 1994	23.9
Nothing's black-and-white when Jessica investigates the sudden death of a San Francisco Union love and marriage columnist who met an abrupt ending none of her readers could have predicted. Guest stars: Daphne Ashbrook, Casey Biggs, Eileen Brennan, Kristen Cloke, John Rhys-Davies, Rosanna Huffman, Laurence Luckinbill
225	6	"The Murder Channel"	Walter Grauman	Jerry Ludwig	November 6, 1994	21.2
A birthday present of free cable TV ends up being more trouble than it's worth when Jessica's neighbor witnesses an on-camera murder of a jeweler's wife (Jessica Walter), and Jessica's investigation of the crime leads to a potential diamond robbery. Guest stars: John Capodice, Dan Ferro, Charles Hallahan, Gary Hershberger, Aaron Lustig, Perrey Reeves, Doris Roberts
226	7	"Fatal Paradise"	Jerry Jameson	Tom B. Sawyer	November 13, 1994	25.0
During a break in Martinique, Jessica graciously comes to the aid of a private investigator who is accused of killing the woman (Cassie Yates) he was tracking on the tropical island. Guest stars: Christopher Allport, Patricia Barry, Michael Callan, Rodney Eastman, Cynthia Harris, Anne Lockhart, Stephen Meadows, Marie-Alise Recasner, Maurice Roëves
227	8	"Crimson Harvest"	Anthony Shaw	Bruce Lansbury	November 20, 1994	22.6
With the fate of a struggling winery handing in the balance, Jessica looks into two brutal deaths in beautiful Sonoma and finds help in the form of a telepathic dog and an unusual cellarman. Guest stars: Joseph Cali, Ismael 'East' Carlo, Elizabeth Gracen, Gregg Henry, Lainie Kazan, David Newsom, Robert Pine, Eddie Velez
228	9	"Murder by Twos"	Anthony Shaw	Bruce Lansbury	November 27, 1994	24.8
Secrets and lies are exposed when Cabot Cove's bullying town barber is found electrocuted in his garage and the high school teacher who was his clandestine lover appears to subsequently commit suicide. Guest stars: Bibi Besch, Ben Browder, Claire Malis Callaway, Thomas Callaway, Lise Cutter, Troy Evans, Chris Mulkey, Douglas Roberts, Vinessa Shaw, Jennifer Warren
229	10	"Murder of the Month Club"	Walter Grauman	Donald Ross	December 4, 1994	20.2
It's a case of publish or perish when Jessica must prove that a hard-drinking fellow mystery writer, who hasn't produced a book in years, is not responsible for a brutal crime. Guest stars: Jeff Conaway, George DiCenzo, Patrick Fabian, Kerri Green, Gale Hansen, Ian Ogilvy, Cec Verrell, Gwynyth Walsh, Anthony Zerbe
230	11	"An Egg to Die For"	Robert M. Williams, Jr.	Maryanne Kasica & Michael Scheff	December 11, 1994	20.9
A book fair in Florida becomes the backdrop for a case of international intrigue when Jessica and a mysterious Russian detective (David Ogden Stiers) investigate the strange link between a stolen Faberge egg and the murder of the father (Andrew Robinson) of one of the show attendees. Guest stars: Kaitlin Hopkins, Allan Miller, Cyril O'Reilly, James Stephens
231	12	"The Scent of Murder"	Anthony Shaw	Laurence Heath	January 8, 1995	24.5
Jessica's friend Dr. Seth Hazlitt takes her to visit his wealthy cousin's plantation, but the trip takes an unexpected turn when their host is killed and the doctor becomes co-owner of the estate with the victim's young fiancee. Guest stars: David Byron, Ann Cusack, Robert Hooks, Sally Kirkland, Tom Mason, Dakin Matthews, Craig Richard Nelson, Melanie Smith
232	13	"Death 'N' Denial"	Jerry Jameson	Mark A. Burley	January 22, 1995	24.4
A trip to Cairo with a museum curator begins badly when Jessica's bag is stolen, and then takes a turn for the worse when a priceless relic also goes missing and the hard-boiled thief is murdered. Guest stars: Turhan Bey, Finn Carter, Michael Paul Chan, Steve Inwood, Chaim Jeraffi, Lee Meriwether, Eric Pierpoint, Jim Pirri, James Read, Jeri Ryan
233	14	"Murder in High 'C'"	Anthony Shaw	Jerry Ludwig	February 5, 1995	21.9
The passionate - and sometimes bizarre - world of Italian opera envelops Jessica when she works with an eccentric police inspector in Genoa, Italy, to catch the murderer of an opera company's manager. Guest stars: Bruce Abbott, Lorenzo Caccialanza, Charles Cioffi, Robert Costanzo, John Getz, Khrystyne Haje, Carol Lawrence, Pierrino Mascarino, Ely Pouget
234	15	"Twice Dead"	Walter Grauman	Paul Schiffer	February 12, 1995	23.8
The world believes that Jessica's scientist friend took his own life, but she knows that he really faked his death. When he actually does die at the hands of a killer, she works to set the record straight. Guest stars: Sam Anderson, Annie Corley, Robert Curtis Brown, Bradford Dillman, Richard Portnow, W. Morgan Sheppard, Shannon Tweed, Bruce Weitz
235	16	"Film Flam"	Anthony Shaw	Donald Ross	February 19, 1995	22.6
There's no business like show business, as Jessica learns when she travels to Hollywood to discuss a screen adaptation, but ends up on a case involving the deaths both of a movie memorabilia fanatic (John Astin) and a legendary director. Guest stars: James Caviezel, Mike Connors, Kim Darby, Stacy Edwards, Kerrie Keane, Richard Libertini, William O'Leary, Cali Timmins
236	17	"Murder A La Mode"	Jerry Jameson	Laurence Heath	February 26, 1995	25.1
Jessica meets some lowlifes in the world of high fashion when she visits Paris to help launch her novel and learns about a plot to assassinate the ruthless owner of slave-labor sweatshops. Guest stars: Clifford David, David Garrison, François-Eric Gendron, Daniel Markel, Natalia Nogulich, Yuji Okumoto
237	18	"The Dream Team"	Anthony Shaw	Tom B. Sawyer	March 19, 1995	20.0
Plans for a huge marina between Cabot Cove and neighboring town Craggy Neck turn deadly when the jilted wife of one of the developers drowns in her car off the waterfront. Guest stars: Katherine Cannon, Frank Converse, John D'Aquino, Mary Gordon Murray, Charles Napier, Yvette Nipar, Jay Patterson Note: Last appearance of Michael Horton as Grady Fletcher.
238	19	"School for Murder"	Vincent McEveety	Story by : Robert Brennan; Teleplay by : Robert Brennan & Jerry Ludwig	April 30, 1995	21.9
Beneath the serene surface of academia, Jessica discovers jealousy, bitterness and even murder when she delivers a creative-writing lecture at an exclusive Ivy League Prep school. Guest stars: Dana Barron, Roy Dotrice, Robert Foxworth, Scott Marlowe, Richard Minchenberg, Maryann Plunkett, Ethan Randall, Trevor St. John
239	20	"Another Killing in Cork"	Anthony Shaw	Bruce Lansbury	May 7, 1995	17.5
Jessica needs some luck o' the Irish when she visits the Emerald Isle and fights to stop a destructive mining conglomerate headed by a councilman who controls local politicians through bribery or even murder. Guest stars: Bairbre Dowling, Francis Guinan, Martin Jarvis, Ross Kettle, James Lancaster, Mark Rolston, Carolyn Seymour, Rod Taylor, Lyman Ward, Kent Williams, Amanda Wyss
240	21	"Game, Set, Murder"	Walter Grauman	Philip John Taylor	May 14, 1995	19.6
A US Open hopeful with a tragic past turns to Jessica for help when those close to her are killed and her tennis-pro lover is accused of the crimes. Guest stars: J.C. Brandy, Bobby Hosea, Joyce Hyser, Marta Martin, Iona Morris, Barry Newman, Alyson Reed, Leon Russom, Jonathan Scarfe

=== Season 12 (1995–96) ===
No. overall	No. in season	Title	Directed by	Written by	Original release date	U.S. viewers (millions)
241	1	"Nailed"	Anthony Shaw	Donald Ross	September 21, 1995	12.5
Beauty is only skin deep when a businessman (John O'Hurley) is stabbed to death with a famous hair stylist's scissors, and Jessica finds the culprit by following a string of ugly break-ins. Guest stars: Daphne Ashbrook, Rosalind Chao, Leslie Easterbrook, Sean O'Bryan, Wayne Péré, Vic Polizos
242	2	"A Quaking in Aspen"	Vincent McEveety	Tom B. Sawyer	September 28, 1995	12.9
While helping a friend launch a new TV show in Aspen, Jessica and investigator Charlie Garrett (Wayne Rogers) look into a mysterious death with a multi-million dollar payout. Guest stars: Wendy Benson, Thom Bierdz, Tom Everett, Kurt Fuller, Elizabeth Gracen, Deborah Lacey, Gerald McRaney, Leigh Taylor-Young, Scott Valentine
243	3	"The Secret of Gila Junction"	Anthony Shaw	Jerry Ludwig	October 5, 1995	13.3
Jessica finds that there's more than one secret buried in the desert sands surrounding the town of Gila Junction when the discovery of a strongbox filled with cash leads to murder. Guest stars: Lawrence Bayne, Guy Boyd, Dorothy Lyman, Robert Rusler, Douglas Roberts, Bo Svenson, Jay Underwood, Kari Whitman
244	4	"Big Easy Murder"	Vincent McEveety	Cynthia Deming & William Royce	October 12, 1995	12.4
Jessica gets wrapped up in the deadly world of New Orleans black magic when a voodoo doll is linked to a local turf war between rival supper-club owners. Guest stars: Elizabeth Ashley, Robert Forster, G.W. Bailey, Olivia Cole, Juliette Jeffers, Anne-Marie Johnson, Nick LaTour, Brian McNamara, Clifton Powell, Mitchell Ryan, Lewis Van Bergen
245	5	"Home Care"	Anthony Shaw	Robert Van Scoyck	October 19, 1995	13.2
Murder strikes close to home when a young nurse under suspicion of performing mercy killings becomes the primary care provider for Jessica's best friend, Maggie. Guest stars: Frances Bay, William Converse-Roberts, Megan Follows, Željko Ivanek, Audra Lindley, Ed Nelson, Stephanie Niznik, Tom O'Brien, Elizabeth Wilson
246	6	"Nan's Ghost: Part 1"	Anthony Shaw	Bruce Lansbury	November 2, 1995	13.7
A terrifying ghost story threatens to become all too real when Jessica investigates the killing of a healthy American in Ireland and his connections to a haunted castle. Guest stars: Leslie Bevis, Edita Brychta, Mark Lindsay Chapman, Fionnula Flanagan, Peter Jason, John Karlen, Ross Kettle, Thomas Kopache, Christopher Neame, Raphael Sbarge, Wendy Schaal, John Saint Ryan, Rod Taylor, James Warwick
247	7	"Nan's Ghost: Part 2"	Anthony Shaw	Bruce Lansbury	November 9, 1995	11.8
After narrowly escaping a harrowing demise in the castle dungeon, Jessica sets a trap to catch the perpetrators of a hoax who will stop at nothing to scare their victims to death.
248	8	"Shooting in Rome"	Vincent McEveety	Jerry Ludwig	November 16, 1995	12.6
Script rewrites on a film adaptation take a back seat when Jessica witnesses the fiery end of a stuntman during what should have been a routine car crash. Guest stars: Bruce Abbott, Lisa Banes, Lorenzo Caccialanza, Mike Connors, Louis Giambalvo, Sam Hennings, Allan Miller, Antony Ponzini, Ben Reed, Shawn Weatherly
249	9	"Deadly Bidding"	Anthony Shaw	Tom B. Sawyer	November 23, 1995	10.6
Jessica enters the high-stakes world of art smuggling when a stolen Degas shows up beneath a recently auctioned painting and an obscure painter is murdered that very night. Guest stars: Tyrees Allen, Edd Byrnes, Kathleen Garrett, Doug Hutchison, Aharon Ipalé, Martin Jarvis, Renée Jones, Paul Lieber, Craig Richard Nelson, Wayne Rogers, Melanie Smith
250	10	"Frozen Stiff"	Paul Lazarus	Mark A. Burley	November 30, 1995	13.3
Some people do get their just desserts, as Jessica discovers when she investigates an unpleasant ice cream company co-owner found on ice in the corporate freezer. Guest stars: Dirk Benedict, Christopher Curry, Kristen Dalton, Ann Hearn, Gregory Itzin, Christina Pickles Bill Smitrovich, George Wyner
251	11	"Unwilling Witness"	Anthony Shaw	Robert Van Scoyck	December 14, 1995	12.5
It's Jessica versus a federal grand jury when she's subpoenaed in the case of a corrupt investment firm and the only person who can clear her name turns up dead. Guest stars: Joel Brooks, Ron Dean, Lisa Eichhorn, Shea Farrell, Stan Ivar, Larry Linville, Janel Moloney, Sydney Walsh
252	12	"Kendo Killing"	Walter Grauman	Laurence Heath	January 4, 1996	15.2
When a traditional Japanese marriage contract is broken after the fiance is killed by a masked assailant, Jessica must decipher a politically charged love triangle in order to find the culprit. Guest stars: Pat Morita, Tom Wopat, George Kee Cheung, Maggie Han, Jim Ishida, Bruce Locke, Byron Mann, David Stratton, Vivian Wu
253	13	"Death Goes Double Platinum"	Anthony Shaw	Philip John Taylor	January 7, 1996	19.7
Jessica works to help an up-and-coming band land a recording deal, but the bass guitarist (Tony Plana) finds himself singing the blues when his sister is implicated in a murder. Guest stars: Jason Bernard, Robert Clohessy, Nick Corri, Rosanna DeSoto, Ramón Franco, David Labiosa, Jacqueline Obradors, Marco Sanchez, Amy Stock-Poynton
254	14	"Murder in Tempo"	Kevin Corcoran	Laurence Heath	January 11, 1996	14.8
A benefit concert to save Cabot Cove's Maine Woods from development goes distinctly off-key when a sniper takes aim at a celebrated young singer who is later electrocuted. Guest stars: Sam Anderson, Keith Coulouris, John D'Aquino, Amy Hathaway, Whip Hubley, Ernie Lively, John Livingston, Josh Taylor
255	15	"The Dark Side of the Door"	Anthony Shaw	James L. Novack	February 1, 1996	13.9
Jessica's friend Erin Garman (Tracy Middendorf) is haunted by having been kidnapped as a child. When Erin reads a novel with a story too close for coincidence, Jessica makes a shocking revelation. Guest stars: Richard Beymer, Meg Foster, Richard Libertini, Taylor Nichols, Gerry Bean, Marcia Strassman, Michael Tylo
256	16	"Murder Among Friends"	Vincent McEveety	Jerry Ludwig	February 8, 1996	12.9
It's lights, camera, murder when a powerful producer is killed the night before announcing which of the six stars of a hit series is going to be fired. Guest stars: Bill Brochtrup, Frederick Coffin, Robin Curtis, Cameron Dye, Terri Hanauer, Gary Hershberger, Allison Smith, John Terlesky
257	17	"Something Foul in Flappieville"	Anthony Shaw	Robert Van Scoyck	February 15, 1996	13.1
A child's toy becomes the murder weapon used to kill a security guard at a children's TV studio, and the only "suspect" is a puppet based on the character of a french poodle detective, whom Jessica created in a short story that became a TV show. Guest stars: Corinne Bohrer, Maryedith Burrell, Bryan Cranston, Alan Fudge, Kimberley Kates, Stephen T. Kay, Robert Knepper, Steven Martini, Dey Young
258	18	"Track of a Soldier"	Vincent McEveety	Bruce Lansbury	February 25, 1996	19.8
Jessica's visit with a friend running for senator is disrupted by the arrival of a man who threatens to reveal some scandalous...and later is found knifed to death. Guest stars: Vaitiare Bandera, Brandon Douglas, Wings Hauser, Linda Kelsey, Audrey Landers, Fredric Lehne, Ben Lemon, Stephen Macht, James Victor, Michael Zelniker
259	19	"Evidence of Malice"	Anthony Shaw	Tom B. Sawyer	March 28, 1996	13.5
Deputy Andy turns to his old pal Jessica for help when he is accused of planting evidence and then framed for murder of his childhood rival. Guest stars: Stephanie Dunnam, Rick Lenz, Lawrence Monoson, Vyto Ruginis
260	20	"Southern Double-Cross"	Walter Grauman	Mark A. Burley	April 4, 1996	12.0
When she learns that she may inherit land in Australia, Jessica ventures down under and finds herself involved in a deadly clash between sheep owners and miners that ends in the murder of the mayor's son. Guest stars: Briony Behets, Donald Burton, Lisa Darr, Alastair Duncan, Sofie Formica, Spencer Garrett, Trevor Goddard, Nick Tate, Adam Wylie
261	21	"Race to Death"	Vincent McEveety	Story by : Peter Barwood and Laurence Heath; Teleplay by : Laurence Heath	April 28, 1996	16.7
A young skipper on a quest for the World Cup finds herself in hot water when her main competitor is found murdered, and Cabot Cove's Honorary Commodore Jessica works to solve the killing. Guest stars: Dwier Brown, Christopher Buchholz, Steve Forrest, John Getz, Kate Hodge, Martin Milner, Andrea Parker, Rick Rossovich, Ronne Troup
262	22	"What You Don't Know Can Kill You"	Kevin Corcoran	Robert Van Scoyck	May 5, 1996	16.0
The teenage landscape gardener redesigning Jessica's yard is killed when his motorcycle goes off the road, and his fiancee is convinced that his death was no accident. Guest stars: Anthony Michael Hall, Jerry Hardin, Laurie Holden, Bruce Kirby, Geoffrey Lewis, Judson Mills, Kathryn Morris
263	23	"Mrs. Parker's Revenge"	Anthony Shaw	Anne C. Collins	May 12, 1996	13.5
Jessica's trip to Georgia is anything but peachy when a hotel room mix-up gets her involved with a weapons broker looking to buy a vial of a deadly virus. Guest stars: Erick Avari, Gregg Henry, Mary Elizabeth McGlynn, William O'Leary, Tony Todd, Peter Van Norden, Gregory Alan Williams
264	24	"Death by Demographics"	Anthony Shaw	Donald Ross	May 19, 1996	16.5
This year's annual visit to San Francisco to participate in a "book-talk" radio show is very different for Jessica: the station has made drastic changes in its effort to reach more listeners...and the shock jock's manipulative manager has been killed. Guest stars: Diana Canova, Robert Curtis Brown, Paul Linke, Robert Pine, Robin Riker, David Ogden Stiers, Kenneth Tigar

== TV movies ==
Title	Directed by	Written by	Original release date	U.S. viewers (millions)
Murder, She Wrote: South by Southwest	Anthony Pullen Shaw	Peter S. Fischer, Richard Levinson & William Link	November 2, 1997	18.61
On her way to El Paso by train, Jessica is sidetracked, searching for a missing woman who witnessed the murder of a government whistleblower.
Murder, She Wrote: A Story to Die For	Anthony Pullen Shaw	J. Michael Straczynski	May 18, 2000	13.27
At a writer's conference, Jessica attempts to solve the murder of a Russian dissident who wrote a book that detailed the inner workings of the KGB.
Murder, She Wrote: The Last Free Man	Anthony Pullen Shaw	Matthew Sommer	May 2, 2001	11.32
Jessica investigates the mysterious details surrounding the death of a slave accused of murdering a white plantation owner in the 1850s.
Murder, She Wrote: The Celtic Riddle	Anthony Pullen Shaw	Rosemary Anne Sisson, Bruce Lansbury & Lyn Hamilton	May 9, 2003	10.69
Jessica travels to Ireland to attend the reading of an old friend's will and realizes that the will contains clues to the whereabouts of a secret treasure, as well as pointing to the real killer responsible for a series of murders.
