= 39th Golden Globe Awards =

Film award ceremony in 1982

- Date: January 30, 1982
- Site: Beverly Hilton Hotel; Beverly Hills, Los Angeles, California
- Hosted by: Robert Preston; Linda Gray

Highlights
- Best Film: Drama: On Golden Pond
- Best Film: Musical or Comedy: Arthur
- Best Drama Series: Hill Street Blues
- Best Musical or Comedy Series: M*A*S*H
- Most awards: (4) Arthur
- Most nominations: (7) Ragtime; Reds

The 39th Golden Globe Awards, honoring the best in film and television for 1981, were held on January 30, 1982.

== Winners and nominees ==
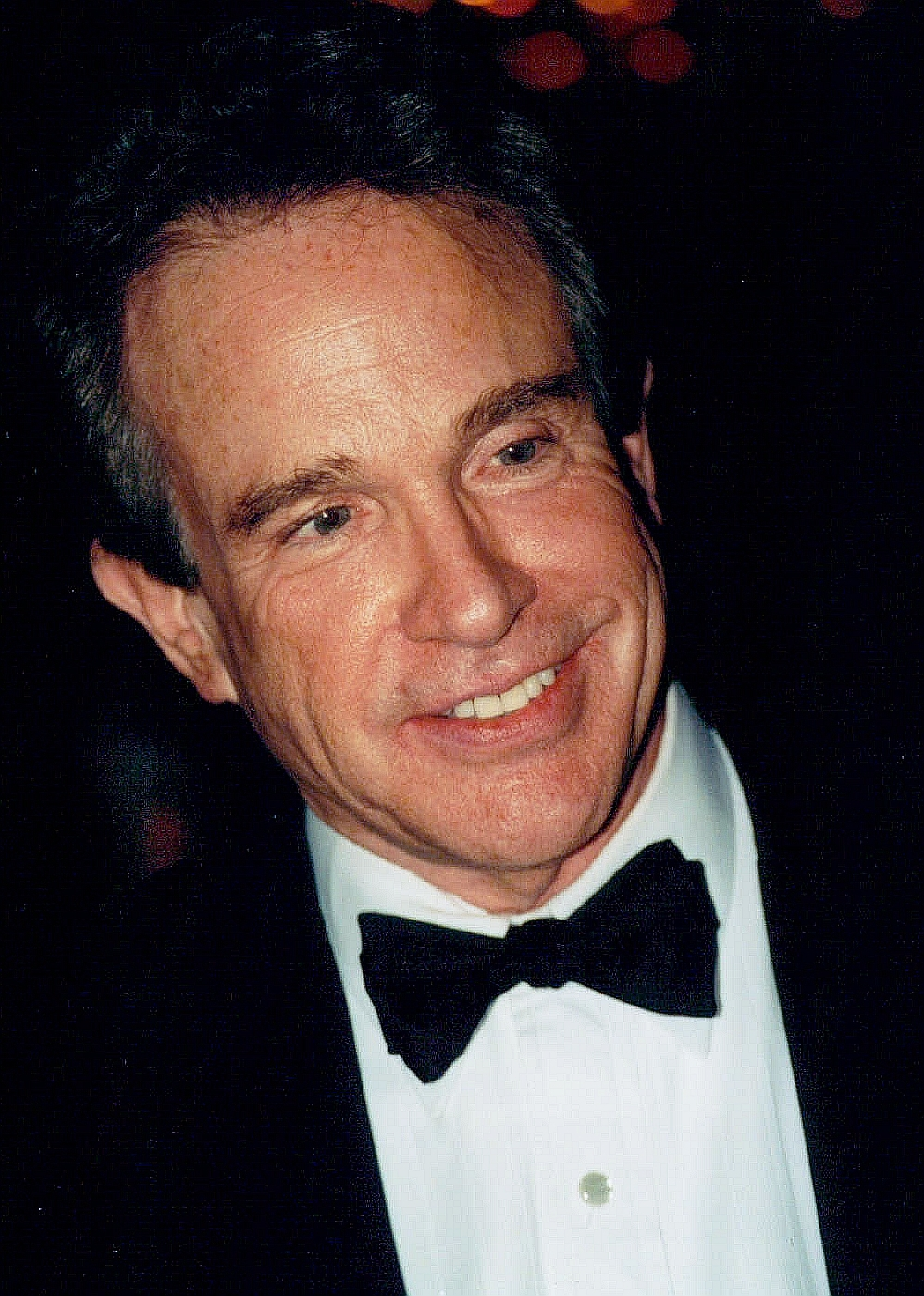
Warren Beatty — Best Director, winner

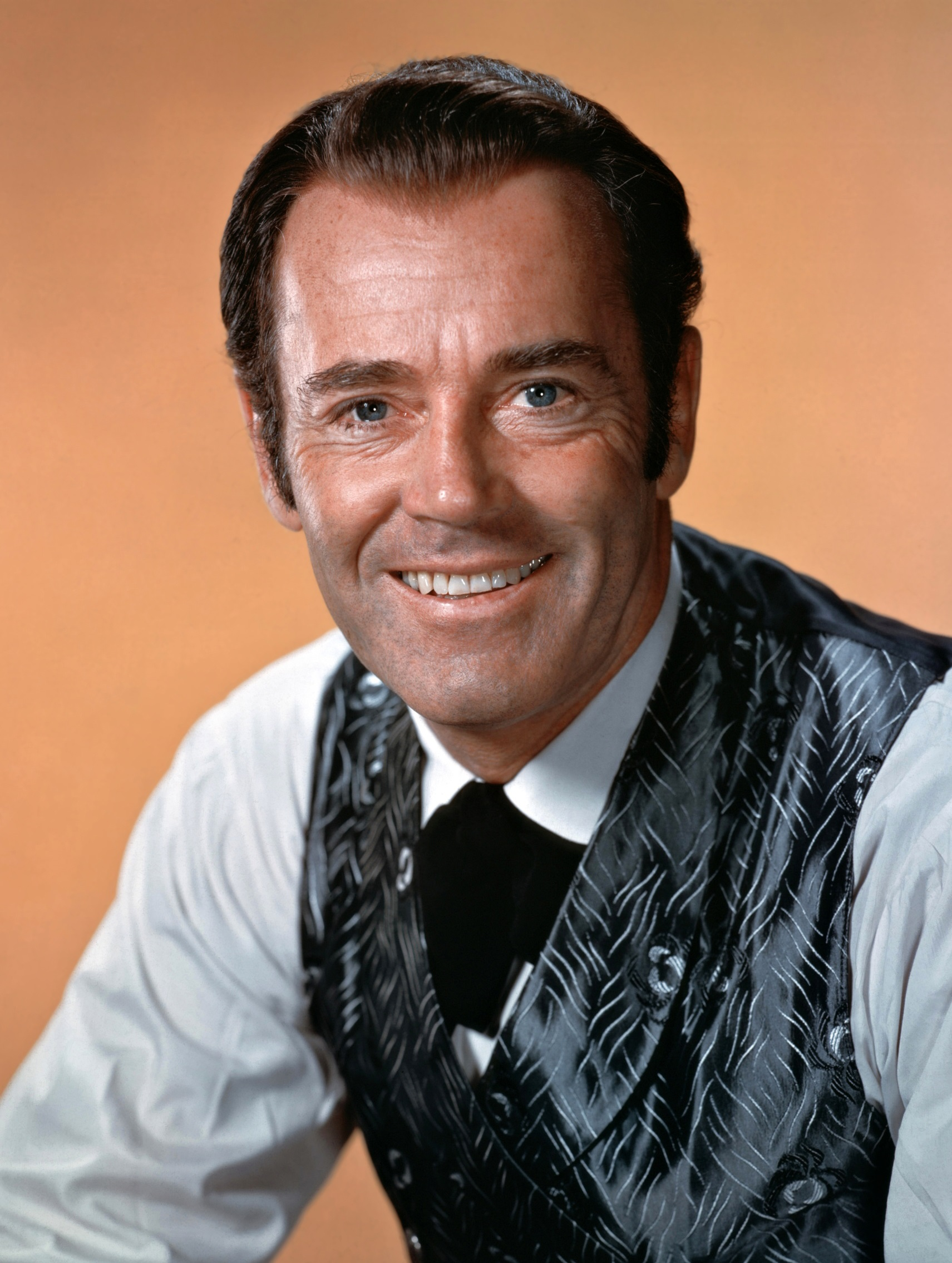
Henry Fonda — Best Actor in a Motion Picture, Drama winner

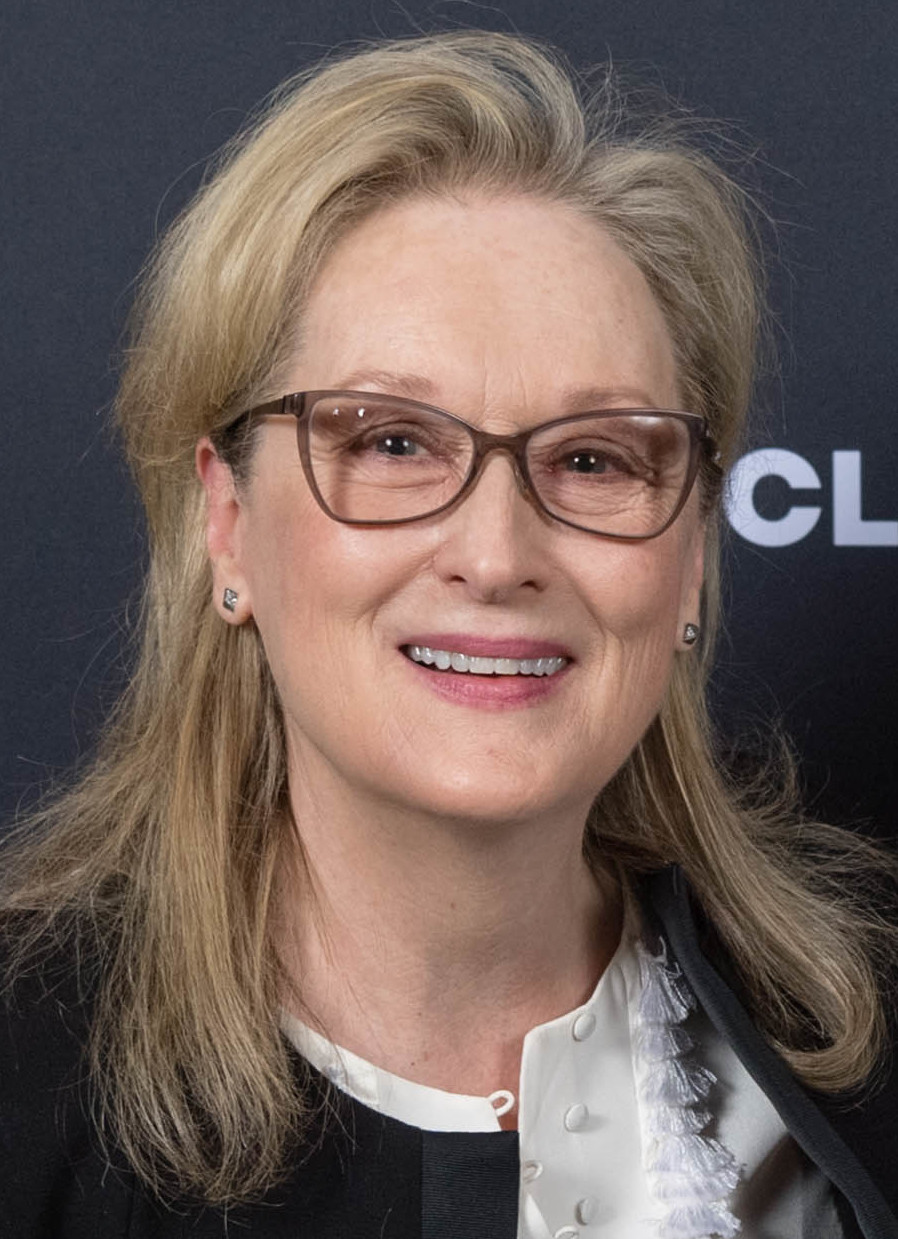
Meryl Streep — Best Actress in a Motion Picture, Drama winner

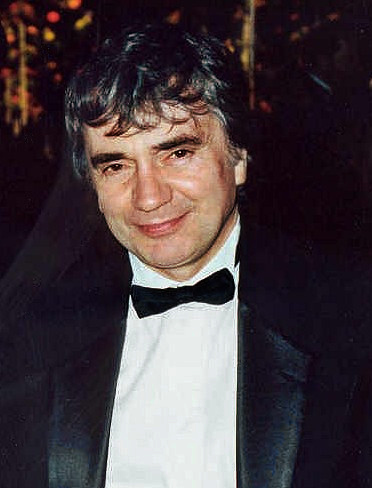
Dudley Moore — Best Actor in a Motion Picture, Comedy or Musical winner

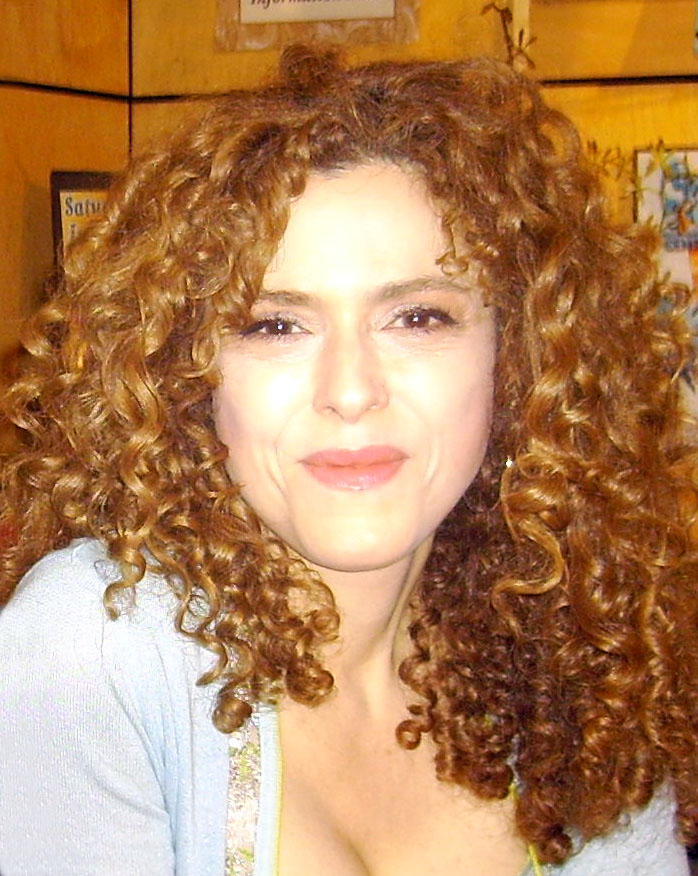
Bernadette Peters — Best Actress in a Motion Picture, Comedy or Musical winner

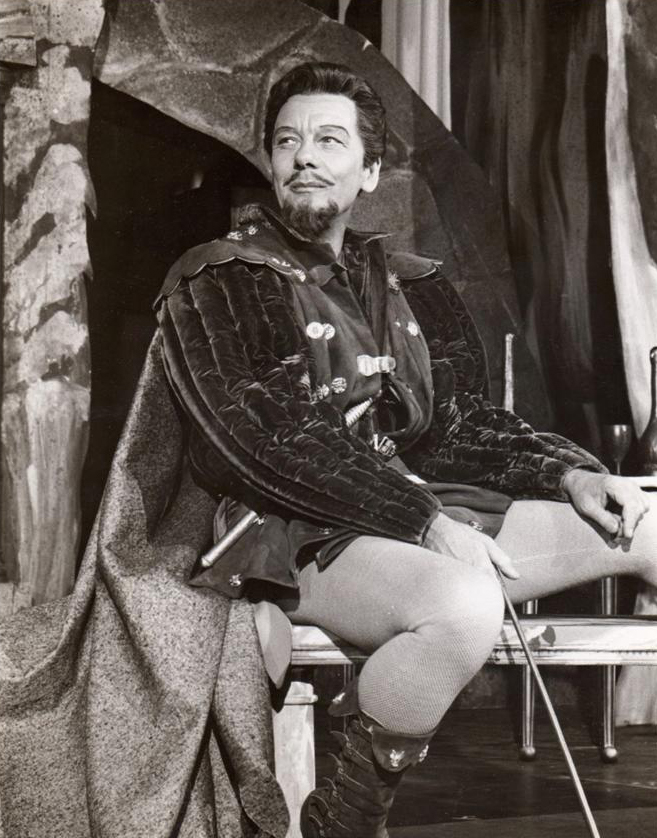
John Gielgud — Best Supporting Actor in a Motion Picture, winner

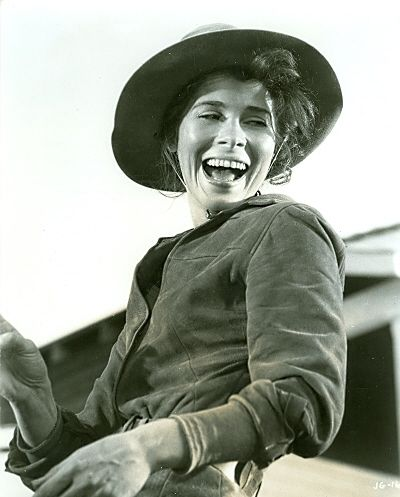
Joan Hackett — Best Supporting Actress in a Motion Picture, winner

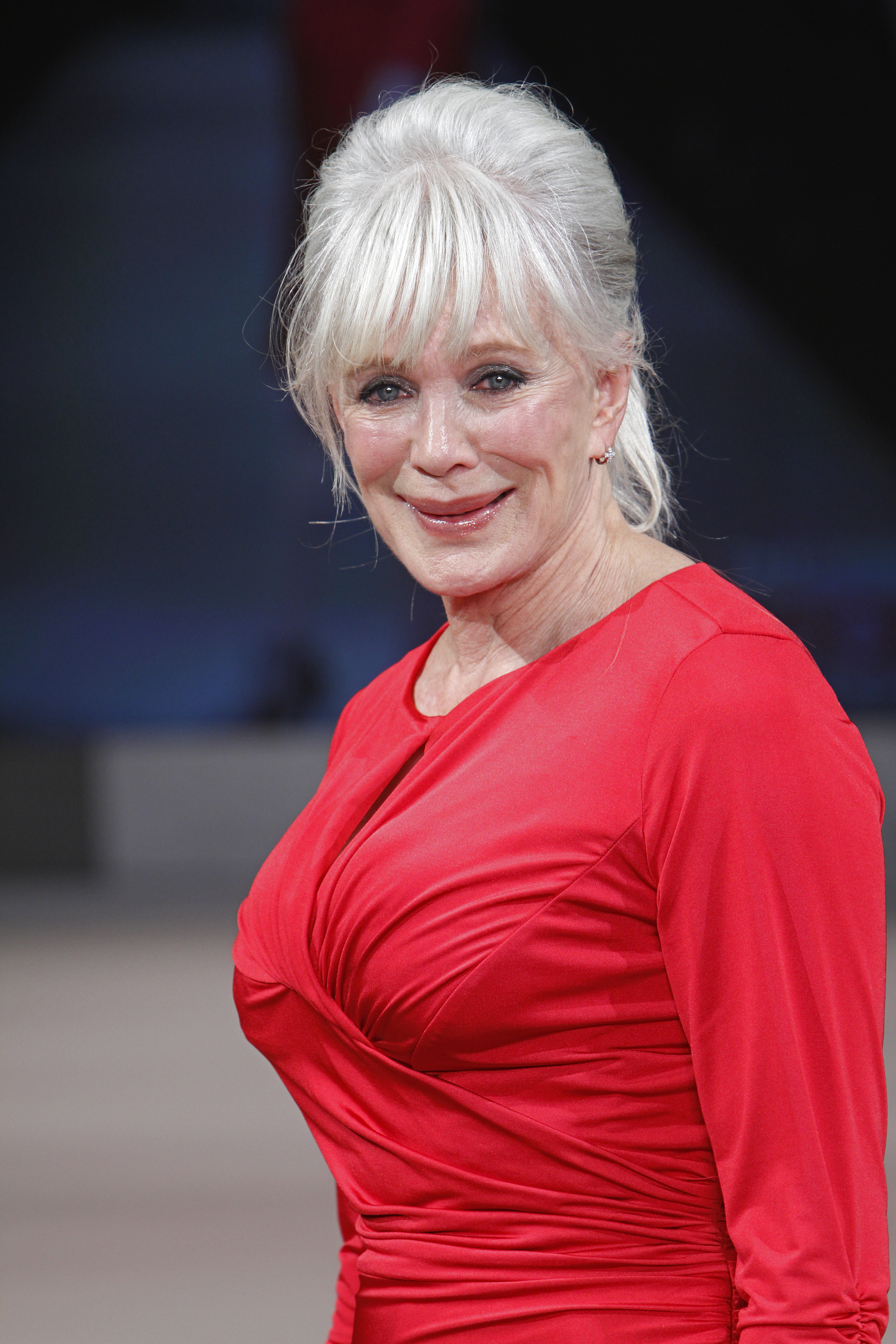
Linda Evans — Best Actress in a Television Series, Drama co-winner

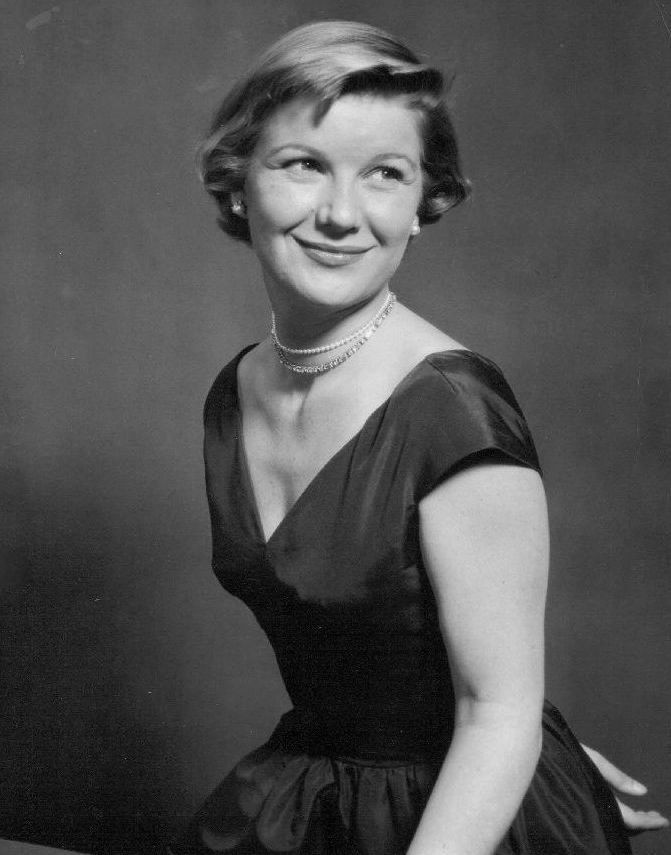
Barbara Bel Geddes — Best Actress in a Television Series, Drama co-winner

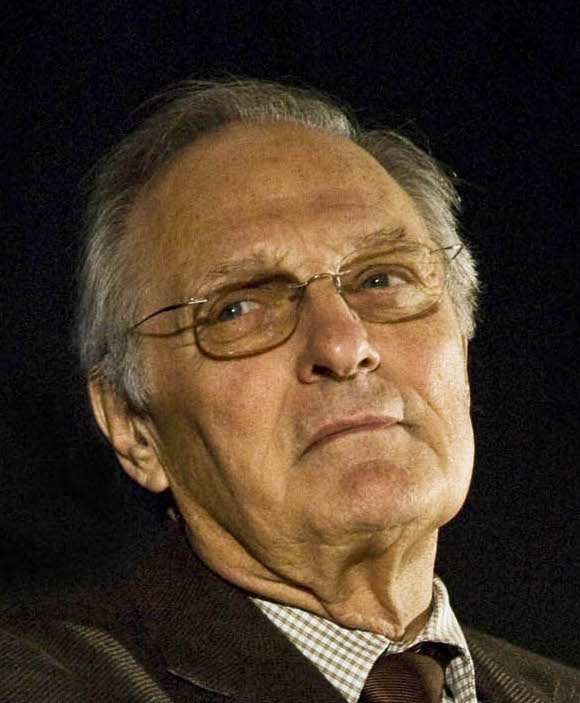
Alan Alda — Best Actor in a Television Series, Comedy or Musical winner

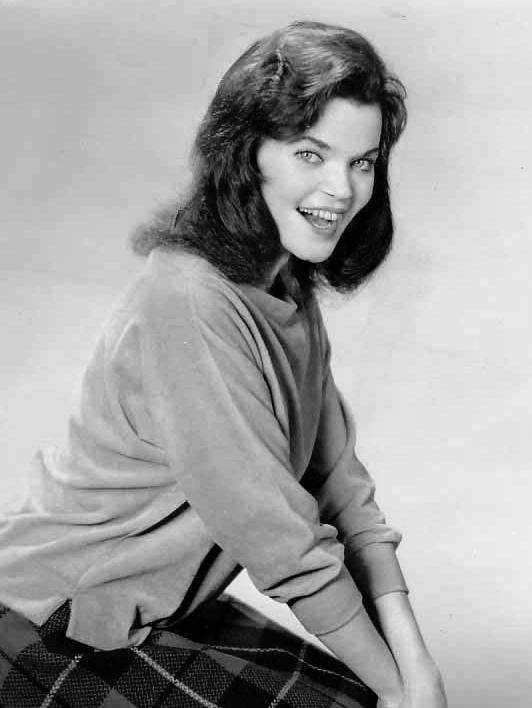
Eileen Brennan — Best Actress in a Television Series, Comedy or Musical winner

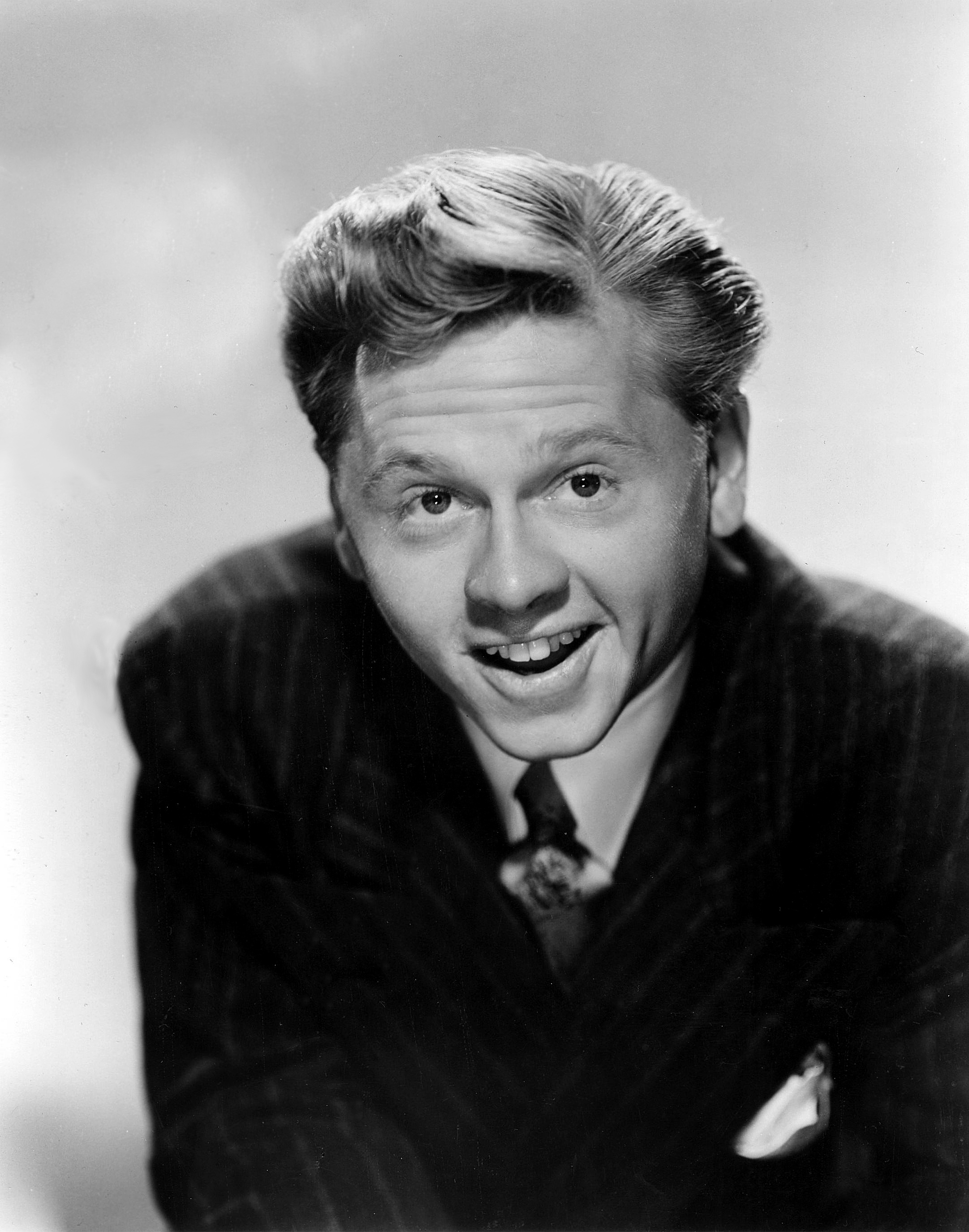
Mickey Rooney — Best Actor in a Miniseries or Television Film, winner

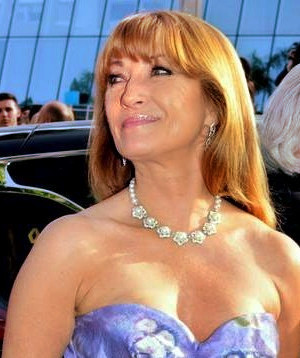
Jane Seymour — Best Actress in a Miniseries or Television Film, winner

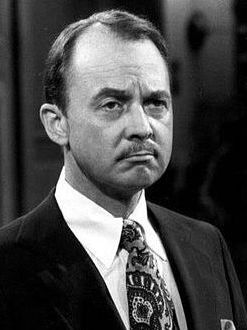
John Hillerman — Best Supporting Actor in a Series, Miniseries or Television Film, winner

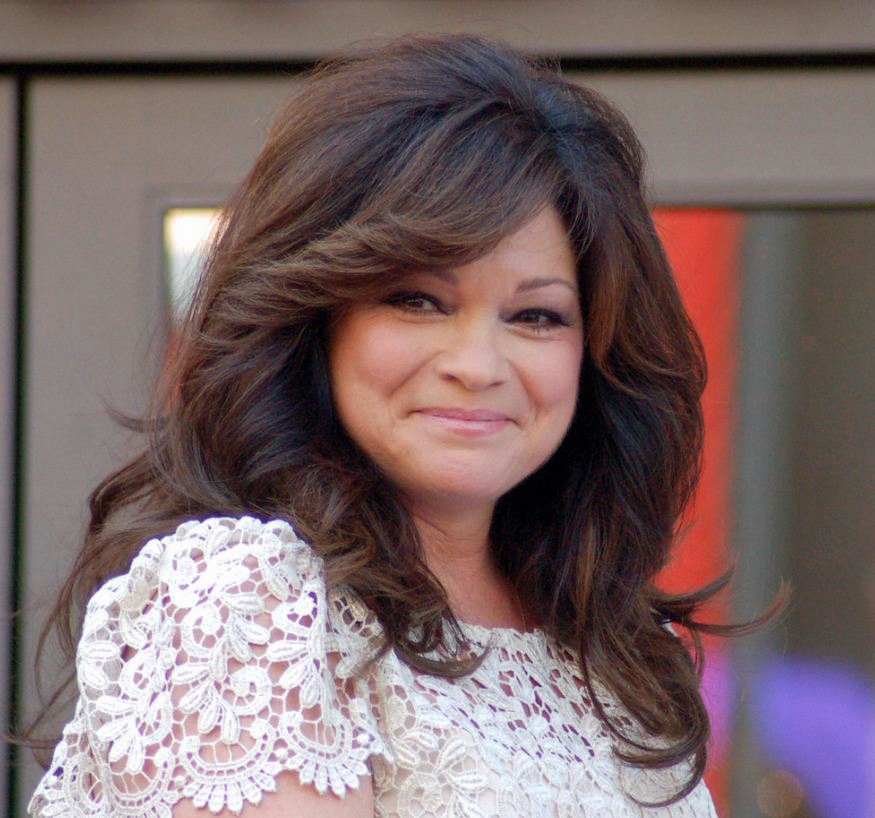
Valerie Bertinelli — Best Supporting Actress in a Series, Miniseries or Television Film, winner

=== Film ===
Best Motion Picture
Drama	Comedy or Musical
On Golden Pond; The French Lieutenant's Woman; Prince of the City; Ragtime; Reds	Arthur; The Four Seasons; Pennies from Heaven; S.O.B.; Zoot Suit
Best Performance in a Motion Picture – Drama
Actor	Actress
Henry Fonda – On Golden Pond as Norman Thayer; Warren Beatty – Reds as John Reed; Timothy Hutton – Taps as Brian Moreland; Burt Lancaster – Atlantic City as Lou Pascal; Treat Williams – Prince of the City as Daniel Ciello	Meryl Streep – The French Lieutenant's Woman as Sarah Woodruff / Anna; Sally Field – Absence of Malice as Megan Carter; Katharine Hepburn – On Golden Pond as Ethel Thayer; Diane Keaton – Reds as Louise Bryant; Sissy Spacek – Raggedy Man as Nita Longley
Best Performance in a Motion Picture – Comedy or Musical
Actor	Actress
Dudley Moore – Arthur as Arthur Bach; Alan Alda – The Four Seasons as Jack Burroughs; George Hamilton – Zorro, The Gay Blade as Don Diego Vega / Zorro / Wigglesworth / Ramon Vega; Steve Martin – Pennies from Heaven as Arthur Parker; Walter Matthau – First Monday in October as Dan Snow	Bernadette Peters – Pennies from Heaven as Eileen Everson; Blair Brown – Continental Divide as Dr. Nell Porter; Carol Burnett – The Four Seasons as Kate Burroughs; Jill Clayburgh – First Monday in October as Ruth Loomis; Liza Minnelli – Arthur as Linda Marolla
Best Supporting Performance in a Motion Picture – Drama, Comedy or Musical
Supporting Actor	Supporting Actress
John Gielgud – Arthur as Hobson; James Coco – Only When I Laugh as Jimmy; Jack Nicholson – Reds as Eugene O'Neill; Howard E. Rollins, Jr. – Ragtime as Coalhouse Walker, Jr.; Orson Welles – Butterfly as Judge Rauch	Joan Hackett – Only When I Laugh as Toby Landau; Jane Fonda – On Golden Pond as Chelsea Thayer Wayne; Kristy McNichol – Only When I Laugh as Polly Hines; Maureen Stapleton – Reds as Emma Goldman; Mary Steenburgen – Ragtime as Mother
Other
Best Director	Best Screenplay
Warren Beatty – Reds; Miloš Forman – Ragtime; Sidney Lumet – Prince of the City; Louis Malle – Atlantic City; Mark Rydell – On Golden Pond; Steven Spielberg – Raiders of the Lost Ark	On Golden Pond – Ernest Thompson; Absence of Malice – Kurt Luedtke; The Four Seasons – Alan Alda; The French Lieutenant's Woman – Harold Pinter; Reds – Warren Beatty and Trevor Griffiths
Best Original Song
"Arthur's Theme (Best That You Can Do)" (Carole Bayer Sager, Burt Bacharach, Peter Allen, Christopher Cross) – Arthur; "Endless Love" (Lionel Richie) – Endless Love; "For Your Eyes Only" (Bill Conti, Mick Leeson) – For Your Eyes Only; "It's Wrong for Me to Love You" (Ennio Morricone, Carol Connors) – Butterfly; "One More Hour" (Randy Newman, Jennifer Warnes) – Ragtime
Best Foreign Film	New Star of the Year
Chariots of Fire (UK); Atlantic City (Canada/France); Das Boot (West Germany); Gallipoli (Australia); Pixote (Brazil)	Pia Zadora – Butterfly as Kady Tyler; Elizabeth McGovern – Ragtime as Evelyn Nesbit; Howard E. Rollins, Jr. – Ragtime as Coalhouse Walker, Jr.; Kathleen Turner – Body Heat as Matty Tyler Walker; Rachel Ward – Sharky's Machine as Dominoe; Craig Wasson – Four Friends as Danilo Prozor

The following films received multiple nominations:

Nominations	Title
7	Ragtime
7	Reds
6	On Golden Pond
5	Arthur
4	The Four Seasons
3	Atlantic City
3	Butterfly
3	The French Lieutenant's Woman
3	Only When I Laugh
3	Pennies from Heaven
2	Absence of Malice
2	First Monday in October
2	Prince of the City

The following films received multiple wins:

Wins	Title
4	Arthur
3	On Golden Pond

=== Television ===
Best Television Series
Drama	Musical or Comedy
Hill Street Blues: Dallas; Dynasty; Hart to Hart; Lou Grant	M*A*S*H: Barbara Mandrell and the Mandrell Sisters; The Love Boat; Private Benjamin; Taxi
Best Performance in a Television Series – Drama
Actor	Actress
Daniel J. Travanti - Hill Street Blues as Capt. Francis "Frank" Furillo: Edward Asner - Lou Grant as Lou Grant; John Forsythe - Dynasty as Blake Carrington; Larry Hagman - Dallas as J.R. Ewing; Tom Selleck - Magnum, P.I. as Thomas Magnum IV	Barbara Bel Geddes - Dallas (tie) as Ellie Ewing Linda Evans - Dynasty (tie) as Krystle Carrington: Joan Collins - Dynasty as Alexis Colby; Morgan Fairchild - Flamingo Road as Constance Weldon Carlyle; Linda Gray - Dallas as Sue Ellen Ewing; Stefanie Powers - Hart to Hart as Jennifer Hart
Best Performance in a Television Series — Musical or Comedy
Actor	Actress
Alan Alda - M*A*S*H as Capt. Benjamin "Hawkeye" Pierce: James Garner - Bret Maverick as Bret Maverick; Judd Hirsch - Taxi as Alex Reiger; Gavin MacLeod - The Love Boat as Capt. Merrill Stubing; Tony Randall - Love, Sidney as Sidney Shorr	Eileen Brennan - Private Benjamin as Cpt. Doreen Lewis: Loni Anderson - WKRP in Cincinnati as Jennifer Marlowe; Bonnie Franklin - One Day at a Time as Ann Romano; Barbara Mandrell - Barbara Mandrell and the Mandrell Sisters as herself; Loretta Swit - M*A*S*H as Margaret "Hot Lips" Houlihan Penobscott
Best Performance in a Miniseries or Television Film
Actor	Actress
Mickey Rooney - Bill as Bill Sackter: Dirk Bogarde - The Patricia Neal Story as Roald Dahl; Timothy Hutton - A Long Way Home as Donald Burch Booth; Danny Kaye - Skokie as Max Feldman; Peter O'Toole - Masada as Lucius Flavius Silva; Ray Sharkey - The Ordeal of Bill Carney as Bill Carney; Peter Strauss - Masada as Eleazar Ben Yair	Jane Seymour - East of Eden as Cathy Ames/Kate Albey: Ellen Burstyn - The People vs. Jean Harris as Jean Harris; Glenda Jackson - The Patricia Neal Story as Patricia Neal; Jaclyn Smith - Jacqueline Bouvier Kennedy as Jacqueline "Jackie" Kennedy; Joanne Woodward - Crisis at Central High as Elizabeth Huckaby
Best Supporting Performance in a Series, Miniseries or Television Film
Supporting Actor	Supporting Actress
John Hillerman - Magnum, P.I. as Jonathan Higgins III: Danny DeVito - Taxi as Louie De Palma; Pat Harrington Jr. - One Day at a Time as Dwayne Schneider; Vic Tayback - Alice as Mel Sharples; Hervé Villechaize - Fantasy Island as Tattoo	Valerie Bertinelli - One Day at a Time as Barbara Cooper Royer: Danielle Brisebois - Archie Bunker's Place as Stephanie Mills; Beth Howland - Alice as Vera Louise Gorman Novak; Marilu Henner - Taxi as Elaine O'Connor Nardo; Lauren Tewes - The Love Boat as Julie McCoy
Best Miniseries or Television Film
Bill East of Eden: Masada; A Long Way Home; Murder in Texas

The following programs received multiple nominations:

Nominations	Title
4	Dallas
4	Dynasty
4	Taxi
3	The Love Boat
3	Masada
3	M*A*S*H
3	One Day at a Time
2	Alice
2	Barbara Mandrell and the Mandrell Sisters
2	Bill
2	East of Eden
2	Hart to Hart
2	Hill Street Blues
2	A Long Way Home
2	Lou Grant
2	Magnum P.I.
2	The Patricia Neal Story
2	Private Benjamin

The following programs received multiple wins:

Wins	Title
2	Bill
2	Hill Street Blues
2	M*A*S*H

== Ceremony ==
=== Miss Golden Globe ===
Laura Dern (daughter of Bruce Dern & Diane Ladd)

== See also ==
- 54th Academy Awards
- 2nd Golden Raspberry Awards
- 33rd Primetime Emmy Awards
- 34th Primetime Emmy Awards
- 35th British Academy Film Awards
- 36th Tony Awards
- 1981 in film
- 1981 in American television
