= Catch the Heat (film) =

1987 film directed by Joel Silberg

Catch the Heat, also known as Feel the Heat, Sin escape and Narcotraficantes, is a 1987 Argentine-American action film directed by Joel Silberg and written by Stirling Silliphant. It stars Tiana Alexandra, David Dukes, Rod Steiger and Brian Thompson. It was also released with the alternative titles Sentir la persecución ("Feel the Chase") and Misión: Alto riesgo ("Mission: High Risk").

== Synopsis ==
Checkers, a police officer who is very skilled with martial arts (and has a technique of her own) disguises herself as a showgirl/dancer to infiltrate a South American drug ring, while at the same time she unwittingly strikes up a relationship with Waldo, an undercover special agent who carries the same goal. They both partner up in order to stop Jason Hannibal, a ruthless kingpin who has been using unsuspecting starlets in order to smuggle drugs into the United States, hiding his product inside the aspiring women's new breast implants.

== Cast ==
- Tiana Alexandra ... Checkers Goldberg
- David Dukes ... Waldo Tarr
- Rod Steiger ... Jason Hannibal
- Brian Thompson ... Danny Boy
- Jorge Martínez (actor) ... Raul De Villa
- John Hancock ... Ike
- Brian Libby ... Brody
- Toru Tanaka ... Dozu
- Jessica Schultz ... Maria
- Russell Clark ... Reggie
- Norman Erlich ... Jose Calsado
- Cecilia Maresca ... Juanita
- Jacques Arndt ... Dr. Bleyer
- Miguel Habud ... Ramón
- John Dresden ... San Francisco Agent
- Bill Wood ... Officer #1
- Amparo Ibarlucia ... Hannibal's Secretary
- Masafumi Sakanashi ... Kendo Teacher
- Gerardo Bardelli ... Pianist
- Gary Jensen ... Drug Hustler at San Francisco
- Gene Lehfeldt ... Drug Hustler at San Francisco
- Michael Carr ... Drug Hustler at San Francisco
- Norberto Maceri ... Dancer
- Ariel Tejada ... Dancer
- Patricio Vargas ... Dancer
- Hugo Velardez ... Dancer
- Roberto Vernes ... Dancer
- Roberto Blanzaco ... Dancer

== Production ==
It was filmed in Technicolor and shot over a year in three locations: Los Angeles, San Francisco and the Villa María ranch, which was created by renowned Argentine painter and architect Alejandro Bustillo, and located in Máximo Paz (Buenos Aires Province).

== Release ==
The film first premiered in 1986 in Argentina, and then premiered on USA in October 1987. It was later shown on cable TV in 1993, under the title Sentir la persecución ("Feel the Chase").

== Bibliography ==
- A dictionary of Argentine Films (1930-1995) - Manrupe, Raúl; Portela, María Alejandra (2001). "Un diccionario de films argentinos (1930-1995)". Buenos Aires: Editorial Corregidor (Corregidor Publishing House). pp. 536–537. ISBN 950-05-0896-6.
- Hollywood in Don Torcuato. The Adventures of Roger Corman and Hector Olivera - Fevrier, Andrés (2020, Argentina). "Hollywood en Don Torcuato. Las aventuras de Roger Corman y Héctor Olivera". This work is licensed under the Creative Commons Attribution-NonCommercial-ShareAlike license. 4.0 International (CC BY-NC-SA 4.0). https://creativecommons.org/licenses/by-nc-sa/4.0/deed.es.
