= Bobby Sowell =

American musician, pianist and composer

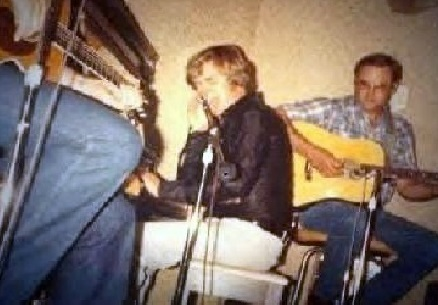
- Performing, 1982
- Born: Robert G. Lee Sowell; July 8, 1947 (age 78); Memphis, Tennessee, United States
- Occupations: Pianist, composer
- Website: Official website

Robert G. Lee Sowell (born July 8, 1947) is an American musician, pianist and composer. He spent much of his early years playing rockabilly piano in the late 1950s, playing organ in rock-and-roll bands in the 1960s and playing piano in numerous country music bands from the 1970s to the 1990s. He was a Mid-South Fair winner in 1966 and was inducted into the Rockabilly Hall of Fame in 2002. In 1994, he went out as a solo artist. As a pianist and composer, Sowell has recorded eight albums, crossing many genres of music, from jazz, pop, rock and roll, honky tonk and blues to country music, gospel and easy listening.

The following Memphis musicians were all part of bands with Sowell from the 1960s to the 1990s: Barry Sowell (Amazing Rhythm Aces), Bobby Whitlock (Eric Clapton, George Harrison), Bill Humble (Elvis Presley, Tom Jones), Danny Fitzgerald (Johnny Rodriguez), David Miller (Bill Black, U2), Eddie Slusser (Jerry Lee Lewis, Hank Williams Jr.), Fred Prouty (Charlie Rich), Glenn Childress (Lonestar), Jack Holder (Black Oak Arkansas), Jim Gammell (Eddie Bond), Robert Johnson (The Rolling Stones, ZZ Top), Ronnie Scaife (Neil Diamond), and Roy Yeager (Crackerjacks, Lobo, Atlanta Rhythm Section, Ronnie Milsap).

== Biography ==
Sowell was born in Memphis, Tennessee, and was named after a famous Southern Baptist preacher, Dr. Robert G. Lee. When Sowell was drafted during the Vietnam War, he dropped the initial and became Robert Lee Sowell. In music, his stage name has always been Bobby or Bobby Lee. Growing up in Memphis, Sowell had diverse musical influences. Early influences included Hank Williams, Elvis Presley, Carl Perkins and Muddy Waters. But what really got his attention were the piano players of that day, Jerry Lee Lewis, Fats Domino, Ray Charles, Roger Williams and Floyd Cramer. When Sowell was 16, he met Cramer, and the experience had a lasting effect on his music. His father played harmonica and piano by ear, and his mother sang and played the guitar; she sang on the radio in Chattanooga, Tennessee, in the 1940s. They used to have regular family singalongs, inviting area musicians to join in. Early rock and roll along with rockabilly, honkytonk, blues, gospel and his mother's country music had an influence on Sowell's creativity and can be heard in his music style throughout his career.

== Early life ==
About the time Sowell was 12 years old, honkytonk and rockabilly music were thriving in Memphis, and he started playing in bars and nightclubs with much older musicians. They used to sneak him in the back door and hide him behind an upright piano where no one could see how young he was. Sowell also played a lot of sock hops. He joined his first band, the Red Notes, an instrumental group, in 1959. His parents' house hosted many jam sessions for area musicians. Many successful professional musicians have come out of Frayser suburb of Memphis, and Sowell has picked with most of them. Around the age of 16 the British Invasion meant Sowell had to adapt to a new kind of music, in which the organ was a more prominent instrument than the piano. Sowell played in numerous groups in the 1960s. In 1966 he won the Mid-South Fair and was scheduled to appear on Ted Mack and the Original Amateur Hour on CBS Television, but before he could go there, he was drafted and served in the Vietnam War, and his music career was put on hold, although he played while in the military, NCO and Officers Clubs, winning talent shows. After the war and a bout with alcoholism, Sowell got back on the right track. He returned to his first love, the piano, playing and recording in an easy-listening style.

== Later life ==
Bobby Sowell has been performing music professionally from 1959 to the present day. In 2010, he formed a new blues band, Coldwater Revival (CWR). He is actively performing solo gigs or with the band, recording new music.

== Discography ==
- Natural High (1996)
- Country Gold Tribute (1999)
- Falling Waters (2014)
- a Tendre Merci (2015)
- Ricky's Got The Blues (2015)
- Many Colors of Tennessee (2016)
- A Simpler Life (2017)
- Sleepy bubbles (2017)
- Keep In Touch (2017)
- Oh Me, Oh My (2017)
- Let There Be Light (2017)

== Selected reading ==
- Bobby Sowell Rockabilly Biography: Bob Timmers (2002)
- The Memphis garage rock yearbook, 1960-1975 Ron Hall (2003), ISBN 978-0966857528
- Memphis Blues Musicians: Amazon.com (2010)
