= The Crackerjacks (band) =

- Also known as: Roy Yeager, David Preola, Jerry Stamson, Bobby Sowell, 1966 Memphis Rock Band 1966
- Origin: Memphis, Tennessee
- Years active: 1965–1968
- Past members: Roy Yeager; David Preola; Jerry Stamson; Bobby Sowell
- Website: Memphis Bands

The Crackerjacks were a 1960s Memphis garage rock group. Band members included organist-bassist Bobby Sowell, lead guitarist David Preola, lead singer Jerry Stamson, and drummer Roy Yeager. They gained popularity in 1966–67, regularly appearing on Memphis WHBQ TV Talent Party with George Klien (also a popular radio DJ and friend of Elvis Presley). They won the Mid-South Fair in 1966 for best group. The Crackerjacks had no bass player; Bobby Sowell played bass and organ at the same time. The group was short lived due to several reasons. Sowell was drafted in 1968, Preola also was drafted into the Army, Stampson went into the restaurant business and Yeager went with the group Lobo and the southern rock band Atlanta Rhythm Section. Sowell was inducted into the Rockabilly Hall of Fame in 2002. The Crackerjacks are featured in a rock book, History of Memphis Bands, 1960-72 by Ron Hall, available at bookstores.

== Early band history ==
The Crackerjacks were formed out of another popular 1960s Memphis garage band, The Out Of Its, in 1965–66. Besides Bobby Sowell, David Preola and Roy Yeager, other members included brothers Ricky and Micky Caughron and bass player Murphy Odom. They were a popular band with area colleges and universities, traveling the Mid-South in Mississippi, Arkansas, Kentucky and Tennessee. They won several Memphis area battles of the bands.

Personal conflicts and other factors lead to their breakup. Micky Caughron, Ricky Caughron and Murphy went with other bands while Sowell, Preola and Yeager formed The Crackerjacks, adding Jerry Stampson to the mix. Eventually, Fred Prouty replaced Yearger on drums and occasionally, Bobby Whitlock also sang with them. They also performed regularly at the club The Roaring 60's. Whitlock went on to play keyboards with Derek and the Dominoes, Eric Clapton and the Beatles's George Harrison.

== Selected reading ==
- History of Memphis Bands: 1960 - 1975 by Ron Hall (2003) Memphis, TN.
- Bobby Sowell Rockabilly Biography: Bob Timmers (2002 )
