= Paul Regina =

American actor (1956–2006)

- Regina in 1981
- Born: Paul Joseph Regina Jr. October 25, 1956; Brooklyn, New York, U.S.
- Died: January 31, 2006 (aged 49); Smithtown, New York, U.S.
- Education: Patchogue-Medford High School
- Occupations: Actor; Screenwriter
- Years active: 1976–2006
- Spouse: Nancy Dye (m. 1990)
- Children: 1

Paul Joseph Regina Jr. (October 25, 1956 – January 31, 2006) was an American actor and occasional screenwriter. He is best known for his role as Cliff Waters in the sitcom Brothers (1984–1989), as well as his roles as Felix Echeverria in the legal drama L.A. Law (1988–1992) and Frank Nitti in The Untouchables (1993–1994).

== Early life and education ==
Paul Joseph Regina Jr. was born in Brooklyn, New York, the son of Irma (née Manjarrez), an Internal Revenue Service employee, and Paul Joseph Regina, a tradesman. Raised in Medford, New York, he graduated from Patchogue-Medford High School in 1974 after appearing in several school plays and musicals. Paul attended Kentucky Wesleyan College in Owensboro, KY.

== Career ==
Regina began working professionally on stage in an off-Broadway production of The World of Sholom Aleichem in 1976. He played Kenickie in a national touring company of the musical Grease, and later appeared briefly in the Broadway production. He appeared in several additional plays in both Los Angeles and New York City throughout his career.

He began appearing on television in 1978 in the series Police Woman. He had starring roles in the television series Joe & Valerie from 1978 to 1979 with Char Fontane and Zorro and Son in 1983 with Henry Darrow.

He is perhaps best known for his portrayal of gay sibling Cliff Waters, with Robert Walden and Brandon Maggart as his two brothers, and Philip Charles MacKenzie as his best friend, in Showtime's groundbreaking 1980s sitcom Brothers, which was the first American sitcom with homosexual main characters that dealt with homosexuality in a real way. The show ran from 1984 until 1989.

He appeared in several made-for-television movies and had guest appearances on a variety of television series. He also had a recurring role in six episodes of L.A. Law as attorney Felix Echeverria, from 1988 to 1992, and went on to appear in fifteen episodes of the 1993–1994 series The Untouchables, playing Frank Nitti, one of Al Capone's top henchmen.

As a writer, he co-wrote the screenplay for the 2001 film Marie with its director, Fred Carpenter. He also penned the 2006 film Eddie Monroe, co-writing the screenplay with Fred Carpenter, Craig Weintraub (writing as Craig Morris), and Thom Ross. He was one of three screenwriters (the others being Fred Carpenter and Joanne Tamburro) for Just Like Joe, released in 2008. He collaborated again with Fred Carpenter and Joanne Tamburro on the story for the 2011 film Jesse, released after his death.

== Personal life and death ==
Regina was married to Nancy Dye, his teacher in an improv workshop, from 1990 until his death in 2006. They had a daughter, Nicolette.

After spending more than 20 years in Hollywood, he returned to his boyhood home of Medford, New York to be with his family.

Regina died of liver cancer in Smithtown, New York on January 31, 2006, at the age of 49.

== Filmography ==
Film and Television
Year	Title	Role	Notes
1978	The Hardy Boys/Nancy Drew Mysteries	Steve	1 episode: "Oh Say Can You Sing"
1978	Police Woman	Larry Tarash	1 episode: "Sons"
1978–1979	Joe & Valerie	Joe Pizo	Main role (8 episodes)
1980	A Change of Seasons	Paul Di Lisi	Feature film
1980	Hagen	Jess	1 episode: "The Rat Pack"
1981	Benson	Dominic	1 episode: "Big Buddy"
1981	The Choice	Michael Vitela	TV movie
1981	Here's Boomer	Steve Leckonby	1 episode: "Boomer Goes for the Gold"
1981	A Long Way Home	David Branch Czaky	TV movie
1982	Code Red	Mickey Matisse	1 episode: "From One Little Spark"
1982	Gimme a Break!	Jonathan	1 episode: "An Unmarried Couple"
1982	The Renegades	Joey Tate	TV movie
1982	Cassie & Co.	Marco	1 episode: "A Ring Ain't Always a Circle"
1982	The Powers of Matthew Star	Pete	1 episode: "Daredevil"
1982	Tucker's Witch	Sven	1 episode: "Big Mouth"
1982	The Devlin Connection	Gary	1 episode: "Love, Sin and Death at Point Dume"
1982	Voyagers!	Marco Polo	1 episode: "The Travels of Marco... and Friends"
1983	T. J. Hooker	Larry Coates	1 episode: "The Mumbler"
1983	Zorro and Son	Don Carlos de Vega (Zorro Jr.)	Main role (5 episodes)
1983	Adam	Joe Walsh	TV movie
1983	The Awakening of Candra	Julio Torres	TV movie
1984–1989	Brothers	Cliff Waters	Main cast (115 episodes)
1986	Adam: His Song Continues	Joe Walsh	TV movie
1988–1992	L.A. Law	Felix Echeverria	Recurring role (6 episodes)
1990	Freddy's Nightmares	Vinnie / Derby Brown II	1 episode: "What You Don't Know Can Kill You"
1990	Hunter	Tony Scarlatti	1 episode: "Son and Heir"
1990	Empty Nest	Michael	1 episode: "Lessons"
1991	Equal Justice	Mr. Lieberthal	1 episode: "Part of the Plan"
1991	Herman's Head	Ted Tatum	1 episode: "The Herman-ator"
1992	Mann & Machine	Mr. Battista	1 episode: "Truth or Consequences"
1992	Bay City Story	Tony Cefalu	TV movie
1993	Bounty Tracker	Paul Damone	Feature film
1993–1994	The Untouchables	Frank Nitti	Main cast (42 episodes)
1995	Sharon's Secret	Davies	TV movie
1996	It's My Party	Tony Zamara	Feature film
1996	Prey of the Jaguar	Randall Bentley	Feature film
2000	Law & Order	Det. Tony Renado	1 episode: "Narcosis"
2001	Marie	Nadi	Feature film
2002	Law & Order: Special Victims Unit	Jeffery Trapani	1 episode: "Counterfeit"
2002	The Blue Lizard	Nick	Feature film
2006	Eddie Monroe	Monty	Posthumous release (final film role)

== Author ==
- Marie (Screenplay, 2001)
- Eddie Monroe (Screenplay, 2006)
- Just Like Joe (Screenplay, 2008)
- Jesse (Story, 2011)

== Stage ==
- The World of Sholom Aleichem (Roundabout Theatre, New York City, 1976)
- Grease (Broadway production and U.S. tour, 1976)
- A Hundred Percent Alive (Westwood Playhouse, Los Angeles, 1979)
- Mississippi Blue (Los Angeles Actors Theatre, Los Angeles)
- Two Outs Bottom of the Ninth (McCadden Place Theatre, Los Angeles, 1983)
- Wrestlers (Cast Theatre, Los Angeles, 1985)
- Grand Junction (Coast Playhouse, Los Angeles, 1988)
- The Sisters (Pasadena Playhouse, Los Angeles, 1995)
