= Pearl (miniseries) =

- Written by: Stirling Silliphant
- Directed by: Hy Averback; Alexander Singer
- Starring: Angie Dickinson; Dennis Weaver; Robert Wagner; Lesley Ann Warren; Tiana Alexandra; Gregg Henry; Katherine Helmond; Adam Arkin; Brian Dennehy; Max Gail; Char Fontane; Audra Lindley; Richard Anderson; Marion Ross; Les Lannom; Fred Stromsoe
- Music by: John Addison
- Country of origin: United States
- Original language: English
- No. of episodes: 3

Production
- Executive producers: Frank Konigsberg; Stirling Silliphant
- Producer: Sam Manners
- Cinematography: Gayne Rescher
- Editor: Donald R. Rode
- Running time: 278 minutes
- Production company: Warner Bros. Television

Original release
- Network: ABC
- Release: November 16 – November 19, 1978

Pearl is a 1978 American television miniseries about events leading up to the attack on Pearl Harbor, written by Stirling Silliphant. It starred a large cast, notably Dennis Weaver, Tiana Alexandra, Robert Wagner, Angie Dickinson, Brian Dennehy, Lesley Ann Warren, Gregg Henry, Max Gail, Richard Anderson, Marion Ross, Audra Lindley, Char Fontane, Katherine Helmond and Adam Arkin.

== Cast ==
- Angie Dickinson as Midge Forrest
- Dennis Weaver as Colonel Jason Forrest
- Robert Wagner as Captain Cal Lankford
- Lesley Ann Warren as Dr. Carol Lang
- Tiana Alexandra as Holly Nagata
- Gregg Henry as Lieutenant Doug North
- Katherine Helmond as Mrs. Sally Colton
- Adam Arkin as Private Billy Zylowski
- Brian Dennehy as Sergeant Otto Chain
- Max Gail as 1st Sergeant Walder
- Char Fontane as Shirley
- Audra Lindley as Lily, General's Wife
- Richard Anderson as Commander Michael North
- Marion Ross as Ellie North
- Allan Miller as Harrison
- Christian Vance as Private John Finger
- Mary Crosby as Patricia North
- Charles Lucia as Lieutenant Christopher
- Les Lannom as Chief Looper
- Fred Stromsoe as Corporal Perkins
- Joseph Campanella as The Narrator
- So Yamamura as Commander of The Japanese Carrier Force (uncredited)

== Plot summary ==
While the Japanese First Air Fleet sails toward Hawaii, personnel at the varied bases as well as civilians go about their lives. Primary protagonists are hard scrabble and bigoted Army MP Colonel Jason Forrest and his clashes with his bitter wife Midge, his well-to-do XO Captain Calvin Lankford, and briefly with local news writer Holly Nagata and punkish MP Sergeant Otto Chain.

On the Navy side are Lieutenant Douglas North and his father (Commander Michael North) and mother and also his reacquaintance with former classmate Holly Nagata, a friendship she successfully makes a romantic relationship (right to seducing Doug in her car; though unstated in the miniseries their lovemaking results in pregnancy).

Everyone's lives are torn asunder when the Japanese attack strikes the island.

== Production ==
To keep production costs manageable, the scenes of the attack were footage originally shot for the film Tora! Tora! Tora!. The miniseries also used newly dubbed footage of So Yamamura to portray Admiral Isoroku Yamamoto, the Japanese commander of the attack.

== Novelization ==
Some sources erroneously cite the miniseries as based on a novel by dramatist Sterling Silliphant, but in fact the reverse is true. As the copyright and publication dates indicate, Silliphant novelized his scripts for a paperback original, intended in part to promote the miniseries. (Silliphant had similarly novelized his screenplay for The Slender Thread.) With a timing typical of the era, it was released by Dell Books as a tie-in edition six months in advance of the mini-series airing.

The novelization is more graphic than the miniseries (such as when Doug North and Holly Nagata make love in her car) and includes a subplot involving a Japanese fighter pilot who eventually strafes Doug North's ship.

== Reception ==
=== Release ===
The miniseries aired in three installments on ABC on November 16, 17 and 19, 1978. All three parts were among the top ten most watched prime time shows of the week, with the series watched all or in part by about 80 million people. ABC had nine of the top 10 shows for the week of November 13, 1978 where Pearl was ranked 3rd, 9th, and 5th. Pearl was re-aired December 3–7, 1991 on NBC.

=== Critical response ===
The Associated Press wrote: "To borrow from Dickens: it is the best of television, it is the worst of television."

John Corry of The New York Times wrote: "Pearl is the television equivalent of a good read, a good long read. It doesn't strain us; we keep turning pages, and so what if we know early on how it will all turn out? When our attention wanders, Pearl reclaims it with a love scene, a sinking battleship or another flight of Zeros."
