= Joe & Valerie =

1978 American sitcom TV series

- Created by: Bernie Kahn; Ronald Rubin
- Written by: Howard Albrecht; Hal Dresner; Bernie Kahn; Sol Weinstein
- Directed by: Bill Persky (1978); Bob Claver (1978–79)
- Starring: Paul Regina; Char Fontane
- Music by: Jack Elliott, Allyn Ferguson (1978); Joe Raposo, Patti Brooks (1979)
- Opening theme: Char Fontane, Randy Winburn (1978); Patti Brooks, Jean Raposo (1979)
- Country of origin: United States
- Original language: English
- No. of seasons: 2
- No. of episodes: 8 (1 unaired)

Production
- Executive producer: Linda Hope
- Producers: Bernie Kahn (1978); Frank Badami (1979)
- Running time: 30 minutes
- Production company: Hope Enterprises

Original release
- Network: NBC
- Release: April 24, 1978 – January 19, 1979

Joe & Valerie is an American sitcom starring Paul Regina and Char Fontane as the title characters that aired on NBC in two parts: four half-hour segments from April 24 to May 10, 1978, and three half-hour segments from January 5 to January 19, 1979 (with one episode remaining unaired). The series was produced by Bob Hope's production company, Hope Enterprises, and his daughter, Linda, served as executive producer.

== Synopsis and changing formats ==
The first season, set in 1978 Brooklyn, follows the romantic misadventures of a teenage couple – Joe Pizo, an apprentice plumber, and Valerie Sweetzer, a cosmetics salesgirl – who meet and fall in love at a New York City disco. Joe shares an apartment with his roommates Frank and Paulie (who call themselves "The Big Three") while Valerie lives at home with her divorced mother, Stella.

The second season in early 1979 centers on the courtship, marriage and efforts of Joe and Valerie as they begin a married life together in Brooklyn. This new updated version of the series also saw cast changes as the role of Valerie's mother Stella was recast with Arlene Golonka and Lloyd Alan replaced Bill Beyers as Joe's chauvinist friend Frank; Donna Ponterotto returned as Valerie's friend, but her character name was changed from Thelma to Rita.

The show was highly influenced by the disco craze of the late 1970s and the movie Saturday Night Fever specifically.

== Cast ==
=== Season 1 ===
- Paul Regina as Joe Pizo (Valerie's boyfriend, an apprentice plumber)
- Char Fontane as Valerie Sweetzer (Joe's girlfriend, a cosmetics salesgirl)
- Bill Beyers as Frank Berganski (Joe's friend/roommate, a chauvinist)
- David Elliott as Paulie Barone (Joe's friend/roommate, a hearse driver)
- Donna Ponterotto as Thelma Medina (Valerie's friend)
- Pat Benson as Stella Sweetzer (Valerie's mother)
- Robert Costanzo as Vincent Pizo (Joe's father, a plumber)

=== Season 2 ===
- Paul Regina as Joe Pizo (Valerie's husband, an apprentice plumber)
- Char Fontane as Valerie Sweetzer-Pizo (Joe's wife, a cosmetics salesgirl)
- Lloyd Alan as Frank Berganski (Joe's friend, a chauvinist)
- David Elliott as Paulie Barone (Joe's friend, a hearse driver)
- Donna Ponterotto as Rita (Valerie's friend)
- Arlene Golonka as Stella Sweetzer (Valerie's mother)
- Robert Costanzo as Vincent Pizo (Joe's father, a plumber)
- Jack Riley as Ed Sweetzer (Valerie's father, Stella's ex-husband)

== Episodes ==
=== Season 1 (1978) ===
No.	Title	Directed by	Written by	Original release date
1	"The Meeting"	Unknown	Bernie Kahn	April 24, 1978
Joe and Valerie, two young teenagers from blue-collar families, meet at a New York disco and fall in love when Joe bets his roommates, Frank and Paulie, that he can take Valerie away from her dancing partner.
2	"The Perfect Night"	Unknown	Howard Albrecht and Sol Weinstein	May 1, 1978
Valerie arranges a disastrous date between Frank and her best friend Thelma and when she fixes up Paulie with a co-worker who gets married the night before the date, she must come up with a last minute substitute.
3	"Valerie's Wild Oat"	Unknown	Unknown	May 3, 1978
Joe and Valerie's romance hits a potential roadblock when Valerie finds out that her new boss at the department store is her ex-boyfriend Ernie (Marcus Smythe).
4	"The Commitment"	Unknown	Unknown	May 10, 1978
When Valerie's mother is unexpectedly called away for the weekend, Joe and Valerie face the prospect of spending their first night together; Joe's dilemma is that he loves Valerie too much to stay and he's afraid of what the guys will think if he doesn't.

=== Season 2 (1979) ===
No.	Title	Directed by	Written by	Original release date
5	"The Engagement"	Bob Claver	Unknown	January 5, 1979
Joe and Valerie break the news to their respective parents that they have decided to live together which causes an uproar and the subsequent search for a place to live through a rental service causes even more havoc.
6	"The Wedding Guest"	Bob Claver	Unknown	January 12, 1979
Joe and Valerie learn that a gangster's funeral is scheduled at the same time and in the same church as their wedding.
7	"The Wedding"	Bob Claver	Unknown	January 19, 1979
The newly-married Joe and Valerie take a flashback look at the hilarious events that occurred before their wedding: Frank and Paulie feuding over who will be the best man and Stella threatening to boycott the wedding if her ex-husband (Valerie's father) shows up.
8	"Paulie's First Love"	Bob Claver	TBD	UNAIRED
