= John Hancock (actor) =

American actor (1941–1992)

- Hancock as "Fat Freddy" in the 1984 action-comedy City Heat.
- Born: March 4, 1941; Hazen, Arkansas, U.S.
- Died: October 12, 1992 (aged 51); Los Angeles, California, U.S.
- Years active: 1969–1992

John Hancock (March 4, 1941 – October 12, 1992) was an American actor.

== Early life ==
Born in Hazen, Arkansas, Hancock moved to Detroit, Michigan with his parents. Hancock went to Wayne State University in Detroit. He was employed at Mid-Town Market to pay his way through college. Hancock is possibly best remembered for his role as "Scotty" in the ABC miniseries Roots: The Next Generations. His large size and distinctive bass voice allowed him to establish a niche playing authority figures, and he was often cast as a minister, judge or high-ranking military officer.

== Career ==
Hancock also made recurring appearances in several television shows during his career, including Knots Landing, Cheers, Family Ties, Diff'rent Strokes, Cop Rock, The Dukes of Hazzard, Houston Knights, Star Trek: The Next Generation, Murder, She Wrote, Amen, Midnight Caller, Pacific Station, Family Matters, and L.A. Law. He was working with Susan Dey on the CBS sitcom Love & War as the bartender "Ike Johnson" in 1992, when he died of a heart attack at his home in Los Angeles. Hancock's character's death was subsequently written into the series and he was replaced by actor Charlie Robinson.

Hancock was interred in the Devotion section, at Forest Lawn, Hollywood Hills Cemetery in Los Angeles, California.

== Filmography ==
Year	Title	Role	Notes
1971	Brother John	Henry's Friend	
1974	Cyrano de Bergerac	Cut Purse	
1978	Foul Play	Coleman	
1979	The In-Laws	T Man #1	
1979	10	Dr. Croce	
1980	The Black Marble	Clarence Cromwell	
1980	First Family	President Mazai Kalundra	
1980	White Mama	Tall Black Man	
1981	...All the Marbles	Big John' Stanley, TTs Promoter	
1982	Airplane II: The Sequel	Controller #1	
1982	Incredible Hulk	Isaac Whittier Ross	
1982	Gavilan	Boat Captain	
1983	The Sting II	Doc Brown	
1983	Deal of the Century	Baptist Minister	
1984	Tank	Mess Sergeant	
1984	A Soldier's Story	Sergeant Washington	
1984	City Heat	Fat Freddy	
1985	Benson	Mayor Waring	
1986	Crossroads	Sheriff Tilford	
1987	Catch the Heat	Ike	
1987	Dead Aim	Talbot	
1987–88	Houston Knights	Chicken	
1988	Big Business	Older Harlan	
1988	Traxx	Chief Emmett Decker	
1989	Rapid Fire	Marine / Sailor #20	
1989	Collision Course	Lieutenant Ryerson	
1989	Sundown: The Vampire in Retreat	Quinton Canada	
1990	Why Me?	Tiny	
1990	The Bonfire of the Vanities	Reverend Bacon	
