= Zorro and Son =

American television Western

- Paul Regina (left) and Henry Darrow
- Genre: Sitcom
- Starring: Henry Darrow; Paul Regina; Bill Dana
- Composer: George Duning
- Country of origin: United States
- Original language: English
- No. of seasons: 1
- No. of episodes: 5

Production
- Producer: Kevin Corcoran
- Camera setup: Multi-camera
- Running time: 22–24 minutes
- Production company: Walt Disney Television

Original release
- Network: CBS
- Release: April 6 – June 1, 1983

Related
- Zorro

Zorro and Son is an American television Western based on the character Zorro that aired on CBS. Created by Walt Disney Television, the series stars Henry Darrow as Zorro (Don Diego) and Paul Regina as his son Zorro Jr. (Don Carlos). The limited series aired for five episodes from April 6 to May 4, 1983.

It featured an updated version of the theme song by Norman Foster and George Bruns that was used on Disney's 1957 Zorro television series. The lyrics were altered to reflect that there were two Zorros, for example the original had the words "this bold renegade", while the updated version had "these bold renegades".

== Synopsis ==
Set approximately twenty years after the first series, Zorro and Son is an updated, comical version of the original series.

== Cast ==
- Henry Darrow as Don Diego de Vega (Zorro Sr.)
- Paul Regina as Don Carlos de Vega (Zorro Jr.)
- Richard Beauchamp as Sergeant Sepulveda
- Bill Dana as Bernardo
- Barney Martin as Brothers Napa and Sonoma
- John Moschitta Jr. as Corporal Cassette
- Catherine Parks as Senorita Anita
- Gregory Sierra as Captain Paco Pico

== US TV ratings ==
Season	Episodes	Start date	End date	Nielsen rank	Nielsen rating
1982-83	5	April 6, 1983	June 1, 1983	79	N/A

== Episodes ==
No.	Title	Directed by	Written by	Original release date
1	"Zorro and Son"	Peter Baldwin	Eric Cohen	April 6, 1983
A monk is in trouble. He is going to be embarrassed in front of everyone, even possibly hurt. Zorro and his son must hurry to rescue the monk from harm's way. A new era begins with Zorro and his son now helping other people. They both want to end evil and bring more justice.
2	"Beauty and the Mask"	Gabrielle Beaumont	Eric Cohen, Nick Arnold	April 13, 1983
Don Carlos falls in love with Angelica after he saves her. He uses his father's costume to do so, in which he vows to follow the Zorro promise. His father is informed by his son that he loves her, and that he wants her to know this. Meanwhile, Pico is up to no good trying to catch Zorro and put a stop to his good deeds.
3	"A Fistful of Pesos"	Alan Myerson	Eric Cohen, Nick Arnold	April 20, 1983
Pico frames Zorro by dressing up as him and robbing stores, hoping to turn the people against him.
4	"Wash Day"	Peter Baldwin	Eric Cohen, Nick Arnold	May 4, 1983
While Bernardo is washing clothes, Zorro's outfit blows away into the reach of Paco Pico. Pico takes Bernardo into jail to get him to admit that Don Diego is Zorro, but Bernardo declares that he himself is Zorro. Don Carlos & Diego must save Bernardo before he is hurt, but their outfits have shrunk. Sergeant Sepulveda helps them out, so they can help Bernardo.
5	"The Butcher of Barcelona"	Gabrielle Beaumont	Eric Cohen, Nick Arnold	June 1, 1983
When Paco Pico is confronted by Captain Jorge Mendez and El Excellente, he becomes afraid that he might lose his spot in the office. He turns to Don Diego for support to help him keep his position. In the end, Diego tells Pico that he didn't want Captain Mendez in charge because he would be a greater ruler than Pico. Also, according to Mendez, he almost caught Diego.
