= Roy Yeager =

American musician (born 1949)

- Born: Roy Yeager; February 4, 1949 (age 77); Greenwood, Mississippi, U.S.
- Occupations: Drummer, percussionist, record producer

Roy Yeager (born February 4, 1949) is an American musician and record producer.

His musical career started off when he moved to Memphis, Tennessee at the age of 14. Yeager met Bobby Sowell in high school in 1964 and soon they were playing gigs, as a duo and with bands. He drummed with the popular Memphis 1960s groups, The Out Of It's and The Crackerjacks, touring the mid-south and played regularly at the popular Thunderbird Lounge and Roaring 60s in Memphis.

In 1972, he went with Lobo, in 1974 drummed for singer Joe South. His big break came in 1979 when he joined the southern rock group Atlanta Rhythm Section, he toured with them for three and a half years, recording hit records. He moved to Nashville in the 1980s after marrying, became a record producer and bought his own recording studio, Back Street Studio and Rumble Productions. He has done sessions with many rock and country artists including Ronnie Milsap, Dale Hawkins, Alicia Bridges, Paul Davis, Mike Heron, Gail Davis and others.

In 1998, Yeager sold his recording studio and retired, dabbling in real estate and other investments.

He was married to former actress and singer Char Fontane until her death in 2007.

== Credits ==
| 1972 | Of a Simple Man | Lobo | Drums |
| 1973 | Calumet | Lobo | Percussion, Drums |
| 1973 | John Lovick Turner | John Lovick Turner | Drums |
| 1974 | Pyramid | Pyramid | Drums |
| 1974 | Ride 'em Cowboy | Paul Davis | Drums |
| 1975 | As I See It Now | Melanie | Percussion, Drums, Vocals |
| 1975 | Midnight Rainbows | Joe South | Drums |
| 1975 | Mike Herons Reputation | Mike Heron | Percussion |
| 1976 | Southern Tracks & Fantasies | Paul Davis | Drums |
| 1978 | Alicia Bridges | Alicia Bridges | Drums |
| 1978 | Gail Davies | Gail Davies | Percussion, Drums |
| 1979 | Rain in My Life | Bill LaBounty | Drums |
| 1979 | Underdog | Atlanta Rhythm Section | Drums |
| 1980 | Boys from Doraville | Atlanta Rhythm Section | Drums |
| 1980 | Hard Times on Easy Street | David Lynn Jones | |
| 1981 | Quinella | Atlanta Rhythm Section | Percussion, Drums |
| 1982 | Best of Atlanta Rhythm Section | | Percussion, Drums |
| 1985 | Lost in the 50s Tonight | Ronnie Milsap | Percussion, Drums |
| 1989 | Live in Front of a Bunch of Dickheads | Pinkard & Bowden | Drums |
| 1991 | Where It's At, You're Coming Home With Me | Alan James album "Break The Ice", | Drums |
| 1994 | Lauralea | Lauralea | Drums |
| 1999 | As True As You (Songs For Ricky) | Threk Michaels | Drums |
| 1999 | Backtracks | Atlanta Rhythm Section | Drums |
| 1999 | Wildcat Tamer | Dale Hawkins | Drums |
| 2000 | Fool's Paradise | Dale Hawkins | Drums |
| 2000 | Live at the Savoy, New York Atlanta Rhythm Section | | Drums |
| 2003 | Do You Still Feel the Same Way? [Japan] | Tommie Young | Drums, Percussion |
| 2004 | Best Of You Can't Hear Me Callin' Bluegrass: 80 Years | Various Artists | Drums |
| 2004 | Can't You Hear Me Callin' - Bluegrass: 80 Years of Am | Various Artists | Drums |
| 2005 | Echo Coming Back: The Best of Mike Heron | | Drums |
| 2005 | Introducing Lobo/Of a Simple Man | Lobo | Drums |
| 2006 | As I See It Now | Tracy Lawrence | Drums, Percussion |
| 2007 | Back Down to Louisiana | Dale Hawkins | Drums |
| 2008 | Bare/Sleeper Wherever I Fall | Bobby Bare | Drums |
| 2009 | Moonlight Feels Right/Rock 'N' Roll Rocket | Starbuck | Drums |
| 2010 | Underdog/The Boys from Doraville | Atlanta Rhythm Section | Drums, Percussion |
| 2010 | A Look Inside/So the Seeds Are Growing | Joe South | Drums, Vocals |
| 2012 | Lost in the Fifties Tonight/Heart & Soul | Ronnie Milsap | Drums |
| 2012 | From the Vaults | Atlanta Rhythm Section | Drums |
| 2014 | The RCA Albums Collection | Ronnie Milsap | Drums |
| 2014 | Summer Number Seventeen | Ronnie Milsap | Drums |
| 2018 | One from the Vaults | Atlanta Rhythm Section | Drums |
