= The Night the Bridge Fell Down =

- Genre: Disaster film
- Written by: Arthur Weiss; Ray Goldstone; Michael Robert David
- Directed by: Georg Fenady
- Starring: James MacArthur; Desi Arnaz Jr. Char Fontane; Richard Gilliland; Leslie Nielsen; Eve Plumb; Barbara Rush; Gregory Sierra
- Music by: Richard LaSalle
- Country of origin: United States
- Original language: English

Production
- Producer: Irwin Allen
- Cinematography: John M. Nickolaus Jr.
- Editor: Axel Hubert
- Running time: 180 minutes
- Production company: Irwin Allen Productions

Original release
- Network: BBC One
- Release: September 6, 1980
- Network: NBC
- Release: February 28, 1983

The Night the Bridge Fell Down is an American disaster film starring James MacArthur, Desi Arnaz Jr., and Leslie Nielsen. The movie was produced by Irwin Allen in 1979 in association with Warner Bros. Television for NBC but was not aired in the United States until February 28, 1983 – the same night the final original episode of M*A*S*H ("Goodbye, Farewell and Amen") aired on rival network CBS. (ABC showed American Gigolo).

The fictional Madison Bridge is represented by the Astoria-Megler Bridge on the Columbia River, the longest continuous truss bridge in North America.

== Plot ==
Engineer Cal Miller's unauthorized attempt to close off the dangerously unstable Madison Bridge is foiled by the police pursuit of a robbery suspect. The chase ends in a multi-car accident in the middle of the bridge, which begins falling apart during the confusion. Miller organizes a rescue operation for the handful of bystanders who find themselves stranded with the armed suspect and a wounded policeman on a short stretch of crumbling pavement high atop a single collapsing pylon.

== Cast ==
- James MacArthur as Cal Miller
- Desi Arnaz Jr. as Johnny Pyle
- Char Fontane as Dee
- Richard Gilliland as Harvey Lewis
- Leslie Nielsen as Paul Warren
- Eve Plumb as Terry Kelly
- Barbara Rush as Elaine Howard
- Gregory Sierra as Diego Ramirez
- Philip Baker Hall as Warren Meech

== Production ==
The casting of Eve Plumb and Barbara Rush was announced in July 1979.

== Reception ==
The show fared poorly in the ratings against the last episode of M*A*S*H, which attracted the largest audience for any single show in television history. It had 10 percent of the viewers in New York, 12 percent in Los Angeles and 5 percent in San Francisco.
