= The Killer Elite =

1975 film by Sam Peckinpah

- US film poster
- Directed by: Sam Peckinpah
- Screenplay by: Marc Norman; Stirling Silliphant
- Based on: Monkey in the Middle by Robert Syd Hopkins (as Robert Rostand)
- Produced by: Martin Baum; Arthur Lewis
- Starring: James Caan; Robert Duvall; Burt Young; Bo Hopkins; Arthur Hill; Mako; Gig Young
- Cinematography: Philip Lathrop
- Edited by: Garth Craven; Tony de Zarraga; Monte Hellman
- Music by: Jerry Fielding
- Production companies: Exeter Associates; Persky-Bright Associates
- Distributed by: United Artists
- Release date: December 17, 1975 (New York)
- Running time: 122 minutes
- Country: United States
- Languages: English; Mandarin
- Budget: $5 million

The Killer Elite is a 1975 American action thriller film directed by Sam Peckinpah and written by Marc Norman and Stirling Silliphant, adapted from the Robert Syd Hopkins novel Monkey in the Middle. It stars James Caan and Robert Duvall as a pair of elite mercenaries who become bitter rivals and are caught on opposite sides of a proxy war over a foreign dignitary in the streets of San Francisco.

The cast also stars Mako, Arthur Hill, Bo Hopkins, Burt Young and Gig Young. Tom Clancy and Tiana Alexandra appear in their film debuts. The film represents the last collaboration between Peckinpah and soundtrack composer Jerry Fielding. It is considered to be among the first American films to feature ninjas.

The film received mixed reviews, with some critics perceiving Peckinpah as having "sold out" to commercial interests, while others criticized the film's use of martial arts tropes and imagery as contrived. Others, such as Pauline Kael, praised Peckinpah's direction and action sequences, and commended the film as a self-aware satire.

== Plot ==
Mike Locken and George Hansen are longtime friends and professional partners, agents of Communications Integrity (ComTeg), a private intelligence agency that handles covert assignments for the CIA. At the end of their latest assignment, Hansen betrays Locken by killing their client and shooting Locken in the knee and elbow, effectively "retiring" him. After months of painful rehabilitation, Locken wears metal braces, but is able to walk with a cane. Upon being released from the hospital, Locken moves in with his nurse, Amy, to continue his therapy. As months pass, Locken undergoes serious martial-arts training with a cane, becoming adept with it while vowing revenge against Hansen for his betrayal.

ComTeg deputy director Cap Collis refuses to put Locken back into the field again, assuming that he is only fit for a desk job. O’Leary, a CIA agent, hires ComTeg to protect Yuen Chung, a Taiwanese politician who arrived in the United States with a delegation that includes his daughter, Tommie. Chung has been targeted for assassination, and Hansen has been hired to carry out the assignment. Locken assembles his old team, including driver Mac and marksman Jerome Miller, but they do not know that Collis is in collaboration with Hansen, hoping to unseat current ComTeg director Lawrence Weybourne. Collis has hired two separate hit squads, one led by Hansen and one led by ninja Negato Toku, to eliminate Chung after the first ambush attempt failed, an arrangement that Hansen dislikes but with which he reluctantly complies when Collis gives him the next opportunity to kill Chung.

Hansen and his team launch an assault on Chung's safehouse, but Locken manages to protect the Chungs and lead their escape unscathed, lying low at a pier where Collis will extract Chung with a yacht the following day. When Locken tells Chung and Tommie to step in front of a highly visible window with its light illuminated, Mac accuses Locken of using their clients as bait to lure out Hansen, his real target. Later that night, Hansen sneaks into Chung's safehouse and takes Tommie hostage, getting Locken to disarm. He explains that he is working for Collis and argues that the shooting of Locken was not personal. He offers to give Locken a cut of the money, warning him that if he fails to kill Chung, more killers will be after them. Locken instead decides to walk away and take on Hansen another time. However, Miller shoots Hansen while he is distracted, killing him. Shocked and infuriated that he is unable to exact his revenge on the man who had crippled him, Locken punches Miller in the face.

Locken telephones Weybourne and tells him about Collis' treachery. Weybourne orders Locken to follow up with the rendezvous plans and tells him that if he provides evidence that Cap is the traitor, he can have Cap's job. The following day, Locken sails the yacht to the empty ships of the Naval Reserve Fleet at Suisun Bay and orders Chung and Tommie to stay aboard. Locken, Miller, Mac and a couple of other trusted ComTeg operatives board one of the ships and spot the ninjas crawling overhead. Collis appears and offers Locken a bribe, but Locken shoots him in the arm and kneecap, using the same lines that Hansen gave him when he betrayed him.

The ninjas attack, but Miller mows them down with his machine gun. He is then shot by a gunman, but not before shooting back, taking his killer with him. Tommie and Chung arrive, just as Toku arrives and challenges Chung to a duel. Locken wants to shoot, but Chung accepts the challenge and, after a short battle, kills Toku. Weybourne arrives with reinforcements and the remaining ninjas scatter. Mac accuses Weybourne of using them to do his dirty work, saying that he is no different than Cap, and tries once more to convince Locken to leave ComTeg and retire. Weybourne points out that a man like Locken has nothing else but his job. Locken declines Weybourne's job offer but keeps Collis' yacht and the bribe money as payment. He then sails away with Mac.

== Cast ==
- James Caan as Mike Locken
- Robert Duvall as George Hansen
- Arthur Hill as Cap Collis
- Mako as Yuen Chung
- Bo Hopkins as Jerome Miller
- Burt Young as Mac
- Gig Young as Lawrence Weybourne
- Tom Clancy as Dan O'Leary
- Tiana Alexandra as Tommie
- Kate Heflin as Amy
- Takayuki Kubota as Negato Toku
- Victor Sen Yung as Wei Chi
- Helmut Dantine as Vorodny
- Sondra Blake as Josephine
- Walter Kelley as Walter
- Hank Hamilton as Hamilton
- Carole Mallory as Rita
- James Wing Woo as Tao Yi
- George Kee Cheung as Bruce
- Tom Bush as Sam
- Uschi Digard as Girl at Party
- Kuo Lien Ying as Tai Chi Master

== Production ==
The Killer Elite was based on the novel Monkey in the Middle (later republished under the film's title) by Robert Syd Hopkins under the pseudonym Robert Rostand.

The film was partly made with British finance.

Sam Peckinpah was assigned to direct The Killer Elite by United Artists head Mike Medavoy, who believed in Peckinpah's abilities but knew that it was virtually impossible for Peckinpah to obtain a job with any of the studios, as he had alienated many people in Hollywood. When the project came along, Medavoy knew that it was perfect for Peckinpah and gave it to him under the conditions that he work under Medavoy's strict supervision; Peckinpah agreed.

The film was shot in March and April 1975 in San Francisco, with additional filming on location in Los Angeles. Locations included the San Francisco Yacht Club, Pier 70, the Golden Gate Bridge, the Marin Headlands, San Francisco International Airport, Chinatown, Portsmouth Square and the Suisun Bay Reserve Fleet. The building that explodes in the film's opening was an abandoned fire-department station located on the Embarcadero. It was to be demolished by the city for the Embarcadero Center redevelopment project, and Peckinpah changed the film's shooting schedule to take advantage of the event. Shots of the explosion were filmed from the Hyatt Regency San Francisco hotel across the street.

The film marked the film debuts of Tom Clancy, better known as a singer and stage actor, and Tiana Alexandra, who was cast after karate expert Hank Hamilton, an advisor on the film, brought her to the producers' attention. She was a brown belt at the time, and she and her husband, writer Stirling Silliphant, were students of Bruce Lee. One report suggests that Alexandra was only hired after Silliphant insisted that his work on the film was contingent on her hire.

== Reception ==
Richard Eder of The New York Times wrote, "Sam Peckinpah knows how to make movies but perhaps he has forgotten why. At least that is the feeling given by this bag of mixed, often damp fireworks about the alienation of people who do dirty tricks for the Central Intelligence Agency and discover that the tricks as well as the dirt are on them." Roger Ebert of the Chicago Sun-Times gave the film 2.5 stars out of 4 and opened his review by stating, "Sam Peckinpah's 'The Killer Elite' is directed and acted with a certain nice style, but it puts us through so many convolutions of the plot that finally we just don't care." Gene Siskel of the Chicago Tribune awarded the same 2.5-star grade and criticized the "moralizing dialog" as well as "half-hearted martial arts battles" that "come off as a sop to the young kung-fu movie audience." Arthur D. Murphy of Variety called the film "... an okay Sam Peckinpah actioner ... Cast performs admirable against the programmer demands of the story." Kevin Thomas of the Los Angeles Times wrote that the film "... wastes the formidable talents of director Sam Peckinpah and James Caan, who heads a first-rate cast, on a trite and murky formula thriller plot usually relegated to the less ambitious TV movies."

The Washington Post praised the film as "... a disarmingly funny and sympathetic action-suspense melodrama" and noted, "Neither the ads nor the opening wave of reviews have given the picture much credit for humor, which happens to be its strongest attribute." Pauline Kael of The New Yorker saw in the protagonist's rehabilitation "... an almost childishly transparent disguise for Peckinpah's own determination to show Hollywood that he's not dead yet ... Amazingly, Peckinpah does rehabilitate himself; his technique here is dazzling." Peckinpah's use of violence in the film, Kael continued, "... isn't gory and yet it's more daring than ever. He has never before made the violence itself so surreally, fluidly abstract; several sequences are edited with a magical speed—a new refinement." Tom Milne of The Monthly Film Bulletin wrote, "Craftily marrying the martial arts fad to the anti-CIA craze to produce a sort of Enter the Dragon meets Three Days of the Condor, the script is of course a mixture of opportunism and joke—as Peckinpah freely acknowledges with a deliriously absurd (yet splendid) final holocaust in which hordes of sword-carrying Japanese ambush, with highly predictable results, Americans armed to the teeth with machine-guns." Filmink claimed the film "feels like it was made by an exhausted cocaine addict doing it for cash (though Caan has some decent byplay with Robert Duvall at the beginning, demonstrating once more how much he rose when he had someone strong to bounce off)."

Japanese film director Shinji Aoyama listed The Killer Elite as one of the greatest films of all time in 2012. He said, "No other movie has taught me as much about human dignity as The Killer Elite."

In 1977, James Caan said he only made the film because his advisers told him to work with Peckinpah, and he rated it a zero on a scale to ten.

As of December 2024, Rotten Tomatoes gives it a 56% "fresh" rating from critics, and a 33% "rotten" rating from audiences, based on 16 reviews.

== Home media ==
The Killer Elite was released on DVD by MGM on April 1, 2003, as a French Blu-ray by Wild Side (under license from MGM) in 2013 and as a limited-edition Blu-ray by Twilight Time in the U.S. that includes a rare 1966 television adaptation of Noon Wine directed by Peckinpah for ABC-TV's Studio 67. The Twilight Time release also features an isolated soundtrack and an excerpt from the Peckinpah film biography Passion and Poetry.

== See also ==
- Point Blank
- List of American films of 1975
