= Tony Fontane =

American recording artist (1925–1974)

Tony Fontane (born Anthony Trankina; September 18, 1925 – June 30, 1974) was an American recording artist in the 1940s and 1950s who gave up his career in popular music to become a gospel singer. His clear tenor voice served as his most prominent feature. His career singing gospel music was successful in his day, leading him to performing in concert halls and churches around the globe and recording many albums.

== Biography ==
=== Early life ===
Tony Fontane was born Anthony Trankina on September 18, 1925, in Ann Arbor, Michigan, the son of Joseph and Raphaella Trankina. His father, a railroad worker for the Michigan Central Railroad, converted to Christianity in 1929 and a few years later moved the family to Grand Forks, North Dakota, where he operated a mission. The family lived in poverty, and Fontane grew up despising the mission and its work. It was during this time that he developed a strong hatred for all religions, embracing atheism.

From an early age, he showed an interest in singing. He became accomplished enough that he frequently sang in church services at the mission and, while still in high school, won the Dakota State Achievement award in a vocal contest. He was offered a musical scholarship at Michigan State University, but instead ran off with a dance band wearing a mascara mustache to disguise his age. Six weeks after a statewide alarm was issued, he was returned home.

=== Popular career ===
Fontane moved to Chicago to live with his aunt, and tried unsuccessfully to break into show business while still in high school. During World War II, he lied about his age to join the Coast Guard. After the war, he assumed the stage name of Tony Fontane and moved to New York City, looking for work as a singer, but did not have much success. He finally landed a spot on the Major Bowes Original Amateur Hour, which he won. Fontane became an instant sensation; according to his biography, A Bargain With God, he was one of only two performers on the Amateur Hour to ever be called back for an encore – the first being Frank Sinatra.

Moving once more to Chicago, Fontane appeared on television shows such as "Teen Town", "The Tony Fontane Show", and "Top Tunes With Trendler". He appeared on the shows of Ed Sullivan, Steve Allen, Paul Whiteman, and Eddie Bracken, and became a sought-after nightclub and Las Vegas act. A recording contract with Mercury Records led to his hit single, "Cold, Cold Heart" (Mercury 5693) in November 1951. While Tony Bennett took the song to number 1 on the pop chart that year, Fontane's version of the song reached number 28 on the Hit Parade, surpassing the version by Hank Williams, who wrote the song.

Fontane married actress Kerry Vaughn on May 2, 1950, and toured with her in Australia in the musical comedy, "Zip Goes a Million". Vaughn, a golden-haired beauty who once performed as a stand-in for Lana Turner and appeared in the cult classic "Prehistoric Women," became known in Australia as a second Marilyn Monroe. Vaughn and Fontane were popular abroad and appeared on the covers of many magazines. The couple had a daughter, Char Fontane (born January 12, 1952; died April 1, 2007).

=== Near-death experience and conversion ===
On the afternoon of September 3, 1957, Fontane finished a rehearsal for a television special at NBC and was driving to his home in Canoga Park, Los Angeles, California, when another motorist ran a red light and plowed into the driver's side of Fontane's sports car. It took rescue workers more than 2½ hours to extricate the singer from his vehicle; one person on the scene took his pulse and declared that he was dead. In fact, he was barely alive, and was rushed to the hospital where he remained in a coma, on the brink of death, for 30 days. His injuries included two broken legs, a crushed chest, massive head injuries, broken ribs, cracked vertebrae, and severe internal injuries.

Fontane later wrote that while he was in his coma, he had a vision that God came to him and offered him one more chance. When he came out of his coma, Fontane not only gave up atheism but converted to Christianity. When he abandoned his popular career and refused to sing anything other than gospel music, he was sued by the William Morris Agency for breach of contract and lost everything.

=== Gospel career ===
Once again living in extreme poverty, Fontane made the rounds of churches asking to sing for them. Fontane got his break in the gospel music industry when Phil Kerr, organizer of the Monday Night Musicals at the Pasadena Civic Auditorium, asked him to perform in concert, and following that appearance, Fontane became one of the busiest gospel singers in the world. He recorded albums, made a film about his life's story, and performed in churches, civic auditoriums, schools, military bases and concert halls.

Fontane continued his busy performance schedule throughout the 1960s and into the early 1970s, even traveling several times to Vietnam to sing for American troops stationed there. He also performed for four U.S. Presidents—Dwight D. Eisenhower, John F. Kennedy, Lyndon B. Johnson and Richard M. Nixon. But his life began to unravel in 1973 when he was diagnosed with prostate cancer and given only a year to live. Despite undergoing several unsuccessful operations, he continued to sing. Four days before his death, he went to an Orange County, California, church where two men—one on each side of him—helped stand him up for his last concert. He sang "Just As I Am". Two days later, his pancreas ruptured, and he was rushed to a Canoga Park hospital.

On June 30, 1974, Fontane died at the age of 48. He was buried at Forest Lawn Memorial Park.

== Discography ==
Although a small selection of his popular and gospel recordings are available in MP3 format online, the majority of Fontane's music may largely be found in antique stores and Internet auctions.

=== Albums ===
- The Touch of His Hand, RCA Victor LPM/LSP-2093, 1959
- He Leads Me, RCA Victor LPM/LSP-2215, 1960
- Tony Fontane Sings His Most Requested Hymns, RCA Victor LPM/LSP-2301, 1961
- Tony Fontane Sings the Songs from The Tony Fontane Story, RCA Victor LPM/LSP-2526, 1962
- The Hymns My Mother Sang, RCA Victor LPM/LSP-2751, 1963
- Tony Fontane Sings Concert Tour Favorites, RCA Victor LPM/LSP-2869, 1964
- An Evening Concert by Tony Fontane, RCA Victor LPM/LSP-3383, 1965
- Farther Than My Eyes Can See, RCA Victor LPM/LSP-3572, 1966
- Tony Fontane Sings of Decision-Comfort-Assurance, RCA Victor LPM/LSP-3800, 1967
- Tony Fontane with The Statesmen Quartet: Standing on the Promises, RCA Victor LPM/LSP-3939, 1968
