= Taps (film) =

1981 American drama film by Harold Becker

- Theatrical release poster
- Directed by: Harold Becker
- Screenplay by: Darryl Ponicsan; Robert Mark Kamen
- Adaptation by: James Lineberger
- Based on: Father Sky; 1979 novel by Devery Freeman
- Produced by: Howard B. Jaffe; Stanley R. Jaffe
- Starring: George C. Scott; Timothy Hutton; Ronny Cox; Sean Penn; Tom Cruise
- Cinematography: Owen Roizman
- Edited by: Maury Winetrobe
- Music by: Maurice Jarre
- Distributed by: 20th Century Fox
- Release date: December 18, 1981
- Running time: 126 minutes
- Country: United States
- Language: English
- Budget: $14 million
- Box office: $35.9 million

Taps is a 1981 American thriller drama film directed by Harold Becker, written by Robert Mark Kamen, James Lineberger, and Darryl Ponicsan, and based on Devery Freeman's 1979 novel Father Sky. The film stars George C. Scott and Timothy Hutton, with Ronny Cox, Tom Cruise, Sean Penn, Giancarlo Esposito, and Evan Handler in supporting roles. Hutton was nominated for a Golden Globe Award for Best Actor in a Motion Picture – Drama in 1982. The film's original music score was composed by Maurice Jarre. It was filmed at Valley Forge Military Academy and College.

The film follows a group of military school students who decide to take over their school to save it from closing. It was Penn's first film role, and Cruise's second and his first major role following a brief appearance in Endless Love a few months earlier.

== Plot ==
Bunker Hill Military Academy commander General Harlan Bache promotes cadet Brian Moreland to Cadet Major, the highest cadet rank. A day later Bache announces the school's board of trustees is selling the school to real estate developers, keeping the school open for one more year so seniors can graduate while the underclassmen find other schools. Bache and the cadets are hopeful they can save the school from closing permanently.

When the academy hosts a dance, local teenagers start a brawl outside with some of the cadets. Bache intervenes, and one of the boys seizes his service pistol, firing it accidentally and killing another boy. Bache is arrested, suffers a heart attack, and is hospitalized in critical condition. The board decides to close the school immediately.

Moreland and the cadet officers unanimously decide to take control of the campus. When the dean of students arrives with the local sheriff to empty the armory, they're confronted by an armed cadre of cadets led by Cadet Major Moreland. He demands to meet with Bache and negotiate with the board of trustees to keep the school open. The dean and sheriff are escorted off the academy, and armed cadets secure the perimeter.

A group of cadets restocks provisions from a local food supply warehouse, but one of their trucks breaks down. As Cadet Captain Dwyer attempts to fix the engine, local boys confront them, and hotheaded Cadet Captain David Shawn fires his M16 into the air. The locals scatter, and the cadets flee in a second truck, ramming a sheriff's car in the escape.

The police surround the campus, and a delegation of parents led by Moreland's father attempt to negotiate. To demonstrate that no one is being held against their will, Moreland assembles the cadets and offers them a chance to leave. All of them stay, and tensions rise when National Guard troops arrive with armored personnel carriers and tanks. Colonel Kerby, their commander, is respectful and empathetic toward the cadets, but negotiations fail.

At next morning's muster, the cadet officers report that some cadets have fled the campus. Moreland assembles the battalion and again offers cadets the opportunity to leave. Led by Moreland's friend, Lieutenant Edward West, at least half the remaining cadets leave. After their electricity and water are cut off, Cadet Captain J.C. Pierce is severely burned attempting to restart the school's gasoline-powered generator. They permit an ambulance to evacuate him to hospital. Moreland offers to stand down if the order comes from General Bache but is told that he died the previous night.

An M48 Patton tank rolls up to the main gate the next night, and one of the younger cadets on sentry duty panics. He drops his weapon while running to surrender, and it fires. The National Guard shoot back, killing another cadet. Moreland's resolve is shaken by the death, and he musters the remaining cadets to order them to surrender. The rebellious Shawn opens fire on the Guardsmen, wounding Kerby. The campus is overrun by the National Guard. In the ensuing firefight, Moreland enters Shawn's room to stop him, and they are killed by machine gun fire from the tank, ending the siege. The film ends with a flashback to the year's commencement ceremony, a reminder of the school's proud past.

== Cast ==
- George C. Scott as Brigadier General Harlan Bache
- Timothy Hutton as Cadet Major Brian Moreland
- Ronny Cox as Colonel Kerby
- Sean Penn as Cadet Captain Alex Dwyer (in his debut film role)
- Tom Cruise as Cadet Captain David Shawn
- Brendan Ward as Cadet Plebe Charlie Auden
- Evan Handler as Cadet First Lieutenant Edward West
- John P. Navin Jr. as Cadet Plebe Derek Mellot
- Billy Van Zandt as Cadet Bug
- Giancarlo Esposito as Cadet Captain J.C. Pierce
- James Handy as Sheriff
- Earl Hindman as Lieutenant Hanson
- Jeff Rochlin as Cadet Shovel
- Jess Osuna as Dean Ferris
- Wayne Tippet as Master Sergeant Kevin Moreland

== Reception ==
Film review aggregator Rotten Tomatoes reported that 69% of the 26 sampled critics gave the film a positive review. Film critic Roger Ebert gave the film 3 stars (out of four), comparing the film to the classic novel Lord of the Flies (1954).

The film earned North American rentals of $20.5 million.

== See also ==
- List of American films of 1981
