= A Long Way Home (1981 film) =

- Official release poster
- Genre: Drama
- Written by: Dennis Nemec
- Directed by: Robert Markowitz
- Starring: Timothy Hutton; Brenda Vaccaro; Rosanna Arquette; Paul Regina
- Music by: William Goldstein
- Country of origin: United States
- Original language: English

Production
- Executive producers: Tom Kuhn; Alan Landsburg
- Producers: Dennis Nemec; Linda Otto
- Cinematography: Donald H. Birnkrant
- Editor: Peter Parasheles
- Running time: 120 minutes
- Production company: Alan Landsburg Productions

Original release
- Network: ABC
- Release: December 6, 1981

A Long Way Home is a 1981 American made-for-television drama film directed by Robert Markowitz, written by Dennis Nemec, and starring Timothy Hutton, Brenda Vaccaro, and Rosanna Arquette. The film was nominated for two awards at the 40th Golden Globe Awards in 1982.

== Plot ==
As children, Donald, David and Carolyn are abandoned by their parents and placed in foster care by the government. About a decade later, Donald becomes determined to find his missing siblings. He has no idea where they are. A female counselor at the foster care breaks the rule and assists Donald in finding his long separated brother and sister who are now full adults.

== Cast ==
- Timothy Hutton as Donald Branch Booth
- Brenda Vaccaro as Lillian Jacobs
- Rosanna Arquette as Rose Cavanaugh
- Paul Regina as David Branch Czaky
- John Lehne as Riggins
- George Dzundza as Floyd Booth
- Bonnie Bartlett as JoAnn Booth
- Wil Wheaton as Donald Branch (Child)
- Brendan Klinger as David Branch (Child)
- Neta Lee Noy as Carolyn (Child)
- Lauren Peterson as Carolyn (Adult)
- Floyd Levine as Judge Sosna

== Reception ==
=== Reviews ===
The film received reviews from sources including Tom Shales of The Washington Post, The Christian Science Monitor, and The New York Times.

=== Awards and nominations ===
| Award | Category | Result |
|---|---|---|
| Golden Globe Award | Best Miniseries or Motion Picture Made for Television | Nominated |
| Golden Globe Award | Best Actor in a Miniseries or Motion Picture Made for Television | Nominated |
