= Tiana Alexandra =

Vietnamese-American actress, filmmaker and activist

Tiana Alexandra-Silliphant
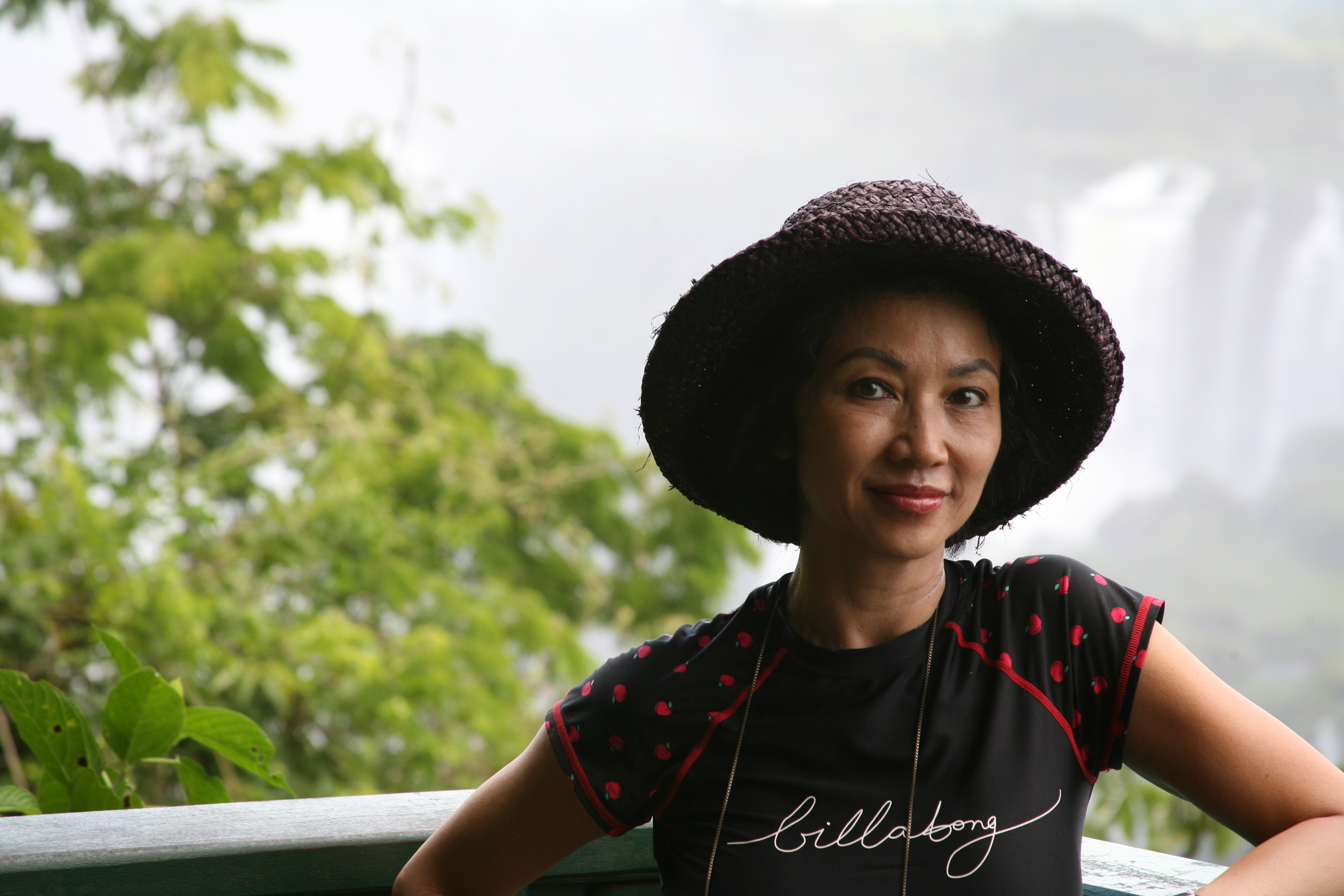
- Born: Du Thi Thanh Nga; 1951; Saigon, South Vietnam
- Citizenship: American
- Occupations: Filmmaker; Activist
- Known for: From Hollywood to Hanoi (1992)
- Spouse: Stirling Silliphant (m. 1974; died 1996)

Tiana Alexandra-Silliphant (born Du Thi Thanh Nga; born 1951 or 1952) is a Vietnamese-American actress, filmmaker, and activist. She is known for her 1992 documentary From Hollywood to Hanoi, the first American feature documentary filmed in Vietnam by a Vietnamese-American, which examines the aftermath of the Vietnam War and themes of reconciliation. She and Christopher Hampton are co-directors of Hampton-Silliphant Productions.

== Early life ==
Alexandra was born in Saigon, Vietnam. Her father, Du Phước Long, known as Patrick Du Phuoc Long, was a Vietnamese politician who served as Director of Press and Cultural Attaché in Washington, DC, under former South Vietnam's President Ngô Đình Diệm. After Diệm's assassination in 1963, the family moved to Fairfax, Virginia, in 1966. Her father later worked for the Voice of America and wrote The Dream Shattered: Vietnamese Gangs in America.

She attended Thomas Jefferson Junior High School in Arlington, Virginia, where she reportedly experienced racial discrimination. She studied martial arts under Bruce Lee and later trained with Jhoon Rhee. On July 4, 1974, she married producer Stirling Silliphant at Chasen's Restaurant in West Hollywood. Media reports noted that the event was attended by, among others, Robert Wagner, Natalie Wood, William Holden, and Henry Mancini.

== Career ==
=== Hollywood career ===
Her film debut was in Sam Peckinpah's The Killer Elite (1975), co-written by her husband, screenwriter Stirling Silliphant. Throughout the 1970s and 1980s, she appeared in films and TV, including Pearl (1978) and Fly Away Home (1981), which explored the human cost of the Vietnam War. She starred in Catch the Heat (1987) and co-produced Karatexercise, combining dance and martial arts. She was among the first Vietnamese-American actresses to join the Screen Actors Guild (SAG).

=== Music career ===
During the early 1980s, she produced pop songs and videos under the management of Bill Wyman of The Rolling Stones. Her tracks, including "Feel the Heat", were showcased on MTV. Her Bruce Lee tribute video, "Feel The Heat", was featured for the Academy of Motion Picture Arts and Sciences' 40th anniversary of Enter the Dragon.

=== From Hollywood to Hanoi ===
In 1992, Tiana Alexandra wrote, directed, and produced From Hollywood to Hanoi, which examines her perspective as a Vietnamese refugee and the long-term impacts of the Vietnam War in Vietnam and the United States. Executive produced by Oliver Stone, the film screened at the Sundance Film Festival and other venues. The documentary includes interviews with Vietnamese leaders, including General Võ Nguyên Giáp, and examines issues like Amerasian children and Agent Orange.

She has lectured at institutions including Bennington College, Bryn Mawr College, Harvard, Columbia, Notre Dame, USC, UC Berkeley, UC Santa Barbara, and Stanford. She was a panelist at "My Lai 25 Years After" at Tulane University and a Visiting Assistant Professor at Dartmouth College in 1993.

=== Ongoing projects ===
Since 1998, Tiana Alexandra has produced projects such as The Bomb Art Project and Bombs Away about unexploded ordnance in Laos and has documented Agent Orange victims, raising awareness of their plight. She worked with Christopher Hampton on A Dangerous Method (2011), Appomattox (2012), and the TV mini-series The Singapore Grip (2020).

== Filmography ==
As actress

- 1975: The Killer Elite – Tommie
- 1978: Pearl (TV Mini-Series) – Holly Nagata
- 1981: Fly Away Home (TV Movie) – Mai
- 1987: Catch the Heat – Checkers Goldberg
- 1987: The Three Kings (TV Movie) – Jan DuLong

As director

- 1992: From Hollywood to Hanoi
- 2017: The General and Me
- 2020: The Singapore Grip: Behind the Scenes

As producer

- 1992: From Hollywood to Hanoi
- 2011: A Dangerous Method (Associate producer)

Other performances

- 1986: Karatex
- 1992: From Hollywood to Hanoi

== Nominations ==
- 1993: Nominated for the "Grand Jury Prize" (Documentary) at the Sundance Film Festival for From Hollywood to Hanoi.
