= Stirling Silliphant =

American screenwriter (1918–1996)

- Silliphant, c. 1970
- Born: Stirling Dale Silliphant; January 16, 1918; Detroit, Michigan, U.S.
- Died: April 26, 1996 (aged 78); Bangkok, Thailand
- Education: University of Southern California (B.A., 1938)
- Occupations: Screenwriter, producer
- Known for: Naked City and In the Heat of the Night
- Spouse: Tiana Alexandra Du Long (m. 1974)
- Children: 3

Stirling Dale Silliphant (January 16, 1918 – April 26, 1996) was an American screenwriter and producer. He is best remembered for his screenplay for In the Heat of the Night, for which he won an Academy Award in 1967, and for creating the television series Route 66. Other features as screenwriter include the Irwin Allen productions The Towering Inferno and The Poseidon Adventure.

== Early life, family and education ==
Born in Detroit, Michigan, Stirling Silliphant was the son of Lemuel L. Silliphant, a Canadian who immigrated to the United States in 1911, becoming a US citizen in 1916. His mother was Ethel M. Silliphant. He had one brother, Leigh, who was three years younger. The family moved to Glendale, California when the brothers were young.

He was graduated from Hoover High School and the University of Southern California.

== Career ==
Silliphant was a film and television writer with more than 700 hours of prime-time television drama to his credit, many of which earned Emmys for their producers, directors, and cast members. However, he never received an Emmy personally as writer. Time in 1967 referred to him in a feature article with the statement: "The moving finger...having written, moved on!"

Production manager Sam Manners called him from the road unit of Route 66 from El Paso, Texas. He told Stirling they could save perhaps $100,000 if Stirling could write an extra story for the show that could be shot in El Paso while the production trucks and crew were there. Silliphant obliged, and had the script ready in a couple of days. The guest star was Albert Dekker, who was flown in to portray his part over the weekend.

Although he worked constantly in Hollywood, he had a well-known aversion against living in Southern California, where he had grown up. After he became successful, he built a house in Tiburon, California, and commuted regularly by air to Los Angeles.

=== Television ===
During World War II, Silliphant served as a lieutenant in the United States Army. Upon his discharge in 1946 in the earlier part of his career, he was publicity director for Walt Disney, and was lead writer on the stories incorporated into The Mickey Mouse Club. He produced several independent films such as 5 Against the House with Kim Novak, Huk! and Maracaibo. Later he broke into television, writing for the live Playhouse 90. Perry Mason and Alfred Hitchcock Presents soon followed.

Silliphant was known for his involvement in two TV series of the sixties, Route 66 and Naked City. Silliphant was quoted as saying that a number of his Naked City scripts were far superior to the script that won him the Oscar for In the Heat of the Night. He adapted eight half-hour episodes of Naked City into a tie-in paperback as well, which was published in 1959. One of his later series creations was Longstreet, which featured a blind detective played by James Franciscus, who had also starred in the first season of Naked City.

He wrote three television miniseries: Pearl (about the attack on Pearl Harbor), Space (based on the James Michener novel about America's early space program), and Mussolini: The Untold Story. He wrote the script for a never-produced TV miniseries of Atlas Shrugged, the novel by Ayn Rand.

=== Film ===
Silliphant wrote or co-wrote 47 feature films, including Maracaibo (produced and directed by and starring Cornel Wilde); the Jacques Tourneur noir Nightfall; Village of the Damned; the Charles Bronson spy thriller Telefon; The Liberation of L.B. Jones (director William Wyler's final film); The Killer Elite (directed by Sam Peckinpah); the Dirty Harry crime drama The Enforcer; The Towering Inferno, nominated for the Academy Award for Best Picture (1974); and the arm wrestling story Over the Top (starring Sylvester Stallone).

In addition to the Academy Award, In the Heat of the Night also earned Silliphant an Edgar Award from the Mystery Writers of America, for Best Motion Picture Screenplay. He helped to pull film concepts together. He penned the screenplay for Shaft in Africa, the third film in the Shaft series. With Chatrichalerm Yukol, he co-wrote the screenplay to the 1994 Thai action film, Salween.

He was a close friend of Bruce Lee, under whom he studied martial arts. Lee was featured in the Silliphant-penned detective movie Marlowe and four episodes of the series Longstreet. Silliphant reportedly recommended Lee for action choreography work. They had been working on a philosophical martial arts script, The Silent Flute (later known as Circle of Iron), which was to star Lee and James Coburn, and the pre-production even went to the extent of all three going to India on an unsuccessful location hunt. India was selected because Warner Brothers could not repatriate money their films generated in India due to foreign exchange regulations. The Siliphant, Coburn and Lee project was greenlit on the condition that the film would be shot in India to use the money unused in Warner's India accounts.

Silliphant's last screenplay was for the 1995 film The Grass Harp.

== Personal life and later years ==
Silliphant had a daughter, Dayle, and son, Loren (June 18, 1950 – February 12, 1969). Loren was shot and killed at age 18 by Chester Allen Johnson, who was found guilty of first-degree murder. Loren Silliphant was buried at Forest Lawn Memorial Park in Glendale, California.

In 1974, Silliphant married Tiana Alexandra Du Long, with whom he had a son, Stirling, and step daughter, Melissa.

Actor and martial arts expert Bruce Lee was a friend of Silliphant. Silliphant became interested in Lee's specialties, and with fellow actor James Coburn they worked on developing The Silent Flute. Silliphant later penned several projects that included Lee and his abilities. The first was Marlowe (1969), in which Lee portrays Winslow Wong, a hoodlum well versed in martial arts. Lee choreographed fight sequences for the film A Walk in the Spring Rain (1970). He played Li Tsung, a Jeet Kune Do instructor who teaches it to the main character in the TV show Longstreet (1971). Elements of his martial arts philosophy were included in the script.

In 1988, Silliphant moved to Bangkok. He died from prostate cancer on April 26, 1996, at the age of 78.

His work papers are archived at University of California, Los Angeles's Westwood campus.

== See also ==
- Charly
- Flowers for Algernon
- Daniel Keyes
- Manos: The Hands of Fate
