= Timothy Hutton =

American actor and director (born 1960)

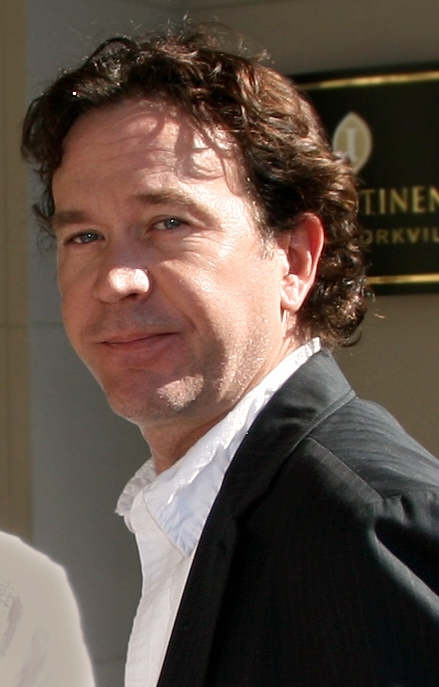
- Hutton in 2008
- Born: August 16, 1960 (age 66); Malibu, California, U.S.
- Occupations: Actor; film director
- Years active: 1965–present
- Spouses: Debra Winger (m. 1986; div. 1990) Aurore Giscard d'Estaing (m. 2000; sep. 2009)
- Children: 2
- Father: Jim Hutton

Timothy Hutton (born August 16, 1960) is an American actor. He is the youngest recipient of the Academy Award for Best Supporting Actor, which he won at age 20 for Ordinary People (1980). Hutton has since appeared regularly in feature films and on television, with notable roles including the drama Taps (1981), the spy film The Falcon and the Snowman (1985), and the horror film The Dark Half (1993), among others.

Between 2000 and 2002, Hutton starred as Archie Goodwin in the A&E drama series A Nero Wolfe Mystery. Between 2008 and 2012, he starred as Nathan "Nate" Ford on the TNT drama series Leverage. He also had a role in the first season of the Amazon streaming drama series Jack Ryan.

== Early life ==
Timothy Hutton was born in Malibu, California. His father was actor Jim Hutton; his mother, Maryline Adams (née Poole), was a teacher. His parents divorced when Hutton was three years old, and his mother took him and his older sister, Heidi, with her to Boston, and then to her hometown Harwinton, Connecticut. The family returned to California when Hutton was 12.

Due to his father's being a prominent film actor, Hutton was often thought to have grown up in the entertainment industry. But he told Bruce Cook of American Film magazine in 1981, "That's not how I grew up at all. My mother took us to Cambridge because she wanted to get her M.A." They later relocated to Berkeley, California.

In 1976, when Hutton was 15, he sought out his father and moved in with him in Los Angeles. At Fairfax High School, while playing Nathan Detroit in a school production of Guys and Dolls, he realized he wanted to become an actor. With encouragement from both of his parents, he began acting in television.

On June 2, 1979, Jim Hutton died in Los Angeles from liver cancer two days after his 45th birthday. In 1981, Hutton thanked his father during his Academy Award speech, which he had won for his role in the movie Ordinary People.

== Acting career ==
Timothy Hutton's career began with parts in several television movies, most notably the 1979 ABC TV film Friendly Fire. That year, he also played the son of Donna Reed in the Ross Hunter NBC television film The Best Place to Be. He then made two CBS made-for TV films in 1980: Young Love, First Love with Valerie Bertinelli, and Father Figure with Hal Linden. For his first feature film performance, as Conrad Jarrett in Ordinary People (1980), Hutton won both the Academy Award and the Golden Globe for Best Supporting Actor. His performance also earned him the Golden Globe Award for New Star of the Year in a Motion Picture – Male. Immediately following his success, he starred in the acclaimed 1981 ABC television film A Long Way Home co-starring Brenda Vaccaro.

Hutton's next feature film, Taps (1981, with George C. Scott, Sean Penn, and Tom Cruise), was popular with critics and audiences. But during the next several years, Hutton was featured in a string of commercially disappointing motion pictures, such as Iceman, Daniel, Turk 182, Made in Heaven, and Q&A, which struggled at the box office. In 1985 he co-starred with Penn in The Falcon and the Snowman, which earned a more positive reception.

In 1984, he directed the music video for the song "Drive" by The Cars.

In 1989, he made his Broadway stage debut opposite his Ordinary People co-star Elizabeth McGovern in the A.R. Gurney play Love Letters. He followed this with another Broadway role in the Craig Lucas hit comedy, Prelude to a Kiss, which also starred Mary-Louise Parker and Barnard Hughes.

During the late 1980s and into the 1990s, Hutton began to take large supporting parts in films, most notably in Everybody's All-American with Jessica Lange and Dennis Quaid and French Kiss with Meg Ryan and Kevin Kline. In 1996, he starred in the ensemble film Beautiful Girls playing opposite 14-year-old Natalie Portman in one of her early standout film roles.

Moving on to television, he starred as Archie Goodwin, an assistant to investigator Nero Wolfe in the A&E television series A Nero Wolfe Mystery (2001–2002) adapted from the novels by Rex Stout. Hutton also served as an executive producer for the series, and directed several episodes. His other directing credits include the family film Digging to China (1997). In 2001, Hutton starred in the television miniseries WW3, and in 2006 he had a lead role in the NBC series Kidnapped, playing Conrad Cain, the wealthy father of a kidnapped teenager. He appeared in 13 feature films from 2006 to 2008.

Hutton starred in the television series Leverage from 2008 to 2012, where he played former insurance investigator Nate Ford, who led a group of thieves who acted as vigilantes to help ordinary people against corporate and government injustice.

In 2014, Hutton was cast opposite Felicity Huffman in John Ridley's ABC crime drama American Crime.

== Other pursuits ==
In 2003, Hutton and restauranteur Philip Scotti were the new co-owners of P. J. Clarke's, a restaurant and bar in New York City.

Hutton starred in a Groupon commercial during the 2011 Super Bowl, which drew public ire for the parodying of the Tibetan resistance movement. The commercials were pulled from rotation on February 10 after continued negative response from the public and activist groups.

== Personal life ==
=== Marriages and relationships ===
Hutton has been married twice. His first marriage (1986–1990) was to actress Debra Winger; they had a son in 1987.

Hutton dated Elizabeth McGovern, Diane Lane, Patti Davis, Demi Moore, Mary-Louise Parker, Uma Thurman, and Angelina Jolie.

In 2000, he married illustrator Aurore Giscard d'Estaing, niece of former French president Valéry Giscard d'Estaing. Their son was born the following year, in Paris. In July 2009, Us Weekly reported that Hutton and Giscard d'Estaing had separated.

=== Legal issue ===
In November 2019, Sera Johnston, a former child model and actress, filed a criminal complaint with the Vancouver Police department accusing Hutton of raping her in 1983, when she was 14. Hutton, who was 22 when the alleged incident occurred, "completely and unequivocally" denied the accusations and filed a criminal complaint against Johnston for extortion. In July 2021, Canadian authorities closed their investigation into Johnston's accusations without filing charges.

== Filmography ==
Key
†	Denotes works that have not yet been released

=== Film ===
Year	Title	Role	Notes
1965	Never Too Late	Boy running to his father	Uncredited
1980	Sultan and the Rock Star	Paul Winters	
1980	Ordinary People	Conrad Jarrett	Academy Award for Best Supporting Actor; Golden Globe Award for Best Supporting Actor – Motion Picture; Golden Globe Award for New Star of the Year – Actor; Los Angeles Film Critics Association Award for Best Supporting Actor; Nominated—BAFTA Award for Most Promising Newcomer to Leading Film Roles; Nominated—National Society of Film Critics Award for Best Supporting Actor; Nominated—New York Film Critics Circle Award for Best Supporting Actor
1981	Teenage Suicide: Don't Try It!	Narrator	
1981	Taps	Cadet Major Brian Moreland	Nominated—Golden Globe Award for Best Actor in a Motion Picture – Drama
1983	Daniel	Daniel Isaacson	
1984	Iceman	Dr. Stanley Shephard	
1985	The Falcon and the Snowman	Christopher Boyce	
1985	Turk 182	Jimmy Lynch	
1987	Made in Heaven	Mike Shea/Elmo Barnett	
1988	A Time of Destiny	Jack	
1988	Betrayed	Juggler at the fair	Uncredited
1988	Everybody's All-American	Donnie "Cake" McCaslin	
1989	Torrents of Spring	Dimitri Sanin	
1990	Q&A	Asst. District Attorney Aloysius Francis Reilly	
1992	Strangers	Tom	
1993	The Temp	Peter Derns	
1993	The Dark Half	Thad Beaumont/George Stark	Fantafestival Award for Best Actor; Nominated—Fangoria Chainsaw Award for Best Actor
1995	French Kiss	Charlie Lytton	
1995	The Last Word	Martin Ryan	
1996	Beautiful Girls	Willie Conway	
1996	Mr. and Mrs. Loving	Richard Loving	Based on the true story of Mildred and Richard Loving, prosecuted for miscegenation in Loving v. Virginia
1996	The Substance of Fire	Martin Geldhart	
1997	City of Industry	Lee Egan	
1997	Playing God	Raymond Blossom	
1999	The General's Daughter	Col. William Kent	
1999	Deterrence	Marshall Thompson	
2000	Just One Night	Isaac Alder	
2002	Sunshine State	Jack Meadows	
2004	Secret Window	Ted Milner	
2004	Kinsey	Paul Gebhard	
2006	Last Holiday	Matthew Kragen	
2006	Stephanie Daley	Paul Crane	
2006	The Kovak Box	David Norton	
2006	Heavens Fall	Samuel Leibowitz	
2006	Falling Objects	Oscar Peters	Short film
2006	Off the Black	Mr. Tibbel	
2006	The Good Shepherd	Thomas Wilson	
2007	The Last Mimzy	David Wilder	
2007	When a Man Falls in the Forest	Gary	
2008	The Alphabet Killer	Richard Ledge	
2008	Reflections	Tom	
2008	Lymelife	Charlie Bragg	
2009	Broken Hill	George McAlpine	
2009	The Killing Room	Crawford Haines	
2009	Brief Interviews with Hideous Men	Subject No.30	
2009	Multiple Sarcasms	Gabriel	
2009	Serious Moonlight	Ian	
2010	The Ghost Writer	Sidney Kroll	
2013	Louder Than Words	Bruce Komiske	
2015	#Horror	Dr. Michael White	
2017	All the Money in the World	Oswald Hinge	
2018	Beautiful Boy	Dr. Brown	
2020	The Glorias	Leo Steinem	
†	The Long Home		Filmed in 2015

=== Television series ===
Year	Title	Role	Notes
1972	The Wonderful World of Disney	—N/a	Episode: "Dad, Can I Borrow the Car?"
1980	The Wonderful World of Disney	Paul Winters	Episode: "Sultan and the Rock Star"
1991	Books: Feed Your Head	Man reciting 'Forty Stories'	Episode: "Forty Stories"
2001–02	A Nero Wolfe Mystery	Archie Goodwin	20 episodes
2004	5ive Days to Midnight	J.T. Neumeyer	5 episodes
2006–07	Kidnapped	Conrad Cain	13 episodes
2008–12	Leverage	Nathan Ford	76 episodes Nominated—Saturn Award for Best Actor on Television (2009, 2011–13)
2015	Public Morals	Mr. O	2 episodes
2015	American Crime	Russ Skokie	11 episodes Satellite Award for Best Cast – Television Series; Nominated—Primetime Emmy Award for Outstanding Lead Actor in a Limited Series or Movie; Nominated—Satellite Award for Best Actor – Television Series Drama
2016	American Crime	Coach Dan Sullivan	10 episodes
2017	American Crime	Nicholas Coates	5 episodes
2018	Jack Ryan	Nathan Singer	5 episodes
2018–19	How to Get Away with Murder	Emmett Crawford	Main cast; season 5 (12 episodes)
2018	The Haunting of Hill House	Hugh Crain	6 episodes Nominated—Saturn Award for Best Supporting Actor in a Streaming Presentation
2019–20	Almost Family	Leon Bechley	13 episodes
2022	Women of the Movement	Jesse J. Breland	4 episodes
2023	S.W.A.T.	Mack Boyle	2 episodes
2026	The Night Agent	Senator George Lansing	1 episode

=== Television films ===
Year	Title	Role	Notes
1978	Zuma Beach	Art	
1979	Friendly Fire	John Mullen	
1979	The Best Place to Be	Tommy Callahan	
1979	And Baby Makes Six	Jason Cramer	
1979	Young Love, First Love	Derek Clayton	
1980	The Oldest Living Graduate	Cadet Whopper Turnbill	
1980	Father Figure	Jim	
1981	A Long Way Home	Donald Branch	Nominated—Golden Globe Award for Best Actor – Miniseries or Television Film
1993	Zelda	F. Scott Fitzgerald	
1996	Mr. and Mrs. Loving	Richard Loving	
1997	Dead by Midnight	John Larkin/Sam Ellis	
1998	Aldrich Ames: The Traitor Within	Aldrich Ames	
1998	Vig	Frankie	
2000	The Golden Spiders: A Nero Wolfe Mystery	Archie Goodwin	
2000	Deliberate Intent	Rod Smolla	
2001	WW3	Larry Sullivan	
2006	Avenger	Frank McBride	

=== Director ===
Year	Title	Notes
1984	Drive	Music video for The Cars
1986	Amazing Stories	Episode: "Grandpa's Ghost"
1997	Digging to China	Children's Jury Award; Chicago International Children's Film Festival
2001–02	A Nero Wolfe Mystery	7 episodes

== See also ==
- Lists of American actors
- List of oldest and youngest Academy Award winners and nominees – Youngest winners for Best Actor in a Supporting Role
- List of actors with Academy Award nominations
