= Char Fontane =

American actress (1952–2007)

- Fontane in Joe & Valerie, 1978
- Born: Kerry Charae Fontane; January 12, 1952; Los Angeles, California, U.S.
- Died: April 1, 2007 (aged 55); Marietta, Georgia, U.S.
- Occupation: Actress
- Years active: 1963–1989
- Spouses: Sergio Consani; Roy Yeager
- Children: 1
- Father: Tony Fontane

Kerry Charae "Kaci" Fontane (January 12, 1952 – April 1, 2007), known professionally as Char Fontane, was an American actress and singer.

== Early life and career ==
Born January 12, 1952, in Los Angeles, Fontane was the daughter singer Tony Fontane and his wife, actress Kerry Vaughn Fontane. Early in her career, Fontane worked as an assistant to a disc jockey in Los Angeles. Her first role was portraying her father as a young boy in the 1963 production The Tony Fontane Story. The movie told about her father's rise to popularity as a teen idol and his subsequent tragedies and successes. She also played herself as a child in the second half of the story.

She made guest appearances on several popular TV shows during the 1970s, including Love, American Style, Barnaby Jones, and The Love Boat. One of her most memorable performances was as a prostitute in the 1978 ABC television miniseries, Pearl. She starred in the 1983 TV movie The Night the Bridge Fell Down, and had a small role in the 1989 action film The Punisher. She also appeared on Broadway in Grease and toured in a production of Jesus Christ Superstar.

== Personal life and death ==
Fontane was married to musician Roy Yeager, a drummer who worked with several successful recording artists, including the popular 1970s group Lobo and country superstar Ronnie Milsap. He was also the drummer for the Atlanta Rhythm Section for several years. She had one child, Shaun Fontane, a son born to her and her first husband, Sergio Consani. In her later years, Fontane was an artist and interior designer.

Fontane died at age 55 on April 1, 2007, in Marietta, Georgia from breast cancer.

== Filmography ==
Film and Television
| Year | Title | Role | Notes |
|---|---|---|---|
| 1972 | Banyon | Helena Baxter | 1 episode: "Meal Ticket" |
| 1972 | Love, American Style | Lolita | 1 episode: "Love and the Confession" |
| 1973 | The F.B.I. | | 1 episode: "The Double Play" |
| 1978–79 | Joe & Valerie | Valerie Sweetzer | Main cast (8 episodes) |
| 1978 | Pearl | Shirley | TV miniseries |
| 1979 | Barnaby Jones | Candy Harper | 2 episodes: "Echo of a Distant Battle" (Parts 1 & 2) |
| 1979 | Supertrain | Cindy Chappel | 1 episode: "Express to Terror" |
| 1979 | $weepstake$ | Cathy | 1 episode: "Episode #1.8" |
| 1979 | The Love Boat | Stephanie Chapman | 1 episode: "The Stimulation of Stephanie" |
| 1981 | Nero Wolfe | Violet Crown | 1 episode: "Before I Die" |
| 1983 | The Night the Bridge Fell Down | Dee | TV movie |
| 1987 | Too Much | Dr. Finkel | Feature film |
| 1989 | The Punisher | Laurie Silver | Feature film |
