= Mid-South Fair =

Fair formerly held in Memphis, Tennessee, US

- Frequency: Annual
- Locations: Lander's Center in Southaven, Mississippi
- Years active: 169

The Mid-South Fair is a fair that was held for many years in Memphis, Tennessee, every year in late September and early October. It is now held in neighboring northwest Mississippi. It hosts many shows and attractions, as well as different types of rides and concession stands. Not only is it popular in the Memphis area, but also in the adjacent states of Mississippi and Arkansas, and even nearby Missouri. The fair's official website states, "As a non-profit organization, our mission is not to make money. Rather, the Fair exists to create a cultural and entertainment experience that exposes the people in our community to items and events they might not otherwise encounter. In addition, we serve as a focal point for all sorts of organizations and communities."

The event was last held in Memphis from September 19–28, 2008, in its 152nd year. The fair has been held at the Lander's Center in Southaven, Mississippi since September 2009.

== History ==
The Shelby County Agricultural Society agreed to host the second fair in the fall of 1856. During World War I, the military used the Mid-South Fair to find recruits. In 1908, the name was changed to the Tri-State Fair to encourage more people in areas around Memphis to attend the fair, but this name did not stick. In 1911, African American Memphians, not allowed to participate fully in the activities due to the Jim Crow laws and customs of the era, founded the Negro Tri State Fair, which was discontinued in 1959.

In 2008, the city of Memphis announced that it would not renew the fair's lease on the grounds, which is owned by the city. The fair then announced that it would move to the casino resort area in Tunica County, at a new site along U.S. Highway 61. The project was cancelled in 2009 due to poor economic conditions. The fair planned to temporarily use the Lander's Center in Southaven as a temporary host; however, due to the cancellation of the Tunica project, this location has been used since 2009. The fair lasts two weeks and begins the last weekend in September each year.

== Attractions ==
Events and attractions at the Mid-South Fair include a carnival midway and rides, concerts, a home-made ice cream contest, a horticulture contest, the Extreme Canines Stunt Dog Show, agricultural exhibits, a pig race, and the world's largest youth talent contest. Since being first held in 1953, entrants in the talent contest have included Mississippi natives Elvis Presley and Lance Bass and Tennessee native Justin Timberlake.
