= Tour of Duty season 1 =

Tour of Duty
- Season 1
- No. of episodes: 21

Release
- Original network: CBS
- Original release: September 24, 1987 – April 30, 1988

Season chronology
- Next → Season 2

This is a list of episodes from the first season of Tour of Duty with episode summaries.

== Production ==
=== Cast ===
- Terence Knox as SSG Clayton Ezekiel "Zeke" Anderson
- Stephen Caffrey as 2LT Myron Goldman
- Joshua D. Maurer as Roger Horn
- Steve Akahoshi as Randy "Doc" Matsuda
- Tony Becker as Daniel "Danny" Purcell
- Eric Bruskotter as Scott Baker
- Stan Foster as Marvin Johnson
- Ramón Franco as Alberto Ruiz
- Miguel A. Núñez Jr. as Marcus Taylor
- Kevin Conroy as CPT Rusty Wallace

=== Crew ===
Producers:

- Zev Braun – Executive producer
- Bill L. Norton – Co-executive producer
- Ronald L. Schwary – Producer
- Rick Husky – Supervising producer
- Steve Bello – Co-producer
- Steven Phillip Smith – Co-producer

Writers:

- Steve Duncan (2 episodes)
- L. Travis Clark (2 episodes)
- Bill L. Norton (3 episodes)
- Steven Phillip Smith (4 episodes)
- Rick Husky (3 episodes)
- Steve Bello (2 episodes)
- Brad Radnitz (1 episode)
- J. David Wyles (2 episodes)
- Robert Burns Clark (3 episodes)
- David Hume Kennerly (1 episode)
- Dennis Foley (1 episode)
- Jim Beaver (1 episode)
- Bruce Reisman (2 episodes)
- Christian Darren (1 episode)
- Peter Lubliner (1 episode)
- Ronald L. Schwary (1 episode)

Directors:

- Bill L. Norton (7 episodes)
- Aaron Lipstadt (2 episodes)
- Jim Johnson (2 episodes)
- Reynaldo Villalobos (2 episodes)
- Randy Roberts (2 episodes)
- Stephen L. Posey (2 episodes)
- Ronald L. Schwary (1 episode)
- Charles Correll (1 episode)
- Bill Duke (1 episode)
- James L. Conway (1 episode)
- Robert Iscove (1 episode)

== Episodes ==
No. overall	No. in season	Title	Directed by	Written by	Original release date	Rating/share (households)
1	1	"Pilot"	Bill L. Norton	Steve Duncan & L. Travis Clark	September 24, 1987	10.6/17
After Firebase Ladybird suffers heavy casualties, Sergeant Anderson (Terence Knox) goes to recruit new soldiers to replace men he lost. He selects the best from a group of new recruits and meets, for the first time, their new platoon leader, Second Lieutenant Goldman (Stephen Caffrey). Songs heard during this episode: Going Back Home - John Fogerty, Land of 1000 dances - Wilson Pickett, Its A Groove - Wilson Pickett, When I Was Young - Eric Bruden, All Along The Watchtower - Bob Dylan.
2	2	"Notes From the Underground"	Bill L. Norton	Bill L. Norton	October 1, 1987	10.3/17
The platoon gets attacked by the Viet Cong (VC), who strike and then disappear into tunnels. The GIs enter the tunnels to find the missing Taylor (Miguel A. Núñez Jr.), only to get trapped when the tunnel caves in. Songs heard during this episode: For What Its Worth – Buffalo Springfield, Wipe Out – The Surfaris, Reach Out I’ll Be There – The Four Tops.
3	3	"Dislocations"	Aaron Lipstadt	Steven Phillip Smith	October 8, 1987	12.0/19
Among the villagers being relocated by the platoon is a beautiful woman (guest star Tia Carrere) to whom Goldman (Stephen Caffrey) is attracted. When they are attacked on the trail, Goldman's life is saved by a VC, who turns out to be the woman's husband. Songs heard during this episode: People Get Ready – The Impressions, I’ve Come A Long Way – Wilson Pickett.
4	4	"War Lover"	Jim Johnston	Rick Husky	October 15, 1987	10.4/17
The men find themselves assigned to assist a "hot shot" sergeant (guest star William Russ) with a mission to destroy an enemy bridge. Tempers reach a breaking point when Anderson (Terence Knox) finds a Vietnamese child and the sergeant wants the child killed. Songs heard during this episode: Your Precious Love - Marvin Gaye / Tammi Tyrell, We Gotta Get Out Of This Place - The Animals, What’s Going On - Marvin Gaye.
5	5	"Sitting Ducks"	Aaron Lipstadt	Steve Bello	October 29, 1987	10.8/16
The company provides security for an irrigation project, but it seems the VC know the Americans' every move. The platoon is assigned a guide named Tran (guest star Mako), but every time the Americans leave the village, they are mysteriously ambushed. Songs heard during this episode: Louie Louie - Paul Revere & The Raiders, A Whiter Shade Of Pale - Procul Harum.
6	6	"Burn, Baby, Burn"	Reynaldo Villalobos	Story by : L. Travis Clark & Steve Duncan; Teleplay by : L. Travis Clark & Steve Duncan & Steven Phillip Smith	November 5, 1987	10.2/16
Racial tension leads to violence when a militant black soldier named Tucker (guest star Ving Rhames) and a white racist named Innes (guest star Mark Rolston) both end up in Bravo Company. When the white soldier is killed with a bayonet belonging to Johnson (Stan Foster), black and white members of the company clash. Songs heard during this episode: Mama Tried – M. Haggard (sung by the cast), Rock Me Baby - Otis Redding, Ball Of Confusion – The Temptations, Bad Moon Rising - Creedence Clearwater Revival.
7	7	"Brothers, Fathers and Sons"	Bill L. Norton	Bill L. Norton	November 12, 1987	9.5/14
Anderson (Terence Knox), Johnson (Stan Foster), and Baker (Eric Bruskotter) are shot down after catching a ride in a helicopter. As they head back to base, they encounter a woman giving birth as she is dying. Anderson ends up taking care of the baby, and the three soldiers end up battling with the VC—with tragic results. Songs heard during this episode: Rock A Bye Baby – performed by the cast (Stan Foster as Marvin Johnson), Baby Love – performed by the cast (Terence Knox as Zeke Anderson)
8	8	"The Good, the Bad and the Dead"	Reynaldo Villalobos	Brad Radnitz	November 19, 1987	10.8/17
A drunken GI steals a jeep and gets arrested. Anderson (Terence Knox) recognises him as his former drill sergeant Aubrey Decker (guest star Tim Thomerson). Anderson helps to get him acquitted and gets him drafted into the squad, but his old friend immediately begins to disobey orders. Songs heard during this episode: Spanish Eyes - Al Martino, Shapes of Things - The Yardbirds, Ring of Fire – Performed by the cast (Tim Thomerson as Aubrey Decker), Have You Ever Seen The Rain - Creedance Clearwater Revival.
9	9	"Battling Baker Brothers"	Bill L. Norton	Story by : Bill L. Norton; Teleplay by : Bill L. Norton & David Wyles	December 10, 1987	10.6/17
When Baker's (Eric Bruskotter) twin brother Karl (guest star Karl Bruskotter) shows up, the two end up fighting and nearly destroy the base. When his brother's helicopter goes down the next morning, Baker goes after him but gets captured by the VC. Songs heard during this episode: Baja Astronauts, My Girl - The Temptations, Soldier Boy - The Shirelles, My Girl Has Gone - The Miracles, I Get Around - The Beach Boys.
10	10	"Nowhere to Run"	Randy Roberts	Rick Husky	December 17, 1987	10.7/17
Purcell (Tony Becker) has just received a "Dear John" letter. After that, the bridge he was assigned to secure gets blown up. When he escorts a dying baby and its mother to a med evacuation center, Goldman (Stephen Caffrey) is reunited with an old flame; an Army nurse named Lt. Nikki Raines (Pamela Gidley). Songs heard during this episode: Your Precious Love - Marvin Gaye / Tammi Tyrell, Baby Please Don’t Go - Them, Here Comes The Night - Them, Tell It Like It Is - Aaron Neville, Something About You - The Four Tops.
11	11	"Roadrunner"	Jim Johnston	Robert Burns Clark	January 7, 1988	12.5/18
Anderson's (Terence Knox) confidence is shaken when he is almost killed by a barrage of mortar fire. When the soldiers are ordered to rescue downed pilots from an occupied valley, Anderson questions his ability to lead. Songs heard during this episode: Signed Sealed Delivered - Stevie Wonder, War - Edwin Starr, It Takes Two – Marvin Gaye & Kim Weston Performed by the cast (Tony Becker as Danny Percell & Miguel Nunez Jr. As Marcus Taylor), All Along The Watchtower - Jimi Hendrix.
12	12	"Pushin' Too Hard"	Bill L. Norton	Story by : David Hume Kennerly & Dennis Foley; Teleplay by : Steven Phillip Smith	January 14, 1988	11.7/17
Bravo company is sent on a reconnaissance mission to capture a prisoner. With them is an attractive female reporter named Vickie Adams (guest star Talia Balsam) who is intent on getting combat footage, but she quickly becomes a distraction to the men. Songs heard during this episode: Get Ready - The Temptations, Born To Be Wild - Steppenwolf, I’m Your Puppet - James and Bobby Purify, Bridge Over Troubled Water - Aretha Franklin.
13	13	"USO Down"	Ronald L. Schwary	Jim Beaver	January 21, 1988	11.5/17
A USO band, including three female dancers, are rushed to a helicopter to be flown to their next destination. The helicopter is shot down and the entire crew is killed, leaving the troupe's lives in the hands of Bravo Company. Songs heard during this episode: Wooly Bully - Sam The Sham & The Pharaohs (Performed by the cast), Just My Imagination - The Temptations , I’m A Man - Bo Diddley, Mannish Boy - Muddy Waters, We Gotta Get Out Of This Place - The Animals (Performed by the cast).
14	14	"Under Siege"	Stephen L. Posey	Story by : Steve Bello; Teleplay by : Steve Bello & Robert Burns Clark	February 11, 1988	12.5/19
A captain joins the platoon as the new leader and is immediately popular with the men. His arrival is fortuitous because there is evidence that the North Vietnamese Army (NVA) is planning a big push right over Firebase Ladybird. However, Anderson (Terence Knox) is wary of the new captain's tactics. Songs heard during this episode: Papa’s Got A Brand New Bag - James Brown.
15	15	"Soldiers"	Bill L. Norton	Rick Husky	February 18, 1988	11.9/17
Purcell (Tony Becker) is given emergency medical leave to visit his sick father in Hawaii. When he arrives, he learns his father has taken up with a much younger woman. Meanwhile, Taylor (Miguel A. Núñez Jr.) and Ruiz (Ramón Franco) get sent there for some R&R and witness negative reactions to the war. Songs heard during this episode: Dancing In The Street - Martha & The Vandellas, Come on Up - The Young Rascals, The Star Spangled Banner.
16	16	"Gray-Brown Odyssey"	Randy Roberts	Bruce Reisman	February 25, 1988	12.9/19
When Goldman (Stephen Caffrey) and Horn (Joshua D. Maurer) are ambushed in their jeep, their companions are killed and they are separated. Goldman is temporarily blinded, but Horn manages to capture a female VC, whom Goldman forces at gunpoint to lead him to safety. Songs heard during this episode: I Feel Good – James Brown.
17	17	"Blood Brothers"	Charles Correll	Christian Darren	March 12, 1988	9.0/16
Goldman's (Stephen Caffrey) estranged father arrives, a retired general on a fact-finding mission for Washington. Meanwhile, Ruiz (Ramón Franco) begins to suspect there is a heroin supplier on the base. Songs heard during this episode: Let’s Work Together - Wilbert Harrison, The Sun Is Shining - Elmore James, Let’s Work Together - Wilbert Harrison, Gloria - The Shadows Of The Knight, Sleepwalk - Santo & Johnny, You Can’t Hurry Love - Diana Ross and The Supremes.
18	18	"The Short Timer"	Bill Duke	Story by : Bruce Reisman & Peter Lubliner; Teleplay by : Bruce Reisman	March 19, 1988	10.5/18
Taylor (Miguel A. Núñez Jr.) must address his mixed emotions about his return home. His hatred for the war conflicts with the strong bond he has with his fellow soldiers and his uncertainty about life back home. Songs heard during this episode: We Gotta Get Out Of This Place - Performed by the cast, Detroit City - Bobby Bare, The Fightin’ Side Of Me - Merle Haggard, Hello Stranger - Barbara Lewis, Sock It To Me Baby - Mitch Ryder & The Detroit Wheels, Long As I Can See The Light - Creedence Clearwater Revival.
19	19	"Paradise Lost"	James L. Conway	Robert Burns Clark	March 26, 1988	9.8/19
The squad meets a mysterious ex-GI living among the natives. Goldman (Stephen Caffrey) follows orders to help fortify the natives against the VC, but what follows is exactly what the mystery man warned him about. Songs heard during this episode: Shoot Your Shot - Jr Walker & The All Stars, Hip Hug Her - Booker T & The MG’s, Please Please Please - James Brown.
20	20	"Angel of Mercy"	Bill L. Norton	Unknown	April 9, 1988	9.5/17
A wounded NVA colonel is captured by the platoon and Goldman (Stephen Caffrey) and Anderson (Terence Knox) are hit in a firefight. All three are taken to the nearby hospital, where Goldman once again meets up with his former girlfriend, Nurse Lt. Nikki Raines, and hears some unexpected news. Songs heard during this episode: Constipation Blues - Screamin Jay Hawkins, When A Man Loves A Woman - Percy Sledge.
21	21	"The Hill"	Robert Iscove	Steven Phillip Smith	April 30, 1988	8.3/15
Goldman (Stephen Caffrey) enjoys a brief R&R with Nikki, but she refuses to marry him. When he returns to base, he finds out his unit has been assigned to help take Hill 1000, which they have taken before and lost. Meanwhile, Horn (Joshua D. Maurer) refuses to follow orders at the risk of court martial. Songs heard during this episode: Your All I Need To Get By - Marvin Gaye & Tammy Tyrell, The Weight – The Band.
