= Tour of Duty season 3 =

Tour of Duty
- Season 3
- No. of episodes: 21

Release
- Original network: CBS
- Original release: September 23, 1989 – April 28, 1990

Season chronology
- ← Previous; Season 2

This is a list of episodes from the third and final season of Tour of Duty, along with episode summaries.

== Production ==
=== Cast ===
- Terence Knox as Clayton Ezekiel "Zeke" Anderson
- Stephen Caffrey as Myron Goldman
- Tony Becker as Daniel "Danny" Percell
- Stan Foster as Marvin Johnson
- Ramón Franco as Alberto Ruiz
- Miguel A. Núñez Jr. as Marcus Taylor
- Dan Gauthier as John McKay
- John Dye as Francis "Doc Hock" Hockenberry
- Kim Delaney as Alex Devlin (2 episodes)
- Carl Weathers as Colonel Carl Brewster
- Kyle Chandler as William Griner
- Lee Majors as Thomas "Pop" Scarlett
- Patrick Kilpatrick as Duke Fontaine
- Michael B. Christy as Major Duncan
- Charles Hyman as Sgt Marion Hannegan
- Alan Scarfe as Colonel Stringer
- Peter Vogt as General Elliott
- Greg Germann as Lt. Joseph Beller
- Maria Mayenzet as Sister Bernadette
- Michael Fairman as General Higgins
- Betsy Brantley as Jennifer Seymour (1 episode)
- Eric Bruskotter as Scott Baker (1 episode)
- Don Borza as Griff (1 episode)

=== Crew ===
Producers:

- Zev Braun - Executive Producer

Writers:

- L. Travis Clark (21 episodes)
- Steve Duncan (21 episodes)
- Robert Bielak (4 episodes)
- Brian Herskowitz (1 episode)

Directors:

- Jim Johnston (4 episodes)
- George Kaczender (3 episodes)
- Bradford May (3 episodes)
- Stephen L. Posey (3 episodes)
- James A. Contner (2 episodes)
- Randy Roberts (1 episode)
- Edwin Sherin (1 episode)
- Paul Lynch (1 episode)
- Helaine Head (1 episode)
- Steve Dubin (1 episode)
- Stephen Caffrey (1 episode)

== Episodes ==
No. overall	No. in season	Title	Directed by	Written by	Original release date	U.S. viewers (millions)	Rating/share (households)
38	1	"The Luck"	Stephen L. Posey	Jerry Patrick Brown	September 23, 1989	16.4	10.2/18
Anderson and Goldman are listed as MIA in the aftermath of an artillery strike. The platoon, McKay, and Alex Devlin deal with the loss in different ways. Johnson gets promoted to sergeant and has to fill in the shoes of Anderson. Alex Devlin wants to put Vietnam and Goldman behind her and accepts a position as correspondent in Paris. Anderson and Goldman in fact have been taken POW. In a stopover village, they figure out where they are and realize that they are being ferried northwards. They need to escape, because their chances to make it back to their own lines are dwindling. Songs heard during this episode: Twenty Five Miles - Edwin Starr, Cold Cold Heart - Ernest Tubbs, All Along The Watchtower - Jimi Hendrix.
39	2	"Doc Hock"	Randy Roberts	Robert Bielak	September 30, 1989	13.3	8.1/15
With Goldman recovering and transferring to Intelligence, Anderson meets the replacement Lieutenant Miller, who is keen on appearance by the book, which is something the new medic, Francis Hockenbury, takes lightly. Alex Devlin gets the rare opportunity to interview NVA General Thoc in a tunnel complex. After surviving a B-52 strike on the complex, she is happy to be back in Saigon and spend her last night with Goldman. Songs heard during this episode: Beautiful Morning - The Rascals, Voodoo Child - Jimi Hendrix, A Love Like Yours (Don’t Come Knocking Everyday) - Martha & The Vandellas, Since I Lost My Baby - The Temptations, Comin’ Back To Me - Jefferson Airplane.
40	3	"The Ties that Bind"	Stephen L. Posey	Carol Mendelsohn	October 7, 1989	15.0	9.3/17
The platoon is transferred to Camp Barnett MACV-SOG from where they will conduct unconventional warfare and counter-insurgency operations. Anderson is not extending his tour and uses his saved up free time to return to the US earlier to go see his daughter Katie for the first time in two years. The squads' first assignment is to snatch a VC tax collector. Goldman, mourning the loss of Alex Devlin, is distracted, and Johnson is trying to adjust to his role as the new "sarge". Songs heard during this episode: Love Man – Otis Redding, Grazin In The Grass – Hugh Masakela, Groovin’ – The Rascals.
41	4	"Lonely at the Top"	Edwin Sherin	David Kemper	October 14, 1989	10.9	6.9/12
The platoon is searching for a recon-squad that disappeared. During the various patrols, Johnson's leadership abilities are severely put to the test, and he has doubts whether he still has the edge. Anderson meets up with Jennifer Seymour and proposes to marry her. She says yes to share her life with him, but she also senses that Anderson isn't ready yet to end the life he shared with his men in Vietnam. Songs heard during this episode: Show Me – Joe Tex, Hot Fun In The Summertime - Sly & The Family Stone, Don’t Mess With Bill - The Marvelettes, Down In The Boondocks - Billie Joe Royal, Hungry - Paul Revere & The Raiders.
42	5	"A Bodyguard of Lies"	Jim Johnston	Brian Herskowitz	October 28, 1989	12.4	7.5/13
Lt. Beller, a close friend of Goldman, and his platoon will function as a blocking force, while Goldman's squad searches for weapon caches and flushes out the enemy in several villages. Beller is disillusioned, and his platoon is war weary, due to prolonged time in combat, suffering casualties, and not getting results. During a search, Anderson and Goldman hear gunfire, and they shortly after run into Beller, followed by a gruesome discovery in the nearby village of Phu An. Purcell is strung out from the war, and the upper- and downer-pills he is taking affects his performance and his mood. Songs heard during this episode: Twenty Five Miles - Edwin Starr, Crazy - Patsy Cline, Kicks - Paul Revere & The Raiders, What A Wonderful World - Louis Armstrong.
43	6	"A Necessary End"	Stephen L. Posey	Jerry Patrick Brown	November 4, 1989	12.5	7.7/13
The squad is deep in enemy territory, kidnapping a high-ranking NVA officer. Purcell is not with them, after spending the night in jail. He is fed up with the military and, despite Ruiz's efforts, deserts. McKay helps out an orphanage run by nuns. He is happy being useful in a different way for a change, until he witnesses a Buddhist commit suicide in the streets. The Army wants to keep the Phu An massacre quiet; Beller's platoon is dissolved, and Beller and his men are transferred to other units. Songs heard during this episode: Suzie Q - Creedance Clearwater Revival, Oh Sweet Nuthin - Velvet Underground, Pain In My Heart - Otis Redding.
44	7	"Cloud Nine"	George Kaczender	Robert Bielak	November 11, 1989	13.5	7.9/14
The guys yank Purcell out of Cholon. Although safe from being branded a deserter, he now has to face drug withdrawal symptoms for the next few days. The platoon is tasked with finding out how the NVA is getting truckloads of supplies into an area without roads. Colonel Brewster learns that the Army isn't doing anything regarding the massacre at Phu An and has no other option than to go to the press. Songs heard during this episode: White Rabbit - Jefferson Airplane, In A Gadda Da Vida - Iron Butterfly.
45	8	"Thanks for the Memories"	Paul Lynch	Carol Mendelsohn	November 18, 1989	14.1	8.5/15
With Thanksgiving as a backdrop; Colonel Brewster's decision to go to the press about the Phu An massacre lands him a lot of trouble with the higher echelon, especially when he goes on the record with journalist Sid Boyle. Purcell, after his cold turkey, is physically fine but psychologically still shaken. Goldman, Anderson, and the squad are gathering evidence for Colonel Brewster's theory that the NVA must have fuel storage dumps at regular intervals along the Ho Chi Minh trail. Songs heard during this episode: A Woman A Lover A Friend - Otis Redding, Once I Was – Tim Buckley.
46	9	"I Am What I Am"	Bradford May	David Kemper	December 2, 1989	11.2	7.1/12
Myron Goldman's father shows up, telling him he doesn't have long to live. After getting over the initial tension, they start talking and actually get to know each other for the first time in years. Johnson becomes a short-timer, and his friends in the platoon want to know his plans. Ruiz gets acquainted with Susana Lozada, an OR-assistant. The squad is preparing to get their hands on an enemy helicopter. Their orders are to destroy it, or if possible, fly it back, as McKay is joining the team. Purcell is also coming and keeps a low profile, but, after a little encouragement by "Doc" Hockenbury, he proves he hasn't lost his edge. Songs heard during this episode: Come On - Chuck Berry, Warm And Tender Love - Percy Sledge, Really - Bloomfield/Kooper/Stills.
47	10	"World in Changes"	Helaine Head	James Kearns	December 9, 1989	11.7	7.3/13
An elusive NVA sniper makes life hard for everybody, but particularly for McKay, as the sniper targets helicopters. The squad assists ruthless CIA-operative Duke Fontaine in removing an important VC official from the ranks. The mission becomes complicated when Taylor and Johnson, the latter three days short, are captured by the VC. Songs heard during this episode: I’m Gonna Lasso Santa Claus – Brenda Lee, How Much Can A Man Really Take - Jim Capaldi, We’re A Winner – The Impressions, Ballard Of Easy Rider – The Byrds.
48	11	"Green Christmas"	James A. Contner	Steven Phillip Smith	December 23, 1989	14.4	8.2/14
It's Christmas time, and the squad is making ready to celebrate and hand out presents to the children at the nearby orphanage. Johnson has returned home to his parents in Mississippi. His plan to study at a local university is not met with the favorable response he was hoping for. Songs heard during this episode: I’ll Be Home For Christmas – Bing Crosby, Jingle Bell Rock – Bobby Helms, Christmas Is Just Another Day – Ernest Tubb & The Texas Troubadors, Run Rudolph Run – Chuck Berry.
49	12	"Odd Man Out"	James A. Contner	David Ehrman	January 6, 1990	12.7	7.6/13
Taylor gets passed up for promotion to sergeant and, with Johnson back in the United States, he feels outnumbered and starts to associates himself with more radical Afro-Americans. However, the squads' latest mission, the liberation and safe return of the wife of a high ranking ARVN officer, puts things in perspective. Songs heard during this episode: Super Bad – James Brown, Soul Power – James Brown.
50	13	"And Make Death Proud to Take Us"	George Kaczender	Jerry Patrick Brown	January 20, 1990	13.2	7.9/13
When the team returns from a five-day jungle mission, they find the camp packed with newbies. Tet is approaching and Goldman's SOG-team is ordered to work with regular army units to eradicate the jungles around Saigon of enemy personnel. The team is charged with reconnoitering the jungles for NVA, based on Duke Fontaine's intelligence. Goldman's squad is to install sensors along trails, while Anderson's squad will use an abandoned outpost to monitor the area. Many kilometers away from support and each other, both Anderson and Goldman have their hands full in accomplishing their assignment and on-the-job-training of the new recruits. Songs heard during this episode: Fortunate Son - Creedence Clearwater Revival, One – Three Dog Night.
51	14	"Dead Man Tales"	Bradford May	Robert Bielak	February 3, 1990	12.8	7.7/13
Taylor gets his long awaited sergeant's stripes. The NVA sniper is still targeting Camp Barnett. Colonel Stringer launches a full scale attack after Major Duncan gets sniped. During the operation, several men of Goldman's platoon get killed by friendly fire from McKay's chopper. McKay feels immensely responsible and takes off by himself in the boonies to track and kill the sniper once and for all. Songs heard during this episode: Swinging Doors – Merle Haggard.
52	15	"Road to Long Binh"	Steve Dubin	David Kemper & Carol Mendelsohn	February 10, 1990	11.7	7.4/13
When food poisoning effectively puts the entire camp sick in their bunks, it is up to Anderson and Goldman to escort Staff Sergeant Jonathan Digby to Long Binh, where he will be court martialled for desertion. The long road trip allows everybody to get to know each other better, including that Sergeant Digby's reasons for desertion are not as straightforward as his military record says. Songs heard during this episode: I Got You (I Feel Good) - James Brown, Cast Your Fate To The Wind - Vince Guaraldi Trio, It’s Impossible - Unknown singer, Born Under A Bad Sign - Albert King.
53	16	"Acceptable Losses"	Bradford May	David Kemper & Carol Mendelsohn	February 17, 1990	13.2	7.9/14
Taylor & Ruiz get trapped behind enemy lines. Escaping and evading the enemy for days, they make their way to a suitable rendezvous point, only to find it crawling with NVA. Army life goes on for the rest of the team: Anderson receives his DSC, new recruits, including lifer Scarlet, come in, and sabotage missions are conducted. Duke Fontaine is thrilled when he learns he is "wanted dead or alive" by the NVA. Songs heard during this episode: You Don’t Miss Your Water - Taj Mahal, Hang On Sloopy - The McCoys, Albert’s Shuffle – Bloomfield/Kooper/Stills.
54	17	"Vietnam Rag"	George Kaczender	Robert Bielak	February 24, 1990	12.6	7.7/13
Taylor and Ruiz have been missing for three weeks. The Army might have forgotten about them, but the team has not. The influx of new recruits, the return to "Search and Destroy" type patrols, makes the men wonder what it is all about. The patrol is an accumulation of one accident after another: with newbies getting medevac-ed on a regular basis and the veterans grinding their teeth over the pointlessness. The situation is aggravated by the presence of photographer documenting every step and mishap. Songs heard during this episode: I Feel Like I’m Fixin To Die Rag – Country Joe McDonald and The Fish, Twenty Five Miles - Edwin Starr, On The Road Again – Canned Heat.
55	18	"War is a Contact Sport"	Stephen Caffrey	David Kemper	March 24, 1990	13.8	7.9/14
After an incident in the boonies, which leaves a GI dead, Hockenbury gets shunned by the others, and he gets transferred by Goldman. Hockenbury has got to come to terms with the fact that his ideals are not compatible with reality. Colonel Brewster has returned, leading the investigations into the Phu An massacre by Lt. Beller and his platoon. General Higgins is less than pleased by his presence. After three weeks of being listed as MIA: Taylor and Ruiz are united with their buddies. The platoon is tracking an NVA motorised supply column, but they find themselves scrambling for cover when an enemy tank enters the scene. Songs heard during this episode: Eve Of Destruction - Barry McGuire, It Takes Two - Marvin Gaye & Kim Weston.
56	19	"Three Cheers for the Orange, White & Blue"	Stephen L. Posey	Carol Mendelsohn	April 14, 1990	11.4	7.4/14
Goldman, Brewster, Beller, and other soldiers are questioned during an official inquiry into the Phu An massacre. Anderson is leading the team in the field, where they assist another SOG team. Robbie, the son of "Pop" Scarlet, is a member of the other team. The reunion is friendly, but Scarlet Senior is not happy with his son's aggressive attitude and trophy collecting. McKay is advising Hockenbury to make amends with others, because you need your buddies to make it through the war. Songs heard during this episode: I Won’t Go Huntin With You Jake - Jimmy Dean, Since I Lost My Baby - The Temptations, Tears Of Rage – The Band.
57	20	"The Raid"	Jim Johnston	Jim Johnston	April 28, 1990	12.7	8.1/15
(This episode was originally aired as a two-hour episode with "Payback" below) Colonel Brewster is putting together a POW rescue operation into North Vietnam. The training is intense. Former prisoner of the camp, Air Force Major Chapman, explains the layout of the facility and the horrifying details of the treatment by the prison guards. The execution of the operation is not exactly a success, with only one casualty, although "Pop" Scarlet and McKay do get seriously injured and Griner loses his eyesight. Unfortunately, the camp is empty, frustrating Duke Fontaine, who was very excited about this mission based on his intelligence gathering. Despite this, Major Chapman thanks the men, saying that other POWs will hear about this and draw strength from knowing that they are not forgotten. Danny Purcell and Alberto Ruiz have completed their tour of duty and fly home. Songs heard during this episode: Have You Ever Seen The Rain - Creedence Clearwater Revival, You’re Stronger Than Me - Patsy Cline, Wooly Bully - Sam The Sham & The Pharaohs, Last To Leave - Arlo Guthrie.
58	21	"Payback"	Jim Johnston	Jerry Patrick Brown	April 28, 1990	12.7	8.1/15
(This episode was originally aired as a two-hour episode with "The Raid" above) Back in the USA, Ruiz, Purcell, McKay, and Griner are adapting to civilian life, which is not easy. They all run into people who, in one way or another, do not want to know about the war or anybody involved with it. Hockenbury, while working in the dispensary, is shocked when he is told to give morphine to badly injured soldiers, effectively euthanizing them. Supply Sgt. Hannegan gets into an argument with a vengeful soldier. Goldman, Anderson, and Taylor have to deal with soldiers who either don't understand or don't care anymore. Songs heard during this episode: These Arms Of Mine – Otis Redding, I Fall To Pieces – Patsy Cline, Wooly Bully – Sam The Sham & The Pharaohs.
