= Tour of Duty season 2 =

Tour of Duty
- Season 2
- No. of episodes: 16

Release
- Original network: CBS
- Original release: January 3 – May 16, 1989

Season chronology
- ← Previous; Season 1 Next → Season 3

This is a list of episodes from the second season of Tour of Duty with episode summaries.

== Production ==
=== Cast ===
- Terence Knox as Clayton Ezekiel "Zeke" Anderson
- Stephen Caffrey as Myron Goldman
- Tony Becker as Daniel "Danny" Purcell
- Stan Foster as Marvin Johnson
- Ramón Franco as Alberto Ruiz
- Miguel A. Núñez Jr. as Marcus Taylor
- Kim Delaney as Alex Devlin
- Dan Gauthier as Johnny McKay
- Betsy Brantley as Jennifer Seymour
- Richard Brestoff as Major Darling

=== Crew ===
Producers:

- Zev Braun - Executive Producer
- Bill L. Norton - Co-Executive Producer
- Ronald L. Schwary - Producer
- Rick Husky - Supervising Producer
- Steve Bello - Co-Producer
- Steven Phillip Smith - Co-Producer

Writers:

- Rick Husky (2 episodes)
- Dennis Cooper (1 episodes)
- Steven Phillip Smith (1 episodes)

Directors:

- Bill L. Norton (2 episodes)
- Ed Sherin (2 episodes)

== Episodes ==
No. overall	No. in season	Title	Directed by	Written by	Original release date	U.S. viewers (millions)	Rating/share (households)
22	1	"Saigon: Part 1"	Bill L. Norton	Rick Husky	January 3, 1989	18.0	11.3/16
Bravo Co. is transferred to the Tan Son Nhut Base near Saigon. Zeke and Goldman find one of their men in an opium den, where they meet a female reporter, Alex Devlin, and a chopper pilot, Lieutenant Johnny McKay. Songs heard during this episode: Born To Be Wild - Steppenwolf, Come See About Me - Jr Walker & The All Stars, You’re All I Need To Get By - Marvin Gaye & Tammi Tyrell, Back In My Arms Again - The Supremes, Groovin’ - The Rascals.
23	2	"Saigon: Part 2"	Bill L. Norton	Rick Husky	January 10, 1989	14.6	9.6/14
As Goldman begins a relationship with Alex, Purcell becomes fed up with war and Ruiz is convinced that he is going to die. Johnson and Taylor check on a soldier, who may be faking his death. Songs heard during this episode: Get Ready - The Temptations, Searching For My Love - Bobby Moore & the Rhythm Aces, (Sittin’ On) The Dock of The Bay - Otis Redding, I Second That Emotion - The Miracles, Where Did Our Love Go - The Supremes, Come On Do The Jerk - The Miracles.
24	3	"For What It's Worth"	Ed Sherin	Dennis Cooper	January 17, 1989	14.3	9.6/14
Zeke goes to the hospital and ends up saving the life of psychiatrist Jennifer Seymour. But his budding relationship with Seymour is affected when he betrays her confidence in order to clear Taylor of a crime. Songs heard during this episode: Wild Thing - The Troggs, Fools Rush In - Rick Nelson.
25	4	"True Grit"	Ed Sherin	Steven Phillip Smith	January 24, 1989	15.5	10.2/15
Against Seymour's wishes, a soldier who has suffered a breakdown is sent back to the front and almost gets himself killed. Johnson meets up with Ling, who says she is pregnant with his child. Songs heard during this episode: Without The One You Love - The Four Tops, I Second That Emotion - The Miracles, Shotgun - Jr Walker & The All Stars.
26	5	"Non-Essential Personnel"	Jim Johnston	Elia Katz	January 31, 1989	13.0	8.4/13
McKay picks up the squad in his chopper, but, while rushing them back, Major Darling redirects him after some Viet Cong (VC). When Darling refuses McKay's request to fly back with the wounded, McKay does it anyway and is grounded. Songs heard during this episode: Hold On I’m Coming - Sam and Dave, It’s So Easy - Buddy Holly and The Crickets, I’m A Road Runner - Jr Walker & The All Stars, Faded Love - Patsy Cline.
27	6	"Sleeping Dogs"	Stephen L. Posey	Jerry Patrick Brown	February 7, 1989	15.3	10.0/15
During a mine sweeping patrol, the platoon becomes pinned down by a sniper. The sniper is killed by Sergeant Block, a sniper himself. In a follow-up counter sniper mission, it becomes clear that Block enjoys the killing and collects trophies. Anderson realises that Block is losing it and tries to make a deal to get him promoted and returned to the U.S. Songs heard during this episode: Running Scared - Roy Orbison, A Natural Woman - Aretha Franklin.
28	7	"I Wish It Would Rain"	Bradford May	Story by : Rick Husky & Dennis Cooper & Steven Phillip Smith; Teleplay by : Robert Burns Clark	February 14, 1989	14.4	9.2/14
The platoon is frustrated with the policy of not being allowed to pursue the enemy into Cambodia. Private Taft is hard hit when a fatally wounded friend begs him to kill him. Taft crosses the border to get revenge. Alex Devlin is interviewing an American businessman, who just obtained a fat government construction contract, much to the annoyance of Goldman. Taylor and Purcell find themselves in a lot of trouble in the wrong part of town. Songs heard during this episode: Beautiful Morning - The Rascals, I’m Sorry - Brenda Lee, In The Midnight Hour - Wilson Pickett, Sleepwalk - Santos & Johnny, Tell It Like It Is - Aaron Neville, Ooo Baby Baby - Smokey Robinson.
29	8	"Popular Forces"	Bill L. Norton	Story by : Dennis Cooper & Elia Katz & Jerry Patrick Brown; Teleplay by : Cynthia Darnell	February 21, 1989	13.7	9.2/14
Bravo Co. is training Regional Popular Forces and taking them on patrols. When confronted by a large North Vietnamese Army (NVA) force, the "Ruff-Puffs" do something unexpected. Alex Devlin is dropped off by McKay into a nearby hamlet for a story, but, when he comes to pick her up again, the village is torched and Alex is missing. Songs heard during this episode: Dedicated To The One I Love - Mamas and The Papas, I Was Made To Love Her - Stevie Wonder, Crossroads - Cream.
30	9	"Terms of Enlistment"	Charles Correll	Story by : Dennis Cooper; Teleplay by : Dennis Cooper & Rick Husky & Steven Phillip Smith & Jerry Patrick Brown Rick Husky	March 21, 1989	14.8	9.8/15
Taylor's wheeling and dealing abilities are put to the ulitmate test as he is putting together an Army vs. Air Force boxing match. Thayer is accused of being a homosexual and attempts a suicide; it is up to Dr. Seymour to pick up the pieces, just when she and Anderson are about to go to Tokyo, where Anderson is planning to propose marriage to her. To complicate matters, Dr. Seymour has been offered a military commission in the U.S. with the rank of Major. Songs heard during this episode: Knock On Wood - Eddie Floyd, Mustang Sally - The Young Rascals, Slip Away - Clarence Carter, Your Precious Love - Marvin Gaye & Tammi Tyrell, Turn Turn Turn - The Byrds.
31	10	"Nightmare"	Tommy Lee Wallace	Story by : Rick Husky & Dennis Cooper; Teleplay by : Bruce Reisman	March 28, 1989	13.3	9.2/14
McKay drops off Bravo Co. to retrieve the bodies of an overrun platoon. The squad comes under attack, the VC retreat, and Bravo gives chase. In a deserted village, it all comes down to that of an all out shootout, with the VC winding up dead. In the village, the men encounter a Quaker woman, who baffles them not only with her presence but also her philosophies. Purcell takes an interest in her, which becomes his undoing, as he saves her from being raped and faces homicide charges after she refuses to let go of her principles and testify that Purcell's action was self-defence. In the meantime, Mckay's helicopter is shot down; hurt and alone he must escape his attackers. The Army is about ready to list him as MIA, but Goldman is not. Songs heard during this episode: Standing In The Shadows Of Love - The Four Tops, It’s All Right - The Impressions, Gee Whiz - Carla Thomas, Do Right Woman Do Right Man - Aretha Franklin, Reach Out I’ll Be There - The Four Tops.
32	11	"Promised Land"	Helaine Head	Steven Phillip Smith	April 4, 1989	12.6	8.3/13
The Assassination of Martin Luther King Jr. creates racial tension both in the U.S. and Vietnam. While Zeke is escorting the body of his black friend Sergeant Art Binion back to the U.S. per the request of Binion's wife, Lieutenants Goldman and Douglas are struggling to keep their platoons together in different ways. After Douglas forces his men to follow an absurd order, he becomes the target of a "fragging". Zeke gives a moving speech during his friend's funeral in his home country, which is torn by political and racial turmoil. Songs heard during this episode: Fa-Fa-Fa-Fa-Fa (Sad Song) - Otis Redding, Wade In Water - Ramsey Lewis Trio, Have You Ever Seen The Rain - Creedence Clearwater Revival.
33	12	"Lonesome Cowboy Blues"	Charles Correll	W.K. Scott Meyer	April 11, 1989	14.0	9.6/15
Special Forces Sergeant Jackson's PX card shows up in the hands of a Vietnamese woman; Alex goes to find the woman in Saigon, while Zeke and Goldman are tasked with tracking down Jackson within the jungles of Vietnam. It's not an easy job, since the VC has a strong presence and seems to know every step the Americans make. Roselli, who just became a father, gets a helping hand from Purcell and Taylor in obtaining a safe, rear echelon job. Songs heard during this episode: Girl Watcher - The O’Kaysions, Purple Haze - Jimi Hendrix, Suzie Q - Dale Hawkins, Wrote A Song For Everyone - Creedence Clearwater Revival.
34	13	"Sins of the Fathers"	Jim Johnston	Rick Husky	April 25, 1989	14.8	10.4/18
Newbie Cassidy, with his lousy performance and racist remarks, isn't popular, yet Goldman covers for him. Zeke is thinking about returning to the U.S. after his next promotion, but he has doubts about what to do then and what awaits him. A string of serial murders on prostitutes points to Cassidy, but Alex Devlin has doubts. Songs heard during this episode: In The Midnight Hour - Wilson Pickett, Land Of A Thousand Dances - Wilson Pickett, Stand By Me - Ben E. King, Groovin’ (Instrumental) - The Rascals, Cloud Nine - The Temptations, Where Did Our Love Go - The Supremes, Born Under A Bad Sign - Albert King, My Girl - The Temptations.
35	14	"Sealed With a Kiss"	Stephen L. Posey	Story by : Dennis Cooper & Elia Katz; Teleplay by : Elia Katz	May 2, 1989	11.6	7.7/12
Zeke is helping Chrissie Pearson build a classroom to teach soldiers American literature and what civilian job opportunities there are when they return to the United States. Zeke runs into an old friend (Jim Doyle), who is also there to talk about a different kind of job, namely with private military companies. Anderson is at a crossroads, and he knows that he has got to make some choices. Amidst all this, Zeke and Goldman assist a Navy SEAL in the retrieval of documents from a downed helicopter. The SEALs irregular warfare raises some eyebrows. Songs heard during this episode: Mercy, Mercy, Mercy - The Buckinghams, Run Through The Jungle - Creedence Clearwater Revival, Theme From A Summer Place - Percy Faith, Our Day Will Come - Ruby & The Romantics.
36	15	"Hard Stripe"	Jim Johnston	Story by : Dennis Cooper & Jerry Patrick Brown; Teleplay by : Jerry Patrick Brown	May 9, 1989	N/A	N/A
In the middle of the jungle, the platoon runs into Jim Doyle (a CIA friend of Zeke) and two crates with new Russian sniper rifles. Doyle claims it is a coincidence that they've met again, claiming his contact failed to show up. On the way to the landing zone (LZ), they get ambushed by Montagnards, who are supposed to be friendly. Back at the base, Goldman and Zeke start poking around in Doyle's spooky/shady dealings. Songs heard during this episode: Wooden Ships - Crosby Stills & Nash, I’ve Been Lonely Too Long - The Rascals, People Get Ready - The Impressions.
37	16	"Volunteer"	Stephen L. Posey	Steven Phillip Smith	May 16, 1989	12.2	8.5/14
Supplies from the PX continuously wind up on the streets of Saigon. Lieutenant Camilla Patterson is in charge of the investigation, aided by Taylor. Desk clerk Sweet (Malcolm-Jamal Warner) is eager for combat and convinces Anderson to accept him into the platoon. During the next reconnaissance, the squad encounters a regiment of NVA and makes a hasty retreat. In the chaos, Zeke and Goldman are left behind; As they're about to be overrun, they have no other choice than to call in an artillery strike on their own position. Songs heard during this episode: You’ve Really Got A Hold On Me - Smokey Robinson, Time Has Come Today - The Chamber Brothers, I’m So Proud - The Impressions, Two Lovers - Mary Wells.
