= Julia Lupton =

American scholar of William Shakespeare and renaissance literature

- Born: 1963 (age 62–63)
- Education: Johns Hopkins University, Yale University
- Occupation: Professor

Julia Reinhard Lupton is an American scholar of William Shakespeare and renaissance literature. She is a professor of English at the University of California, Irvine and received a Guggenheim Fellowship for her scholarship.

== Early life and education ==
Lupton was born in Philadelphia, Pennsylvania and grew up in Baltimore, Maryland with her twin sister, Ellen Lupton.

Lupton earned a Bachelor of Arts in humanities and German from Johns Hopkins University in 1984 and a Ph.D. in renaissance studies from Yale University in 1991. Lupton credits graduate school with solidifying her commitment to writing about Shakespeare.

She is married to Kenneth Reinhard, professor of English and Comparative Literature at University of California, Los Angeles.

== Career ==
After graduating, Lupton became a professor of English at the University of California, Irvine in 1991. Lupton teaches classes on Shakespeare and renaissance literature. She is the co-director of the UCI New Swan Shakespeare Center, which she co-founded in 2015. And she is the director of UCI Illuminations, an initiative to fund arts and culture events for students and community members.

Lupton has served as trustee of the Shakespeare Society of America, associate dean for the University of California, Irvine's School of Humanities, director of UCI's program in Jewish studies, and director of UCI's Humanities Center.

From 2013- 2014, Lupton was a Guggenheim Fellow. Lupton has collaborated with her twin sister, graphic designer Ellen Lupton. Together, they wrote D.I.Y.: Design It Yourself and Design Your Life.

== Bibliography ==
- With Kenneth Reinhard: After Oedipus: Shakespeare in Psychoanalysis. Cornell University Press, 1993. ISBN 978-1888570359
- Afterlives of the Saints: Hagiography, Typology, and Renaissance Literature. Stanford University Press, 1996. ISBN 978-0804726436
- Citizen-Saints: Shakespeare and Political Theology. University of Chicago Press, 2005. ISBN 978-0226143521
- With Ellen Lupton: DIY Kids. Princeton Architectural Press, 2007. ISBN 978-1-56898-707-1
- With Ellen Lupton: Design Your Life: The Pleasures and Perils of Everyday Things. St. Martin's Press, 2009. ISBN 978-0312532734
- Thinking with Shakespeare: Essays on Politics and Life. University of Chicago Press, 2011. ISBN 978-0226496719
- Shakespeare Dwelling: Designs for the Theater of Life. University of Chicago Press, 2018. ISBN 978-0226540917
