= Ramon Franco =

Ramon Franco may refer to:

- Ramón Franco (actor) (born 1968), actor known for his portrayal of Alberto Ruiz in the TV series Tour of Duty
- Ramón Franco (1896–1938), Spanish pioneer of aviation
