= Maria Mayenzet =

American actress

Maria Mayenzet is an American actress of stage and film, film director, film producer, and educator.

== Life and career ==
Maria Mayenzet began her career as a stage actress, and in bit parts on television series. In 1978, she appeared on stage as Hippolyta in A Midsummer Night's Dream in the San Diego Shakespeare Festival at the Old Globe Theatre in San Diego. In 1979, Mayenzet appeared on stage as Isabelle in Measure for Measure with the Shakespeare Society of America at the Globe Playhouse in Los Angeles.

In 1985, Mayenzet had a major role in her first feature film as a murder victim in the 1985 thriller Jagged Edge which starred Jeff Bridges and Glenn Close. Mayenzet continued appearing on television sitcoms and dramas, and found a recurring role as a nun in the three-season long Vietnam War series, Tour of Duty. She also appeared in two episodes of the long-running Angela Lansbury mystery series Murder, She Wrote. She also cast as the lead in the daytime television special co-production between Televisa and Fox Television, Forever (1996), as an ex-convict seeking revenge. Forever (1996) was successful in Russia.

In 2016, the American Coast Theatre Company presented on stage, Life Without Parole, starring Mayenzet at the Edgemar Center for the Arts in Santa Monica, California.

She is a faculty member in the Cinema Television and Radio Department at Saddleback College in Mission Viejo, California, teaching performance for television and film and video production.

== Filmography ==
=== Film ===
- Jagged Edge (1985), as Page Forrester
- Messenger of Death (1988), as Esther
- Forever (1996), as Susan
- Dead Sexy (2001), as Patricia Pollard

=== Television ===
- Scarecrow and Mrs. King (1986)
- Tour of Duty (1987–1990, TV series), as Sister Bernardette
- Proud Men (1987 TV movie), as Adriane MacLeod
- Mancuso, F.B.I. (1990), as Czech secret police
