= Goldstein (film) =

- DVD cover
- Directed by: Philip Kaufman; Benjamin Manaster
- Written by: Philip Kaufman; Benjamin Manaster
- Produced by: Zev Braun; Philip Kaufman
- Cinematography: Jean-Phillippe Carson
- Edited by: Adolfas Mekas
- Music by: Meyer Kupferman
- Production companies: Montrose Film Productions; Braun Entertainment Group
- Distributed by: Altura Films International
- Release date: May 1964
- Running time: 85 minutes
- Country: United States
- Language: English

Goldstein is a 1964 film co-directed by Philip Kaufman and Benjamin Manaster, and produced by Kaufman and Zev Braun.

== Plot ==
The cast featured a number of actors from The Second City comedy troupe in a retelling of the story of Elijah.

== Cast ==
- Lou Gilbert as Old Man
- Ellen Madison as Sally
- Tom Erhart as Sculptor
- Ben Carruthers as Jay
- Charles Fischer as Mr. Nice
- Severn Darden as Doctor
- Anthony Holland as Aid
- Nelson Algren as himself
- Jack Burns as Truck Driver / Policeman
- Mike Turro as Guard
- Viola Spolin
- Del Close as Doctor

== Reception and legacy ==
It had earned praise by filmmakers Jean Renoir and François Truffaut (the former called it "the best American film I have seen in 20 years").

== Accolades ==
The film shared the Prix de la Nouvelle Critique at the Cannes Film Festival in 1964 with Bertolucci's Before the Revolution.

== See also ==
- Improvisational theatre
- Martin Buber
- Jewish folklore
