= Dan Gauthier =

American actor

- Born: Daniel Lester Gauthier; December 2, 1963 (age 62); Prineville, Oregon, U.S.
- Occupation: Actor
- Years active: 1987–present
- Spouse: Lisa Fuller
- Children: 1

Daniel Lester Gauthier (/ˈɡoʊtieɪ/; born December 2, 1963) is an American actor best known for his roles as Kevin Buchanan on the ABC soap opera One Life to Live, Matt Liston on the sitcom Ellen, Brad Powell in the 1989 film Teen Witch and Lt. John McKay of the military drama series Tour of Duty.

== Early life ==
Gauthier was born in Prineville, Oregon. He was inspired to act early on by his mother, who was a local theater actress in their Central Oregon home. By the time he turned 18, Gauthier moved to California to attend San Diego State University. He was recruited by SDSU's track team and was a decathlete. After college, Gauthier found work by modeling with the Ford and Nina Blanchard modeling agencies.

== Career ==
In 1987, he landed his first credited television role in 1987 in FOX's sitcom Married... with Children. Two years later, he starred in his first feature film, Teen Witch where he played the title character's love interest. That same year, he landed his most high-profile primetime role as maverick helicopter pilot, Johnny McKay in CBS's Tour of Duty. Following the end of the series, Gauthier continued to make guest appearances such television shows as Who's the Boss?, Life Goes On and Silk Stalkings. In 1993, he was cast in the comedy film Son in Law. He played Travis, the main character's steady boyfriend who reacts unhappily to her changes from college life. By 1995, he landed a regular role on a series titled Courthouse. The show portrayed the trials and tribulations of court life. After nine episodes, the series was canceled. From 1996 to 1997, Gauthier found recurring roles on both Ellen and Beverly Hills, 90210. He guest-starred as Chip on an episode of Friends. In 1998, he was cast in the prime time soap opera Melrose Place.

=== Daytime television ===
In June 2003, Gauthier became the eleventh actor to play former Lieutenant Governor Kevin Lord Riley Buchanan on the ABC soap opera One Life to Live, a role he portrayed until November 16, 2006. The character of Kevin had been a "good guy" for most of Gauthier's run, but in the last year had been written with more of a dark edge. The show chose not to renew Gauthier's contract and the character was written off; Gauthier was subsequently nominated for a Daytime Emmy Award for his performance. In August 2007, Gauthier made a brief return to One Life to Live for the series' 9,999th and 10,000th episodes. In 2025 he was cast in role of Peter Blake on Days of Our Lives.

== Filmography ==
=== Film ===
Year	Title	Role	Notes
1988	Meet the Munceys	Bruce Muncey	TV movie
1989	Teen Witch	Brad Powell	
1991	N.Y.P.D. Mounted	Lonnie "Lucky" Wellington	TV movie
1992	Shame	Danny Fiske	TV movie
1992	Saved by the Bell: Hawaiian Style	Brian Hanson	TV movie
1993	Son in Law	Travis	
1995	Excessive Force II: Force on Force	Francis Lydell	
1995	Illegal in Blue	Chris Morgan	Video
2000	The Right Hook	Dan	Short
2002	Groom Lake	Andy	
2003	Written in Blood	Mark Pearsall	
2005	Dating Games People Play	Stan	
2007	Army Guy	Joe	Short
2009	Forget Me Not	Zack Mitchell	
2012	Help for the Holidays	Scott VanCamp	TV movie
2014	BFFs	David	
2015	The Adventures of Sam Wolf	Patrick	Short
2017	A Million Happy Nows	Jason	
2017	First Strike Butcher Knife	-	Short
2019	A Daughter's Deception	Tom Caldwell	TV movie
2019	The Marcus Garvey Story	Edwin Kilroe	
2023	Every Breath She Takes	Kenny	TV movie
2023	Classmates	Harry	

=== Television ===
Year	Title	Role	Notes
1987	Married... with Children	Kelly's Boyfriend	Episode: "Poppy's by the Tree: Part 1 & 2"
1987	21 Jump Street	Mike Ogletree	Episode: "How Much Is That Body in the Window?"
1988	Punky Brewster	Kevin Dowling	Episode: "Crushed"
1989–1990	Tour of Duty	Lt. John McKay	Main Cast: Season 2-3
1991	Who's the Boss?	Pierce	Episode: "Selling Sam Short"
1991	Life Goes On	Josh Griffin	Episode: "Dueling Divas"
1992	Silk Stalkings	D.J. Martin	Episode: "Squeeze Play"
1993	Sisters	Kyle Parks	Recurring Cast: Season 4
1994	Star Trek: The Next Generation	Sam Lavelle	Episode: "Lower Decks"
1994	Winnetka Road	-	Episode: "The White Zone"
1995	Muscle	Kent Atkinson	Main Cast
1995	Courthouse	Jonathan Mitchell	Main Cast
1996	The Cape	-	Episode: "In Friends We Trust"
1996	Sliders	George Stellos	Episode: "The Prince of Slides"
1996–1997	Ellen	Matt Liston	Recurring Cast: Season 3, Guest: Season 4
1996–1997	Beverly Hills, 90210	Dick Harrison	Recurring Cast: Season 7
1997	Friends	Chip Matthews	Episode: "The One with the Cat"
1998	Melrose Place	Jeff Baylor	Recurring Cast (Season 6-7); 17 episodes
1998	Martial Law	Reed Paxton	Episode: "Funny Money"
1998	The Love Boat: The Next Wave	Eric	Episode: "Captains Courageous"
1999	Rude Awakening	Petey Peterson	Episode: "The Fix Up"
1999	Cupid	Tom Caighne	Episode: "Botched Makeover"
2000	Jesse	Dr. Jeff Hanson	Episode: "Kurt Slips, Niagara Falls"
2000	Nash Bridges	Jared Taylor	Episode: "El Diablo"
2001	Will & Grace	Curt	Episode: "Stakin' Care of Business"
2002	Charmed	Craig Wilson	Episode: "A Witch's Tail: Part 1"
2002	Still Standing	Steve Upton	Episode: "Still in School"
2003–2010	One Life to Live	Kevin Buchanan	Regular Cast
2004	Oliver Beene	Stan	Episode: "Girl Dad"
2004–2005	All My Children	Kevin Buchanan	Guest Appearances
2007	Supernatural	David McNamara	Episode: "Roadkill"
2008	The New Adventures of Old Christine	Brian	Episode: "Tie Me Up, Don't Tie Me Down"
2009	Lost	Co-Pilot	Episode: "Namaste"
2010	Make It or Break It	WineTaster	Episode: "Loves Me, Loves Me Not"
2010	No Ordinary Family	Detective Pierce	Episode: "No Ordinary Marriage"
2012	Hot in Cleveland	Nick	Episode: "Lost Loves"
2012	The Mentalist	Chip McGavin	Episode: "Black Cherry"
2014–2016	Faking It	Bruce Cooper	Recurring Cast: Season 1-2, Guest: Season 3
2016	Game Shakers	Dr. Levitz	Guest Cast: Season 1-2
2018	Criminal Minds	Ethan Howard	Episode: "The Tall Man"
2022	NCIS: Los Angeles	Carlyle Huntington	Episode: "Live Free or Die Standing"
2025–2026	Days of Our Lives	Peter Blake	

== Award nominations ==
- Soap Opera Digest Awards
  - (2005) Soap Opera Digest Award Outstanding Male Newcomer for One Life to Live
- Daytime Emmy Awards
  - (2007) Daytime Emmy Award Outstanding Supporting Actor for One Life to Live
