= The Oregon Trail (TV series) =

- Genre: Western drama
- Created by: Samuel A. Peeples; Michael Gleason
- Written by: E. Jack Neuman; Nicholas Corea
- Directed by: Bill Bixby
- Starring: Rod Taylor; Andrew Stevens; Darleen Carr; Charles Napier; Tony Becker; Gina Marie Smika
- Opening theme: "Oregon Bound" performed by Danny Darst
- Composer: Danny Darst
- Country of origin: United States
- Original language: English
- No. of seasons: 1
- No. of episodes: 13 (7 unaired)

Production
- Producers: Carl Vitale; Michael Gleason; Richard Collins
- Running time: 60 minutes
- Production company: Universal Television

Original release
- Network: NBC
- Release: September 21 – October 26, 1977

The Oregon Trail is an American Western television series aired on NBC from September 21 until October 26, 1977, except for its pilot episode that aired the previous year. The series was filmed in the Flagstaff, Arizona area.

== Synopsis ==
In the pilot, Evan was recently widowed and remarried. Evan's father was also recently widowed. Beginning with the series, the second wife had also died; Evan's love interest is now Margaret Devlin. The father character was dropped, and the scout character (Luther Sprague) was added.

== Cast ==
- Rod Taylor as Evan Thorpe
- Andrew Stevens as Andy Thorpe
- Gina Marie Smika as Rachael Thorpe
- Blair Brown as Jessica Thorpe (pilot)
- Darleen Carr as Margaret Devlin (main season)
- Douglas Fowley as Eli Thorpe (pilot)
- Charles Napier as Luther Sprague (main season)
- Tony Becker as William Thorpe

== Episodes ==
No. in season	Title	Directed by	Written by	Original release date
TVM	"The Oregon Trail"	Boris Sagal	Michael Gleason	January 10, 1976
1	"Hard Ride Home"	Burt Brinckerhoff & Herb Wallerstein	Michael Gleason & Eugene Price	September 21, 1977
2	"The Last Game"	Herb Wallerstein	Eugene Price	September 21, 1977
3	"The Waterhole"	Virgil W. Vogel	Story by : Parker Browning; Teleplay by : Nicholas J. Corea	September 28, 1977
Guest stars: Lonny Chapman and Kim Hunter
4	"Trapper's Rendezvous"	Hollingsworth Morse	Story by : William Kelley & Robert Boxberger & Nicholas J. Corea; Teleplay by : Nicholas J. Corea	October 12, 1977
Guest star: Claude Akins
5	"The Army Deserter"	Herb Wallerstein	Story by : Stanley Roberts & Eugene Price; Teleplay by : Eugene Price	October 19, 1977
Guest stars: Clu Gulager and Kevin McCarthy
6	"Hannah's Girls"	Don Richardson	Nicholas J. Corea	October 26, 1977
Guest star: Stella Stevens
7	"Return from Death"	Richard Benedict	Story by : John W. Bloch; Teleplay by : Robert Pirosh	UNAIRED (U.S.) November 23, 1977 (United Kingdom)
8	"The Scarlet Ribbon"	Bill Bixby	Story by : E. Jack Neuman; Teleplay by : Nicholas J. Corea	UNAIRED (U.S.) November 30, 1977 (United Kingdom)
Guest stars: Richard Jaeckel, Donna Mills, Bill Bixby and William Shatner
9	"The Gold Dust Queen"	William Wiard	Richard Collins	UNAIRED (U.S.) December 7, 1977 (United Kingdom)
Guest star: Susan Howard
10	"Return of the Baby"	Alan J. Levi	Story by : Lester William Berke & S.S. Schweitzer; Teleplay by : S.S. Schweitzer	UNAIRED (U.S.) December 14, 1977 (United Kingdom)
Guest stars: Kim Darby and Gerald McRaney
11	"Evan's Vendetta"	Paul Stanley	Nicholas J. Corea & John Austin; Based on a novel by Burt & Budd Arthur	UNAIRED (U.S.) January 17, 1978 (United Kingdom)
Guest star: William Smith
12	"Suffer the Children"	John C. Champion	Story by : Norman Jolley & Richard H. Bartlett & Robert Hamilton; Teleplay by : Robert Hamilton	UNAIRED (U.S.) January 24, 1978 (United Kingdom)
Guest star: Robert Fuller
13	"Wagon Race"	Lewis Allen	Elizabeth V. Wilson	UNAIRED (U.S.) January 31, 1978 (United Kingdom)
Guest stars: Mariette Hartley and Andrew Prine

== Production ==
Terry Wilson (Bill Hawks in Wagon Train) served as production supervisor on the series, and series stars Rod Taylor and Charles Napier co-wrote the theme song, "Oregon Bound", with singer Danny Darst.

The budget for the series was a reported $380,000 an episode.

NBC cancelled the show after six episodes, but the remaining seven episodes were later aired on BBC 2 in the UK, and the entire series was shown in the UK on BBC1 from November 1977 to January 1978.

== Release ==
=== Broadcast ===
NBC broadcast a single, 90-minute pilot episode in 1976. The series then ran 13 episodes during the 1977-1978 season.

=== Home media ===
On April 13, 2010, Timeless Media Group (TMG) released the show on six DVDs, running 750 minutes. The set includes 14 original episodes, including the feature-length pilot and the six episodes that did not air on NBC.
