= Illegal in Blue =

- Directed by: Stu Segall
- Written by: Noel Hynd
- Production companies: Met Productions Inc. Stu Segall Productions
- Distributed by: Stu Segall Productions
- Release date: 1995
- Running time: 90 minutes
- Country: United States
- Language: English

Illegal in Blue is a 1995 American direct-to-video action, crime, erotic thriller film directed by Stu Segall and starring Stacey Dash and Dan Gauthier.

== Plot ==
A cop taking personal leave after he witnesses money stolen from the police property room becomes involved with a beautiful singer who may have killed her husband.

== Cast ==
- Stacey Dash as Kari Truitt
- Dan Gauthier as Chris Morgan
- Louis Giambalvo as Lieutenant Cavanaugh
- Trevor Goddard as Mickey Fuller
- Michael Durrell as Michael Snyder
- Sandra Dee Robinson as Joanne
- David Groh as District Attorney Frank
- Michael Cavanaugh as Lieutenant Lyle
- Steven Ogg as Trevor Philips
- Eric Tagg as Bad Singer
