= Murder of Dawn Magyar =

American murder case

Dawn Magyar
- Born: Dawn Lee Swan; March 28, 1952; Corunna, Michigan, U.S.
- Died: January 27, 1973 (aged 20); Saginaw County, Michigan, U.S.
- Cause of death: Gunshot wounds
- Citizenship: United States
- Known for: Murder victim
- Spouse: Donald "Don" Magyar
- Children: 1

Dawn Lee Swan Magyar (March 28, 1952 – January 27, 1973) was an American woman found murdered in March 1973, in a wooded area in Chapin, Michigan. She had been reported missing since January 27, 1973, from her home in Chesaning, Michigan. Believed to have been abducted from a shopping center in nearby Owosso, she was found to have been raped and shot three times.

After a long investigation, new technology in DNA analysis enabled Shiawassee County, Michigan police to charge Jerald Leroy Wingeart in 2001, who was identified by DNA collected at the murder scene. In November 2001, he was tried and convicted in the case, and sentenced to life in prison. The case was closed more than 28 years after Magyar's body was found.

== Background ==
Magyar was born Dawn Lee Swan on March 28, 1952, in Corunna, Michigan, to parents Eleanor and Ralph Swan. She had brothers Max and Larry. The siblings grew up there and attended local schools; Swan graduated from the high school in 1970.

Dawn was married to Don Magyar. At the time of her murder, she was 20 years old, and they had just celebrated the first birthday of their son. They lived in Chesaning, Michigan.

== Murder ==
Magyar was believed to have been abducted on January 27, 1973, after grocery shopping in Owosso, Michigan, in Shiawassee County. She was last seen by a friend who briefly talked with her in the supermarket checkout line and saw her leave the store with her purchases.

After Magyar failed to return home that day, her husband reported her missing. The following day, police found the borrowed truck which she had been driving in the shopping center parking lot; her purchases were inside and her keys scattered at the truck, suggesting a forceful abduction. Despite a massive search of the area involving 4,000 local volunteers, Magyar was not found.

On March 4, her body was discovered by two young brothers, Wayne and Bill Somers, who were tapping maple trees on their family farm in Saginaw County, Michigan. The medical examiner found that Magyar had been raped and shot three times in the head and back with a .22 caliber gun. An autopsy indicated that she had likely been killed within 90 minutes of being abducted. The bullets came from two Remington and one Winchester brand ammo.

In June 1974, a .22 caliber revolver, believed to be the murder weapon, was recovered from the Shiawassee River in Owosso. The revolver was rusted and unable to fire, but still loaded. It contained three spent rounds that matched the brand of bullets that killed Magyar. The gun was traced to a pawn shop in Yuma, Arizona, where a man named Robert Shaw had purchased it in 1965. In 1976 Magyar's wallet and identification were found on the bank of the Shiawassee River, in the same area where the .22 gun had been found.

== Reopening ==
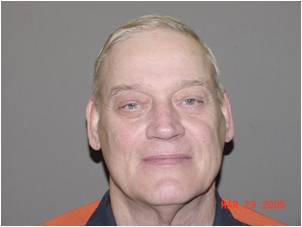
2005 mugshot of Jerald Wingeart

In 1995, the state police decided to reactivate the case. A detective sergeant reviewing cold cases realized that advances in DNA analysis (which had not been available as a forensic tool when the earlier investigation was conducted) might yield evidence to identify Magyar's killer, as the county police had collected sperm specimens from Magyar's body at the time of the crime. The Michigan State Police DNA Laboratory in East Lansing arranged for forensic DNA testing on this material to develop profiles of Magyar and her potential rapist and killer. They also arranged for testing by an independent laboratory. They renewed their search for the known men in Magyar's life.

In 1998, police located the gun's owner, Robert Shaw. He told authorities that he had owned the gun which they found, but that it had been lost many years before. He was cleared in the case by DNA testing. A few years later, Shaw told police that he remembered that, soon after they divorced, his ex-wife had dated a man named Jerald Leroy Wingeart. He said that Wingeart may have taken his gun at the time.

Police learned that Wingeart at age 20, then a married University of Michigan (U-M) engineering student with a scholarship, had been convicted in 1961 for the rape of a blind female U-M student and armed robbery of her escort in Ann Arbor Township, Washtenaw County, Michigan. He served six of an eight-year prison sentence and was released on parole in December 1967, and completed his parole in December 1969. He later worked as a long-haul trucker and lived in more than one state.

When police learned about him in relation to the Magyar case, Wingeart was 60 years old and living quietly in Center Line, Michigan, with his fourth wife. He had a grown daughter from a previous marriage. He worked at Chrysler's Sterling Heights Stamping Plant in the accounting office. Known for his computer skills, he was considered a respected member of his community.

== Arrest and conviction ==
As police investigated, they obtained Wingeart's DNA from saliva on cigarette butts which he had used and discarded in his trash. They found that his DNA matched the samples taken from the Magyar crime scene. They also determined that Wingeart had been in the Owosso area visiting a friend around the time of Magyar's murder. Unable to establish any link between Wingeart and Magyar, investigators believed that Wingeart had seen the young woman in the store or shopping center parking lot and randomly chose her as his victim.

On March 7, 2001, Wingeart, aged sixty, was arrested and charged with Magyar's murder. He could not be charged for kidnapping or rape because of the statute of limitations on those crimes, 10 and 6 years, respectively.

He was tried in November of that year at the Shiawassee County Courthouse. He claimed in his defense that he had had consensual sex with Magyar. But experts testified that Wingeart's DNA was left on Magyar during the brief timeframe that she went missing and was killed. On November 27, 2001, Wingeart was found guilty of first-degree felony and premeditated murder. In 2002 he was sentenced to life without the possibility of parole.

Magyar's mother Eleanor and brother Larry Swan and his wife were alive to see justice served for Dawn. Her father, Ralph Swan, had died in 1988.

Jerald Wingeart died in prison. His prison status was changed to discharged 8/20/2022 per MDOC records.

== Status of appeals ==
Wingeart's appeal of his conviction was rejected in 2003 by the Michigan Appeals Court, which affirmed the verdict. In May 2004 the Michigan Supreme Court denied his appeal of that ruling.

== Potential for new charges against Wingeart ==
At the time of his conviction, Wingeart was under investigation for deaths of young women and other crimes committed in Washtenaw and Ionia counties in the previous ten years. The Argus-Press reported in May 2004 that the Michigan Attorney General's office announced that it was reviewing the cold case of the April 7, 1979, rape and murder of 16-year-old Laura Mae McVeigh near Hubbardston, Michigan, in Ionia County, with the potential for bringing charges against Wingeart. Because he had never reached trial in the murder of McVeigh, double jeopardy prohibitions would not apply. The prosecutors were working with Michigan State Police and investigators from Ionia County.

In 1981 Wingeart had been arrested on charges related to McVeigh's death. He was living in Albany, New York at the time when he was arrested while returning home to visit his parents in Niles, Michigan, where he grew up, and had moved at least twice in the previous two years. The case was dismissed before trial in 1982 by the Wexford County, Michigan, judge, who ruled that the police had violated Wingeart's rights in the course of a search for evidence. At the time of McVeigh's murder, Wingeart was 38 and living in Eaton Rapids; he worked for the state government. He was known to have left the area after McVeigh disappeared and before her body was found, a month after her death; he moved to New York. Within two years, he had returned to Michigan. In 2004 police said they expected to make use of advances in DNA analysis and other forensic technology in their investigation.

== Representation in other media ==
- Magyar's case was detailed in TruTV's crime documentary series, The Investigators (also aired as Crime Stories), titled "The Disappearance of Dawn".
- The A&E Network series Cold Case Files also documented the case in Season 2, Episode 13, "Vintage Murder".
- Anthony "Tony" Hornus was a high school classmate of Dawn Magyar. He later became a reporter and covered the case for years for the Argus-Press (Owosso, Michigan). Based on his work, he wrote and co-directed the film An Ordinary Killer (2003), based on Magyar's murder. Jeff Kennedy also directed. The film starred Terence Knox, Dennis Haskins and Dan Haggerty. It was filmed at many of the locations related to the crime and investigation. Hornus also self-published a related book on the case, also entitled An Ordinary Killer (2008), developed from his screenplay and reporting.

== See also ==
- List of homicides in Michigan
- List of kidnappings
- List of solved missing person cases
