= Tour of Duty (TV series) =

American military drama TV series

- Title card (seasons 2–3)
- Genre: Military drama
- Created by: Steve Duncan; L. Travis Clark
- Starring: Terence Knox; Stephen Caffrey; Joshua D. Maurer; Steve Akahoshi; Tony Becker; Eric Bruskotter; Stan Foster; Ramón Franco; Miguel A. Núñez Jr.; Kevin Conroy; Kim Delaney; John Dye
- Music by: Joseph Conlan
- Country of origin: United States
- Original language: English
- No. of seasons: 3
- No. of episodes: 58

Production
- Executive producers: Steve Duncan; L. Travis Clark; Ronald L. Schwary
- Producer: Zev Braun
- Running time: 47–49 minutes
- Production companies: Zev Braun Productions; New World International

Original release
- Network: CBS
- Release: September 24, 1987 – April 28, 1990

Tour of Duty is an American military drama television series based on events in the Vietnam War, broadcast on CBS. The series ran for three seasons, from September 24, 1987, to April 28, 1990, for a total of 58 one-hour episodes. The show was created by Steve Duncan and L. Travis Clark and produced by Zev Braun.

The show follows an American infantry platoon on a tour of duty during the Vietnam War. It was the first television series to regularly show Americans in combat in South Vietnam and was one of several similarly themed series to be produced in the wake of the acclaimed Oliver Stone film Platoon (1986).

The series won an Emmy Award in 1988 for Outstanding Sound Mixing for a Drama Series, and it was nominated again in 1989 and 1990.

== Overview ==
Tour of Duty examined the issues of politics, faith, teamwork, racism, suicide, fragging, terrorism, civilian deaths, sexuality, drug abuse, and how the lives of soldiers and civilians were permanently affected by the Vietnam War.

The first season began in 1987 and followed Bravo company's second platoon located at Camp Ladybird. Second platoon was standard light infantry platoon conducting "search and destroy" missions in Vietnam, under the command of 2nd Lieutenant (1st Lieutenant from the start of season 2) Myron Goldman (Stephen Caffrey) and Staff Sergeant (later Sergeant First Class) Clayton 'Zeke' Anderson (Terence Knox). It was filmed on location in Hawaii at Schofield Barracks.

For the second and third seasons, the series was filmed at Indian Dunes/Newhall Orchards and Farms about 4 miles west of I-5/Santa Clarita, California between Hwy 126 and the Santa Clara River to reduce filming costs. This area was also used to film China Beach, Baa Baa Black Sheep and many other TV series and movies from the mid-1970s to 1990.

The change of location also led to a change in the show's direction. Beginning in the second season, the platoon was relocated to a base near Saigon, Tan Son Nhut. Production staff interviewed in Vietnam Magazine said this change in premise doomed the series because it shifted from being a realistic chronicle about the life of an average combat infantryman to an action/romantic/drama show. CBS wanted female characters because ABC had premiered China Beach, a Vietnam Army nurses drama, which was aimed directly at attracting more female viewers.

In Tour of Duty's third season, the remaining female character was killed off, and the platoon was transferred to a SOG unit at Camp Barnett, under the command of Colonel Brewster (played by Carl Weathers). The unit conducted covert operations in Vietnam and Cambodia which included a fictional version of the raid on Son Tay Prison. The show was cancelled at the end of this season due to falling ratings.

Guest stars included Lee Majors, James Hong, Mako, Kelly Hu, Angela Bassett, Ving Rhames, Melora Hardin, Everett McGill, Olivia d'Abo, Alfie Wise, David Alan Grier, Richard Brooks, Malcolm-Jamal Warner, William Sadler, Carl Weathers and Michael Madsen.

== Episodes ==
=== Series overview ===
Season	Episodes	Originally released	
Season	Episodes	First released	Last released
1	21	September 24, 1987	April 30, 1988
2	16	January 3, 1989	May 16, 1989
3	21	September 23, 1989	April 28, 1990

=== Season 1 (1987–1988) ===
No. overall	No. in season	Title	Directed by	Written by	Original release date	Rating/share (households)
1	1	"Pilot"	Bill L. Norton	Steve Duncan & L. Travis Clark	September 24, 1987	10.6/17
2	2	"Notes From the Underground"	Bill L. Norton	Bill L. Norton	October 1, 1987	10.3/17
3	3	"Dislocations"	Aaron Lipstadt	Steven Phillip Smith	October 8, 1987	12.0/19
4	4	"War Lover"	Jim Johnston	Rick Husky	October 15, 1987	10.4/17
5	5	"Sitting Ducks"	Aaron Lipstadt	Steve Bello	October 29, 1987	10.8/16
6	6	"Burn, Baby, Burn"	Reynaldo Villalobos	Story by : L. Travis Clark & Steve Duncan; Teleplay by : L. Travis Clark & Steve Duncan & Steven Phillip Smith	November 5, 1987	10.2/16
7	7	"Brothers, Fathers and Sons"	Bill L. Norton	Bill L. Norton	November 12, 1987	9.5/14
8	8	"The Good, the Bad and the Dead"	Reynaldo Villalobos	Brad Radnitz	November 19, 1987	10.8/17
9	9	"Battling Baker Brothers"	Bill L. Norton	Story by : Bill L. Norton; Teleplay by : Bill L. Norton & David Wyles	December 10, 1987	10.6/17
10	10	"Nowhere to Run"	Randy Roberts	Rick Husky	December 17, 1987	10.7/17
11	11	"Roadrunner"	Jim Johnston	Robert Burns Clark	January 7, 1988	12.5/18
12	12	"Pushin' Too Hard"	Bill L. Norton	Story by : David Hume Kennerly & Dennis Foley; Teleplay by : Steven Phillip Smith	January 14, 1988	11.7/17
13	13	"USO Down"	Ronald L. Schwary	Jim Beaver	January 21, 1988	11.5/17
14	14	"Under Siege"	Stephen L. Posey	Story by : Steve Bello; Teleplay by : Steve Bello & Robert Burns Clark	February 11, 1988	12.5/19
15	15	"Soldiers"	Bill L. Norton	Rick Husky	February 18, 1988	11.9/17
16	16	"Gray-Brown Odyssey"	Randy Roberts	Bruce Reisman	February 25, 1988	12.9/19
17	17	"Blood Brothers"	Charles Correll	Christian Darren	March 12, 1988	9.0/16
18	18	"The Short Timer"	Bill Duke	Story by : Bruce Reisman & Peter Lubliner; Teleplay by : Bruce Reisman	March 19, 1988	10.5/18
19	19	"Paradise Lost"	James L. Conway	Robert Burns Clark	March 26, 1988	9.8/19
20	20	"Angel of Mercy"	Bill L. Norton	Unknown	April 9, 1988	9.5/17
21	21	"The Hill"	Robert Iscove	Steven Phillip Smith	April 30, 1988	8.3/15

=== Season 2 (1989) ===
No. overall	No. in season	Title	Directed by	Written by	Original release date	U.S. viewers (millions)	Rating/share (households)
22	1	"Saigon: Part 1"	Bill L. Norton	Rick Husky	January 3, 1989	18.0	11.3/16
23	2	"Saigon: Part 2"	Bill L. Norton	Rick Husky	January 10, 1989	14.6	9.6/14
24	3	"For What It's Worth"	Ed Sherin	Dennis Cooper	January 17, 1989	14.3	9.6/14
25	4	"True Grit"	Ed Sherin	Steven Phillip Smith	January 24, 1989	15.5	10.2/15
26	5	"Non-Essential Personnel"	Jim Johnston	Elia Katz	January 31, 1989	13.0	8.4/13
27	6	"Sleeping Dogs"	Stephen L. Posey	Jerry Patrick Brown	February 7, 1989	15.3	10.0/15
28	7	"I Wish It Would Rain"	Bradford May	Story by : Rick Husky & Dennis Cooper & Steven Phillip Smith; Teleplay by : Robert Burns Clark	February 14, 1989	14.4	9.2/14
29	8	"Popular Forces"	Bill L. Norton	Story by : Dennis Cooper & Elia Katz & Jerry Patrick Brown; Teleplay by : Cynthia Darnell	February 21, 1989	13.7	9.2/14
30	9	"Terms of Enlistment"	Charles Correll	Story by : Dennis Cooper; Teleplay by : Dennis Cooper & Rick Husky & Steven Phillip Smith & Jerry Patrick Brown Rick Husky	March 21, 1989	14.8	9.8/15
31	10	"Nightmare"	Tommy Lee Wallace	Story by : Rick Husky & Dennis Cooper; Teleplay by : Bruce Reisman	March 28, 1989	13.3	9.2/14
32	11	"Promised Land"	Helaine Head	Steven Phillip Smith	April 4, 1989	12.6	8.3/13
33	12	"Lonesome Cowboy Blues"	Charles Correll	W.K. Scott Meyer	April 11, 1989	14.0	9.6/15
34	13	"Sins of the Fathers"	Jim Johnston	Rick Husky	April 25, 1989	14.8	10.4/18
35	14	"Sealed With a Kiss"	Stephen L. Posey	Story by : Dennis Cooper & Elia Katz; Teleplay by : Elia Katz	May 2, 1989	11.6	7.7/12
36	15	"Hard Stripe"	Jim Johnston	Story by : Dennis Cooper & Jerry Patrick Brown; Teleplay by : Jerry Patrick Brown	May 9, 1989	N/A	N/A
37	16	"Volunteer"	Stephen L. Posey	Steven Phillip Smith	May 16, 1989	12.2	8.5/14

=== Season 3 (1989–1990) ===
No. overall	No. in season	Title	Directed by	Written by	Original release date	U.S. viewers (millions)	Rating/share (households)
38	1	"The Luck"	Stephen L. Posey	Jerry Patrick Brown	September 23, 1989	16.4	10.2/18
39	2	"Doc Hock"	Randy Roberts	Robert Bielak	September 30, 1989	13.3	8.1/15
40	3	"The Ties that Bind"	Stephen L. Posey	Carol Mendelsohn	October 7, 1989	15.0	9.3/17
41	4	"Lonely at the Top"	Edwin Sherin	David Kemper	October 14, 1989	10.9	6.9/12
42	5	"A Bodyguard of Lies"	Jim Johnston	Brian Herskowitz	October 28, 1989	12.4	7.5/13
43	6	"A Necessary End"	Stephen L. Posey	Jerry Patrick Brown	November 4, 1989	12.5	7.7/13
44	7	"Cloud Nine"	George Kaczender	Robert Bielak	November 11, 1989	13.5	7.9/14
45	8	"Thanks for the Memories"	Paul Lynch	Carol Mendelsohn	November 18, 1989	14.1	8.5/15
46	9	"I Am What I Am"	Bradford May	David Kemper	December 2, 1989	11.2	7.1/12
47	10	"World in Changes"	Helaine Head	James Kearns	December 9, 1989	11.7	7.3/13
48	11	"Green Christmas"	James A. Contner	Steven Phillip Smith	December 23, 1989	14.4	8.2/14
49	12	"Odd Man Out"	James A. Contner	David Ehrman	January 6, 1990	12.7	7.6/13
50	13	"And Make Death Proud to Take Us"	George Kaczender	Jerry Patrick Brown	January 20, 1990	13.2	7.9/13
51	14	"Dead Man Tales"	Bradford May	Robert Bielak	February 3, 1990	12.8	7.7/13
52	15	"Road to Long Binh"	Steve Dubin	David Kemper & Carol Mendelsohn	February 10, 1990	11.7	7.4/13
53	16	"Acceptable Losses"	Bradford May	David Kemper & Carol Mendelsohn	February 17, 1990	13.2	7.9/14
54	17	"Vietnam Rag"	George Kaczender	Robert Bielak	February 24, 1990	12.6	7.7/13
55	18	"War is a Contact Sport"	Stephen Caffrey	David Kemper	March 24, 1990	13.8	7.9/14
56	19	"Three Cheers for the Orange, White & Blue"	Stephen L. Posey	Carol Mendelsohn	April 14, 1990	11.4	7.4/14
57	20	"The Raid"	Jim Johnston	Jim Johnston	April 28, 1990	12.7	8.1/15
58	21	"Payback"	Jim Johnston	Jerry Patrick Brown	April 28, 1990	12.7	8.1/15

== Characters ==
Character	Actor	Rank(s)/Job	Seasons		
Character	Actor	Rank(s)/Job	1	2	3
Main cast
Clayton Ezekiel "Zeke" Anderson	Terence Knox	Staff Sgt. (SSG)/Sgt. 1st Class (SFC)	Main	Main	Main
Myron Goldman	Stephen Caffrey	2nd Lt./1st Lt.	Main	Main	Main
Daniel "Danny" Percell	Tony Becker	PFC/Cpl./SP4	Main	Main	Main
Alberto Ruiz	Ramón Franco	Pvt./PFC/SP4	Main	Main	Main
Marcus Taylor	Miguel A. Núñez Jr.	Pvt./PFC/SP4/Sgt.	Main	Main	Main
Marvin Johnson	Stan Foster	SP4/Sgt.	Main	Main	Main (Note: Not main cast for the whole season.)
Scott Baker	Eric Bruskotter	Pvt./SP4	Main		Guest
Roger Horn	Joshua D. Maurer	Pvt./PFC/SP4	Main		
Randy "Doc" Matsuda	Steve Akahoshi	SP4	Main		
Rusty Wallace	Kevin Conroy	Captain	Main		
Johnny McKay	Dan Gauthier	1st Lt.		Main	Main
Alex Devlin	Kim Delaney	Reporter		Main	Main
Francis "Doc Hock" Hockenbury	John Dye	PFC/SP4			Main
Supporting cast
Nikki Raines	Pamela Gidley	2nd Lt.	Recurring		
Dalby	Bruce Gray	Lt. Col.	Recurring		
Darling	Richard Brestoff	Major		Also starring	
Dr. Jennifer Seymour	Betsy Brantley	Civilian Contracted Psychiatrist / then Major U.S. Army Medical Corps		Recurring	Recurring
Marion Hannegan/Putman	Charles Hyman	Master Sergeant (as Hannegan), SFC (as Putnam)		Recurring	Recurring
Mike Duncan	Michael B. Christy	Major			Also starring
Sister Bernardette	Maria Mayenzet	Civilian Nun			Also starring
Stringer	Alan Scarfe	Colonel			Also starring
Jack Elliot	Peter Vogt	General			Also starring
Edward Higgins	Michael Fairman	Major General			Also starring
William Griner	Kyle Chandler	Pvt.			Recurring
Duke Fontaine	Patrick Kilpatrick	CIA Agent			Recurring
Joseph "Skip" Beller	Greg Germann	1st Lt.			Recurring
Carl Brewster	Carl Weathers	Colonel			Special Guest Star
Thomas "Pop" Scarlett	Lee Majors	Private			Special Guest Star

== Music ==
The opening theme song was an abbreviated version of the Rolling Stones hit "Paint It Black" that had featured in the end titles of the 1987 Vietnam War film Full Metal Jacket; this was removed for the US DVD release. The closing consisted of an instrumental, synthesized tune with a distinctive Asian sound mixed in with acoustic guitar; it was performed by Joseph Conlan, and was never released for public consumption other than in the series. That music was used as background music for most of the series. On the US DVD release, most of the Vietnam War–era popular songs were replaced by instrumental bits to cover the blank spots of music.

All three seasons that have been released in the United Kingdom feature the complete original soundtrack, including "Paint It Black".

The show was known for its classic American rock soundtrack including Creedence Clearwater Revival, Jimi Hendrix, and Jefferson Airplane. One first-season episode, "USO Down", used "live" versions of "Wooly Bully", and "We Gotta Get Out of This Place" as performed by a USO band, the latter song being used also for ironic comment. The songs in this episode were retained in the DVD soundtracks. But for copyright reasons, the VHS and DVD soundtracks of the majority of episodes were replaced with soundalikes, a move which was widely protested by buyers and resulted in a significantly lower sales volume for the third-season DVD set than for the first two.

In the Netherlands, amongst other European nations, a total number of seven albums were released, containing most of the songs featured on the show. As a result, "Paint It Black" was re-released as a single, again hitting the number 1 position in the Dutch top 40 pop charts in May 1990.

=== The original soundtrack albums ===
The Tour of Duty television series soundtrack was released by CBS on Columbia Records as four different compilation albums during 1988 and 1989. The original albums are now out of print. Their track listings are as follows:

Tour of Duty Soundtrack, Volume 1 (1988): 1. "Baby Love" – Diana Ross and The Supremes; 2. "Here Comes the Night" – Them; 3. "We Gotta Get Out of This Place" – The Animals; 4. "A Whiter Shade of Pale" – Procol Harum; 5. "Itchycoo Park" – Small Faces; 6. "All Along the Watchtower" – The Jimi Hendrix Experience; 7. "Hurdy Gurdy Man" – Donovan; 8. "Time of the Season" – The Zombies; 9. "And When I Die" – Blood, Sweat & Tears; 10. "War" – Edwin Starr; 11. "Ball of Confusion" – The Temptations; 12. "What's Going On" – Marvin Gaye; 13. "Time Has Come Today" – The Chambers Brothers; 14. "I Want to Take You Higher" – Sly and the Family Stone; 15. "Groovin' Is Easy" – The Electric Flag; 16. "Oye Cómo Va" – Santana; 17. "Ball and Chain" – Janis Joplin; 18. "Ballad of Easy Rider" – The Byrds	Tour of Duty Soundtrack, Volume 2 (1988): 1. "Paint It Black" – Chris Farlowe; 2. "Tin Soldier" – Small Faces; 3. "Stone Free" – The Jimi Hendrix Experience; 4. "Sunshine of Your Love" – Cream; 5. "Born to Be Wild" – Steppenwolf; 6. "Reach Out I'll Be There" – Four Tops; 7. "People Get Ready" – The Impressions; 8. "Jennifer Juniper" – Donovan; 9. "Your Precious Love" – Marvin Gaye & Tammi Terrell; 10. "Groovin'" – The Rascals; 11. "Eight Miles High" – The Byrds; 12. "Cloud Nine" – The Temptations; 13. "I Heard It Through the Grapevine" – Gladys Knight & the Pips; 14. "Piece of My Heart" – Janis Joplin; 15. "It Takes a Lot to Laugh, It Takes a Train to Cry" – Al Kooper & Stephen Stills; 16. "Ring of Fire" – Eric Burdon & The Animals; 17. "Spinning Wheel" – Blood, Sweat & Tears; 18. "Bridge Over Troubled Water" – Aretha Franklin
Tour of Duty Soundtrack, Volume 3 (1989): 1. "White Room" – Cream; 2. "Highway Chile" – Jimi Hendrix; 3. "Lazy Sunday" – Small Faces; 4. "Gloria" – Them; 5. "Sky Pilot" – Eric Burdon and the Animals; 6. "Natural Born Bugie" – Humble Pie; 7. "White Rabbit" – Grace Slick & The Great Society; 8. "The Weight" – The Band; 9. "Go Now" – The Moody Blues; 10. "San Francisco" – Scott McKenzie; 11. "Draft Morning" – The Byrds; 12. "Evil Ways" – Santana; 13. "Dance to the Music" – Sly and the Family Stone; 14. "Tell Her No" – The Zombies; 15. "Barabajagal" – Donovan; 16. "Killing Floor" – The Electric Flag; 17. "Black Night" – Deep Purple; 18. "Paranoid" – Black Sabbath	Tour of Duty Soundtrack, Volume 4 (1989): 1. "This Wheel's on Fire" – Julie Driscoll; 2. "Rag Mama Rag" – The Band; 3. "On the Road Again" – Canned Heat; 4. "Does Anybody Really Know What Time It Is?" – Chicago; 5. "American Woman" – Guess Who; 6. "Race with the Devil" – The Gun; 7. "Down the Dustpipe" – Status Quo; 8. "Living in the Past" – Jethro Tull; 9. "Bird on the Wire" – Leonard Cohen; 10. "Tears of Rage" – Bob Dylan; 11. "Save the Country" – Laura Nyro; 12. "To Love Somebody" – The Bee Gees; 13. "There Won't Be Many Coming Home" – Roy Orbison; 14. "Melting Pot" – Blue Mink; 15. "Hi De Ho" – Blood, Sweat & Tears; 16. "Chestnut Mare" – The Byrds; 17. "Sweet Baby James" – James Taylor; 18. "Listen to the Music" – The Doobie Brothers

==== Charts ====
Date	Title	Chart	Peak position
May 1988	Volume One	Australia (Kent Music Report)	3
August 1988	Volume Two	Australia (ARIA Charts)	5
April 1989	Volume Three	Australia (ARIA Charts)	15
April 1989	Volume Three	Australia (ARIA Charts)	15

- Note: The official Australian chart was the Kent Music Report until June 1988, and which time it changed to ARIA.

=== Compilation soundtrack CDs ===
In 1992, Sony Music released a compilation CD titled The Best of 'Tour of Duty'. It contains only twenty of the songs featured in the four original Tour of Duty Soundtrack albums.

The Best of Tour of Duty (1992)
1. "Born to Be Wild" – Steppenwolf
2. "Tin Soldier" – Small Faces
3. "This Wheel's on Fire" – Julie Driscoll
4. "Barabajagal" – Donovan
5. "Time of the Season" – The Zombies
6. "The Weight" – The Band
7. "Get Together" – The Youngbloods
8. "Chimes of Freedom" – The Byrds
9. "A Whiter Shade of Pale" – Procol Harum
10. "Piece of My Heart" – Janis Joplin
11. "Evil Ways" – Santana
12. "25 or 6 to 4" – Chicago
13. "Killing Floor" – The Electric Flag
14. "Dance to the Music" – Sly & The Family Stone
15. "And When I Die" – Blood, Sweat & Tears
16. "On the Road Again" – Canned Heat
17. "American Woman" – The Guess Who
18. "Race with the Devil" – The Gun
19. "Shapes of Things" – The YardBirds
20. "Sky Pilot" – Eric Burdon & The Animals

Tour of Duty Top 100 (2008)
- Disc 1
1. "I Can Hear Music" – The Beach Boys
2. "White Room" – Cream
3. "Are You Ready" – Pacific Gas & Electric
4. "Eight Miles High" – The Byrds
5. "Hush" – Deep Purple
6. "Have You Ever Seen the Rain?" – CCR
7. "Question" – The Moody Blues
8. "Reflections – Diana Ross & The Supremes
9. "Here Comes the Night" – Them
10. "Son of a Preacher Man" – Dusty Springfield
11. "Lady Willpower" – Gary Puckett & The Union Gap
12. "Black Magic Woman" – Santana
13. "Death of a Clown" – Dave Davies
14. "It's the Same Old Song" – The Four Tops
15. "You Wear It Well" – Rod Stewart
16. "Mannish Boy" – Muddy Waters
17. "I'd Rather Go Blind – Chicken Shack
18. "All Right Now" – Free
19. "Roll Over Beethoven" – The Electric Light Orchestra
20. "Papa's Got a Brand New Bag (Parts 1 & 2)" – James Brown
- Disc 2

== Home media ==
In 2004–2005, Sony Pictures released all three seasons for the first time in the US, both as individual season sets and a complete series set. Due to licensing issues, all original music was replaced with sound-alike versions, much to the dismay of fans. These releases, which have also been criticized for having substandard sound and picture quality, have since been discontinued.

In 2013, Mill Creek Entertainment acquired the US rights to various television series from the Sony Pictures library including Tour of Duty. In 2014–2015, they re-released all three seasons on DVD, again as individual season sets and a complete series set. These releases have the same poor A/V and replacement music of the Sony issues.

Between 2011 and 2013, Fabulous Films released identical DVDs in the UK and Australia, both as individual season sets and a complete series set. They have improved audio and video quality over the US issues, and retain the complete original soundtrack, including "Paint It Black". They also contain extras including cast and crew biographies, hundreds of publicity photos and a feature-length, three-part documentary. The latter includes interviews filmed in Los Angeles in July 2011 with key cast members Terence Knox, Joshua D. Maurer, Steve Akahoshi, Tony Becker, Eric Bruskotter, Kevin Conroy, Miguel A. Núñez Jr. and Dan Gauthier, and key production crew members Zev Braun (producer) Bill L. Norton (writer/director), Steve Smith (writer/producer), Steve Duncan (creator) and Paul Sinor (military advisor).

The complete series was also released on DVD in Germany by Koch Media between 2012 and 2014, both as individual season sets and complete series sets. These releases replicate the poor quality, music-replacement and extras-free US DVDs but they do reinstate the original version of "Paint It Black" in the opening credits.

== Reception ==
=== Television ratings ===
Viewership and ratings per season of Tour of Duty
Season	Episodes	First aired			Last aired			TV season
Season	Episodes	Date	HH rating	Viewers (millions)	Date	HH rating	Viewers (millions)	TV season
1	21	September 24, 1987	10.6	—N/a	April 30, 1988	8.3	—N/a	1987–88
2	16	January 3, 1989	11.3	18.0	May 16, 1989	8.5	12.2	1988–89
3	21	September 23, 1989	10.2	16.4	April 28, 1990	8.1	12.7	1989–90

=== Awards ===
The series won an Emmy Award in 1988 for Outstanding Sound Mixing for a Drama Series (for "Under Siege"), and it was nominated again in 1989 and 1990.

Emmy Award nominations:

- 1989: Outstanding Sound Mixing for a Drama Series (for "I Wish it Could Rain")
- 1990: Outstanding Sound Mixing for a Drama Series (for "And Make Death Proud to Take Us")

Eddie Award nominations

- 1988: Best Edited Episode from a Television Series (for the pilot episode)

== See also ==
- China Beach, a similar series set in South Vietnam during the war
- Combat!, a similar series set in France during World War II that ran for five seasons (152 episodes) from 1962 to 1967
