= Steve Akahoshi =

Japanese-American film and television actor

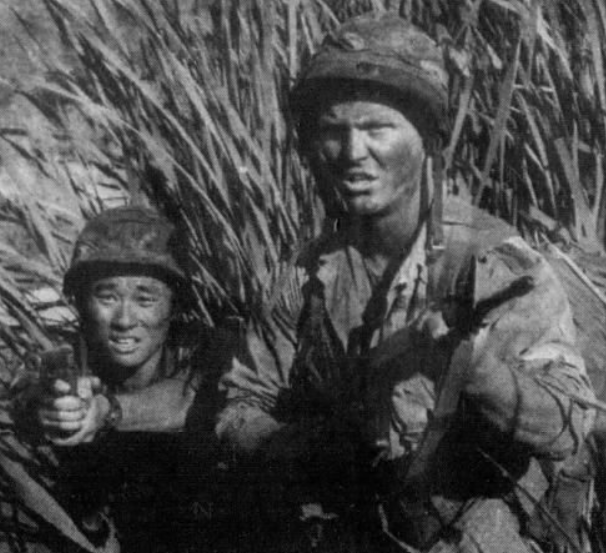
- Akahoshi (left) with Eric Bruskotter in Tour of Duty, 1987
- Born: September 19, 1961 (age 65)
- Occupations: Film and television actor

Steve Akahoshi (born September 19, 1961) is a Japanese-American film and television actor. He is best known for playing private medic Randy Matsuda in the first season of the American military drama television series Tour of Duty.

Akahoshi appeared in films such as The O. J. Simpson Story, The Gift, Back to Back, Fatal Beauty and Teenage Mutant Ninja Turtles III. During his screen career, in 1999, he directed the short film At Face Value, starring Felton Perry.

Akahoshi retired from acting in 2008, last appearing in the film Vicious Circle.
