= Murder Ordained =

- Genre: Crime; Drama
- Written by: Mike Robe; James Sadwith
- Directed by: Mike Robe
- Starring: Keith Carradine; JoBeth Williams; Kathy Bates; John Goodman; Terry Kinney
- Music by: Mark Snow
- Original language: English

Production
- Executive producers: Zev Braun; Ted Field
- Producer: Philip L. Parslow
- Production location: Emporia, Kansas
- Cinematography: Terry K. Meade
- Editors: Michael Eliot; Benjamin A. Weissman
- Running time: 185 minutes
- Production companies: Braun Entertainment Group; CBS Entertainment Production; Interscope Communications

Original release
- Network: CBS
- Release: May 3, 1987

Murder Ordained is a television film that originally aired for CBS in 1987, starring Keith Carradine, JoBeth Williams, and Kathy Bates. It was co-written and directed by Mike Robe. Based on actual events that occurred in Emporia, Kansas, in 1983, the film tells the story of State trooper John Rule (Carradine), who investigates what appears to be a traffic accident resulting in the death of a local minister's wife. His investigation leads him to believe foul play was involved. Much of the principal photography and filming occurred on location in Kansas, and some of the dialogue comes directly from court transcripts.

The film was subsequently released on VHS and DVD. The cast also includes Terry Kinney, M. Emmet Walsh, John Goodman and Johnny Galecki. The series received an Emmy Award nomination for Outstanding Editing for a Miniseries or a Special (Single Camera Production).

== Plot ==
In 1982, Tom Bird, an ambitious and charismatic Lutheran minister in America's mid-west, falls in love with one of his parishioners, Lorna Anderson, and together they make plans to start a fresh life in New Mexico. Within a short space of time both Bird's wife and Anderson's husband are dead. The clever staging of the two murders almost fools the authorities but for the suspicions of a highway patrolman, John Rule, who pursues his own investigation as a matter of conscience. He eventually succeeds despite considerable resistance from Bird's loyal parishioners.
