= Eric Bruskotter =

American actor

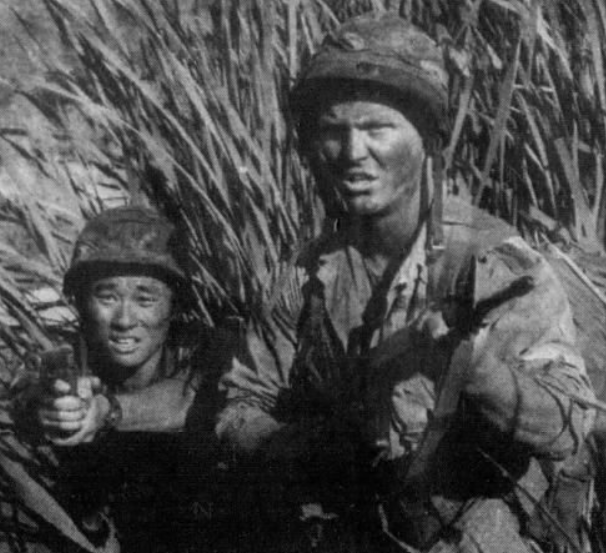
- Bruskotter (right) with Steve Akahoshi in Tour of Duty, 1987
- Born: Fort Wayne, Indiana, U.S.
- Occupation: Actor
- Years active: 1985–present
- Spouse: Tami-Adrian George

Eric Bruskotter is an American actor. He is best known for his role as Cleveland Guardians rookie catcher Rube Baker in Major League II and Major League: Back to the Minors as well as his role as Private Scott Baker in the TV series Tour of Duty.

== Career ==
Bruskotter started acting in the mid-1980s, appearing in television shows like Mr. Belvedere and Amazing Stories. He gained notoriety when he appeared in the film Can't Buy Me Love in 1987. Later that year he appeared as Private Scott Baker in the TV series Tour of Duty, which followed the trials and tribulations of an army platoon, set against the backdrop of the Vietnam War. Bruskotter left the series after its first season, but reprised his role in a guest appearance during the show's third and final season.

He returned to feature films with roles on such films as Crimson Tide and In the Line of Fire. He is perhaps more known for his role as Rube Baker in Major League II and Major League: Back to the Minors.

He appeared in two episodes of Walker Texas Ranger, starring Chuck Norris. In 1997, he had a role in the science fiction film Starship Troopers. During the film shoot he met Tami-Adrian George, who would become his real-life wife.

In the season 2 episodes of Sports Night, "Kyle Whitaker's Got Two Sacks" and "The Reunion". In the former he played Kyle Whitaker, an NFL player on an unnamed Cleveland based team who gets suspended because as a player caught in an illegal steroid abuse ring. In "The Reunion", his character is important to the back story of lead character Dana Whitaker. In 2007, he appeared in two episodes of 24 during Season 6. In 2011, he appeared as a suitor of Shannon Beiste (Dot-Marie Jones) on Glee, football recruiter/talent scout Cooter Menkins.

== Filmography ==
Filmography
Year	Title	Role	Notes
1985	Amazing Stories	Stan	TV series
1986	Mr. Belvedere	Jock #1	
1987	Can't Buy Me Love	Big John	
1987	Tour of Duty	Pvt. Scott Baker / SP4 Scott Baker	TV series (1987–1989)
1988	Rented Lips	Farrell's Goons	
1988	War of the Worlds	Jefferson	TV series
1989	Head of the Class	Buzz	TV series
1989	Not Quite Human II	Rick, Bus Punk	
1990	Nobody's Perfect	Stanley	
1990	Cheers	Cutter Gardner	TV series
1990	Teen Angel Returns	Kevin Donato	TV series
1990	Sweet poison	JJ	TV movie
1991	Quantum Leap	Beau / Red / Glen	TV series (1991–1993)
1992	The Wonder Years	Bully // Football Player	TV series
1993	Dragon: The Bruce Lee Story	Joe Henderson	
1993	In the Line of Fire	Young Agent	
1994	Major League II	Rube Baker	
1994	Beverly Hills, 90210	Belligerent Guy	TV series
1995	Crimson Tide	Bennefield	
1995	Walker, Texas Ranger	Jonah Nelson / Joey O'Bannon	TV series (1995–1997)
1995	JAG	Drum	TV series
1996	The Fan	Catcher	
1997	Starship Troopers	Breckinridge	Movie
1998	Major League: Back to the Minors	Rube Baker	Movie
2006	Bring It On: All or Nothing	Tim Allen	Movie
2008	How I Met Your Mother	George	TV series
2010	Nude Nuns with Big Guns	Tyrone	TV Movie
2011	NCIS	Lester (Truck Driver)	TV series
2011–2012	Glee	Cooter Menkins	TV series
