= Terence Knox =

American actor

- Born: Richland, Washington, U.S.
- Education: Washington State University; Portland State University
- Occupation: Actor
- Years active: 1980–present

Terence Knox is an American film, stage, and television actor. He made his debut in Robert Zemeckis's Used Cars (1980), and appeared in numerous television series, including lead roles in St. Elsewhere (1982–84) and Tour of Duty (1987–90).

== Early life, family and education ==
Knox was born in Richland, Washington. He attended Washington State University, graduating with a degree in English. He subsequently earned his Master of Fine Arts degree at Portland State University's acting program.

== Career ==
Prior to pursuing a career as an actor, Knox worked as a substitute teacher.

Knox is perhaps best known for his roles as Dr. Peter White, the medical resident-turned rapist on St. Elsewhere. He performed during that show's first three seasons (1982–84). Knox followed this with his role as Sergeant 'Zeke' Anderson on Tour of Duty. In 1992, he starred in the horror film Children of the Corn II: The Final Sacrifice, followed by a role in the television film A Mother's Right: The Elizabeth Morgan Story (1992).

He has guest-starred in many shows such as V.I.P., Pacific Blue, V, The Dukes of Hazzard, Murder, She Wrote, The Twilight Zone, Lois & Clark: The New Adventures of Superman, and SeaQuest 2032. He starred in several short-lived TV series, including All Is Forgiven, Rescue 77 and The Road Home.

Knox has appeared onstage in his hometown Richland, Washington, in productions of Ordinary People in 2015 and Frost/Nixon in 2016.

== Filmography ==
=== Film ===
Year	Title	Role	Notes
1980	Used Cars	Roose	
1981	Circle of Power	Male Assistant	
1982	Truckin' Buddy McCoy	Buddy	
1983	Heart Like a Wheel	Jack's Friend	
1983	Lies	Eric Macklin	
1984	City Killer	Leo Kalb	TV movie
1985	Rebel Love	Hightower	
1985	J.O.E. and the Colonel	Michael Rourke	TV movie
1985	Chase	Craig Phalen	TV movie
1987	From a Whisper to a Scream	Burt	
1987	Mighty Pawns	Steve Grenowski	TV movie
1987	Distortions	Paul Elliott	
1987	Murder Ordained	Martin Anderson	TV movie
1990	Tripwire	Jack DeForest	
1990	Angel of Death	Vince Slade	TV movie
1990	Snow Kill	Clayton Thorpe	TV movie
1990	Unspeakable Acts	Dan Casey	TV movie
1991	Lucky Day	Nick Moore	TV movie
1992	Children of the Corn II: The Final Sacrifice	John Garrett	
1992	Overexposed	Nick Kasten	TV movie
1992	A Mother's Right: The Elizabeth Morgan Story	Eric Foretich	TV movie
1992	Forever	Wallace Reid	
1993	Poisoned by Love: the Kern County Murders	Bobby Ballen	TV movie
1994	The Flight of the Dove	Jonathan 'J.B.' Brandels	
1995	919 Fifth Avenue	Detective Sargaent Hodiak	TV movie
1995	Stolen Innocence	Ted Harris	TV movie
1996	University Blues	Martin Cavanaugh	TV movie
1997	Love in Another Town	Mark	TV movie
1999	At Face Value	Construction Foreman	
2001	Space Banda	Fardum Gaspro	
2004	An Ordinary Killer	Detective Ben Bannister	
2005	The Civilization of Maxwell Bright	Officer Riggs	
2006	Obsession	Sam Preston	Short film
2007	Ghost Town	Mayor Emerson Rogers	
2009	The House That Jack Built	Pete	
2010	Deadly Renovations	Frank	
2011	The Hunters	Bernard	
2013	The Man Left Behind	Narrator	Documentary
2014	Gila!	Sheriff Parker	TV movie
2015	Bestseller	Dr. Gardner	
2017	Chasing the Star	Navjote High Priest	
2021	Best Years Gone	Izzy	

=== Television ===
Year	Title	Role	Notes
1980	Knots Landing	Officer Smith	1 episode
1982	The Dukes of Hazzard	Rafe Logan	1 episode
1982–1984	St. Elsewhere	Dr. Peter White	54 episodes
1983	The Renegades	Rufus	1 episode
1985	V	Alan Davis	1 episode
1985	Hotel	Fred Hampton	1 episode
1985	Murder, She Wrote	Steve Pascal	1 episode
1986	All Is Forgiven	Matt Russell	9 episodes
1987–1990	Tour of Duty	Sergeant Zeke Anderson	58 episodes
1989	The Twilight Zone	Thomas Bartin	1 episode
1993	Lois & Clark: The New Adventures of Superman	Jason Trask	2 episodes, Season 1 Ep. 2 "Strange Visitor (From Another Planet)" and Season 1 Ep. 8 "The Green, Green Glow of Home"
1994	The Road Home	Jack Matson	6 episodes
1995	Under One Roof	Matt 'Siggy' Sigalos	4 episodes
1995	SeaQuest 2032	Commander Michael VanCamp	1 episode
1995	The Invaders	Coyle	Miniseries
1996	Murder One	Douglas Fournier	2 episodes
1998	Push	Coach Marsh	1 episode
1999	Rescue 77	Griffith	7 episodes
2001	Walker, Texas Ranger	Garrett Pope	1 episode
2001	V.I.P.	Billy Porter	1 episode
2001	Six Feet Under	Larry Wadd	1 episode
2004	The District	Ron Duffy	1 episode
2005	Wanted	Buddy Inman	1 episode
