= Shakespeare Society of America =

The Shakespeare Society of America is a society and museum of the artifacts, archives, and memorabilia from Hollywood's Globe Theatre related to William Shakespeare.

This collection includes the work, notes books, and photographs of R. Thad Taylor. The artifacts, archives and memorabilia from Hollywood's Globe Theatre and the Shakespeare Society of America were moved to Moss Landing, California in 2007. As of 2011 the president of the society was Terry Taylor, nephew of the founder.
