= Ronald L. Schwary =

American film producer (1944–2020)

- Born: Ronald Louis Schwary; May 23, 1944; United States
- Died: July 2, 2020 (aged 76); United States
- Occupations: Producer, director

Ronald Louis Schwary (May 23, 1944 – July 2, 2020) was an Academy Award winning American producer and director. Films that he was either producer or executive producer include Ordinary People for which he won an Academy Award for Best Picture, Havana, Scent of a Woman, Sabrina, Meet Joe Black and Random Hearts.

He also worked as a producer alongside Sidney Pollack in Absence of Malice and in Tootsie, which was nominated for an Academy Award for Best Picture in 1983. He received another Academy Award for Best Picture nomination for A Soldier's Story in 1985 as well.

Schwary did not receive a Best Picture nomination for Scent of a Woman in 1992, which was both nominated for Oscars and Golden Globes for best picture, since he was the executive producer and the academy only recognized those credited solely as producers.

Schwary was also the producer of the Rolling Stones documentary Lets Spend the Night Together in 1982. Schwary served as an executive producer on the Barbra Streisand directed film The Mirror Has Two Faces. From 2005 to 2011 he produced the Medium TV series.

== Personal life ==
Schwary was born in The Dalles, Oregon, the son of Mitchell Schwary (1903- 1986) who was a real estate broker and Lorraine Ablan. Schwary was of Lebanese descent and both his paternal and maternal grandparents were born in Lebanon. He attended the University of Oregon but transferred to the University of Southern California where he graduated in 1967. At USC, Schwary became friends with actor John Wayne who was a USC alumni who got him a job as a stand-in for Dustin Hoffman in The Graduate. Schwary worked as an assistant director in the 1970s and later as a production manager.

He was married to Emmy-nominated hairstylist Susan Carol Schwary from 1971 to 1994. Both of their sons, Brian and Neil Schwary, work in the film industry. Schwary was married to Karen Feldman from 2009 to 2014.

Schwary died on July 2, 2020, from a rare neurological disease.

== Filmography ==
He was a producer in all films unless otherwise noted.

=== Film ===
Year	Film	Credit	Notes
1976	Shadow of the Hawk	Associate producer	
1978	California Suite	Associate producer	
1979	The Electric Horseman	Associate producer	
1980	Ordinary People		
1981	Absence of Malice	Executive producer	
1982	Tootsie		Uncredited
1984	A Soldier's Story		
1987	Batteries Not Included		
1990	Havana	Executive producer	
1992	Scent of a Woman	Executive producer	
1994	Cops & Robbersons		
1995	Sabrina	Executive producer	
1996	The Mirror Has Two Faces	Co-executive producer	
1998	Meet Joe Black	Executive producer	
1999	Random Hearts	Executive producer	Final film as a producer

Second unit director or assistant director

Year	Film	Role
1973	Save the Tiger	Second assistant director
1974	Dirty Mary, Crazy Larry	Assistant director
1975	Breakout	Assistant director
1975	Breakheart Pass	First assistant director
1976	Shadow of the Hawk	Assistant director
1976	St. Ives	Assistant director
1978	Casey's Shadow	Assistant director

Production manager

Year	Film	Role	Notes
1977	Close Encounters of the Third Kind	Unit production manager: Additional scenes - 1980 special version	Uncredited
1978	The Cheap Detective	Unit production manager	
1978	California Suite	Production manager	
1979	The Electric Horseman	Production manager	
1980	Ordinary People	Unit production manager	
1981	Absence of Malice	Production manager	
1995	Sabrina	Production manager	

As an actor

Year	Film	Role	Notes
1968	Planet of the Apes	Frightened Human	Uncredited
1974	The Ultimate Thrill	Danny	
1978	Casey's Shadow	Ticket Seller	
1978	The Cheap Detective	Cab Driver	
1982	Tootsie	Phil Weintraub	
1987	Batteries Not Included	Louie	
1994	Cops & Robbersons	Producer	
1995	Sabrina	Sheik	

Miscellaneous crew

Year	Film	Role	Notes
1967	The Graduate	Dustin Hoffman's stand-in	Uncredited

=== Television ===
Year	Title	Credit	Notes
1987−88	Tour of Duty		
1991	The Brotherhood	Executive producer	Television film
1999−2000	Now and Again	Executive producer	
2001	Fling	Executive producer	
2002	Jo	Executive producer	Television film
2003	Partners and Crime	Executive producer	Television film
2008	The Meant to Be's	Executive producer	Television film
2005−11	Medium	Executive producer	

Second unit director or assistant director

Year	Title	Role	Notes
1971	Hawaii Five-O	Second assistant director	Uncredited
1973	Kung Fu	Assistant director	
1973	The Blue Knight	Assistant director	Television film
1974	The Stranger Who Looks Like Me	Assistant director	
1975	Barnaby Jones	Assistant director	
1975	Movin' On	Assistant director	
1975	The Entertainer	First assistant director	Television film
1976	Spencer's Pilots	Assistant director	
1977	In the Glitter Palace	Assistant director	Television film
1987−88	Tour of Duty	Second unit director	

As director

Year	Title
1988	Tour of Duty
1996	Sisters
2000	Now and Again
2005−09	Medium

Production manager

Year	Title	Role	Notes
1977	In the Glitter Palace	Unit production manager	Television film
1991	The Brotherhood	Production manager	Television film

Thanks

Year	Title	Role	Notes
2021	93rd Academy Awards	In memoriam	Television special
