= Zev Braun =

American film producer (1928–2019)

- Born: October 19, 1928; Chicago, Illinois, U.S.
- Died: October 17, 2019 (aged 90); Los Angeles, California, U.S.
- Education: University of Chicago
- Occupation: Film producer
- Children: 3, including Ben

Zev Braun (October 19, 1928 – October 17, 2019) was an American motion picture producer. Though much of his work is in television (most notably as the executive producer of the Tour of Duty series) he was a successful filmmaker from the early 1960s onwards.

== Early life ==
Braun was born in Chicago, Illinois. His interest in filmmaking led him fresh from studying Humanities and Classic Arts at the University of Chicago to enter movies while still serving as President of Braun International, his family's packaging firm.

== Career ==
=== 1960s ===
In 1964, his production of Goldstein won the Prix de la Nouvelle Critique at the Cannes Film Festival.

=== 1970s ===
In 1974, his co-production of Maximilian Schell's The Pedestrian won the Golden Globe Award as Best Foreign Film, and was nominated for an Academy Award in the same category. His production of The Little Girl Who Lives Down the Lane, starring Jodie Foster and Martin Sheen, was voted Best Horror Film by the Academy of Science Fiction, Fantasy and Horror Films.

Some of Braun's other productions in the 1970s include: Angela, starring Sophia Loren and John Huston; Freedom Road, starring Muhammad Ali and Kris Kristofferson; and The Fiendish Plot of Dr. Fu Manchu, starring Peter Sellers and Helen Mirren.

=== 1980s ===
In 1984, Braun again teamed up with director Schell to co-produce Marlene, which earned him another Academy Award nomination for Best Documentary Feature along with winning the New York Film Critics Award, The National Society of Film Critics Award and the National Board of Review Award.

The 1987–88 television season saw Braun's company bring to the screen the two-hour television film, Stillwatch, starring Lynda Carter and Angie Dickinson; a four-hour miniseries, Murder Ordained, starring JoBeth Williams, Keith Carradine and Terry Kinney; and a two-hour NBC film, The Father Clements Story, starring Louis Gossett Jr., Malcolm-Jamal Warner and Carroll O'Connor (winner of the Christopher Award and CEBA Award). Tour of Duty, the highly acclaimed weekly prime-time series about the Vietnam War, also premiered in 1987, and ran for three successful seasons on CBS. Other television series from Braun include Murphy's Law, starring George Segal, which ran on ABC and Bagdad Cafe, starring Whoopi Goldberg and Jean Stapleton for CBS.

Another of Braun's productions in the 1980s is Where Are The Children?, starring Jill Clayburgh and Frederick Forrest.

=== 1990s ===
In 1991, Braun executive produced A Seduction in Travis County, a two-hour movie for CBS, starring Lesley Ann Warren, Peter Coyote and Jean Smart. Expanding into the cable marketplace, he executive produced Split Images, a two-hour film based upon the best selling novel by Elmore Leonard and starring Gregory Harrison. In 1994, Braun executive produced the critically praised four-hour mini-series Menendez: A Killing In Beverly Hills for CBS starring Edward James Olmos and Beverly D'Angelo. Also that year at CBS was Dominick Dunne's 919 Fifth Avenue, a two-hour pilot film that starred James Marsden and Denise Richards.

In 1996, Abducted: A Father's Love, a two-hour NBC film starring Chris Noth, Peter MacNicol and Stepfanie Kramer, turned out to be one of the highest rated television films for the year and was highly acclaimed, as well. Lethal Vows, starring John Ritter and Marg Helgenberger, aired on CBS in 1999, and proved to be the network's highest rated prime time program for the first 10 months of the year.

Braun then produced Edges of the Lord, a feature film shot in Poland and starring Haley Joel Osment and Willem Dafoe, distributed by Miramax Films.

=== 2000 ===
Braun executive produced the CBS 2005 May Sweeps entry, Amber Frey: Witness for the Prosecution starring Janel Moloney and Terry Kinney.

Braun won a GLAAD Media Award for Outstanding Movie for Television for the highly rated film he produced for Lifetime Television, A Girl Like Me: The Gwen Araujo Story, directed by Agnieszka Holland starring Mercedes Ruehl.

Most recently, Braun executive produced the Lifetime hit film The Gabby Douglas Story, which starred Regina King and Imani Hakim.

== Personal life ==
Zev Braun was a member of the Academy of Motion Picture Arts and Sciences, as well as the Academy of Television Arts & Sciences. He served on the Board of Trustees for The American Foundation for AIDS Research (amFAR), and the board of directors for The Heart Touch Project. Zev Braun was also a founding member of the board of directors for GIRF (the Gastro-Intestinal Research Foundation) of the University of Chicago hospital and served as the chairman of the board for the International Kidney Institute at UCLA. Braun also served as a member of the board of directors for the Sabin Vaccine Institute. He was awarded the City of Hope's Golden Key for his work in connection with this organization.

He was the father of the former Rice University Men's Basketball head coach Ben Braun. and sons Jerry and Jon, an editor in Los Angeles.

He married his first wife, Joan, and they lived in Glencoe, Illinois.

Braun lived in Los Angeles and was the CEO of Braun Entertainment Group based in Culver City. He died on October 17, 2019, two days before his 91st birthday.
