= Tony Becker =

American actor (born 1963)

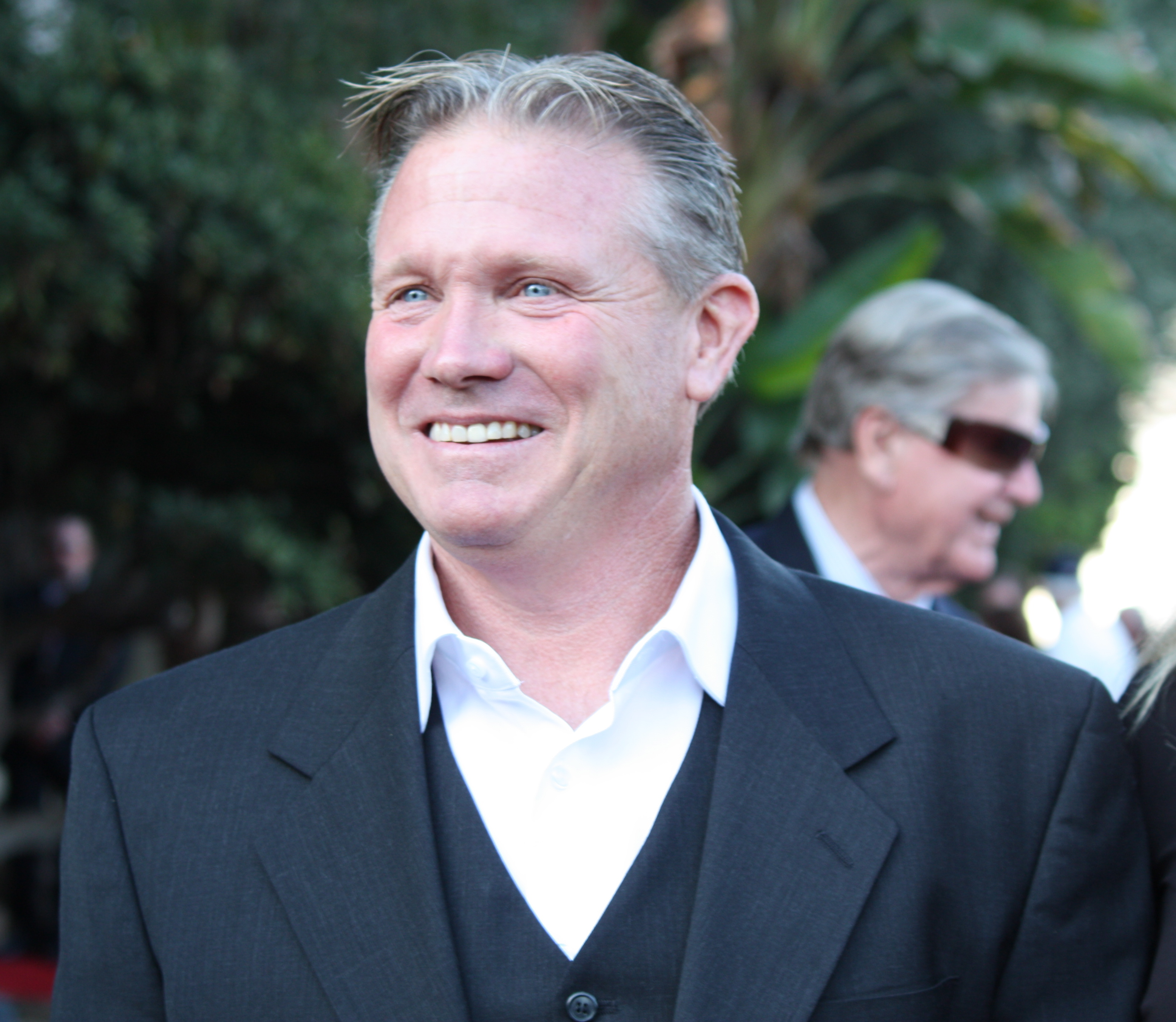
- Becker at The Waltons 40th Anniversary in 2012
- Born: September 14, 1963 (age 63); Los Angeles, California, U.S.
- Occupation: Actor
- Years active: 1973–present

Tony Becker (born September 14, 1963, in Los Angeles, California) is an American actor best known for his role as Private Daniel 'Danny' Purcell on the 1987-1990 CBS Vietnam War series Tour of Duty.

== Career ==
Becker's first television role was on the short-lived ABC network sitcom The Texas Wheelers at age 11, He also co-starred on the series The Oregon Trail and For Love and Honor and had a recurring role as Drew Cutler on The Waltons, a role he later reprised in several reunion movies.

In addition, he also guest starred on numerous television series including Marcus Welby, M.D.; Lou Grant; Little House on the Prairie; MASH; Knots Landing; Matlock; Walker, Texas Ranger and Melrose Place. He also had a small part in the 1986 action thriller film Iron Eagle

Becker also appeared in the award-winning "Cat Herders" commercial shown at the Super Bowl in 2000.

Becker appeared in another commercial for GEICO Insurance Company as an oil field foreman that debuted on February 22, 2019.

== Filmography ==
Year	Title	Roles	Notes	Ref
1965	Slattery's People	Don Schantz	S1 E18 "Question: How Do You Catch a Cool Bird of Paradise?"	
1973	Love Story	Todd	S1 E3 "The Roller Coaster Stops Here"	
1974-1975	The Texas Wheelers	T.J. Wheeler	13 Episodes	
1975	The Other Side of the Mountain	Jerry Kinmont		
1976	Marcus Welby, MD	Brian Brendan	S7 E20	
1976	The Killer Who Wouldn't Die	Steve McDougall		
1976	Bound for Glory	Tough Boy on Train		
1977	The New Mickey Mouse Club	Brett	S1 E12	
1977	The Fitzpatricks	Fechino	S1 E1 & S1 E2	
1977	Cody	Cody		
TBA				
