= Jim Johnston (director) =

American television director (1936–2023)

- Born: James Robert Johnston; September 8, 1936
- Died: November 15, 2023 (aged 87); Venice, California, U.S.
- Occupation: Television director
- Years active: 1986–1999

James Robert Johnston (September 8, 1936 – November 15, 2023) was an American television director. He was best known for his directing work on the television programs Babylon 5 and Tour of Duty.

Johnston died on November 15, 2023 at his home in Venice, California, at the age of 87.

== Filmography ==
=== Television ===
Year	Title	Role	Notes
1985-1988	Miami Vice	Director	4 episodes
1986	Blue de Ville	Director	TV Movie
1987	The Equalizer	Director	1 episode; S3 E5- 'Encounter in a Closed Room'
1987-1990	Tour of Duty	Director, writer	Director- 9 episodes, Writer- 1 episode
1989	Wolf (American TV series)	Director	1 episode; S1 E9- 'Betrayal'
1989	Just the Ten of Us	Director	1 episode; S2 E19- 'Puberty Blues'
1989	Unsub (TV series)	Director	1 episode; S1 E3- 'Clean Slate'
1990	Nasty Boys (TV series)	Director	1 episode; S1 E11- 'Crossover'
1990	Mancuso, F.B.I.	Director	1 episode; S1 E11- 'Shall We Gdansk?'
1991	One on One with John Tesh	Producer	
1990-1991	Shades of LA	Director	4 episodes
1992	Raven (American TV series)	Director	1 episode; S1 E7- 'The Death of Sheila'
1994-1996	Babylon 5	Director	12 episodes
1995-1996	JAG	Director	4 episodes
1996	Viper	Director	1 episode; S2 E8- 'Die Laughing'
1996	Star Command (film)	Director	TV Movie
1996	Hypernauts	Director	1 episode; S1 E2- 'The Star Ranger'
1996-1997	Promised Land	Director	4 episodes
1996-1997	Sliders	Director	4 episodes
1997	Pensacola: Wings of Gold	Director	1 episode; S1 E4- 'It's the Real Thing, Baby'
1997	Touched by an Angel	Director	1 episode; S3 E20- 'Labor of Love'
1998	Mortal Kombat: Conquest	Director	2 episodes
1999	Diagnosis: Murder	Director	1 episode; S6 E14- 'Murder, My Suite'
2022	The Artist and the Astronaut	Executive Producer	
