= Stan Foster =

American actor and film director

Stan Foster is an American film, television, and stage producer, actor, writer and director from Youngstown, Ohio. He is most known for his role in the Tour of Duty TV series where he played Marvin Johnson. He also wrote the play and film Woman Thou Art Loosed and wrote and directed the film Preacher's Kid (2010).
