= Stephen Caffrey (actor) =

American actor

- Born: September 27, 1959 (age 66); Cleveland, Ohio, United States
- Occupations: Film, television, & theatre actor
- Years active: 1984–present
- Spouse: Amanda Wyss (m. 2024)

Stephen Edwin Caffrey (born September 27, 1959, Cleveland, Ohio) is an American television, film and stage actor.

== Early life ==
Stephen Caffrey is the fifth of seven children born to an Irish-American family in Cleveland. At the age of 17, he and his family permanently settled in Grand Rapids, Michigan. Caffrey pursued an acting career after graduation and with a close knit group of acting friends, he founded the Immediate Theatre in Chicago.

== Career ==
=== Film and television ===
Caffrey has appeared on such TV series as The Young Indiana Jones Chronicles; CSI: Miami; Touched by an Angel; Judging Amy; Providence; Profiler; The Practice; Seinfeld; Chicago Hope; Murder, She Wrote; Columbo and Diagnosis Murder. His longest stint, for which he is best known, was as Lt. Myron Goldman on CBS's Vietnam War drama series, Tour of Duty. He also starred as Andrew Preston Cortlandt on ABC's All My Children. He appeared in such films as Longtime Companion (1990), The Babe (1992), Buried Alive II (1997), and Blowback (2000).

=== Theatre ===
Caffrey has performed regularly at the American Conservatory Theater in San Francisco, California. In 1997, he performed in Leslie Ayvazian's Singer's Boy, directed by Carey Perloff.

In 2003, Caffrey replaced Canadian actor Geordie Johnson as Torvald Helmer in a production of A Doll's House due to visa issues as a result of the war on terror. In 2004, he was in a production of The Real Thing. In 2005, he was Anthony Voysey in David Mamet's adaptation of The Voysey Inheritance.

== Personal life ==
Caffrey married actress Amanda Wyss on November 2, 2024.

== Filmography ==
Year	Title	Role	Notes
1984–1985	All My Children	Andrew Preston Cortlandt	13 episodes
1987–1990	Tour of Duty	Lt. Myron Goldman	58 episodes
1989	Longtime Companion	Allen "Fuzzy"	
1990	Columbo	Justin Rowe	Episode: "Columbo Goes to College"
1990–1993	Murder, She Wrote	Alex Seletz/Jonathan Baker	2 episodes
1991	L.A. Law	David Schaeffer	Episode: "The Beverly Hills Hangers"
1992	Diagnosis: Murder	Dr. Jack Parker	TV movie
1992	For Richer, for Poorer	Mark	TV movie
1992	The Babe	Johnny Sylvester (age 30)	
1992	Dinosaurs	Scabby (voice)	Episode: "Leader of the Pack"
1992	The House on Sycamore Street	Dr. Jack Parker	TV movie
1992	The Legend of Prince Valiant	Toby/Messenger Boy (voice)	2 episodes
1993	A Twist of the Knife	Dr. Jack Parker	TV movie
1993	Murder of Innocence	Matthew Wade	TV movie
1994	The Adventures of Young Indiana Jones: Hollywood Follies	John Ford	TV movie
1997	Seinfeld	Arnie	Episode: "The Yada Yada"
2000	Touched by an Angel	Phil Grabowski	Episode: "A House Divided"
2000	Blowback	Agent Norwood	
2005	CSI: Miami	Gary Hall	Episode: "Nailed"
2011	Cinema Verite	Tom	
2015	American Odyssey	David Tennant	4 episodes
2019	NCIS	Kevin Braddish	Episode: "Bears and Cubs"
2021	Bosch	Andrew Patterson	Episode: "Workaround"
