= Ramón Franco (actor) =

Puerto Rican actor (born 1963)

- Born: Ramón Luis Franco; September 12, 1963 (age 62); Caguas, Puerto Rico
- Occupation: Actor
- Years active: 1979–present

Ramón Luis Franco (born September 12, 1963) is a film and television actor. He was born in Caguas, Puerto Rico and resides in Los Angeles.

Franco is most well known for his role in the Vietnam series Tour of Duty, where he played Alberto Ruiz. He also appeared in Clint Eastwood's movie Heartbreak Ridge in 1986 as Lance Corporal Aponte. He appeared in the TV series The Bridge as Mexican cartel leader Fausto Galván. He also appeared in an episode of Miami Vice as Bustos, one of Esteban Revilla's drug cartel members in the season 2 opener "The Prodigal Son".

== Filmography ==
Year	Title	Role	Notes
1979	Boardwalk	Peppy	
1980	The First Deadly Sin	Boy #2 on Bus	
1980	Times Square	Sleez Bag Vendor #1	
1983	Deadly Force	Jesus	
1986	Heartbreak Ridge	Aponte	
1987	Bulletproof	Camilo	
1990	Chains of Gold	James	
1991	Kiss Me a Killer	Ramon	
1993	Street Knight	Cisco	
1993	Extreme Justice	Alberto Torres	uncredited
1995	Hostile Intentions	Officer Alonso	
2007	Resident Evil: Extinction	Runty	
2009	The Perfect Game	Senor Villarreal	
2019	Once Upon a Time in Hollywood	Movie Theater Manager	
2020	Ana	Diego	
