= Joan Barnett =

American casting director and TV executive producer

- Born: November 19, 1945; New York City, New York, U.S.
- Died: October 15, 2020 (aged 74); Boston, Massachusetts, U.S.
- Occupations: Casting director; Executive producer
- Years active: 1974–2005

Joan Barnett (November 19, 1945 – October 15, 2020) was an American casting director and television executive producer. She was best known for producing many television films, notably Adam (1983), which earned her a Primetime Emmy Award nomination.

== Career ==
Barnett began her career as an associate producer and general manager for Alexander H. Cohen in New York, working on television specials, films and Broadway productions. In 1974, she moved to California and opened a casting company with Linda Otto.

Otto/Barnett Associates cast more than 100 television pilots, films, and series. Their efforts also cast an old high school friend named Billy Crystal as one of the leads in the television sitcom Soap (1977–1981).

Barnett followed her casting career by becoming the head of films for NBC, where she put the television films Special Bulletin (1983) and The Burning Bed (1984) in development. She then departed for full-time producing with the Alan Landsburg Productions, where she made Adam (1983) and Unspeakable Acts (1990), both changing the face of docudramas for television, as well as the cult sports film Long Gone (1987) for HBO.

In 1989, Barnett partnered with Jack Grossbart and began a 15-year period of production that included Something to Live for: The Alison Gertz Story (1992), Unforgivable (1996), and Any Mother's Son (1997). All were true stories that had impact in changing laws and raising important information on critical issues.

Barnett retired in 2005 to be near family in Boston. During that time, she was actively involved with Planned Parenthood, where she served on the board.

== Awards and nominations ==
Year	Award	Category	Nominated work	Result	Ref.
1984	Primetime Emmy Awards	Outstanding Drama/Comedy Special (shared with Alan Landsburg and Linda Otto)	Adam	Nominated	
1988	CableACE Awards	Best Movie or Miniseries (shared with Alan Landsburg)	Long Gone	Nominated	
1989	Christopher Awards	Best Television and Cable (shared with Arthur Allan Seidelman and Alan Landsburg)	A Place at the Table	Won	
1993	Wise Owl Awards	Best Television and Theatrical Film Fiction (shared with Jack Grossbart)	Last Wish	Won	
