= Terror in the Night =

1994 film by Colin Bucksey

- Genre: Thriller
- Written by: Denise DeGarmo; Randy Ritchie; Alan Landsburg
- Directed by: Colin Bucksey
- Starring: Joe Penny; Justine Bateman; Matt Mulhern; Valerie Landsburg
- Music by: Dana Kaproff
- Country of origin: United States
- Original language: English

Production
- Executive producer: Alan Landsburg
- Producers: Kay Hoffman; Denise DeGarmo; Randy Ritchie
- Cinematography: David M. Walsh
- Editor: Drake Silliman
- Running time: 93 minutes
- Production companies: The Landsburg Company; Cinematyge; CBS Entertainment Productions

Original release
- Network: CBS
- Release: January 11, 1994

Terror in the Night (working title The Hunter) is a 1994 American made-for-television thriller film starring Joe Penny, Justine Bateman, Matt Mulhern and Valerie Landsburg. Directed by Colin Bucksey and based on actual events, the film was originally broadcast on CBS on January 11, 1994.

== Plot ==
Tom Cross and his girlfriend, Robin Andrews, are enjoying a camping trip in the mountain region of North Carolina. One night, the couple is awakened by a "police officer" who claims that he is taking them to police headquarters. Instead, they are kidnapped and terrorized by Lonnie Carter, a psychotic brutal murderer on-the-loose with his girlfriend Tina and her two children.

== Cast ==
- Joe Penny as Lonnie Carter
- Justine Bateman as Robin Andrews
- Matt Mulhern as Tom Cross
- Valerie Landsburg as Tina
- Al Wiggins as Detective Jack Waters
- John Bennes as Earl Womack
- Barry Bell as Ronnie Barnes

== Production ==
The film was shot at various locations in Charlotte, North Carolina from March 15, 1993, to April 8, 1993.
