= Mysterious Island of Beautiful Women =

- VHS cover
- Genre: Adventure
- Written by: Gary Sherman; Sandor Stern
- Directed by: Joseph Pevney
- Starring: Steven Keats; Jaime Lyn Bauer; Rosalind Chao
- Theme music composer: William Loose; Jack Tillar
- Country of origin: United States
- Original language: English

Production
- Executive producers: Alan Landsburg; Howard Lipstone
- Producer: Paul Freeman
- Production location: Hawaii
- Cinematography: Al Francis
- Editor: Corky Ehlers
- Running time: 96 minutes
- Production company: Alan Landsburg Productions

Original release
- Network: CBS
- Release: December 1, 1979

Mysterious Island of Beautiful Women is a 1979 television film directed by Joseph Pevney.

It originally aired on CBS on December 1, 1979. It was produced by Alan Landsburg Productions.

== Plot ==
After the fall of Indochina to the communists in 1954, a mixed-race group of orphan girls and a Catholic nun escape on a plane, but the flight soon runs into a storm. In 1979, six men from an oil company are trying to reach Guam in a sea plane, so that one of them, who has been blinded by an injury, can have his sight restored at a hospital. They go off course after their radio and navigation equipment are damaged in an electrical storm, land on the shore of a remote island. They soon encounter a group of women in their late 20s who are fearful of men, and often clash with a nearby tribe of "head-choppers." The women have limited vocabularies, mostly childish names, and recite prayers in the presence of a distorted cross formed by a 3-bladed propeller on a post. They take orders from Lizbeth, a ruthless leader who consults with an unseen "sister" on all important questions. The men are told that in the past, two of the women were impregnated by natives, but the male child was killed while a girl was kept alive.

The visiting men befriend some of the women, but several are captured on Lizbeth's orders and threatened with death. One of the men finds the plane that the girls crashed in 25 years earlier; the pilots were killed and the nun severely injured. Confined to the plane and unable to speak, the nun recorded in her diary how the oldest girl Lizabeth became the mother figure to the other girls, also caring for the nun until her death five years later. When this is revealed to the rest of the women, Lizbeth's authority is undermined, and she is killed by the woman whose male baby she earlier killed. The men salvage a working "direction finder" from the other plane to escape the island in their plane with the other women.

== Cast ==
- Steven Keats as Mike Stapleton
- Jaime Lyn Bauer as Lizabeth
- Rosalind Chao as Flower
- Jayne Kennedy as Chocolate
- Kathryn Davis as Snow
- Sandy McPeak as Stu
- Clint Walker as Wendell
- Peter Lawford as Gordon Duvall

== See also ==
- Lord of the Flies
- Amazons
