= Valerie Landsburg =

American singer-songwriter (b. 1958)

- Born: August 12, 1958 (age 68); New York City
- Other name: Valerie Landsberg
- Occupations: Actress, director, screenwriter, singer-songwriter
- Years active: 1976–present
- Known for: Doris Schwartz in Fame
- Spouse: James McVay (m. 1984–2018)
- Father: Alan Landsburg

Valerie Landsburg (born August 12, 1958) is an American actress, television and film director, screenwriter, and singer-songwriter. She is best known for her portrayal of Doris Schwartz in the 1982 series Fame, interpreting, for television, the role that Maureen Teefy had originated in the film. She was also the lead singer on the UK top five hit "Hi Fidelity". Producer Alan Landsburg was her father, and she appeared in at least one installment of True Confessions, an anthology series program he produced.

== Biography ==
Born in New York City to Sally Landsburg, a psychologist and author, and Alan Landsburg. She graduated from Beverly Hills High School in 1976. Landsburg made her acting debut in the 1978 movie Thank God It's Friday. In 1980, she took over the role of Libby in Neil Simon's I Ought to Be in Pictures. In 1982, she appeared in the television series Fame. During the series run, Landsburg wrote and directed one episode of the series. Shortly after Landsburg left the show in 1985, she co-starred in two different comedy TV series, which practically ran at the same time. The first, You Again?, starred Jack Klugman, and lasted for one season. From the creators of Cheers, next came the Bess Armstrong series All Is Forgiven, which NBC cancelled after nine episodes. Despite its limited engagement, the series was rebroadcast on the A&E network through 1989, where it gained a broader audience.

Outside of recurring roles in Hotel and Dream On, she appeared in about a dozen TV movies and guest appearances on TV series, including Murder, She Wrote, Beverly Hills, 90210, Empty Nest, Nip/Tuck and The Unit. In between TV and film projects, she has appeared in stage plays. In addition to acting, Landsburg has directed several feature films and episodic television shows.

In 2001, she released an album of mostly her own compositions, titled Grownup. Among the tracks was a re-recording of "Hi Fidelity".

She is a life member of the Asian Academy of Film & Television.

Landsburg has been candid about her struggle with alcoholism. She began drinking as a teenager and her problem worsened while she was appearing on Fame although she managed to keep her habits from affecting her work. She got sober the year she left the series and has been sober ever since.

== Filmography ==
Film
Year	Film	Role	Notes
1978	Thank God It's Friday	Frannie	
1990	Welcome Home, Roxy Carmichael	Miss Day Ashburn	Credited as Valerie Landsberg
1997	Drawn to the Flame	-	Director
1997	Borrowed Life Stolen Love	-	Director
1997	Too Good to Be True	-	Producer
2001	Rock Star	Concert After-Party Guest	Uncredited
2005	Bound by Lies	-	Director
Television
Year	Title	Role	Notes
1976	The Kids From C.A.P.E.R.	Dunga Ginny	1 episode
1979	The Triangle Factory Fire Scandal	Loretta	Television movie
1980	Marathon	Annie	Television movie
1982–1987	Fame	Doris Rene Schwartz	84 episodes
1986	You Again?	Pam	8 episodes
1986	All is Forgiven	Lorraine Elder	9 episodes
1987	1st & Ten	Anna	5 episodes
1987–1988	Hotel	Cheryl Dolan	17 episodes
1988	Murder, She Wrote	Alice Brooke	1 episode
1989	The Ryan White Story	Loretta	Television movie
1990	Unspeakable Acts	Maggie Rivera	Television movie
1990	Babies	Andrea	Television movie
1990	Beverly Hills, 90210	Cathy Gerson	1 episode
1993	Not in My Family		Television movie
1993–1994	Dream On	Gina Pedalbee	3 episodes
1994	Terror in the Night	Tina	Television movie
1994	One of Her Own	Stacy Schoep	Television movie
1995	Empty Nest	Valerie	1 episode Director
1997	Women: Stories of Passion	-	4 episodes Director
2000	Bar Hopping	Agent No. 4	Television movie
2002	The Best Sex Ever	-	7 episodes Director
2003	Columbo: Columbo Likes the Nightlife		Television movie
2005	American Dreams		1 episode
2005	Nip/Tuck	Marian Berg	1 episode
2006	The Unit	Marge	1 episode
2006	Windfall		1 episode
2009	Mrs. Washington Goes to Smith	Noreen	Television movie
