= The Jayne Mansfield Story =

1980 American Television Film

- Official DVD cover
- Genre: Biography; Drama
- Written by: Charles Dennis; Nancy Gayle
- Directed by: Dick Lowry
- Starring: Loni Anderson; Arnold Schwarzenegger
- Theme music composer: Jimmie Haskell
- Country of origin: United States
- Original language: English

Production
- Executive producer: Tom Kuhn
- Producers: Joan Barnett; Alan Landsburg; Linda Otto
- Cinematography: Paul Lohmann
- Editor: Corky Ehlers
- Running time: 100 Minutes
- Production company: Alan Landsburg Productions

Original release
- Network: CBS
- Release: October 29, 1980

The Jayne Mansfield Story is a 1980 American made-for-television biographical drama film directed by Dick Lowry starring Loni Anderson as the actress, and Arnold Schwarzenegger as her bodybuilder husband, based on the life of Jayne Mansfield. The film was originally titled Jayne Mansfield: A Symbol of the '50s. The script is based on the book Jayne Mansfield and the American Fifties by Martha Saxton.

It originally aired on CBS on October 29, 1980.

The film is listed in Golden Raspberry Award founder John Wilson's book The Official Razzie Movie Guide as one of The 100 Most Enjoyably Bad Movies Ever Made.

== Plot ==
The film tells the fictionalized rise and fall of Hollywood bombshell and sex symbol Jayne Mansfield.

The Jayne Mansfield Story opens in 1967 in Mississippi with Jayne Mansfield closing a show and then talking on a payphone with Mickey Hargitay about going on a new tour together. Intercut with scenes of Mansfield getting into a car which then crashes when the driver tries to overtake a spray truck is film of a teleprinter typing out the news of Mansfield's death. An announcer reads the text over both scenes. The film then goes to credits, intercut with still images of Mansfield as a child and young woman.

The next scene is of an unnamed woman interviewing Hargitay about Mansfield (Hargitay's graying hair indicates that this is some time after her death). Hargitay shows her photos including one where a dark-haired Mansfield poses with a chimpanzee as a publicity stunt to promote a film premiere at the theater where she worked as a popcorn salesperson. (Hargitay narrates throughout the rest of the film). In a scene from the theater and at home Mansfield expresses her desire to act in films and she is shown as a single mother, taking care of her only daughter Jayne Marie after the father left because he disagreed with her acting ambition.

In the next scene Mansfield approaches talent agent Bob Garrett on the street (whom she met, off-screen, at the premiere). She manages to convince Garrett to give her an audition for a one line part in a film after pushing her chest out and declaring that she has something more than Marilyn Monroe. At the audition, Mansfield declines to read the line given to her, opting instead to read a line from Come Back, Little Sheba. She doesn't get the part.

Meeting later with Garrett, Mansfield makes a high pitched cooing sound and strikes a pose, asking rhetorically if this is what they want. Garrett tells her she might be on to something and tells her to lose weight and change her hair. Mansfield states that she will project an airheaded bimbo image until her career gets going and then she will switch to more serious roles. A month later Mansfield meets with Garrett at a car dealership, with blonde hair and wearing a pink polka-dot dress, she is received a pink Cadillac for free as promotion.

Next, Mansfield appears at the Southern California press club (courtesy of Garrett to raise her profile), handing out Christmas presents while wearing a white fur trimmed bikini top and bottom. At a Florida poolside photoshoot, Mansfield pretends to fall in the pool (losing her bikini top in the process), shouting that she can't swim to get the attention of the photographers who eagerly take pictures of her.

== Cast ==
- Loni Anderson as Jayne Mansfield
- Arnold Schwarzenegger as Mickey Hargitay
- Ray Buktenica as Bob Garrett
- Kathleen Lloyd as Carol Sue Peters
- G. D. Spradlin as Gerald Conway
- Whitney Rydbeck as Photographer
- Laura Jacoby as Jayne Marie Mansfield
- Deirdre Hoffman (Loni Anderson's actual daughter) as 16-year-old Jayne Marie

== Reception ==
=== Accolades ===
Nominated for Primetime Emmy for

- Outstanding Costume Design for a Special - Warden Neil (costume designer)
- Outstanding Achievement in Makeup - Alan Friedman (makeup) Lona Jeffers (makeup)
- Outstanding Achievement in Hair styling - Silvia Abascal (hairstylist) Janis Clark (hairstylist)
