= A Mother's Right: The Elizabeth Morgan Story =

- Genre: Drama
- Written by: Alan Landsburg; Lucretia Baxter
- Directed by: Linda Otto
- Starring: Bonnie Bedelia
- Theme music composer: James McVay
- Country of origin: United States
- Original language: English

Production
- Executive producers: Alan Landsburg; Howard Lipstone; Linda Otto
- Producers: Kay Hoffman; Don Goldman
- Cinematography: Mike Fash
- Editor: Robin Wilson
- Running time: 95 minutes
- Production company: Landsburg Company

Original release
- Network: ABC
- Release: November 29, 1992

A Mother's Right: The Elizabeth Morgan Story is a 1992 television film directed by Linda Otto. Starring Bonnie Bedelia in the title role, the courtroom drama—which has also been released as Shattered Silence—chronicles the story behind the Elizabeth Morgan case, in which a woman suspected her ex-husband was sexually abusing their three year old daughter. After Morgan's ex-husband was cleared of suspicion by police, and a judge ordered unsupervised visitation rights be returned to him, Morgan refused to reveal the location of the child. Morgan was subsequently held in contempt of court and imprisoned for more than two years, until an act of Congress was written and passed specifically to free her.

== Cast ==
- Bonnie Bedelia as Dr. Jean Elizabeth Morgan
- Terence Knox as Eric Foretich
- Kenneth Welsh as Paul Michel
- Nick Searcy as Rob Morgan
- Pam Grier as Linda Holman
- Caroline Dollar as Hilary A. Foretich
- Patricia Neal as Antonia Morgan
- Rip Torn as Bill Morgan

== Production ==
The film went into production under the title With Reason to Suspect on February 24, 1992, in Charlotte, North Carolina. Including preparation, director Linda Otto spent three years making the film.

== Reception ==
Variety magazine wrote that A Mother's Right is "a quality telefilm that should draw good ratings thanks to a powerful performance by Bonnie Bedelia. [..] The telefilm provides an emotional rollercoaster ride for viewers, who will not want to get off until the last judge's gavel is pounded. Technically the project is first rate. Writing is tight and moves the project along smoothly. Drama draws on the heart strings without becoming overly sweet. Linda Otto's direction is fluid and the acting brings this project home."
