= Alaska Wilderness Lake =

1971 film

- Produced by: Alan Landsburg
- Production company: Alan Landsburg Productions
- Release date: 1971
- Country: United States
- Language: English

Alaska Wilderness Lake is a 1971 American documentary film produced by Alan Landsburg. It was nominated for an Academy Award for Best Documentary Feature. It was based on the book Red Salmon, Brown Bear by Theodore J. Walker.
