= Steve Baker (illusionist) =

American illusionist (1938–2017)

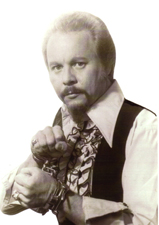
Steve Baker promotional photo, c. 1975

Stevan "Mr. Escape" Baker (July 26, 1938 – September 17, 2017) was an American illusionist, comedian, and magician best known as an escape artist. During his career from 1967 through the early 1990s Baker appeared on Dick Clark's LIVE Wednesday, Games People Play, and was a star on an HBO special along with Tony Curtis and special guest star Dorothy Dietrich, called The World's Greatest Escapes, and several times on That's Incredible!.

== Early history ==
Baker's career as "Mr. Escape" began on February 22, 1967, when he presented an upside down hanging strait-jacket escape from the Tribune Tower Building in Oakland, California, United States. Thousands of people attended the escape along with actress Dawn Wells, and a sheriff who was a direct descendant of Wyatt Earp. The escape was documented by the British Pathe Newsreel Organization. Steve Baker was a favorite on TV personality, Dick Clark. He performed numerous times on Dick Clark Live Wednesdays on NBC, then a few years later on another show called LIVE with Dick Clark on CBS.

== Personal history ==
Baker was born on July 26, 1938, in East St. Louis, Illinois. His parents were Joseph and Cleo (Spacklin) Baker. As a child, Baker had rheumatic fever, which restricted him to his room while his friends all played outside. The Baker family moved to California when he was eight years old to see a doctor specializing in rheumatic fever. In the years that Baker was confined in his room, he started reading "The Art of Escape" about Harry Houdini and it inspired him. After three years, he recovered from the rheumatic fever and Baker challenged his friends to chain him up so he could practice what he learned from Houdini's books.

Baker enlisted in the U.S Air Force during the Cold War, but that did not stop him from practicing his escapes. He would perform periodically while not on duty to make extra money. When his time in the service ended, Baker went to Vietnam to perform for the troops. Over time, his courage and determination grew tremendously. This is where Baker knew he wanted to one-up Houdini. If Houdini was on the eighth floor, Baker would go to the ninth. After every escape, Baker's confidence grew.

Baker was portrayed by Howard Allen in one episode of the TV series "China Beach" (Season 4, Episode 4, "Escape," 27 Oct 1990). The following phrase appears at the 43:31 minute mark as the credits end: "Steve Baker Survived Vietnam and Continues to Perform as 'Mr. Escape.'"

Baker was able to travel the world doing what he loved. In 1971, at a show in Boise, Steve pulled an audience member on stage to assist in one of his tricks. This audience member was Julia Veltri, who then became his wife and stage assistant for the next 41 years. Together, Steve and Julia traveled to various countries performing magic tricks and escapes.

== Death ==
In 2006, Steve and Julia moved to Irving, Illinois, to care for Steve's mother who was sick with cancer. Shortly after his mother died, Steve was diagnosed with prostate cancer and had a year's worth of treatment. Steve never got back into his career following his prostate cancer. On September 17, 2017, at the age of 79, Steve Baker died in his home.
