= Whitney Rydbeck =

American actor (1945–2024)

- Born: Whitney Wilbert Rydbeck; March 13, 1945; Los Angeles, California, U.S.
- Died: July 15, 2024 (aged 79); Chatsworth, California, U.S.
- Occupation: Actor
- Years active: 1970–2007

Whitney Wilbert Rydbeck (March 13, 1945 – July 15, 2024) was an American actor. Rydbeck had a prolific career as a TV and film actor, appearing in over fifty television and motion picture titles. He appeared on the shows Scrubs, 7th Heaven, Walt Disney's Wonderful World of Color, Buck Rogers in the 25th Century, Star Trek: The Next Generation, and Far Out Space Nuts.

Rydbeck played Whitney in the children's program Whitney and the Robot.

Rydbeck also appeared on the silver screen in Grand Jury, Battle Beyond the Stars, A Very Brady Sequel, Oliver & Company, and Friday the 13th Part VI: Jason Lives.

Rydbeck died of complications from prostate cancer in Chatsworth, California, on July 15, 2024, at the age of 79.

== Partial filmography ==
- Sleeper (1973) – Janus (uncredited)
- Grand Jury (1976) – DMV Clerk
- Love at First Bite (1979) – Male Commissare
- Rocky II (1979) – Sound Man
- 1941 (1979) – Daffy
- The Baltimore Bullet (1980) – Photographer
- The Jayne Mansfield Story (1980) – Photographer
- Battle Beyond the Stars (1980) – Saunders: Dr. Hephaestus' Staff
- The Cherokee Trail (1981) - Bob Cochraine
- Friday the 13th Part VI: Jason Lives (1986) – Roy
- Oliver & Company (1988) – (voice)
- A Very Brady Sequel (1996) – Auctioneer
- Striking Resemblance (1997) – Dr. Baxter
- Folle d'elle (1998) – Fauvette
- Angels with Angles (2005) – Jack Benny
- Crystal Lake Memories: The Complete History of Friday the 13th (2013) - Himself (documentary film)
