= Caroline Dollar =

American actress

- Born: December 28, 1983 (age 42); Greensboro, North Carolina, United States
- Occupation: Actress
- Years active: 1991–2007

Caroline Dollar (born December 28, 1983) is an American actress.

== Life and career ==
Dollar was born in Greensboro, North Carolina. She attended Needham B. Broughton High School in Raleigh, North Carolina. Like her older sister, actress Aubrey Dollar, she appeared as a child actress in a small number of television miniseries, such as Day-O and Stephen King's Golden Years, while a child, but did not take any roles as an adult until a brief appearance in a 2005 episode of One Tree Hill, "A Multitude of Casualties". She also appeared in the film Remember the Daze (2007), her last screen acting role to date.

== Awards and nominations ==
In 1993 she was nominated for a Young Artist Award at the Young Artist Awards for Best Young Actress Under Ten in a Television Movie for A Mother's Right: The Elizabeth Morgan Story (1992).

== Filmography ==
- 1991 Golden Years (2 episodes) as Little Girl
- 1991 In a Child's Name (TV Mini-Series) as Astrid
- 1992 Day-O (TV Movie) as Cory Connors
- 1992 A Mother's Right: The Elizabeth Morgan Story (TV Movie) as Hilary
- 1995 Death in Small Doses (TV Movie) as Allison
- 2005 One Tree Hill (1 episode, "A Multitude of Casualties") as Energetic Girl
- 2007 Remember the Daze as Kiki
