= JoBeth Williams =

American actress (born 1948)

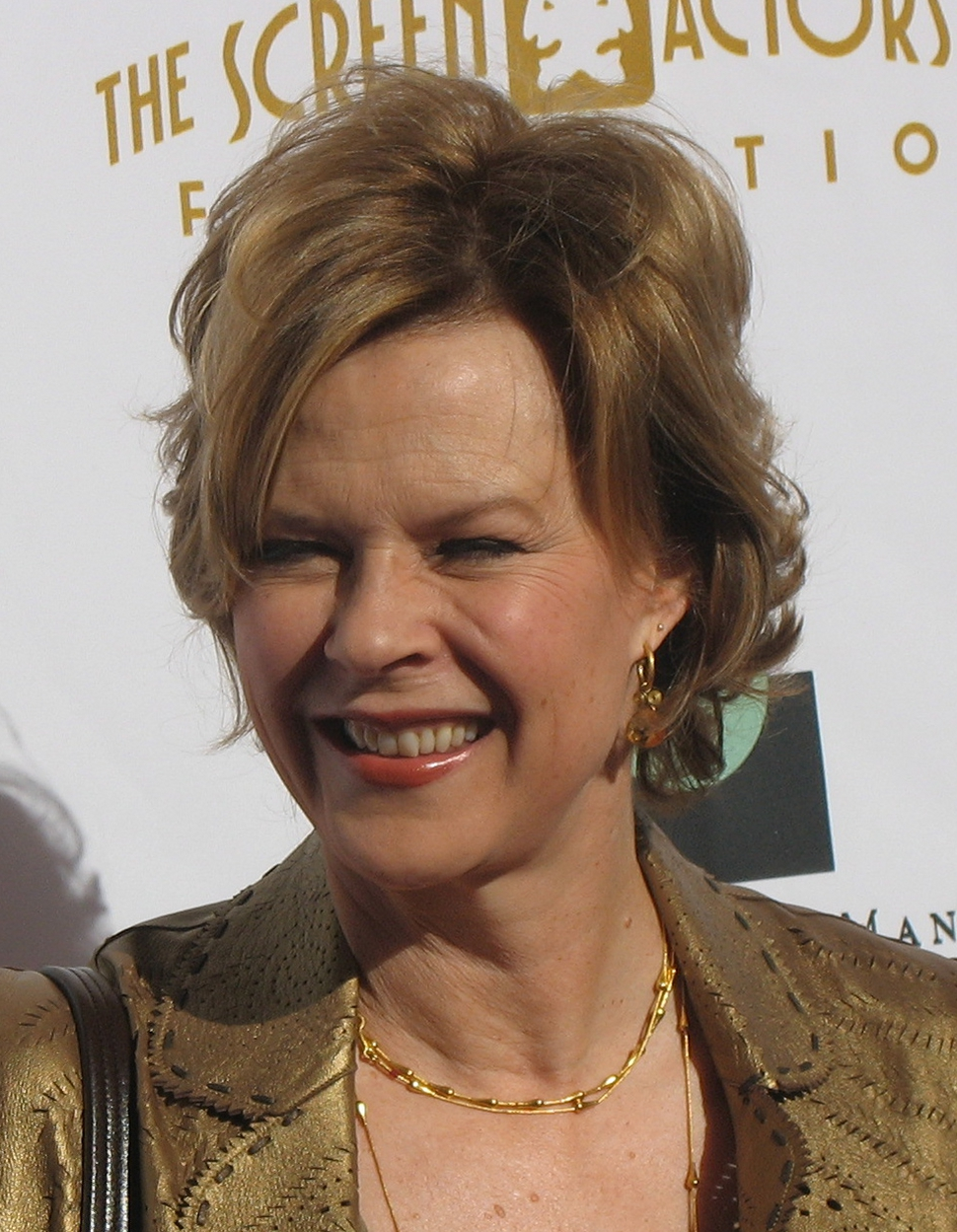
- Williams at the SAG Foundation brunch in January 2007
- Born: Margaret JoBeth Williams; December 6, 1948 (age 77); Houston, Texas, U.S.
- Education: Pembroke College in Brown University
- Occupation: Actress
- Years active: 1974–present
- Spouse: John Pasquin (m. 1982)
- Children: 2

Margaret JoBeth Williams (born December 6, 1948) is an American actress. She rose to prominence appearing in such films as Kramer vs. Kramer (1979), Stir Crazy (1980), Poltergeist (1982), The Big Chill (1983), The Day After (1983), Teachers (1984), and Poltergeist II: The Other Side (1986). A three-time Emmy Award nominee, she was nominated for Outstanding Lead Actress in a Miniseries or a Movie for her work in the TV movie Adam (1983) and the TV miniseries Baby M (1988). Her third nomination was for her guest role in the sitcom Frasier (1994). She also starred in the TV series The Client (1995–96) and had recurring roles in the TV series Dexter (2007) and Private Practice (2009–11).

Her directorial debut with the 1994 short film On Hope earned her an Academy Award nomination for Best Live Action Short Film. In 2009, she began serving as president of the Screen Actors Guild Foundation; she is president emerita of the foundation.

== Early life ==
Williams was born in Houston, Texas, to Frances Faye (née Adams), a dietitian, and Fredric Roger Williams, an opera singer and manager of a wire and cable company. Williams grew up in the South Park neighborhood of Houston, and attended Jones High School, from which she graduated in 1966.

== Career ==
=== Early career ===
Williams's first television role was on the Boston-produced, first-run, syndicated, children's television series Jabberwocky, which debuted in 1972. Her character was named JoBeth. She joined the Jabberwocky cast in season two, replacing the original hostess, Joanne Sopko. The series ran until 1978. She was a regular on two soap operas, playing Carrie Wheeler on Somerset and Brandy Shelloe on Guiding Light. Williams's feature-film debut came in 1979's Kramer vs. Kramer as a girlfriend of Dustin Hoffman's character, memorably quizzed by his son after being discovered walking nude to the bathroom.

=== Motion pictures ===
Williams is perhaps most recognized for her roles in Stir Crazy (1980), with Gene Wilder and Richard Pryor, The Dogs of War (1980) with Christopher Walken and Tom Berenger, and Poltergeist (1982), as suburban housewife Diane Freeling, a character she reprised in a sequel, Poltergeist II: The Other Side, 1986). A year later, she was part of the ensemble comedy-drama The Big Chill (1983). Her starring role in the film American Dreamer (1984), opposite Tom Conti, earned her the 1985 Best Actress Award from the Kansas City Film Critics Circle. High-profile co-starring roles in Teachers (1984) with Nick Nolte, Desert Bloom (1986) with Jon Voight, Memories of Me with Billy Crystal (1988), and Blake Edwards's Switch (1991) with Ellen Barkin followed.

She is also known for starring opposite Kris Kristofferson in Oscar-winning director Franklin J. Schaffner's final film, the Vietnam POW drama Welcome Home (1989). In 1992, she reteamed with The Big Chill director Lawrence Kasdan to portray Bessie Earp in Wyatt Earp with Kevin Costner, and starred as Crazy Diane/Sane Diane, a schizophrenic shut-in, in the dark independent comedy, Me Myself & I.

She also co-starred with Ed O'Neill in the John Hughes-written comedy Dutch (1991) and starred in Stop! Or My Mom Will Shoot (1992) as the police detective/love interest of Sylvester Stallone's character. In 1995, she was nominated for an Academy Award for her 1994 live-action short On Hope, starring Annette O'Toole; the film was Williams's directorial debut. In 1997, she played a domineering lesbian in the independent comedy Little City with Jon Bon Jovi, and an hysterical publishing editor in Just Write with Jeremy Piven. In 2005, she appeared in the Drew Barrymore-Jimmy Fallon baseball comedy Fever Pitch.

In 2011, she appeared with Steve Martin, Owen Wilson, Rashida Jones, and Jack Black in the bird-watching comedy The Big Year for 20th Century Fox.

=== Television work ===
Williams has also gained critical acclaim for a number of performances in notable television movies, including the nuclear holocaust film The Day After (1983), Murder Ordained (1987), as Lois Burnham Wilson in My Name is Bill W. (1989), and the critically acclaimed Masterpiece Theatre presentation of The Ponder Heart (2003) for director Martha Coolidge.

She earned Emmy nominations for starring as real-life characters Revé Walsh (the wife of John Walsh) in the film Adam (1983) and Mary Beth Whitehead in Baby M (1988). In 1993, she anchored the improvised Showtime dramedy Chantilly Lace with Helen Slater and Martha Plimpton.

She also had an Emmy-nominated guest-starring role on Frasier and played Reggie Love in the 1995–1996 CBS series The Client (adapted from the 1994 film of the same title), which lasted only 21 episodes, but gained a wider audience when it was rebroadcast in reruns on the TNT Network.

Williams appeared on a 2006 episode of 24 as Christopher Henderson (Peter Weller)'s wife, Miriam, who literally takes a (nonfatal) bullet for her husband.

She appeared in one episode of the 1998 TV miniseries From the Earth to the Moon as Marge Slayton, the wife of Deke Slayton. The episode is part 11 of the series and titled "The Original Wives Club".

In 1999, Williams teamed with John Larroquette and Julie Benz for the CBS network situation comedy Payne. The show, which was the American television version of the hit British comedy Fawlty Towers, lasted just 10 episodes.

In 2007, she joined Dexter for a four-episode arc as the serial killer's future mother-in-law, whose daughter was also played by Benz. Also, she appeared in a memorable 2009 Criminal Minds listed as a special guest star in the episode "Empty Planet" as Professor Ursula Kent, who helps the BAU with a bomb threat in Seattle.

She has played the recurring role of Bizzy Forbes-Montgomery, mother of Kate Walsh's Addison, on ABC's Private Practice since 2009.

In 2014, she appeared in the CBS science-fiction drama Extant, as Leigh Kern (season one, episode seven).

== Personal life ==
She married TV and film director John Pasquin on March 13, 1982. They have two sons, Will and Nick; and she has a stepdaughter, Sarah.

== Filmography ==
=== Film ===
Year	Title	Role
1979	Kramer vs. Kramer	Phyllis Bernard
1980	Stir Crazy	Meredith
1980	The Dogs of War	Jessie Shannon
1982	Poltergeist	Diane Freeling
1982	Endangered Species	Harriet Purdue
1983	The Big Chill	Karen Bowens
1984	Teachers	Lisa Hammond
1984	American Dreamer	Cathy Palmer / Rebecca Ryan
1986	Desert Bloom	Lily Chismore
1986	Poltergeist II: The Other Side	Diane Freeling
1988	Memories of Me	Lisa
1989	Welcome Home	Sarah
1991	Switch	Margo Brofman
1991	Dutch	Natalie Standish
1992	Stop! Or My Mom Will Shoot	Lt. Gwen Harper
1992	Me Myself & I	Diane
1994	Wyatt Earp	Bessie Earp
1997	Jungle 2 Jungle	Dr. Patricia Cromwell
1997	Just Write	Sidney Stone
1997	Little City	Anne
1997	When Danger Follows You Home	Anne Werden
2002	The Rose Technique	Dr. Lillian Rose
2002	Searching for Debra Winger	Herself
2005	Fever Pitch	Maureen Meeks
2005	Crazylove	Mrs. Mayer
2007	In the Land of Women	Agnes Webb
2009	Timer	Marion Depaul
2011	The Big Year	Edith Preissler
2016	Within	Rosemary Fletcher
2017	Barracuda	Patricia
2017	What the Night Can Do	Bettye Sue Dryer
2018	Alex & the List	Mrs. Stern
2019	Sgt. Will Gardner	Sherry
2023	Chantilly Bridge	Williams
2025	Not Without Hope	Marcia
2026	Behemoth!	TBA

=== Television ===
Year	Title	Role	Notes
1974	Great Performances	Constance Wilde	Episode: "Feasting with Panthers"
1974	Jabberwocky	JoBeth	
1976	Somerset	Carrie Wheeler	2 episodes
1977–1981	Guiding Light	Brandy Schlooe	Recurring role
1978	The World Beyond	Marian Faber	Television film
1980	Fun and Games	Laura Weston	Television film
1980	The White Shadow	Paula Harris	Episode: "Reunion"
1981	The Big Black Pill	Tiffany Farrenpour	Television film
1983	Adam	Reve Walsh	Television film
1983	The Day After	Nancy Bauer	Television film
1985	Kids Don't Tell	Claudia Ryan	Television film
1986	Adam: His Song Continues	Reve Walsh	Television film
1987	Murder Ordained	Lorna Anderson	Television film
1989	My Name Is Bill W.	Lois 'Lo' Wilson	Television film
1990	Child in the Night	Dr. Hollis	Television film
1990	Timeless Tales from Hallmark	Bettina	Episode: "The Elves and the Shoemaker"
1991	Victim of Love	Tess Palmer	Television film
1991	The Legend of Prince Valiant	Queen Ilene	Voice, episode: "The Secret of Perilous Garde"
1992	Fish Police	Angel Jones	Voice, main role
1992	Jonathan: The Boy Nobody Wanted	Ginny Moore	Television film
1993	Jonny's Golden Quest	Jade Kenyon	Voice, television film
1993	Sex, Love and Cold Hard Cash	Sarah Gallagher	Television film
1993	Chantilly Lace	Natalie	Television film
1993	Final Appeal	Christine Biondi	Television film
1993	Gloria Vane	Gloria Vane	Television film
1993–94	Frasier	Danielle, Madeline Marshall	2 episodes
1994	Batman: The Animated Series	May, June	Voice, episode: "Sideshow"
1994	Parallel Lives	Winnie Winslow	Television film
1994	Voices from Within	Nancy Parkhurst	Television film
1995	A Season of Hope	Elizabeth Hackett	Television film
1995–1996	The Client	Reggie Love	Main role
1996	Ruby Jean and Joe	Rose	Television film
1996	Breaking Through	Pam Willis	Television film
1998	From the Earth to the Moon	Marge Slayton	Episode: "The Original Wives Club"
1998	A Chance of Snow	Madeline 'Maddie' Parker-Hill	Television film
1998	Stories from My Childhood	Queen Hildegard	Voice, episode: "The Wild Swans"
1999	Payne	Constance 'Connie' Payne	Main role
1999	Justice	Jane Newhart	Television film
1999	It Came from the Sky	Alice Bridges	Television film
1999	Jackie's Back	Jo Face	Television film
2000	Trapped in a Purple Haze	Sophie Hanson	Television film
2000	The Norm Show	Claire Stackhouse	Episode: "Norm vs. Youth"
2001	The Ponder Heart	Edna Earle Ponder	Television film
2001	The Guardian	Sarah	Episode: "Heart"
2002	E! True Hollywood Story	Herself	Episode: "Curse of Poltergeist"
2002	Law & Order: Special Victims Unit	Mrs. Rawley	Episode: "Waste"
2002	I Love the '80s	Herself	Documentary miniseries
2003	Judging Amy	Gemma Lawnsdale	Episode: "Judging Eric"
2003	Skin	Dr. Sara Rose	Episode: "Endorsement"
2003	Miss Match	Lianne Fox	3 episodes
2004	Strong Medicine	Margie	Episode: "Fractured"
2005	14 Hours	Jeanette Makins	Television film
2005	Into the Fire	June Sickles	Television film
2005	Las Vegas	Liz	Episode: "The Real McCoy"
2006	24	Miriam Henderson	Episode: "Day 5: 5:00 p.m.-6:00 p.m."
2006	Numb3rs	Margaret Eppes	Episode: "Hot Shot"
2006	Criminal Minds	Prof. Ursula Kent	Episode: "Empty Planet"
2006	Worst Week of My Life	Libby	Episode: "Pilot"
2006	Twenty Good Years	Kate	Episode: "Remember the Alimony"
2006	Stroller Wars	Roberta	Television film
2006–2007	The Nine	Sheryl Kates	2 episodes
2007	Sybil	Hattie Dorsett	Television film
2007	Dexter	Gail Brandon	Guest role (season 2) Episode: That Night, A Forest Grew
2008	Life in General	Mary Kate Walton	Webseries
2009	Uncorked	Sophia Browning	Television film
2009–2011	Private Practice	Bizzy Forbes	
2011	NCIS	Leona Phelps	Episode: "One Last Score"
2011	Law & Order: LA	Mrs. Walker	Episode: "Benedict Canyon"
2011	Love's Christmas Journey	Mrs. Beatrice Thompson	Television film
2011–2015	Hart of Dixie	Candice Hart	Guest role (seasons 1–4)
2012	Scandal	Sandra Harding	Episode: "Hell Hath No Fury"
2013	Mistresses	Janet	Episode: "Guess Who's Coming to Dinner"
2013–2015	Perception	Margaret Pierce	2 episodes
2014	In My Dreams	Charlotte Smith	Television film
2014	Extant	Leigh Kern	2 episodes
2014–2015	Marry Me	Myrna Schuffman	Recurring role
2015	Your Family or Mine	Ricky Weston	Main role
2016	Childrens Hospital	Linda	Episode: "DOY"
2016	Home	Helen	Television film
2016	Rizzoli & Isles	Tilly Dunn	Episode: "For Richer or Poorer"
2018	The Good Doctor	Ruth	Episode: "She"
2018	Living Biblically	Diana	Episode: "Let Us Pray"
2023	A Million Little Things	Lana Strobe	Episode: "Dear Diary"

=== Stage ===
Year	Title	Role	Notes
1974	The Daughter-in-Law	Minnie Gascoyne	McCarter Theatre
1974	The Threepenny Opera	Polly Peachum	Williamstown Theatre Festival
1974	Ah, Wilderness!	Muriel McComber	Williamstown Theatre Festival
1974	Juno and the Paycock	Mrs. Coyne	Williamstown Theatre Festival
1977	A History of the American Film	Clara Mortimer	Arena Stage
1979	Ladyhouse Blues	Dot	ANTA Playhouse, Off-Broadway
1980	A Coupla White Chicks Sitting Around Talking	Maude Mix (Replacement)	Astor Place Theatre, Off-Broadway
1982	Gardenia	Lydie Breeze	Manhattan Theatre Club, Off-Broadway
2008	The Quality of Life	Dinah	Geffen Playhouse
2008	The Quality of Life	Dinah	American Conservatory Theater
2008	Body Awareness	Joyce	Atlantic Theater Company, Off-Broadway
2009	The Night is a Child	Harriet Eason	Pasadena Playhouse
2011	A Doll House	Mrs. Linde	L.A. Theatre Works
2012	The Fall To Earth	Fay Schorsch	Odyssey Theatre Ensemble
2013	Other Desert Cities	Polly Wyeth	Mark Taper Forum
2013	The Columnist	Susan	L.A. Theatre Works
2017	A Funny Thing Happened on the Way to the Gynecologic Oncology Unit at Memorial Sloan-Kettering Cancer Center of New York City	Marcie	Geffen Playhouse
2019	Grand Horizons	Nancy	Williamstown Theatre Festival
