= In a Child's Name =

Drama miniseries for TV

In a Child's Name is a 4-hour mini-series televised on CBS in November 1991. Baby Andrew's biological mother was murdered by his father and a custody battle ensues between the father's parents and the mother's sister played by Valerie Bertinelli.

== Plot ==
Ken Taylor (Michael Ontkean) lives in New Jersey and is a dentist in Staten Island, NY. He marries Teresa Silvano. On their honeymoon, Teresa is mysteriously beaten within an inch of her life. At the hospital, she tells her sister Angela that she cannot remember what happened and that Ken did not beat her.

Ken's partners kick him out of his dental office partnership for stealing money from the vault (Ken might have an addiction to cocaine). Teresa gives birth to their son, named Andrew. Ken murders Teresa and puts her body in the trunk of his car. He drives Andrew and his wife's dead body to Indiana to give physical custody of Andrew to his parents. On the way back to New Jersey, Ken abandons the body in Pennsylvania. He calls Teresa's sister Angela Cimarelli (Valerie Bertinelli) and tells her that Teresa is a drug addict and that she is in a drug rehab center.

The police eventually find the dead body and arrest Ken, who is later found guilty of murder. His parents and Angela share custody of Andrew for a while. Ken's parents tried to legally adopt Andrew, but the state of Indiana declares the adoption void. Angela and her husband Jerry Cimarelli (Christopher Meloni) gain full parental custody of Andrew within a four-year time span.

The movie was based on a true story.

== Cast ==
- Valerie Bertinelli as Angela Silvano-Cimarelli
- Christopher Meloni as Jerry Cimarelli
- Michael Ontkean as Ken Taylor
- Timothy Carhart as Lieutenant Robert Fausak
- David Huddleston as Zach Taylor
- Louise Fletcher as Jean Taylor
- John Karlen as Joe Silvano
- Joanna Merlin as Frances Silvano
- Karla Tamburrelli as Teresa Silvano-Taylor
- Andy Hirsch as Andrew Silvano
- Eric Tilley as Tom Taylor
- Nancy McLoughlin as Marilyn Taylor
- Vincent Guastaferro as Malinouski
- Mitchell Ryan as Peter Chappell
- Caroline Kava as Janice Miller
- Randal Patrick as Ray Engler
- Jeff Allin as Edward Lindsay
- Dennis Cockrum as Gregg Reid
- Lou Criscuolo as Peter Maas
- Amy Lord as Karen Oliveria
- Rick Warner as Carl Stampler
- Caroline Dollar as Astrid
- Frank Hoyt Taylor as Reverend John Hickman
- Sam Vlahos as Dr. Vargas
- C.K. Bibby as Dr. Longwell
- Robert C. Treveiler as Dr. Kingston
- Bob Tyson as Dr. Hill
- Mark Joy as Lawyer Norton
- Tom Mason as Judge Shipp
- Mert Hatfield as Judge Pendleton
- Terry Loughlin as Judge Neuwirth
- Linda Pierce as Judge Skinner
- John Bennes as Judge Myrick
- Susan Rohrer as Judge Langdon
- Randell Haynes as Judge Kittleston
- Alma Martinez as Sorayda (uncredited)
- James Cromwell as Thomas Hobbes (uncredited)

== See also ==
- Murder of Janet March
