= Desert Bloom (film) =

1986 film

- Theatrical release poster
- Directed by: Eugene Corr
- Written by: Eugene Corr; Linda Remy
- Produced by: Michael Hausman
- Starring: Jon Voight; JoBeth Williams; Ellen Barkin; Allen Garfield; Annabeth Gish
- Cinematography: Reynaldo Villalobos
- Edited by: Cari Coughlin
- Music by: Brad Fiedel
- Production company: Carson Productions
- Distributed by: Columbia Pictures
- Release dates: January 24, 1986 (US Film Festival); April 18, 1986 (United States)
- Running time: 105 minutes
- Country: United States
- Language: English
- Budget: $5 million
- Box office: $416,393

Desert Bloom is a 1986 American drama film directed by Eugene Corr and starring an ensemble cast led by Jon Voight and JoBeth Williams. It was screened in the Un Certain Regard section at the 1986 Cannes Film Festival and funded through the Sundance Film Festival Institute.

== Plot ==
Six years after World War II has ended, Jack Chismore, a veteran suffering from PTSD, runs a gas station in Las Vegas, Nevada.

Jack is married to Lily, and stepfather to Lily's three daughters including Rose, a teenager at an impressionable age. Lily's sister, Starr, has come to Las Vegas for a quick divorce and comes to live with them, upsetting the routine of what is already a small and cramped house.

Lily lands a job with the Atomic Testing Office and cannot tell Jack or the girls when the military is conducting atomic-bomb testing in the desert region nearby. This embitters and frustrates Jack, who takes his anger out on Rose many times.

When Rose runs away, it is Jack who shows the most courage and concern.

== Cast ==
- Annabeth Gish as Rose Chismore
- Jon Voight as Jack Chismore
- JoBeth Williams as Lily Chismore
- Ellen Barkin as Aunt Starr
- Jay Underwood as Robin (as Jay D. Underwood)
- Desiree Joseph as Dee Ann Chismore
- Dusty Balcerzak as Barbara Jo Chismore
- Allen Garfield as Mr. Mosol
- Tressi Loria as Shelly
- Laura Rasmussen as Meryl
- William Lang as Colonel
- Jim McCarthy as Driver
- Ann Risley as Mrs. Muratore
- Steven Mastroieni as Nick

== Reception ==
In the Chicago Sun-Times, critic Roger Ebert wrote:

Desert Bloom contains the material for a very good film and it certainly contains the performances, but it moves in too many directions and contains too many issues. It's about the bomb, McCarthyism, the role of women, alcoholism and child abuse, and it's a wonder it doesn't get around to gambling.

There are scenes that start out as perfectly observed moments and end up as a series of speeches as the movie tries to keep track of all of its issues. If they had just gone through and strengthened the characters and allowed the messages to find themselves, they would have really had something here.

Gene Siskel, however, disagreed with Ebert on this film, calling it a "near classic" and unforgettable, singling out Annabeth Gish's performance as Rose.

On the review aggregator site Rotten Tomatoes, the film has a 71% ("Fresh") approval rating, based on 14 reviews; and an average rating of 3.6 out of 5 stars.
