= Welcome Home (1989 film) =

1989 drama film directed by Franklin J. Schaffner

- Promotional film poster
- Directed by: Franklin Schaffner
- Written by: Maggie Kleinman
- Produced by: Martin Ransohoff
- Starring: Kris Kristofferson; JoBeth Williams; Sam Waterston; Brian Keith; Kieu Chinh
- Cinematography: Fred J. Koenekamp
- Edited by: Robert Swink
- Music by: Henry Mancini
- Distributed by: Columbia Pictures
- Release date: September 29, 1989
- Running time: 96 minutes
- Country: United States
- Language: English
- Budget: $11 million
- Box office: $1,048,322

Welcome Home is a 1989 American drama film written by Maggie Kleinman, and directed by Franklin Schaffner. It was the last film directed by Schaffner, who died two months prior to its release. This film stars Kris Kristofferson as a Vietnam War veteran who returns to his family and tries to readjust to life after a nearly 20-year absence. The film also stars JoBeth Williams, Brian Keith, and Sam Waterston. The theme song for the film, "Welcome Home" was performed by Willie Nelson.

== Plot ==
A very sick man is rescued and taken somewhere in Cambodia, close to the border with Vietnam, where he receives help. The man is US Air Force officer Jake Robbins, who had been shot down while in a combat mission in Vietnam and then made a prisoner of war. Jake managed to escape but then realizes that it is really dangerous to leave the jungle, so he decides to hide there. Some years later he marries a local woman and has two children. Since he had been reported missing and presumed dead, his American wife, Sarah, mourned him and eventually moved on with her life and remarried to another man named Woody. Back in Cambodia, Jake gets very sick and the US government manages to take him to Cambodia, but without his new family. The US military tells him that he had been declared missing in action years earlier and that all of his family in America had been informed about it. In addition, the US military tells him that he can go back home in America, but that he has to maintain a low profile since the topic of MIA is very complicated. Jake agrees but under the condition that his new family will be allowed to join him later in America. Jake returns home without telling anyone back home. Jake's reappearance is a blessing for his father, Harry, who tells him that Sarah remarried and that he has a son that was born several months after he left for Vietnam, something that Jake did not know. Jake's return is a mixed blessing for Sarah. Initially, the son, Tyler, sees Jake as a threat to his family, and does not want to do anything with him. Overwhelmed at home, Jake decides to find out where his Southeast Asian wife and children are. He leaves for Cambodia and eventually finds out that his wife had died and his children were in a refugee camp. Jake finds his children and takes them to America to live with him and Harry. Tyler has a change of heart and decides to go visit Jake, his half brother and sister and embrace them.

== Cast ==
- Kris Kristofferson as Jake
- JoBeth Williams as Sarah
- Sam Waterston as Woody
- Brian Keith as Harry
- Thomas Wilson Brown as Tyler
- Trey Wilson as Colonel Barnes
- John Marshall Jones as Dwayne
- Ken Pogue as Senator Camden
- Kieu Chinh as Leang

== Production ==
Filming took place in July–August 1988 in Vermont, Toronto and Kingston. Part of the finance came from the Rank Organisation.

== Box office and critical reception ==
The film was not a box-office success. In his two-star review, film critic Roger Ebert stated that the film had the materials for a potentially great movie but not the energy, stating that the film "sort of rests there on the screen."

Movie historian Leonard Maltin's TV, Movie & Video Guide gave the picture 2 out of a possible 4 stars, citing it as "tolerably sincere at best, embalmed at worst."

== Legacy ==
Unlike the similarly named Welcome Home, Johnny Bristol, which features an Army conspiracy theory that turns out to be delusion, Welcome Home features a conspiracy of silence with regard to Vietnam War prisoners which is all too real.
