= Adam: His Song Continues =

1986 television film

Adam: His Song Continues is a 1986 television film. It is a sequel to the 1983 film Adam, about the real life murder of Adam Walsh. The film was directed by Robert Markowitz and written by Oliver Hailey. The original film's cast reprised their roles, including Daniel J. Travanti as Adam's father John Walsh and JoBeth Williams as Adam's mother Reve. It premiered on NBC on October 10, 1986.

== Reception ==
The film received mixed reviews from critics. John J. O'Conner of The New York Times criticized the film for having a weaker narrative and less accuracy than the first film. A review from the Los Angeles Times praised it as a "real, honest and very heroic story". Lenore Skenazy of Reason listed the film as one of the most influential "stranger danger" films.
