= Aubrey Dollar =

American actress

- Born: Raleigh, North Carolina, U.S.
- Education: Boston University; Amherst College
- Occupation: Actress
- Years active: 1992–present
- Children: 1
- Relatives: Caroline Dollar (sister)

Aubrey Dollar is an American actress. She is known for playing Marina Cooper on the CBS daytime soap opera Guiding Light from 2001 to 2004. Dollar has also starred in the television series Point Pleasant (2005–2006), Women's Murder Club (2007–2008), Battle Creek (2015), and Filthy Rich (2020).

== Life and career ==
Aubrey Dollar was born in Raleigh, North Carolina, and studied at Needham B. Broughton High School, where she was a classmate of fellow actor Colin Fickes. She attended Boston University and Amherst College. Her younger sister, Caroline, is also an actress.

From 2001 to 2004, Dollar played Marina Cooper in the soap opera, Guiding Light. She is known for her roles as Judy Kramer in Point Pleasant, a 2005 series on Fox, and as Marcy Bender in Dawson's Creek. From 2007 to 2008, Dollar starred as Cindy Thomas on the ABC television series Women's Murder Club. She starred in the 2012 NBC pilot Happy Valley which was not picked up. She guest starred in Ugly Betty, The Good Wife, Person of Interest, and Weeds. Dollar appeared in a recurring role on the ABC supernatural drama series, 666 Park Avenue in 2012.

Dollar was a cast member of the 2015 CBS series Battle Creek, which was cancelled after one season.

She starred in a stage play called The Cake written by This Is Us writer and producer Bekah Brunstetter in 2018.

== Filmography ==
=== Film ===
Year	Title	Role	Notes
1992	Children of the Corn II: The Final Sacrifice	Naomi Johnson	
1995	Heavyweights	Camp Magnolia Girl	
1995	Other Voices, Other Rooms	Idabell Thompkins	
2002	Crazy Little Thing	Gina Vosola	
2005	Prime	Michelle	
2005	Backseat	Shelle	
2006	Failure to Launch	Pizza Waitress	
2006	Save the Last Dance 2	Zoe	Direct-to-video film
2006	Hard Luck	Rain	Direct-to-video film
2011	The Best Man for the Job	Diane	
2012	See Girl Run	Becky	
2013	One Small Hitch	Molly Mahoney	
2023	Pain Hustlers	Andy	

=== Television ===
Year	Title	Role	Notes
1995	Murderous Intent	Lisa Talbot	Television film
1995	American Gothic	Janice	Episode: "Strong Arm of the Law"
1996	Kiss and Tell	Candy Stripper	Television film
1999	Dawson's Creek	Marcy Bender	4 episodes
2000	Students vs. School Violence	N/A	Television film
2000	Dawson's Creek	Sage the Anxiety Girl	Episode: "Kiss Kiss Bang Bang"
2001	Amy & Isabelle	Karen Keane	Television film
2001	Going to California	Kara	Episode: "Apocalypse Cow"
2002	The Education of Max Bickford	Nancy	Episode: "The Cost of Living"
2002	Trapped: Buried Alive	Paige Cooper	Television film
2001–2004	Guiding Light	Marina Cooper	Series regular
2005–2006	Point Pleasant	Judy Kramer	Main role
2007–2008	Women's Murder Club	Cindy Thomas	Main role
2009	Cupid	Robin 'Peaches' Peachtree	Episode: "Shipping Out"
2010	Ugly Betty	Marisa	Episode: "Smokin' Hot"
2011	The Good Wife	Nurse Zoe Gilman	Episode: "In Sickness"
2011	Person of Interest	Marie Klein	Episode: "Foe"
2012	Happy Valley	Hope	Unsold television pilot
2012	Blue Bloods	Sandy Huffman	Episode: "Leap of Faith"
2012	Weeds	Joanna Jacobs	Episodes: "Saplings", "Threshold"
2012	666 Park Avenue	Annie Morgan	Episodes: "The Dead Don't Stay Dead", "Hero Complex"
2015	Battle Creek	Holly Dale	Main role
2018	Main Justice	Ellis	Unsold television pilot
2020	Filthy Rich	Rose Monreaux	Main role
