= All Is Forgiven (TV series) =

American television series

- Created by: Howard Gewirtz; Ian Praiser
- Starring: Bess Armstrong; Carol Kane; Terence Knox; Shawnee Smith; Valerie Landsburg; David Alan Grier
- Composer: Robert Kraft
- Country of origin: United States
- Original language: English
- No. of seasons: 1
- No. of episodes: 9

Production
- Executive producers: James Burrows; Glen Charles; Les Charles
- Camera setup: Multi-camera
- Running time: 30 minutes
- Production companies: Charles/Burrows/Charles Productions; Paramount Television

Original release
- Network: NBC
- Release: March 20 – June 12, 1986

All is Forgiven is an American sitcom television series created by Howard Gewirtz and Ian Praiser, that aired on NBC from March 20 until June 12, 1986, with the premiere episode being repeated as a "special presentation" on August 23, 1986. Bess Armstrong starred in the series as Paula Russell.

== Premise ==
Paula Russell is the producer of a soap opera called All is Forgiven who just married a doughnut executive with a teenage daughter.

== Cast ==
- Bess Armstrong as Paula Russell
- Terence Knox as Matt Russell
- Carol Kane as Nicolette Bingham
- Shawnee Smith as Sonia Russell
- Valerie Landsburg as Lorraine Elder
- Judith-Marie Bergan as Cecile Porter-Lindsey
- David Alan Grier as Oliver Royce
- Bill Wiley as Wendell Branch
- Debi Richter as Sherry Levy

== Syndication ==
The series was shown in repeats on the A&E cable network through 1988, and on Ha! two years later and later Comedy Central for a brief time in June 1991.

== Episodes ==
No.	Title	Directed by	Written by	Original release date
1	"On-Air Commitment"	James Burrows	Kimberly Hill	March 20, 1986
Paula gets the job as the producer of a soap opera on the same day she is getting married.
2	"With Child"	James Burrows	Ian Praiser, Howard Gewirtz, Glen Charles and Les Charles	March 27, 1986
Sonia's visit looks to be more permanent and might ruin Paula and Matt's honeymoon in Mexico.
3	"And Sonia Makes Three"	Jim Drake	Norm Gunzenhauser and Tom Seeley	March 29, 1986
Paula doesn't want to be intimate with Matt now that Sonia is also living in the apartment.
4	"Past Perfect"	Barnet Kellman	Miriam Trogdon	April 5, 1986
Nicolette gets a visit from a man from her past.
5	"Mother's Day"	Barnet Kellman	Kimberly Hill	April 12, 1986
Paula tries to be a mother to Sonia when Matt has to leave town.
6	"And Justice for Oliver (a.k.a. And Justice for Ollie)"	Barnet Kellman	Bob Rosenfarb	April 19, 1986
Nicolette doesn't like a scene that Oliver has written for the show. Matt tries to spend some quality time with Paula and Sonia.
7	"I Can't Say No"	Jeff Chambers	Ian Praiser and Howard Gewirtz	May 29, 1986
Wendell gets a visit from a former girlfriend who acts like they never broke up.
8	"Paula Russell II"	Jeff Chambers	Janet Leahy	June 5, 1986
Sonia sets up a meeting between Paula and Matt's ex-wife.
9	"Matt at the Barricades"	Jeff Chambers	Joe Fisch	June 12, 1986
Matt and an old college friend protest against pollution.

== Ratings ==
No.	Title	Air Date	Time	Rank	Rating	Viewers (Millions)
1	On-Air Commitment	March 20, 1996	Thursday at 9:30 P.M.	#7 of 65	22.4	19.2
2	With Child	March 27, 1986	Thursday at 9:30 P.M.	#13 of 65	19.1	16.4
3	And Sonia Makes Three	March 29, 1986	Saturday at 9:30 P.M.	#20 of 65	16.9	14.5
4	Past Perfect	April 5, 1986	Saturday at 9:30 P.M.	#32 of 67	15.2	13.0
5	Mother's Day	April 12, 1986	Saturday at 9:30 P.M.	#24 of 71	16.8	14.4
6	And Justice for Oliver (a.k.a. And Justice for Ollie)	April 19, 1986	Saturday at 9:30 P.M.	#32 of 64	14.5	13.3
7	I Can't Say No	May 29, 1986	Thursday at 9:30 P.M.	#5 of 64	19.4	16.5
8	Paula Russell II	June 5, 1986	Thursday at 9:30 P.M.	#9 of 66	17.5	15.0
9	Matt at the Barricades	June 12, 1986	Thursday at 9:30 P.M.	#4 of 69	18.6	16.0

Source: A.C. Nielsen Company via Los Angeles Times
