= Jabberwocky (TV series) =

American children's television series

- Jabberwocky main title
- Starring: Tucker Smallwood; JoBeth Williams; Robert Prosky; Carl Thoma; Joanne Sopko; Peter Johnson
- Country of origin: United States

Original release
- Network: WCVB-TV
- Release: 1972 – 1974

Jabberwocky is an American daily children's television program designed for 5–10 year-olds that went into national syndication. The original series ran Monday through Friday for over two seasons, from 1972 to 1974, on WCVB-TV in Boston. Starting in 1974, the nationally syndicated version ran weekly and was rerun in the early hours of Saturday mornings by many television stations up until the 1990s.

== Synopsis and history ==
Created and videotaped by WCVB-TV Channel 5 Boston, Jabberwocky featured real actors and puppets and various interstitial cartoons. The "show within a show" concept featured actress JoBeth Williams—in one of her earliest roles—and actor Tucker Smallwood as the "lead performer" and "director" respectively of a children's show. The actress and director were played by Joanne Sopko and Carl Thoma in the first season. Harvard professor and psychologist Jerome Kagan was an advisor to the program.

The friendly antagonist in most episodes was puppet character Dirty Frank, who popped up from whatever packing crate was convenient. As a representative alter-ego for children, Dirty Frank's inquisitive nature and his sloppy behavior drove the plot of most episodes.

Another main character was the helpful and venerable Mr. Buchanan (actor Robert Prosky), a human handyman-prop master who concocted various inventions to help children in his backstage workshop. In many episodes, Mr. Buchanan's failed inventions and grandfatherly insights led the characters toward answers to their questions.

The characters were seen in a studio set, but episodes often took them out into the Greater Boston area for miniature documentary segments.

Co-creators Fred Schilpp (Executive Producer) and Adam Villone (Head Writer) wrote many of the episodes along with Dewey Bergman and Joseph A. Bailey. Tucker Smallwood was also an occasional segment writer for the show. The animation sequences, and the puppets, were created by Tom and Bob Jurkowski. The original theme music was written and produced by David Lucas of David Lucas Associates, a commercial music house in New York. Gail Frank was Producer and eventually became Executive Producer. Peter Johnson, the puppeteer, was trained by Caroll Spinney (Big Bird) from Sesame Street and Children's Television Workshop.

The value-based program won several major broadcasting awards including a citation from Action for Children's Television, the first ever given to a commercial television program.

== Reruns and syndication ==
WCVB-TV continued to air Jabberwocky well after it went out of production, as it became part of the station's past legacy of original local programming (for over two decades, WCVB was known for producing more local programming than any other station in the U.S.). By the mid-to-late 1980s, the show could always be seen Saturday mornings at 5 a.m., followed by off-network reruns and later, in the 1990s, by syndicated children's programming that lead up to ABC's Saturday Morning lineup (most notably Cappelli & Company). However, WCVB did venture into original children's programming post-Jabberwocky; subsequent shows included The Nature World of Captain Bob, Pixanne, Rainbow, Rapmatazz and A Likely Story.

By 2000, after continually airing for more than 25 years, Jabberwocky, along with classic airings of The Nature World of Captain Bob, vanished off the station's schedule.
