= That's Incredible! =

American reality television series

- John Davidson (left), Cathy Lee Crosby (middle) and Fran Tarkenton (right); from ABC promotional photography.
- Genre: Reality
- Created by: Alan Landsburg Productions
- Presented by: John Davidson; Fran Tarkenton; Cathy Lee Crosby
- Country of origin: United States
- Original language: English
- No. of seasons: 5

Production
- Producer: Alan Landsburg
- Running time: 60 minutes
- Production company: Alan Landsburg Productions

Original release
- Network: ABC
- Release: March 3, 1980 – March 4, 1984

Related
- Incredible Sunday

That's Incredible! is an American reality television show that aired on the ABC television network from 1980 to 1984. In the tradition of You Asked for It, Ripley's Believe It or Not! and Real People, the show featured people performing stunts and reenactments of allegedly paranormal events. The show also often featured people with unusual talents, such as speed-talker John Moschitta Jr., who made his first national television appearance on the show, as well as scientific, medical, and technological breakthroughs such as the Taser and cryogenic corneal reshaping by lathe keratomileusis. The show's catchphrase, said by one of its hosts at the conclusion of a segment, was the same as its title: "That's incredible!"

== Synopsis ==
The show was co-hosted by Fran Tarkenton, John Davidson and Cathy Lee Crosby, and was produced by Alan Landsburg Productions. Originally aired as an hour-long program, episodes were later re-edited into 30-minute segments for syndication. It debuted on March 3, 1980.

A number of the stunts performed were dangerous, including juggling knives, staying inside a small box for hours, and one involving a man supposedly catching a bullet between his teeth. The dangerous nature of these stunts eventually prompted producers to augment the footage with the caption "Do Not Try This Yourself". Steve Baker, also known as "Mr. Escape", was frequently featured on the show.

In 1980, Tiger Woods appeared on the show at the age of 5, displaying his ability to putt a golf ball into a hole from different areas.

== Nielsen ratings ==
The show ranked in the top 30 for its first four seasons, and ranked at #3 during its first season, but fell out of the top 50 during its final season.

1. 1979–80: #3 (25.8 rating)
2. 1980–81: #22 (20.5 rating)
3. 1981–82: #28 (18.4 rating)
4. 1982–83: #22 (18.3 rating)
5. 1983–84: #58 (14.6 rating)

== Spin-off ==
Those Amazing Animals is a reality television series about animals and their extraordinary lives. It was hosted by Burgess Meredith, Jim Stafford and Priscilla Presley. Also appearing were explorer Jacques-Yves Cousteau, undersea photographers Ron and Valerie Taylor, and Joan Embery of the San Diego Zoo. The series aired on ABC on Sunday nights from August 24, 1980, to August 23, 1981.

== Revival ==
That's Incredible! was revived for the 1988–89 season, hosted by Davidson, Cristina Ferrare and Tracey Gold, as Incredible Sunday.

== Syndication ==
The show was seen weekends on Retro Television Network. It was also broadcast overseas in Australia and New Zealand.
