= South Iredell High School =

American public school in North Carolina

Location
- 299 Old Mountain Rd; Statesville, North Carolina 28677; United States; 35°43′03″N 80°54′36″W

Information
- School type: Public
- Motto: Service, Innovation, Honor, Success
- Founded: 1966 (60 years ago)
- School district: Iredell-Statesville Schools
- CEEB code: 340233
- Principal: Robert Little
- Teaching staff: 78.53 (FTE)
- Grades: 9–12
- Enrollment: 1,711 (2022–23)
- Student to teacher ratio: 21.79
- Colors: Navy blue and gold
- Athletics: NCHSAA 7A
- Athletics conference: North Piedmont 6A/7A
- Team name: Vikings
- Website: southhigh.issnc.org

South Iredell High School is a public school located near Troutman, North Carolina and is part of the Iredell-Statesville school system. South Iredell High is designated an Expected Growth School of Distinction by the North Carolina ABCs Accountability program. It educates students from surrounding areas including Troutman and south Statesville, North Carolina. The school was constructed in 1966 to replace Troutman High School. The school's enrollment was about 800 students in the 2005–2006 school year. Attendance was double that figure before 2002, when Lake Norman High School was created to alleviate South Iredell's overcrowding. In 2018 the school's enrollment had grown to just under 1600 students. The school has options for both traditional schooling and an IB (International Baccalaureate) Program. The school's mascot is the Viking and the school colors are navy blue and gold.

== Television appearance ==
South Iredell High School was the set for the 1989 made-for-television movie The Ryan White Story based on the life of 13-year-old AIDS patient Ryan White.

== Athletics ==
South Iredell High School is a member of the North Carolina High School Athletic Association (NCHSAA) and are classified as a 7A school. They are currently in the North Piedmont 6A/7A Conference which includes: South Iredell (7A); Mooresville (7A); Lake Norman (7A); Davie County (7A) ; Statesville (6A); North Iredell (6A). South Iredell's average daily membership (ADM) is now at 1,841.

=== Wrestling ===
The South Iredell wrestling team is led by Coach Bill Mayhew. Mayhew was inducted into the charter class of the North Carolina Chapter of the National Wrestling Hall of Fame in 1997. He has coached the South Iredell wrestling team since the school opened in 1966. Mayhew broke the North Carolina high school record for most dual meet wrestling wins in 2024, after his 922 career dual win. He won four Western North Carolina High School Activities Association (WNCHSAA) championships with South Iredell in 1970, 1972, 1974, and 1976. His 1986 South Iredell team won the NCHSAA state tournament championship, the last year that all NCHSAA classifications were combined in wrestling.

=== Football ===
In the 2012 NCHSAA 2AA state championship football game, the South Iredell Vikings defeated the Carrboro Jaguars with a final score of 30–27. The team was led by Coach Scott Miller.

=== Volleyball ===
In 2015, the South Iredell Lady Vikings won over Asheboro High School 3–0 for the NCHSAA 3A State Championship. The scores were 25–14, 25–11, and 25–9 for the three sets. South Iredell was ranked 24th in the nation and recognized by MaxPreps in the Tour of Champions. The team was led by head Coach Megan Skouby and assistant Coach Taylor Clendenin. The team had 7 seniors, 4 of which went on to play collegiately.

=== Soccer ===
The South Iredell High School boys soccer team has made four appearances in the NCHSAA state championship game, winning twice. They won the NCHSAA 3A state championship in 1989 and 1994. As of 2024, they have made the NCHSAA state playoffs 35 times. The girls' soccer team made an appearance in the 2013 NCHSAA 3A state championship game, falling to Swansboro High School 3–0.

=== Track and field ===
The South Iredell girls' outdoor track and field team has won individual state championships in the long jump and high jump. The South Iredell boy's outdoor track and field team has won individual state championships in the high jump and 300 meter hurdles.

=== Marching Band Accident ===
A concrete awning collapsed on October 3, 2015, on a group of South Iredell band students who had gathered outside North Iredell High School shortly before a band competition, leaving 22 people injured.
