= Adam (1983 film) =

1983 American made-for-television film

- Genre: Drama
- Written by: Allan Leicht
- Directed by: Michael Tuchner
- Starring: Daniel J. Travanti; JoBeth Williams; Martha Scott; Richard Masur; Paul Regina; Mason Adams
- Theme music composer: Mike Post
- Country of origin: United States
- Original language: English

Production
- Executive producers: Joan Barnett; Alan Landsburg
- Producer: Linda Otto
- Production location: Houston
- Cinematography: Mike Fash
- Editor: Corky Ehlers
- Running time: 100 minutes
- Production company: Alan Landsburg Productions

Original release
- Network: NBC
- Release: October 10, 1983

Adam is a 1983 American made-for-television film starring Daniel J. Travanti and JoBeth Williams. It aired on October 10, 1983, on NBC. On its original air date, it was seen by an audience of 38 million people. It was rebroadcast on April 30, 1984, and rebroadcast again on April 29, 1985. At the end of each broadcast, a series of missing children's photographs and descriptions were displayed on the screen for viewers, and a telephone number was also given for viewers to call if they had any information about them. The 1985 photograph series was introduced by President Ronald Reagan in a pre-recorded message, "...maybe your eyes can help bring them home." A sequel, Adam: His Song Continues, followed on September 29, 1986, also starring Travanti and Williams.

The first part of the film portrays the story of the kidnapping and murder of Adam Walsh on July 27, 1981, along with its effects on the marriage of John and Revé Walsh. The second part focuses on the Walshes' attempts to pass national child protection laws in the wake of Adam's murder, and the formation of awareness groups surrounding child disappearances. The film was written by Allan Leicht and directed by Michael Tuchner.

== Plot ==
July 27, 1981, Hollywood, Florida. John Walsh heads to work while his wife, Revé, and their 6-year-old son Adam head to the Sears store at the Hollywood Mall. Revé lets Adam watch a few other older kids play on an Atari system while she inquires about a lamp that is on sale. After finding out the lamp is sold out, Revé returns and is unable to find Adam. She heads to customer service and has Adam paged over the public address system. She continues searching throughout the mall and runs into her mother-in-law Jean, who helps her search for Adam. Jean calls John and informs him of the situation, causing him to leave work and head to the mall. Unable to find Adam, Revé, calls the police.

John and Revé head to the police station, and become aware of the inadequacies of the police agencies in finding missing children. The next day, John calls the FBI only to find out they will only get involved if there is a ransom demand or evidence of interstate crime. Two weeks later, John and Revé are invited to appear on national television. They travel to New York, where they meet Christian Brown, head of Child Find. Together, they have dinner with Julie Patz, mother of Etan Patz, who disappeared two years earlier.

Later that night, the remains of a young boy are found in a drainage canal in Vero Beach. John is informed of the discovery. The next morning, John and Revé appear on national television. Later that day, they get the news that the remains found were Adam's. John trashes the hotel room and curses the world. After the funeral, John and Revé head to their cabin in upstate New York hoping to relax and find solace. They return to Florida and discover letters from parents of missing children around the country. This inspires John and Revé to open up the Adam Walsh Outreach Center. John and Revé travel to Washington D.C to testify in favor of a bill that would require information about missing children to be entered into the National Crime Information Center. A few months later, around Thanksgiving, Revé discovers that she's pregnant. On July 15, 1982, Revé goes into premature labor and gives birth to a little girl named Meghan. Shortly after, the bill that John and Revé testified in favor of passes in Congress. One day John is giving Meghan a bath when Jean informs him of a telephone a call from the White House.

The real John Walsh appears on screen and confirms it was the White House calling. Walsh explains how he, Meghan, and Revé met the president when he signed the Missing Children Act into law. John then states, "It's too late for our Adam, but it's not too late for the thousands of children who are still out there. For the next two minutes, you will see pictures of children who are still missing. Maybe your eyes could bring them home?" The film ends with a series of missing children's photographs and a phone number for viewers to call if they had any information about them.

== Production ==
Filming was conducted both in and around Houston, Texas. The scenes portrayed at the Hollywood Mall in Hollywood, Florida, were filmed at the now defunct Westwood Mall in Houston, at the Sears which was one of its former anchor stores. The mall closed in 1998 and was converted into offices. The Sears where some scenes were filmed closed in 2017 and was converted to an automobile dealership service center.

The Lamaze scene where Revé went into premature labor was filmed at the Woman's Hospital of Texas.

The three broadcasts of the film were followed by pictures and descriptions of missing children as of each of the respective broadcasts. A hotline was also active, to take calls regarding the children. This was ultimately credited with finding 13 of 55 children from the 1983 broadcast, including future rapper Bizzy Bone, and 19 of 51 children shown in the 1984 broadcast. As of two days after the 1985 showing, 3,522 calls had been made to the hotline, and 5 of 54 featured missing children had already been found.

== Cast ==
- Daniel J. Travanti as John Walsh
- JoBeth Williams as Revé Walsh
- Martha Scott as Gram Jean Walsh
- Richard Masur as Jay Howell
- Paul Regina as Joe Walsh
- Mason Adams as Ray Mellette
- Tony Frank as Lt. Richard Hynds
- John M. Jackson as Det. Jim Gibbons
- Alex Harvey as Det. Jack Hoffman
- Jim O'Donnell as himself
- Elaine O'Donnell as herself

== Awards ==
1984 Primetime Emmy Award nominations:

- Outstanding Drama/Comedy Special (Alan Landsburg, Joan Barnett, executive producers; Linda Otto, producer)
- Outstanding Lead Actor in a Limited Series or a Special (Daniel J. Travanti)
- Outstanding Lead Actress in a Limited Series or a Special (JoBeth Williams)
- Outstanding Writing in a Limited Series or a Special (Allan Leicht)
