= Daniel J. Travanti =

American actor (born 1940)

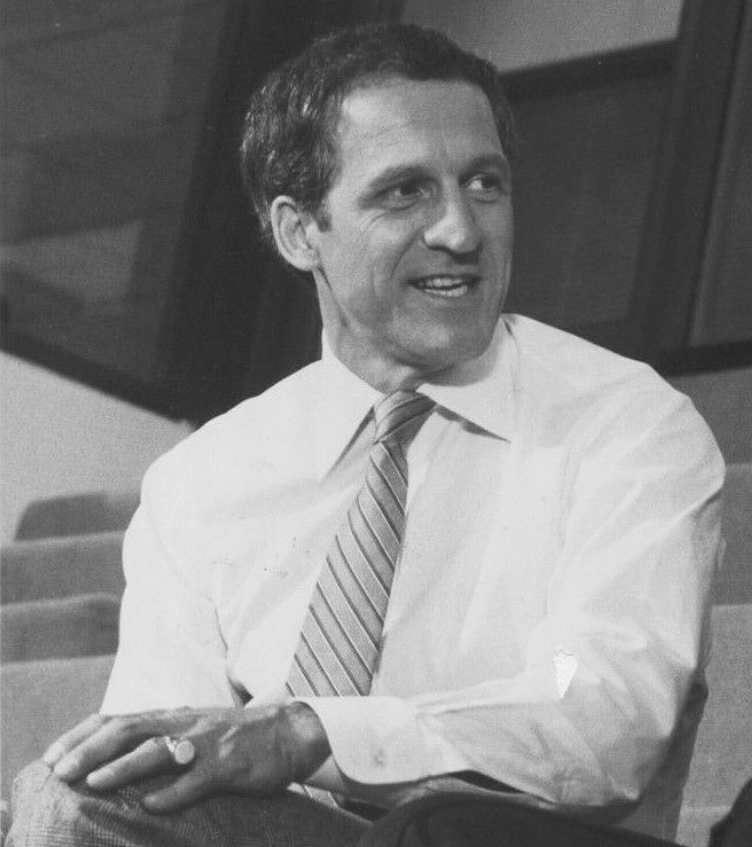
- Travanti in Hill Street Blues, 1983
- Born: Danielo Giovanni Travanti; March 7, 1940 (age 86); Kenosha, Wisconsin, U.S.
- Other names: Dan Travanty; Danny Travanty
- Education: UW–Madison
- Occupation: Actor
- Years active: 1958–2019

Daniel J. Travanti (born Danielo Giovanni Travanti; March 7, 1940) is an American actor. He is best known for playing police captain Frank Furillo in the television drama series Hill Street Blues (1981–1987) for which he received a Golden Globe Award from five nominations, and two consecutive Primetime Emmy Awards from five nominations.

Beyond Hill Street Blues, Travanti starred in the acclaimed television film Adam (1983) as John Walsh, a father whose son is kidnapped and murdered, and portrayed broadcast journalist Edward R. Murrow in Murrow (1986). His early television career included guest appearances on Route 66, Lost in Space, Gunsmoke, and The Bob Newhart Show, as well as roles on the daytime serials The Doctors and General Hospital.

== Early life, family and education ==
Travanti, one of five children, was born in Kenosha, Wisconsin, to Italian immigrant parents John and Elvira Travanti. His father worked at the American Motors assembly plant in that city.

Daniel attended Mary D. Bradford High School, where he was an all-star football player; he received athletic scholarship offers to several colleges, but he decided he wanted to be an actor rather than an athlete. A good student, he was offered scholarships to Harvard University, Princeton University, and the Alfred P. Sloan Scholarship to Dartmouth College, but he took the General Motors Scholarship to attend the University of Wisconsin–Madison, from which he graduated Phi Beta Kappa in 1961. After that, he attended the Yale School of Drama on a Woodrow Wilson fellowship. In 1978, he graduated from Loyola Marymount University with a master's degree in English.

== Career ==
Travanti's first credited role was in "Child of a Night", an episode of Route 66. In 1964, Travanti guest-starred in the episode "Murder by Scandal" of CBS's drama about newspapers, The Reporter. He made his feature film debut in 1965 (credited as "Dan Travanty") playing a deaf mute nightclub bouncer in the psychological thriller Who Killed Teddy Bear? starring Sal Mineo and Juliet Prowse. In 1965, he appeared in an episode of Gidget as a photographer.

In 1966, he played the role of radio talk show host Barney Austin in the Perry Mason episode "The Case of the Midnight Howler". He (credited as Dan Travanty in all four) was the lead guest star in the Season 3 episode "Collision of Planets" of Lost in Space in 1967, appeared in the episode "The Octopus" of the single-season crime drama The Silent Force in late 1970, was featured in the Season 5 episode "Murder Times Three" of Mannix in late 1971, and appeared in the Season 6 episode "Image" of Mission: Impossible in early 1972. Also in 1972, he played a fugitive in the episode "The Devil's Playground" of Cannon with future Hill Street co-star James B. Sikking. In 1974, Travanti appeared briefly in The Bob Newhart Show episode "The Battle of the Groups". Also in 1974, he appeared in a Gunsmoke episode, "Like Old Times", with his future Hill Street co-star Charles Haid.

Travanti earned five nominations and two Emmy Awards for his portrayal of Hill Street Station Captain Frank Furillo. In 1982, Boston's Emerson College chose him as the commencement speaker and gave him an honorary Doctorate degree. In 1983, Travanti starred in the TV movie Adam, for which he received another Emmy nomination. He starred opposite Sophia Loren in Aurora (1984), which premiered on NBC and received a theatrical release in Italy. Travanti has appeared in a number of TV movies and has made appearances in television programs such as Poltergeist: The Legacy (1997) and Prison Break (2005). In 1986, HBO broadcast the made-for-cable biographical film Murrow, with his portrayal of Edward R. Murrow receiving a Cable Ace nomination. He co-starred in the film Millennium (1989) and as Lt. Ray McAuliffe in the television series Missing Persons (1993).

From January to March 2007, Travanti appeared off-Broadway in Oren Safdie's The Last Word... at the Theater at St. Clements in New York City, and from November to December 2008, Travanti played the "Con Melody" in an off-off Broadway production of Eugene O'Neill's A Touch of the Poet for Friendly Fire Theater in New York.

In 2010, he appeared in an episode of Criminal Minds as a 75-year-old serial killer with Alzheimer's disease.

Travanti had a recurring role on the Starz television series Boss. He also appeared on The Twilight Zone Radio Dramas as Captain William Fletcher in the audio adaptation of "The Little People".

Starting in 2017, he played the father of Chris O'Donnell's character (G. Callen) in NCIS: Los Angeles. His final appearance, and final acting role to date, was in a 2019 episode of that series.

== Personal life ==
Early in his career, Travanti struggled with professional frustration and dissatisfaction, which led to alcoholism. The turning point came in 1973 when he sought professional help after collapsing during a theatrical performance in Indianapolis. In an interview, Travanti later recalled the mindset that fueled his addiction. He found sobriety through Alcoholics Anonymous, calling alcoholism a "disease of loneliness and secrecy". In 1981, he made such a confession to Rona Barrett in an interview on NBC and even recited, from memory, all of the organization's "Twelve Steps" on camera. Captain Furillo, his best-known character, was also a recovering alcoholic, and the character was shown multiple times taking part in AA meetings.

== Filmography ==
Many of Travanti's roles prior to the mid-1970s were credited as "Dan Travanty" or "Dan Travanti." Later roles are credited as "Daniel J. Travanti."

=== Film ===
Year	Title	Role	Notes
1965	Who Killed Teddy Bear?	Carlo	
1971	The Organization	Sergeant Chassman	
1976	St. Ives	Johnny Parisi	
1980	It's My Turn	The Interviewer	Uncredited
1988	Midnight Crossing	Morely Barton	
1989	Millennium	Arnold Mayer	
1990	Megaville	Duprell	
1991	Eyes of a Witness	Roy Baxter	
1992	Hello Stranger	Unknown	
1995	Just Cause	The Warden	
1995	Siao Yu	Mario Moretti	
2012	Cicero in Winter	Charlie	Short
2012	One Small Hitch	Max Shiffman	

=== Television ===
Year	Title	Role	Notes
1964	Route 66	Marty Johnson	Episode: "Child of a Night"; First credited role in film or television
1964	East Side/West Side	Paul Jerome	Episode: "The Name of the Game"
1964	The Patty Duke Show	Myron ‘Rock’ Milankovich	Episode: "Block That Statue"
1964	The Reporter	Cutler	Episode: "Murder by Scandal"
1964	The Defenders	Detective Russo	Episode: "The Siege"
1965	Gidget	Tom Brighton	Episode: "Now There's a Face"
1966	The Man from U.N.C.L.E.	Luca	Episode: "The Deadly Goddess Affair" (as Dan Travanty)
1966	Perry Mason	Barney Austin	Episode: "The Case of the Midnight Howler"
1966	Flipper	Commander Willard	2 episodes
1967	Voyage to the Bottom of the Sea	Unknown	Episode: "Shadowman"
1967	Lost in Space	Ilan, Space Hippie	Episode: "Collision of Planets"
1967	Judd for the Defense	Don Oliver	Episode: "A Civil Case of Murder" (as Dan Travanty)
1968	Call to Danger	John Henderson	TV movie
1968	Lancer	Dan Cassidy	Episode: "The Escape" (as Dan Travanty)
1968	Here Come the Brides	Will Sullivan	Episode: "A Jew Named Sullivan" (as Dan Travanty)
1968	The F.B.I.	Roy Blake	Episode: "Death of a Fixer"
1969	The Mod Squad	Milo	Episode: "Child of Sorrow, Child of Light" (as Dan Travanty)
1969	The Mod Squad	George	Episode: "Willie Poor Boy"
1970	The Silent Force	Unknown	Episode: "The Octopus"
1970	The Love War	Ted	ABC Movie of the Week
1970	The F.B.I.	Billy Jack Lyle	Episode: "The Diamond Millstone"
1971	The Interns	Harry Random	Episode: "The Choice"
1971	Mannix	Tom Stabler	Episode: "Murder Times Three"
1972	The F.B.I.	Harry	Episode: "The Franklin Papers"
1972	Mission: Impossible	Tony Gadsen	Episode: "Image"
1974	Gunsmoke	Carl	Episode: "The Colonel" (as Dan Travanty)
1974	Gunsmoke	Barker	Episode: "Like Old Times" (as Dan Travanty)
1974	The Bob Newhart Show	Mr. Gianelli	Episode: "The Battle of the Groups"
1974	Kojak	Lieutenant Chuck Danena	Episode: "A Souvenir from Atlantic City"
1974	The F.B.I.	Professor Grant	Episode: "Confessions of a Madman"
1976	Kojak	Captain Badaduchi	Episode: "A Grave too Soon"
1977	Family	Benjamin Maxwell	Episode: "...More Things in Heaven and Earth"
1979	General Hospital	Spence Andrews	Unknown episodes
1979	Hart to Hart	Edgar	Episode: "Max in Love"
1980	Knots Landing	Lieutenant Steinmetz	Episode: "The Constant Companion"
1981–1987	Hill Street Blues	Captain Frank Furillo	Main cast Golden Globe Award for Best Actor – Television Series Drama (1981); Primetime Emmy Award for Outstanding Lead Actor in a Drama Series (1981–1982); Viewers for Quality Television Award for Best Actor in a Quality Drama Series (1985); Nominated—Golden Globe Award for Best Actor – Television Series Drama (1983–1986); Nominated—Primetime Emmy Award for Outstanding Lead Actor in a Drama Series (1983–1985)
1983	Newhart	Himself	Episode: "A View from the Bench"
1983	Adam	John Walsh	TV movie Nominated—Primetime Emmy Award for Outstanding Lead Actor in a Miniseries or a Movie
1984	Aurora	David Ackermann	TV movie
1986	Adam: His Song Continues	John Walsh	TV movie
1986	Murrow	Edward R. Murrow	TV movie Nominated—CableACE Award for Best Actor in a Movie or Miniseries
1988	American Playhouse	Gene Garrison	Episode: "I Never Sang for My Father"
1989	Howard Beach: Making a Case for Murder	Joe Hynes	TV movie
1990	Screen Two	Jerry Leavy	Episode: "Fellow Traveller"
1991	Tagget	John Tagget	TV movie
1992	Weep No More, My Lady	Ted	TV movie
1992	The Christmas Stallion	Alan	TV movie
1993	In the Shadows, Someone's Watching	Drum London	TV movie
1993–1994	Missing Persons	Lieutenant Ray McAuliffe	Main cast
1995	The Outer Limits	Thornwell	Episode: "The Voice of Reason"
1995	The Wasp Woman	Dr. Zinthorp	TV movie
1996	To Sir, with Love II	Horace Weaver	TV movie
1997	Poltergeist: The Legacy	William Sloan	Recurring role (Season 2)
2005–2006	Prison Break	President Richard Mills	2 episodes
2006	Murder in My House	Unknown	TV movie
2008	Grey's Anatomy	Barry Patmore	Episode: "Here Comes the Flood"
2010	Criminal Minds	Lee Mullens	Episode: "Remembrance of Things Past"
2011–2012	Boss	Gerald 'Babe' McGantry	Main cast
2016–2019	NCIS: Los Angeles	Nikita Aleksandr Reznikov / Garrison	5 episodes
2016	Chicago Med	Edward Hall	Episode: "Brother's Keeper"
