= Karla Tamburrelli =

American actress and television producer

- Born: 1956 (age 69–70)
- Occupations: Actress; television producer
- Years active: 1984−1998

Karla Tamburrelli (born 1956) is an American actress and television producer. She played detective Darlene Broussard in the television series The Big Easy. In 1993, she was awarded the Joseph Jefferson Award for Best Lead Actress for "Lost in Yonkers" at the Fox Theatre in Chicago, Illinois.

== Stage career ==
Tamburrelli made her professional stage debut in the U.S. national tour of Maury Yeston’s musical Nine in 1984, appearing as Carla.

In Chicago she starred as Grandma Kurnitz in the Royal George Theatre production of Neil Simon’s Lost in Yonkers (1992–1994). The performance earned her the 1993 Joseph Jefferson Award for Actress in a Principal Role.

== Film and television ==
Tamburrelli’s screen career began with guest roles on network series including Miami Vice (1985). She made her feature‑film debut in Die Hard 2 (1990) and appeared in the comedies City Slickers (1991) and Nothing but Trouble (1991).

On television she became a frequent guest star on sitcoms such as Seinfeld, Friends, Mad About You and the crime drama Brooklyn South. She played Detective Darlene “D. B.” Broussard in the first season of The Big Easy.

=== Producing career ===
Tamburrelli joined the production staff of the inaugural Screen Actors Guild Awards ceremony in 1995 and, alongside Yale Summers, was promoted to producer for the 4th awards show in 1998. She remained a lead producer through the 12th ceremony in 2006, supervising entry submissions, nominating‑committee screenings and the live TNT/TBS telecasts.

== Filmography ==
=== Television series ===
Year	Name	Role	Notes
1985	Miami Vice	Ample Annie	2 episodes
1987	1st & Ten	Lorraine Manzak	2 episodes
1988	The Hogan Family	Danielle	1 episode
1988	CBS Summer Playhouse	N/A	1 episode
1990	Dream On	Claire	1 episode
1990	Cop Rock	Gretchen	1 episode
1991	Babes	Saleswoman	1 episode
1991	Civil Wars	N/A	1 episode
1991–1992	Growing Pains	Jodi Creedmore	2 episodes
1992	Who's the Boss?	Ms. Eastman	1 episode
1994	Seinfeld	Daphne	1 episode
1994	Mad About You	Mrs. Astin	1 episode
1994	Hardball	Carol Widmer	1 episode
1994	The Boys Are Back	Casino's Waitress	1 episode
1995	Platypus Man	Eileen	1 episode
1995	Friends	The Teacher	1 episode
1996–1997	The Big Easy	Darlene Broussard	13 episodes
1997	Pearl	Tina	1 episode
1997–1998	Brooklyn South	Vicky Santoro	4 episodes
1997–1998	Working	Receptionist	2 episodes
1998	Maximum Bob	Opal Duvall	1 episode

=== Films ===
Year	Name	Role
1990	Die Hard 2	Stewardess (Northeast Plane)
1990	Maverick Square	Althea
1991	Nothing But Trouble	Dealer #2's Girlfriend
1991	City Slickers	Arlene Berquist
1991	In a Child's Name	Teresa Silvano-Taylor
1992	Forever Young	Blanche Finley
1994	The Counterfeit Contessa	Countess Sofia di Sarzanello
1994	Gambler V: Playing for Keeps	Marchette
1995	Sleep, Baby, Sleep	Tracy Corbett
1995	Fast Company	N/A
1996	Forgotten Sins	Mrs. Gibbons
1997	Plump Fiction	Sister Ruth

=== Theater ===
Year	Name	Role	Locale	City	Ref.
1993	Lost in Yonkers	Grandma Kurnitz	Off Broadway – Fox Theatricals	Chicago, Illinois	
