= Point Pleasant (TV series) =

2005 American television series

- Series title card
- Created by: John McLaughlin; Marti Noxon
- Starring: Elisabeth Harnois; Grant Show; Samuel Page; Aubrey Dollar; Dina Meyer; Cameron Richardson; Clare Carey; Brent Weber; Susan Walters; Richard Burgi
- Theme music composer: Danny Elfman
- Country of origin: United States
- Original language: English
- No. of seasons: 1
- No. of episodes: 13 (3 unaired, 2 released on DVD)

Production
- Executive producers: Marti Noxon; Neal H. Moritz; Marty Adelstein; Dawn Parouse
- Production companies: Adelstein/Parouse Productions; Original Film; 20th Century Fox Television

Original release
- Network: Fox
- Release: January 19 – March 17, 2005

Point Pleasant is a television series that aired on the Fox Network from January 19 to March 17, 2005.

Point Pleasant shared many of the same crew behind the scenes as Fox's other then-recently withdrawn series, Tru Calling. Point Pleasant received the green light three days after production of Tru Calling ceased. Thirteen episodes were filmed, but due to low ratings, Fox only aired the first eight episodes in the United States. Episodes 9 to 11 aired in Sweden; all episodes aired in New Zealand on back-to-back weekdays in mid-2007; all episodes aired in the Netherlands in 2008 and the last two episodes are included in the DVD release.

The show's executive producer was Marti Noxon, who worked closely with Joss Whedon for several seasons on Buffy the Vampire Slayer. For this reason, Point Pleasant initially drew in many of the show's fans, but Point Pleasant had a distinct "soapy" flavor, more in the vein of shows like Melrose Place or The O.C. than Buffy. The resulting drop in viewership eventually led to the show's cancellation. However, advocates of the show point to its gothic tone, its tempered, surprisingly, subtle use of special effects, and the potential of the overall plotline as some of the solid reasons the show should have stayed on air. The plots emphasized humanity's self-centeredness and cruelty to one another as primal reasons for evil.

In 2009, episodes of the series were shown on the Chiller network, including the episodes never shown on Fox.

== Synopsis ==
A young girl named Christina washes up on the shore near Point Pleasant Beach, New Jersey during a violent storm. After being resuscitated by lifeguard Jesse Parker, the girl is taken in by the family of a local doctor (the Kramers) and quickly befriends their teenage daughter (Judy).The show follows Christina's attempts to discover who she really is, and to learn what happened to her mother, who disappeared shortly after Christina was born.

It soon becomes apparent that Christina's presence has a strange, profound effect on the people around her. Emotions are heightened, repressed feelings and secret desires awakened, and inhibitions weakened, turning what once were friendly competitions into bitter rivalries, romantic rivals into violent enemies, and so on. Freak "accidents" have a way of befalling those with whom Christina becomes angry with.

Sinister forces have their eyes on Christina, believing it is the girl's destiny, as the "child of darkness," to "bring [the world] to its knees". Christina is the Antichrist, the child of Satan. The resulting tension between the good and evil aspects of the girl's nature provides the basis for much of the show's conflict and suspense.

Christina is plagued by terrifying visions of death and destruction, glimpses of the dark future she seems destined to help bring about. A handsome, charming stranger named Lucas Boyd arrives in town, determined to help guide Christina toward her destiny, and Jesse Parker, who has become romantically involved with Christina, discovers that he may be the only one who can prevent the girl from ushering in Armageddon. Ultimately, Jesse is able to choose between accepting Christina, which will cause her good side to prevail, or rejecting her, which will cause her evil side to prevail. He rejects her and the series ends in something of a cliffhanger with Christina leaving Point Pleasant as it is engulfed in an apocalyptic holocaust.

== Cast and characters ==
=== Main ===
- Elisabeth Harnois as Christina Nickson, the daughter of Satan
- Grant Show as Lucas Boyd, a half-demon guardian of Christina
- Sam Page as Jesse Parker, a lifeguard and the love interest of Christina
- Aubrey Dollar as Judy Kramer, Christina's best friend and adoptive sister
- Dina Meyer as Amber Hargrove, a conniving real estate agent
- Clare Carey as Sarah Parker, Jesse's mother (episodes 5+, recurring previously)
- Cameron Richardson as Paula Hargrove, former girlfriend of Jesse
- Brent Weber as Terry Burke, Jesse's best friend and Paula's lover
- Susan Walters as Meg Kramer, Judy's mother and adoptive mother of Christina
- Richard Burgi as Dr. Ben Kramer, Judy's father and adoptive father of Christina

=== Recurring ===
- Alex Carter as Sheriff Logan Parker, adoptive father of Jesse, and Point Pleasant's sheriff
- Ned Schmidtke as Father Matthew
- John Diehl as David Burke, father of Terry
- Adam Busch as Wesley Feist aka Wes, Lucas' assistant
- Elizabeth Ann Bennett as Holly, wife of Lucas Boyd who is both dead and alive
- Marcus Coloma as Father Tomas, who is trying to help Christiana not embrace the "Dark Side", but he is secretly harboring feelings for her
- Audrey Marie Anderson as Isabelle Kramer, Judy's deceased sister

=== Notable guest stars ===
- James Morrison as Kingston Nickson, who raised Christina as her father before Point Pleasant
- Aaron Paul as Mark Owens, Judy's love interest
- Steven Brand as Graham, Jesse's first guardian
- Matt Lanter as Nick, Jesse's second guardian
- Dana Davis as Lucinda, Paula's friend
- Aaron Norvell as Deputy Atkins
- Randy Oglesby as Father David
- Jon Hamm as Dr. George Forrester
- Wyatt Alvarez as Young Jesse Parker
- Lisa Zane as Anne Gibson, biological mother of Christina
- Robert Knepper as Presenter at the Dance, a half-demon past dance host
- Peter Allas as Dr. Evett

== Episodes ==
No.	Title	Directed by	Written by	Original release date	Prod. code
1	"Pilot"	Tucker Gates	Marti Noxon and John J. McLaughlin	January 19, 2005	1AJX79
Christina is rescued by local lifeguard Jesse Parker and taken to the home of Dr. Ben Kramer, who offers the girl a place to stay after she quickly befriends his wife and teenage daughter. Christina searches for clues about her mother, who grew up in Point Pleasant and soon realizes that she harbors supernatural powers that could spell trouble for everyone. Meanwhile, Christina's adoptive father struggles with a sinister man, named Lucas Boyd, who has taken an interest in his daughter.
2	"Human Nature"	Rick Rosenthal	Marti Noxon	January 20, 2005	1AJX01
Christina's search for her mother leads her to a local church. Meanwhile, Lucas Boyd moves to Point Pleasant and introduces himself to Christina. Meanwhile, the town's annual boat parade becomes even more competitive than usual (thanks to Christina's presence), and Ben Kramer has an encounter with an old flame.
3	"Who's Your Daddy"	Marita Grabiak	Ben Edlund	January 27, 2005	1AJX02
Christina suffers visions of death and destruction after a confrontation with Lucas Boyd; Boyd has a proposition for Ben Kramer's old flame; Christina confronts her father and Boyd, and learns a thing or two about her true heritage.
4	"The Lonely Hunter"	Mel Damski	Andrea Newman	February 3, 2005	1AJX03
Christina confronts a dangerous admirer out to get rid of Point Pleasant of sin.
5	"Last Dance"	Michael Lange	Zack Estrin	February 10, 2005	1AJX04
Boyd works with Sarah, the wife of the local sheriff, on a church fundraiser; Ben is nervous about his wife's friendship with his former lover; Christina's anger to Paula has devastating consequences.
6	"Secrets and Lies"	Lev L. Spiro	Robert Doherty	February 17, 2005	1AJX05
Christina meets the doctor who delivered her; Boyd is up to no good; Judy and Jesse search for clues of Christina's past.
7	"Unraveling"	David Straiton	Diego Gutierrez	March 10, 2005	1AJX06
The hand of fate prevents Christina and Jesse from leaving Point Pleasant; Ben's wife is plagued by hallucinations involving Lucas Boyd.
8	"Swimming With Boyd"	James A. Contner	Jenny Lynn	March 17, 2005	1AJX07
Christina and Judy investigate Boyd; Jesse learns a secret about his past; Ben's wife continues to descent into madness.
9	"Waking the Dead"	Marita Grabiak	Ben Edlund, Robert Doherty, and Zack Estrin	Unaired	1AJX08
A party in the woods gets out of hand; Jesse learns more about his miraculous heritage; Christina tangles with a demon; Ben Kramer's secrets are revealed.
10	"Hell Hath No Fury Like a Woman Choked"	Mel Damski	Ron Milbauer and Terri Hughes Burton	Unaired	1AJX09
Boyd learns the truth about Jesse; Ben's wife overhears an incriminating conversation.
11	"Missing"	Michael Lange	Andrea Newman and P.K. Simmons	Unaired	1AJX10
A series of unexplained disappearances plague Point Pleasant; Jesse learns that he is destined to destroy Christina; a terrifying vision of the future drives a wedge between the two.
12	"Mother's Day"	Félix Enríquez Alcalá	Zack Estrin and Robert Doherty	October 25, 2005 (Note: Date of DVD release.)	1AJX11
Christina's mother returns; Ben's wife is committed to a psychiatric ward; Jesse learns the role his mother must play in defeating Christina.
13	"Let the War Commence"	Chris Long	Marti Noxon and Jenny Lynn	October 25, 2005	1AJX12
Christina holds the Kramers prisoner in their home as she prepares for her final confrontation with Jesse.
