= The Ryan White Story =

1989 American made-for-television film

- UK VHS cover of The Ryan White Story
- Genre: Drama; Biography
- Written by: Phil Penningroth; John Herzfeld
- Story by: Phil Penningroth
- Directed by: John Herzfeld
- Starring: Judith Light; Lukas Haas; George C. Scott
- Theme music composer: Mike Post
- Country of origin: United States
- Original language: English

Production
- Executive producers: Alan Landsburg; Howard Lipstone; Haim Saban
- Producer: Linda Otto
- Production locations: Russiaville, Indiana; Statesville, North Carolina
- Cinematography: Steven Shaw
- Editor: Robert Florio
- Running time: 105 minutes
- Production companies: Landsburg Company; Saban International

Original release
- Network: ABC
- Release: January 16, 1989

The Ryan White Story is a 1989 American made-for-television biographical drama film starring Lukas Haas, and Judith Light, directed by John Herzfeld. The film first aired on the ABC network on January 16, 1989. It is based on the true story of the American teenager Ryan White, who became a national poster child for HIV/AIDS in the United States, after being expelled from middle school because of his infection. Nielsen ratings estimated that the movie was seen by 15 million viewers on the original airing.

Upon airing, some residents of White's hometown of Kokomo, Indiana, felt that the film unfairly portrayed the town in a negative light. The office of Kokomo mayor Robert F. Sargent was flooded with complaints from across the country. Others in the film included Nikki Cox as Ryan's sister Andrea, Sarah Jessica Parker as Laura, a sympathetic nurse, George Dzundza as Ryan's doctor Kleiman, and George C. Scott as Charles Vaughn Sr., Ryan's attorney from Vaughan & Vaughan, who legally argued against school board authorities. The real life Ryan White made a cameo appearance in the film as another hemophiliac AIDS sufferer named Chad. The film's final scene was filmed at South Iredell High School in Statesville, North Carolina. After its airing, the film was released on VHS in the United Kingdom.

== Plot ==
Ryan White is a teenage hemophiliac who discovers he has contracted AIDS through contaminated blood products, and is then barred from attending school by Western School Corporation in Russiaville, Indiana, located just outside Kokomo. Ryan and his mother Jeanne engage the services of Charles Vaughn Sr., a high-powered attorney to win back his basic rights to attend school. This turns into a prolonged legal battle of multiple appeals, which ends with Ryan being allowed to attend school on the condition he use disposable flatware in the cafeteria and is exempted from physical education. However, Ryan and his family also must deal with bigotry and unfair judgments against them due to the gossip and lack of knowledge about AIDS. The film ends with Jeanne getting a house in a nearby community and Ryan beginning high school, where he is warmly greeted by the students having been educated about AIDS awareness.

== Cast ==
- Lukas Haas as Ryan White
- Judith Light as Jeanne White
- Nikki Cox as Andrea White
- Michael Bowen as Harley
- George Dzundza as Dr. Kleiman
- Sarah Jessica Parker as Laura
- Ryan White as Chad
- Mitch Ryan as Tom
- Grace Zabriskie as Gloria White
- George C. Scott as Charles Vaughan Sr.
- Kathy Wagner as Sue Hatch
- Casey Ellison as Heath

== Reception ==
The film received positive reviews from critics upon the original airing. The New York Times gave a favorable review upon release, stating

"Once again prime-time television entertainment is approaching the subject of AIDS through the case of a hemophiliac youth infected through a transfusion of tainted blood. The vast majority of AIDS patients are homosexuals and drug addicts, but television apparently is not ready to explore these groups with any degree of compassion. Innocent youngsters trapped by circumstances beyond their control provide far easier dramatic hooks for uplift exercises. Still, these stories are indeed heartbreaking and do serve as vehicles for exposing public ignorance and prejudice about AIDS. The Ryan White Story is a good case in point. The key roles are more fleshed out and are handled remarkably well. They hold the film together firmly as the unsettling story unfolds. It is a story not only about ignorance but also about an almost total lack of enlightened community leadership in the city of Kokomo. Residents are understandably concerned and frightened, but panic is allowed to take over. It is not a pretty story. Worse, it is a story that didn't have to happen. Ryan White's story is certainly worth telling."

Hal Erickson of AllMovie gave the film four out of five stars and said: "Despite its inherent sadness, The Ryan White Story is a celebration of an exceptional young human being whose short life touched so many others in a positive, uplifting manner."
