= Linda Otto =

American film director (1940–2004)

- Born: April 4, 1940
- Died: June 27, 2004 (aged 64); Los Angeles, California
- Occupations: Director, producer, casting director
- Spouse: Alan Landsburg

Linda Otto (April 4, 1940 – June 27, 2004) was a producer and casting director as well as a director. She was active from the 1970s to the early 2000s.

== Biography ==
=== Early life ===
Linda Otto was born on April 4, 1940.

=== Career ===
As a casting director her early work included House Of Dark Shadows in 1970 and Night of Dark Shadows in 1971. Later, her casting credits included shows, Mary Tyler Moore Show, Rhoda, Charlie's Angels etc.

In the late 1970s, she worked for her husband's company she was a producer and director. As a producer some of her work included Torn Between Two Lovers in 1979, the TV movie, A Long Way Home in 1981, The Jayne Mansfield Story in 1980. She produced multiple features throughout the 1980s. In 1990, she had a part in the made-for-television movie Crash: The Mystery of Flight 1501, where she played the part of Harriet. Her final production work was The Lottery, Country Justice in 1997 and finally the documentary Living Dolls: The Making of a Child Beauty Queen in 2001.

Shortly before her death, she produced a documentary called Destined to Live, drawing upon the experiences of cancer survivors and her own.

=== Personal life ===
She married Alan Landsburg in 1976. They resided in Beverly Hills, California.

== Death ==
She died in Los Angeles on June 27, 2004, aged 64. She was survived by her husband, two daughters and a son.

== Director ==
=== Movies ===
- Unspeakable Acts -(TV) – 1990
- A Mother's Right: The Elizabeth Morgan Story (TV) – 1993
- Not in My Family (TV) – 1993
- Gregory K (TV) – 1993

=== Documentary ===
America Undercover (TV series documentary) – 1992

== Producer ==
=== Movies ===
- Country Justice (TV) – 1997
- 1996 The Lottery (TV) – 1996
- Gregory K (TV) – 1993
- In Defense of a Married Man (TV) – 1990
- The Ryan White Story (TV) – 1989
- Quiet Victory: The Charlie Wedemeyer Story (TV) - 1988
- Strange Voices (TV) – 1987
- The George McKenna Story (TV) – 1986
- Adam: His Song Continues (TV) – 1986
- Bill: On His Own (TV) 1983
- Adam (TV) – 1983
- A Long Way Home (TV) – 1981
- The Jayne Mansfield Story (TV) – 1980
- Marathon (TV) – 1980
- Torn Between Two Lovers (TV) – 1979

=== Documentary ===
- Living Dolls: The Making of a Child Beauty Queen (TV)- 2001

== Executive producer ==
=== Movies ===
- If Someone Had Known (TV) – 1995
- A Mother's Right: The Elizabeth Morgan Story (TV) – 1992
- Unspeakable Acts (TV) – 1992

== Associate producer ==
=== Movies ===
- A Place at the Table (TV) – 1988
