= Alan Landsburg Productions =

American television production company

- Alan Landsburg Productions logo used from 1975 to 1979
- Type: Subsidiary
- Industry: Television
- Founded: 1971; 55 years ago
- Founder: Alan Landsburg
- Defunct: 1994
- Fate: Folded into Thames Television
- Products: Television production; Film production
- Parent: Tomorrow Entertainment (1971–1974); Reeves Communications Corp. (1978–1990); Thames Television (1990–1994)

Alan Landsburg Productions (ALP), later known as Reeves Entertainment Group and Reeves Entertainment, was an independent television production company founded by Alan Landsburg in 1971. The company produced In Search of... and That's Incredible!. The company also found success in television movies (the Emmy-winning Mickey Rooney film Bill), and scripted shows (the sitcoms Gimme a Break! and Kate & Allie). They made a few theatrical movies as well, most notably Jaws 3-D (1983).

The company was acquired in 1978 by Reeves Communications Corp. In 1984, Landsburg left the company and formed The Landsburg Company, in partnership with Cox Enterprises, and ALP was renamed the Reeves Entertainment Group. David Auberbach, a friend of Landsburg served as vice president, received a new deal at the studio. Barris Industries originally owned a 5.27% stake in Reeves, with backing from Burt Sugarman. In 1987, the company had signed a partnership with independent television producer Blue Andre to an exclusive first-look agreement, to develop projects like The Warriors, which was based on a 1985 Pulitzer Prize play winner by William Broad, which was sold to CBS as a two-hour made-for-television movie, and The Secret of Sherwood Forest, which was also done for CBS.

It was purchased by Thames Television in 1990 for $89 million. After Thames lost their ITV franchise in 1991, followed by the acquisition of Thames by Pearson plc, MCEG Sterling Administrations was given control of Reeves' assets (as a sale or transfer of the Reeves holdings was a condition of Thames' sale to Pearson). A potential deal with New World Entertainment fell apart at the last minute, though ultimately a deal with NBC was worked out, enabling the network to continue production of Reeves' critically-acclaimed Homicide: Life on the Street. Most of the studio's catalogue is now owned by Fremantle, which acquired Thames in 2000. Distribution rights in the United States vary on an individual basis.

== Filmography ==
=== Alan Landsburg Productions ===
- In Search of... (1976–1982)
- The Kids From C.A.P.E.R. (1976–1977)
- Highcliffe Manor (1979)
- Mysterious Island of Beautiful Women (1979)
- That's Incredible! (1980–1984)
- Those Amazing Animals (1980–1981)
- The Jayne Mansfield Story (1980 TV movie)
- The Krypton Factor (1981 TV game show) (in association with MCA Television Enterprises)
- Bill (1981 TV movie)
- Gimme a Break! (1981–1985) (Reeves Entertainment 1985–1987; now distributed by Universal Television)
- Adam (1983 TV movie) and its sequel Adam: His Song Continues (1986)
- Baby Makes Five (1983)
- The Pop 'N Rocker Game (1983–1984 TV game show)
- Kennedy (1983 TV miniseries)
- Kate & Allie (1984–1989) (Reeves Entertainment 1985–1989; now distributed by Universal Television)
- Jaws 3-D (1983 film; co-production with and distributed by Universal Pictures)

=== Reeves Entertainment ===
- I Married Dora (1987–1988)
- The Home Show (1988–1994)
- Doctor Doctor (1989–1991; now distributed by Sony Pictures Television)
- Jackpot! (1989–1990; produced by Bob Stewart-Sande Stewart Productions now owned by Sony Pictures Television)
- Wild & Crazy Kids (1990–1992; co-produced by Woody Fraser Productions and Nickelodeon Productions)
- What Would You Do? (1991–1993)
- The Tomorrow People (1992–1995)
- Homicide: Life on the Street (1993–1999; first season only)

== See also ==
- Reeves Teletape Studios
