= Alan Landsburg =

American television writer

- Born: Alan William Landsburg; May 10, 1933; White Plains, New York, U.S.
- Died: August 13, 2014 (aged 81); Beverly Hills, California, U.S.
- Occupations: Television producer, writer, director
- Spouse(s): Sally Landsburg (divorced) Linda Otto (died 2004)
- Children: 3, including Valerie

Logo of Alan Landsburg Productions

Alan William Landsburg (May 10, 1933 – August 13, 2014) was an American television writer, producer, and director. He was the founder and CEO of Alan Landsburg Productions and the Landsburg Company and was involved in producing over fifty movies of the week. He had over 2,000 hours of television production experience.

== Biography ==
=== Early life ===
Alan William Landsburg was born on May 10, 1933, in White Plains, New York. His father was Harry Landsburg and his mother, Fannie (Koslowe) Landsburg. He graduated from New York University with a degree in communications. He was immediately drafted due to the Korean War and was assigned to the Army Radio Network as a writer-director.

=== Career ===
Drawing upon his experience at the Army Radio Network, he embarked upon a career in writing and directing television programs in Manhattan, later relocating to California in the 1960s. From the early-1960s to the mid-1970s, he established himself as a documentary producer. His film, Kennedy, The First Thousand Days received a standing ovation at the 1964 Democratic National Convention. Along with David L. Wolper, he pioneered the television documentary series format. His credits include:

- Biography – wrote, directed, and/or produced 65 episodes hosted by Mike Wallace.
- National Geographic Specials
- The World of Jacques Cousteau — Landsburg executive produced the first season of this landmark aquatic exploration documentary program that was later renamed The Undersea World of Jacques Cousteau
- Alaska Wilderness Lake — A 1971 documentary that was nominated for an Academy Award.
- In Search of... — Launched in 1976, the series explored the paranormal and was hosted by Leonard Nimoy.

In 1980, he created one of the first reality shows, That's Incredible!.

He was also a prolific executive producer of made-for-television movies, many of which were based on true stories and tackled important social issues. Of note are:

- Bill -- Mickey Rooney won an Emmy and a Golden Globe Award for his portrayal of Bill Sackter, who was institutionalized from the age of seven and struggles to re-integrate into society when he is released almost 45 years later.
- Adam — Recounted the story of Adam Walsh, who was abducted from a Florida shopping center. The film brought attention to how kidnapped children were poorly tracked by federal government agencies. It prompted the formation of the National Center for Missing and Exploited Children, and led to the passage of the Adam Walsh Child Protection and Safety Act in July 2006. Because of his outspoken advocacy on behalf of missing and exploited children, Adam's father, John Walsh, has become a public figure, and is now perhaps best known as host of the Fox television show America's Most Wanted.
- The Ryan White Story — Highlighted the discrimination faced by a young hemophiliac who contracted AIDS from a blood transfusion and promoted tolerance for children afflicted by AIDS.
- A Mother's Right: The Elizabeth Morgan Story — focused on the lengths a mother would go to in order to protect her daughter, who she believed was sexually abused by her ex-husband.

His late wife, Linda Otto, produced and/or directed many of these socially relevant docudramas.

In 1970, he founded his own production company, Alan Landsburg Productions, which later merged into the Reeves Entertainment Group. The situation comedies Gimme a Break! and Kate & Allie were produced under these companies' banners. In 1985, he formed The Landsburg Company, in partnership with Cox Enterprises. The Landsburg Company subsequently signed a deal with David Auerbach, former vice president and secretary of the ALP studio.

=== Books ===
- 1974 In Search of Ancient Mysteries
- 1975 The Outer Space Connection
- 1976 In Search of Lost Civilizations ("In Search of Lost Civilisations" in the UK)
- 1976 In Search of Extraterrestrials
- 1977 In Search of Magic and Witchcraft
- 1977 In Search of Myths and Monsters
- 1977 In Search of Strange Phenomena
- 1978 In Search of Missing Persons
- 1978 Secrets of the Bermuda Triangle
- 1978 The Insects Are Coming
- 1978 Between the Wars
- 1978 In Search of Lost Civilizations, Extraterrestrials, Magic and Witchcraft, Strange Phenomena, Myths and Monsters (a "Best Of" compilation hardcover)
- 1979 Death Encounters (with Charles Fiore)

=== Horse racing ===
He retired from the television business in 2001 and pursued his love of horse racing full-time. He owned, raced, and bred more than four hundred thoroughbreds from 1976 to 2014.

A founding director of the Thoroughbred Owners of California, he was the co-author of Handbook for Thoroughbred Owners of California. In 2002, he served as a commissioner and chairman of the California Horse Racing Board. He also served on the board of directors of the National Thoroughbred Racing Association.

=== Personal life ===
He married Sally (Breit) Landsburg. They had three children: Valerie Landsburg, Shana Landsburg, Michael Landsburg. They divorced.

He later remarried to Linda Otto, a producer of docudramas who died in 2004. They resided in Beverly Hills, California.

=== Death ===
He died from natural causes at his house in Beverly Hills, California on 13 August 2014 at the age of 81.
