= Franchise Pictures =

American motion picture production and distribution company

Franchise Pictures LLC
- Industry: Independent film studio
- Founded: 1997
- Founder: Elie Samaha; Andrew Stevens; Ashok Amritraj
- Defunct: 2006
- Fate: Chapter 11 bankruptcy Liquidation
- Successor: Studio: Intertainment AG Möbius International Luminosity Entertainment LLC; Library: Morgan Creek Entertainment Revolution Studios Orange Holdings LLC
- Headquarters: Los Angeles, California, United States
- Key people: Elie Samaha; Andrew Stevens
- Subsidiaries: Franchise Interactive; Phoenician Entertainment; Franchise Pictures Classics

Franchise Pictures, LLC was an American independent motion picture studio, production and distribution company based in Los Angeles, California, founded in 1997 by Elie Samaha, Ashok Amritraj, and Andrew Stevens. They were known for their production in the action film genre, and for producing passion projects by actors which major studios passed on. The company also had a short-lived video game arm, Franchise Interactive.

In 2004, in a case heard before a jury in a Los Angeles federal courtroom, Intertainment Licensing GmbH v. Franchise Pictures, et al., Judge Stotler awarded a plaintiff's verdict for $121.7 million against Franchise Pictures and Elie Samaha for fraudulent accounting. Samaha vowed to appeal but the fraud judgment destroyed Franchise's viability; the company and its subsidiaries all filed Chapter 11 bankruptcy petitions on August 18, 2004.

As of 2021, half of the Franchise Pictures library, along with that of ThinkFilm, is now owned by Orange Holdings LLC. Another half of the Franchise Pictures library is owned by Revolution Studios (via Morgan Creek Entertainment).

== History ==
Franchise Pictures was started in October 1997, with Phoenician Entertainment serving as subsidiary for lower-budget films. Its initial employees were Elie Samaha and Ashok Amritraj, who would leave two years later to start Hyde Park Entertainment.

On October 8, 1998, they signed a distribution agreement with Morgan Creek Productions and Warner Bros. Pictures, in which Franchise paid the distribution rights to both Morgan Creek and Warner Bros. for North America and the United Kingdom, while 20th Century Fox handling the distribution rights in select territories for three films. Summit Entertainment would also handle the international sales of their films. On May 19, 1999, the company had signed a deal with Intertainment in order to bring all 60 motion pictures that Franchise had been receiving to Germany. A month later, Intertainment had struck a distribution deal with Warner Bros. Pictures, in order to secure the rights to 60 motion pictures for worldwide distribution. The company's first film, A Murder of Crows, began shooting in December 1997, and it was released in the United States in July 1999, with the British release occurring in December 1998. In December 1997, Franchise also started shooting If... Dog... Rabbit..., which was directed by actor Matthew Modine. However, this film didn't receive a wide release in the United States until 2002, when it was released on home video.

On July 2, 2001, Morgan Creek and its CEO James G. Robinson sued Franchise Pictures for breach of contract, resulting in Morgan Creek ending their partnership with Franchise Pictures after the release of Heist (2001).

During Franchise's partnership with Morgan Creek, by 2000, the companies had financial success with the film The Whole Nine Yards. However, they also suffered a huge flop with Battlefield Earth starring John Travolta, which received bad word-of-mouth and grossed $29.7 million on a $75 million budget.

== Bankruptcy ==
Following the failure of Battlefield Earth and other films independently produced by Franchise Pictures, The Wall Street Journal reported that the FBI was probing "the question of whether some independent motion picture companies have vastly inflated the budget of films in an effort to scam investors". In December 2000, the German-based Intertainment AG [de] filed a lawsuit alleging that Franchise Pictures had fraudulently inflated budgets in films including Battlefield Earth, which Intertainment had helped to finance. Intertainment had agreed to pay 47% of the production costs of several films in exchange for European distribution rights, but ended up paying for between 60 and 90% of the costs instead. The company alleged that Franchise had defrauded it to the tune of over $75 million by systematically submitting "grossly fraudulent and inflated budgets".

The case was heard before a jury in a Los Angeles federal courtroom in May–June 2004. The court heard testimony from Intertainment that according to Franchise's bank records the real cost of Battlefield Earth was $44 million, not the $75 million declared by Franchise. The remaining $31 million had been fraudulent padding. Intertainment's head Barry Baeres told the court that he had only funded Battlefield Earth because it was packaged as a slate that included two more commercially attractive films, the Wesley Snipes vehicle The Art of War and the Bruce Willis comedy The Whole Nine Yards. Baeres testified that "Mr. Samaha said, 'If you want the other two pictures, you have to take Battlefield Earth — it's called packaging' ... We would have been quite happy if he had killed [Battlefield Earth]".

Intertainment won the case and was awarded $121.7 million in damages. Samaha was declared by the court to be personally liable for $77 million in damages. The jury rejected Intertainment's claims under the Racketeer Influenced and Corrupt Organizations Act (RICO) statute, which would have tripled the damages if Franchise had been convicted on that charge. The judgment forced Franchise into bankruptcy on August 18, 2004. The failure of the film was reported to have led, in 2002, to Travolta firing his manager Jonathan Krane, who had set up the deal with Franchise in the first place.

== Filmography ==
Release date	Title	Notes
July 6, 1999	A Murder of Crows	First Franchise Pictures production Also distributor
September 10, 1999	Storm Catcher	Released under Phoenician Entertainment
October 9, 1999	Five Aces	Released under Phoenician Entertainment
December 29, 1999	The Third Miracle	First theatrical release Co-production with Sony Pictures Classics
January 21, 2000	The Boondock Saints	Distribution; Also co-producer 20th Century Fox handled select international distribution rights.
February 11, 2000	Mercy	Distributed by 20th Century Fox Home Entertainment
February 18, 2000	The Whole Nine Yards	Co-production with Warner Bros. and Morgan Creek Entertainment; First film under Morgan Creek pact and the first to be released by Warner Bros. Pictures. 20th Century Fox handled select international distribution rights. Directed by Jonathan Lynn.
April 28, 2000	The Big Kahuna	Co-production with Lionsgate Films
May 12, 2000	Battlefield Earth	Co-production with Warner Bros. and Morgan Creek Entertainment; Directed by Roger Christian; Winner of the Razzie Award for Worst Picture
July 4, 2000	Jill Rips	Co-production with Columbia TriStar Home Video; Also distributor
August 25, 2000	The Art of War	Co-production with Warner Bros. and Morgan Creek Entertainment; 20th Century Fox handled select international distribution rights
September 14, 2000	Auggie Rose	Distributed by 20th Century Fox Home Entertainment
October 6, 2000	Get Carter	Co-production with Warner Bros. and Morgan Creek Entertainment
October 13, 2000	Animal Factory	Co-production with Phoenician Entertainment; Directed by Steve Buscemi
January 19, 2001	The Pledge	Co-production with Warner Bros. and Morgan Creek Entertainment; Directed by Sean Penn
February 23, 2001	3000 Miles to Graceland	Co-production with Morgan Creek Entertainment; Nominee of the Razzie Award for Worst Picture
March 2, 2001	The Caveman's Valentine	Distributed by Universal Focus through Universal Pictures
March 11, 2001	Things You Can Tell Just by Looking at Her	Co-production with United Artists
April 10, 2001	Agent Red	Released under Phoenician Entertainment
April 27, 2001	Driven	Co-production with Warner Bros. Directed by Renny Harlin; Nominee of the Razzie Award for Worst Picture
May 18, 2001	Angel Eyes	Co-production with Warner Bros., Morgan Creek Entertainment and The Canton Company
June 15, 2001	Viva Las Nowhere	Co-production with Jason Bloom Productions
November 9, 2001	Heist	Co-production with Warner Bros. and Morgan Creek Entertainment; Last film under Morgan Creek pact Directed by David Mamet
May 1, 2002	Green Dragon	Co-production with Columbia Pictures; Released under Franchise Pictures Classics
May 21, 2002	Desperate But Not Serious	Released on DVD under the title Reckless + Wild; Co-production with Phoenician Entertainment
July 9, 2002	Zig Zag	Distribution only Released under Franchise Pictures Classics
August 30, 2002	FeardotCom	North American, Japanese and Thailand co-distribution with Warner Bros. Co-production with Horrorhouse Pictures; Columbia TriStar Film Distributors International handled the international distribution rights Directed by William Malone
August 30, 2002	Avenging Angelo	Co-production with Martyn Burke Productions; Distributed by Columbia TriStar Home Entertainment
September 3, 2002	If... Dog... Rabbit...	Distribution only
September 6, 2002	City by the Sea	Co-production with Warner Bros. and Brad Grey Pictures; Touchstone Pictures handled the Spanish distribution rights through Buena Vista International
September 20, 2002	Ballistic: Ecks vs. Sever	Co-production with Warner Bros. Dimension Films handled the Spanish distribution rights through Buena Vista International; Directed by Wych Kaosayananda
November 15, 2002	Half Past Dead	Co-production with Screen Gems; Directed by Don Michael Paul
November 22, 2002	The 4th Tenor	Home media co-distribution with Warner Bros. Metro-Goldwyn-Mayer handled the theatrical distribution rights
January 28, 2003	The Foreigner	Co-production with TriStar Pictures; Directed by Michael Oblowitz
May 23, 2003	The In-Laws	Co-production with Warner Bros.
June 20, 2003	Alex & Emma	Co-production with Warner Bros., Castle Rock Entertainment and Escape Artists; Directed by Rob Reiner
October 21, 2003	Final Examination	Co-production with Artisan Entertainment and Horrorhouse Pictures
March 12, 2004	Spartan	Co-production with Warner Bros. Directed by David Mamet
April 9, 2004	The Whole Ten Yards	Co-production with Warner Bros. Sequel to The Whole Nine Yards; Directed by Howard Deutch
July 20, 2004	Out of Reach	Distributed by Columbia TriStar Home Entertainment; Directed by Po-Chih Leong
September 17, 2004	Funky Monkey	Co-production with Warner Bros. and Harry Basil Productions
January 14, 2005	Retrograde	Distribution only
February 15, 2005	Into the Sun	Co-production with Destination Films
September 2, 2005	A Sound of Thunder	Co-production with Warner Bros. Last Franchise film to be released by Warner Bros.
January 13, 2006	Tristan & Isolde	Uncredited only Co-production with 20th Century Fox and Scott Free Productions; Directed by Kevin Reynolds; Final Franchise production
May 18, 2007	The Wendell Baker Story	Picked up by Möbius Entertainment; Distributed by ThinkFilm and Lionsgate Films; Directed by Andrew & Luke Wilson
February 19, 2008	Chaos	Picked up by Möbius Entertainment; Distributed by Lionsgate Films; Directed by Tony Giglio; Final Franchise Pictures release overall
