= Night Eyes =

1990 film by Jag Mundhra

- Theatrical release poster
- Directed by: Jag Mundhra
- Written by: Tom Citrano; Andrew Stevens
- Produced by: Ashok Amritraj; Andrew Stevens
- Starring: Tanya Roberts; Andrew Stevens
- Cinematography: James Mathers
- Edited by: David H. Lloyd
- Music by: Richard Glasser
- Distributed by: Armitraj Company; Baldwin Entertainment Group
- Release date: 1990
- Running time: 90 minutes
- Country: United States
- Language: English

Night Eyes is a 1990 American erotic thriller film written by Tom Citrano and Andrew Stevens and directed by Jag Mundhra. It stars Andrew Stevens, Tanya Roberts, Cooper Huckabee, and Warwick Sims. The film was followed by a series of sequels following similar plots.

== Plot summary ==
Will Griffith is the owner of a security and surveillance company in Los Angeles. Will is hired by a rock star named Brian Walker, who is undergoing a messy divorce from his philandering wife Nikki, to rig the Walkers' home with video cameras to capture Nikki cheating on him with various lovers. During this job, Will gets to know Nikki better and ultimately grows more attracted to and protective of her, eventually ending up having an affair with her.

Brian discovers their relationship, becomes jealous and breaks into the home in a fit of rage and is killed by Will in an act of self-defense. Events start to unfold and Will begins to realize that he may have been used as a decoy for something much bigger than he thought.

== Cast ==
- Andrew Stevens as Will Griffith
- Tanya Roberts as Nikki Walker
- Cooper Huckabee as Ernie
- Stephen Meadows as Michael Vincent
- Warwick Sims as Brian Walker
- Veronica Henson-Phillips as Lauretta
- Karen Elise Baldwin as Ellen
- Yvette Buchanan as Baby Doll
- Steven Burks as Tom Clemmons
- Paul Carr as Tom Michaelson
- Dena Drotar as Muffy Goldstein
- Larry Poindexter as Bard Goldstein
- Chick Vennera as Shapiro

== Production ==
Night Eyes was filmed within a month, starting on November 27, 1989, and finishing in December. It was filmed in Los Angeles, California, while a sequence was filmed in Kenya.

== Sequels ==
There was a series of sequels, all of which feature Andrew Stevens as a writer and in the role of Will Griffith. The first two (Night Eyes 2 and Night Eyes 3) feature Shannon Tweed in the lead female role, while the fourth one features Paula Barbieri.
