= Illicit Dreams =

1994 film

- Film poster
- Directed by: Andrew Stevens
- Written by: Karen Kelly
- Produced by: Ashok Amritraj
- Starring: Andrew Stevens; Shannon Tweed; Joe Cortese; Michelle Johnson; Brad Blaisdell; Stella Stevens; Rochelle Swanson; Dave Carlton; Jennifer Bassey
- Cinematography: Christian Sebaldt
- Edited by: Terry J. Chiappe
- Music by: Claude Gaudette
- Release date: 2 November 1994
- Running time: 93 min.
- Country: United States
- Language: English

Illicit Dreams is a 1994 American erotic thriller film directed by Andrew Stevens and produced by Ashok Amritraj. with music composed by Claude Gaudette. The film stars Andrew Stevens, Shannon Tweed (reuniting the two from Night Eyes 2 and 3) and also stars Joe Cortese, Michelle Johnson and Brad Blaisdell.

== Plot ==
Dr. Daniel Davis is married to Moira, both of whom have a rocky relationship; Dan has seduced several women who are his patients while treating his wife carelessly. Moira frequently dreams of visiting a large house and makes love to a man named Nick. One day, Moira sees a house that resembles the one in her dream and, to her surprise, Nick is waiting inside. Moira and Nick soon start a love affair. Daniel finds out about it, gets jealous, and intervenes, so Nick protects Moira from him.

== Cast ==
- Andrew Stevens as Nick Richardson
- Shannon Tweed as Moira Davis
- Joe Cortese as Daniel Davis
- Michelle Johnson as Melinda Ryan
- Brad Blaisdell as Reed
- Stella Stevens as Cicily
- Rochelle Swanson as Beverly Keen
- Dave Carlton as Investigaton
- Jennifer Bassey as Real Estate Woman
