= Larry Poindexter =

American actor (1959–2026)

- Born: December 16, 1959; Dallas, Texas, U.S.
- Died: November 18, 2026 (aged 66); Los Angeles, California, U.S.
- Occupation: Actor
- Years active: 1982–2026
- Spouse: Carol Kritzer (m. 2002)
- Children: 2
- Father: H. R. Poindexter

Larry Poindexter (December 16, 1959 – November 18, 2026) was an American actor and singer.

== Early life ==
Poindexter was born in Dallas, Texas, on December 16, 1959. His father, H. R. Poindexter, was a Broadway theater light and set designer. His mother, Sue Ann Erdman, was an opera singer.

== Career ==
=== Acting ===
One of Poindexter's best known roles was for the film S.W.A.T. (2003), in which he played by-the-book LAPD Captain Tom Fuller, who competed with Samuel L. Jackson's character "Hondo".

Poindexter appeared on the ABC soap opera General Hospital as Asher Thomas. He played the character from June 3, 2005, until August 8, 2005, when his character was shot and killed by Jason Morgan (Steve Burton) after he murdered A.J. Quartermaine (Billy Warlock) and Rachel Adair (Amy Grabow). The character was controversial, as his backstory was a retcon of Jason and A.J.'s history.

He played a recurring character on season 3 of JAG, Dalton Lowne, a lawyer and love interest of Major Sarah MacKenzie (Catherine Bell), who falls prey to another man obsessed with Mac. He appeared in the soap operas Santa Barbara, Days of Our Lives, and was a frequent guest on the MTV show Just Say Julie. He appeared in Quantum Leap, How I Met Your Mother, and Friends. He also appeared on Blade: The Series as FBI agent Ray Collins.

Poindexter was in Going Berserk (1983) as Claudell, Invaders from Mars (1986), American Ninja 2: The Confrontation (1987), Night Eyes (1990), The White Raven (1998), The Opposite Sex and How to Live with Them (1992), and Intrepid (2000). He was in the made-for-TV Movie Kissing Miranda (1995), Sorceress, (1995) and Body Chemistry IV: Full Exposure (1995).

Poindexter was on Hope & Gloria from 1995 to 1996 as Jeffrey and Supernatural in 2010. He was one of the producers of The Cher Show at the Neil Simon Theatre in 2018–19. From 2010 to 2011, Poindexter was on The Hard Times of RJ Berger.

=== Singing ===
Poindexter was lead singer for the alternative country band The High Lonesome in the 1990s. Their album Feel Free To Do So was released in 1995.

== Personal life and death ==
Poindexter married Carol Kritzer, a casting director, in 2002. The couple had twin sons.

Poindexter was hit by a car on November 13, 2026, while crossing a street outside his Studio City apartment. He was hospitalized, and was due to undergo surgery for his injuries when he died suddenly on November 18. Poindexter was 66.

== Filmography ==
=== Film ===
| Year | Title | Role | Director(s) | Notes |
|---|---|---|---|---|
| 1983 | Going Berserk | Claudell | David Steinberg | Comedy film |
| 1984 | Toy Soldiers | Trevor | David Andrew Fisher | Action film |
| 1986 | Invaders from Mars | Marine #3 | Tobe Hooper | Science fiction horror film |
| 1987 | Number One with a Bullet | Preppy Guy | Jack Smight | Action comedy film |
| 1987 | American Ninja 2: The Confrontation | Sergeant Charlie McDonald | Sam Firstenberg | Martial arts action film |
| 1988 | Blue Movies | Cliff | Ed Fitzgerald; Paul Koval | Comedy film |
| 1989 | Warm Summer Rain | Steve | Joe Gayton | Drama film |
| 1990 | Night Eyes | Bard Goldstein | Jag Mundhra | Erotic thriller film |
| 1992 | The Opposite Sex and How to Live with Them | Carrie's Date | Matthew Meshekoff | Romantic comedy film |
| 1995 | The Skateboard Kid 2 | Announcer (voice) | Andrew Stevens | Family Fantasy film |
| 1995 | Sorceress | Larry Barnes | Jim Wynorski | Erotic horror film Also known as Temptress II |
| 1995 | Virtual Combat | Employee | Andrew Stevens | Action Science Fiction film Direct-to-video |
| 1995 | Body Chemistry IV: Full Exposure | Simon Mitchell | Jim Wynorski | Erotic thriller film Direct-to-video |
| 1996 | Dead of Night | Keane | | |
| 1997 | Strategic Command | Jack Haynes | | |
| 1997 | Steel Sharks | Dobbins | | |
| 1997 | Time Under Fire | Cole | | |
| 1998 | The White Raven | Lieutenant Kreister | | |
| 1999 | Angels, Baby! | Hamilton | | |
| 1999 | Valerie Flake | Cliff Lambert | | |
| 1999 | Judgment Day | Jeff | | Video |
| 2000 | Intrepid | First Officer 'Lazo' Lazaro | | |
| 2000 | Coverage | Reisenkemp | | Short film |
| 2001 | Ablaze | Andrew Thomas | | |
| 2001 | Thy Neighbor's Wife | Chris Stewart | | |
| 2002 | Stranded | Nick | | Video |
| 2003 | S.W.A.T. | Captain Tom Fuller | | Feature Film |
| 2006 | Entity: Nine | Bowman | | |
| 2006 | Mojave Phone Booth | Darrell | | |
| 2006 | Material Girls | Sol | | |
| 2008 | Ninja Cheerleaders | Detective Harris | | |
| 2009 | 17 Again | Dean | | |

=== Television ===
| Year | Title | Role | Notes |
|---|---|---|---|
| 1982 | A New Day in Eden | Greg Lewis | Episode: "1.1" |
| 1983 | Journey's End | Pvt. | Made-for-TV Movie directed by Kent Gibson and Steven Schachter |
| 1983 | Thursday's Child | Malcolm | Made-for-TV Movie directed by David Lowell Rich; Based on the book of the same name by Victoria Poole. |
| 1983 | CHiPs | Mark Anthony Harlington III | Episode: "Fun House" |
| 1983 | Happy Days | Erik Sandler | Episode: "Affairs of the Heart" |
| 1983 | The Facts of Life | Ken | Episode: "I'm Dancing as Fast as I Can" |
| 1984-2018 | Days of Our Lives | Ben Welch | 8 episodes |
| 1984-2018 | Days of Our Lives | Father Louis | 22 episodes |
| 1984 | Hotel | Dan | Episode: "Outsiders" |
| 1985 | The Paper Chase | Carter | 2 episodes |
| 1985 | Crazy Like a Fox | Guest | Episode: "Fox in 3/4 Time" |
| 1985 | Silver Spoons | Matt Henderson | Episode: "A Magnificent Obsession" |
| 1986 | Growing Pains | Andre | Episode: "The Love Song of M. Aaron Seaver" |
| 1986 | The Twilight Zone | Milo Trent | Episode: "Cold Reading" |
| 1986 | Santa Barbara | Justin Moore | 23 episodes |
| 1987 | Karen's Song | Jerry | Episode: "Aloha Oe" |
| 1987 | Sledge Hammer! | Teddy Overman | Episode: "Big Nazi on Campus" |
| 1987–88 | Duet | Cooper Hayden | 22 episodes |
| 1988 | Nightingales | Todd | Made-for-TV movie directed by Mimi Leder |
| 1989 | Just Say Julie | Various Roles | Unknown episodes |
| 1989 | Quantum Leap | Captain Tony LaMott | Episodes: "Genesis: Part 1" and "Genesis: Part 2" |
| 1989 | Tour of Duty | CPT Palmer | Episode: "Sealed with a Kiss" |
| 1989 | Julie Brown: The Show | Grant | Made-for-TV movie directed by Peter Bonerz |
| 1990 | ALF | Sergeant Armstrong | Episode: "Consider Me Gone" |
| 1990 | She'll Take Romance | Mike Heller | Made-for-TV movie directed by Piers Haggard |
| 1992 | Dangerous Curves | Gordon Pierson | Episode: "In the Name of Love" |
| 1992 | Passionata | Alan Spencer | Made-for-TV movie directed by Christopher Shelton |
| 1993 | Melrose Place | Danny Baker | Episodes: "Single White Sister"; "Peanut Butter and Jealousy" |
| 1993 | Murphy Brown | Kevin | Episode: "To Market, to Market" |
| 1993 | Harry and the Hendersons | Ian Wilson | Episode: "Beauty and the Beast" |
| 1993 | Incredi-Girl | Guest | Made-for-TV movie directed by Nick Marck |
| 1994 | Sisters | Matt Kirshner | Episode: "Blood Is Thicker Than Water" |
| 1994 | Black Sheep | Alex | Pilot |
| 1994 | Ellen | Don | Episode: "So Funny" |
| 1994 | Silk Stalkings | Wayne Thornton | Episode: "Vengeance" |
| 1994 | Hot Line | Unknown | Episode: "Payback" |
| 1994 | Party of Five | George Lewis | Episode: "Good Sports" |
| 1995 | Marker | Collin Dogget | Episode: "Cloud Warriors" |
| 1995 | Friends | Fireman Dave | Episode: "The One with the Candy Hearts" |
| 1995 | Kissing Miranda | Gilbert 'Gib' Nash | Made-for-TV movie directed by Aleks Horvat |
| 1995–98 | Weird Science | Agent Scolder | Episodes: "Fly Boy" and "Night of the Swingin' Steves" |
| 1995–98 | Weird Science | Lieutenant Pommafritte | Episode: "Stalag 16"; credited as Lawrence Poindexter |
| 1995–98 | Weird Science | Doctor | Episode: "Genie Junior" |
| 1995–96 | Hope & Gloria | Jeffrey | 4 episodes |
| 1995–96 | New York Daze | Henry | 22 episodes |
| 1996 | Kirk | Guy Dunham | Episode: "The Love Letter" |
| 1996 | The Naked Truth | Doctor | Episode: "The Bubble Show" |
| 1996 | Lois & Clark: The New Adventures of Superman | Dr. Maxwell Deter | Episodes: "Forget Me Not" and "Oedipus Wrecks" |
| 1996 | The John Larroquette Show | Dr. Tim | Episode: "A Night to Remember" |
| 1996 | Party of Five | Professor Tom 'T.J.' Digman | Episode: "Mixed Signals" |
| 1996 | Pacific Blue | Jeff Weingard | Episode: "Point Blank" |
| 1997 | Spy Game | Jackson | Episode: "What, Micah Worry?" |
| 1997 | Rewind | Mike | TV series |
| 1997–98 | JAG | Dalton Lowne | 7 episodes |
| 1998 | Style & Substance | Dax Chandler | Episode: "No Soap, Romeo" |
| 1999 | Early Edition | Addison Preston | Episode: "Two to Tangle" |
| 1999 | Zoe, Duncan, Jack and Jane | Colin | Episode: "Run, Man Ray, Run" |
| 1999 | Introducing Dorothy Dandridge | Joey Young | Made-for-TV movie |
| 1999 | Becker | Jordan Brewster | Episode: "My Boyfriend's Back" |
| 1999 | Snoops | Kevin | Episode: "The Heartless Bitch" |
| 2000 | The Sullivan Sisters | Heath | TV series |
| 2000 | Popular | Harold Bean | Episode: "Ch-Ch-Changes" |
| 2000 | Chicken Soup for the Soul | Walter Vanderbilt | Episode: "Destiny in a Bottle" |
| 2000 | V.I.P. | Oliver King | Episode: "Loh-Down Dirty Shame" |
| 2001 | Sabrina, the Teenage Witch | Elliot | Episode: "Do You See What I See?" |
| 2001 | Family Law | Assistant Attorney General Kamins | Episode: "Clemency" |
| 2001 | FreakyLinks | Dex Crawford | Episode: "Subject: The Final Word" |
| 2001 | The Tick | Man | Episode: "The License" |
| 2002 | The Agency | Dr. Higgins | Episode: "The Enemy Within" |
| 2002 | Fireheart | Harvey Ward | Television movie |
| 2002 | Roswell | Colonel Griffin | Episode: "Crash" |
| 2002 | Push, Nevada | Well Dressed Man #3 | 5 episodes |
| 2003 | The Division | Chris Conklin | Episodes: "Diagnosis" and "Acts of Betrayal" |
| 2004 | Nip/Tuck | Mr. Kintner | Episode: "Joel Gideon" |
| 2004 | CSI: Crime Scene Investigation | Fire Investigator Jack Clarke | Episode: "Bad Words" |
| 2004 | Judging Amy | Attorney George Canton | Episode: "Legacy" |
| 2004 | Will & Grace | Dan Fallon | Episode: "The Newlydreads" |
| 2004 | NYPD Blue | Barrett Gooden | Episodes: "My Dinner with Andy" and "I Like Ike" |
| 2005 | General Hospital | Dr. Asher Thomas | 12 episodes |
| 2005 | Bones | Senator Bethlehem | Episode: "Pilot" |
| 2005 | CSI: NY | Dr. Stanley Thatcher | Episode: "Grand Murder at Central Station" |
| 2006 | Las Vegas | Mr. Burke | Episode: "The Bitch Is Back" |
| 2006 | Jake in Progress | Roger | Episode: "PB & J" |
| 2006 | Crossing Jordan | Mr. O'Riley | Episode: "Mysterious Ways" |
| 2006 | Standoff | Congressman Carl Cunningham | Episode: "Pilot" |
| 2006 | Blade: The Series | Agent Ray Collins | 8 episodes |
| 2007 | Eyes | Daniel Weiss | Episode: "Karma" |
| 2007 | Life | Warren Gibney | Episode: "Pilot: Merit Badge" |
| 2007 | Big Shots | Nick Dawkins | Episode: "Greatest Amerimart Hero" |
| 2007 | Weeds | Fireman | Episode: "Go" |
| 2007 | Without a Trace | Richard Ludlow | Episode: "One Wrong Move" |
| 2008 | Valentine | Jerry | Episode: "Act Naturally" |
| 2008 | CSI: Miami | Leonard McBride | Episode: "Bombshell" |
| 2008–10 | Notes from the Underbelly | Doctor | Episodes: "The List" & "Baby on Board" |
| 2008–10 | Tracey Ullman's State of the Union | Pilot / Frank, The Pilot / Mitch | Episodes: "1.1", "1.3", "2.2" & "3.2" |
| 2009 | Jack and Janet Save the Planet | Robert | Made-for-TV movie |
| 2010 | How I Met Your Mother | Joe Donovan | Episode: "Perfect Week" |
| 2010 | Supernatural | Pastor David Gideon | Episode: "99 Problems" |
| 2010 | Miami Medical | Henry | Episode: "What Lies Beneath" |
| 2010–11 | The Hard Times of RJ Berger | Rick Berger | 20 episodes |
| 2011 | Californication | Prosecutor | Episode: "The Trial"; Episode: "...And Justice for All" |
| 2011 | Rizzoli & Isles | Dr. Byron Sluckey | Episode: "We Don't Need Another Hero" |
| 2011 | Drop Dead Diva | Dr. Preminger | Episode: "You Bet Your Life" |
| 2011–12 | CSI: Crime Scene Investigation | District Attorney Claude Melvoy | Episodes: "Targets of Obsession" & Episode: "Altered Stakes" |
| 2012 | Imaginary Friend | Duane | TV movie |
| 2012 | Franklin & Bash | Carter Dunlap | Episode: "650 to SLC" |
| 2012 | Supermoms | Unknown | TV series |
| 2013 | Hawaii Five-0 | Lee Benner | Episode: "Kupu'eu" |
| 2014 | Castle | Detective McBride | Episode: "Bad Santa" |
| 2014 | Scandal | Mr. Morgan | Episode: "Like Father, Like Daughter" |
| 2016 | Bunk'd | Gerald | Episode: "Xander Says Goodbye" |
| 2016 | Major Crimes | Amanda's Father | Episode: "Present Tense" |
| 2016 | Secrets and Lies | Mark Peterson | Episode: "The Parent" |
| 2017 | Outcast | Peter | 2 episodes |
| 2017 | K.C. Undercover | Foreman | Episode: "Under Construction" |
| 2017 | Ten Days in the Valley | Male Officer | Episode: "Day 7: Breaking the Story" |
| 2018 | Heathers | Mr. Kelly | Episode: "I'm a No-Rust-Build-Up Nan Myself" |
| 2019 | S.W.A.T. | Sergeant Boyer | Episode: "Day of Dread" |
| 2019 | NCIS | Dr. Berman | Episode: "Daughters" |
| 2020 | Curb Your Enthusiasm | Pilot (AKA "Captain") | Episode: "You're Not Going to Get Me to Say Anything Bad About Mickey" |
