= Ashok Amritraj =

Indian film producer

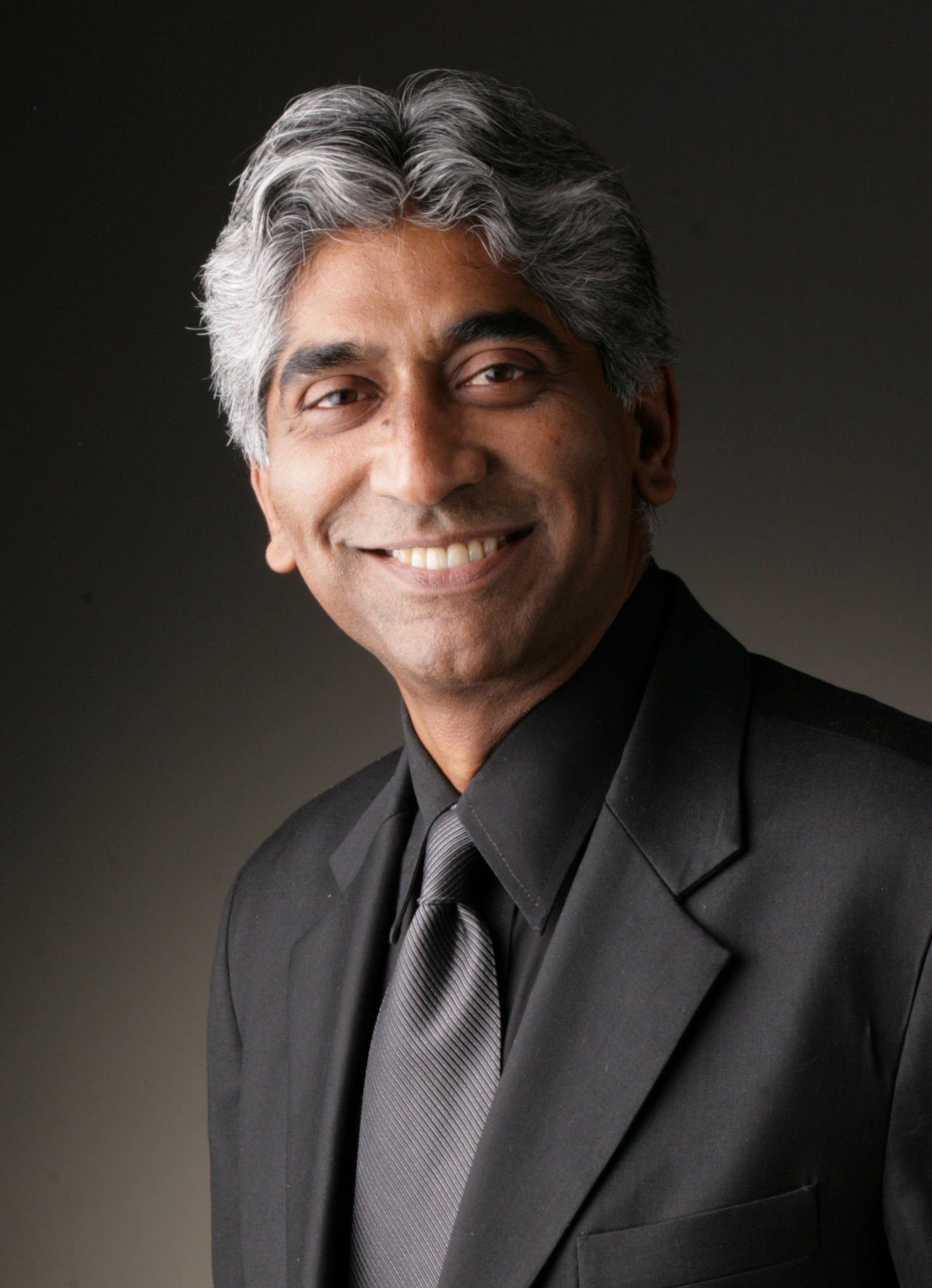
- Amritraj in March 2008
- Born: 22 February 1956 (age 70); Madras, Tamil Nadu, India (now Chennai, Tamil Nadu)
- Occupations: Film producer, former professional tennis player
- Years active: 1980s–present
- Organization: Hyde Park Entertainment Group
- Title: Chairman and CEO

Ashok Amritraj (born 22 February 1956) is an Indian-American athlete and film producer. He is chairman and CEO of the Hyde Park Entertainment Group and was formerly CEO of National Geographic Films. He played tennis professionally in his youth, one of the Indians in the top levels of the sport.

== Career ==
Ashok Amritraj and his elder brothers, Anand and Vijay, were among the first Indians to play in top-flight international tour tennis.

In 1999, Amritraj partnered with film producer David Hoberman to start a film financing and production company Hyde Park Entertainment. Hoberman left in 2002 to re-form Mandeville Films and Amritraj ran Hyde Park alone.

Amritraj has produced over 100 films during his 35-year career with collective worldwide revenues in excess of US$2 billion. He partnered with multiple Hollywood studios and produced films starring Robert De Niro, Antonio Banderas, and Jennifer Aniston. Amritraj has made notable films such as Ghost Rider: Spirit of Vengeance, starring Nicolas Cage, Bringing Down the House, starring Steve Martin, Premonition, starring Sandra Bullock, and Walking Tall starring Dwayne "The Rock" Johnson.

In 2015, Amritraj was given an honorary Doctorate of the Arts from the University of East London. In 2016, he was appointed as the first United Nations India Goodwill Ambassador for the 17 UN Sustainable Development Goals. In December 2018, by decree of the President of the Republic of France, Amritraj was appointed a Chevalier of the Ordre National du Merité.

In 2022, Hyde Park and Warner Music Entertainment launched the Hyde Park Entertainment and Warner Music Entertainment Asian Women Fellowship, in partnership with Film Independent, which will showcase women-identifying writers and writer-directors who are Asian or part of the Asian Diaspora. Amritraj serves on the Producer's A2025 committee to advance inclusion & equitable opportunities at the Academy of Motion Pictures & Arts, and on the advisory board for the Dodge Film School at Chapman University.

As of 2021, Amritraj's projects included a biopic about Arthur Ashe with Warner Music Group; The Man Who Lived Underground, in partnership with Kenya Barris' Khalabo Ink Society and Paramount Pictures; Amnesty for Netflix; Rubik's Cube, based on the toy with Endeavor Content; Remote Control with STX Films; and the remake of the Blake Edwards' film 10 with Warner Bros. Pictures.

== Filmography ==
=== As producer ===
Year	Film	Notes
1985	Nine Deaths of the Ninja	
1985	School Spirit	
1988	Bloodstone	
1989	Eyewitness to Murder	
1990	Night Eyes	
1990	Schweitzer	
1991	Popcorn	
1991	Double Impact	
1991	Legal Tender	
1991	Night Eyes 2	
1992	Invasion of Privacy	
1992	Illicit Behavior	
1993	Betrayal of the Dove	
1993	Tropical Heat	
1993	Night Eyes 3	
1993	Snapdragon	
1994	Illicit Dreams	
1995	Virtual Combat	
1996	Night Hunter	
1996	Crash Dive	
1996	Alone in the Woods	
1997	Strategic Command	
1997	Inferno	
1997	The Shooter	
1997	Time Under Fire	
1997	Steel Sharks	
1998	Scorpio One	
1998	Invisible Dad	
1998	Surface to Air	
1998	Freedom Strike	
1998	Counter Measures	
1998	Jeans	
1998	Evasive Action	
1998	Black Thunder	
1998	The Last Siege: Never Surrender	
1998	A Murder of Crows	
1998	The White Raven	
1998	The Boy Who Saved Christmas	
1998	Dear Santa	
1998	Billy Frankenstein	
1999	Tycus	
1999	Prophet	
1999	Fallout	
1999	Angel in Training	
1999	Restraining Order	
1999	Invisible Mom II	
1999	If... Dog... Rabbit...	
2000	The Elf Who Didn't Believe	
2001	What's the Worst That Could Happen?	
2001	Bandits	
2003	Bringing Down the House	
2004	Walking Tall	
2004	Raising Helen	
2005	Shopgirl	
2007	Premonition	
2007	Death Sentence	
2008	Asylum	
2008	The Other End of the Line	
2009	Street Fighter: The Legend of Chun-Li	
2009	Dark Country	
2010	Leonie	
2011	The Double	
2011	Ghost Rider: Spirit of Vengeance	
2013	Life of Crime	
2014	99 Homes	
2015	Careful What You Wish For	
2017	Killing Hasselhoff	
2019	Deadcon	
2019	Prey	
2019	The Global Citizen Concert Film: Louder Together	
2021	It Takes Three	
2023	Arthur Ashe	
2023	The Man Who Lived Underground	
2023	Bury The Lede	
2023	The Light We Lost	
2023	Marianne	
2023	Proxy	

==== As executive producer ====
Year	Film	Notes
1984	Fleshburn	
1986	Smart Alec	
1989	The Jigsaw Murders	
1991	Last Call	
1993	Scorned	
1994	Last Resort	
1994	Red Sun Rising	
1994	The Killing Machine	
1995	Victim of Desire	
1995	Street Law	
1995	The Donor	
1995	No Exit	
1996	Invisible Mom	
1996	Electra	
1996	Virus	
1997	Inner Action	
1997	Scorned 2	
1998	Jungle Boy	Also story writer
1999	The Confession	
1999	Fugitive Mind	
1999	Entropy	
1999	Five Aces	
1999	The Boondock Saints	
1999	Storm Catcher	
1999	The Third Miracle	
1999	The White River Kid	
2000	Mercy	
2000	Battlefield Earth	
2000	Get Carter	
2001	Antitrust	
2001	Original Sin	
2002	Moonlight Mile	
2005	Dreamer	
2007	Trade	
2007	Battle in Seattle	
2007	Trick 'r Treat	
2008	Traitor	
2009	The City of Your Final Destination	
2010	Machete	
2010	Dylan Dog: Dead of Night	
2014	Every Secret Thing	
2014	The Journey Home	
2016	The Young Messiah	
2016	Term Life	
2017	Louder Together	
2023	Wedding Season	

=== As actor ===
Year	Title	Role	Notes
1991	Night Eyes 2	Bar Patron	
1995	Victim of Desire	LAPD Officer	
1995	Virtual Combat	Guard Norton	
1996	Midnight Heat	Bystander	
1996	Crash Dive	Sailor	
1997	Scorned 2	Policeman	

=== Television ===
Year	Title	Credit	Notes
1992	Sexual Response		Telefilm
1996	Blackout		Telefilm
1996	Night Eyes 4: Fatal Passion	executive producer	Telefilm
1997	My Ghost Dog		Telefilm
2011	Lost Christmas	executive producer	Telefilm
