= The Night of the Iguana =

Stage play by Tennessee Williams

The Night of the Iguana is a stage play written by American author Tennessee Williams. It is based on his 1948 short story. In 1959, Williams staged it as a one-act play, and over the next two years he developed it into a full-length play, producing two different versions in 1959 and 1960, and then arriving at the three-act version that premiered on Broadway in 1961. Two film adaptations have been made: The Oscar-winning 1964 film directed by John Huston and starring Richard Burton, Ava Gardner, and Deborah Kerr, and a 2000 Croatian production.

== Description ==
The Reverend T. Lawrence Shannon characterizes the Western image of God as a "senile delinquent" during a sermon and is locked out of his church. Shannon is not defrocked, but he is institutionalized for a "nervous breakdown". In 1940s Mexico, some time after his release, the Rev. Shannon is working as a tour guide for a second-rate travel agency. Shortly before the opening of the play, Shannon is accused of committing statutory rape of a 16-year-old girl, Charlotte Goodall, who is among his current group of tourists.

As the curtain rises, Shannon and a group of women arrive at a cheap hotel on the coast of Mexico managed by his friends Fred and Maxine Faulk. Fred has recently died, and Maxine has assumed sole responsibility for managing the establishment.

Struggling emotionally, Shannon tries to manage his tour party, who have turned against him for having sexual relations with the minor, and Maxine is interested in him for purely carnal reasons. Adding to this chaotic scenario, spinster Hannah Jelkes appears with her elderly grandfather, Nonno, who, despite his failing health, is composing his last poem. Jelkes, who scrapes by as a traveling painter and sketch artist, is soon at Maxine's mercy. Shannon, who wields considerable influence over Maxine, offers Hannah shelter for the night. The play's main axis is the development of the deeply human bond between Hannah and Shannon.

Minor characters in the play include a group of German tourists whose Nazi marching songs paradoxically lighten the heavier themes of the play while suggesting the horrors of World War II; the Mexican "boys" Maxine employs to help run the hotel who ignore her laconic commands; and Judith Fellowes, the "butch" vocal teacher charged with Charlotte's care during the trip.

The Reverend T. Lawrence Shannon was based partly on Williams' cousin and close friend, the Reverend Sidney Lanier, the iconoclastic rector of St. Clement's Episcopal Church, New York. Lanier was a significant figure in the New York theater scene in the 1950s and 1960s, started a Ministry to the Theatre Arts, and became co-founder of the experimental American Place Theatre in 1962. Lanier resigned from his ministry in May 1965.

== Original Broadway production ==
The play premiered on Broadway at the Royale Theatre on December 28, 1961, and ran for 316 performances. It starred Patrick O'Neal as Rev. Shannon, two-time Oscar winner Bette Davis as Maxine, and Margaret Leighton as Hannah. Davis left the production after four months and was replaced by Shelley Winters.

Maxine, Davis's role, is a lusty life-force of a woman, with some good comic lines, who is offstage for a significant part of the play, while Hannah is on. The play featured Louis Guss, Bruce Glover, James Farentino, and Alan Webb as the dying grandfather to whom Hannah is devoted. The production was directed by Frank Corsaro. (In her memoir, Dark Victory, Davis wrote that she banned Corsaro from rehearsals shortly before opening). The play was nominated for a Tony Award for Best Play. Leighton, as Hannah, won the Tony Award for Best Actress in a Play.

Christopher Jones, who later went to Hollywood, had a small part. Shelley Winters introduced him to Susan Strasberg; they later married.

== Film versions ==
John Huston directed the 1964 film and co-wrote the screenplay with Anthony Veiller. It stars Richard Burton as Rev. Shannon, Ava Gardner as Maxine and Deborah Kerr as Hannah. The cast includes Sue Lyon, Cyril Delevanti, Grayson Hall (who received an Academy Award nomination for Best Supporting Actress for her performance as Miss Fellowes) and Barbara Joyce (who later became an artist).

The film won the Academy Award for Best Costume Design (B&W), and was nominated for Art Direction and for Cinematography (by Gabriel Figueroa), as well as for Hall's performance.

The film eliminates the Nazi tourists and the character of Jake Latta, and Shannon is fired through a comical telephone call.

A Croatian film adaptation, directed by Janusz Kica, was released in 2000.

== 1975 -1976 revival (LA and Broadway) ==
Joseph Hardy directed a revival which ran December 19, 1975 to January 31, 1976 at the Ahmanson Theatre in Los Angeles. The cast was headlined by Richard Chamberlain (Reverend Shannon), Eleanor Parker (Maxine Faulk), Dorothy McGuire (Hannah Jelkes), Raymond Massey (Jonathan "Nonno" Coffin), and Allyn Ann McLerie (Miss Judith Fellowes): featured cast members were Susan Lanier (Charlotte Goodall), Jennifer Savidge (Hilda), Norma Connolly (Frau Fahrenkopf), Michael Ross Verona (Herr Fahrenkopf), Benjamin Stewart (Jake Latta), Ben Van Vacter (Wolfgang), Matt Bennett (Hank), José Martin (Pedro), and Ricardo Landeros (Pancho).

The production encored at the Circle in the Square Theatre on Broadway with a limited December 16, 1976 to February 20, 1977 run, with three recastings among the headliners: Sylvia Miles (Maxine), William Roerick (Nonno), and Barbara Caruso (Miss Fellowes). Along with Savidge, Stewart, Van Vacter and Bennett reprising their LA roles, the supporting cast consisted of Allison Argo (Charlotte Goodall), Gary Tacon (Pedro), William Paulson (Pancho), John Rose (Herr Fahrenkopf), and Amelia Laurenson (Frau Fahrenkopf). The Broadway production featured scenery and lighting by H.R. Poindexter, and costumes by Noel Taylor, with Randall Brooks as production stage manager and James Bernadi as stage manager.

== Other stage productions ==
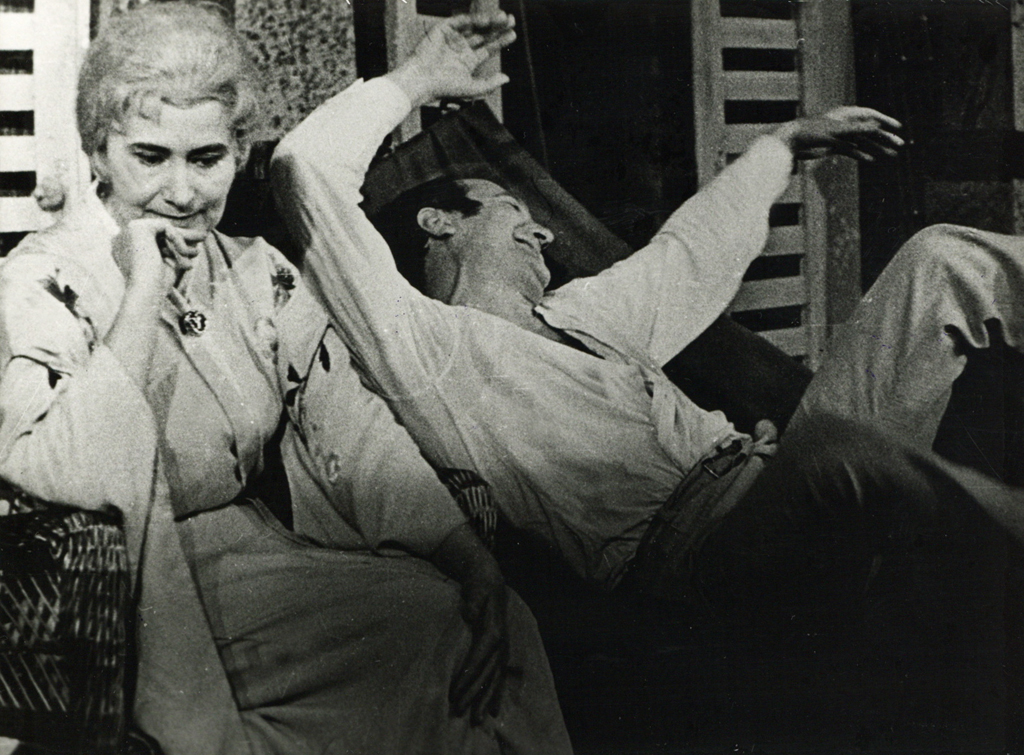
The play by the Maribor Slovene National Theatre in 1969

- The Circle in the Square Theatre staged a 1988 revival starring Nicolas Surovy as Rev. Shannon, Jane Alexander as Maxine and Maria Tucci as Hannah.
- In 1996, a Broadway revival directed by Robert Falls, featured William Petersen as Rev. Shannon, Marsha Mason as Maxine and Cherry Jones as Hannah. This was based on a 1994 production staged by the Goodman Theatre in Chicago.
- In London, a 1992 production at the Royal National Theatre featured performances by Alfred Molina as Rev. Shannon and Eileen Atkins as Hannah. This production was directed by Richard Eyre.
- A critically acclaimed 2005 London production at Lyric Theatre starred Woody Harrelson as Rev. Shannon, Clare Higgins as Maxine, and Jenny Seagrove as Hannah. This production was directed by Anthony Page.
- In 2017, the American Repertory Theater production included James Earl Jones as Nonno, Amanda Plummer as Hannah, Dana Delany as Maxine, Elizabeth Ashley as Judith, and Bill Heck as Rev. Shannon.
- In 2019, the Noël Coward Theatre at London's West End showed a limited time production by James Macdonald, starring Clive Owen as Rev. Shannon, Anna Gunn as Maxine, Lia Williams as Hannah, Julian Glover as Nonno and Finty Williams as Miss Fellowes.
- In 2023, the Pershing Square Signature Center showed a production by La Femme Theatre Productions, directed by Emily Mann, and starring Austin Pendleton as Nonno, Daphne Rubin-Vega as Maxine, Jean Lichty as Hannah, Lea DeLaria as Judith and Tim Daly as Rev. Shannon.

== In popular culture ==
- "Night of the Iguana" is a song by Joni Mitchell from her 2007 album Shine. It is a thematic and lyrical adaptation of the Tennessee Williams play.
- In the animated series King of the Hill, Season 11 Episode 3, "Blood and Sauce", minor character Gilbert Dauterieve, modeled after Tennessee Williams, states "I think it was Lucretius who said, 'Nothing human disgusts me'." This is based on the line "Nothing human disgusts me unless it's unkind, violent," spoken by Hannah Jelkes. Williams may have drawn inspiration from Terence's quote "Homo sum, humani nihil a me alienum puto" when writing this line, but no direct attribution has been confirmed.

== Awards and nominations ==
=== Original Broadway production ===
Year	Award	Category	Nominee	Result
1962	Tony Award	Best Play		Nominated
1962	Tony Award	Best Actress in a Play	Margaret Leighton	Won
1962	Tony Award	Best Producer	Charles Bowden and Viola Rubber	Nominated

=== 1976 Broadway revival ===
Year	Award	Category	Nominee	Result
1977	Drama Desk Award	Outstanding Actor in a Play	Richard Chamberlain	Nominated
1977	Drama Desk Award	Outstanding Actress in a Play	Dorothy McGuire	Nominated
