= Elie Samaha =

American film producer

- Born: Zahlé, Beqaa Governorate, Lebanon
- Occupation: Film producer
- Years active: 1995–present
- Known for: Co-founding and Chairman and CEO of Franchise Pictures; Co-founding and Chairman of Luminosity Entertainment
- Spouses: Diane Shammas (m. 1980; div. 1988) Tia Carrere (m. 1992; div. 2000)

Elie Samaha (Arabic: إيلي سماحة) is a Lebanese-American film producer. He was the co-founder, chairman, and CEO of Franchise Pictures, and was also the co-founder and chairman of Luminosity Pictures.

Samaha built his reputation in Hollywood first as the owner of Celebrity Cleaners and then with his nightclub on Sunset Strip, the Roxbury. Parlaying the Hollywood friendships he formed through his clubs, Samaha was given a distribution deal with Warner Bros. Pictures in 1998.

Samaha has produced over 83 works since 1995, primarily films along with some video games. He produced The Boondock Saints (1999), Battlefield Earth (2000), Driven (2001), 3000 Miles to Graceland (2001), Heist (2001), The Pledge (2001), Spartan (2004), Back on the Strip (2023), among many others.

== Career ==
Samaha was a co-owner/founder of the dry cleaner chain Celebrity Cleaners and co-owner of the Roxbury nightclub in Los Angeles.

Between 1997 and 2004, Samaha produced films under the Franchise Pictures studio title, which included films such as The Boondock Saints, Mercy, Battlefield Earth, The Whole Nine Yards, Get Carter, Angel Eyes and Driven.

Samaha specialized in rescuing stars' pet projects. Franchise Pictures sought out stars whose projects were stalled at the major studios, bringing them aboard at reduced salaries. Samaha's approach was to produce star vehicles more cheaply than the larger studios. His unorthodox deals raised eyebrows and the entertainment industry magazine Variety commented that they were "often so complex and variable as to leave outsiders scratching their heads". As Samaha put it during an interview about Battlefield Earth, "I said, 'If John [Travolta] wants to make this movie, what does he want to get paid?' ... Because I do not pay anybody what they make. That is not my business plan."

Samaha is currently the President of Take 3 Productions, which produced Breaking Brooklyn (2016), a dance film starring Louis Gossett Jr., Nathan Kress and Colin Critchley.

In 2000, Samaha was sued by Intertainment Pictures [de], his business partners on a number of films. Intertainment won a $70 million judgment against Samaha for fraudulently overcharging them for production costs on the films.

In 2021, Samaha co-founded and served as the chairman of Luminosity Entertainment, to distribute, produce, and finance films in the U.S., as well as handle international sales, in which headquartered in West Hollywood. He co-produced the Wesley Snipes/Tiffany Haddish comedy, Back on the Strip, released in summer 2023 under the Luminosity title.

=== Controversy ===
In December 2000, the German-based Intertainment AG filed a lawsuit alleging that Franchise Pictures had fraudulently inflated budgets in films including Battlefield Earth, which Intertainment had helped to finance. Intertainment had agreed to pay 47% of the production costs of several films in exchange for European distribution rights, but ended up paying for between 60 and 90% of the costs instead. The company alleged that Franchise had defrauded it to the tune of over $75 million by systematically submitting "grossly fraudulent and inflated budgets". Intertainment won the case and was awarded $121.7 million in damages. Samaha was declared by the court to be personally liable for $77 million in damages.

=== Film ===
Key
†	Denotes films that have not yet been released

Year	Film	Credit	Notes
1995	The Immortals		
1996	Hollow Point	Executive producer	
1996	Danger Zone		
1996	The Last Days of Frankie the Fly		
1996	Natural Enemy		Direct-to-video
1997	American Perfekt	Executive producer	
1997	The Maker	Executive producer	
1997	The Peacekeeper	Executive producer	
1997	Top of the World		
1997	Lesser Prophets	Executive producer	
1998	Monument Ave.		
1998	20 Dates	Executive producer	
1998	Shadrach	Executive producer	
1998	Scar City		
1998	This Is My Father	Executive producer	
1998	Break Up		
1998	No Code of Conduct		
1998	Sweepers		
1998	Free Money	Executive producer	
1998	A Murder of Crows		
1999	Tycus	Executive producer	Direct-to-video
1999	The Confession		
1999	Entropy		
1999	Restraining Order	Executive producer	
1999	The Boondock Saints		
1999	Woman Wanted	Executive producer	
1999	Storm Catcher	Executive producer	Uncredited
1999	If... Dog... Rabbit...		
1999	The Third Miracle		
1999	The Big Kahuna		
1999	The White River Kid		
2000	Things You Can Tell Just by Looking at Her	Executive producer	
2000	Animal Factory		
2000	Jill Rips	Executive producer	Uncredited
2000	Mercy		
2000	The Whole Nine Yards	Executive producer	
2000	Battlefield Earth		
2000	Auggie Rose	Executive producer	
2000	The Art of War	Executive producer	
2000	Get Carter		
2000	Desperate But Not Serious	Executive producer	
2001	The Pledge		
2001	The Caveman's Valentine		
2001	Green Dragon		
2001	3000 Miles to Graceland		
2001	Driven		
2001	Angel Eyes		
2001	Plan B	Executive producer	
2001	Viva Las Nowhere	Executive producer	
2001	Heist		
2002	Zig Zag		
2002	FeardotCom	Executive producer	
2002	Avenging Angelo		
2002	City by the Sea		
2002	Ballistic: Ecks vs. Sever		
2002	Half Past Dead		
2003	The Foreigner		
2003	The In-Laws		
2003	Alex & Emma		
2004	Spartan		
2004	Laws of Attraction	Executive producer	
2004	The Whole Ten Yards		
2004	Out of Reach		Direct-to-video
2004	Funky Monkey	Executive producer	
2005	Into the Sun		
2005	A Sound of Thunder	Executive producer	
2005	Dead Fish	Executive producer	
2006	Tristan & Isolde		
2006	Rescue Dawn	Executive producer	
2006	Van Wilder: The Rise of Taj		
2007	If I Had Known I Was a Genius	Executive producer	
2007	Game of Life	Executive producer	
2007	I Could Never Be Your Woman	Executive producer	
2007	Trainwreck: My Life as an Idiot		
2007	The Flock		
2007	7-10 Split	Executive producer	
2007	The Anna Nicole Smith Story	Executive producer	
2008	Impulse	Executive producer	Direct-to-video
2008	Columbus Day	Executive producer	
2009	The Six Wives of Henry Lefay	Executive producer	
2016	Exposed	Executive producer	
2018	Breaking Brooklyn		
2022	Prophets of Change	Executive producer	Documentary film
2023	Back on the Strip		
2024	Love Me Dead	Executive producer	
2025	July 7: Who Killed the President of Haiti?	Executive producer	
TBA	The Exorcist Archives †	Executive producer	Completed
TBA	Paralysis †	Executive producer	Completed

As an actor

Year	Film	Role	Notes
1998	20 Dates	Producer	Voice role

As writer

Year	Film
1995	The Immortals

Music department

Year	Film	Role
2002	Ballistic: Ecks vs. Sever	Executive soundtrack producer

Thanks

Year	Film	Role
2003	Wonderland	The producers and director wish to thank
2018	Billionaire Boys Club	Special thanks

=== Television ===
Year	Title	Credit	Notes
1998	On the Border	Executive producer	Television film
2012	KDOC First Night 2013	Executive producer	Television special
2015	The 3rd Annual Noble Awards	Executive producer	Television special
