= The Foreigner (2003 film) =

- DVD cover
- Directed by: Michael Oblowitz
- Written by: Darren O. Campbell
- Produced by: Andrew Stevens; Elie Samaha; Steven Seagal; Kamal Aboukhater
- Starring: Steven Seagal; Harry Van Gorkum; Max Ryan
- Cinematography: Michael Slovis
- Edited by: Michael Kuge
- Music by: David Wurst; Eric Wurst
- Production companies: TriStar Pictures; Franchise Pictures
- Distributed by: Columbia TriStar Home Entertainment
- Release date: January 22, 2003
- Running time: 95 minutes
- Country: United States
- Language: English
- Budget: $16.7 million

The Foreigner is a 2003 American action thriller film starring Steven Seagal. The film was shot entirely in Warsaw, Poland, and was the first of a long string of direct-to-video films released starring Seagal from 2003 to 2009. The film recouped its budget from the US home video market alone.

== Plot ==
Jonathan "Jon" Cold (Steven Seagal) is a former "foreigner", or deep cover operative who now works as a freelance agent who is frequently commissioned to deliver high-risk packages.

As Jon prepares for his father's funeral, Alexander Marquet (Philip Dunbar) asks him to take on an assignment. Jon is keen to leave the business, but he reluctantly accepts the job.

His task is to take a mysterious package from France to a wealthy man in Germany. But Jon will soon find that there are a lot of people who are determined to prevent him from doing so. Jon is accompanied by Dunoir (Max Ryan) to a farmhouse to pick up the package, and they are attacked by assassins.

Jon fights them off and decides to continue with the assignment. Leaving Dunoir behind in France, Jon heads for his father Jackson's memorial service in Warsaw, Poland, and Jon meets up with his brother Sean (Jeffrey Pierce) before continuing on to Germany.

The package turns out to contain a black box flight recorder from an aircraft that had been suspiciously downed, and the recipient – sinister industrialist Jerome Van Aken (Harry Van Gorkum) – has a vested interest in it.

Once he arrives in Germany, Jon discovers that he is being pursued by various agents and assassins, while Van Aken's wife Meredith (Anna-Louise Plowman) and CIA spook Jared Olyphant (Gary Raymond) also seem to want to get hold of the package.

== Cast ==
- Steven Seagal as CIA Agent Jonathan "Jon" Cold
- Max Ryan as Dunoir
- Harry Van Gorkum as Jerome Van Aken
- Jeffrey Pierce as Sean Cold
- Anna-Louise Plowman as Meredith Van Aken
- Sherman Augustus as Mr. Mimms
- Gary Raymond as CIA Agent Jared Olyphant
- Philip Dunbar as Alexander Marquee
- Izabela Okrasa as Clarissa Van Aken
- Grzegorz Kowalczyk as Rolls-Royce Driver
- Dianna Camacho as Hotel Clerk Imke
- Deobia Oparei as The Stranger
- Grzegorz Emanuel as Jonathan Look Alike
- Przemyslaw Saleta as Security Guard
- Jan Jurewicz as Man With Porsche
- Łukasz Jakóbiak as Waiter In Paris Brasserie

== Production ==
Kate Fischer has a small role.

== Sequel ==
A sequel to The Foreigner, titled Black Dawn, was released in 2005. Seagal's character John Cold is the only character who returns from the original.

== Reception ==
The Foreigner was released straight to video without receiving a theatrical release. It was critically panned for its nonsensical plot, poor acting, Seagal's lack of martial arts and the low-quality filmmaking. On Rotten Tomatoes it has an approval rating of 0% based on reviews from 5 critics.
