= Black Thunder (film) =

- Directed by: Rick Jacobson
- Written by: William C. Martell
- Produced by: Ashok Amritraj; Andrew Stevens
- Starring: Michael Dudikoff; Richard Norton
- Release date: September 19, 1998 (USA)
- Running time: 96 minutes
- Country: United States
- Language: English

Black Thunder is a 1998 American action film directed by Rick Jacobson and starring Michael Dudikoff and Richard Norton. The story follows Vince (Michael Dudikoff) and Jannick (Gary Hudson) as they are sent to retrieve a newly developed American stealth plane stolen by Libyan terrorists.

== Plot ==
When a top secret jet fighter prototype is stolen, the Pentagon sends test-pilot Vince Conners and his partner Jannick to recover the plane. After Jannick is captured, Vince faces terrorists, deadly nerve gas, and his own mentor, who has become the enemy's ace pilot.

== Cast ==
- Michael Dudikoff as Vince Conners
- Richard Norton as Ratcher
- Marcus Aurelius as Hinkle
- Catherine Bell as Lisa
- Michael Cavanaugh as General Barnes
- Frederic Forrest as The Admiral
- John Furey as Moore
- Landon Hall as Eileen
- Gary Hudson as Jannick
- John Lafayette as Demuth
- Robert Madrid as Stone
- Robert Miranda as Rojar
- Dean Scofield as Captain Jones
- Sonny Surowiec as Alias
- Marc Vahanian as Radio Operator
- Nancy Valen as Mela
- John Patrick White as Winston
