= Heist (2001 film) =

2001 film by David Mamet

- Theatrical release poster
- Directed by: David Mamet
- Written by: David Mamet
- Produced by: Art Linson; Elie Samaha; Andrew Stevens
- Starring: Gene Hackman; Danny DeVito; Delroy Lindo; Sam Rockwell; Rebecca Pidgeon; Ricky Jay
- Cinematography: Robert Elswit
- Edited by: Barbara Tulliver
- Music by: Theodore Shapiro
- Production companies: Franchise Pictures; Indelible Pictures
- Distributed by: Morgan Creek Productions, Inc. (through Warner Bros. Pictures)
- Release dates: September 10, 2001 (TIFF); November 9, 2001 (United States)
- Running time: 109 minutes
- Country: United States
- Language: English
- Budget: $28 million
- Box office: $28.5 million

Heist is a 2001 American heist crime drama film written and directed by David Mamet and starring Gene Hackman, Danny DeVito and Delroy Lindo in their second collaboration following Get Shorty (1995), with Rebecca Pidgeon, Ricky Jay, Patti Lupone and Sam Rockwell in supporting roles.

Heist premiered at the 2001 Toronto International Film Festival on September 10, 2001, before being released by Morgan Creek Productions, Inc. (through Warner Bros. Pictures) on November 9, 2001, in the United States. The film received generally positive reviews from critics, with praise for its characters and script. Although it grossed just around its production budget, the film became the highest-grossing film directed by Mamet in the United States with $23 million and went on to become a popular hit in the home video market.

== Plot ==
Joe Moore runs a ring of professional thieves, which includes Bobby Blane, Donnie "Pinky" Pincus, and Joe's wife Fran. During a robbery of a New York City jewelry store, Joe takes off his mask in a successful effort to distract the store's last remaining employee, allowing his face to be captured by a security camera; he is unable to retrieve the video evidence before they have to flee. As both the photo and a witness can identify him, Joe retires from crime and plans to disappear on his sailboat with Fran.

This does not sit well with Joe's fence Mickey Bergman, who runs a garment business as a front. Having accrued significant expenses in setting up another robbery, Bergman decides to withhold the payment of the jewelry heist from Joe and his crew, so that they go through with the next job—robbing an airplane carrying a large shipment of gold. Bergman further insists that his nephew, Jimmy Silk, be a part of the crew. Joe accepts, but a series of shifting loyalties changes the complexity of their task, including Jimmy's interest in Fran, along with Bergman's and Jimmy's belief that Joe's skills are declining.

While setting up an element needed for the robbery, the crew are stopped by a passing police officer. While Joe and Bobby talk the officer into leaving, an agitated Jimmy draws his gun but is stopped by Pinky. Joe forces the team out of finishing the job by leading Jimmy to believe that Pinky did not destroy the getaway car, covered in the team's fingerprints. The deceit is discovered, and Bergman forces them to finish the job.

The plane robbery is a series of misdirects. Pinky poses as a guard while Joe, Bobby, and Jimmy pose as airport security personnel. They stop the jet, pretending to be responding to an emergency. They fill a van with what they take from the plane, then move it to a rented garage on the airport grounds, where they rebrand it and call for a tow truck to have it hauled away.

Jimmy betrays the others to steal the gold and Fran. He knocks out Joe and tells Fran he knows Joe has changed the plan. He and Fran take the van, but Jimmy discovers the hidden compartments are filled with metal washers.

Joe avoids arrest and returns to the plane in disguise. He and Bobby remove a shipment of goods they had booked on board the same Swiss flight, which they insist now must be driven to its destination due to the plane's delay. Inside the shipment is the stolen gold, which Joe and Bobby melt into numerous 7-foot-long rods.

Bergman apprehends Pinky, who is walking his niece to school. Pinky discloses the plan in order to save his niece, but he tips off Joe with a code word during a phone call and is killed. Bergman and his crew arrive at Joe's sailboat along with Jimmy and Fran, where they hold Joe at gunpoint. They assume that the boat's golden railings are the gold.

Fran leaves with Jimmy, pleading with Bergman to let Joe go. Just as Bergman discovers that the railings are not the gold, a hidden Bobby opens fire. They kill Bergman's men, then Joe kills Bergman. Bobby gives Joe the address to send his share.

Joe waits to meet Fran with a truck filled with black-painted rods, but Fran has switched sides. She holds up Joe with Jimmy, taking that truck, and Joe gets into a second truck to leave. A black bar in this truck scrapes the garage door, revealing gold underneath. Joe lifts a tarp in the truck bed, revealing the gold rods. He covers the rods with a tarpaulin and smiles as he drives away.

== Cast ==
- Gene Hackman as Joe Moore
- Danny DeVito as Mickey Bergman
- Delroy Lindo as Bobby Blane
- Rebecca Pidgeon as Fran Moore
- Sam Rockwell as Jimmy Silk
- Ricky Jay as Donnie "Pinky" Pinkus
- Patti LuPone as Betty Croft

== Production ==
Franchise Pictures agreed to finance the film as long as it starred Gene Hackman and Danny DeVito. David Mamet enjoyed great creative freedom throughout production because Franchise Pictures did not creatively interfere, only requiring him to finish the film within a certain budget.

The film, set mostly in and around Boston, was shot in Montreal. The opening scene, showcasing a New York jewelry store robbery, was filmed in an Old Montreal building in the process of being renovated into a hotel. The airport scenes, set at Boston's Logan Airport, were filmed at Montréal–Mirabel International Airport.

The film made a profit through international pre-sales before it was finished.

== Reception ==
=== Critical response ===
On the review aggregator website Rotten Tomatoes, 67% of 132 critics' reviews are positive, with an average rating of 6.3/10. The website's consensus reads: "Heist didn't cover any new ground, but the cast and Mamet's expertise with witty banter make it worthwhile." Metacritic, which uses a weighted average, assigned the film a score of 66 out of 100, based on 33 critics, indicating "generally favorable" reviews. Audiences polled by CinemaScore gave the film an average grade of "B−" on an A+ to F scale.

Roger Ebert for the Chicago Sun-Times, wrote, "Heist is the kind of caper movie that was made before special effects replaced wit, construction and intelligence. This movie is made out of fresh ingredients, not cake mix. Despite the twists of its plot, it is about its characters." He went on to praise Mamet's trademark verbal constructions, his restrained approach to on-screen gunplay, and the care that he takes in shaping the relationships between the principals.

=== Box office ===
Heist grossed $23.5 million in the U.S. and Canada and $5 million in other territories, for a worldwide total of $28.5 million.

In its opening weekend, the film opened at number 5 and grossed $7.8 million from 1,891 theaters in the United States. It became the highest-grossing Mamet-directed film domestically.

=== Home video ===
The film generated more than $72 million in home video rentals in the United States.
