= If... Dog... Rabbit... =

- Directed by: Matthew Modine
- Written by: Matthew Modine
- Produced by: Ashok Amritraj; Elie Samaha; Andrew Stevens
- Starring: Matthew Modine; John Hurt; Bruce Dern; Kevin J. O'Connor
- Cinematography: Rob Sweeney
- Edited by: Craig Nisker
- Music by: Deeji Mincey; Boris Zelkin
- Production company: Franchise Pictures
- Distributed by: New City Releasing; Rabbit Productions
- Release date: September 10, 1999 (Oldenburg)
- Running time: 108 minutes
- Country: United States
- Languages: English; Spanish

If... Dog... Rabbit..., also known as One Last Score, is a 1999 American crime drama thriller film written, directed by and starring Matthew Modine, in his feature film debut as a director. It also stars John Hurt, Kevin J. O'Connor, Bruce Dern, David Keith and Lisa Marie.

== Plot ==
Johnnie Cooper (Modine), fresh out of prison for armed robbery, finds work at a gas station to try to start a new life. His parole officer, Gilmore (Keith), lets Cooper's father Sean (Hurt), who he strongly suspects was also involved in the robbery, know about his release because of good behavior. Johnnie later calls his home where his brother Jamie (O'Connor) answers. Jamie and his girlfriend Judy (Marie) visit Johnnie and invite him home for a barbecue. Johnnie's boss (Dern) encourages Johnnie to go after work. It is learned that Johnnie, Jamie, and their father were all involved in the heist that got Johnnie in prison. After getting into a fight with his father, who is revealed to have left Johnnie behind to the cops on their last heist, Johnnie goes to a bar with Jamie and Judy. When Jamie tries to rob some Mexican drug dealers, and they fight him back, Johnnie intervenes, accidentally killing one of the Mexicans. Johnnie, Jamie and Judy all drive away.

The next morning, Gilmore arrives at the Johnnie's workplace, having heard about the incident, to interrogate Johnnie about where he was last night. Being convinced that Johnnie was at his family's barbecue, Gilmore starts to leave, but Jamie, afraid of going to jail, knocks him out over the head with a wooden board. Freaking out, Johnnie takes Gilmore to the hospital, and later goes on the run with Jamie, and tells Judy to stay in town to not get involved.

Johnnie takes Jamie, who is convinced that Gilmore is dead, along to work at a tortilla factory owned by a Mexican friend, Villalobos, in Tijuana, to hide out for a few months. While working there for several weeks, which makes Jamie uneasy, they conspire with another long-time employee, Cesar (Palomino), to pull off a heist at a bullring to finally get out of Tijuana. Gilmore, who has been recovering from his injury, searches for Johnnie and Jamie by interrogating different people, including Judy. This worries Judy, who later tries to find Jamie in Tijuana and inform him and Johnnie about how Gilmore isn't really dead. Johnnie tries to send Judy away, but she is later kidnapped by the Mexican drug dealers from the beginning when they recognize Johnnie working at the tortilla factory and see her there.

Villalobos and Sean eventually discover the scheme the brothers and Cesar are planning at the bullring and want to be part of it. Johnnie tries to get out of it all when he learns Gilmore survived the blow to the head, but Sean convinces him to stay and help out. While going through with their plan, Judy is tortured by her abductors until she reveals Jamie's heist plans. The dealers go to find Jamie in retribution for the killing of one of their men, and Judy escapes from them and tries to get to Jamie before they do. While Johnnie and Cesar are robbing the cashiers at the bullring, Jamie gets their getaway car ready to go to the beach, where Sean is supposed to be waiting for them all on a speedboat. Judy arrives at the bullring to reunite with Jamie, but the drug dealers also arrive. As Johnnie and Cesar try to get into the getaway car, a shootout ensues with the drug dealers, which catches the attention of the bullring guards, who also get involved. In the ensuing gunfight, Judy, Jamie, Cesar, and some of the dealers are killed, and Johnnie tries to get away with the money to the beach. The guards call the police to help catch Johnnie. When Sean sees Johnnie arriving with the money, but with some policemen on his heels, he uses the speedboat to escape, leaving Johnnie behind again to be arrested for the robbery.

The film ends with a flashback where as kids, Johnnie is explaining to Jamie the art of theft.

== Cast ==
- Matthew Modine as Johnnie Cooper
- John Hurt as Sean Cooper
- Lisa Marie as Judy
- Bruce Dern as McGurdy
- David Keith as Parole Officer Gilmore
- Kevin J. O'Connor as Jamie Cooper
- Carlos Palomino as Cesar
- Susan Traylor as Lulu
- Julie Newmar as Judy's Mother
- Pauly Fuemana as Mr Scary

== Reception ==
Christopher Null of Contactmusic.com gave the film two and a half stars out of five.
