= Billy Frankenstein =

- DVD release cover
- Directed by: Fred Olen Ray
- Written by: Donald G. Jackson; Marty Jackson; Kim Ray
- Produced by: Ashok Amritraj; Andrew Stevens
- Starring: Vernon Wells; Tommy Kirk; Darran Norris; Melissa Williamson; Peter Spellos; Brian Carrillo; Jordan Lamoureux
- Edited by: Randy Carter
- Production company: Royal Oaks Entertainment
- Release date: 1998
- Running time: 95 minutes
- Country: United States
- Language: English

Billy Frankenstein is a 1998 horror-comedy movie directed by Fred Olen Ray and written by Donald G. Jackson, Marty Jackson, and Kim Ray.

== Plot ==
Billy Frankenstein tells the story of a child named Billy Frank, who is a distant relative of Victor Frankenstein, along with his artistic mother Sandy and workaholic father George. Meanwhile, a man named Bloodstone dreams of bringing the Frankenstein monster to life, but is now unable to because the Frankenstein castle is up for auction. He invites the Franks to move into the castle in the hopes of using Billy (who is the latest relative to Frankenstein) to bring the monster to life. Also, an unintelligent officer named Constable Frogg has a family history of other Froggs capturing the Frankenstein monster, and dreams of continuing the legacy. Frogg also constantly receives phone calls from prank callers who say "ribbit ribbit". Frogg is hired by a man named Otto von Sloane and his lady Fraulein to scare the Franks into selling him the castle and make way for a mall.

Billy, his mother Sandy and Billy's aunt Thelma arrive at the castle and meet Bloodstone, who introduces himself as the caretaker of the house. Billy discovers one of Dr. Frankenstein's books about life and death and finds a map of the castle inside the book which leads him into the basement where he discovers the inanimate Frankenstein monster. When Billy falls asleep in the basement, the monster comes to life. Rather than being scary and threatening, the monster turns out to be friendly and confused. Billy wakes up later to discover the monster had gotten loose and goes out to find him, as does Bloodstone, who hires Sloane's lawyer (who announced the house repossession) to find Billy and the monster. Frogg disguises himself as a cable guy and sets up microphones around the house. Billy eventually comes across the monster, befriends it and brings the monster, poorly disguised as his grandmother, through a nearby village. Soon though, the monster begins to run out of power and so Billy and Bloodstone take him back to the lab basement to recharge him.

Billy's father, George, finally arrives home much to Billy's excitement. George announces that he got fired from his job, but is not worried because of his family importance and inheritance to the castle, but Billy and Sandy tell him that the lawyer had told them earlier in the film that they need to raise $25,000 to buy the castle, so George comes up with the idea of inviting Sloane to dinner to discuss the payment. Billy and Bloodstone try bring the monster back to life, but leave when they think they've failed, but the monster shows signs of life when they leave. Billy and Bloodstone try to hide the monster from prying eyes, but Thelma faints after seeing him. Sloane and Fraulein visit Frogg to find he has disguised himself as the monster, which Sloane takes an interest in. While out shopping, George and Sandy buy a Frankenstein monster doll to give to Billy as a present and arrive home to give Billy the doll and have dinner with Sloane and Fraulein. Finally, Sandy sees the monster for herself, who Sloane mistakes for Frogg. When Sloane is convinced of the monster's existence, he and Fraulein both flee.

The film ends with the Franks, Thelma, Bloodstone and Frogg, raising the $25,000 by having tourist attractions in their castle, complete with photos with the Frankenstein monster and tours down to the lab, where a little girl pulls the lever and electrocutes herself, making her resemble the Bride of Frankenstein. When the Franks end up wondering what happened to Sloane's lawyer, we see the lawyer, still looking for Billy and the monster, asking Dracula where they are, and Dracula points into the direction of Transylvania, which the lawyer follows.

== Cast ==
- Jordan Lamoureux as Billy Frankenstein
- Mary Elizabeth McGlynn as Sandy Frankenstein (credited as Melissa Williamson)
- Daran Norris as George Frankenstein (credited as Daran W. Norris) and Dr. Frankenstein (photographic cameo)
- Peter Spellos as Bloodstone
- Brian Carrillo as Frankenstein Monster
- Kristin Jadrnicek as Thelma
- Vernon Wells as Otto Von Sloane
- Griffin Drew as Fraulein
- John Maynard as Constable Frogg
- Tommy Kirk as Blind Monk
- Vanessa Koman is also credited by some sources

== Reception ==
TV guide describes it as a comic chiller. The Portuguese RTP website finds the film is an entertaining horror comedy.
