= Five Aces =

- DVD cover
- Directed by: David O'Neill
- Written by: David O'Neill; David Sherrill; Kevin Bernhardt (uncredited)
- Produced by: David O'Neill; Andrew Stevens
- Starring: Charlie Sheen; Christopher McDonald
- Narrated by: Aimée Leigh
- Music by: Michael Muhlfriedel; John Remark
- Production company: Phoenician Entertainment
- Distributed by: Revolution Studios; Morgan Creek Entertainment
- Release dates: October 9, 1999 (NYFF); May 21, 2002 (DVD release)
- Running time: 95 minutes
- Country: United States
- Language: English

Five Aces is a 1999 American black comedy drama film written, produced and directed by David Michael O'Neill. It stars Charlie Sheen, Christopher McDonald, Jeff Cesario, Michael McGrady, Tia Carrere, Geoffrey Lewis, and Matt Clark.

The film was released direct-to-video in many countries.

== Plot ==
Chris Martin is a bachelor about to marry his longtime girlfriend. Wanting to enjoy his last few days as a single man, Chris spends several nights hanging out with his old high school friends, the "Five Aces". Chris, Ray, Ash, Todd and Sean spend the week at a winter cabin in their hometown, drinking, swapping life stories, and chasing women. Over the course of forty-eight hours, Chris witnesses the blow-up of one his friend's marriages, runs into an old flame looking to rekindle their relationship, and starts to have second thoughts about his upcoming nuptials.

== Cast ==
- Charlie Sheen as Chris Martin
- Christopher McDonald as Ash Gray
- David Sherrill as Ray Vanowen
- Jeff Cesario as Todd Lackey
- Michael McGrady as Sean Haggerty
- Tia Carrere as Karen Haggerty
- Matt Clark as Phillip
- Virginia Hamilton as Kelly
- Geoffrey Lewis as Sloan
- Patricia Skeriotis as Sofia Panagoulis
- Aimée Leigh as Shauna
- Hannes Jaenicke as Hustler
- John LaMotta as Grandfather Yorgas
- Elizabeth Morehead as Lauren Ely-Davis

== Reception ==
Writing for Film Freak, Walter Chaw said, "For fully half the picture's brief 95 minutes, Five Aces presents surprisingly realistic and sympathetic characters engaging in well-written and performed conversations...The film earns a recommendation for the rapport and general likeability of our sensitive heroes, but it comes with the warning that Five Aces only maintains its integrity for about an act-and-a-half before succumbing to the mawkish and the easy."
