= The White Raven (1998 film) =

- Directed by: Jakub Z. Rucinski; Andrew Stevens
- Written by: Michael Blodgett (Novel and screenplay)
- Produced by: Ashok Amritraj; Andrew Stevens
- Starring: Ron Silver; Joanna Pacuła; Roy Scheider; Hannes Jaenicke; Elizabeth Shepherd
- Cinematography: Michael Slovis
- Edited by: Brett Hedlund
- Music by: Norman Orenstein; David Wurst; Eric Wurst
- Distributed by: Astra Cinema
- Release date: 1998
- Running time: 92 minutes
- Country: United States
- Language: English

The White Raven is a 1998 action crime thriller directed by Jakub Z. Rucinski and Andrew Stevens and starring Ron Silver, Joanna Pacuła and Roy Scheider. The film is based on the novel of the same name by Michael Blodgett.

== Reception ==
The film received poor reviews from critics. Emanuel Levy gave it two stars out of five. Brian Webster gave the film a 39/100.
