= Steel Sharks =

- DVD cover
- Directed by: Rodney McDonald
- Written by: Rodney McDonald; William C. Martell
- Produced by: Ashok Amritraj; Andrew Stevens
- Starring: Gary Busey; Billy Dee Williams; Billy Warlock
- Cinematography: Bryan Greenberg
- Edited by: W. Peter Miller
- Music by: David Lawrence
- Production companies: Royal Oaks Entertainment, Inc.
- Release date: June 25, 1997
- Running time: 94 minutes

Steel Sharks is a 1997 American direct-to-video action film directed by Rodney McDonald and starring Gary Busey, Billy Dee Williams and Billy Warlock. It concerns a group of Navy SEALs who are captured and taken aboard an Iranian submarine from which they must escape to survive. The film was released straight-to-video. Several scenes involving Navy helicopter, ship, and command footage from this film were used in the production of Crash Dive, Freedom Strike, Counter Measures and Agent Red.

== Plot ==
A news report announces a revolution has overthrown the Iranian government. This coincides with the disappearance of an American UN chemical weapons inspector, Dr. John Van Tasset (Barry Livingston), in Iraq. The US is determined to stage a rescue, fearing that he will be used to develop weapons for the new Iranian government. A Navy SEAL team is recruited for the mission, but is down a member due to illness. The replacement, Bob Rodgers, (Billy Warlock), is a young SEAL fresh out of school. The SEAL team is flown out to an aircraft carrier group in the Persian Gulf, where they meet Rear Admiral Jim Perry (Billy Dee Williams), who commands the fleet and the rescue mission, and will be dispatched from a submarine to rescue the scientist from where he is being held in Iran.

Upon arrival at the submarine, Cmdr. Bill McKay (Gary Busey) is introduced and the SEALs are quickly sent off to rescue Dr. Tasset. They stalk quietly through the Iranian compound killing everyone they meet. After rescuing Dr. Tasset from an interrogation, they try to sneak back to the US submarine but are discovered by a group of soldiers that alert the entire base. They get into a gun battle where one of the members of the team is killed and the others are ultimately captured. They are taken to a new secret Iranian submarine for safe keeping.

On board the Iranian submarine, the leader of the SEAL team is taken to Captain Reza Lashgar (Shaun Toub) who shoots him despite the protests of others on the crew. The sonar technician aboard the US submarine detects the sound of gunshots and McKay begins to follow the Iranian submarine. Simultaneously, the SEAL Team realizes they have to escape to survive and plan an ambush of the guards, which works flawlessly. They split up, one group to head straight to the escape hatch and the other to communicate their escape to the US submarine. Through this electronic communication, McKay is aware that the SEALs have escaped and begins to hunt the Iranian submarine to buy time. They are engaged multiple times by the submarine, but expertly evade their torpedoes. With the help of Bob Rodgers' lucky coin, both groups of SEALs are able to reach the escape hatch and leave the submarine. McKay deftly leads the Iranian submarine down a narrow canyon, resulting in the submarine striking the canyon wall with a torpedo and being sunk by the falling debris. Enraged, Captain Lashgar blows the ballast and the Iranian submarine rises for one last attack. Knowing the SEALs are safe, McKay torpedoes and destroys the Iranian submarine.

== Cast ==
- Gary Busey as Commander Bill McKay
- Billy Dee Williams as Rear Admiral Jim Perry
- Billy Warlock as Bob Rogers
- Shaun Toub as Captain Reza Lashgar
- Robert Miranda as Gregorov
- David Roberson as Lieutenant Dave Zamborski
- Barry Livingston as Dr. John Van Tasset
- Tim Abell as Cord
- Mathew St. Patrick as Mattox
- Eric Lawson as Vice Admiral Evans
- Tim Lounibos as Mack
- Matthew R. Anderson as Petty Officer Kaplan
- Larry Poindexter as Dobbins
- Anthony Griffith as Bernie
- Miranda Wolfe as Lieutenant Hickey

== Production ==
Producer Andrew Stevens wrote that Gary Busey had an insurance exclusion for exposure to horse saliva while working on Steel Sharks. Fortunately for the production of the film it was "set on a submarine, so there was little likelihood of that."

The US submarine in the film is named the USS Oakland and is identified as SSN-798. This submarine identifier now corresponds to the Virginia-class submarine the USS Massachusetts, which is currently under construction. According to special thanks credits given at the end of the film the USS Oakland was portrayed by the USS La Jolla (SSN-701) and USS Portsmouth (SSN-707), and the supercarrier in the film was portrayed by the USS Constellation (CV-64) and the USS Nimitz (CV-68).

== Reception ==
A review by The Movie Scene gave this film 2 out of 5 stars.

The film was featured in the series We Found It on Watch Instantly on Grantland.com.

Noted scholar Jack Shaheen included Steel Sharks in his book Reel Bad Arabs as an example of the "bad Arab character" and draws similarities between this film and the film Navy SEALs.
