= Sara Melson =

American singer-songwriter and actress

- Education: Harvard University
- Occupations: Singer; songwriter; actress
- Years active: 1990–present
- Website: https://saramelson.com/

Sara Melson is an American singer, songwriter, and actress. She has appeared on television shows including The Wonder Years, Frasier, and Beverly Hills, 90210.

A song from her debut album, Dirty Mind, released by Nettwerk Music Group in 2008, was featured on Grey's Anatomy. She has performed with Moby, Ben Folds, Juliana Hatfield, Mojave 3, and Silversun Pickups.

== Early life and education ==
Melson was raised in West Lafayette, Indiana, by her parents, both professors at Purdue University. She started classical piano training, dancing, singing, and acting in childhood. She danced ballet professionally before attending Harvard University, where she received a degree in English. After graduating, she moved to Los Angeles, where she gained attention in a production of Anton Chekhov's The Cherry Orchard at University of Southern California.

== Career ==
=== Acting ===
Melson's acting career included roles in The Wonder Years (1992), Married ... With Children (1993), Murder, She Wrote (1994), and Frasier (1994), and the movies Malice (1993), The Low Life (1995) and The Big Brass Ring (1999).She had a recurring role on Beverly Hills, 90210 as Alison Lash.

=== Music ===
Melson began her music career opening for Jill Sobule in 2001. Her first EP was released in 2003. Her debut album, Dirty Mind, was released on Nettwerk in 2008. A song from the album, "Feel It Coming", was featured on Grey's Anatomy. She released three subsequent albums and two EPs. Her 2021 single "Wound Too Tight" was made in collaboration with Rami Jaffee, the keyboardist for the Foo Fighters.

== Filmography ==
- Sisters (1991)
- The Wonder Years (1992)
- Dr. Giggles (1992)
- Married ... With Children (1993)
- Class of '96 (1993)
- Big Wave Dave's (1993)
- Malice (1993)
- Bakersfield, P.D. (1993)
- Murder, She Wrote (1994)
- Frasier (1994)
- The Low Life (1995)
- Beverly Hills, 90210 (1995)
- Boston Common (1996)
- Clueless (1999)
- Desperate But Not Serious (1999)
- The Big Brass Ring (1999)
- Track Down (2000)

== Discography ==
=== Studio albums ===
- Dirty Mind (2008)
- The Beachwood Canyon Sessions (2012)
- A Million White Stars (2013)
- Safe and Sound (2016)

=== EPs ===
- five song EP (2003)
- Wild & Precious Life (2020)
- Christmas Lullabies (2021)
