= Dark Moon Rising =

- Directed by: Dana Mennie
- Written by: Dana Mennie; Ian Cook
- Produced by: Richard Cueto; Dana Mennie; Lance H. Robbins; Julie Snider Mennie
- Starring: Max Ryan; María Conchita Alonso; Chris Divecchio; Chris Mulkey; Ginny Weirick; Sid Haig; Billy Drago; Lin Shaye
- Cinematography: Mark Ream
- Edited by: Michael Spence
- Music by: Geoff Gibbons
- Distributed by: Grindhouse Entertainment Group
- Release date: October 10, 2009 (US)
- Running time: 124 minutes
- Country: United States
- Language: English
- Budget: $3,000,000

Dark Moon Rising (aka Wolf Moon) is a 2009 American horror film directed by Dana Mennie who also co-wrote the movie with Ian Cook. The film is about a small town girl, Amy (played by Ginny Weirick), who falls for wanderer (Chris Diveccio). The film also stars María Conchita Alonso and Max Ryan as two local townspeople who try to save the town from destruction.

== Plot ==
A girl named Amy falls in love with the new boy in town. Dan is a drifter from out of town who carries a dark secret with him.

In the beginning Amy's friends tell her to go talk to Dan, who is working in an auto shop. He treats Amy with disinterest until he realizes that he has hurt her feelings. He asks to give her a ride home. Amy's father doesn't trust Dan from the beginning. Dan's a drifter, so people automatically don't trust him. But, the reason people don't trust him is because of the vibes he gives off. Amy and Dan get to know each other as the movie progresses. Meanwhile, Dan's father, Bender, is out killing people only a few states over. Dan's dad eventually shows up and kills a dog along with a horse. Sam, the local sheriff and Amy's dad, investigate the murders and eventually connect them to the killings from other states. The two eventually discover Charles Thibodeaux. Charles tells them that he knows Bender from a while ago and Bender is a werewolf. Charles put Bender in jail a while back, and he escaped seeking revenge. Bender killed Charles' wife brutally and Charles never got over it.

== Cast ==
- Max Ryan as Darkman / Bender
- María Conchita Alonso as Sheriff Samantha "Sam" Pantoja
- Chris Mulkey as John
- Sid Haig as Louis "Crazy Louis"
- Chris Diveccio as Dan / Creature Dan
- Billy Drago as Charles Thibodeaux
- Lin Shaye as Sunny
- Arielle Vandenberg as Nicole
- Rikki Gagne as Stacy
- Norman Mora as Chico
- Ginny Weirick as Amy
- Joe Ordaz as Jim
- Dana Mennie as Earl
- Tony Demeo as Deputy Tony
- Julie Snider Mennie as Shanee Thibodeaux
- Rich Uhl as Rich
- Linda Uhl as Linda
- Chuck Frye as Duke
- Sandy Baskiewicz as Deb
- Claire Grieve as Candy
- Bethany Wallin as Lisa
- Lark Williams as The Madam
- Jasmina Hdagha as Bar Vixen
- Ariana Malik as The Tart
- Diesel as Norman The Dog (credited as Diesel 'D2')
- Kyrie as 1968 AMX

== About the director ==
Dark Moon Rising is Dana Mennie's debut film. Dana Mennie also wrote, produced, and starred in Dark Moon Rising. Dana was at first against casting Chris DiVeccio as Dan, but Chris had a friend that was close to Dana and he was eventually persuaded.

== Release ==
Dark Moon Rising was a selection at the Freak Show Horror Film Festival on October 10, 2009.

It was released on DVD June 22, 2010 under the title Wolf Moon.
