= Lisa Marie (actress) =

American actress and model (born 1968)

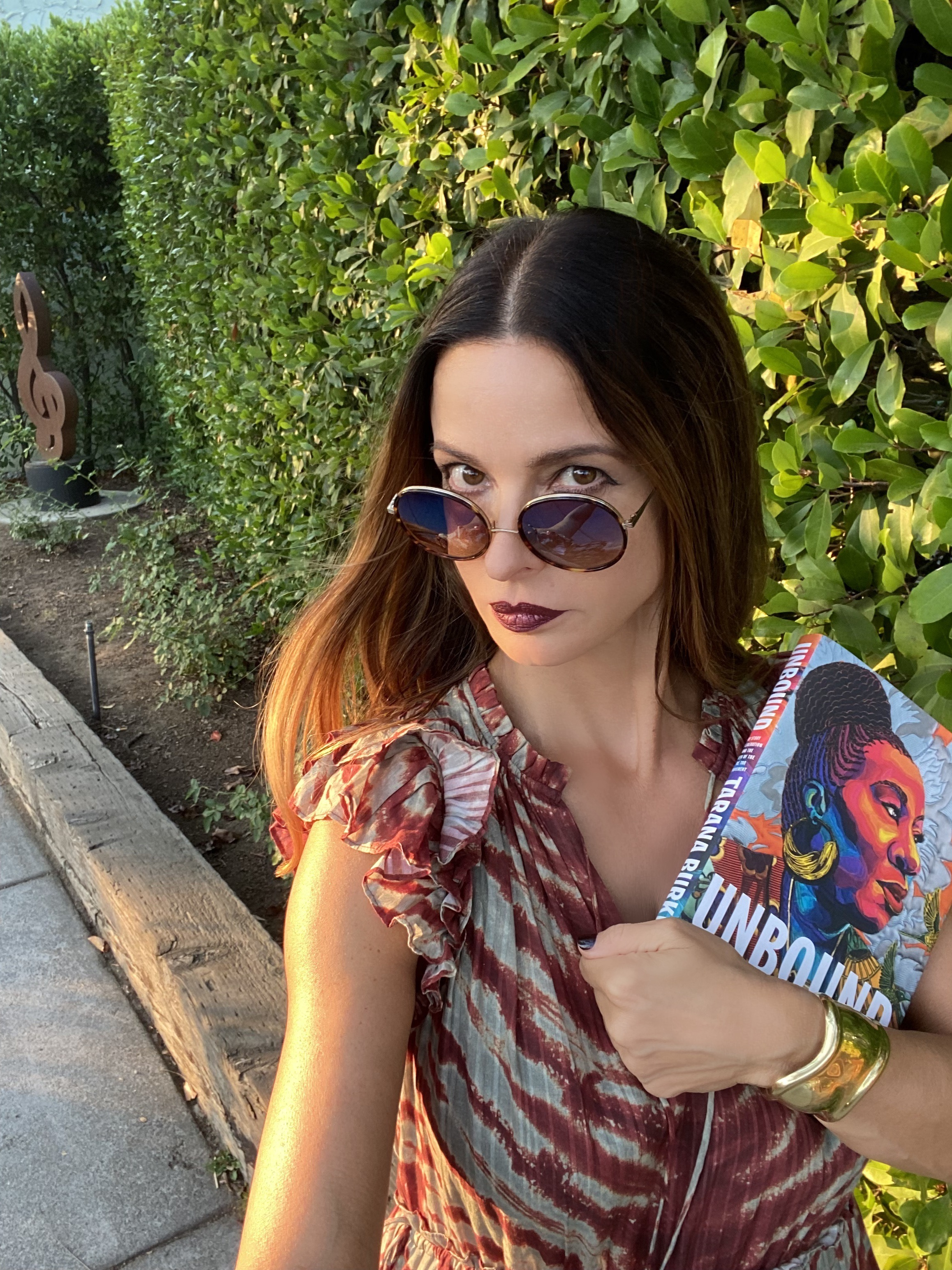
- Marie in 2022
- Born: Lisa Marie Smith; December 5, 1968 (age 57); Piscataway, New Jersey, U.S.
- Occupations: Actress; model
- Years active: 1980s–present
- Height: 5 ft 6 in (1.68 m)
- Partner: Tim Burton (1992–2001)

Lisa Marie Smith (born December 5, 1968), known professionally as Lisa Marie (sometimes also referred to as Lisa Marie Burton), is an American actress, model and producer. She is best known for her roles with Tim Burton: as Vampira in Ed Wood (1994), the Martian Girl in Mars Attacks! (1996), Lady Crane in Sleepy Hollow (1999), and Nova in Planet of the Apes (2001).

== Early life ==
Marie was born in Piscataway, New Jersey, where she was raised by her father and grandparents. She studied ballet for eight years at the New Jersey Ballet and learned classical piano. She moved to New York City at age 15 to study theatre, dance and music.

== Career ==
She was a model for Robert Mapplethorpe in some of his prints. She was featured in photographer Bruce Weber's ad campaign as the “Obsession Girl” for designer Calvin Klein's Obsession perfume. She was also in numerous ad campaigns including Equinox Gyms, Malcolm McLaren’s vogueing project, and Timex commercials.

Marie went on to appear briefly in Let's Get Lost, Weber's documentary on the life of jazz trumpeter Chet Baker, and had a small role in Woody Allen's film Alice. She starred in Matthew Modine’s directorial debut, If... Dog... Rabbit.... In 1989 she appeared on Malcolm McLaren's song "Something's Jumpin' in Your Shirt" from his 1989 album Waltz Darling. From 2000 to 2002 she hosted the short film series Exposure on the Sci-Fi Channel. She was in Rob Zombie’s 2012 movie The Lords of Salem.

Marie has appeared in magazines including Maxim, Playboy, and Esquire. She has also had her own photographs exhibited and published in magazines; Vanity Fair ran side-by-side photos taken by her and her partner, film director Tim Burton. Marie appeared in several of Burton's films in key roles to bring a sense and feel of mysticism, spirit and sensuality, including portraying actress/1950s television horror movie hostess Vampira in the 1994 biopic Ed Wood. This role included a special music video in which her Vampira character danced for a Special Edition DVD release. As his fiancée, she was his main muse for a whole decade. Her features are allegedly the uncredited basis for ragdoll love interest Sally in Tim’s stop-motion classic The Nightmare Before Christmas (1993).

Nightmare director Henry Selick credited Lisa as a good influence on Tim’s personal life, with her pushing him to eat healthier. During a 2015 interview with the zine ‘toofab,’ Lisa said that wearing her Martian Girl wardrobe for Mars Attacks! was kind of a nightmare; with the dress being so tight, she had to be sewn into it, and the huge wig/fake beehive really heavy. That same production, Sarah Jessica Parker’s character Nathalie Lake’s pet Chihuahua, was actually owned by Lisa at the time. The actress and director originally adopted the dog after finding it as a stray wandering the streets of Tokyo, Japan while they were traveling.

Though they were engaged for the vast majority of their relationship, Tim and Lisa never officially made it down the aisle, and just lived together. During the filming of Planet of the Apes, it was ‘rumored’ Tim began a secret affair with Helena Bonham Carter right as both of them were working opposite Lisa on set.

In 2015, Marie starred in the horror film We Are Still Here with Barbara Crampton, Andrew Sensenig, Larry Fessenden, Monte Markham, and Susan Gibney. This film was shot in Palmyra and Shortsville, New York.

== Personal life ==
Born Lisa Marie Smith, legally and professionally her name is Lisa Marie. Marie met film director Tim Burton on New Year's Eve in 1992, when she had just finished modeling for Calvin Klein. They were engaged from 1993 to 2001 and she appeared in most of the productions he made during this time.

Burton ended their relationship following the premiere of 2001's Planet of the Apes, which he directed. Marie had a role in the film as did Helena Bonham Carter who Burton began an affair with during the filming.

== Filmography ==
Year	Title	Role	Notes
1988	Let's Get Lost	Herself	
1990	Alice	Office Xmas Party Guest	
1994	Ed Wood	Vampira	
1996	Mars Attacks!	Martian Girl	
1997	Breast Men	Vanessa	
1998	Frogs for Snakes	Myrna L'Hatsky	
1999	Tail Lights Fade	Kitty	
1999	Sleepy Hollow	Lady Crane	
1999	If... Dog... Rabbit...	Judy	
2000	Chasing the Dragon	Claire Oberon	
2000	The Beatnicks	Sophie	
2000	Stainboy	Voice of Match Girl / Stainboy's Mother / Cracker Girl	
2001	Planet of the Apes	Nova	
2003	Starring		Short film by fashion designer Jeremy Scott
2008	Secret World of Superfans	Herself	
2012	The Lords of Salem	Priscilla Reed	
2012	Silent Night	Mrs. Morwood	
2015	We Are Still Here	May Lewis	
2015	Dominion	Tonjura	
2015	Tales of Halloween	Victorian Widow	"Grim Grinning Ghost" segment

== TV appearances ==
- General Hospital, Jennifer Smith #1 1979–1980
- Miami Vice, Cinder – in the episode "Baseballs of Death" (1988)
- Showbiz Today, herself – in the episode dated December 12, 1996
- The Howard Stern Radio Show, herself – in the episode dated December 11, 1999
- Exposure, herself as presenter (2000–2001)
