= Max Ryan =

British actor and former motocross racer (born 1967)

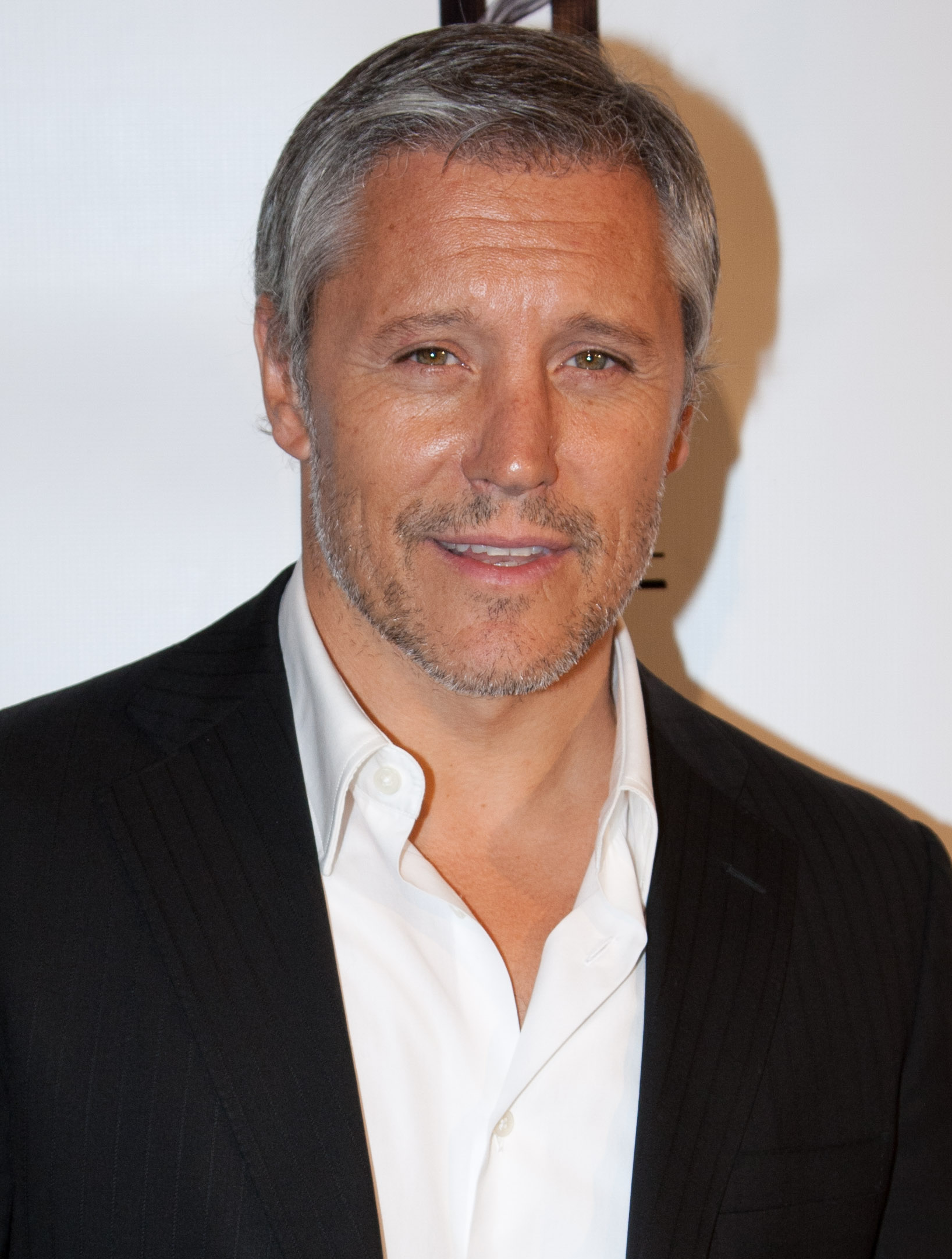
- Ryan in 2012
- Born: February 21, 1967 (age 59); England, UK
- Years active: 1998–present

Other information
- Occupation: Actor, motocross racer
- Website: www.maxryan.eu

Max Ryan (born 2 January 1967 in the North of England) is a British actor and former motocross racer. After a near-death experience in motocross he eventually turned to acting. After some lesser supporting roles in famous British soap operas and a resident personality on a popular 1990s British game show, The Price is Right, he landed a role in the Jet Li action film Kiss of the Dragon. His performance led to other opportunities such as co-starring with Steven Seagal as the main villain in The Foreigner as well as appearing in The League of Extraordinary Gentlemen. Later roles include a villain in Jason Statham's Death Race and a supporting role in Sex and the City 2.

== Filmography ==
| Year | Title | Role |
|---|---|---|
| 2001 | Kiss of the Dragon | Lupo |
| 2003 | Craven Marsh | Craven Marsh |
| 2003 | The Foreigner | Dunoir |
| 2003 | The League of Extraordinary Gentlemen | Dante |
| 2006 | Thr3e | Milton |
| 2007 | The Box | Jack Taggart |
| 2008 | Death Race | Pachenko |
| 2009 | Dark Moon Rising | Darkman/Bender |
| 2010 | Dry Run | James |
| 2010 | Sex and the City 2 | Rikard Spirt |
| 2012 | A Dark Day's Night | Max |
| 2013 | Blackline: The Beirut Contract | Miller |
| 2013 | The Rogue | Bertrand |
| 2013 | Double Fault | Nick Halladay |
| 2014 | Rage | Kane |
| 2015 | Winter Dragon (pilot) | Lews Therin Telamon |
| 2015 | Chain of Command | Lt. Ross |
| 2016 | USS Indianapolis: Men of Courage | Wilbur "Chuck" Gwinn |
| 2016 | Best Fake Friends | Mark Dillon |
| 2018 | First Timers | Drake |
| 2019 | Undateable John | Mr. Tate |
