= Driven (2001 film) =

Film by Renny Harlin

- Theatrical release poster
- Directed by: Renny Harlin
- Screenplay by: Sylvester Stallone
- Story by: Jan Skrentny; Neal Tabachnick
- Produced by: Renny Harlin; Elie Samaha; Sylvester Stallone
- Starring: Sylvester Stallone; Burt Reynolds; Kip Pardue; Til Schweiger; Gina Gershon; Estella Warren; Cristián de la Fuente
- Cinematography: Mauro Fiore
- Edited by: Steve Gilson; Stuart Levy
- Music by: BT
- Production company: Franchise Pictures
- Distributed by: Warner Bros. Pictures
- Release date: April 27, 2001
- Running time: 117 minutes
- Country: United States
- Language: English
- Budget: $72–$94 million
- Box office: $54.7 million

Driven is a 2001 American sports action film directed by Renny Harlin and starring Sylvester Stallone, who also wrote and produced.

The film centers on young racing driver Jimmy Bly's effort to win the CART FedEx Championship Series auto racing championship. Prior to production, Stallone was seen at many Formula One races, but he was unable to procure enough information about the category due to the secrecy with which teams protect their cars, so he decided to base the film on the Championship Auto Racing Teams (CART) racing series.

Released on April 27, 2001, by Warner Bros. Pictures, Driven received generally negative reviews from critics and was a commercial failure. Stallone includes Driven in his list of movies he has regretted making.

== Plot ==
Halfway through an alternate 2000 CART FedEx Championship Series, rookie sensation Jimmy Bly has already won five races. His success has drawn the ire of the defending champion and current points leader Beau Brandenburg, who believes he is not doing as well as he should because of his fiancée Sophia Simone becoming "a distraction". Beau breaks up their engagement and regains his winning streak at Chicago.

As Beau returns to form, Jimmy's paraplegic team owner Carl Henry is concerned that he is making more driving errors. He sees parallels to his former driver and Champ Car champion, Joe Tanto, whom he convinces to come out of retirement to mentor Jimmy. Joe agrees and is brought in to replace teammate Memo Moreno. Joe's ex-wife Cathy Heguy is now married to Memo. Despite all this, Joe and Memo are still friends. Meanwhile, Sophia meets Jimmy at a bar, and they begin to form a bond with each other.

In Canada, Jimmy leads and Beau is a close second. Jimmy cannot pull away from him, so Carl orders Joe to pit and holds him there until the leaders are about to come by, despite Joe's protests. Joe leaves the pit just in time to block out Beau, allowing Jimmy to win the race. Jimmy's brother/business manager Demille takes a dislike to Joe's mentoring, implying that Joe should just act as a blocker. Joe urges Beau to reconcile with Sophia, while Jimmy's growing bond with her causes him to further lose his form on the track during the next race in Japan, where he crashes.

At a party in Chicago, where the prototypes of the next season's cars are being introduced, Beau and Sophia reconcile, much to Jimmy's disappointment. Sophia apologizes to Jimmy, who lashes out at her and Beau, then takes one of the new cars and races it out of the convention center. Joe hops into another of the new cars and chases Jimmy down the streets, eventually calming him down.

In the coming race in Germany, Carl decides to reinstate Memo while making Joe mentor Jimmy from the pit lane. The next race begins in the middle of the rain, with Jimmy and Beau once again fighting it out for first. Jimmy needs one more win to take the championship, and Memo is instructed to block for him and keep out of his way. However, Cathy convinces Memo to go for the win, and as a result, he collides with Jimmy and sends him flying into a lake on the far end of the course. Jimmy and Beau dive into the lake and rescue Memo just as a burning tree collapses and ignites the car's leaking fuel, causing an explosion. This event causes Beau to warm up to Jimmy, saying that he is a good man and that he did not want to win the championship this way.

Angered that Jimmy has sacrificed his championship hopes to rescue another racer, Carl decides to replace him with Beau for the coming season and negotiates a deal with Demille, who will now represent Beau. Demille tries to get Beau to sign the new contract, but he rips it up and Sophia punches Demille in the face for the way he previously treated her. Initially, Jimmy is barred from competing due to a foot injury he sustained during the rescue, but Carl eventually decides to clear him for the race after he passes Carl's strength test. Jimmy thanks both Sophia and Beau for refusing his brother's deal.

At the season finale in Detroit, Jimmy and Beau contend for the championship. With Memo now hospitalized, Joe races again as Jimmy's teammate. In the final laps, Joe takes the lead but damages his front suspension by avoiding a crash, preventing him from contending for the win. In the final lap, Jimmy starts to have a mental lapse, but upon hearing Joe's words, he pulls ahead of Beau by just some inches and crosses the line first, while Joe's spinning car crosses in third. In front of a crowd of spectators, including Sophia and Demille, who shows he is proud of his brother, Jimmy is named the new champion and he celebrates his victory with Joe and Beau.

== Cast ==
- Sylvester Stallone as Joe "The Hummer" Tanto, a veteran Champ Car driver and Indy 500 champion fresh out of retirement, driving the No. 17 Nextel Reynard 2KI-Mercedes car for PacWest Racing
- Burt Reynolds as Carl Henry, team owner of PacWest
- Kip Pardue as James Roman "Jimmy" Bly, a coquettish and constantly pressured rookie driving the No. 18 Motorola Reynard 2KI-Mercedes car for PacWest
- Til Schweiger as Beau Brandenburg, defending champion and Jimmy's rival who drives the No. 1 Target Lola B2K/00-Toyota car for Chip Ganassi Racing
- Estella Warren as Sophia Simone, Beau's ex-girlfriend turned Jimmy's love interest
- Cristián de la Fuente as Memo Moreno, Jimmy's initial teammate at PacWest
- Gina Gershon as Cathy Heguy Moreno, Memo's and formerly Tanto's wife
- Robert Sean Leonard as Demille Bly, Jimmy's brother
- Stacy Edwards as Lucretia "Luc" Jones
- Brent Briscoe as Crusher
- Renny Harlin as Replacement Driver
- Frank Blanch as Bill
- Barry Stillwell as Bob
- Verona Pooth as Nina
- Jasmin Wagner as Ingrid
- Alison Armitage as Girlfriend (uncredited)

Cameo appearances

- Mario Andretti as himself
- Jacques Villeneuve as himself
- Juan Pablo Montoya as himself
- Jean Alesi as himself
- Adrian Fernandez as himself
- Mark Blundell as himself
- Roberto Moreno as himself
- Kenny Bräck as himself
- Tony Kanaan as himself
- Maurício Gugelmin as himself
- Max Papis as himself
- Memo Gidley as himself
- Paul Tracy as himself
- Dario Franchitti as himself
- Alex Barron as himself
- Michel Jourdain Jr. as himself (in a deleted scene)
- Christian Fittipaldi as himself (credited as "Race Car Driver")

Montoya, Gugelmin and Blundell lent their car and helmet likeness to Brandenburg, Tanto and Bly, respectively, with Blundell's helmet being suitably changed from an "MB" logo to "JB". Team Penske, with two drivers, Hélio Castroneves and Gil de Ferran, and team owner Roger Penske, was originally to be featured in the film, but they were removed when it was learned Penske was moving his team to the rival Indy Racing League series.

== Production ==
=== Development and writing ===
Sylvester Stallone became interested in the world of racing while making Judge Dredd in Europe, and decided to make a film with that backdrop. He had originally intended to make a film based on Formula One, attending the 1997 Italian Grand Prix and stating his goal in a press conference. However, the plan was subsequently dropped.

Stallone said he wrote about twenty-five drafts.

And of those, about 20 were about this one man's journey, myself, through this film, and all his trials and tribulations. He'd fallen from a great height career-wise. He was a drunkard with all these problems and accidents because he and his wife Cathy, who's played by Gina Gershon, had this very tumultuous relationship. (Laughs) I'm giving you a little biographical hint here. And he just started to come apart. So he was brought back as kind of like how people should never be. It's like taking kids who are truants and then taking them to prison to see where they'll end up and scaring them straight. So I was brought back to basically prove to young Jimmy Bly how he should never be, as a bad example. And then the more we worked on it, it became the dark side, a little seedy, and I didn't know where the upside of it was ever going to be. So we began to reduce his role and make it more of an ensemble, so he's just there as a guy who did his job, wasn't very spectacular, would race like hell, sometimes he'd win, sometimes lose, but he had a certain work ethic code, that old school that could be applied to Jimmy. So that all made it more ensemble, and then in the editing we reduced it even more. I originally had a relationship going with the reporter. But that began to de-emphasise the other people, so we put that on the back burner... So we did shoot it but it we said, "Nah, it's not really flying."

Stallone said the film was autobiographical in a lot of ways.

Racing's very much like the world of acting. You have your front runners and you have guys that are there for the long race, and you have other guys that block for other people, that are called supporting and character actors. It's all the same kind of situation. And you realize that you can't always be No. 1. You just can't be the guy in front all the time. So what you can do is lend support to, and help and nourish and encourage someone else. So it's like your experiences live on in someone else. If you can find some young actor and you can say, 'Listen, don't do this and don't do that and avoid this and that,' and share your experiences, and he does succeed, you can say, 'You know what, I kind of contributed to that.' As an actor did you have to learn you can't always be No.1 the hard way? (Laughs) Unfortuantely [sic] I did

Stallone says it took four years to get the finance to make the film. Stallone and Renny Harlin had previously worked together on Cliffhanger. Harlin had been trying to develop a film on the life of Ayrton Senna, and when that fell through, he signed on to make Driven.

=== Filming ===
The film was shot primarily in Toronto, Canada, from July 6, 2000 (Stallone's 55th birthday) until October 12, 2000, as well as at a variety of worldwide races that were sanctioned by CART. The German race was filmed at the Continental test track in Hanover rather than the Lausitzring oval that was actually used by CART. When Stallone's character Joe Tanto arrives at a race early in the film, there's a long shot of him walking in, saying hello to various people. One very brief uncredited cameo contains Dustin Hoffman in racing gear.

=== Post-production ===
Matt Hullum of Rooster Teeth Productions fame was the visual effects producer. The film premiere took place at Grauman's Chinese Theatre, with several CART competitors driving and demonstrating pit stops in modified Champ Cars down Hollywood Blvd. According to director Harlin's commentary, his first cut was four hours long. 51 minutes of deleted footage was included as special feature on DVD.

== Home media ==
Driven was released on DVD and VHS on September 18, 2001.

== Video game ==
A video game, Driven, based on the film, was released in 2001 for the Game Boy Advance, GameCube and PlayStation 2.

== Reception ==
=== Box office ===
Driven was a commercial failure, and grossed only $32 million against a $72 million budget. This poor performance ended a modestly successful recovery (with 1999 film Deep Blue Sea and 1996 film The Long Kiss Goodnight) from director Harlin's critical and financial failure Cutthroat Island in 1995. However, it was Stallone's first #1 opening film since Cop Land in 1997.

=== Critical response ===
On the review aggregator website Rotten Tomatoes, 14% of 111 critics' reviews are positive, with an average rating of 3.6/10. The website's consensus reads: "Underdeveloped characters, silly plot dynamics, and obvious CG effects." Metacritic, which uses a weighted average, assigned the film a score of 29 out of 100, based on 26 critics, indicating "generally unfavorable" reviews. Audiences polled by CinemaScore gave the film an average grade of "B−" on an A+ to F scale.

Roger Ebert of the Chicago Sun-Times said Harlin "has made better pictures [...] but delivers the goods here". Ebert was critical of the editing, the lack of character conflict and the all too happy ending. He gave it 2.5 out of 4. Entertainment Weekly's Owen Gleiberman called it "Mostly preposterous, and it has no dramatic center, but the racing scenes hold you in their death-trip grip" and gave it a grade C+. Kenneth Turan of the Los Angeles Times wrote: "Harlin's skill compensates for a lot of narrative preposterousness, even it is overmatched this time around." Jay Bogar of The Orlando Sentinel said, "Driven, to put it bluntly, makes Days of Thunder look like Citizen Kane on Wheels." Mike Clark of USA Today described it as "a race-car drama full of flashy but empty images and a soundtrack that makes you feel as if you're being shaken on a motel rumblebed."

When Jay Leno appeared as a guest critic on the television show At the Movies, both Leno and Richard Roeper described Driven as the worst car film ever made, and a terrible depiction of auto racing. Stallone has said he regrets making the film. In a Reddit interview, director Renny Harlin reflected critically on Driven, describing the film as a "sum of many parts" and acknowledging that "there were too many chefs in the kitchen." He noted that the project suffered from creative interference and shifting directions: "The plot and the characters changed several times and ultimately I wasn't very happy with the result myself." Originally conceived as a Formula 1 story, the film had to be restructured when that plan fell through. Despite being a lifelong motorsports fan with personal experience in racing cars and boats, Harlin admitted that the production lacked cohesion and direction. Summing up the experience, he concluded: "The lesson I learned is 'don't ever make a movie for the wrong reasons.'"

=== Accolades ===
The film earned seven nominations at the 22nd Golden Raspberry Awards, including Worst Picture, Worst Director, Worst Screenplay, Worst Screen Couple (Burt Reynolds and Stallone) and twice for Worst Supporting Actor (Reynolds and Stallone), with Estella Warren winning Worst Supporting Actress (also for Planet of the Apes).
