= Robert Miranda (actor) =

American film and television actor (born 1952)

- Born: Robert Guy Miranda; April 10, 1952 (age 74); New Orleans, Louisiana, U.S.
- Occupations: Film and television actor
- Years active: 1983–present

Robert Guy Miranda (born April 10, 1952) is an American film and television actor. He is perhaps best known for playing the mobster Joey in the 1988 film Midnight Run.

== Partial filmography ==
- 1985: The A-Team (Double episode 4x01 and 4x02)
- 1986: Inside Out as Sal
- 1987: The Untouchables as Gunned Head
- 1987: Highway to Heaven: Fight for Your Life as Jerry Zadan
- 1987: The Living Daylights as Pushkin's Hitman (uncredited)
- 1988: Midnight Run as Joey
- 1989: Miami Vice - TV series, episodio 5x12 "Jack of All Trades" (1989)
- 1990: My Blue Heaven as Lilo Mello
- 1990: Sons as Fred
- 1991: The Rocketeer as Spanish Johnny (as Robert Guy Miranda)
- 1992: Sister Act as Joey
- 1993: Lost in Yonkers as Hollywood Harry (as Robert Guy Miranda)
- 1993: Desire as Nick Palermo
- 1994: Huck and the King of Hearts as Happy
- 1994: Monkey Trouble as Drake
- 1995: Heat as Cusmano (uncredited)
- 1996: For Which He Stands as Johnny's Lawyer
- 1996: Eraser as Frediano
- 1996: Judge and Jury as Coach Wagner
- 1996: Gotti as Frank Decicco
- 1996: The Devil Takes a Holiday as Vinnie Grannucci
- 1997: Steel Sharks as Gregorov
- 1998: Black Thunder as Rojar
- 1998: The Rat Pack as Sam Giancana
- 1999: Blue Streak as Glennfidish
- 1999: Scriptfella's as Leo
- 2000: Thirteen Days as RFK's Driver
- 2001: Cowboy Up as Eddie (as Robert G. Miranda)
- 2002: Virginia's Run as Blake Raines (as Robert Guy Miranda)
- 2002: Deuces Wild as Gino
- 2004: Target as Officer D'Angelo
- 2004: The Last Letter as Mr. Pickett
- 2016: The Unlikely's as Buck Cringle
- 2017: Pizza with Bullets as Louis Parchessi
- 2017: Proximity to Power
