= A Murder of Crows (film) =

- DVD cover
- Directed by: Rowdy Herrington
- Written by: Rowdy Herrington
- Produced by: Cuba Gooding Jr.; Elie Samaha; Ashok Amritraj
- Starring: Cuba Gooding Jr.; Tom Berenger; Marianne Jean-Baptiste; Mark Pellegrino; Eric Stoltz
- Cinematography: Robert Primes
- Edited by: Harry B. Miller III
- Music by: Steve Porcaro
- Production company: Franchise Pictures
- Distributed by: Sterling Home Entertainment
- Release dates: December 12, 1998 (United Kingdom); July 6, 1999 (United States)
- Running time: 101 minutes
- Country: United States
- Language: English
- Budget: $7.5 million

A Murder of Crows is a 1998 American psychological thriller film written and directed by Rowdy Herrington and starring Cuba Gooding Jr. and Tom Berenger. It was released in the United Kingdom on December 12, 1998, and in the United States on July 6, 1999.

== Plot ==
Lawson Russell is a New Orleans criminal defense lawyer who has had a crisis of conscience while defending wealthy childhood friend Thurman Parks III. Parks denies charges of the rape and murder of stripper Jeanie Brussard. Russell is involved with Parks' and Judge Wiley Banning's conspiracy to have the charges dismissed. Russell, however, knowing Thurman is guilty, attempts to recuse himself from the case. Judge Banning refuses to accept Russell's recusal and threatens to end his career. Russell enters court and accuses Parks, resulting in a mistrial. Judge Banning has Russell disbarred for life.

13 months later, Russell has retired to Key West as a fishing guide and decides to write a book about his experience. He suffers from perpetual writer's block. He befriends Christopher Marlowe, a widower and retired teacher who asks him to read his manuscript. Attempting to return the manuscript, Russell encounters Detective Goethe, who informs Russell that Marlowe has died leaving no next of kin. Russell decides to pass the book off as his own. It becomes a huge success, giving Russell fame and a luxurious lifestyle. Russell begins a sexual relationship with his book's publisher, Janine DeVrie.

Detective Clifford Dubose receives a copy of Russell's book from an anonymous sender and realizes that the murders in the book are identical to the real-life deaths of 5 attorneys that were written off as accidents or suicides. Russell is arrested and charged with the murder of the attorneys. He hires his former colleague Elizabeth Pope to defend him and tells her about Marlowe and the manuscript. She doesn't believe him and drops him as a client. Dubose searches Russell's home and finds hidden pictures of all the dead attorneys. Russell realizes he is being framed and goes on the run.

Russell follows a clue to Parks' home and breaks in to investigate. He discovers that Parks is seeing Janine. Another clue leads him to the home of Professor Arthur Corvus, where he discovers a room full of costumes and prosthetic face masks. Russell realizes that Marlowe, Goethe and even a random fan at his book signing were all Corvus. He concludes that Corvus murdered the lawyers. Corvus' housekeeper Althea Delroy discovers Russell and calls the police. Dubose arrives and questions Corvus, who denies ever meeting or knowing Russell but Dubose is suspicious.

Russell digs into Corvus' background and discovers that 3 years earlier, Corvus' wife Jean and daughter Trudy had been killed in a hit-and-run accident by a banker, whose lawyer, Jeffery Lowell, got him off on a technicality. Russell returns to Corvus' home and confronts him. Corvus, armed, takes Russell's gun and admits to killing Lowell and the other attorneys for misuse of the justice system. He also says that he was going to kill Russell the night he attempted to recuse himself. Corvus became intrigued by Russell's struggling conscience and decided to test him.

Overhearing Corvus' confession, Dubose interrupts and takes Corvus' gun. As Dubose calls for backup, Corvus kills Dubose with Russell's gun. Russell wrestles Corvus for both guns. Realizing that the police and courts would not believe that Corvus was the real murderer, Russell, having both guns, uses one to kill Corvus as the police arrive. Pope visits Russell to discuss his court strategy and hires a well-known attorney for him. Russell is found not guilty on all charges. The publicity of the case then results in the skyrocketing sales of the novel, making Russell a millionaire.

== Cast ==
- Cuba Gooding Jr. as Lawson Russell
- Tom Berenger as Detective Clifford Dubose
- Marianne Jean-Baptiste as Elizabeth Pope
- Mark Pellegrino as Professor Arthur Corvus
- Eric Stoltz as Thurman Parks III
- Ashley Laurence as Janine DeVrie
- Doug Wert as Billy Ray Richardson
- Carmen Argenziano as Judge Wiley Banning
- Renée Estevez as Reporter
- Ellen Gerstein as Landlady
- Jim Meskimen as Salesman
- Lochlyn Munro as Norwood
- Robert Peters as Desk Sergeant
- Deneen Tyler as Althea Delroy

== Production ==
Filming began in December 1997, across Key West, Florida, Los Angeles, California, and New Orleans, Louisiana.

== Reception ==
On the review aggregator website Rotten Tomatoes, 0% of five critics' reviews are positive, with an average rating of 4.4/10.
