= David L. Lindsey =

American novelist

- Born: 1944 (age 81–82); Kingsville, Texas, U.S.
- Education: North Texas State University
- Occupation: Novelist
- Spouse: Joyce Lindsey
- Children: 2
- Writing career
- Period: 1983–present
- Genres: Mystery, Crime fiction, Spy fiction
- Notable work: Mercy (1990)
- Website: www.davidlindsey.com

David L. Lindsey (born 1944) is an American novelist, working primarily in the mystery and crime fiction genres. He has published fourteen novels in a writing career spanning 29 years.

== Biography ==
Lindsey was born in Kingsville, Texas, in 1944. He spent his childhood in the Texas Rio Grande Valley and in West Texas, near San Angelo. He graduated from North Texas State University with a degree in English literature. He moved to Austin, Texas, in 1970 and has lived there ever since.

During the 1970s, Lindsey worked as a book editor at a number of small publishing houses in Austin. At one point he operated his own publishing firm, Heidelberg Publishers.

During his years in publishing, Lindsey had an interest in writing, but felt it would be fiscally "irresponsible". Finally, in 1980 his wife urged him to "go for it". Lindsey decided to write mystery fiction because of its general marketability. His first two novels appeared in 1983: Black Gold, Red Death and A Cold Mind. The latter work introduced Houston homicide detective Stuart Haydon, a cultured, independently wealthy protagonist who appeared in four subsequent novels.

By 1994 Lindsey had over two million books in print. By 2004, his novels had been translated into 20 languages. His 1990 novel Mercy was adapted into a movie - also called Mercy - in 2000.

== Novels ==
- Black Gold, Red Death (1983)
- A Cold Mind (1983) – a Stuart Haydon novel
- Heat from Another Sun (1984) – a Stuart Haydon novel
- Spiral (1986) – a Stuart Haydon novel
- In the Lake of the Moon (1988) – a Stuart Haydon novel
- Mercy (1990)
- Body of Truth (1992) – a Stuart Haydon novel
- An Absence of Light (1994)
- Requiem for a Glass Heart (1996)
- The Color of Night (1999)
- Animosity (2001)
- The Rules of Silence (2003)
- The Face of the Assassin (2004)
- Pacific Heights (2011) (under the pen name Paul Harper)
