= Night Eyes 4: Fatal Passion =

- Film poster
- Directed by: Rodney McDonald
- Written by: John Eubank; Henry Krinkle
- Story by: Andrew Stevens
- Produced by: Ashok Amritraj; Andrew Stevens
- Starring: Jeff Trachta; Paula Barbieri; Andrew Stevens; Casper Van Dien
- Cinematography: Gary Graver
- Edited by: W. Peter Miller
- Music by: Patrick Seymour
- Distributed by: Lions Gate Entertainment
- Release date: 1996
- Country: United States
- Language: English

Night Eyes 4: Fatal Passion is a 1996 erotic thriller film directed by Rodney McDonald. It is the fourth film in the Night Eyes series. Like the previous films, it stars Andrew Stevens as security expert Will Griffith.

== Synopsis ==
Dr. Angela Cross (Paula Barbieri), a successful psychologist, receives threats and decides to install a new security alarm system in her home. Security specialists Will Griffith and Steve Cowell are invited to install the system.

After installation, Will is injured during a break-in attempt. A romantic relationship develops between Steve and Angela. Meanwhile, new attempts are made to break into Angela's house, and soon secrets from her past begin to surface, which could be exposed if the stolen records fall into the wrong hands.

The film's plot revolves around the mystery of threats and intrigue in Angela's life, interspersed with elements of sexual tension and danger.

== Cast ==
- Paula Barbieri as Dr. Angela Cross
- Jeff Trachta as Steve Caldwell
- Andrew Stevens as Will Griffith
- Casper Van Dien as Roy

== Future ==
The film was featured in the 2023 documentary We Kill For Love by Anthony Penta.
