= H. R. Poindexter =

American theatre lighting designer (1937–1977)

H. R. Poindexter (December 16, 1937 – September 24, 1977) was an American theatre lighting designer and set designer. He designed many Broadway productions and received a Tony Award for Best Lighting Design in 1971 for his work on Paul Sills' Story Theatre. He was the father of Larry Poindexter.

Poindexter died of a heart attack at his home in Los Angeles, on September 24, 1977, at the age of 39.
