= Final Examination (film) =

- Film poster
- Directed by: Fred Olen Ray (as Ed Raymond)
- Written by: Sean O'Bannon; Kimberly A. Ray
- Produced by: Hugh Jorgan; Albert Pyun; Andrew Stevens; Jim Valdez
- Starring: Kari Wührer; Brent Huff; Debbie Rochon; Amy Lindsay
- Cinematography: Theo Angell
- Edited by: Sabastian James
- Music by: Thomas Barquee; Steve Gurevitch; David Wurst; Eric Wurst
- Production company: Royal Oaks Entertainment (presents)
- Distributed by: Artisan Entertainment
- Release date: January 3, 2003
- Running time: 98 minutes
- Country: United States
- Language: English

Final Examination is a 2003 American erotic horror thriller film which was directed by Fred Olen Ray (credited as Ed Raymond) and stars Kari Wührer, Brent Huff and Debbie Rochon.

== Plot ==
A police officer Shane Newman fails in capturing a drug dealer in Los Angeles, so his boss Hugh Janus transfers him to Hawaii for disciplinary reasons. On the island some former female students are just gathering in a luxury hotel. The young ladies once belonged to the sorority "Omega Kappa Omega" and are now invited to an erotic photo shoot which is organised by Derek Simmons, the editor of the Cavalier Magazine. Shortly after their arrival, Terri Walker, one of the former students, is strangled in the pool while her friend William Culp is absent for some minutes. Detective Newman begins to investigate the murder together with his new colleague Julie Seska and the coroner Ferguson. Next to Terri's corpse they find a document which resembles a final examination certificate and has the imprint "Failed" on it. William tells them to observe Derek Simmons very closely.

In the following night, the next student dies. Amanda Calvin is lured outside to the pool by a phone call and falls victim to the unknown murderer. Later the cops find William in the hotel room of the student Megan Davidson, who also belongs to the group. They just had sex and now they are questioned. The cops get to know the background of the series of murders. Five years ago, Rachel Kincaid committed suicide by falling from a bridge in her car. At that time she was the favourite for the election of the sorority's speaker, but she was mobbed by her competitor Kristen Neal, who is also present in Hawaii now.

After Newman and Seska have clarified these connections, William wants to inform them about something. But before Newman meets him, the young man is killed by the murderer and can only indicate that there is some problem with Rachel. Newman again gets in contact with his colleague Rita in Los Angeles, who had already provided him with the file about Rachel, and asks for Simmons. Rita gets to know that the editor of the magazine is actually called James Derek Kincaid and that he is Rachel's brother. He has gathered the students in the hotel to take revenge for his sister's death.

Megan and Kristen, who are the only surviving people among the invited students, meet at the hotel room. It is the fifth anniversary of Rachel's suicide. Kristen suspects Megan and threatens her with a pistol. Suddenly the lights go out and she forces Megan to go into the hallway where she runs across the murderer. Kristen is able to expel the killer, but accidentally shoots at Seska. Newman just arrives in time to stop the killer who really proves to be Simmons alias Kincaid.

With the help of a photo, the detective realises that the case is not yet complete. As he has been intimate with the photographer Tayler Cameron before he recognizes her necklace. She is a sister of Rachel and Derek. Now she overwhelms Kristen and threatens to strangle her. When Newman intervenes, she escapes to a rock over the pool. She stabs a knife in her body and falls down into the water. The cop just wants to announce the next corpse, but she attacks him. Newman shoots Taylor in self-defense.

At the same time his colleagues in Los Angeles arrest professor Andrews, who was not only Rachel's study adviser, but also impregnated his student before she died. When they arrive at the police station, the cop Sam reveals to be another brother of Rachel. He shoots the professor.

== Cast ==
- Kari Wührer as Julie Seska
- Brent Huff as Shane Newman
- Debbie Rochon as Taylor Cameron
- Amy Lindsay as Kristen Neal
- Belinda Gavin as Megan Davidson
- Ted Monte as Sam Kincaid
- Jim Valdez as Detective James
- Richard Gabai as Ferguson
- Marc Vahanian as Detective Marks
- Kathy Cullis as Miss Pratt
- Robert Donovan as Professor Andrews
- Kalau Iwaoka as Amanda Galvin
- Michael Lloyd as Charlie Wilson
- Kim Maddox as Terri Walker
- Bill Langlois Monroe as Drug Dealer
- Winton Nicholson as Derek Simmons
- Jen Nikolaisen as Rachel Kincaid
- Tom Penny as Riley
- Jay Richardson as Hugh Janus
- Jade Rutane-Babey as Rita
- Jason Schnuit as William Culp

== Production ==
It was shot in the United States in summer 2002 in Hawaii and on Hawaii Kai in Honolulu in O'ahu. The slasher film was a Royal Oaks Entertainment presentation and directed by Fred Olen Ray (credited as Ed Raymond), as producers worked Hugh Jorgan, James Valdez. The film based on a screenplay from the writers Sean O'Bannon and Kimberly A. Ray.

Fred Olen Ray says there were two versions, one adult, and one for the family market. Andrew Stevens played a role in the family version, in order to maintain his Screen Actors Guild health insurance. Jay Richardson played the role (a detective) in the adult version.

== Soundtrack ==
The score was composed by Thomas Barquee, record producer Steve Gurevitch and the brothers David Wurst and Eric Wurst.

== Release ==
The film premiered on 3 January 2003 as direct to video production. It was published and distributed by Artisan Home Entertainment in Santa Monica, California.

== Reception ==
A review at Medium found that "This movie was like traveling in a time machine to the late ’80s or early ’90s when Fred Olen Ray was making this kind of entertaining, shitty schlock." Another commentator lamented: "f only Final Examination had the same patina of joyful sleaze of other Fred Olen Ray films, then it may have been redeemed; when Fred Olen Ray directs under a pseudonym, however- he’s “Ed Raymond” here- one should take that as a sign of what’s to come."

== See also ==
- Final Exam, a 1981 horror film with a similar title
