= Mercy (2000 film) =

- DVD cover artwork
- Directed by: Damian Harris
- Written by: David L. Lindsey (original novel); Damian Harris (screenplay)
- Produced by: Amedeo Ursini; Elie Samaha; Andrew Stevens
- Starring: Ellen Barkin; Wendy Crewson; Peta Wilson; Julian Sands; Marshall Bell
- Music by: BC Smith
- Production company: Franchise Pictures
- Distributed by: New City Releasing (United States); Sapphire Media International (International)
- Release date: February 11, 2000
- Running time: 94 minutes (R-rated version); 117 minutes (Unrated Edition)
- Country: United States
- Language: English

Mercy is a 2000 erotic thriller film directed by Damian Harris and starring Ellen Barkin. The movie was based on a novel written by David L. Lindsey.

== Plot ==
Detective Cathy Palmer (Ellen Barkin) is on the trail of an elusive serial killer. During her investigation she meets Vickie Kittrie (Peta Wilson), who belongs to an exclusive club of women who engage in secret sessions of bondage and S&M. Matters become even more complicated when Palmer finds herself attracted to Kittrie, leading to a brief lesbian encounter. Palmer soon learns that each victim belonged to this club of prominent, sexually experimental women. In order to catch the killer, Catherine must trust Vickie to guide her through the dangerous and illicit underground.

== Cast ==
- Ellen Barkin as Detective Cathy Palmer
- Wendy Crewson as Bernadine Mello
- Peta Wilson as Vickie Kittrie
- Karen Young as Mary
- Danielle Marie Straus as Young Mary
- Julian Sands as Dr. Dominick Broussard
- Stephen Baldwin as The Mechanic
- Beau Starr as Lieutenant Fritch
- Marshall Bell as Gil Reynolds
- Bill MacDonald as Detective John Beck
- Stewart Bick as Detective Cushing
- Ellen-Ray Hennessy as Murial Farr
- Lara Daans as Dorothy Samenov
- Claire Burton as Sandra Moser
- Fulvio Cecere as Detective Leeland
- Michael Fletcher as Wendell
- Zehra Leverman as Terry Ross
- Linda V. Carter as Helena
- Melanie Nicholls-King as Jane
- Kevin Rushton as Clyde Barbish
- Dorothy Bennie as Miss Dawes
- Doug Lennox as Mr. Kittrie
- Jacqueline McLeod as Mrs. Kittrie
- Lacey Von Erich as Vicki's Sister

== Production ==
Exterior locations include the Filmores Hotel at 212 Dundas Street East at George Street in the Garden District of Toronto.

== Reception ==
The film received poor reviews from critics. The film has an approval rating of 17% on Rotten Tomatoes from six critic reviews.
