= Desperate but Not Serious =

- American DVD cover
- Directed by: Bill Fishman
- Written by: Nicole Coady; Halle Eaton; Abbe Wool
- Produced by: Jim Fishman; Mark McGarry; Jason Villard
- Starring: Christine Taylor; Paget Brewster; Claudia Schiffer; Judy Greer; John Corbett
- Cinematography: W. M. MacCollum
- Music by: Stan Ridgway
- Production company: Franchise Pictures
- Distributed by: 20th Century Fox Home Entertainment
- Release dates: October 12, 1999 (Chicago International Film Festival); May 21, 2002 (United States, DVD)
- Running time: 94 minutes
- Country: United States
- Language: English

Desperate but Not Serious is a 1999 American comedy film directed by Bill Fishman. It was released in the United States under the title Reckless + Wild.

== Plot ==
Out-of-towner Lily (Taylor) arrives in Los Angeles to attend a wedding reception with the man of her dreams, Jonathan (Corbett). Aided by party-girl Frances (Brewster), they embark on a night of adventure after the wedding invitation is lost. Their wild romp through the streets of Hollywood in search of the reception, takes them to club after club—including the trendy "Vapor" Room and even into the home of famous actor Darby Tipp. After being thrown out of parties, terrorized by a psycho bartender, and chased by police it seems Lily will never find her man—or will she?

== Cast ==
- Christine Taylor as Lili
- Paget Brewster as Frances
- Claudia Schiffer as Gigi
- Judy Greer as Molly
- John Corbett as Jonathan
- Max Perlich as Todd
- Joey Lawrence as Darby
- Toledo Diamond as Himself
- Wendie Jo Sperber as Landlady
- Brent Bolthouse as Steve
- Stacy Sanches as Shauna
- John Fleck as Landon Liebowitz
- Zach Tiegan as Justin
- Henry Rollins as Bartender
- Matthew Porretta as Gene
- Sara Melson as Patrice
- Duffy Taylor as Jimmy
- Agnieszka Musiala as Stacy

== Production ==
Claudia Schiffer sang all of the songs performed by her character herself.

Having already had her earlobes pierced shortly beforehand especially for her part in Black & White, Claudia Schiffer had the cartilage in both ears pierced multiple times for her part in this film. She also had her nose and belly button pierced especially for this film. Following the end of filming, she removed all of the piercings (including her earlobes) and allowed them to close up again.
