= Night Eyes 3 =

- Film poster
- Directed by: Andrew Stevens
- Written by: Andrew Stevens; Michel W. Potts
- Produced by: Ashok Amritraj; Andrew Stevens
- Starring: Shannon Tweed; Tracy Tweed; Andrew Stevens
- Cinematography: James Mathers
- Edited by: Terry J. Chiappe
- Music by: Terry Plumeri
- Production company: MDP Worldwide
- Distributed by: Turner Home Entertainment
- Release date: 1993
- Running time: 97 minutes
- Language: English

Night Eyes 3 is a 1993 erotic thriller film directed by Andrew Stevens. It is the third film in the Night Eyes series. Like its predecessor, it stars Andrew Stevens and Shannon Tweed, although the latter plays a different role. It also stars Tweed's sister, Tracy.

== Synopsis ==
Zoe Clairmont (Shannon Tweed), star of the hit TV show "Sweet Justice", is being stalked by her ex-boyfriend. As a result, she hires security expert Will Griffith (Andrew Stevens) to protect her. To make matters worse, Zoe also has to deal with a jealous co-star, while Will has to deal with a rival security agency.

== Cast ==
- Andrew Stevens as Will Griffith
- Shannon Tweed as Zoe Clairmont
- Tracy Tweed as Dana Gray
- Daniel McVicar as Thomas Cassidy (as Dan McVicar)
- Tristan Rogers as Jim Stanton
- Todd Curtis as Dan Everett
- Allison Mack as Natalie
- Richard Portnow as Kaplan
- Marianne Muellerleile as Mrs. O'Brien

== Production ==
Night Eyes 3 was filmed within the period of a month, from November 30, 1992, to December 29, 1992. It was filmed in Los Angeles, California.
