= Night Eyes 2 =

- Film poster
- Directed by: Rodney McDonald
- Written by: Simon Levy; Michel W. Potts
- Story by: Andrew Stevens
- Produced by: Ashok Amritraj; Andrew Stevens
- Starring: Shannon Tweed; Andrew Stevens
- Cinematography: Kent L. Wakeford
- Edited by: David H. Lloyd
- Music by: Timothy Leitch
- Distributed by: Turner Home Entertainment
- Release date: 1992
- Running time: 97 minutes
- Language: English

Night Eyes 2 is a 1992 erotic thriller film directed by Rodney McDonald and starring Andrew Stevens and Shannon Tweed. The film is a sequel to Night Eyes (1990).

== Premise ==
Will Griffith (Andrew Stevens) is hired to secure and protect the mansion of South American diplomat Héctor Mejenes (Richard Chaves), following attempts on his life. However, his wife Marilyn (Shannon Tweed) ends up attracted to Will.

== Cast ==
- Andrew Stevens as Will Griffith
- Shannon Tweed as Marilyn Mejenes
- Richard Chaves as Héctor Mejenes
- Tim Russ as Jesse Younger
- Geno Silva as Luis
- John O'Hurley as Detective Turner
- Julian Stone as Safecracker
- Tessa Taylor as Vivian Talbot

== Production ==
Night Eyes 2 was filmed within a month, starting on April 29, 1991, and finishing on May 25, 1991. It was filmed in Los Angeles, California.
