= Andrew Stevens =

American actor, film producer and director

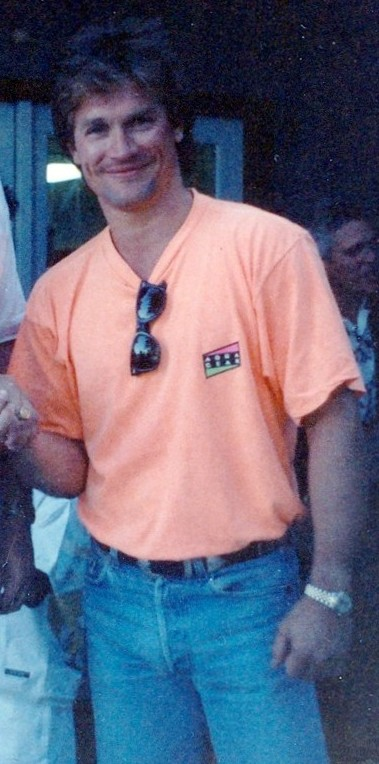
- Stevens in 1994
- Born: Herman Andrew Stephens; June 10, 1955 (age 71); Memphis, Tennessee, U.S.
- Occupations: Executive, film producer, film director, actor
- Years active: 1962–present
- Spouses: Kate Jackson (m. 1978; div. 1982) Robyn Suzanne Scott (m. 1995; div. 2010) Diana Phillips Hoogland (m. 2016; div. 2018)
- Children: 3
- Parent: Stella Stevens
- Website: {{}}

Herman Andrew Stevens (né Stephens; born June 10, 1955) is an American executive, film producer, director and actor.

== Early life ==
Stevens was born in Memphis, Tennessee, the only child of actress Stella Stevens and her former husband Noble Herman Stephens. His mother was 16 when he was born. His parents divorced in 1957. Although he was the only child between Stella & Herman, Andrew has a half sister, 6 years younger than him. They have never met

== Career ==
Prior to his producing career, Stevens was a writer, director, and actor. He made his uncredited film debut in Vincente Minnelli's The Courtship of Eddie's Father (1963), had a bit role in Shampoo (1975), Las Vegas Lady (1975) which he appeared with his mother Stella who starred in the title role, and went on to appear in cult thrillers such as Massacre at Central High (1976), Vigilante Force (1976) and Day of the Animals (1977), as well as the cult horror film The Fury (1978) starring Kirk Douglas. He was nominated for a Golden Globe Award for his performance in The Boys in Company C (1978), and later starred with Charles Bronson in two films, Death Hunt (1981) and 10 to Midnight (1983).

He appeared in the miniseries Once an Eagle (1976) and played 17-year-old Andrew Thorpe on the NBC Western series The Oregon Trail.

Stevens starred in The Bastard (1978) and The Rebels (1979), based on the John Jakes novels. He appeared opposite Dennis Weaver and Susan Dey in the short-lived drama Emerald Point N.A.S., as a playboy/tennis bum in Columbo: Murder in Malibu, and as one of J.R. Ewing's stooges Casey Denault, on Dallas, for two seasons, beginning in 1987. He also played Ted Rorchek in the 1981-82 television series Code Red. He appeared in the miniseries Hollywood Wives (1985). During this time, he also wrote and starred in the erotic thriller Night Eyes (1990) and its sequels.

== Producing ==
In early 1990, Stevens left the public eye to become an independent entrepreneur writing, producing, directing and financing films for his own companies. He was President/CEO of Franchise Pictures, which produced films for Warner Bros. from 1999 through 2005, including The Whole Nine Yards and its sequel, The Whole Ten Yards, as well as The In-Laws.

Franchise and its subsidiaries filed for Chapter 11 bankruptcy on August 19, 2004, after losing a multimillion-dollar fraud case in Los Angeles, and is now defunct.

Prior to Franchise, Stevens was an owner and president of Royal Oaks Entertainment, which produced and/or distributed seventy pictures over a three-year period including many HBO, Showtime and Sci-Fi Channel world premieres. Prior to Royal Oaks, Stevens' entrée into foreign sales and production company ownership was with Sunset Films International, which amassed a library of 19 titles (including seven in-house productions) during his first year as president of the company. He currently operates Andrew Stevens Entertainment and Stevens Entertainment Group.

In 2017, he published a screenwriting manual, Screenwriting for Profit: Writing for the Global Marketplace.

== Personal life ==
Stevens was married to actress Kate Jackson from 1978 to 1982. He has three children by his second marriage to Robyn Suzanne Scott, which ended in divorce in 2010. Stevens married Diana Phillips Hoogland in 2016 and divorced in 2017.

== Acting, directing, and producing credits ==
Year	Title	Role	Notes
1963	The Courtship of Eddie's Father		actor
1973	Adam-12	Rod Foreman	actor in episode "Northwest Division"
1975	Shampoo	Boy #2	
1975	Police Story		actor in episode "The Empty Weapon"
1975	Las Vegas Lady		actor
1976	Massacre at Central High		actor
1976	Vigilante Force		actor
1976	Once an Eagle		actor
1977	Day of the Animals		actor
1978	The Boys in Company C		actor
1978	The Fury		actor
1978	The Bastard		actor
1979	The Rebels		actor
1979	Beggarman, Thief		actor
1981	Death Hunt		actor
1982	The Seduction	Derek Sanford	actor
1983	10 to Midnight	Paul McAnn	actor
1984	Terror in the Aisles		archival footage
1984	Murder, She Wrote	David Tolliver	actor in episode "Lovers and Other Killers"
1985	Hollywood Wives		actor
1987-1989	Dallas		actor
1988	Counterforce		actor
1989	Murder, She Wrote	Dr. Adam Paulson	actor in episode "Double Exposure"
1989	The Terror Within		actor
1989	The Ranch		actor
1990	Columbo	Wayne Jennings	actor in episode "Murder in Malibu"
1990	Night Eyes		writer, actor
1990	Red Blooded American Girl	Owen Augustus Urban III	actor
1991	The Terror Within II	David	actor and director
1992	Night Eyes 2		story writer, actor
1992	Munchie		actor
1993	Night Eyes 3		writer, actor
1994	Illicit Dreams		
1994	Scorned		
1996	Night Eyes 4: Fatal Passion		writer, actor
1997	Steel Sharks		
1997	Inferno		
1997	Crash Dive		
1997	The Shooter		
1997	Scorned 2		
1998	Billy Frankenstein		
1999	Fugitive Mind		
1999	If... Dog... Rabbit...		
1999	The Big Kahuna		producer
2000	Mercy		
2000	Animal Factory		
2002	Stranded		actor
2003	Final Examination		
2004	Method		
2004	Blessed		
2005	Glass Trap		
2005	7 Seconds		
2005	The Marksman		also actor video
2005; video	Black Dawn		also actor
2006	The Detonator		
2007	Walking Tall: The Payback		
2007	Half Past Dead 2		
2007; video	Walking Tall: Lone Justice		also actor
2007	Missionary Man		also actor
2009	Fire from Below		also actor
2010	Mongolian Death Worm		TV – also actor
2010	Mandrake		TV
2010	Breaking the Press		
2011	Rise		
2022	Pursuit	Frank Diego	
