= Deadly Heroes =

1993 film by Menahem Golan

- Canadian poster
- Directed by: Menahem Golan
- Written by: Damian Lee; Gregory Lee; Menahem Golan
- Story by: Menahem Golan (as Joseph Goldman); Damian Lee
- Produced by: Damian Lee
- Starring: Michael Paré; Jan-Michael Vincent; Billy Drago; Claudette Mink; Alon Abutbul
- Cinematography: Avraham Karpick; Yelhiel-Hilik Neeman
- Edited by: Carolle Alain
- Music by: Lawrence Shragge
- Production companies: 21st Century Film Corporation; MDP Inc.
- Distributed by: Cinépix/Famous Players Distribution (Canada)
- Release date: 1993
- Running time: 104 minutes
- Countries: Israel; United States; Canada
- Language: English

Deadly Heroes is a 1993 Israeli–Canadian-American action film directed by Menahem Golan, starring Michael Paré, Jan-Michael Vincent and Billy Drago. Paré stars as a former Navy SEAL trying to rescue his wife from a terrorist group who fled with her to North Africa after he attempted to thwart their attack on a Greek airport. Available date listings suggest that Deadly Heroes was the last 21st Century Film Corporation production released during the company's existence, although Crime and Punishment was belatedly released in 2002 by another entity.

== Plot ==
The film starts with footage of a group of terrorists modifying toy guns to a real gun which can easily pass through a metal detector at Athens Airport. When a kid named Paul Cartowski discovers that the terrorist bring plastic guns, he soon wonders and tells his father who is also a former CIA and Navy SEAL, Brad Cartowski. Then a gunfight begins and Cartowski is injured during a pursuit when the terrorists take the airport bus. The terrorists kidnaps his wife and fly her on a hijacked plane to North Africa. Cartowski goes in pursuit, aided by another ex-SEAL, Cody Grant.

Cartowski soon finds the terrorists' hide-out but is captured. They strip him almost naked, tie him up, beat him brutally, humiliate him, and subject him to long electro-torture sessions before he manages to escape. He soon returns with reinforcements of a group of Navy SEAL team to rescue his wife. The group of Navy SEALs sneak in the house with their stealth abilities. Alya, the female terrorist is the first who gets killed. Then Patrick, one of the terrorist manage to shoot one of the SEAL in the leg but the SEAL survives and able to playing dead on Patrick then kills him via neck-breaking, the SEAL then continue his mission with his partner.

As Cartowski is able to kill another terrorist, he and Cody then ambushes Carlos, the leader of the terrorist group. As Cody shoots Carlos in the head, Cartowki rescues his wife. The mission was a success without a SEAL dies.

After receiving permission from The Pentagon, Cartowski manages to blow the terrorists' house with explosions the SEALs planted in the house shortly before the mission starts. The rest of the SEALs doing a small celebration of their success to bring the terrorist down and rescue Cartowski's wife. The film ends with a footage of Cartowski and his wife meets his mother and his son, then they starts to huge each other with happiness of the success of bringing Cartowski's wife back with small injury. The rest of the SEALs especially Cody watch happily when the Cartowki's family reunited successfully.

== Cast ==
- Michael Paré as Brad Cartowski
- Claudette Mink as Marcy Cartowski
- Jan-Michael Vincent as Cody Grant
- Billy Drago as Jose Maria Carlos
- Juliano Mer-Khamis as Antonio Valdez (credited as Juliano Mer)
- Alon Abutbul as Patrick
- Galit Giat as Alya
- John Phillips as Vice Admiral Steve Burns
- Gabi Amrani as Gabi Barudi
- Dean Bloch as Paul Cartowski
- Hilde Levin as Mrs. Katherine Cartowski
- Jack Whitaker as Ambassador Bill Fielding
- Jack Adalist as Steve Jones
- Uri Gavriel as Captain Abou
- Yehuda Efroni as Dr. Mendopfist
- Isa Alkalai as Pablo

== Production ==
Filming was initially announced for May 1995, and principal photography eventually took place between June 6 and July 9, 1993. The film was primarily shot in the Tel Aviv region, with Ben Gurion Airport representing Athens Airport. Due to the site's sensitive nature, the shotlist had to be modified to omit certain background locations, which could have revealed the position of military forces protecting it. Production also rented United Studios in Herzliya. To save on expenses, stock footage was used, most prominently during the car chase, which is in large part recycled from Killing Streets, an earlier Golan production where Paré and Israeli actor Gabi Amrani also appear.

Michael Paré enjoyed the shoot and the opportunity to work with Jan Michael Vincent, whom he had grown up watching, and who, despite his reputation for alcoholism, was on his best behavior on that occasion. Billy Drago admitted to finding his character virtually indistinguishable from the ones he had previously portrayed in Delta Force 2 and Death Ring, adding that he played them as one and the same in his mind.

== Release ==
=== Pre-release ===
The film was screened for industry professionals during the MIFED (Mercato internazionale del film e del documentario) held in Milan, Italy, between October 24 and October 29, 1993.

=== Theatrical ===
Deadly Heroes was released in Canadian theaters via a touring release, starting on July 8, 1994, in Toronto. In Toronto and Ottawa, it was released in a double feature with another Damian Lee production, the erotic thriller A Woman Scorned starring Shannon Tweed. Later in the year, it made its way to Metro Vancouver and Montreal. In the former, the film was briefly packaged with the newer Damian Lee-produced The Killing Machine, whereas in Montreal, that film followed it by one week.

=== Home media ===
The film arrived on Canadian VHS in the third week of January 1995 via C/FP Video. In the U.S., the film premiered directly on VHS on March 11, 1997, via Columbia TriStar Home Video, who also handled the film in other territories such as the U.K. The film was later featured in a season one episode of B-movie revival show Cinema Insomnia.

== Reception ==
Deadly Heroes has received primarily negative reviews. During the film's Canadian run, media watchdog Mediafilm—historically close to the Catholic church—excoriated its "bellicist spirit" and director Golan's "brand of demagogy rooted in crude pro-Americanism." Upon its arrival on U.S. home video, the Fort Worth Star-Telegram rated it one and a half star on a scale of one to five, commenting that "the leads are OK and the effects aren't bad, but the script is drivel." Ballantine Books' Video Movie Guide was scathing, rating the film a one on a scale of one to five, and labeling the film as "ludicrous", with the only enjoyable moments being "the occasional line of dialogue that's so bad it's good". Robert Pardi of TV Guide wrote that the filmmakers "deserve applause for the dynamic action scenes seen here", but found fault with the picture's "irritating gung-ho patriotism and its lip-smacking preoccupation with Marcy's abduction into white slavery". He concluded that "Deadly Heroes gets the job done, but the film deserves no distinguished service medal". VideoHound's Golden Movie Retriever, an annual film guide, rated the film a two on a scale of zero to four.

The film received a few mentions in academic works, which were equally unfavorable. Writing for the Israeli cinema compendium Casting a Giant Shadow, Zachary Ingle criticized Golan for, as he had already done with The Delta Force, once again rehashing his early hit Operation Thunderbolt, with all three films even using the same Athens setting. In his book Cinematic Terror: A Global History of Terrorism on Film, Tony Shaw also notes that "Deadly Heroes bore more than a passing resemblance to Operation Thunderbolt". Arabic social commentators have also named the film as part of a wave of Israeli-filmed 90s actioners that portrayed Arabs in a stereotypical light. When questioned about the film for a retrospective article on the subject by Israeli website Ynet, actress Galit Giat declined to talk about it.
