= Damian Lee =

Canadian film director, producer and screenwriter

- Born: 1950 (age 75–76)
- Education: University of Guelph
- Occupations: Film director and producer
- Years active: 1976–present
- Spouse: Lara Daans

Damian Lee (born 1950) is a Canadian film director and producer. A former competitive skier, he transitioned to televised sports events, and later to feature films. A fixture of low-budget genre movies during much of the 1980s and 1990s, Lee re-emerged as a director of more dramatic fare in the mid-2000s.

== Sports ==
=== Competitive ===
Lee was a competitive skier at the national and continental level. A product of the Don Valley Racers program in Toronto, he won the 1968 Southern Ontario Junior Championship in the giant slalom category. He later turned pro and spent the 1974–75 season on the World Pro Skiing tour, a primarily U.S.-based competition that was independent from the FIS Alpine Ski World Cup, as part of a team representing Blue Mountain. He appeared in the 1975 World Professional Skiing Championship, but did not advance past the qualifications.

Lee also discovered a love for boxing at a young age, and claims to have shared the ring with several talented fighters, most notably future world champion Trevor Berbick in his native Jamaica. He also tried his hand at bare knuckle combat. However, by his own admission, his prospects as a prize fighter were limited.

=== Sports promotion and television ===
Lee transitioned to event organizing with 1976's Great Canadian Race, a cross country challenge opened to everyone and every type of vehicles, with some of the proceeds given to charity. The format that was originally developed with a film adaptation in mind. Although that did not immediately happen, Lee's sports promotions continued and he created the company Rose & Ruby Productions in 1977, under the banner of which he would produce most of his work until 1993. In 1978, he was named Canadian scout the novelty "World Walk-On Heavyweight Boxing Championship", an everyman boxing tournament inspired by Rocky, although the event's U.S. promoter later failed to come up with the requisite financial guarantees. Also that year, Lee was named as a founding partner in the Toronto Grizzlies, a minor league gridiron football team that played in the Mid-Atlantic Football Conference.

With fellow producer/director David Mitchell, who would remain his partner for much of Rose & Ruby's history, Lee quickly managed to turn his small-time sports events into a television commodity. His programming proved financially attractive to commercial network CTV thanks to its anonymous participants and aggressive integration of corporate sponsors, whose product was sometimes the centerpoint of the competition. He also produced segments for Yesterday in the CFL, a half-time retrospective program hosted by Johnny Esaw that reconnected with the league's former stars. Lee claims credit for some 300 episodes of sports television programming over his career. He also dabbled in radio, producing the audio documentary Zen and the Art of Skiing. In 1981, Lee applied for a Canadian pay TV licence to launch a sports specialty channel under the auspices of CBR Sports Communications, a company backed by Comstock International's Charles Rathgeb. His name was touted for another bid two years later, but the project did not materialize.

== Feature films ==
In parallel with his early TV career, Lee briefly moonlighted in adult films. He moved into mainstream fiction in 1983 with the support of Citytv boss Moses Znaimer, who pitched in some money for his first television film, Copper Mountain, best known for boasting an early Jim Carrey leading role. This inconsequential effort paved the way for a career as one of Canada's main purveyors of low budget genre films. Perhaps the best regarded of these are a trilogy of underground boxing films, the second of which he directed, and which garnered a modicum of respect in some critical circles. Rose & Ruby also produced two horror features outsourced from the U.S. in collaboration with Roger Corman and Carolco. In the first half of the 1990s, Lee also entered a brief partnership with Menahem Golan's financially shaky 21st Century Film Corporation.

Around 1993, he abandoned the Rose & Ruby imprint to focus on a newer entity called Richmond House, aligning himself with U.S.-based Indian producer Ashok Amritraj's Amritraj Entertainment. Among Lee's productions with Amritraj was a series of vehicles for Canadian martial artist/actor Jeff Wincott which, while severely criticized for their lack of polish, earned some notice for tackling real world issues that foreshadowed the director's more recent efforts. In 1996, Lee merged Richmond House with Canadian distributor United Multimedia to form the publicly traded Noble House Communications. He made just one film and in 1997 left the company, which proved underfunded and soon fell into limbo.

In 1997, Lee founded another company called Stone Canyon to promote a batch of higher budgeted films for such stars as Dolph Lundgren and Steven Seagal. In 1998, he also joined the short-lived Annex Entertainment, a new Toronto company started by former Paragon Entertainment boss Richard Borchiver and real estate mogul Paul Wynn. At Annex, Lee maintained his association with Amritraj and his partner Andrew Stevens, providing production services for the pair's Phoenician Entertainment label. However, that relationship was damaged when Lee lobbied to direct 2000's Agent Red, and delivered a cut that was deemed unreleasable, requiring substantial reshoots. Lee seemingly rebounded when New Cinema Partners, a Nevada-based corporation with Canadian ties, announced its acquisition of Stone Canyon in 2000. He was named president of NCP but was unsuccessful in raising funding for the embattled company, and departed within the next year. Further attempts to align with Ami Artzi's Milestone Media Group did not pan out either.

Following a multiyear release hiatus, Lee resurfaced for good around 2005 with a new version of his old company Noble House, now called Noble House Entertainment, operated with Lowell Conn and Canadian industry veteran Julian Grant. Lee professed his willingness to stick to more prestigious and artistically oriented projects from then on. He also formed a partnership with Paul Wynn, his former backer at Annex, and controversial American producer Julius Nasso, overseeing the construction of Nasso's Staten Island film studio while the latter was serving time for his extortion attempt on Steven Seagal. A trio of early 2010s pictures were produced by longtime Canadian acquaintances Gary Howsam and Bill Marks, the latter of which had worked for him in the 1990s.

== Personal life ==
Lee attended the University of Guelph in Ontario, and graduated with a Bachelor of Arts degree in political science in 1970.

The director met Canadian actress Lara Daans during the 1997 American Film Market, and the two were married later in the same year. He had a daughter with Daans in 2002. Zion Forrest Lee, a son from a previous relationship, has been active in experimental music and film, sometimes teaming up with his father.

During his competitive skiing years, Lee was director of the Inner City Adventures program, which offered mountain sports trips for underprivileged inner city youths. Lee has supported some philanthropic causes, including Kids, Cops and Computers, a computer literacy program started by the Merry Go Round Police Foundation and directed at underprivileged children of the Toronto area. As of 2025, he sat on the foundation's board of directors.

== Filmography ==
=== Film ===
| Year | Title | Credited as | | | Notes |
| Year | Title | Director | Writer | Producer | Notes |
|---|---|---|---|---|---|
| 1978 | Hot Assets | Yes | Yes | Yes | |
| 1979 | Baby Love and Beau | Yes | Yes | Yes | |
| 1984 | Reno and the Doc | No | Yes | No | |
| 1985 | Space Rage | No | No | Yes | Associate producer |
| 1986 | Loose Ends | No | No | Yes | Also known as Screwball Academy |
| 1986 | Busted Up | No | Yes | Yes | |
| 1987 | Circle Man | Yes | Yes | Yes | Also known as Last Man Standing |
| 1987 | City of Shadows | No | Yes | Yes | |
| 1988 | Watchers | No | Yes | Yes | |
| 1989 | Food of the Gods II | Yes | No | Yes | Also known as Gnaw: Food of the Gods II |
| 1989 | Thunderground | No | Yes | Yes | |
| 1990 | The Miles Ahead | No | Yes | Yes | Also known as Hot Sneakers |
| 1990 | Abraxas, Guardian of the Universe | Yes | Yes | Yes | |
| 1990 | Ski School | Yes | No | Yes | |
| 1991 | Deadly Descent | Yes | Yes | Yes | |
| 1992 | Baby on Board | No | Yes | Yes | |
| 1993 | Deadly Heroes | No | Yes | Yes | |
| 1993 | Scorned | No | No | Yes | Also known as A Woman Scorned |
| 1994 | Death Wish V | No | No | Yes | |
| 1994 | Fun | No | No | Yes | Co-producer |
| 1994 | National Lampoon's Last Resort | No | Yes | Yes | |
| 1994 | The Killing Machine | No | Yes | Yes | Also known as The Killing Man; Took possessory credit "a Damian Lee picture" |
| 1995 | The Donor | Yes | No | Yes | |
| 1995 | Law of the Jungle | Yes | Yes | Yes | |
| 1995 | No Exit | Yes | Yes | Yes | |
| 1996 | Electra | No | Yes | Yes | Executive producer |
| 1996 | When the Bullet Hits the Bone | Yes | Yes | Yes | |
| 1996 | Specimen | No | No | Yes | |
| 1996 | Terminal Rush | Yes | No | Yes | |
| 1996 | Moving Target | Yes | No | Yes | |
| 1997 | Virus | No | No | Yes | |
| 1997 | Inner Action | Yes | Yes | Yes | |
| 1998 | Papertrail | Yes | Yes | Yes | |
| 1998 | Jungle Boy | No | Yes | Yes | |
| 1999 | Woman Wanted | No | No | Yes | |
| 1999 | Meet Prince Charming | No | No | Yes | |
| 2000 | Jill Rips | No | No | Yes | |
| 2000 | Mercy | No | No | Yes | |
| 2000 | Agent Red | Yes | Yes | Yes | |
| 2001 | One Eyed King | No | No | Yes | |
| 2007 | The Poet | Yes | No | Yes | Also known as Hearts of War |
| 2008 | Never Cry Werewolf | No | Script consultant | No | |
| 2011 | Sacrifice | Yes | Yes | No | |
| 2012 | A Dark Truth | Yes | Yes | No | |
| 2013 | Hit It | Yes | Yes | No | |
| 2013 | Breakout | Yes | Yes | No | |
| 2014 | A Fighting Man | Yes | Yes | No | |
| 2016 | Home Invasion | No | No | Yes | |

=== Television ===
| Year | Title | Credited as | | | Notes |
| Year | Title | Director | Writer | Producer | Notes |
|---|---|---|---|---|---|
| 1983 | Copper Mountain | No | Yes | Yes | Also known as Copper Mountain: A Club Med Experience |
| 1998 | Merlin: The Quest Begins | No | No | Yes | |
| 2007 | King of Sorrow | Yes | Yes | Yes | |
| 2014–15 | When Calls the Heart | No | No | Yes | Supervising producer 14 episodes |
| 2016 | Flower Shop Mysteries: Mum's The Word | No | No | Yes | Executive producer Also known as Killer Arrangement |
| 2016 | Ice Girls | Yes | Yes | No | |
