= Mission of Justice =

1992 film by Steve Barnett

- Directed by: Steve Barnett
- Written by: George Saunders; John Bryant; Pierre David
- Starring: Brigitte Nielsen; Jeff Wincott; Luca Bercovici
- Cinematography: Peter Fernberger
- Edited by: Brent A. Schoenfeld
- Music by: Richard Bowers
- Distributed by: Image Organization; Westwind Productions Inc.
- Release date: December 2, 1992
- Running time: 95 minutes
- Country: United States
- Language: English

Mission of Justice is a 1992 action/martial arts film starring Brigitte Nielsen and directed by Steve Barnett. A standalone sequel to Martial Law 2: Undercover (1991) and it is the third installment in the Martial Law film series.

== Plot ==
After his friend is killed, former cop Kurt Harris (Jeff Wincott) goes undercover and infiltrates the "Peacemakers", a vigilante street gang led by corrupt mayoral candidate Rachel Larkin (Brigitte Nielsen). While there, Harris discovers that the group is involved in illegal schemes to achieve power over the city.

== Cast ==
- Brigitte Nielsen as Dr. Rachel K. Larkin
- Jeff Wincott as Kurt Harris
- Luca Bercovici as Roger Stockwell
- Mathias Hues as Titus Larkin
- Karen Sheperd as Lynn Steele
- Billy Sly Williams as Jimmy Parker
- Christopher Kriesa as Sergeant Duncan
- Cyndi Pass as Erin Miller
- Tom Wood as Samuel
- James Lew as Akiro
- Adrian Ricard as Flora Parker
- Tony Burton as Cedric Williams
