= Papertrail =

1998 film by Damian Lee

- Original poster art
- Directed by: Damian Lee
- Written by: Damian Lee; Joseph O'Brien
- Produced by: Damian Lee
- Starring: Chris Penn; Michael Madsen; Chad McQueen; Jennifer Dale; Terri Hawkes
- Cinematography: Nicholas Josef von Sternberg
- Edited by: Paul G. Day
- Music by: Electronic Dream Factory
- Production company: Noble House Entertainment
- Distributed by: Avalanche Home Entertainment (Canada, U.S.)
- Release date: September 11, 1998 (Canada)
- Running time: 89 minutes
- Country: Canada
- Language: English

Papertrail is a 1998 Canadian thriller film produced, co-written and directed by Damian Lee, starring Chris Penn, Michael Madsen and Chad McQueen (who is also credited as executive producer). In it, a loner detective is brought back to the unsolved serial killer case that once destroyed his social life, when he is asked to attend a therapy group whose psychiatrist has been receiving phone calls from the perpetrator. On North American home video, the film was renamed Trail of a Serial Killer, while it is known as Serial Cops in the U.K.

== Plot ==
Jason Enola is an obsessive FBI agent who is almost losing his mind after ten years on the tail of an elusive serial killer whose hallmark is the "paper trail" of notes left along with the victims. Brad Abraham is the agent buddy who is watching Enola's back. As the film begins, a new wave of killings start after four years of silence, and the psychiatrist Dr. Alyce Robertson becomes involved when she starts receiving telephone calls from the killer.

== Cast ==
- Chris Penn as Det. Jason Enola
- Michael Madsen as Brad Abraham
- Chad McQueen as William Frost
- Jennifer Dale as Dr. Alyce Robertson
- Terri Hawkes as Rachel Quinn
- Catherine Blythe as Gail Morgan
- Kenneth McGregor as Jerry Saracen
- Thea Gill as Eileen Gibbs
- Shawn Doyle as Chuck Switzer
- Kari Matchett as Alison Enola
- Andrea McCabe as Cynthia Scott
- C.J. Lusby as Rialla Frost (as C.J. Fidler)
- Don "The Dragon" Wilson as FBI Agent Ryu
- Randy O'Connell as FBI Agent Nicky

== Production ==
The film was originally known under the working title of Fear. It was co-written by Joseph O'Brien, a future writer for the Canadian horror film magazine Rue Morgue. O'Brien was displeased with the finished product, calling it "atrocious" and humorously noting that he tried to avoid conversations about it. It was the first and only film directed by Damian Lee for the original incarnation of Noble House Entertainment, a short-lived company born of the merger of his existing production outfit, Richmond House, with Canadian distributor United Media (although Lee would later revive the Noble House brand with different investors). Michelle Johnson, who starred in several of Lee's works around that time, was attached to the project late into pre-production, but does not appear.

Photography took place in the Toronto metropolitan area during parts of November and December 1996, under the title of Papertrail. Scenes from the final set piece involving a wounded Chris Penn were filmed on the city's major artery of Yonge Street. In a Toronto Star article published ahead of release, the actor playing the serial killer mentioned feeling uncomfortable during the shoot due to the nature of the role, revealing part of the ending.

== Release ==
=== Pre-release ===
The film was promoted to industry professionals at the 1997 Cannes Film Market by Noble House, and at the 1997 MIFED (Mercato internazionale del film e del documentario) in Milan, Italy, where its sales representative was the fledgling Shoreline Entertainment.

=== Theatrical ===
Papertrail opened in limited release in Toronto on September 11, 1998, through Cineplex Odeon.

=== Home media ===
In the U.S., the film premiered on VHS and DVD on 29 September 1998. On Canadian and U.S. home video, the film was published by Lions Gate Entertainment via their Avalanche Home Entertainment label, and the title was changed to Trail of a Serial Killer.

== Reception ==
Papertrail has received mixed reviews. Robert Cettl, author of the book Serial Killer Cinema: An Analytical Filmography, described the film as a marriage of the group therapy setting seen in Color of Night, Schizoid and Canada's Phobia, with aesthetics drawn from Seven. He granted that, while not up to the genre's best, it was "stylish in the expected brooding manner of such derivative works as Bone Daddy [in which Hawkes has a minor role] and Resurrection." Canadian media watchdog Mediafilm was along the same lines. It deemed that the film boasted "average performances and direction", while offering "a well-maintained suspense, but a botched finale" and "the usual cliches".

== Soundtrack ==
The film's score was composed by Toronto-based industrial rock band Electronic Dream Factory, who had already contributed the score to the Lee production Specimen.

== Sequel ==
Lee's 2007 film King of Sorrow takes place in the same narrative universe, and Chris Penn makes a supporting appearance, returning as his character Jason Enola. On Canadian home video, the film was released as Trail of a Serial Killer II: King of Sorrow.
