= Christina Cox =

Canadian actress

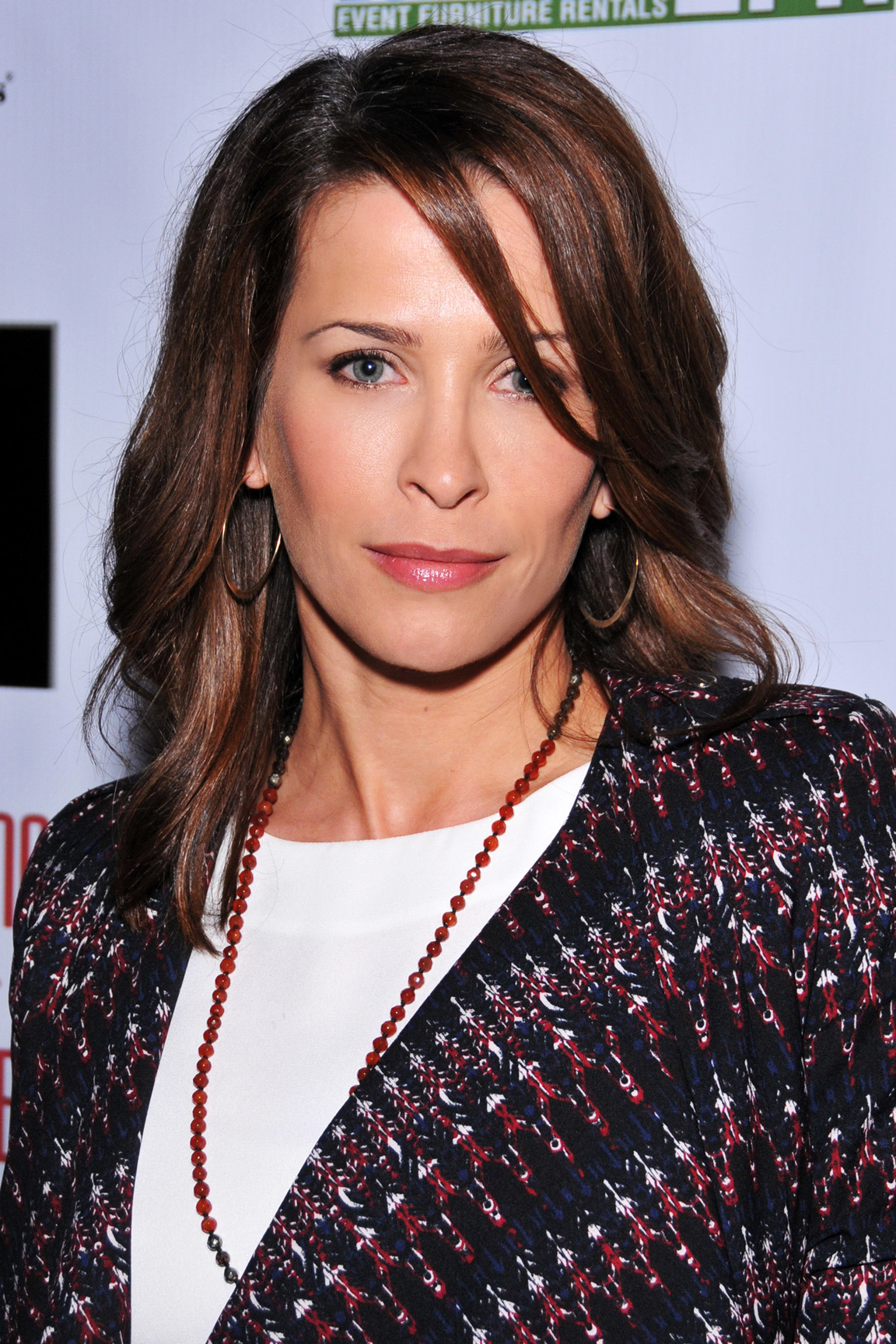
- Christina Cox in West Hollywood, 2013
- Occupations: Actress, stuntwoman
- Years active: 1990–present
- Spouse: Grant Mattos (m. 2011)
- Children: 1

Christina Cox is a Canadian film and television actress and stuntwoman.

== Early life ==
Born in a town on the outskirts of Ontario, Cox is a mixed-race Canadian of Irish, English, Scottish, German, Dutch, and African-Jamaican descent. She has two older sisters. Her father is an automotive executive.

Cox studied theatre and dance at the Arts York program at Unionville High School. She competed in gymnastics, track and field, and taekwondo. She had aspirations of becoming an Olympic gymnast, but instead chose to focus on drama and theater.

After high school, she studied for two years at the Ryerson Theatre School of Toronto.

She is also proficient in boxing, muay Thai kickboxing, and fencing, and has had training in stage combat, period weaponry, and firearms.

== Career ==
Cox has more than 38 movie and television appearances. Her best-known movie credits include the 1999 Canadian movie Better Than Chocolate, and the movie The Chronicles of Riddick. She received a Gemini Award nomination for her performance as Angela Ramírez in F/X: The Series. Initially, Cox was a cast member of the UPN sitcom Girlfriends, played as Lynn, for the pilot episode, but replaced by another mixed-race actress Persia White in the final-cut series.

Cox has appeared in numerous national theater productions, including Shakespeare's Twelfth Night, and Jim Cartwright's Road.

She is a trained stuntwoman who performed boxing stunt work for Hilary Swank in Million Dollar Baby.

Cox's first role as a main character in a television series was that of Vicki Nelson in Blood Ties, a supernatural detective series based on the novels by Tanya Huff. Huff later said, "Back when Christina Cox was doing F/X: The Series, I used to point at the screen and announce, 'When she's a little older, she'd be brilliant as Vicki!"

She starred as astronaut-biologist Jen Crane in ABC's 2009 summer show Defying Gravity. Cox also appeared in a Season Four episode of Showtime's series Dexter, playing villainous police officer Zoey Kruger. She was in the cast of the 2011 ABC summer drama Combat Hospital (a.k.a. The Hot Zone), alongside Elias Koteas and Deborah Kara Unger. She has appeared in the NCIS episode Freedom.

== Personal life ==
Cox is married to Grant Mattos, a former NFL wide receiver for the San Diego Chargers. They eloped and married on October 1, 2010, soon after he returned from competing on Survivor: Redemption Island. Their daughter was born in December 2013.

== Filmography ==
=== Film ===
| Year | Title | Role | Notes |
|---|---|---|---|
| 1994 | Spike of Love | Deb | |
| 1995 | Street Law | Kelly | |
| 1995 | The Donor | Angel | |
| 1996 | No One Could Protect Her | Det. Elizabeth 'Beth' Jordan | |
| 1999 | Better Than Chocolate | Kim | |
| 2000 | Code Name Phoenix | Aurora | |
| 2001 | Jane Doe | Peter | |
| 2003 | Sometimes a Hero | Cassandra Diaz | |
| 2004 | The Chronicles of Riddick | Eve Logan | |
| 2006 | Max Havoc: Ring of Fire | Suzy Blaine | |
| 2007 | Ascension Day | Margaret Whitehead | |
| 2013 | Beauty Mark | Dianne | Short film |
| 2013 | Elysium | CCB Agent | |
| 2013 | The Contractor | Elizabeth Chase | |
| 2018 | F.R.E.D.I. | Williams | |

=== Television ===
| Year | Title | Role | Notes |
|---|---|---|---|
| 1992 | Catwalk | Suzie | Episode: "Six Hip Hoppers & Yo Babe" |
| 1992, 1994 | Forever Knight | Jeanne d'Arc | 2 episodes |
| 1994–1995 | Due South | Caroline Morgan | Episodes: "Free Willie","Vault" |
| 1995 | Kung Fu: The Legend Continues | Kyra | Episode: "Quake!" |
| 1995 | Forever Knight | Motorcycle Cop | Episode: "Close Call" |
| 1995 | The Hardy Boys | Tessa Jones | Episode: "The Debt Collectors" |
| 1996 | A Brother's Promise: The Dan Jansen Story | Natalie Grenier | Television movie |
| 1996 | Sins of Silence | Volunteer | Television movie |
| 1996 | Lonesome Dove: The Outlaw Years | Lucy | Episode: "When She Was Good" |
| 1996 | Mistrial | Officer Ida Cruz | Television movie |
| 1996 | The Newsroom | Prostitute in Limo | Episode: "Petty Tyranny" |
| 1996–1998 | F/X: The Series | Angela 'Angie' Ramirez | Main role, 38 episodes |
| 1998 | First Wave | Jody Nolan | Episode: "Joshua" |
| 1998 | Stargate SG-1 | T'akaya | Episode: "Spirits" |
| 1998–1999 | The Crow: Stairway to Heaven | Jessica Capshaw | Recurring role, 10 episodes |
| 1999–2000 | Earth: Final Conflict | Haley Simmons | Episodes: "Second Chances", "Thicker Than Blood", "Take No Prisoners" |
| 2000 | The Outer Limits | Deb Clement | Episode: "Skin Deep" |
| 2000 | Psi Factor: Chronicles of the Paranormal | Jessica 'Jessie' Wilson | Episode: "GeoCore" |
| 2000 | Code Name Phoenix | Aurora | Television movie |
| 2000 | Girlfriends | Lynn Searcy | Episode: Pilot (unaired) |
| 2000 | Code Name: Eternity | Sasha | Episode: "The Shift" |
| 2001 | Dark Realm | Kate | Episode: "The House Sitter" |
| 2001 | Jane Doe | Peter | Television movie |
| 2002 | Stargate SG-1 | Lt. Kershaw | Episode: "The Sentinel" |
| 2003 | Mutant X | Becky Dolan | Episode: "The Grift" |
| 2003 | She Spies | Margo | Episode: "Damsels in De-Stress" |
| 2003 | Cold Case | Sherry Stephens (2003) | Episode: "Sherry Darlin'" |
| 2004 | Andromeda | Aleiss | Episode: "Exalted Reason, Resplendent Daughter" |
| 2004 | Nikki & Nora | Nora Delaney | Unsold television pilot |
| 2004 | CSI: Miami | Jenny Moylan | Episode: "Stalkerazzi" |
| 2004 | The Chris Isaak Show | Pamela | Episode: "Braveheart" |
| 2005 | This Is Wonderland | Wendy | Episode: 2.11 |
| 2005 | Eyes | Linda Barstow | Episode: "Wings" |
| 2005 | House | Annette Raines | Episode: "Love Hurts" |
| 2005 | NUMB3RS | CHP Officer Morris | Episode: "Man Hunt" |
| 2007 | Bones | Anne Marie Ostenbach | Episode: "Death in the Saddle" |
| 2007–2008 | Blood Ties | Vicki Nelson | Main role, 22 episodes |
| 2008 | Making Mr. Right | Hallie Galloway | Television movie |
| 2008 | S.I.S. | Roz | Television movie |
| 2008 | Stargate Atlantis | Major Anne Teldy | Episode: "Whispers" |
| 2009 | Dexter | Officer Zoey Kruger | Episode: "Dex Takes a Holiday" |
| 2009 | Defying Gravity | Jen Crane | Main role, 13 episodes |
| 2010 | 24 | Molly O'Connor | Episode: "Day 8: 5:00 a.m.-6:00 a.m." |
| 2010 | The Stepson | Donna May | Television movie |
| 2010 | The Mentalist | Delinda LeCure | Episode: "The Red Ponies" |
| 2011 | Survivor: Redemption Island | Herself | Episode: "Reunion" |
| 2011 | NCIS | Marine Gunnery Sgt. Georgia Wooten | Episode: "Freedom" |
| 2011 | Combat Hospital | Cmt. Ariel Garamond | Episode: "Inner Truth", "Reckless" |
| 2012 | Fugitive at 17 | Det. Cameron Langford | Television movie |
| 2012 | Virtual Lies | Jamie Chapman | Television movie |
| 2013 | Castle | Maggie Finch | Episode: "The Wild Rover" |
| 2013 | Eve of Destruction | Rachel Reed | Television miniseries |
| 2014 | Crimes of the Mind | Carolyn Raeburn | Television movie |
| 2014–2015 | Arrow | Mayor Celia Castle | 3 episodes |
| 2015 | NCIS: Los Angeles | FBI Agent Allison Conway | Episode: "Fighting Shadows" |
| 2015 | NCIS: New Orleans | NOPD Detective Dinah Clark | Episode: "Blue Christmas" |
| 2016–2018 | Shadowhunters | Elaine Lewis | Recurring role, 11 episodes |
| 2016 | Elementary | Christa Pullman | Episode: "Art Imitates Art" |
| 2016 | Deadly Dance Mom | Jeanette Grayson | Television movie |
| 2017 | iZombie | Katty Kupps | 4 episodes |
| 2017 | Deadly Lessons | Detective James | Television movie |
| 2018 | Lethal Soccer Mom | Rhonda | Television movie |
| 2018 | Life Sentence | Judge Sandra Cramer | Episode: "Our Father the Hero" |
| 2019 | Criminal Minds | Agent Brenda Channing | Episode: "Hamelin" |
| 2019 | Ruby Herring Mysteries: Her Last Breath | Amanda Kelly | Television movie |
| 2023–2024 | Reacher | Marlo Burns | 3 episodes |
| 2024 | The Boarding School Murders | Jane Ainsworth | Television movie |

=== Web ===
| Year | Title | Role | Notes |
|---|---|---|---|
| 2008–2009 | 3 Way | Jo / Lara Lancaster | 4 episodes |
| 2014 | Nikki & Nora | Nora Delaney | 7 episodes, also executive producer |

== Awards ==
| Year | Award | Category | Work nominated | Result |
|---|---|---|---|---|
| 1998 | Gemini Award | Best Performance by an Actress in a Continuing Leading Dramatic Role | F/X: The Series | Nominated |
