= The Killing Machine (1994 film) =

- Original poster art
- Directed by: David Mitchell
- Written by: David Mitchell; Damian Lee
- Produced by: Damian Lee; Ashok Amritraj (Executive)
- Starring: Jeff Wincott; Michael Ironside; Terri Hawkes; David Campbell; Calista Carradine
- Cinematography: David Pelletier
- Edited by: David Buder
- Music by: Ronald J. Weiss
- Production companies: Amritraj Entertainment; Richmond House
- Distributed by: Vantage Media
- Release dates: September 1994 (Canada); January 1995 (U.S.)
- Running time: 100 minutes
- Country: Canada
- Language: English
- Budget: CAD$750,000

The Killing Machine, also known as The Killing Man, is a 1994 Canadian-American action-thriller film written and directed by David Mitchell, starring Jeff Wincott and Michael Ironside. In it, an amnesiac contract killer seeking to escape the clutches of a shadowy government agency allies with a whistleblower, who may have uncovered a conspiracy regarding the human engineering of the AIDS epidemic.

== Plot ==
Professional hitman Harlin Garrett is left for dead, the victim of a hit orchestrated by his mafia employers after they decide he has outlived his usefulness to them. He wakes up in a secluded facility under the watch of a covert government agency led by a menacing man only known as Mr. Green. Garrett, who is amnesiac and initially has no recollection of his violent proclivities, is coaxed and trained into killing again on the agency's behalf.

This time, his mission is to wipe out various activists who have ties to HIV research or the gay community. Garrett's key target is scientist Ann Kendall, who seems to have proof that the spread of the virus has been enabled by the government. But Garrett, who has been tasked with seducing Kendall before killing her to find out how much she knows, ends up falling for her and turns against his new employers.

== Cast ==
- Jeff Wincott as Harlin Garrett
- Michael Ironside as Mr. Green
- Terri Hawkes as Dr. Ann Kendall
- David Campbell as Turner
- Calista Carradine as Jane
- Richard Fitzpatrick as Baker
- Jeff Pustil as Conners
- Michael Copeman as Steve Rogers
- David Bolt as Tom Hansen
- Doug O'Keeffe as Sgt. Terry

== Production ==
The Killing Machine was the first of several films starring Jeff Wincott from Canadian producer Damian Lee, following a string of vehicles with fellow Canadian producer Pierre David. Unlike David's films, which were made in the U.S., those were shot in Canada. The Killing Machine was filmed in the Toronto area between December 4 and December 23, 1993. The picture had a modest budget of CAD$750,000. The actor reported being ill-at-ease with some of the film's nudity, which caused him to botch a few takes due to his nervousness. Although he did not technically direct the film, Lee still took the possessory credit "a Damian Lee picture". As with other films in this informal series, Lee also provided production services through his company Richmond House. The film is dedicated to the memory of popular Toronto film figure Janet Good, longtime owner of Canadian Motion Picture Equipment Rentals, who had a few cameos in earlier Lee productions.

== Release ==
The film received theatrical distribution in its native Canada in the form of a touring regional release from Cinépix/Famous Players Distribution. It was shown in the Toronto area in late September 1994 and the Vancouver area in early November, before a slightly longer run in Montreal in the second half of December, which benefited from some adverts in the press. The home video release, which was promoted by some local media appearances from Wincott, followed on January 4, 1995, from sister company C/FP Video.

In the U.S., the film premiered on home video in the third week of January 1995 under the alternate title The Killing Man, via A-Pix Entertainment.

== Reception ==
In his column for the New York Daily News, genre critic Joe Kane praised the film as a "reel surprise" and "a lean, mean existentialist thriller", praising Ironside's performance and Mitchell's dark script. TV Guide found particular fault with the film's use of homosexuality and HIV as plot devices, and assessing: "Although the villain of this muddled piece is a reactionary, [...] what's truly unsettling is how callously this numbskull action pic uses the plague of contemporary times as a plot-prop for human carnage and macho flag-waving." The British Film Institute's magazine Sight and Sound took the opposite stance and argued that "this low-key release confounds the view that martial arts/action genre is the last bastion of male prejudice". It called the screenplay "part sci-fi fantasy, part radical political rant" and the picture "an unexpected, enjoyable treat".

== Soundtrack ==
The soundtrack features the songs "Adura" by Hunter/Greer and "Merry-Go-Round" by Big Faith, two projects from former Red Rider guitarist Ken Greer, who went on to score a pair of later Lee/Wincott efforts, No Exit and When the Bullet Hits the Bone. Actress Callista Carradine also contributes a song entitled "Walk Through Fire".

== Later films ==
Wincott appeared in a series of four more vehicles for Lee and Amritraj: The Donor, Law of the Jungle, No Exit and When the Bullet Hits the Bone. Those were directed by Lee himself. In 2006, Mitchell produced and directed The Ultimate Killing Machine, a film that explores broadly similar themes of government-engineered human weapons in a more horrific tone, although there is no direct narrative continuity between the two.
