= Agent Red =

- Official DVD cover
- Directed by: Damian Lee; Jim Wynorski
- Written by: Damian Lee; Steve Latshaw
- Produced by: Jim Wynorski; Alison Semenza
- Starring: Dolph Lundgren
- Cinematography: Ken Blakey
- Edited by: Joel T. Pashby
- Music by: Eric Wurst; David Wurst
- Distributed by: Phoenician Entertainment; Franchise Pictures
- Release date: December 27, 2000
- Running time: 95 minutes
- Country: United States
- Language: English
- Budget: $2,000,000

Agent Red is a 2000 American action film directed by Damian Lee and Jim Wynorski and starring Dolph Lundgren. Its plot concerns two soldiers stuck on a submarine with a group of terrorists who plan to use a chemical weapon on America.

== Plot ==
Captain Matt Hendricks and Dr. Linda Christian are locked in a submarine with Russian terrorists that threaten to launch a chemical virus on US territory.

== Cast ==
- Dolph Lundgren as Captain Matt Hendricks
- Meilani Paul as Dr. Linda Christian
- Alexander Kuznetsov as Dr. Nikolai Kretz
- Natalie Radford as Nadia
- Randolph Mantooth as Admiral Edwards
- Neal Matarazzo as Lieutenant Matarazzo
- Tony Becker as Lieutenant Jack Colson
- Steve Eastin as Commander Russert
- Allan Kolman as Ziggy
- Larry Carroll as Newscaster
- Robert Donavan as General Minowski
- Pat Skelton as Borenz
- Stephen Macht as General Stillwell
- William Langlois as The President
- Melissa Brasselle as Dr. Baker
- Steve Franken as General Socka
- Lenny Juliano as Captain
- Peter Spellos as Colonel Korsky
- Sonny King as Lieutenant Commander Rogers

== Production ==
The project originated as a pitch written by Kevin Bernhardt and was pre-sold under the title "Captured".

Steve Latshaw was approached by producer Andrew Stevens to rewrite his script "Counter Measures" for a Dolph Lundgren film, Latsaw later discovered that Damian Lee was hired to write the script, and also be the film's director.

After filming was completed, Stevens deemed the film too inept to be released, and brought Latshaw in to make the film at least half-competent, while Jim Wynorski was hired to direct some new scenes (about 40 minutes of footage in three days) and insert stock footage (mostly from Fred Olen Ray's Counter Measures with Michael Dudikoff of which it became a remake) where appropriate.
