= A Fighting Man =

- Film poster
- Directed by: Damian Lee
- Written by: Damian Lee
- Produced by: Gary Howsam; Bill Marks
- Starring: Dominic Purcell; James Caan; Louis Gossett Jr.; Famke Janssen
- Cinematography: Bobby Shore
- Edited by: William Steinkamp
- Music by: Jonathan Goldsmith
- Production companies: Rollercoaster Entertainment; Vortex Words Pictures
- Distributed by: Bandwidth Digital Releasing; Sony Pictures Home Entertainment
- Release date: April 25, 2014 (Canada)
- Running time: 88 minutes
- Country: Canada
- Language: English

A Fighting Man is a 2014 drama sports film written and directed by Damian Lee. It stars Dominic Purcell, James Caan, Louis Gossett Jr., and Famke Janssen. It was released in Canada on 25 April 2014.

== Summary ==
Sailor O'Connor is a retired Irish boxer, who has not once been knocked down in the 63 matches he has fought. Sailor's mother Rose is dying of cancer and Sailor wants to take her to Ireland one last time before she passes. After negotiating with Fast Eddie, a local promoter, Sailor secures enough money whether or not he wins. Though a long way from his prime, Sailor convinces his old training team Brother Albright and Max to get into shape for the bout against a younger opponent. A local priest, Father Brennan, tries to convince Rose to have Sailor back out of the fight, to which she says it's up to Sailor.

King Solomon is an adult film actor seeking a way out of his current situation. His girlfriend Peg tells him she's pregnant and Solomon wants to live a proper life with her. Formerly an up-and-coming boxer, and still in his prime, Solomon quits his career in pornography and goes to Cubby, his former boxing coach, promising to stay dedicated to his boxing career. He begins his training for the fight against Sailor. Solomon's mother, a drug user and alcoholic, cannot cope with her son's wanting to leave, and like his father, believes he will be back.

Leading up to the fight, Sailor, Rose, Solomon, Father Brennan, and Diane Scheuler, a recovering alcoholic, all attempt to overcome their demons. Diane attempts to ask Sailor several times for forgiveness for some unspoken thing she did to Sailor, and each time he rebuffs her.

The fight arrives, and it proves to be a brutal event, with neither fighter showing signs of giving up out of either stubbornness or motivation. Diane and Peg sit together at ringside. As the final round is about to start, Fast Eddie announces a large bonus to either man to call it quits right then and there. Neither take up the offer, so the final round begins. When the final seconds and punches hit, Sailor flashes back to the tragedy in which Diane killed Sailor's wife and two children (and possibly her own children, shown riding with her) in a drunk driving incident. Never knocked down and refusing to give up, a clearly defeated Sailor is shown respect by Solomon, who holds Sailor upright for the dying seconds of the fight. When the final bell rings, the two boxers congratulate each other. King Solomon is declared the unanimous winner of the bout and each man heads to the locker room. As Diane passes by Sailor, he tells her that there may be a way that he may forgive her some time in the future.

== Cast ==
(in closing credits order)

- Dominic Purcell as "Sailor" O'Connor
- Kim Coates as Father Brennan
- Michael Ironside as Max Wynn
- Louis Gossett Jr. as "Cubby"
- Adam Beach as Fast Eddie
- Sheila McCarthy as Rose, Sailor's Dying Mother
- Izaak Smith as "King" Solomon
- Jenessa Grant as Peg, King's Pregnant Wife
- Famke Janssen as Diane Schuler
- James Caan as Brother Albright

Actual trainer and former boxer Freddie Roach has a cameo as the fight doctor determining Sailor's fitness to continue the final round.

== Production ==
A list of the main actors was confirmed in April 2013, the week before filming started in Sudbury, and Toronto, Ontario, Canada, North Carolina and South Carolina.
