= The Poet (2007 film) =

- Directed by: Damian Lee
- Written by: Jack Crystal
- Produced by: Lowell Conn; Damian Lee
- Starring: Nina Dobrev; Colm Feore; Roy Scheider; Kim Coates; Daryl Hannah
- Cinematography: David Pelletier
- Edited by: Joseph Weadick
- Music by: Zion Lee; Steve Raiman
- Production companies: Alchemist Entertainment; Noble House Film & Television
- Distributed by: Image Entertainment (USA); American World Pictures (AWP) (non-USA)
- Release date: June 21, 2007 (Staten Island Film Festival)
- Running time: 100 minutes
- Country: Canada
- Language: English

The Poet is a 2007 Canadian drama film starring Nina Dobrev, Colm Feore, Roy Scheider, Kim Coates and Daryl Hannah. It was written by Jack Crystal and directed by Damian Lee, with an estimated budget of CAD $11 million. It was released in the United States as Hearts of War.

== Plot ==
In the early days of World War II in Poland, Rachel, a rabbi's daughter, is headed home when she runs into a snow storm and falls unconscious. She is rescued by Oscar Koenig, an officer in the German army working undercover to search out resistance fighters. Over the next few days, Oscar nurses Rachel back to health and in the process the two fall in love, bonding over the poetry that Oscar writes.

German soldiers destroy Rachel's village, killing her family. Oscar helps Rachel and Rachel's fiancé, Bernard, escape into the woods, but he refuses to accompany them, despite Rachel's pleas. Oscar goes back to his daily routine, scouting for his father, General Koenig, with whom Oscar has a rough relationship because of their differing opinions on the war. Oscar seeks comfort in his memories of Rachel, and in his mother, who shares his disenchantment with the war, and encourages him to search for his lost love.

Bernard and Rachel escape into the mountains, where Rachel becomes sick. They find a farm that is hiding other Jews, and discover that Rachel is not ill, she is pregnant with Oscar's child. Regardless of the situation that he's been placed in, Bernard marries Rachel. On the day of their wedding, German soldiers attack and kill everyone hiding in the basement of the farmhouse, but Bernard and Rachel escape and head once more into the woods.

Oscar is redeployed to the Soviet border. Along the road, Oscar, Bernard, and Rachel inadvertently cross paths. Rachel delivers the baby in the woods, and the family of three reach the German camp at the border before Oscar. Bernard gets a job cleaning latrines at the camp, while Rachel becomes a singer/prostitute. Meanwhile, Oscar has been fighting Soviet partisans, trying to get to the camp. When he reaches the camp, Rachel tells him about their son. Oscar begs her to leave with him and to start a new life, so she goes to retrieve their son.

Bernard is playing chess in their tent with a German soldier, when he is sent to clean out an overflowing latrine. Another German soldier takes his place in the game, but loses because he cannot concentrate with the baby crying. In frustration, he lashes out at the baby, killing him, then flees. Rachel returns to the tent a few moments after Bernard and they find the baby dead; they attack and kill the remaining German soldier and flee the camp without telling Oscar.

They are taken in by the Soviet partisans, fighting a mutual enemy. Oscar continues his duties, and when he captures one of the partisans, Rachel and Bernard are given an assignment to kill Oscar. When they see that it's Oscar, Bernard tells Rachel to run to Oscar while he distracts the partisans. Bernard is mortally wounded, while Oscar kills the other partisans. Oscar promises Bernard that he will take care of Rachel. The film ends with Rachel and Oscar grieving over Bernard's body.

== Cast ==
- Jonathan Scarfe as Oscar Koenig
- Nina Dobrev as Rachel
- Zachary Bennett as Bernard
- Kim Coates as General Koenig
- Colm Feore as Colonel Hass
- Roy Scheider as Rabbi
- Daryl Hannah as Marlene Koenig
- Miriam McDonald as Willa

== Reception ==
The Poet received generally poor reviews. Jay Seaver of eFilmCritic said "You're not supposed to laugh at movies like "The Poet" [...] Once the audience is snickering, you've failed. [...] The story [...] is supposed to be grand and tragic". Similarly, Steve Power of DVD Verdict concluded "There are much better films out there that cover similar ground, and Hearts of War is best avoided."
