= Martial Outlaw =

1993 film by Kurt Andersen

- Directed by: Kurt Anderson
- Written by: John Bryant; Pierre David; Thomas Ritz; George Saunders
- Produced by: Pierre David
- Starring: Jeff Wincott; Gary Hudson; Richard Jaeckel
- Cinematography: Jürgen Baum
- Edited by: Michael Thibault
- Music by: Louis Febre
- Distributed by: Image Organization
- Release date: 1993
- Running time: 89 minutes
- Country: United States
- Language: English

Martial Outlaw is a 1993 action/martial arts film written by Thomas Ritz, produced by Pierre David, directed by Kurt Anderson and stars Jeff Wincott, Gary Hudson and Richard Jaeckel in his final film appearance before his death in June 1997. This bomb of a film received a 31% at Rotten Tomatoes.

== Plot ==
DEA agent Kevin White has followed the movements of drug-dealing ex-KGB kingpin Nikolai Radchenko (Vladimir Skomarovsky) from Moscow to San Francisco, then to Los Angeles, where Kevin crosses paths with his older brother Jack, a maverick LAPD cop who attempts to become involved in the operation, placing both brothers' lives at risk from a group of dangerous Soviet martial arts experts.

== Cast ==
- Jeff Wincott as Kevin White
- Gary Hudson as Jack White
- Vladimir Skomarovsky as Nikolai Radchenko
- Krista Errickson as Lori White
- Liliana Komorowska as Marina Cheznikova
- Natasha Pavlovich as Mia Antonova
- Gary Wood as Lt. Evans
- Ari Barak as Andrei Antonov
- Christopher Kriesa as Hal
- Thomas Ritz as Agent Grunsky
- Richard Jaeckel as Mr. White
- Stefanos Miltsakakis as Sergei
- Edi Wilde as Ivan
- Anna Karin as Waitress
- Richard Kwong as Shop Owner
- Ed Moore as Commander Burke
- Christopher Ursitti as San Francisco Agent
- Al Leong as Store Robber (uncredited)
- Will Leong as Stick Fighter (uncredited)
- Leo Lee as Street Thug (uncredited)
