= Ziggy Lorenc =

Canadian television and radio personality

Isabelle Anna "Ziggy" Lorenc (/ˈlɒrəns/ LORR-ənss) is a Canadian television and radio personality as well as occasional actress in film and television, best known for hosting programming on the CHUM Limited-owned television stations Citytv, MuchMusic, and Bravo!, having previously worked for CHUM/City as a receptionist.

== Career ==
Having done modelling work since the age of thirteen, Lorenc began pursuing acting jobs during her late teens. Hanging around Toronto in the late 1970s among a group of aspiring performers including Michael Wincott, Kim Cattrall, Jim Carrey, and Tonya Lee Williams, Lorenc was accepted at the Neighborhood Playhouse School of the Theatre in New York City via an "audition" that consisted of the school's director Sanford Meisner just speaking to the applicants. The New York stay turned out to be short, however, as the budding actress returned to Toronto due to being unable to support herself financially in New York.

While unsuccessfully looking for acting work in Toronto, young Lorenc supplemented her income via Toronto night club gigs, performing live as a "disco bunny", which led to an appearance on Boogie, Citytv's Canadian disco counterpart to the U.S. music-performance and dance television programs American Bandstand and Soul Train. She would soon meet Citytv producer and creative director Moses Znaimer, a connection that by 1980 resulted in a job at the station as a switchboard operator.

=== Citytv ===
While working the switchboard at Citytv's 99 Queen Street East headquarters, Lorenc became part of the Switchettes—a group of young female office staff the station sent around the city of Toronto for promotional activities and even human-interest reporting.

She continued going to acting auditions and soon got a part on the Canadian sketch comedy series Bizarre being shot in Toronto. Asking for time off from her Citytv duties in order to do Bizarre, she got rejected eventually and left Citytv. Her time on Bizarre was short, however, as she got fired after a couple of episodes.

Without both jobs, Lorenc began waitressing at night at Bemelmans, a popular Toronto eatery, while going to acting auditions during the day. She soon got cast as one of the romantic leads in Copper Mountain, a 1983 comedy that was never completed though still got a limited video release, starring Alan Thicke and young impressionist comedian Jim Carrey.

By 1984 she was back in the Citytv fold and was on hand during the launch of Much Music.

Lorenc was also the star/host of the series Life on Venus Ave. She is currently heard on CFZM, hosting a late night program devoted to romantic music.

She also had roles in movies White Room and Love, Sex and Eating the Bones.
