= Angel Eyes (film) =

2001 American romantic drama film by Luis Mandoki

- Theatrical release poster
- Directed by: Luis Mandoki
- Written by: Gerald Di Pego
- Produced by: Mark Canton; Elie Samaha
- Starring: Jennifer Lopez; Jim Caviezel; Sônia Braga; Terrence Howard
- Cinematography: Piotr Sobociński
- Edited by: Gerald B. Greenberg
- Music by: Marco Beltrami
- Production companies: Franchise Pictures; The Canton Company
- Distributed by: Morgan Creek Productions, Inc. (through Warner Bros. Pictures)
- Release date: May 18, 2001
- Running time: 102 minutes
- Country: United States
- Language: English
- Budget: $38 million
- Box office: $29.7 million

Angel Eyes is a 2001 American romantic drama film directed by Luis Mandoki and starring Jennifer Lopez, Jim Caviezel, Sônia Braga, Terrence Howard, and Jeremy Sisto. Written by Gerald Di Pego, the original music score was composed by Marco Beltrami. The film received ALMA Award Nominations for Outstanding Actress (Jennifer Lopez) and Outstanding Director (Luis Mandoki).

The film is about mysterious man Catch, who finds himself drawn to female police officer Sharon Pogue with whom he forms a relationship that helps each to deal with traumas from their pasts.

Angel Eyes was released by Morgan Creek Productions, Inc. (through Warner Bros. Pictures) on May 18, 2001. The film received negative reviews from critics and grossed $29.7 million against a $38 million budget.

== Plot ==
One night in Chicago, police officer Sharon Pogue is at the scene of a traffic accident holding the hand of one of the victims, pleading that he hold on and not give up. One year later, Sharon has become estranged from her family for having her father arrested after he beat her mother. He and her brother have never forgiven her.

A man known only as "Catch" wanders the streets in a trance-like state, doing good deeds for strangers and neighbors. He eventually watches Sharon at a diner from across the street. A car pulls up and opens fire on the diner with a machine gun, Sharon and her partner chase after the suspects. She catches up with one gunman and in the ensuing struggle, he gets her gun. He prepares to shoot Sharon in the head, but Catch tackles him.

That night, Sharon and Catch meet at a tavern and have a drink. During their conversation, he refuses to talk about himself. She invites him to her apartment, and they eventually kiss. Catch abruptly stops and leaves the apartment, leaving Sharon confused.

The next evening, Sharon finds a dandelion taped to her mailbox with Catch's phone number. She calls and invites him to breakfast at a coffee shop the next morning. When Sharon wakes up, she has second thoughts and calls Catch to cancel their date.

Catch is already at the coffee shop so never gets the message. Upset at being stood up, he confronts Sharon at her apartment before storming off. She follows him to his nearly empty apartment. Surprised at his living conditions, Sharon demands to know more about him, but Catch refuses to reveal anything about his past. He only says that he is starting "from scratch".

Following the advice of a woman called Elanora, Catch calls Sharon to apologize, and they continue seeing each other. They go to a lake for a romantic swim and eventually have sex. One night they go to a blues club, and after the band has played a number, Catch notices a trumpet on the bandstand.

Catch picks up the trumpet and starts to play a soulful version of the tune "Nature Boy". As they are leaving, the owner approaches him, calling him "Steve Lambert", and asks where he has been. Catch denies even knowing the man and walks away.

The next day, Sharon investigates Steven Lambert in the police files and discovers that he is the man whose hand she held after the traffic accident, and that his wife and child died in the accident. She goes to the house he abandoned after the accident, learning that he was a jazz musician and that the accident occurred on his son's birthday, causing Catch to create a mental block.

Wanting to help Catch heal from his emotional wounds, Sharon tries to talk to him about the accident, taking him to the cemetery to see the graves of his family, but he gets upset and walks away. She visits Elanora, who is actually Catch's former mother-in-law. Sharon is looking for some way to help Catch; Elanora encourages patience, telling her that he will find his way in his own time.

At her parents' wedding vow renewal ceremony, Sharon tries talking to her father, who tells her that he feels like he does not have a daughter. While starting to leave, she stops and tells the videographer a story about her father playing with her and her brother when they were children. Sharon is moved by this memory. Her father overhears and is also emotionally affected, but when Sharon looks at him, he turns away.

Meanwhile, Catch finally goes to the cemetery and talks to his deceased family, explaining how he remembers the moments they shared. While leaving the reception, Sharon sees him waiting by her car. They embrace and profess their love for each other. As they prepare to leave, Catch tells her that he will drive.

== Cast ==
- Jennifer Lopez as Sharon Pogue
- Jim Caviezel as Steven "Catch" Lambert
- Terrence Howard as Robby
- Jeremy Sisto as Larry Pogue
- Sônia Braga as Josephine Pogue
- Victor Argo as Carl Pogue
- Monet Mazur as Kathy Pogue
- Shirley Knight as Elanora
- Daniel Magder as Larry Jr.
- Guylaine St-Onge as Annie Lambert
- Connor McAuley as Max Lambert
- Jeremy Ratchford as Ray Micigliano
- Peter MacNeill as Lieutenant Dennis Sanderman
- Eldridge Hyndman as Jamal
- Kari Matchett as Candace
- Michael Cameron as Charlie
- Dan Petronijevic as Street Punk
- Dog as Bob

== Production ==
=== Filming ===
Principal photography started on May 8, 2000, and finished in early August that same year. Aaron Eckhart was cast as Steven "Catch" Lambert but left a month before filming began.

=== Filming locations ===
Angel Eyes was filmed in the following locations:

- Chicago, Illinois, USA
- Elora, Ontario, Canada
- Toronto, Ontario, Canada

== Reception ==
=== Critical response ===
Upon its theatrical release, Angel Eyes received negative reviews. On the review aggregator web site Rotten Tomatoes, the film holds a 32% positive rating from critics based on 133 reviews. The site's consensus states: "Though the earlier part of the movie suggested something more, the movie turns out to be nothing more than a schmaltzy romance." Metacritic, which uses a weighted average, assigned the film a score of 39 out of 100, based on 28 critics, indicating "generally unfavorable" reviews. Audiences polled by CinemaScore gave the film an average grade of "B-" on an A+ to F scale.

In his review in the Chicago Sun-Times, Roger Ebert gave the film three of four stars and applauding the performance of Jennifer Lopez, whom he describes as "the real thing, one of those rare actresses who can win our instinctive sympathy. She demonstrates that in Angel Eyes. Ebert noted that although the film is a cop movie, "its real story doesn't involve the police, it involves damaged lives and the possibility that love can heal." Ebert concludes:

Angel Eyes is a complex, evasive romance involving two people who both want to be inaccessible. It's intriguing to see their dance of attraction and retreat. Meanwhile, secrets about both their family situations emerge; credit the screenwriter, Gerald DiPego, for not resolving the standoff with the father with an easy payoff.

In his review in the San Francisco Chronicle, Mick LaSalle called the film "a rare thing—a well-acted character study of a hardworking woman, by a screenwriter (Gerald DiPego) and a director with enough integrity to dispense with the usual Hollywood distractions." LaSalle concluded:

With Angel Eyes, audiences will see a new relaxation in Jennifer Lopez. She takes her time. She really listens. She reacts. She doesn't try to control scenes or control her face. She lets moments happen. Credit director Luis Mandoki, or maturity, or confidence, or an actress' finding the right role. Whatever the reasons, Lopez, who was always competent onscreen, is now an actress who can do things other movie stars can't do. She doesn't push, just thinks, and her thoughts and emotions burn into the film.

In his review in The New York Times, Stephen Holden focused his critique on the casting, writing, "Watching these two share some awkward smooches that are supposed to transport them over the moon is a little like imagining Jane Russell and Montgomery Clift in a steamy clinch." Holden concludes:

Throughout Angel Eyes you are aware of consuming a market-tested product whose eerie atmosphere and tone of bogus solemnity suggest that Mr. Mandoki was given specific instructions to create a hybrid of City of Angels, The Sixth Sense and Frequency. He may have delivered, but the product is so synthetic it has only attitude where its heart ought to be.

=== Box office ===
In North America, the film opened at #4 in its opening weekend and grossed $24,174,218 domestically. All UK versions were cut to obtain a 15-rating. Warner Bros. Pictures had to remove the aggressive use of graphic language or the film would have been rated 18. The film was a box office bomb, ultimately grossing $29,715,606 worldwide, well below its $38 million budget.

=== Awards and nominations ===
- 2002 ALMA Award Nomination for Outstanding Actress in a Motion Picture (Jennifer Lopez)
- 2002 ALMA Award Nomination for Outstanding Director in a Motion Picture (Luis Mandoki)
- 2003 ASCAP Award for Most Performed Song from a Motion Picture for "Good Morning Beautiful" (Todd Cerney, Zachary Lyle) Won
- 2002 Golden Raspberry Award Nomination for Worst Actress (Jennifer Lopez)
