= Law of the Jungle (1995 film) =

1996 film by Damian Lee

- Original release art
- Directed by: Damian Lee
- Written by: Damian Lee
- Produced by: Damian Lee; Jeff Sackman; Jeff Wincott (associate); John Gillespie (associate); Ashok Amritraj (executive)
- Starring: Jeff Wincott Paco Christian Prieto Christina Cox
- Cinematography: Gerald R. Goozee
- Edited by: David Ransley
- Music by: Ronald J. Weiss
- Production companies: Amritraj Entertainment; Richmond House
- Distributed by: Cinépix Film Properties (Canada); Triboro Entertainment (U.S.)
- Release dates: June 30, 1995 (Canada); July 25, 1995 (U.S.)
- Running time: 98 minutes
- Countries: Canada; United States
- Language: English

Law of the Jungle, also known as Jungle Law, is a 1995 Canadian-American martial arts film written, produced and directed by Damian Lee, starring Jeff Wincott, Paco Christian Prieto and Christina Cox. Wincott stars as a lawyer who has fallen on hard times and must fight in underground tournaments organized by a mobster (Prieto) who was once his childhood friend. The film was retitled Street Law for its American release.

== Plot ==
John Ryan, reformed youth offender turned lawyer, gives a lot of his time to pro bono cases, which has caused his finances to dwindle and led him to contract a debt with Larry, a loan shark. While Larry is actually a friend and shows great leniency towards him, the debt attracts the attention of mobster Luis Calderone. Calderone is no stranger to Ryan, as the two were partners in crime during their teenage years, before Ryan left him behind during a police chase, leaving him to bear the consequences of their offense. Now firmly entrenched in a life of crime, Calderone intends to use his underworld connections to hasten Ryan's downfall and get revenge for his perceived betrayal.

Calderone roughs up Larry to force him to sell Ryan's debt, forges the lawyer's credit rating and fabricates connections to several homicides, getting him disbarred and making him homeless. Now in a desperate situation, Ryan is offered a way out: he must participate in an underground fighting circuit run by Calderone. Then, the kingpin ups the ante and attempts to coerce his former friend into becoming a hitman for him. Adding to the tension between the two men is the presence of Kelly, Calderone's girlfriend, with whom Ryan has become infatuated.

== Cast ==
- Jeff Wincott as John Ryan
- Paco Christian Prieto as Luis Calderone
- Christina Cox as Kelly
- Richard Yearwood as Michelangelo
- Michael Copeman as Joe Baker
- Douglas O'Keeffe as Larry the Lender
- Kevin Rushton as Blade
- Raymond Marlowe as Sam Armstrong
- Dennis O'Connor as Carruthers
- David Campbell as Grime
- Nicu Branzea as Tony
- Stephen Micalchunk as Gustavo
- Alessandro Bandiera as Tommy Vega
- Géza Kovács as Andy Giancola

== Production ==
Law of the Jungle was the second of a series of four Wincott vehicles produced and directed by Damian Lee, shortly after The Donor and before No Exit and When the Bullet Hits the Bone. An earlier film, The Killing Machine, also starred Wincott but was directed by Lee's frequent collaborator David Mitchell. As with these other films, Lee provided production services via his company Richmond House, on behalf of Los Angeles-based Amritraj Entertainment. First Ontario Film Distributors, a side company created by Cinépix executive Jeff Sackman to specialize in commercially oriented Ontario-filmed projects, was also involved in the production.

The film pairs Wincott with Mexican Paco Christian Prieto, fresh from the inner city martial arts film Only the Strong. This was a more demanding role, due to the extensive dialogue. Although Prieto—a sought after martial arts trainer—was not actively pursuing acting, he was contacted by an industry acquaintance who had heard of the project and suggested he meet Lee. An agreement was quickly found with the producer. Photography started at the end of September 1994 and continued over part of October. Toronto, Ontario, was the primary filming location, and stands in for New York City. Prieto remembers Wincott being highly invested in the technical aspects of the film's direction, such as choices of camera angles and lenses. The two actors got along well and remained friends after working together. The film was originally called Jungle Law, and that title was retained in some international markets such as Australia.

== Release ==
=== Pre-release ===
Moonstone Entertainment handled the film's international sales. Wincott appeared at the May 1995 Cannes Film Market to promote this film and two of his other works for Amritraj: The Donor and No Exit. The film received a private screening for cast and crew on June 27, 1995, in Toronto.

=== Theatrical ===
In Canada, Law of the Jungle premiered at a Cineplex Odeon theater in Toronto on June 30, 1995. According to a later article, the film was actually screened as Jungle Law during its limited theatrical run, although some contemporary listings indicate otherwise.

=== Home media ===
In Canada, the film was released on VHS as Law of the Jungle through CFP Video, on the week starting July 22, 1995. In the U.S., it debuted through Triboro Entertainment on July 25, 1995, and its title was changed to Street Law, possibly to avoid confusion with another actioner distributed by the company that summer, Jungleground. Triboro concurrently issued the film on LaserDisc in partnership with disc-based media specialists Image Entertainment. Image re-issued it on DVD on September 14, 1999.

== Reception ==
The reception for Law of the Jungle has been largely negative. Writing in the Fort Worth Star-Telegram, Robert Philpot wasn't convinced by the central premise, calling it "totally preposterous", and compared Wincott's new streetwise look to "a cross between Mickey Rourke and Pauly Shore". However, he granted that "its film noir look makes up for a lot" and gave it two and a half stars out of four. In his book A Century of Canadian Cinema, Gerard Fratley was more dismissive, writing that a martial arts-trained lawyer dealing with a loan shark "is one cause that should never have come to court".

TV Guide found the film a disservice to Wincott's career, writing: "On TV, this once personable actor seemed to have a future. But in his direct-to-video flicks, he's nothing more than a big lug with a few judo tricks." Little merit was given to the film's creative aspects, as it was found to be "[h]obbled by flat-footed direction, formulaic screenwriting, and trite tough-guy dialogue". British reviewer John Elliot's Guide to Home Entertainment also found it to be "a badly staged actioner", whose script was "not as inventive" as Wincott's onscreen look.

== Soundtrack ==
The film features three songs by Big Faith, a group produced by and consisting of former Red Rider guitarist Ken Greer and former Chalk Circle singer Chris Tait, backed by the longtime rhythm section for Bruce Cockburn, bassist Fergus Marsh and drummer Michael Sloski. The ending tune "Undertow" was the title track of the band's debut album. The next two films in the Damian Lee/Jeff Wincott collaboration, No Exit and When The Bullet Hits The Bone, were scored by Greer and feature further songs from bands associated with him.
