= Guylaine St-Onge =

Canadian actress

- Born: June 1, 1965; Saint-Eustache, Quebec, Canada
- Died: March 3, 2005 (aged 39); Toronto, Ontario, Canada
- Other name: Guylaine Saint Onge
- Occupations: Actress; Model; Dancer
- Years active: 1988–2003
- Spouse: David Nerman (?–?)

Guylaine St. Onge (June 1, 1965 – March 3, 2005) was a Canadian actress.

== Early life and education ==
Guylaine Saint Onge was born in Saint-Eustache, Quebec. She grew up in Saint-Hyacinthe, and began ballet study when she was four years old. At fourteen, she performed in a dance troupe in Montreal, and later appeared on a local Montreal television show called Lautrec '83 performing ballroom, cha-cha-cha and other Latin dancing.

== Career ==
After working as a model and a dancer, she appeared in the Canadian television series Mount Royal in 1988.

Other television series followed, including a recurring role on the syndicated western drama series Lonesome Dove: The Outlaw Years (1995–96) and a lead role on the Showtime drama series Fast Track (1997–98).

Guest appearances include The Outer Limits in the 1997 episode "Bodies of Evidence", La Femme Nikita in "Threshold of Pain" (1999), and Mutant X in "Whiter Shade of Pale" (2002).

She played the role of Juda during the fifth season of the television series Earth: Final Conflict. She also had a role in the 2001 movie Angel Eyes.

== Personal life and death ==
Her ex-husband is Canadian actor David Nerman, who played "Albert", the manservant in several Philadelphia Cream Cheese commercials. They have a son, Aidan.

In 2005, Guylaine St. Onge died of cervical cancer at the age of 39.

== Filmography ==
=== Film ===
- 1991: Montréal vu par... (segment "Vue d'ailleurs") – La jeune fille
- 1993: Operation Golden Phoenix – Princess Angelica
- 1995: Fatal Combat (No Exit, video) – Carmel Stoneman
- 2000: Full Frontal (short) – Luba, Roman's wife
- 2001: Angel Eyes – Annie Lambert
- 2001: Dead by Monday – Irene Hutchins
- 2002: One Way Out (video) – Evans Farrow
- 2003: Highwaymen – Olivia Cray

=== Television ===
Guylaine St-Onge television credits
Year	Title	Role	Notes	Ref.
1989	Mount Royal	Stéphanie Valeur	16 episodes	
1988	War of the Worlds	Beth	1 episode	
1989	Alfred Hicthcock Presents	Tanya Verushka	1 episode	
1989	The Hitchhiker	Alexandra	1 episode	
1990	Neon Rider	Gabrielle	1 episode	
1991–1992	Lightning Force	Marie Joan Jacquard	13 episodes	
1992	Counterstrike	Dorit	Episode: "D.O.A."	
1993	Matrix	Beautiful Woman	1 episode	
1995	Kung Fu: The Legend Continues	Natalie	1 episode	
1995–1996	Lonesome Dove: The Outlaw Years	Florie	4 episodes	
1997	The Outer Limits	Dr. Helen Dufour	Episode: "Bodies of Evidence" (3.E16)	
1997	Fast Track	Nicole Chandler	22 episodes	
1999	Foolish Heart	Bridgette	1 episode	
1999	La Femme Nikita	Caroline	Episode: "Threshold of Pain" (3.E12)	
2000	Code Name: Eternity	Nathalie Recarrier	1 episode	
2000	Virtual Mom	Anne-Marie	TV movie	
2001	Largo Winch: The Heir	Isaa	TV movie	
2001	Earth: Final Conflict	Serina Sharmo	Episode: "Blood Ties" (S4.E18)	
2001–2002	Earth: Final Conflict	Juda	Season 5	
2002	Mutant X	Danielle Hartman	Episode: "Whiter Shade of Pale" (S1.E11)	
2002	Mary Higgins Clark's Lucky Day	Sandra Keele	TV movie	
2003	Year of the Lion	Unknown	TV movie	
2003	Do or Die	Iona	TV movie	
