= No Exit (1995 film) =

- Original key art
- Directed by: Damian Lee
- Written by: John Lawson; Damian Lee
- Produced by: Damian Lee; Jeff Sackman
- Starring: Jeff Wincott; Sven-Ole Thorsen; Richard Fitzpatrick; Joseph Di Mambro; Guylaine St-Onge
- Cinematography: Russ Goozee
- Edited by: David Ransley
- Music by: Ken Greer
- Production companies: Amritraj Entertainment; Richmond House
- Release date: 1995
- Running time: 96 minutes
- Country: Canada
- Language: English

No Exit is a 1995 Canadian action film directed by Damian Lee, starring Jeff Wincott, Sven-Ole Thorsen, Richard Fitzpatrick, Joseph Di Mambro and Guylaine St-Onge. Wincott stars as an anti-violence academic who ends up killing a man responsible for the loss of his unborn child and is abducted by a millionaire to star in his illegal, fight-to-the-death TV program. In the United States, the film was re-titled Fatal Combat.

== Plot ==
Professor John Stoneman is a militant university professor who teaches his students a philosophy of non-violence, characterized by the refusal to retaliate. However, when he and his pregnant wife Carmel are attacked by thugs in a parking lot, John has no choice but to respond with force. He kills the aggressor, although Carmel loses their baby. The media exposure he receives for his actions grabs the attention of Houston Armstrong, a cynical media mogul who stands for values opposite to Stoneman's, and finances an unsanctioned, gladiatorial program meant to serve as an outlet for man's innately violent tendencies. Armstrong broadcasts his show, called No Exit, via closed-circuit television to high rollers who rent his proprietary signal de-scrambler for $1 million, and guarantees a deadly outcome for the loser.

Armstrong has Stoneman and one of his students, Jason Samuels, abducted on their way to visiting the former's wife at the hospital. Both men are taken to a facility located above the Arctic Circle, and fitted inside a former mine bought from a Canadian crown corporation. The contestants' living quarters are located in there, as well as some of the fighting area, which extends to the surrounding frozen outdoors, where the television crew can follow the contestants thanks to a fleet of hovercraft. Under the watchful eye of Armstrong's right-hand man Tayback, Stoneman meets the other contestants, including the sympathetic Aaron "Doc" Smithers, a former football player who has been assigned to the complex's infirmary. But the most feared of all is Darcona, an escaped cop killer and No Exit's top star, who has won the last three tournaments and survived for more than a year thanks to his savage behavior.

== Cast ==
- Jeff Wincott as Professor John Stoneman
- Sven-Ole Thorsen as Darcona
- Richard Fitzpatrick as Armstrong
- Joseph Di Mambro as Jason Samuels
- Guylaine St-Onge as Carmel Stoneman
- Phillip Jarrett as Doc
- Douglas O'Keeffe as Tayback
- Kerry Harris as Mr. Kerry
- Dennis O'Connor as Doctor
- David Fraser as Dave
- Jason Weinberg as Hank
- David Campbell as Henry

== Production ==
The film was the penultimate in a series of four Wincott vehicles produced and directed by Damian Lee, shortly after The Donor and Law of the Jungle, and before When the Bullet Hits the Bone. An earlier film, The Killing Machine, also starred Wincott but was directed by Lee's frequent collaborator David Mitchell. No Exit was filmed during parts of February and March 1995 in the region of Toronto, Ontario. As with these other projects, Lee provided production services via his company Richmond House, on behalf of Los Angeles-based Amritraj Entertainment.

The film, which the Chicago Tribune said "displays some thematic links to the Arnold Schwarzenegger picture The Running Man", features Sven-Ole Thorsen, who had previously appeared in that work, as well as played the main antagonist in Lee's 1990 film Abraxas, Guardian of the Universe. Like Jeff Wincott, Toronto-based sidekick actor Joseph Di Mambro possessed real-life Taekwondo experience. Although the script credited his character with a third-degree black belt for dramatic purpose, Di Mambro still claimed a solid red belt in real life and performed all of his stunts. He described Wincott as very enjoyable to work with.

== Release ==
=== Pay-per-view ===
In the United States, the film premiered on pay-per-view prior to its home video debut, appearing on December 1, 1996, on various national services such as Cable Video Store, and Hot Choice, as well as a variety of regional providers. It was renamed Fatal Combat.

=== Home video ===
In Canada, No Exit was released on VHS by Cinépix's CFP Video on August 13, 1996. In the U.S., the film arrived on VHS via Columbia TriStar Home Video on January 21, 1997. As on pay-per-view, it did so under the title Fatal Combat.

== Reception ==
No Exit received mixed to negative reviews. Writing for TV Guide and sister publication The Motion Picture Annual, Robert Pardi found Wincott as limited as other action specialists such as Sylvester Stallone, Dolph Lundgren, Jean-Claude Van Damme, and pointed to the purported hypocrisy of the film's anti-violence stance, saying: "Since Wincott is a superb athlete, his fans may welcome this tedious trip to a death arena. But even diehard Wincott followers won't be fooled by the conspicuously shallow intercutting of flashbacks and flash-forwards, all leading to the same bloody conclusion: might makes right." Ballantine Books' Video Movie Guide was not much impressed either, although it was more amicable towards its leading man, assessing that this "[u]ltimately tedious Mortal Kombat/Street Fighter ripoff is buoyed somewhat by the undeniable video presence of star Jeff Wincott."

British reference book Elliot's Guide to Home Entertainment was slightly more positive, calling it "[y]et another variant on The Most Dangerous Game, although this one is for the most part effective. In his opus The American Martial Arts Film, M. Ray Lott called the fights "extremely well choreographed, with the northern tundra serving as a backdrop for the combat, and a metaphor for the hopelessness of the fighters trapped in this endless cycle of violence."

Aspects of the film are discussed and compared with other examples of the genre in the 2020 book Are You Not Entertained? Mapping the Gladiator Across Visual Media by British popular cinema academic Lindsay Steenberg.

== Soundtrack ==
The film's score was composed by former Red Rider member Ken Greer, who went on to work on When the Bullet Hits the Bone shortly after. The soundtrack also features several catalogue tracks, such as the Red Rider instrumental "Saved by the Dawn" and "Songs about Peace" by Hunter/Greer, the composer's then current project with former Refugee vocalist Myles Hunter. Additionally, Hunter and Greer penned an original theme song for the film, No Exit, whose vocals are performed by former Talas singer Phil Naro.
