= Freedom (NCIS) =

- NCIS episode
- Episode no.: Season 8 Episode 13
- Directed by: Craig Ross, Jr.
- Written by: Nicole Mirante-Matthews
- Original air date: February 1, 2011

Guest appearances
- Brian Dietzen as Jimmy Palmer; Christina Cox as Marine Gunnery Sergeant Georgia Wooten; Thomas Calabro as Len Feeney; Olivia Taylor Dudley as Jancey Gilroy; Aaron D. Spears as Marine Major Michael Strickland; Tiya Sircar as Lauren Donnelly; Matthew Florida as Kyle Severin; Aramis Knight as Nick Miller; Aiden Sussman as Jacob Wooten

Episode chronology
← Previous "Recruited"	Next → "A Man Walks Into a Bar..."
- NCIS season 8

"Freedom" is the 13th episode of the eighth season of the American police procedural drama NCIS, and the 175th episode overall. It originally aired on CBS in the United States on February 1, 2011. The episode is written by Nicole Mirante-Matthews and directed by Craig Ross, Jr., and was seen by 22.85 million viewers.

"Freedom" was the most watched episode of NCIS at the time, surpassing the record of 21.93 million viewers reached earlier in 2011. It was later surpassed by the season ten episode "Shiva", which was watched by 22.86 million viewers.

== Plot ==
The team investigates the murder of a marine who was beaten to death in his backyard. They find out his Marine wife Georgia Wooten (Christina Cox) was abused and that the husband had an affair. She is initially suspected and remains uncooperative throughout the investigation. At one point, Ducky suggests sending Ziva to talk to Wooten, noting that the former had "been through things you and I can't even imagine" and knew how it felt to be controlled, and was therefore the only one who could relate. Gibbs is reluctant to open Ziva's old wounds but ultimately complies. Wooten, however, denies that she was responsible for her husband's death.

The team finds numerous suspects, including the murder victim's pregnant girlfriend, but eventually narrow it down to a bar owner who was a friend of the wife. He admits to the murder because he felt the marine didn't deserve to have a wife like her.

Meanwhile, McGee becomes the victim of identity theft, as somebody starts using his credit card to buy various expensive items. Tony tracks down the identity thief, who turns out to be the son of McGee's landlady. The boy remarks that he stole McGee's identity because he felt he was too boring and didn't take time to enjoy life. Also, since the purchases were clearly the result of fraud, McGee is only liable for $50. Together, Tony and the boy manage to convince McGee to come with them to buy video games.

== Production ==
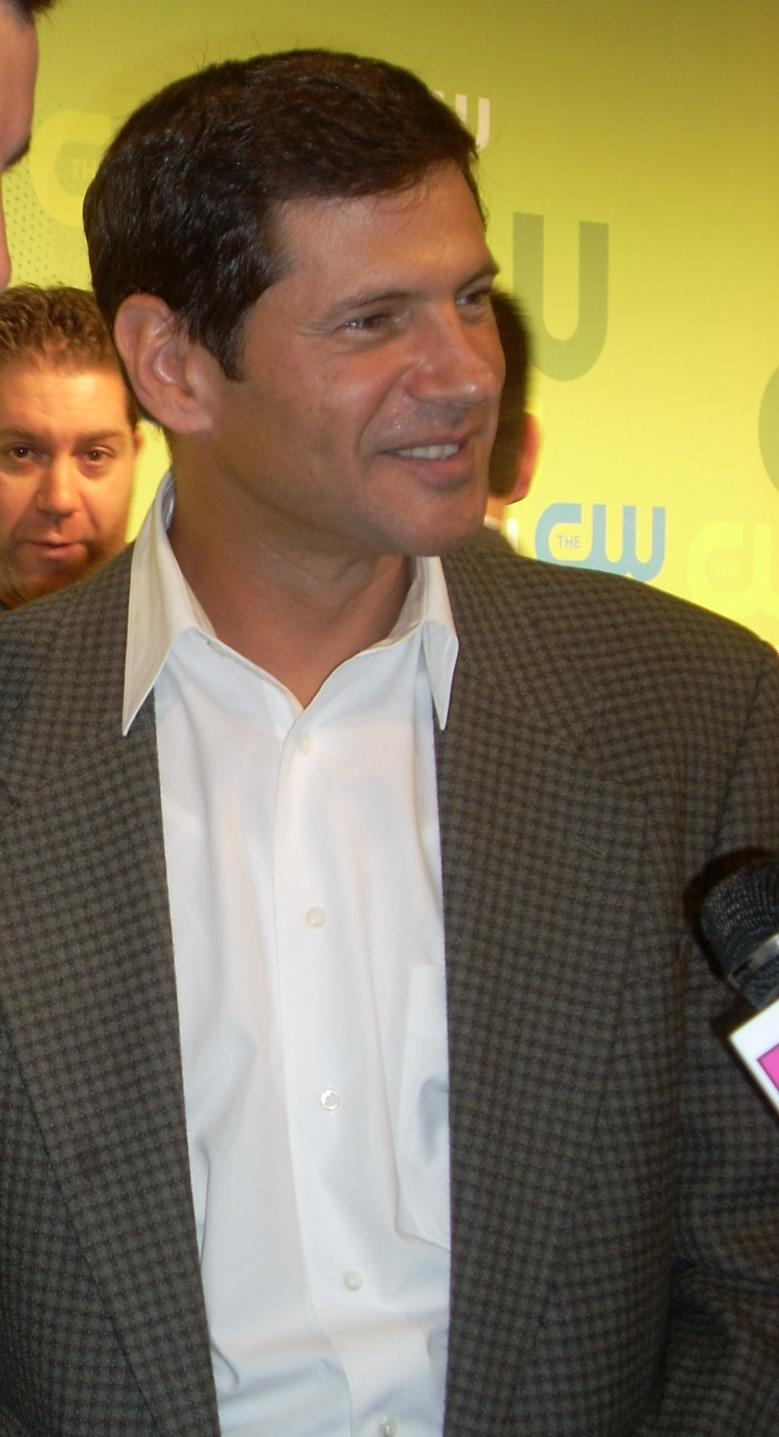
Thomas Calabro guest starred as Len Feeney in "Freedom".

"Freedom" is written by Nicole Mirante-Matthews and directed by Craig Ross, Jr. This is Mirante-Matthews's second episode on NCIS. "For my second episode, I wanted to tell a powerful, compelling story with an indestructible female Marine at the center. A Marine who would stop at nothing to defend her country, but had no idea how to defend herself." Ross, Jr. hasn't directed episodes on NCIS before, and this is his first and only episode on the show.

== Reception ==
"Freedom" was seen by 22.85 million live viewers following its broadcast on February 1, 2011, with a 13.2/20 share among all households, and 4.6/12 share among adults aged 18 to 49. A rating point represents one percent of the total number of television sets in American households, and a share means the percentage of television sets in use tuned to the program. In total viewers, "Freedom" easily won NCIS and CBS the night as the episode became the most watched in the history of the series (not surpassed until "Shiva" almost 2 years later). The spin-off NCIS: Los Angeles drew second and was seen by 17.70 million viewers.

As a result of the series high in viewers, CBS renewed the show for its 9th season on February 2, 2011. "It’s simply amazing that a show in its eighth season continues to perform at such an elite level", CBS Entertainment president Nina Tassler said. Also, Mark Harmon renewed his contract for two years the following day, making him the first one of the cast without contract for season 9 to do so. NCIS was the only series renewed by CBS for the next season by February 2, 2011.

Steve Marsi from TV Fanatic gave the episode 4.0 (out of 5) and stated that "As far as the murder mystery, 'Freedom' was fairly boilerplate stuff, lacking a bit of the urgency and some of the lightning-quick twists we've grown accustomed to. By accustomed, we mean spoiled of course. As they say (or at least I do), an average episode of NCIS is still better than a good installment of almost anything else...What was most intriguing about the case was not the evidence or the unfolding mystery but the fact that this powerful woman, a Marine martial arts trainer, was an abuse victim. Sounds like someone we know. Ziva opened up to Georgia about similar abuse she suffered and made some inroads, although this could have been extrapolated upon further. It seemed like a prime opportunity for Ziva's character to shine - relating to a suspect similarly strong, powerful, yet vulnerable - but the plot quickly moved in other directions. Flashes of the old Ziva are better than nothing, I guess."
