= The Donor =

- Canadian release visual
- Directed by: Damian Lee
- Written by: Neal H. Dobrofsky; Tippi Dobrofsky
- Produced by: Damian Lee; Jeff Wincott (Associate); Ashok Amritraj (Executive); Kathryn Cass (Executive)
- Starring: Jeff Wincott; Michelle Johnson Gordon Thomson Christina Cox
- Cinematography: Gerald R. Goozee
- Edited by: David Ransley
- Music by: Ronald J. Weiss
- Production companies: Amritraj Entertainment; Richmond House
- Distributed by: Cinépix Film Properties (Canada); Imperial Entertainment/WarnerVision (U.S.)
- Release dates: April 1995 (Canada); September 19, 1995 (U.S.)
- Running time: 94 minutes
- Countries: Canada; United States
- Language: English

The Donor is a 1995 Canadian-American thriller film produced and directed by Damian Lee, starring Jeff Wincott and Michelle Johnson. Inspired by a popular urban legend, it features Wincott as a man searching for one of his kidneys, which has been stolen from him following a one-night stand.

== Plot ==
Billy Castle is a professional stuntman with a penchant for risky behavior. While on a bungee jumping trip, he gets drunk with his friends Mike and Eric at a bar, where he notices an attractive female customer being harassed by another patron. Castle promptly disables the man, which leads to a conversation, and ultimately a sexual encounter, with the woman, who claims to be from Norway and named Angel. When he wakes up in the morning, Castle is horrified to find that one of his kidneys has been surgically removed. He is taken to the hospital and hurriedly interrogated by a police detective named Como, who suggests that Castle's friends, who left their vacation spot without him, may be implicated. The conversation is cut short by resident doctor Lucy Flynn, who examines the wound and reveals matter-of-factly that the nephrectomy has been performed by a skilled professional. On his way out, Castle meets another doctor, the more cordial Jonathan Cross, who has some words of support.

While attempt to resume a normal life, Castle periodically contacts Webster, the Sheriff of the resort where he was assaulted. The latter has little progress to relay in the following weeks, so he decides to go back there and confront him. He learns that the woman he knew as Angel is actually Karen Nordhoff, the daughter of a local well-to-do family who the Sheriff was reluctant to expose. Castle confronts Nordhoff, who claims she was paid to make him drink by a man she never met in person and who pretended to be a friend of his. Castle visits the small town's liquor stores to trace buyers of the Champagne bottle given to Nordhoff, and finds a past customer with a credit card to the name of Dr. Armand Perris.

During a routine checkup, Flynn discovers that Castle's sutures have become infected. She cuts them open and finds that the issue was caused by a contact lens stuck inside the wound. Meanwhile, at a random bar, an unknown woman is shown seducing one of the patrons, and taking him to her hotel room where he gets sedated much like Castle. Two men enter the room and dress the bed like a surgery table, before two masked surgeons start operating on him. This time, however, the patient dies during the surgery. One of the two surgeons, a woman, shows regret for what happened but she is struck by the other one, who remains unseen, before the room is cleaned and emptied of the corpse.

Castle tracks down Dr. Perris at an academic gathering and confronts him, but he swears his credit card has been stolen and reveals that he is in fact a Doctor in literature. Perris threatens to call security. Dr. Cross, who is an acquaintance of Perris, recognizes Castle and smooths out the situation. He also warns him that should the transplant of his first kidney fail, his attackers might strike again to procure a second one. Castle is still briefly detained for his intrusion, and his friend Mike bails him out. As he exits the police headquarters, he notices that his friend has treated himself to a luxury sedan. Although he was initially reluctant to seek psychiatric help, Castle has seen both his hedonistic lifestyle drastically altered by his rehabilitation, and agrees to meet with a support group recommended by Flynn and headed by assault survivor Cassie. But as he exits the meeting, he nearly gets run over by an unknown car, leaving him certain that his personal investigation has made him a target. When the police refuse to hear his plight, Castle confides to Flynn, for whom he has slowly developed feelings.

== Cast ==
- Jeff Wincott as Billy Castle
- Michelle Johnson as Dr. Lucy Flynn
- Gordon Thomson as Dr. Jonathan Cross
- Christina Cox as Angel
- Amanda Tapping as Cassie
- Richard Zeppieri as Eric Anderson
- Joseph Scorsiani as Mike French
- Tony Nappo as Joe
- Geza Kovacs as Detective Como
- Robert Collins as Sheriff Webster
- Falconer Abraham as Daryl Chambers
- Doug O'Keeffe as Tom Spikes
- Emmanuelle Chriqui as Patty

== Production ==
At the March 1994 American Film Market, The Donor was announced with Andrew Stevens, a frequent collaborator of executive producer Ashok Amritraj, attached to direct, and Sasha Mitchell slated to star. Production was scheduled to commence mid-April of that year. The second incarnation, with Canadians Damian Lee and Jeff Wincott now replacing them, was billed as the first project of First Ontario Film Distributors, a company dealing in commercial films and spun off from Cinépix Film Properties (then Cinépix/Famous Players) by their top executive Jeff Sackman to take advantage of provincial incentives that C/FP, unlike some of its competitors, was ineligible for. Michelle Johnson returned from the recent Amritraj production Illicit Dreams

The Donor was shot between July 5 and July 26, 1994. After The Killing Machine, which was directed by frequent Lee collaborator David Mitchell in late 1993, it marked the beginning of a series of four new Wincott starrers directed by Lee in the span of just one year. It was quickly followed by Law of the Jungle, while No Exit and When the Bullet Hits the Bone—the latter another medical thriller co-starring Johnson—were made in 1995. As with other films in this informal series, Lee provided production services via his Toronto-based company Richmond House.

== Release ==
=== Pre-release ===
International distribution rights to the film were pre-sold to MCEG Sterling in 1994. The film was screened for industry professionals at the March 1995 American Film Market. Wincott appeared at the May 1995 Cannes Film Market to promote this film and two of his other works for Amritraj: Law of the Jungle and No Exit.

=== Theatrical ===
In its native Canada, it was announced that The Donor would premiere theatrically in Toronto in the week starting April 14, 1995.

=== Home media ===
In Canada, the film debuted on VHS through CFP Video on June 27, 1995. In the United States, the film's rights had been pre-sold to Prism Entertainment, but it was eventually released by Imperial Entertainment and WarnerVision Entertainment on September 19, 1995.

== Reception ==
The BBC's Radio Times gave a moderately positive assessment of the film, opining: "In this flawed yet intriguing thriller, [Wincott] gets the chance to flex something other than his muscles [...] The story stretches credibility, but director Damian Lee powers the action in robust fashion." Halliwell's Film Guide was less kind, saying: "Part action film, part psychological thriller; neither works — the action sequences include a bicycle chase, and script and acting aren't up to emotional depth. Blockbuster Entertainment's Guide to Movies and Videos was also unimpressed, and dismissed The Donor as an "ineffective thriller with an unconvincing series of last-reel twists".

== See also ==
- The Harvest, a 1993 film starring Miguel Ferrer, which uses a similar premise
- Pound of Flesh, a 2015 film starring Jean-Claude Van Damme, which uses a similar premise
