= Copper Mountain (film) =

- DVD cover
- Written by: Damian Lee; David Mitchell
- Directed by: David Mitchell
- Starring: Jim Carrey; Alan Thicke
- Music by: Brian Bell
- Original language: English

Production
- Producers: Damian Lee; David Mitchell
- Cinematography: Alar Kivilo
- Editors: James Lahti; Mairin Wilkinson
- Running time: 60 minutes

Original release
- Release: July 7, 1983

Copper Mountain (a Club Med Experience) (also known as just Copper Mountain) is a 1983 Canadian comedy television film, written and directed by Damian Lee and David Mitchell, produced for CTV Television Network, that premiered on First Choice TV network. Starring Jim Carrey and Alan Thicke, it is a "thinly-veiled" quasi-commercial for the now-defunct Club Med ski resort in Copper Mountain, Colorado. The majority of the runtime consists of rom-com plot interspersed with performances by country and rock and roll musicians, Ronnie Hawkins, Rita Coolidge and Chicago frontman Bill Champlin, with whom TV theme song writer Thicke co-wrote the song "Sara".

== Plot ==
Two friends, Bobby Todd (Carrey) and Jackson Reach (Thicke), travel from their hometown of Grimsby to the Club Med village in Copper Mountain. Jackson intends to hit the ski slopes and compete in a ProAm, while Bobby comically struggles to connect to women, with impressions and routines. Eventually, Jackson places second in a ProAm challenge race, and Bobby finds companionship by being himself.

== Cast ==
- Jim Carrey as Bobby Todd
- Alan Thicke as Jackson Reach
- Jean-Claude Killy as himself
- Richard Gautier (credited as Dick Gautier) as Sonny Silverton, ski event promoter
- Ziggy Lorenc (credited as Ziggy Laurence) as Michelle
- Rod Hebron as Yogi Hebadaddy
- Jean Laplac as Chef de Village
- Damian Lee, the film’s co-writer and co-producer, appears as Helicopter Guide

== Musicians ==
The film has on-screen song performances, by Ronnie Hawkins, of songs written by John Fogerty, for Creedence Clearwater Revival, including Lodi.

Rita Coolidge sings the cover songs "One Fine Day" and "The Way You Do the Things You Do", and performs her 1977 top-ten hit "We're All Alone".

Bill Champlin sings the Alan Thicke—Bill Champlin song, "Sara".

Jim Carrey (as Bobby Todd) sings with the band the song "Mr. Bojangles" in the style of Sammy Davis Jr..

The musicians, appear alone, and together in groups, singing on a hillside stage and in the facility’s nightclub. The musicians include:

- Ronnie Hawkins – vocals
- Rita Coolidge – vocals
- Bill Champlin – keyboard, vocals
- Tamara Champlin – vocals
- Steve Sexton – keyboards
- Mike Utley – keyboards
- Danny Marks – guitar
- David James – drums
- Brian Bell – bass guitar
- Jon Bojicic – rhythm guitar

== Reception ==
"a ski resort infomercial dressed up as a buddy comedy" — Night Flight

"30 minutes of musical performances" — McElroy

"regrettable" — The Denver Post
