= Life on Venus Ave. =

Life on Venus Ave. is a Canadian television series, which aired on MuchMusic and Citytv in the 1990s. Hosted by Ziggy Lorenc, the series mixed informational and comedic segments on love and sex with romantic music videos.

The series premiered in 1991, as an updated version of Lorenc's earlier romantic video series MushMusic. The series concept was that Lorenc was actually an extraterrestrial being from the planet Venus, and was learning about human concepts of love and sexuality.

The series was dropped from MuchMusic in 1994 when Lorenc left that network, but continued on Citytv until 1996. Lorenc subsequently published the memoir Life on Venus Ave. (and other true confessions of a wash 'n' wear virgin) in 1997.

One of the show's writers, Rod Gonsalves-Quesnel, went on to write a fashion column for The Globe and Mail.
