= Last Man Standing (1995 film) =

1995 film by Joseph Merhi

- Original release art
- Directed by: Joseph Merhi
- Written by: Joseph Merhi
- Produced by: Joseph Merhi; Richard Pepin; Scott McAboy (co-producer); Jeff Wincott (co-producer)
- Starring: Jeff Wincott; Jillian McWhirter; Jonathan Fuller; Jonathan Banks
- Cinematography: Ken Blakey
- Edited by: Ron Cabreros; Chris Worland
- Music by: Louis Febre
- Production company: PM Entertainment Group
- Distributed by: PM Entertainment Group
- Release date: September 1995
- Running time: 96 minutes
- Country: United States
- Language: English

Last Man Standing is a 1995 American action film written, produced and directed by Joseph Merhi, starring Jeff Wincott, Jillian McWhirter, Jonathan Fuller and Jonathan Banks. Wincott and McWhirter star as a cop and his banker wife, caught in a crossfire between a gang of robbers who clean Los Angeles' vaults and the husband's corrupt colleagues, who are in league with the bandits.

== Plot ==
A series of violent robberies, perpetrated by the sinister "Snake" Underwood and his crew, has Southern California law enforcement on edge. Detective Kurt Bellmore and his partner "Doc" Kane are called for a disturbance at a high rise hotel, which turns out to be a contentious meeting between Snake and one of his associates over the split of their latest bank haul. A gunfight and chase ensue, which end in Snake's capture. During a conversation between the two cops and their superior, Lieutenant Darnell Seagrove, Bellmore asks about the whereabouts of some $200,000 in cash, which Snake left behind when he fled his hotel suite. Seagrove argues that the impounded amount was no more than a few thousands, which makes Bellmore openly suspicious.

It is revealed that Seagrove is in fact dirty, and taking a cut of Snake's robbery money in exchange for protection. That evening, Bellmore and Doc are called to an isolated industrial complex, where a gang assault is in progress. Doc is taken hostage by one of the thugs, but Seagrove arrives on the scene and opens fire, using the cover of a hostage crisis gone wrong to get rid of Doc. Shortly after, Snake is freed from detention thanks to Seagrove's interference, and summons the latter to demand that Bellmore be eliminated as well. Meanwhile, he will move on to his next heist which, unbeknownst to him, happens to target the bank employing Bellmore's wife Anabella.

== Cast ==
- Jeff Wincott as Det. Kurt Bellmore
- Jillian McWhirter as Anabella Bellmore
- Jonathan Fuller as "Snake" Underwood
- Steve Eastin as Lt. Darnell Seagrove
- Robert LaSardo as Kazz
- Jonathan Banks as Det. Frank "Doc" Kane
- Michael Greene as Capt. Demayo
- Ava Fabian as Lucretia
- Shannon Welles as Mrs. Kane
- Sam Shamshak as Bob Parry

== Production ==
Last Man Standing was shot during parts of August and September 1994. It was touted as an example of the higher budgeted movies enabled by PM Entertainment's recent move to larger facilities in Sun Valley. Most of its standout scenes took place in Long Beach, California. The initial encounter between Bellmore and "Snake" Underwood, and subsequent high fall, were shot at the Hyatt Regency hotel. The climax of the chase between the two Corvettes was captured on the Queensway Bridge. The film, including its pivotal armored truck chase, was also the first of several by PM to use the city's Shoreline Drive, which had been seen in films such as Speed.

The highway was not among stock locations offered by California's Department of Transportation, which were deemed barren and underwhelming. But after PM's location scouts visited Shoreline Drive, they saw the unique value offered by such a wide road, built against a rich urban backdrop and where explosions could be staged. Thanks to its six-lane design and comparatively light traffic, Long Beach authorities had no problem closing four lanes for five days, rerouting the cars towards the remaining two. Due to the city's desire to lure the entertainment industry, the service was billed no more than the standard $400-a-day charged for a film permit.

Last Man Standing was the first PM project where stunt coordinator duties were assigned to future company regular Spiro Razatos, who also served as second unit co-director. The scene where Bellmore is dragged through the highway by an armored truck is one of Razatos' signature stunts. While Wincott was used to doing a large part of his fight scenes himself, he was not used to action on this scale, and admitted to being apprehensive during the filming of a scene where he and co-star Jillian McWhirter had to stand just 50 feet away from an exploding barn. Wincott mentioned that 35 stunt cars were used for the film, while the Los Angeles Times said that more than two dozens were detonated.

== Release ==
Last Man Standing was originally slated for a February 1995 release, and an HBO premiere was also considered. However, by the summer of 1995, the street date was still up in the air. It was not released domestically until January 23, 1996, when PM Entertainment Group put it out on VHS tape. The first major Anglophone market the film appeared in was Australia. There, the film was released by Entcorp on August 10, 1995, with the September 4 edition of the Sydney Morning Herald reporting that the film had cracked the rentals Top 5 at the paper's partnering location. The film was re-issued on DVD on May 4, 2004, by Kreative Digital Entertainment via Universal Music & Video Distribution, as part of a slate of PM Entertainment releases.

== Reception ==
Last Man Standing is often regarded as a defining example of the 1990s era of independent action films primarily made for the home video and cable markets. In VideoHound's Video Premieres, Mike Mayo called it "a near perfect video action flick", adding that "the whole film is a lot more enjoyable than many of its big screen counterparts". Writing in VideoScope, veteran genre critic Joe Kane opined that "the action specialists at PM—the guys who put the car in carnage—again deliver big screen thrills on a home vid budget." In his book The American Martial Arts Film, M. Ray Lott writes that "Wincott gives another outstanding performance" and that "[g]ood chemistry between [him] and veteran character actor Jonathan Banks distinguishes this film". Ballantine Books' Video Movie Guide concurred, calling it a "smartly directed" movie where "[g]reat action sequences and stunts are enhanced by better-than-average screenplay and performances."

== Soundtrack ==
Last Man Standing: Original Motion Picture Soundtrack

Film score by Louis Febre
- Released: April 21, 2020
- Genre: Orchestral
- Length: 54:10
- Label: BSX Records
- Producer: Louis Febre

Last Man Standing's original score was composed and produced by Louis Febre. It was digitally released by BSX Records, the sister label of film music retailer BuySoundtrax, on April 21, 2020. It is accompanied by a downloadable booklet.

Track listing
No.	Title	Length
1.	"Last Man Standing – Opening"	3:19
2.	"Hotel Shootout"	4:39
3.	"Flowers and Romance"	2:05
4.	"Chemical Plant and Doc's Death"	4:38
5.	"Tears for Doc"	1:46
6.	"Bank Heist and Freeway Chase"	10:44
7.	"Garage Shootout"	3:07
8.	"A Wife's Loyalty"	1:04
9.	"Barnhouse Goes Boom"	2:48
10.	"Doc's Book on Tape"	1:14
11.	"Driving to the Strip Club: Hit on Underwood"	1:57
12.	"Strip Club Firefight and Car Chase"	6:03
13.	"Subway Shootout"	6:08
14.	"Last Man Standing – End Credits"	4:37
Total length:		54:10
