= Lightning Force =

- Starring: Matthew Walker; Wings Hauser; Guylaine St-Onge; David Stratton; Marc Gomes
- Composer: Schaun Tozer
- Country of origin: United States
- Original language: English
- No. of seasons: 1
- No. of episodes: 22

Production
- Executive producers: Lewis B. Chesler; David Perlmutter
- Production companies: Crescent Entertainment; Chesler-Perlmutter Productions; Viacom Enterprises

Original release
- Network: Syndication
- Release: 1991 – 1992

Lightning Force is an American action television series starring Matthew Walker, Wings Hauser and Guylaine St-Onge that aired in syndication. The series premiered in 1991 and went off in 1992, in all 22 episodes were produced.

== Synopsis ==
Lightning Force was an elite military team formed by members of the International Oversight Committee for Anti-Terrorism. Each team member had special skills that helped them on their missions.

== Cast ==
- Wings Hauser as LT. Col Matthew 'Trane' Coltrane
- Marc Gomes as Col. Zaid 'Zeke' Abdul-Rahmad
- Guylaine St-Onge as Marie 'Joan' Jacquard
- David Stratton as LT. Winston Churchill 'Church' Staples
- Matthew Walker as Maj. Gen Bill McHugh
