= The Undertaker's Wedding =

- Directed by: John Bradshaw
- Written by: John Bradshaw
- Produced by: Nicolas Stiliadis
- Starring: Adrien Brody; Jeff Wincott; Kari Wuhrer
- Cinematography: Edgar Egger
- Edited by: Ron Wisman
- Music by: Varouje
- Distributed by: S Entertainment
- Release date: August 27, 1997 (Montreal)
- Running time: 85 minutes
- Countries: United States; Canada
- Languages: English; Italian

The Undertaker's Wedding is a 1997 Canadian-American crime comedy film written and directed by John Bradshaw and starring Adrien Brody, Jeff Wincott and Kari Wuhrer.

== Cast ==
- Adrien Brody as Mario Bellini
- Jeff Wincott as Rocco Strachitella
- Kari Wuhrer as Maria Strachitella
- Burt Young as Alberto Strachitella
- Holly Gagnier as Louise
- Nicholas Pasco as Michael Caprelli
- Anna Giannotti as Mrs. Bellini

== Release ==
The film was shown at the Montreal World Film Festival on August 27, 1997.

== Reception ==
TV Guide gave the film a positive review: "What The Undertaker's Wedding lacks in big laughs, it compensates for with sheer likability."
