= When the Bullet Hits the Bone =

1996 film by Damian Lee

- Final American cover art
- Directed by: Damian Lee
- Written by: Damian Lee
- Produced by: Helder Goncalves; Julian Grant; Damian Lee
- Starring: Jeff Wincott Michelle Johnson Douglas O'Keeffe Torri Higginson
- Cinematography: Gerald R. Goozee
- Edited by: David Ransley
- Music by: Ronald J. Weiss
- Production companies: Amritraj Entertainment; Richmond House
- Distributed by: Cinépix Film Properties (Canada); New Horizons Home Video (U.S.)
- Release dates: April 9, 1996 (Canada); March 17, 1998 (U.S.)
- Running time: 93 minutes (original); 82 minutes (New Horizons VHS)
- Countries: Canada; United States
- Language: English

When the Bullet Hits the Bone is a 1996 Canadian-American action thriller film written, produced and directed by Damian Lee, starring Jeff Wincott, Michelle Johnson, Douglas O'Keeffe and Torri Higginson. It concerns a doctor who turns vigilante after nearly dying in a gang-related shooting, only to discover a vast conspiracy linking the government to the importation of narcotics. In the U.S., it was broadcast as part of the Showtime anthology Roger Corman Presents.

== Plot ==
Mentally affected by the aftermath of drug-induced violence he had been witnessing at his hospital; emergency doctor Jack Davies errs in the streets of New York in a drunken stupor. He happens upon a quarrel between a man, a woman and a group of mob henchmen who seem to chaperone her. The unknown man gets shot dead. Davies, who is deemed an undesirable witness, gets shot as well when he fails to answer a history question asked by Daemon, the lead henchman and a sadist who likes to torment his victims with increasingly difficult trivia before he kills them. However, he miraculously survives. As he lay in the street bleeding, Davies has an epiphany and decides to drop his identification cards into a nearby manhole, so as to become anonymous and signify the end of his previous life.

Meanwhile, the woman is taken back by her chaperons to drug baron Nick Turner, who keeps her in check by threatening her young daughter. Later, Turner informs Daemon that Davies has survived and sends his men to the hospital to terminate him for good. It is revealed that Turner is a drug baron so powerful that he deals directly with senators. He wants them to pass a law that will de-penalize drugs and increase his business, and he does not hesitate to use violence against one of them when he refuses to support the initiative. Turner's men arrive at the hospital, but Davies manages to escape the hospital under a hail of bullets with the help of a cooperative nurse named Allison.

Allison nurses Davies back to health, falling in love with him in the process. But the latter remains haunted by questions surrounding the altercation that nearly left him dead, and the woman who was at the center of it. However, the mobsters still haven't given up on eliminating Davies, and Allison gets killed in a drive-by shooting intended for him. Now hell bent for vengeance, the mild-mannered doctor gets into vigilante mode to get to the men responsible for his predicament.

== Cast ==
- Jeff Wincott as Jack Davies
- Michelle Johnson as Lisa
- Douglas O'Keeffe as Nick Turner
- Richard Fitzpatrick as Senator Striker
- Torri Higginson as Allison Doherty
- Phillip Jarrett as Trevor
- Roy Lewis as Daemon
- Howard Jerome as Senator Rollins
- Jennifer Pisana as Marie
- Jack Jessop as Jack Davies Sr.
- Eileen Sword as Mrs. Davies
- Jason Barbeck as Lucas
- Matthew Bennett as Trask
- Malcolm Xerxes as Clarence

== Production ==
When the Bullet Hits the Bone was filmed during parts of June and July 1995 in Toronto, Ontario, which stands in for New York City. It was the fourth and last in a series of films shot in quick succession (although not consecutively) by Wincott for producer/director Damian Lee between July 1994 and July 1995, following The Donor, Law of the Jungle and No Exit. An earlier film, The Killing Machine, was produced by Lee and directed by his close associate David Mitchell in late 1993. As with other films in that informal series, Lee's Toronto-based company Richmond House provided production services. Los Angeles-based Ashok Amritraj receives an executive producer on the boxcovers of the Canadian and U.S. tapes, but not in the film itself where he is only listed as a presenter, and frequent collaborator Alan Bursteen is listed as executive producer.

TV Guide's Charles Cassady surmised that the film's premise was inspired by a series of articles published by the San Jose Mercury News, which accused the Reagan administration of allowing the importation of drugs into the U.S. to finance the Nicaraguan Contras during the 1980s. This however, appear to be incorrect, as the film was made before the publication of the first article, which is dated August 18, 1996.

== Release ==
The film's international sales were handled by Moonstone Entertainment. The original version of the film clocks in at slightly less than 93 minutes. The U.S. home video version was cut down to 82 minutes.

=== Home media ===
In Canada, the film premiered on VHS on April 9, 1996, courtesy of CFP Video. In the U.S., the film was initially announced by Roger Corman's New Horizons Home Video for August 20, 1996. A screener, packaged in a little seen dark sleeve, was sent to critics and retailers in the run-up to that date. However, the tape was delayed and only resurfaced on March 17, 1998, under the same SKU but boasting new art. The VHS' delay may be related to the decision to retrofit the film into an anthology of films made by Corman around the same time, and set to premiere on Showtime (see below). The film appeared in the U.K. on May 13, 1996, through Entertainment in Video.

On August 13, 2024, American distributor MVD Entertainment Group released When the Bullet Hits the Bone on Blu-ray disc as part of their "MVD Rewind Collection" of videostore era re-issues.

=== Television ===
Although there is no indication that he was involved in the actual making of it, the film was broadcast as part of the Roger Corman Presents anthology produced by Corman for American pay channel Showtime. The eleventh movie of the series' second and last season, it was broadcast on October 12, 1996. Unlike the trimmed version released by Corman on VHS, this one was the original cut. In Canada, the film had its first TV showing on pay channel The Movie Network on December 16, 1996.

== Reception ==
When the Bullet Hits the Bone was negatively received. Writing for the Knight Ridder family of publications, Randy Myers panned the film as "a really bad doctor flick", "sloppily made and boring", and negatively compared it to another Canadian-shot medical thriller released the same week in the U.S., The Surgeon. He gave it zero stars. The BBC's Radio Times deemed it "violent but unerringly predictable", adding that "scripting [was] lazy" and finding Wincott's character "implausible". Canadian media watchdog Médiafilm, historically close to the Catholic church, criticized the film's "gratuitous violence" and "unrefined direction". TV Guide lambasted the film, saying: "a simplistic script, an almost non-existent budget and laughable execution [...] make When the Bullet Hits the Bone a shambles of a straight-to-video action flick." While Ballantine Books' Video Movie Guide wrote that "Star Jeff Wincott has done so many of these lone-avenger films it’s almost hard to tell them one from the other", Videohound found it to be a "[p]articularly nasty vigilante flick".

A discordant voice came from syndicated columnist Joe Bob Briggs, a reviewer with an affinity for so-called "drive-in" films, who extolled the film's virtues in an article entitled Violence, sex, sleaze: action flick has it all. Briggs argued that "[u]nlike most Bronson-type movies, this one moves. It twists, it turns, and doesn't even sag in the middle", while commending the film for its high tally of "[t]wenty dead bodies. Two pistol whippings. Three gun battles".

== Soundtrack ==
As with the predecessor No Exit, the film's score was composed and produced by former Red Rider guitarist Ken Greer. The soundtrack also includes several songs. Among them are "Dying of Love" and "20th Century New Salvation", two songs by Hunter/Greer, the composer's then current project with former Refugee vocalist Myles Hunter. Another song, "No More Cruel World", is performed by Naro, the solo project of Talas singer Phil Naro, who sang the theme song composed by Hunter and Greer for No Exit. The ending song, which is not credited, is "Healing Waters" by Lawrence Gowan. It was later re-recorded when Gowan was commissioned by the BBC to contribute a song to a tribute show for Princess Diana.
