= Billy Drago =

American actor (1945–2019)

- Born: Billy Eugene Burrows; November 30, 1945; Hugoton, Kansas, U.S.
- Died: June 24, 2019 (aged 73); Los Angeles, California, U.S.
- Occupation: Actor
- Years active: 1979–2014
- Spouse: Silvana Gallardo (m. 1980; died 2012)
- Children: 2, including Darren E. Burrows

Billy Eugene Burrows (November 30, 1945 – June 24, 2019), known professionally by his stage name Billy Drago, was an American television and film actor. Drago's films, where he was frequently cast as a villain, included Clint Eastwood's western Pale Rider (1985) and Brian De Palma's The Untouchables (1987). He also had recurring roles in the television series The Adventures of Brisco County, Jr. and Charmed.

== Early life ==
Billy Eugene Burrows was born on November 30, 1945, in Hugoton, Kansas, the son of William Franklin Burrows Jr., and Gladys Marie Wilcox (1918–1990) on November 30, 1945. He has an older sister, Patricia. He said his maternal lineage was of Romani descent and that his paternal lineage was Native American. He later took his grandmother's maiden name "Drago" as his stage name to avoid being confused with another actor. Growing up, his parents would drop him off at the movie theater often in their rural town.

After leaving high school he started out as a journalist for the Associated Press, and later became a popular voice on the radio that took him first to Canada and then to New York City. After a brief stint with a touring theater group, he worked as a stuntman at Boot Hill in Dodge City, Kansas. From there he went on to the University of Kansas. After finishing college, he joined an acting company.

== Career ==
Drago began his acting career in 1979. His early films included No Other Love, Windwalker and the Jeff Bridges movie, Cutter's Way. He went on to guest star in numerous television series, including Hill Street Blues, Moonlighting, Walker, Texas Ranger and Trapper John, M.D..

The role that brought his career international prominence was as the gangster assassin Frank Nitti in Brian De Palma's 1987 blockbuster The Untouchables. Subsequently, Drago appeared in numerous films and television series including The X-Files and a recurring role as outlaw John Bly in The Adventures of Brisco County, Jr.

In 1999 he began playing the demon Barbas in the WB series Charmed. Barbas was originally written as a villain of the week (in the episode "From Fear to Eternity"), but proved so popular with fans that he ultimately appeared in five of the show's eight seasons.

Drago was also featured in Michael Jackson's 2001 music video "You Rock My World,” and played a mysterious stranger who gives a boy a special key in the Mike + The Mechanics music video for "Silent Running (On Dangerous Ground)". Other notable projects include Gregg Araki's 2004 film Mysterious Skin, Pale Rider, the 2006 version of The Hills Have Eyes, Low Down, and Takashi Miike's Masters of Horror episode "Imprint", which Showtime chose not to air in the United States due to its "disturbing content."

== Personal life ==
Drago was married to actress Silvana Gallardo from 1980 until her death in 2012. He has two sons, including Darren E. Burrows, an actor known for his role in the 1990s television series Northern Exposure.

== Death ==
Drago died from complications following a stroke in Los Angeles on June 24, 2019. He was 73.

== Filmography ==
| Year | Title | Role | Notes |
|---|---|---|---|
| 1979 | The Chisholms | Teetontah / Teetonkah | TV mini-series |
| 1979 | No Other Love | Brian | TV movie |
| 1980 | Windwalker | Crow Scout | |
| 1981 | Cutter's Way | Garbage Man | |
| 1982 | Johnny Belinda | Cutter | TV movie |
| 1984 | Hunter | Roscoe Ganther | Episode: Pen "Pals" |
| 1985 | Pale Rider | Deputy Mather | |
| 1985 | Invasion U.S.A. | Mickey | |
| 1985 | Moonlighting | Gangster In Leather Coat | Episode: "My Fair David" |
| 1986 | Hunter | LeClair | Episode: "War Zone" |
| 1986 | North and South, Book II | 'Rat' | TV mini-series |
| 1986 | Vamp | 'Snow' | |
| 1986 | Hunter's Blood | 'Snake' | |
| 1987 | In Self Defense | Edward Reeves | TV movie |
| 1987 | The Untouchables | Frank Nitti | |
| 1987 | Banzai Runner | Syszek | |
| 1988 | Hero and the Terror | Dr. Highwater | |
| 1988 | Freeway | Edward Anthony Heller | |
| 1988 | Dark Before Dawn | Cabalista Leader | |
| 1988 | Friday the 13th: the Series | Edgar Van Horne | Episode: "Read My Lips" |
| 1989 | True Blood | Billy 'Spider' Masters | monsters episode The Cocoon Detective |
| 1989 | China White | Scalia | |
| 1989 | Prime Suspect | Cyril | |
| 1990 | Delta Force 2: The Colombian Connection | Ramon Cota | |
| 1991 | Diplomatic Immunity | 'Cowboy' | |
| 1991 | Martial Law 2: Undercover | Captain Krantz | |
| 1992 | Secret Games | Mark Langford | |
| 1992 | Death Ring | Danton Vachs | |
| 1992 | Guncrazy | Hank Fulton | |
| 1993 | Lady Dragon 2 | Diego | |
| 1993 | The Outfit | 'Lucky' Luciano | |
| 1993 | Deadly Heroes | Jose Maria Carlos | |
| 1993 | Cyborg 2 | Danny Bench | |
| 1993–1994 | The Adventures of Brisco County, Jr. | John Bly | TV series, 6 episodes |
| 1994 | Never Say Die | Reverend James | |
| 1994 | The Takeover | Daniel Stein | |
| 1995 | Lunarcop | Kay | |
| 1995 | Phoenix | Kilgore | |
| 1995 | Mirror, Mirror III: The Voyeur | Anthony | |
| 1995 | Drifting School | Thomas King | |
| 1995 | Walker, Texas Ranger | Running Wolf | Episode: "Evil In The Night" |
| 1996 | Blood Money | Agent Pierce | |
| 1996 | Mad Dog Time | Wells | |
| 1996 | Sci-Fighters | Adrian Dunn | |
| 1996 | Blue Devil, Blue Devil | Macintower | |
| 1997 | Assault on Devil's Island | Carlos Gallindo | |
| 1997 | Convict 762 | Mannix | |
| 1997 | A Doll in the Dark | Keith | |
| 1998 | Monkey Business | Branson | |
| 1999 | Soccer Dog: The Movie | Damon Fleming, The Dog Catcher | |
| 1999 | Lima: Breaking the Silence | General Monticito Frantacino | |
| 1999 | Nash Bridges | Lou Grissom | Episode: "Vendetta" |
| 1999–2004 | Charmed | Barbas | TV series, 6 episodes |
| 2000 | The X-Files | Orel Peattie | Episode: "Theef" |
| 2000 | Very Mean Men | Dante | |
| 2000 | Mirror, Mirror IV: Reflection | Frederick Champion | |
| 2001 | Death Game | 'Shakes' Montrose | |
| 2002 | Desert Rose | Unknown | |
| 2002 | The Circuit | Lenny | |
| 2002 | Welcome to America | Crazy Old Man | |
| 2004 | Tremors 4: The Legend Begins | 'Black Hand' Kelly | |
| 2004 | Fort Doom | Mr. Fallow | |
| 2004 | Mysterious Skin | Zeke | |
| 2005 | Demon Hunter | Asmodeus | |
| 2005 | Blood Relic | Harry | |
| 2006 | Masters of Horror | Christopher | Episode: "Imprint" |
| 2006 | Seven Mummies | Drake | |
| 2006 | The Hills Have Eyes | Papa Jupiter | |
| 2006 | Soul Searchers | Unknown | |
| 2006 | Lime Salted Love | Zephyr's Stepdad | |
| 2007 | El Muerto | The Old Indian | |
| 2007 | Moving McAllister | The Lady | |
| 2007 | Revamped | Vladimus | |
| 2007 | Zombie Hunters | Dr. Frankfurt | |
| 2008 | Supernatural | 'Doc' Benton | Episode: "Time Is on My Side" |
| 2008 | Copperhead | Jesse Evans | TV movie |
| 2008 | Rounds | Edward | |
| 2009 | Dark Moon Rising | Thibodeaux | |
| 2009 | Ghost Town | Reb Halland | TV movie |
| 2009 | The Ritual | The Man In Black | |
| 2010 | Downstream | Edward | |
| 2011 | Children of the Corn: Genesis | Preacher | |
| 2011 | Balls to the Wall | Belthagor | |
| 2013 | Night of the Templar | Shauna, The Chef | |
| 2014 | Low Down | Lew | |
| 2014 | The Dance | The Stranger | Final film role |
