= Fast Track (American TV series) =

- Genre: Action
- Created by: Gary Markowitz
- Starring: Keith Carradine; Duncan Regehr; Brandy Ledford; Guylaine St. Onge; Tristan Rogers; Fred Williamson
- Countries of origin: United States; Canada
- Original language: English
- No. of seasons: 1
- No. of episodes: 22

Production
- Executive producers: Larry Gelbart; Gary Markowitz
- Producer: Sean Ryerson
- Production company: Alliance Entertainment

Original release
- Network: Showtime; The Movie Network
- Release: August 3, 1997 – March 12, 1998

Fast Track is an action drama television series created by Gary Markowitz, and executive produced by Larry Gelbart and Markowitz, which starred Keith Carradine. It aired on Showtime between August 1997 and March 1998, and was cancelled after one season.

== Plot ==
Set in the world of NASCAR stock car racing, the show follows orthopedic surgeon and former racing driver Richard Beckett (Keith Carradine) who is hired to be the track doctor of Eagle Ridge Speedway by its owner, Christian Chandler Jr. (Duncan Regehr). Chandler's unhappy wife Nicole (Guylaine St. Onge) is Beckett's former lover, while Chandler's younger sister Mimi (Brandy Ledford), a lawyer, would like to be Beckett's current lover.

== Cast ==
- Keith Carradine as Dr. Richard Beckett
- Duncan Regehr as Christian Chandler Jr.
- Brandy Ledford as Mimi Chandler
- Guylaine St. Onge as Nicole Chandler
- Tristan Rogers as Harry
- Randy J. Goodwin as Kennedy Winslow
- Jenny Cooper as Wendy Servine
- Michael Copeman as Darrel Butts
- Marc Daniel as Nando
- Sebastian Spence as Stevie Servine
- Fred Williamson as Lowell Carter
- Paul Condon as uncredited extra

== Episodes ==
No.	Title	Directed by	Original release date
1	"Beckett's Return" "Pilot"	T.J. Scott	August 3, 1997
Note: Originally aired with episode 2 as a 90-minute movie.
2	"Sweet Thunder"	T.J. Scott(?)	August 3, 1997
Note: Originally aired with episode 1 as a 90-minute movie.
3	"The Race Fan"	Michael Robison	August 16, 1997
4	"Laps of Faith"	F. Harvey Frost	August 23, 1997
5	"Fathers & Sons"	Michael Robison	August 30, 1997
6	"Fast Money"	F. Harvey Frost	September 6, 1997
7	"The Whole Truth"	Ken Girotti	October 25, 1997
8	"Combustions"	Stefan Scaini	November 1, 1997
9	"Kennedy Gets a Ride"	Rene Bonniere	November 8, 1997
10	"Triangle"	Stefan Scaini	November 15, 1997
11	"Winners & Sinners"	Fred Williamson	November 22, 1997
12	"Sibling Rivalry"	Stacey Stewart Cortis	November 29, 1997
13	"Fighting Words"	J. J. Scott	January 14, 1998
14	"Real Time"	Roman Buchok	January 21, 1998
15	"Kat's Cradle"	Peter Rowe	January 28, 1998
16	"Going Japanese"	Clark Johnson	February 4, 1998
17	"The Good Old Days"	Brenton Spencer	February 11, 1998
18	"Jeff's Back"	Clark Johnson	February 18, 1998
19	"The Temptation of Beckett"	Fred Williamson	February 19, 1998
20	"Guys with Guns"	F. Harvey Frost	February 26, 1998
21	"Deconstructing Eagle Ridge"	David Straiton	March 5, 1998
22	"Change of Heart"	Roman Buchok	March 12, 1998

== Production ==
The series was filmed in Toronto, Canada, and many of the show's actors, and all of the show's episode directors, were Canadian.

== Reception ==
Caryn James of The New York Times was unimpressed with the series, stating "There's not much Mr. Carradine can do with such silliness except ratchet his acting up a few notches."
