= Martial Law 2: Undercover =

- Promotional release poster
- Directed by: Kurt Anderson
- Written by: Richard Brandes
- Produced by: Steven Cohen
- Starring: Jeff Wincott; Cynthia Rothrock; Paul Johansson
- Cinematography: Peter Fernberger
- Edited by: Michael Thibault
- Music by: Elliot Solomon
- Release date: January 1992 (Philippines)
- Running time: 92 minutes
- Country: United States

Martial Law 2: Undercover (also known as Karate Cop) is a 1991 martial arts film written by Richard Brandes and Jiles Fitzgerald, produced by Steve Cohen, directed by Kurt Anderson and stars Jeff Wincott, Cynthia Rothrock, Paul Johansson, L. Charles Taylor, Sherrie Rose, and Billy Drago. It is also the sequel to the 1990 film Martial Law. It is the second installment in the Martial Law film series.

== Plot ==
Investigating the mysterious death of a colleague, LAPD cops Sean Thompson, who is now a detective (and played by Jeff Wincott), and Billie Blake begin to uncover a deadly ring of murder and corruption. Their search leads to a nightclub, where the rich and powerful are entertained by a stable of beautiful girls and protected by martial arts experts hired by a ruthless crime lord. When Thompson is called off the investigation by his commander, Billie goes undercover and infiltrates the ring on her own; soon, both are facing impossible odds in a climactic battle.

== Cast ==
- Jeff Wincott as Detective Sean Thompson
- Cynthia Rothrock as Billie Blake
- Paul Johansson as Spencer Hamilton
- Evan Lurie as Tanner
- Charles Taylor as Dobbs (credited as L. Charles Taylor)
- Sherrie Rose as Bree
- Billy Drago as Captain Krantz
- Deborah Drigg as Tiffany
- Conroy Gedeon as Jones
- Kimber Sisson as Celeste
- Leo Lee as Han
- Max Thayer as Captain Banks
- John Vidor as Sonny
- Nicholas Hill as Jorge
- Dagny Hultgreen as Kristine Richards
- Ken Duncan as Brad Hamilton
- Lou Palumbo as Al Murphy
- Pat Asanti as George
- Oscar Dillon as Jones Bodyguard #1
- Rico McClinton as Jones Bodyguard #2
- Addison Cook as Bob (credited as Addison Cook Porter IV)
- Bridget Carney as Flash Dancer
- Michael Anthony Taylor Talking Cop (credited as Michael-Anthony Taylor)
- Gregg Brazzel as Bo
- Jeffrey Scott Jensen as Plainclothes #1
- Christopher Ursitti as Cop #1
- Denice Duff as Nancy Borelli (credited as Denice Marie Duff)
- Lumpy Strathmore as Officer Dickens
- Matthew Powers Rick
- Lou Voiler as Dude
- Fritz Lieber as Lenny

== Release ==
=== Home media ===
The film made its world debut at the American Film Market in October 1991, but would eventually be released in the United States only on home video. In the Philippines, where Rothrock was already an A-list star, the film opened in early January 1992, exhibited in Manila theaters as a "super roadshow presentation". The film would be released on videocassette in August 1992 by MCA/Universal Home Video. The film was released on DVD in Europe, by Bellevue Entertainment. It is part of a movie package that also contains Savate, Martial Law and Mission of Justice. The film has been released on Blu-ray in the United States by Vinegar Syndrome.

== Sequel ==
On December 2, 1992, a next entry titled Mission of Justice (aka Martial Law III) was released, it is a standalone sequel.

The plot centers on Kurt Harris, a bitter, former policeman, who infiltrates a neo-fascist group after his friend is killed by their leader. While there, he discovers that the leader wants to run for mayor and will do anything to achieve her goal.
