= Jeff Wincott =

Canadian actor (born 1956)

Jeffrey Wincott
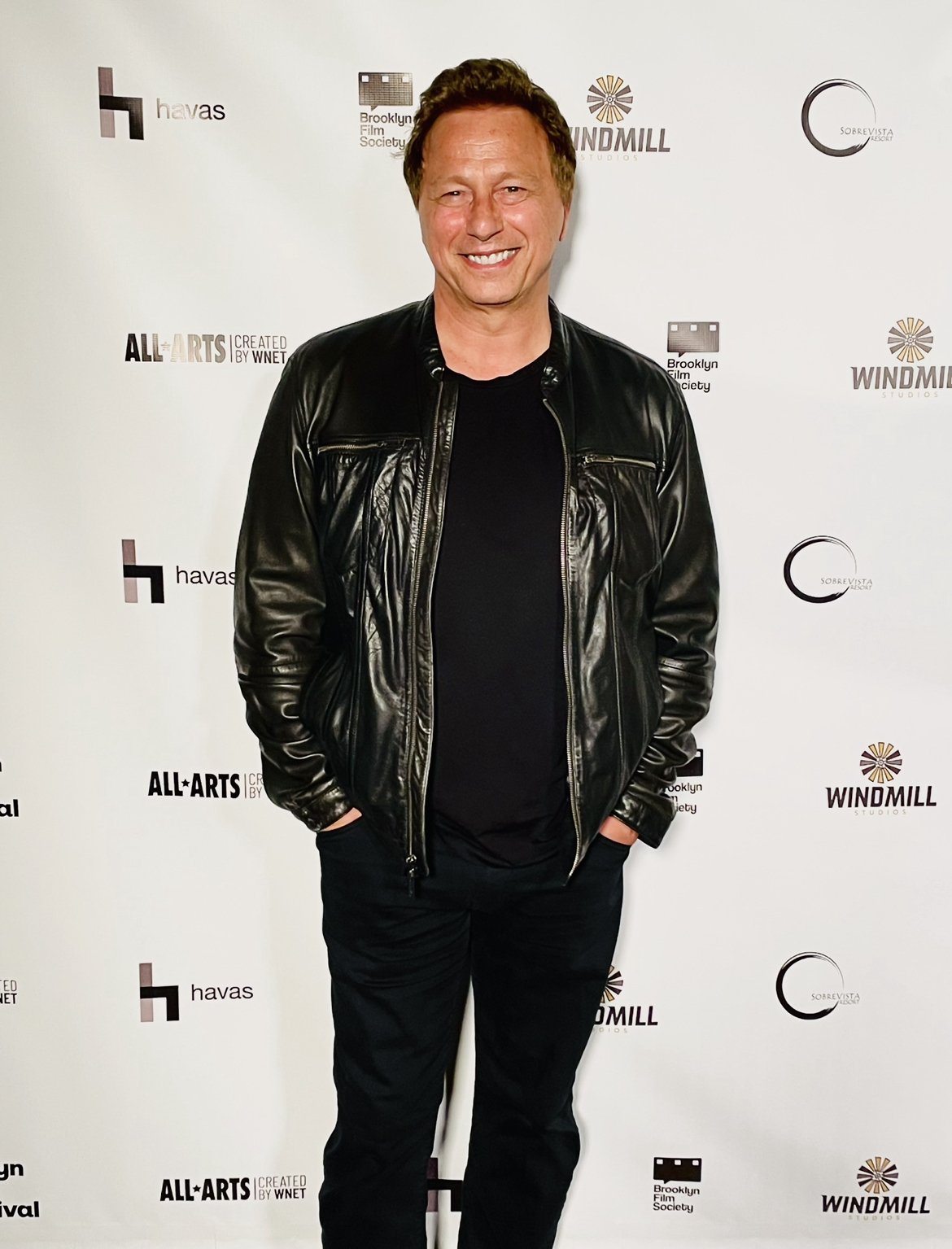
- Wincott at the 2021 Brooklyn Film Festival
- Born: Jeffrey Howard Piero Wincott; May 8, 1956 (age 70); Toronto, Ontario, Canada
- Education: Ryerson University Theatre School
- Occupations: Actor; Martial artist
- Years active: 1976–present
- Family: Michael Wincott (brother)
- Website: www.jeffwincott.com

Jeffrey Wincott (born May 8, 1956) is a Canadian actor and martial artist best known for his lead role in the television series Night Heat.

Wincott was also the star of several martial arts films in the 1990s. In 1996 he was named one of the "Martial Arts Movie Stars of the Next Century" by Black Belt magazine.

== Early life and education ==
Wincott was born and raised in Toronto. His mother was from Piacenza, Italy. His English father was an amateur boxer. Actor Michael Wincott is his younger brother.

Wincott began studying taekwondo at 15 and also swam competitively. Wincott became interested in acting while in high school and wound up turning down a swimming scholarship to study acting at Ryerson Polytechnical Institute, where he studied for 2 years.

== Career ==
One of Wincott's first acting jobs was in 1979 when he appeared on two episodes of the Canadian sitcom King of Kensington. He also appeared in an episode of the Canadian series The Littlest Hobo. that same year.

In 1980, he toured with the Toronto-based Actors Touring Company in their production of Romeo and Juliet, followed by the Runnymede Theatre production Play it Again, Sam in which Wincott played the role of Humphrey Bogart. That same year he also had a small role in the horror movie Prom Night, and the following year he had a small role in the film Quest for Fire.

Wincott appeared in an episode of the Canadian drama series The Great Detective in 1982. In 1981 and 1983, he appeared again in episodes of The Littlest Hobo. He also appeared in episodes of the Canadian TV series Hangin' In in 1983 and 1984.

From 1981 to 1983, Wincott lived in New York City, where he studied privately with Juilliard teacher Michael Kahn, before moving on to Los Angeles to film a beer commercial for Molson. While in L.A. he taught breakdancing and would also perform mime on Venice Beach for money.

In 1984, Wincott returned to Toronto and began working on the Canadian police drama series Night Heat. The series starred Scott Hylands as Detective Kevin O'Brien and Wincott as his partner, the brash and impulsive Detective Frank Giambone. The series ran for four seasons from 1985 to 1989 and also aired on CBS, making it the first Canadian-produced drama series to air on an American network. In 1986, he also appeared in the Canadian drama film The Boy in Blue starring Nicolas Cage.

In the 1990s, Wincott was the star of several action films, often making use of his martial arts skills. Some of these films include Martial Law 2: Undercover (1991), Mission of Justice opposite Brigitte Nielsen (1992), Deadly Bet (1992), Martial Outlaw (1993), The Killing Machine (1994), Street Law (1995), Last Man Standing (1995), The Donor (1995), No Exit (1995), When the Bullet Hits the Bone (1996), and Future Fear (1997).

In 2003, Wincott appeared in two episodes of the second season of TV series 24. He played the recurring role of James 'Jimmy' Cacuzza on the crime drama series Sons of Anarchy, appearing in episodes that aired in 2008, 2012 and 2013. In 2012, Wincott played Captain Mancuso in an episode in the third season of the TV series Blue Bloods, and reprised the role in the series fifth season. He also played recurring character Marshal Hilliard in the miniseries The Lizzie Borden Chronicles (2015) and Detective Lucas in the miniseries The Night Of (2016).

He was featured in the action films The Invasion (2007) and Unstoppable (2010) and played a supporting role in the independent film Kringle Time.

In 2019, Jeff and his wife Charlotte founded Hollow Metropolis Films in order to create and produce their own work. In 2020, the Wincotts co-produced their first feature film, The Issue with Elvis. Directed by Charlotte, the film stars Jeff, as well as their son Wolfgang. Wincott won the Best Actor award for his role in the film at the Toronto Beaches Film Festival, and the Montgomery International Film Festival. The Wincotts also co-produced Fall Fight Shine, a documentary about addiction and recovery featuring Jeff's own recovery story. The film premiered in 2021.

== Filmography ==
=== Film ===
Year	Title	Role	Notes
1980	Happy Birthday Gemini	Taxi Driver	
1980	Prom Night	Drew	
1986	The Boy in Blue	Riley	
1991	Martial Law 2: Undercover	Detective Sean Thompson	
1992	Deadly Bet	Angelo	
1992	Mission of Justice	Officer Kurt Harris	
1993	Martial Outlaw	Kevin White	
1994	Open Fire	Alec McNeil	Also associate producer
1994	The Killing Machine	Harlin Garrett	Released in the U.S. as The Killing Man; Also associate producer
1995	No Exit	John Stoneman	Also associate producer
1995	Law of the Jungle	John Ryan	Released in the U.S. as Street Law; Also associate producer and fight choreographer
1995	The Donor	Billy Castle	Also associate producer
1995	Last Man Standing	Detective Kurt Bellmore	Also, co-producer
1996	When the Bullet Hits the Bone	Dr. Jack Davies	Also associate producer
1996	Profile for Murder	Michael Weinberg	
1997	The Undertaker's Wedding	Rocco	
2000	Paper Bullets	Dickerson	
2001	Pressure Point	Rudy Wicker	
2003	S.W.A.T.	Ed Taylor	
2007	The Invasion	Transit Cop	
2008	Lake City	Leo	
2010	Unstoppable	Jesse	
2019	# Like	Detective Horne	
2021	Kringle Time	Mayor Rodney Jorkins	
2022	The Issue with Elvis	Dr. Mercer	Also, Producer
2022	Fall Fight Shine (documentary)	Himself	Also, Producer
2026	A Philistine in Queens	Charlie Biggs	Also, Producer
2026	Piece of the Wall	Ray	Also, Producer
2026	FAST	Entrepreneur	

=== Short film ===
Year	Title	Role	Notes
2007	Lustig	German Sergeant	
2016	Behind Bars	Kidd	
2019	Ping Pong Pigeons	Zachary Lewis	
2019	Platitudes	Mr. Bennett	
2020	Dystopian Snow Globe	Pierce Pearson	

=== Television ===
Year	Title	Role	Notes
1984–1989	Night Heat	Detective Frank Giambone	Main role. 96 episodes
1989	Matlock	Spencer Hamilton	Episodes: "Hunting Party" Parts 1 & 2
1998	Universal Soldier II: Brothers in Arms	Eric Devereaux	Television film
1998	Universal Soldier III: Unfinished Business	Eric Devereaux	Television film
2003	JAG	Captain Masters	Episode: "Complications"
2003	24	Davis	2 episodes
2005	NCIS	Gunnery Sergeant Leeka	Episode: "Red Cell"
2008	The Wire	Johnny Weaver	Episode "-30-"
2011	Person of Interest	Lieutenant Allan Gilmore	Episode: "The Fix"
2012–2015	Blue Bloods	ESU/Captain Mancuso	Episodes: "Family Business" "Occupational Hazards"
2012	The Good Wife	Tim Resnick	Episode: "Battle of The Proxies"
2008–2013	Sons of Anarchy	Jimmy Cacuzza	3 episodes
2014	The Lizzie Borden Chronicles	Marshal Hilliard	5 episodes
2016	The Night Of	Detective Lucas	4 episodes
2019	The Code	General Carrick	CBS original pilot

=== Theatre work ===
Year	Title	Role
1977	Anne of a Thousand Days	Mark Smeaton
1978	Romeo and Juliet	Tybalt
1979	Play It Again, Sam	Bogie
1980	Bent	Wolf/Kapo

== Awards and nominations ==
Year	Nominated Work	Category	Name of Award	Result
1986	Night Heat	Outstanding Actor in a Drama Series	Gemini Awards	Nominated
2016	Behind Bars	Festival Director's Award	Toronto Independent Film Festival	Won
2018	Behind Bars	Best Short Jury Award	Toronto Independent Film Festival	Won
2021	Kringle Time	Best Supporting Actor	GenreBlast Film Festival	Nominated
2021	The Issue with Elvis	Best Producer	Washington Film Festival	Won
2021	The Issue with Elvis	Best Feature Film	Toronto Beaches Film Festival	Won
2021	The Issue with Elvis	Best Actor	Toronto Beaches Film Festival	Won
2021	The Issue with Elvis	Best Actor	Montgomery International Film Festival	Won
2021	The Issue with Elvis	Best Actor	Hollywood Women's Film Festival	Won
2021	The Issue with Elvis	Best Feature Film	Hollywood Women's Film Festival	Won
2021	The Issue with Elvis	Best Original Film	Poe Film Festival	Won
2021	The Issue with Elvis	Audience Selection Best of Fest	Poe Film Festival	Won
2021	Fall Fight Shine	Best Documentary Feature Film	Hollywood Women's Film Festival	Won
2022	Fall Fight Shine	Best Documentary Feature	Toronto Independent Film Festival	Won
2023	Fall Fight Shine	Best Documentary Audience Award	Golden State Film Festival	Won
2025	Piece Of The Wall	Audience Award Best Feature Film	Toronto Independent Film Festival	Won

== See also ==
- List of University of Waterloo people
