= Michelle Johnson (actress) =

American actress

- Born: Anchorage, Alaska, U.S.
- Other name: Michelle Williams
- Education: Alhambra High School
- Occupation: Actress
- Years active: 1984–2018
- Spouse: Matt Williams (m. 1999; div. 2002)

Michelle Johnson is an American actress who portrayed Jennifer Lyons in the 1984 romantic comedy film Blame It on Rio, Jessica Cole in The Glimmer Man (1996), and Kim Carlisle in The Love Boat (1984–1985).

== Early life and education ==
Johnson was born in Anchorage, Alaska. At age four, Johnson and her mother moved to Phoenix, Arizona, where her mother married child psychologist Dr. Grant Johnson. Johnson attended Alhambra High School from 1981 through 1984, graduating one semester early in January 1984.

== Career ==
Johnson won the International Model of the Year competition in 1982. At age 16, Johnson began doing fashion print work and was soon signed by the Wilhelmina agency in New York City. Director Stanley Donen spotted her in a photograph in the fashion biweekly W, and just as her modeling career was beginning, chose her to act in his feature film Blame It on Rio.

Johnson appeared in a number of roles over the next 15 years. Michelle Johnson played Linda Kolkena Broderick, the second wife of Dan Broderick, in the TV movie A Woman Scorned: The Betty Broderick Story (1992) and its sequel, Her Final Fury: Betty Broderick, the Last Chapter. She appeared in theatrical films, television movies, and television series, including a recurring role as Kim Carlisle on season eight of The Love Boat. She appeared in films Gung Ho (1986), Waxwork (1988), Dr. Giggles (1992), and The Glimmer Man (1996). She also co-starred in TV movie Dallas: War of the Ewings in 1998 as Jennifer Jantzen, and in 1985 played Rhonda Cummings in an episode of Dallas.

Her most recent major film role was in Mickey (2004). She remained out of the public eye until returning to acting briefly in the digital media Christmas special Brat Holiday Spectacular (2018).

== Personal life ==
Johnson married Major League Baseball player Matt Williams of the Arizona Diamondbacks on January 15, 1999. She sought a divorce in July 2002. The couple had resided primarily in Scottsdale, Arizona.

== Filmography ==
Year	Title	Role	Notes
1984	Blame It on Rio	Jennifer Lyons	
1986	Gung Ho	Heather DiStefano	
1987	Beaks: The Movie	Vanessa Cartwright	
1988	The Jigsaw Murders	Kathy DaVonzo	
1988	Slipping Into Darkness	Carlyle	
1988	Waxwork	China Webster	
1990	Wishful Thinking	Diane	
1990	Trabbi Goes to Hollywood	Ricki	
1990	Genuine Risk	Girl	
1992	Death Becomes Her	Anna	
1992	Dr. Giggles	Tamara	
1992	Far and Away	Grace	
1992	Street Wars	Tina	
1993	Body Shot	Danielle Wild/Chelsea Savage	
1995	Illicit Dreams	Melinda Ryan	
1995	The Donor	Dr. Lucy Flynn	
1995	When the Bullet Hits the Bone	Lisa	
1996	The Glimmer Man	Jessica Cole	
1996	Specimen	Sarah	
1997	Inner Action		
1997	Moving Target	Casey	
1999	Revenge	Vicky Mayerson	
2004	Mickey	Patty	
2018	Brat Holiday Spectacular	Nellie (Eleanor Chambers)	

=== Television ===
Year	Title	Role	Notes
1984	Hotel	Kelly Branden	Episode: "Flesh and Blood"
1985	Dallas	Rhonda Cummings	Episode: "The Verdict"
1985	Half Nelson	Linda Sawyer	Episode: "The Deadly Vase"
1984-1985	The Love Boat	Kim Carlisle	7 episodes
1987	Werewolf	Kelly Nichols	Episode: "Pilot"
1987	Charles in Charge	Joyce	Episode: "Her Brother's Keeper"
1989	Moonlighting	Michelle Hunziger	Episode: "Plastic Fantastic Lovers"
1989	Moonlighting	Michelle Hunziger (uncredited)	Episode: "Shirts and Skins"
1991	Blood Ties	Celia	TV movie
1991	Tales from the Crypt	Liz Kelly-Dixon	Episode: "Split Second"
1992	A Woman Scorned: The Betty Broderick Story	Linda Kolkena Broderick	TV movie
1992	Murder, She Wrote	Monica Chase	Episode: "Incident in Lot 7"
1992	Melrose Place	Perry Morgan	Episode: "For Love or Money"
1992	Her Final Fury: Betty Broderick, the Last Chapter	Linda Broderick	TV movie
1993	Melrose Place	Perry Morgan	Episode: "The Test"
1993	Murder, She Wrote	Janet Fisk	Episode: "Ship of Thieves"
1993	Herman's Head	Aurora	Episode: "Trouble in Paradise"
1994	Menendez: A Killing in Beverly Hills	Lisa	TV movie
1994	Incident at Deception Ridge	Natalie Harris	TV movie
1996	The Outer Limits	Ady Sutton	Episode: "First Anniversary"
1998	Dallas: War of the Ewings	Jennifer Jantzen	TV movie
