= Body Chemistry (1990 film) =

- Directed by: Kristine Peterson
- Screenplay by: Jackson Barr
- Produced by: Alida Camp; Roger Corman; Rodman Flender
- Starring: Marc Singer; Mary Crosby; Lisa Pescia; David Kagen; Joseph Campanella
- Cinematography: Phedon Papamichael
- Edited by: Nina M. Gilberti
- Music by: Terry Plumeri
- Production company: Concorde Productions
- Distributed by: RCA/Columbia Pictures Home Video (1990)
- Release date: March 9, 1990
- Running time: 84 minutes
- Country: United States
- Language: English
- Box office: $2.4m

Body Chemistry is a 1990 erotic thriller film written by Jackson Barr and directed by Kristine Peterson. It is the first film in the Body Chemistry franchise which follows the character of psychotic psychiatrist Dr. Claire Archer, played by Lisa Pescia in her feature film lead debut.

== Plot ==
At the Neurology Institute, Dr. Tom Redding (Marc Singer) and Dr. Freddie Summers (David Kagen) study brain responses to sexual and non-sexual stimuli, where Tom meets the alluring Dr. Claire Archer (Lisa Pescia), an expert in the biology of aggression whose research proposal impresses their boss, Dr. Pritchard (Joseph Campanella).

While Tom is married to Marlee (Mary Crosby), Claire seduces him during a late-night lab session, and their affair escalates rapidly. Tom attempts to hide the relationship, but Claire becomes increasingly possessive, manipulative, and entangled in both his professional life and his home, forcing him into deeper lies as she pressures him to continue the affair.

When Tom tries to break things off, Claire retaliates with escalating psychological warfare. She sends disturbing packages to his home, records their encounters, and threatens his career and family. Her fixation grows dangerous: she appears unexpectedly, coerces him into further sexual encounters, and begins invading his family's space - including sending a sex tape disguised as a children's video to Tom's young son. Tom becomes desperate, lashing out violently at her, which only deepens Claire's conviction that their shared “chemistry” is inescapable.

As Tom and Marlee's marriage deteriorates, Claire boldly inserts herself into their social circle, culminating in her arrival at a celebratory dinner party as Freddie's date. Marlee overhears Tom threatening Claire, realizes he has been lying for months, and orders him out.

That night, Claire returns to the house, sets a fire, and sends the family into chaos. Tom confronts her, but the encounter ends with Claire shooting him and later claiming he was a dangerous, obsessive lover who refused to end the affair. When the police leave, Claire collapses in private grief.

== Cast ==
- Marc Singer as Tom Redding
- Lisa Pescia as Dr. Claire Archer
- Mary Crosby as Marlee Redding
- David Kagen as Freddie Summers
- H. Bradley Barneson as Jason Redding
- Joseph Campanella as Dr. Pritchard

== Production ==
The film was designed to capitalize on the tremendous box office success of Fatal Attraction with the character of Dr. Claire Archer was directly inspired by Alex Forrest, played by Glenn Close.

Principal photography began in Los Angeles on November 15, 1989. The film's alternate title was "Afterimage".

Mary Crosby (who was a classmate of Lisa Pescia at the Terrace Theatre Group) was initially cast as Dr. Claire Archer. Crosby's husband, Ed Lottimer (a friend of Roger Corman) introduced Pescia to Corman and she subsequently got the role after many rounds of auditions. Due to the success of the film on cable, Pescia attracted multiple acting opportunities.

During pre-production, director Kristine Peterson revised Barr's script with Thom Babbes, who had written Peterson's previous film, Deadly Dreams and together they added the BDSM elements and pushed the sex scenes to be more erotic than the ones in Fatal Attraction.

== Release ==
The film had its United States theatrical release on Friday, March 9, 1990, on a total of 53 screens. It grossed $38,025 on its opening weekend, placing 19th at the box office. Body Chemistry went on to gross $2,415,312 domestically.

=== Home media ===
The film was released on home video in the United States by RCA/Columbia Pictures Home Video and by 20:20 Vision in the UK.

The film was later released on DVD in the United States on May 21, 2001, by Concorde Home Video, It was later released as a double feature with the first sequel, as The Body Chemistry Collection on DVD in 2003.

A rare, 35mm print of the film was screened the New Beverly Cinema in Los Angeles on February 17, 2025.

== Reception ==
Kevin Thomas of the Los Angeles Times gave Body Chemistry a rave review upon release, saying Body Chemistry "is both stylish and darkly surprising." He went on to say the film was an improvement on Fatal Attraction "Every blockbuster movie can be expected to yield carbon copies, but Concorde’s modestly budgeted Body Chemistry is something different: it emulates Fatal Attraction only to improve upon it in several ways."

Ty Burr of Entertainment Weekly also felt the film was an improvement over Fatal Attraction, "The great thing about obscure B movies is that you never know when they’re going to be better than the A films they’re ripping off. Body Chemistry is an almost scene-for-scene imitation of Fatal Attraction, but it’s darker, deeper, and scarier-superior in everything except budget and flash." He went on to praise director Peterson, "Kristine Peterson’s direction is stylish yet firm: She wants to make this movie as creepily thought-provoking as possible, and she succeeds."

TV Guide was less complimentary, criticizing the film as "a tawdry, pointless exercise in sleaze redeemed only by above-average work from director Kristine Peterson and her technical crew."

== Sequels ==
The film was followed by three sequels following the character of Claire Archer, Body Chemistry II: The Voice of a Stranger, Point of Seduction: Body Chemistry III, and Body Chemistry IV: Full Exposure, but Lisa Pescia only returned for The Voice of a Stranger. The role was recast with Shari Shattuck in Point of Seduction and Shannon Tweed in Full Exposure.
