= Body Chemistry (film series) =

American erotic thriller film series

Body Chemistry is a series of four films that focus on psychotic psychiatrist Dr. Claire Archer. The character was inspired by the one played by Glenn Close in Fatal Attraction.

== Films ==
=== Body Chemistry (1990) ===
Body Chemistry is a 1990 erotic thriller film regarding a psychotic psychiatrist's obsession with her co-worker. It was directed and co-edited by Kristine Peterson and stars Marc Singer, Lisa Pescia, Mary Crosby, David Kagen, H. Bradley Barneson and Joseph Campanella. Executive produced by Roger Corman, Body Chemistry was inspired by the 1987 film Fatal Attraction, which had been a major success for distributor Paramount three years earlier.

The film follows Tom Redding as he studies human sexuality while trying to find a suitable balance between work and family life. However, when a new psychiatrist, Dr. Claire Archer, is brought onto his project, they begin to have a passionate affair, unlocking hidden dires deep within Tom that he never knew existed. However, when Archer pushes things too far, Tom tries to break off the affair, with devastating consequences.

=== Body Chemistry II: The Voice of a Stranger (1991) ===
Body Chemistry II: The Voice of a Stranger is a 1991 erotic thriller film and the sequel to the previous year's film Body Chemistry. The film follows Dr. Claire Archer as she becomes a radio psychiatrist in a small California desert town and becomes fixated on an ex-cop with a violent streak desperate for help. Lisa Pescia returns supported by a new cast including Gregory Harrison, Morton Downey Jr., Robin Riker, Clint Howard and John Landis.

=== Point of Seduction: Body Chemistry III (1994) ===
Point of Seduction: Body Chemistry III is a 1994 erotic thriller film following the character of psychiatrist Dr. Claire Archer. It is directed by Jim Wynorski and produced by and stars Andrew Stevens, making his second film for Roger Corman after 1991's The Terror Within II. Lisa Pescia is replaced in the central role by Shari Shattuck. Chick Vennera plays Freddie Summers, a character played by David Kagen in Body Chemistry with a supporting cast including cult actors Morgan Fairchild, Robert Forster, Stella Stevens and Delia Sheppard.

=== Body Chemistry IV: Full Exposure (1995) ===
Body Chemistry IV: Full Exposure is a 1995 erotic thriller film and the final sequel in the Body Chemistry film series. It was directed by returning helmer Jim Wynorski and follows on directly from Point of Seduction: Body Chemistry III, but with Dr. Claire Archer now played by erotic thriller queen Shannon Tweed. The film follows Dr. Claire Archer on trial for murder as she attempts to seduce and silence everyone who opposes her, including her own counsel. Stella Stevens is the only cast member to return from the previous film, although Andrew Stevens and Chick Vennera appear in archive footage from Body Chemistry III's final scene.

== Cast and crew ==
=== Cast ===
Character
Character	Body Chemistry	Body Chemistry II: The Voice of a Stranger	Point of Seduction: Body Chemistry III	Body Chemistry IV: Full Exposure
Character	1990	1991	1994	1995
Dr. Claire Archer	Lisa Pescia	Lisa Pescia	Shari Shattuck	Shannon Tweed
Tom Redding	Marc Singer			
Marlee Redding	Mary Crosby			
Freddie Summers	David Kagen		Chick Vennera	Chick Vennera^{A}
Jason Redding	H. Bradley Barneson			
Dr. Pritchard	Joseph Campanella			
Dan Peterson		Gregory Harrison		
Chuck "Big Chuck"		Morton Downey Jr.	Morton Downey Jr.^{P}	
Brenda Foster		Robin Riker		
John Larabee		Clint Howard		
Dr. Edwards		John Landis		
Alan Clay			Andrew Stevens	Andrew Stevens^{A}
Beth Chaney			Morgan Fairchild	
Bob Sibley			Robert Forster	Fred Grossinger
Frannie Sibley			Stella Stevens	Stella Stevens
Wilhemina			Delia Sheppard	
Simon Michell				Larry Poindexter
Judge Hakawa				Michael Paul Chan
Derrick Richmond				Larry Manetti
Lane Goodwin				Marta Martin
Charlotte Sanders				Elaine Giftos

=== Crew ===
Crew	Film			
Crew	Body Chemistry	Body Chemistry II: The Voice of a Stranger	Point of Seduction: Body Chemistry III	Body Chemistry IV: Full Exposure
Crew	1990	1991	1994	1995
Director	Kristine Peterson	Adam Simon	Jim Wynorski	Jim Wynorski
Producer(s)	Alida Camp; Roger Corman; Rodman Flender	Alida Camp; John Marshall; Roger Corman	Andrew Stevens; Roger Corman; Mike Elliott	Andrew Stevens
Screenwriter(s)	Jackson Barr	Jackson Barr; Christopher Wooden	Jackson Barr; Karen Kelly (uncredited)	Karen Kelly
Composer	Terry Plumeri	Nigel Holton	Chuck Cirino	Paul Di Franco
Cinematographer	Phedon Papamichael	Richard Michalak	Don E. FauntLeRoy	Zoran Hochstätter
Editor	Nina M. Gilberti	Richard Gentner	Terry J. Chiappe	Vanick Moradian
Production company	Concorde Productions	Concorde Productions	Concorde-New Horizons	Sunset Films International
