= Body Chemistry II: The Voice of a Stranger =

- Directed by: Adam Simon
- Screenplay by: Jackson Barr; Christopher Wooden
- Produced by: Alida Camp; John Marshall; Roger Corman
- Starring: Gregory Harrison; Lisa Pescia; Morton Downey Jr.; Robin Riker; Clint Howard
- Cinematography: Richard Michalak
- Edited by: Richard Gentner
- Music by: Nigel Holton
- Production company: Concorde Productions
- Distributed by: RCA/Columbia Pictures Home Video
- Release date: December 13, 1991
- Running time: 84 minutes
- Language: English

Body Chemistry II: The Voice of a Stranger is a 1991 erotic thriller sequel directed by Adam Simon and written by Jackson Barr and Christopher Wooden. It is the second film in the Body Chemistry franchise, following the character of psychotic psychiatrist Dr. Claire Archer, here played again by Lisa Pescia.

== Plot ==
After a particularly ugly exchange on the radio with a caller, radio psychiatrist Dr. Edwards (John Landis), is fired by station owner Big Chuck (Morton Downey Jr.) and replaced by Dr. Claire Archer (Lisa Pescia). At the same time, former Los Angeles cop, Dan Pearson (Gregory Harrison) moves back home after being kicked off the force and reunited with his former high school sweetheart, Brenda (Robin Riker). But what Brenda doesn't know is that Dan is hiding a secret; he was abused as a child and the trauma has left him with a violent temper and an insatiable appetite for rough sex. Wanting to change and settle down with Brenda, Dan calls into Dr. Archer's radio programme for advice, intrigued by the voice of the stranger calling in, Dr. Archer offers to treat Dan in person. But they soon begin an affair and their dangerous sex spirals sadistically out of control.

== Cast ==
- Gregory Harrison as Dan Pearson
- Lisa Pescia as Dr. Claire Archer
- Robin Riker as Brenda Foster
- Morton Downey Jr. as Chuck "Big Chuck"
- Clint Howard as John Larabee
- John Landis as Dr. Edwards
- Robert Beecher as Mr. Foster
- David Sinaiko as Buddy

== Production ==
After the wild success of Body Chemistry, Roger Corman rushed a sequel into production. Kristine Peterson did not return to direct the sequel and Adam Simon, who was offered to direct the original film, but declined due to his commitments on Brain Dead was hired instead. Lisa Pescia is the only cast member to return from the original.

== Release ==
The film was released by the same labels in the United States and the UK that released the original film, RCA/Columbia Pictures Home Video and 20:20 Vision respectively. Lawrence Cohn gave the film a middling review in Variety saying Harrison "gives a sincere performance as a deeply troubled fellow" but that "Pescia is a one-dimensional, sexy villain". He adds that "Simon provides some style in his use of flashbacks, but the film crudely missteps by recycling a sex scene from Concorde's Naked Obsession; the old footage doesn't match." Adrian Martin gave the film three stars, criticizing "Every scene is an elemental amalgam of sex, violence and madness – centred here especially on a disturbed gentleman (Gregory Harrison) whose psychosis is, as Pescia patiently explains, a result of "severe parental discipline, forced body contact sports, repressed homosexuality: the oldest story in the book" but adds "The intriguing aspect of the Body Chemistry films is that, in comparison to big-budget thrillers like Fatal Attraction, there is no pretence at psychological depth or social comment." TV Guide labeled the film as sexist, commenting "The (mostly male) filmmakers underscore their obvious paranoia about strong, dominant women with heavy film noir trappings--never before have so many Venetian blinds cast so many patterned shadows."

The film was later released on DVD in the United States on May 22, 2001, by Concorde Home Video, It was later released as a double feature with the original film, as The Body Chemistry Collection on DVD in 2003.

== Sequels ==
The film was followed by a further two sequels following the character of Claire Archer, Point of Seduction: Body Chemistry III and Body Chemistry IV: Full Exposure, but neither starred Lisa Pescia. The role was recast with Shari Shattuck in Point of Seduction and Shannon Tweed in Full Exposure.
