= Point of Seduction: Body Chemistry III =

- Directed by: Jim Wynorski
- Screenplay by: Jackson Barr
- Produced by: Andrew Stevens; Roger Corman; Mike Elliott
- Starring: Andrew Stevens; Morgan Fairchild; Shari Shattuck; Chick Vennera; Robert Forster; Stella Stevens
- Cinematography: Don E. FauntLeRoy
- Edited by: Terry J. Chiappe
- Music by: Chuck Cirino
- Production company: New Horizons
- Distributed by: New Horizons Home Video (VHS); Multicom Entertainment Group (International); 101 Films (United Kingdom)
- Release date: February 23, 1994
- Running time: 83 minutes
- Country: United States
- Language: English

Point of Seduction: Body Chemistry III (also known as Body Chemistry 3) is a 1994 erotic thriller sequel directed by Jim Wynorski and written by Jackson Barr. It is the third film in the Body Chemistry franchise and the first not to feature Lisa Pescia as psychotic sexologist Dr. Claire Archer and is Shari Shattuck's only appearance as the character.

== Plot ==
Freddie Summers (Chick Vennera) pitches a film based on the life of Dr. Claire Archer to studio head Bob Sibley (Robert Forster) and Sibley assigns producer Alan Clay (Andrew Stevens) to the project. However, when Dr. Archer (Shari Shattuck) refuses to sign off on the script because of the involvement of Summers. But with his career riding on this project, Clay is determined to have Archer's approval. They begin a torrid affair behind the back of Clay's wife and proposed lead actress, Beth (Morgan Fairchild) and over the protests of Summers who has firsthand experience of just how dangerous Dr. Archer can be.

== Cast ==
- Andrew Stevens as Alan Clay
- Shari Shattuck as Dr. Claire Archer
- Morgan Fairchild as Beth Chaney
- Chick Vennera as Freddie Summers
- Robert Forster as Bob Sibley
- Stella Stevens as Frannie Sibley
- Delia Sheppard as Wilhemina

== Production ==
Roger Corman greenlit the script from Jackson Barr in March 1993. The original script by Jackson Barr was heavily revised by Jim Wynorski and Karen Kelly, who would go on to write the follow-up. The film features two returning characters, Dr. Claire Archer (originally played by Lisa Pescia, now played by Shari Shattuck) and Freddie Summers (originally played by David Kagen, now played by Chick Vennera). Lisa Pescia was replaced as incoming director Wynorski wanted someone younger in the role. The film was listed for sale at MIFED (Mercato internazionale del film e del documentario) in October 1994 along with the sequel Body Chemistry IV: Full Exposure.

== Release ==
The film was originally aimed to have a theatrical release from Overseas Filmgroup but was released direct-to-video by New Horizons Home Video instead.

TV Guide gave the film a negative review, singling out Shari Shattuck and Andrew Stevens for particular criticism, "Lisa Pescia played the triumphant villainess in earlier Body Chemistry outings, and her matured, haughty sensuality is sorely missed; Shari Shattuck comes across as an ingenue who looks luscious with clothes off but is hardly worth dying for, and Stevens (who has played this same fall-guy role innumerable times) can't fill in the blanks." Joe Bob Briggs was kinder when reviewing the film saying "Well, obviously, there's a little bit too much plot getting in the way of the story, but when we get down to the nitty gritty, it's a pretty decent Nekkid-Body Animal-Sex Black-Widow Breastarama. It's no Body Chemistry Two but it's okay." and ultimately recommending the film, "Three stars. Joe Bob says check it out!"

== Franchise ==
The film was followed by a direct sequel, Body Chemistry IV: Full Exposure, picking up minutes after the finale of this movie. Despite this, Shari Shattuck did not return for the role and was replaced by Shannon Tweed.
