= Body Chemistry =

Body Chemistry may refer to:

- Body Chemistry (film series)
  - Body Chemistry (1990 film), the first film in the series
- "Body Chemistry", by the Drums from Brutalism (2019)

== See also ==
- Composition of the human body
