= Everett Chambers (actor) =

American actor and film producer (born 1926)

Everett Chambers (born August 19, 1926) is an American actor and film producer. He was nominated for five Primetime Emmy Awards in the categories Outstanding Drama Series, Outstanding New Series and Outstanding Limited Series.

In 1961, Chambers starred as Benny Flowers in the film Too Late Blues, starring along with Bobby Darin and Stella Stevens.
