= War of the Worlds: Goliath =

2012 Malaysian animated science fiction war film

- Directed by: Joe Pearson
- Written by: Joe Pearson; David Abramowitz
- Produced by: Joe Pearson; Kevin Eastman; Leon Tan
- Starring: Peter Wingfield; Adrian Paul; Tony Eusoff; Elizabeth Gracen; Jim Byrnes; Rob Middleton; Mark Sheppard; Matt Letscher; Adam Baldwin
- Music by: Luka Kuncevic
- Production companies: Studio Climb; Sun Min Image Pictures
- Release date: 15 November 2012
- Running time: 82 minutes
- Countries: Malaysia; United States
- Language: English
- Box office: RM 280,000

War of the Worlds: Goliath is a 2012 Malaysian animated alternate history science fiction war film directed by Joe Pearson from a screenplay he co-write with David Abramowitz, and serving as a loose sequel to H. G. Wells' 1898 novel The War of the Worlds. Produced by Tripod Group, Studio Climb and Sun Min Image Pictures, the stars the voices of Peter Wingfield, Adrian Paul, Tony Eusoff, Elizabeth Gracen, Jim Byrnes, Rob Middleton, Mark Sheppard, Matt Letscher, Adam Baldwin and other voice actors. Its title refers to the human tripod the main characters use in the film.

Set in an alternate 1914, fifteen years after the events of the 1898 novel during the potential onset of the Great War as Europe's fragile alliance begins to shatter. The story follows Eric Wells commands the "Goliath," a 65-foot Achilles-class human tripod as the Martians launches a second invasion of Earth with upgraded, bacteria-resistant tripods.

The film was released in 15 November 2012 in Malaysia and 7 March 2014 in the United States and received negative reviews from critics for poor animation quality, clichéd writing, and lack of emotional depth, with the Los Angeles Times calling it "violent, messily drawn and lifelessly dragging" and The New York Times calling it "remarkably uninvolving".

== Plot ==
In 1899, the Martians has launched an unprovoked attack on Earth's major nations, killing 140 million people and destroying many of the world's great cities. In the ruins of Leeds, England, 10-year-old Eric Wells and his parents hid in a destroyed church while a Martian Tripod patrolled the area. As they attempted to escape, the Tripod spotted them and fired its heat ray. They narrowly avoided the blast. Eric froze in horror as the Tripod fired at him, instantly killing his father, who was rushing to protect him, and subsequently killing his mother. Before it can kill him, the Martian Tripod suddenly dies. It has no defense against Earth's bacteria, causing it to keel forward and crash into the ground in front of Eric.

15 years later, in 1914, 25 year old Eric arrived at the headquarters of the A.R.E.S. (Allied Resistance Earth Squadrons) organization in Manhattan, New York City where it along with Earth has become a dieselpunk/steampunk-like world using reverse engineered Martian technology. During an assembly of 2,000 soldiers from around the world where it is being held by the strict Russian General Sergei Kushnirov, who lost his family to the Martians in 1899 at St. Petersburg, Russia leaving only his son Dimitri left, Secretary of War Theodore Roosevelt (who forsook a second term as President of the United States), and Professor Nikola Tesla, an enigmatic Serbian scientist who reverse-engineered the Martian technology and created the war materials explains about the first, failed Martian invasion and founding of A.R.E.S with Tesla informing the assembly that he discovered military codes from Mars, believing that the Martians are planning a second invasion at an unknown time, much to the shock of everyone. Eric and his team which is initially composed of American Lieutenant Jennifer Carter, Irish Corporal Patrick O'Brien, Canadian Sergeant Abraham Douglas, and Malayan Lieutenant Raja Iskandar Shah receive the first of a new type of steam-powered, Achilles-class Battle Tripod, (65 feet tall, armed with heavy machine guns and 6 light rockets, a heat ray and an 88 mm cannon) who nicknames his new tripod 'The Goliath'. As his crew are preparing to engage another group of Tripods in a simulated war game against Japanese Captain Sakai at a bar which almost led to a brawl after a German soldier insulted Theodore, Sergei arrived and informed them that Archduke Franz Ferdinand is assassinated in Sarajevo leading to the A.R.E.S. alliance to be threatened. The A.R.E.S. members are forced to be called back to their respective countries in preparation for the coming Great War, but Eric, outraged at the stupidity of the human politicians and leaders, convinces everyone to stay and prepare for the coming Martian invasion.

This proves to be advantageous, the following morning as during the simulated War Games, as Eric and the other human Tripods are attacked by the Martians using more advanced, 100 foot tall, heat ray spewing, tripod battle machines, and are now resistant to Earth's bacteria, Their return triggers Eric's memories of his parents' death but they are destroyed by Eric and his team along with the other tripods led by Sakai as a second, more ruthless, Martian invasion begins. During the debrief Kurshnirov informs the team, that was just a probing attack to judge A.R.E.S.' combat potential as the real invasion began.

The Martians landed on various countries and A.R.E.S. are deployed to repel the invasion. Kurshnirov sets an ambush at New Mexico for some of the tripods and on knowing 3 Tripods had broken off, sends Eric's team to hunt the three Tripods. Eric and his team destroys two tripods with the aid of the local militia, with only Eric's crew and Wilson, a member of the militia, surviving the encounter. Wilson leads Eric to a factory which the Martians are using as a base. They discover that the Martians are capturing and harvesting humans, and building weapons for the invasion. The prisoners are rescued and the factory then destroyed. The Leviathan, A.R.E.S.'s flying warship, then arrives to evacuate the team.

Kurshnirov briefs Eric that the attacks were a feint to draw out A.R.E.S.'s forces out of New York and the Martians had attacked A.R.E.S.'s headquarters. New York is overrun with Roosevelt holding the A.R.E.S.'s base. The Martians breach the base and the Leviathan and Agemmon, A.R.E.S.'s other floating warship, arrive to relieve the siege and Roosevelt regains the base. Together, they destroy all the Martians in New York.

As they are celebrating their victory, a large Martian spacecraft emerges from the waters near Liberty Island in New York Harbor. The spacecraft attacks A.R.E.S.'s base with devastating effects with its heat rays. Leviathan and Agemmon concentrate their attacks on the Martian spacecraft which causes it to attack both warships. Agemmon is then destroyed in a heat ray attack. The Leviathan flies low to avoid the heat rays while trying to get closer to it. A destroyed building falls on the Leviathan's bridge and caused it to crash to the buildings on its side. The crash causes Dimitri to fall off the bridge but he manages to cling to the side of the warship. GKurshnirov attempts to save his son but he lets go of General Kurshnirov's hands to allow General Kurshnirov to regain control of the Leviathan. He calls out to General Kurshnirov "I love you, Father." as he falls to his death. Kurshnirov regains control of the Leviathan and steer the warship in a collision course with the Martian spacecraft. They collide together and are destroyed, ending the invasion.

Roosevelt rallies the survivors to rebuild Earth and bring the war to Mars.

== Novelization ==
Retro Rocket Press, an imprint of digital publisher KHP Publishers, Inc., published an official novelization by science fiction author Adam J. Whitlatch on 28 October 2014. The novel was taken out of print with the closing of KHP in late 2015.

The novelization was republished by Latchkey Press on 31 July 2018, marking the novel’s first publication in paperback.
