= The Hard Truth =

- Directed by: Kristine Peterson
- Written by: Jonathan Tydor
- Produced by: Brad Southwick; Gary DePew
- Starring: Eric Roberts; Michael Rooker; Lysette Anthony
- Cinematography: Ross Berryman
- Edited by: Kert Vander Meulen
- Music by: Daniel Licht
- Production company: Force Majeure
- Distributed by: Promark Entertainment Group; Spectator Films
- Release date: May 18, 1994 (Cannes)
- Running time: 100 minutes
- Country: United States
- Language: English

The Hard Truth is a 1994 American action crime thriller film directed by Kristine Peterson and starring Eric Roberts, Michael Rooker and Lysette Anthony.

== Premise ==
A recently suspended cop blackmails an electronics expert to help him steal $3 million from his girlfriend's boss, a corrupt councilman with ties to the mob.

== Cast ==
- Eric Roberts as Dr. Chandler Etheridge
- Michael Rooker as Jonah Mantz
- Lysette Anthony as Lisa Kantrell

== Reception ==
David Rooney of Variety gave the film a negative review and wrote that it "provides few surprises but should prove serviceable enough as video fare".

Glenn Kenny of Entertainment Weekly graded the film a C− and wrote that director Peterson "pads The Hard Truth with pointless action scenes and sexual interludes that stretch this should-have-been-80-minutes trifle to 100".
