= Something for Joey =

1977 television film directed by Lou Antonio

- Genre: Drama; Sport
- Written by: Jerry McNeely
- Directed by: Lou Antonio
- Starring: Geraldine Page; Marc Singer
- Music by: David Shire
- Country of origin: United States
- Original language: English

Production
- Producer: Jerry McNeely
- Production location: University Park, Pennsylvania
- Cinematography: Gayne Rescher
- Editor: Gary Griffin
- Running time: 96 minutes
- Production company: MTM Enterprises

Original release
- Network: CBS
- Release: April 6, 1977

Something for Joey is a 1977 American made-for-television sport drama film about the relationship between college football player John Cappelletti (portrayed by Marc Singer), and his younger brother Joey (Jeff Lynas). Other cast members included Geraldine Page, Linda Kelsey and Steve Guttenberg. It appeared on the CBS television network.

== Plot ==
Joey battled leukemia since the age of three, and was one of the first children to undergo chemotherapy for the disease. The story traces John through his years at Penn State seeking the Heisman Trophy, and Joey his preteens, as each brother inspires the other, and their family around them, to try harder in life.

John wins the Heisman during a downturn in Joey's illness. During his acceptance speech, John names Joey as his prime motivator, then gradually breaks down in tears, as he tells everyone he wants Joey to have his trophy, for inspiring him and for enduring so much difficulty with leukemia. The whole Cappelletti family is there, and Joey runs to John's side.

The film ends by revealing Joey succumbed to his leukemia and died with John by his side on April 8, 1976.

== Cast ==
- Geraldine Page as Anne Cappelletti
- Gerald S. O'Loughlin as John Cappelletti Sr
- Marc Singer as John Cappelletti
- Jeffrey Lynas as Joey Cappelletti
- Paul Picerni as Joe Paterno
- Kathleen Beller as Jean Cappelletti
- Linda Kelsey as Joyce Cappelletti (also Narrator)
- Steve Guttenberg as Michael Cappelletti
- James Karen as Dr. Wingreen

== Reception ==
The film was adapted from a best-selling biography of the brothers, and was well presented and well received. It also appeared later on home video in 1995. It was the most-viewed prime-time television show of the week upon its first airing in April 1977. The movie got 96% on Rotten Tomatoes.

== Home media ==
The film was released by MTM Home Video in 1995 on VHS.

== Nominations ==
The film was nominated for Outstanding Directing in a Special Program - Drama or Comedy and Outstanding Writing in a Special Program - Drama or Comedy - Original Teleplay at the Emmy Awards, as well as for the Golden Globe Best Motion Picture Made for TV in 1978.

== See also ==
- List of American football films
