= Lower Level =

- Promotional release poster
- Directed by: Kristine Peterson
- Screenplay by: Joel Soisson
- Story by: W.K. Border; Hillary Black; Michael Leahy
- Produced by: W.K. Border; Michael Leahy
- Starring: Jeff Yagher; David Bradley; Elizabeth Gracen
- Cinematography: Wally Pfister
- Edited by: Nina Gilberti
- Music by: Terry Plumeri
- Production companies: Walrus Productions; NEO Motion Pictures; First Look International
- Distributed by: Republic Pictures Home Video
- Release dates: 5 October 1991 (South Korea); 16 January 1992 (United States)
- Running time: 1:28:40
- Country: United States
- Language: English

Lower Level is a 1991 American erotic thriller film directed by Kristine Peterson, and written by Hillary Black, W.K. Border, Michael Leahy, and Joel Soisson.

The film features a female architect with an unfulfilling love life, who records her fantasies in journals. She has unwittingly attracted a stalker, who has already read her private journals. The stalker tries to both capture the architect and to kill the architect's yuppie boyfriend.

== Plot ==
Frustrated by Craig, her inattentive yuppie boyfriend, architect Hillary White dreams of being swept off of her feet by a white knight, fantasies which she writes about in the journals that she keeps hidden in her office at Figueroa Plaza. While leaving work one night, Hillary and a visiting Craig become stuck in the parking garage due to the machinations of Sam, a security guard who is obsessed with Hillary, to the extent that he murders a businesswoman who had obliviously threatened his plans for her. After covertly causing Craig to fall down an elevator shaft, something which goes unnoticed by Hillary, Sam restarts the lifts, and awkwardly attempts to woo Hillary. When Hillary storms off, outraged over the discovery that Sam had been reading her diaries, a pair of servicemen arrive to look into a fire alarm that Hillary had earlier set off, and are shot to death in front of her by a distraught Sam. Sam captures Hillary and locks her in a secret lounge that contains a shrine dedicated to her, and then goes to hide the bodies of the two workmen, realizing while doing so that Craig is still alive and is searching for Hillary.

Sam incapacitates Craig with a trap, but is unable to kill him due being out of bullets, so he returns to Hillary. Hillary begins seducing Sam, distracting him and allowing her to stab him in the back with a piece of glass, giving her the chance to escape and reunite with Craig. The two try to escape from the sealed building through a tunnel in a storage area, but they find it blocked off, and so are forced to try and fight Sam off, which they do by luring him into a trap that leaves him hanging upside-down from an elevator.

While Hillary breaks through the office tower's front door with a piece of construction equipment that she had unearthed, Sam frees himself, and forces Hillary to meet him on the roof by announcing over the PA system that he will find and murder the wounded Craig if she leaves the building. At the rendezvous point, a melancholic Sam handcuffs himself to Hillary and threatens to kill them both by leaping off of the roof. Craig appears, grabs Hillary, and professes both his love and willingness to die for her, which finally causes Sam to realize that Craig genuinely does care about Hillary, and that he himself is unworthy of winning over Hillary. After removing his and Hillary's shackles, Sam jumps to his death.

== Cast ==
- David Bradley as Sam L. Browning
- Elizabeth Gracen as Hillary White
- Jeff Yagher as Craig Fulson
- Shari Shattuck as Dawn Simms
- David H. Sterry as Dwight
- Luis Contreras as Street Person
- Eric Fleeks as J.R. Merdrew
- David Ross Wolfe as Ansel Spears

== Reception ==
Joe Kane, author of The Phantom of the Movies' Videoscope: The Ultimate Guide to the Latest, Greatest, and Weirdest Genre Videos, called the film "a down-scale Die Hard" and gave it a grade of 2½. TV Guide awarded Lower Level a score 1 out of 4, and found that while it was "glossy" and excelled in its use of sound to build suspense, the film was ultimately brought down by both its severely padded plot and "the cast behaving like idiots to prevent the tale from finishing early or logically". Empire gave the "enjoyably contrived" film a 2 out of 5, praising the effective suspense sequences, yet criticizing the uncharismatic leads that prevented it "from achieving its potential".

== See also ==
- P2, a similar film released in 2007
