= Elizabeth Gracen =

American actress (born 1961)

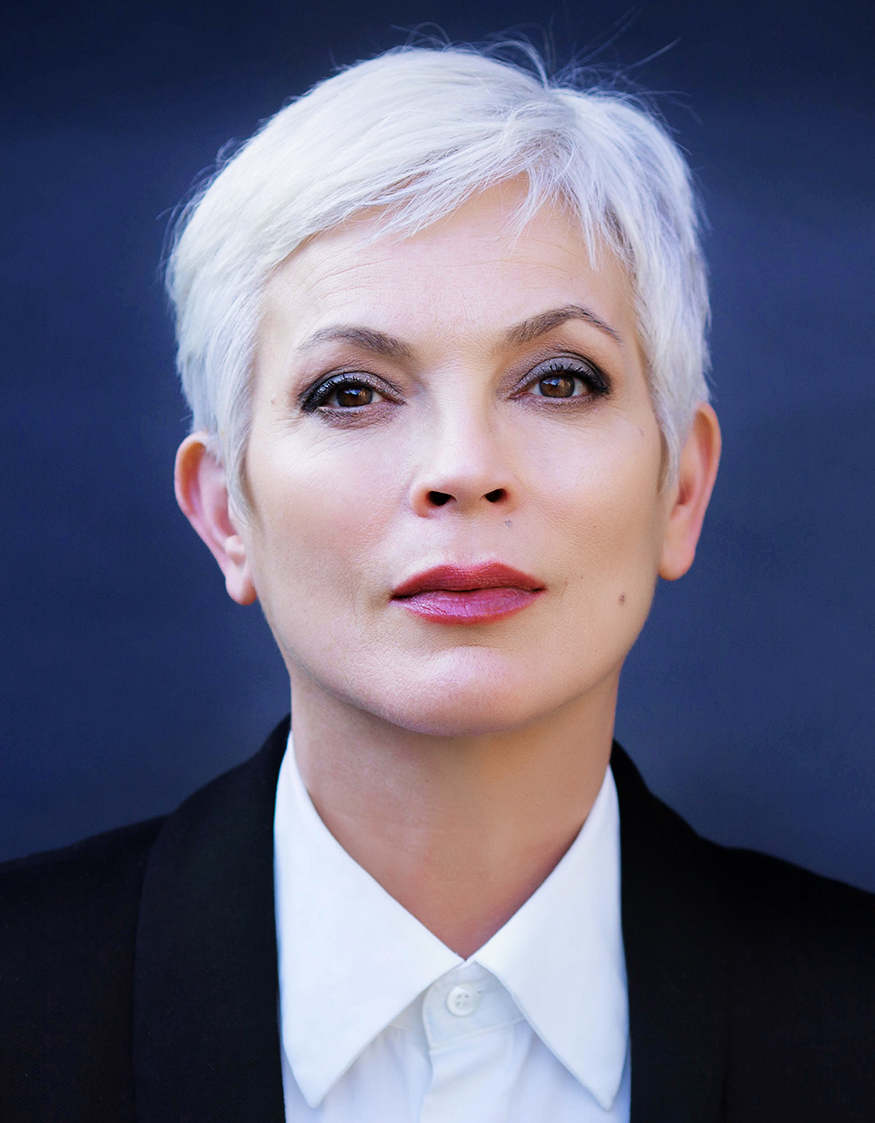
- Gracen in 2016
- Born: Elizabeth Grace Ward; April 3, 1961 (age 65); Ozark, Arkansas, U.S.
- Education: HB Studios
- Occupation: Actress
- Title: Miss Arkansas 1981; Miss America 1982
- Predecessor: Susan Powell
- Successor: Debra Maffett
- Spouses: Jon Birmingham (m. 1982; div. 1984) Brendan Hughes (m. 1989; div. 1994): Adam Murphy (present)
- Children: 1
- Website: www.flapperfilms.com

Elizabeth Ward Gracen (born Elizabeth Grace Ward, April 3, 1961) is an American actress, film producer and director. She was a beauty pageant contestant, winning Miss America 1982 title.

== Early life and education ==
Elizabeth Grace Ward was born on April 3, 1961, in Ozark, Arkansas, the daughter of Patricia Hampe, a nurse, and Jimmy Young Ward, a poultry worker. She was raised in Booneville, Arkansas. The family later moved to Russellville, Arkansas, where Ward dated University of Arkansas trainer Mike Walker and graduated from Russellville High School in 1979. She was a junior accounting major at Arkansas Tech University at the time she entered the Miss America contest. Instead of returning to Arkansas Tech, she used her Miss America scholarship money to study acting at HB Studios in New York City.

== Career ==
=== Pageants and modeling ===
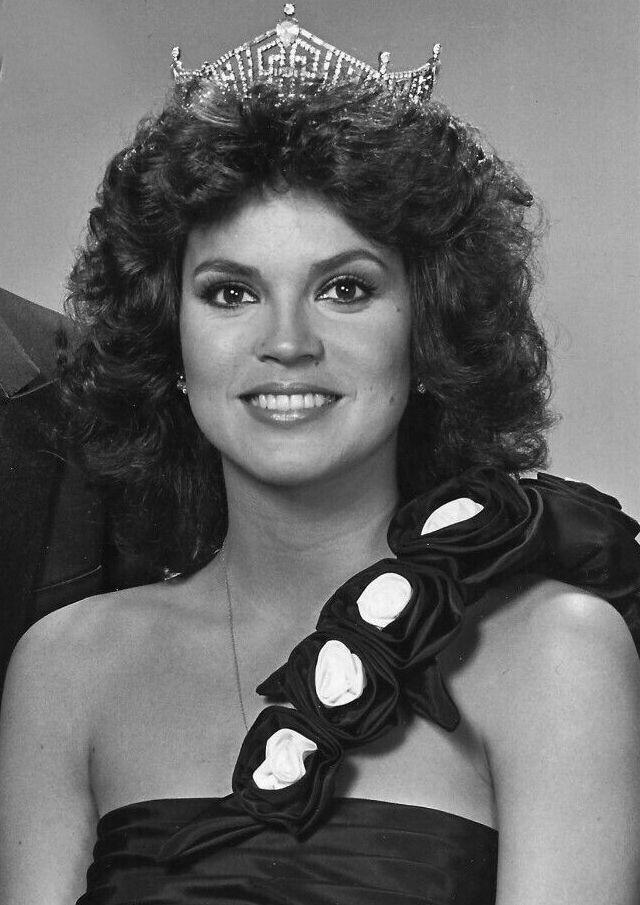
Gracen as Miss America 1982

Gracen won the titles of Miss Arkansas in 1981 and Miss America in 1982. After her yearlong work as Miss America, she enrolled in acting classes then relocated to California to pursue a film and television career.

Gracen posed nude for Playboy magazine's May 1992 issue.

=== Acting ===
Gracen made her professional feature film debut in Three for the Road with Charlie Sheen. Her film credits also include a featured role in Marked for Death, opposite Steven Seagal, Pass The Ammo with Tim Curry, and the CBS feature 83 Hours Till Dawn with Peter Strauss and Robert Urich. Gracen starred in Lower Level and Discretion Assured with Michael York.

On television, Gracen has appeared in Shelley Duvall's Strange Case of Dr. Jekyll and Mr. Hyde, Sidney Sheldon's The Sands of Time, and The Death of the Incredible Hulk. She also appeared with a starring role in the series Extreme for NBC and the syndicated series Renegade and Queen of Swords.

Gracen's best-known acting role has been as the recurring character Amanda, a 1,200-year-old immortal, in the series Highlander: The Series and its spin-off series Highlander: The Raven.

In December 1999, Gracen filed for bankruptcy protection. After few television guest roles, and a supporting role in the made-for-television movie Interceptor Force 2, she took a long leave of absence from acting, beginning in 2002. Gracen began doing voiceover work for Blue Hours Productions, which has revived the classic radio anthology Suspense, airing on SiriusXM. In 2012, Gracen did a character voice-over in the Malaysian animated science fiction film War of the Worlds: Goliath.

=== Directing, producing, and writing ===
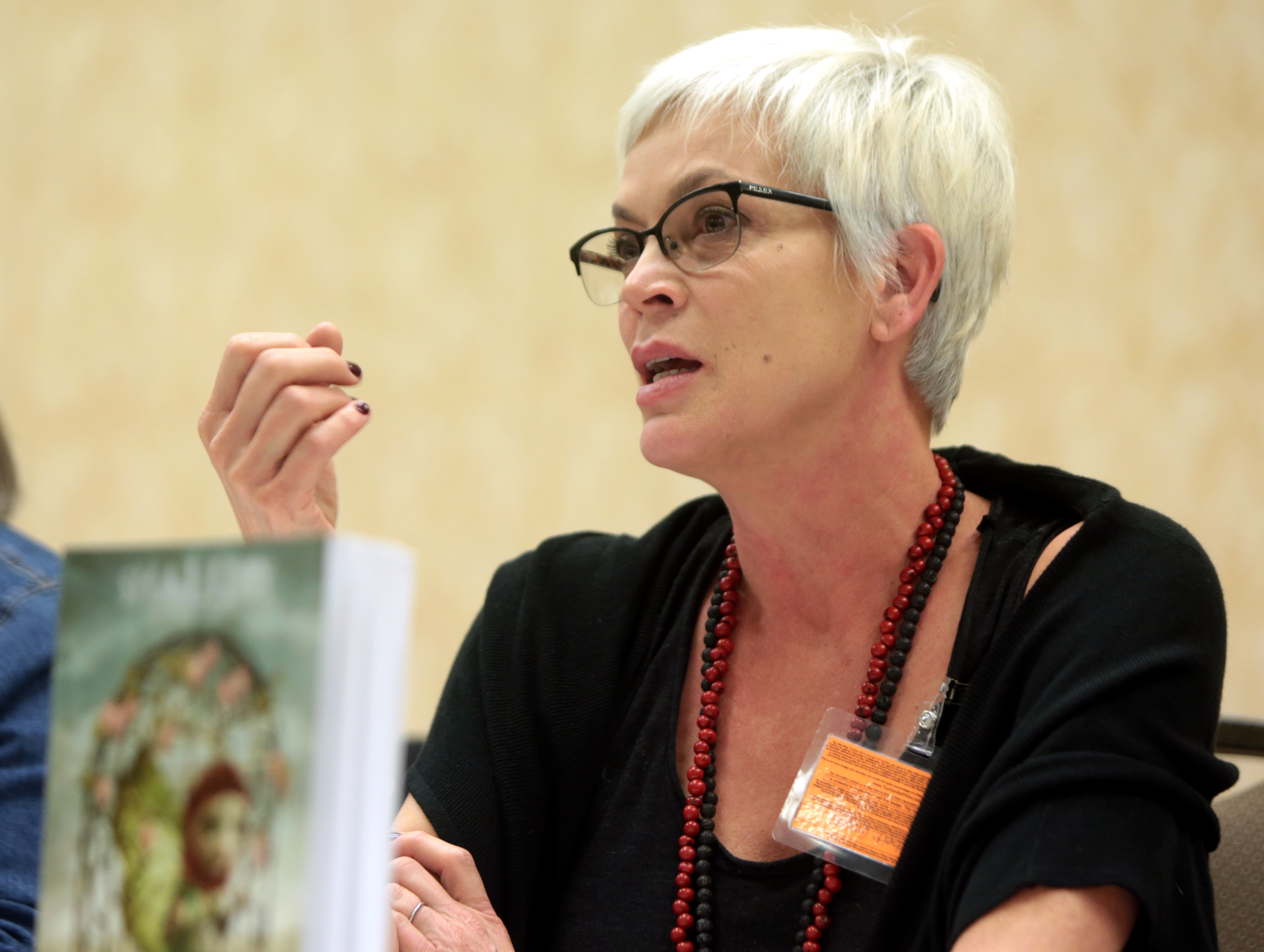
Gracen, speaking about writing at TusCon 43 in Tucson, Arizona (2016)

In 2012, Gracen formed Flapper Films. In 2014, she starred in Coherence, a sci-fi indie thriller. In January 2016, Gracen established Flapper Press and self-published Shalilly, a young adult fantasy novel.

Gracen made her directorial debut with a documentary short, "The Damn Deal", about three young drag queens from Arkansas who compete in female impersonator beauty pageants.

== Personal life ==
=== Marriages and family ===
Gracen married Jon Birmingham in 1982, and they divorced in 1984.

In 1989, while filming Sundown: The Vampire in Retreat, she met actor Brendan Hughes, and they married soon after. They divorced in 1994.

Gracen married Adam Murphy, and they have a daughter.

=== Affair with Bill Clinton ===
According to Gracen, some time in 1983, she had a one-night stand with future President Bill Clinton when he was Governor of Arkansas. She was married at the time, as was he.

In 1992, rumors swirled that Gracen had had an affair with Clinton. At first, Gracen dismissed this claim (as requested by Clinton's campaign manager Mickey Kantor); however, in spring 1998 Gracen recanted her six-year-old denial and stated she had a one-night stand with Clinton in 1983. Gracen stated that "What I did was wrong, and I feel very, very bad about it now. My behavior was inappropriate -- that's just the bottom line" and publicly apologized to Hillary Clinton.

After her claim, Independent Counsel Kenneth Starr, who was investigating Clinton in the Paula Jones lawsuit, issued a subpoena to have her testify to her claim in court. However, Gracen eluded the subpoena and was at one point able to avoid it because Highlander: The Raven was being filmed outside of the US. Paula Jones's legal team was also unable to track down Gracen because she had made unscheduled trips to Las Vegas and the Caribbean.

== Filmography ==
- Three for the Road (1987) Nadine
- Pass the Ammo (1988) Christie Lynn
- The Strange Case of Dr. Jekyll and Mr. Hyde (1989)
- Lisa (1989) Mary
- The Death of the Incredible Hulk (1990) Jasmin
- Marked for Death (1990) Melissa
- The Flash (1990 TV Series) 1 episode - Celia Wayne
- 83 Hours 'Til Dawn (1990) Maria Ranfield
- Sundown: The Vampire in Retreat (1991) Alice
- Lower Level (1992) Hillary
- The Sands of Time (1992)
- Final Mission (1993) Caitlin Cole
- Time Trax episode 7 (1993) Sydney
- Discretion Assured (1993) Miranda
- Highlander: The Series (1992–1998) Amanda
- Renegade: The Series (1992–1997) Rikki Yeager
- Murder, She Wrote (1994) Michelle Scarlotti
- The Expert (1995) Liz Pierce
- Extreme (1995) Callie Manners
- Kounterfeit (1996) Bridgette
- Highlander: The Raven (1998–1999) Amanda
- Queen of Swords "Counterfeit Queen" (2000) Carlotta
- Charmed "Bite Me" (2002) Vampire Queen
- Interceptor Force 2 (2002) Adriana Sikes
- War of the Worlds: Goliath (2012) Lt. Jennifer Carter (voice)
- Coherence (2013) Beth

Awards and achievements
Preceded by Susan Powell	Miss America; 1982	Succeeded by Debra Maffett
Preceded by Lencola Sullivan	Miss Arkansas; 1981	Succeeded by Micki Petrus
Preceded by Bobbie Candler	National Sweetheart; 1980	Succeeded by Gloria Gilbert
