= Too Late Blues =

1961 musical drama film by John Cassavetes

- Theatrical release poster
- Directed by: John Cassavetes
- Written by: Richard Carr; John Cassavetes
- Produced by: John Cassavetes
- Starring: Bobby Darin; Stella Stevens; Everett Chambers
- Cinematography: Lionel Lindon A.S.C.
- Edited by: Frank Bracht, A.C.E.
- Music by: David Raksin
- Distributed by: Paramount Pictures
- Release dates: November 7, 1961 (France); February 28, 1962 (USA)
- Running time: 103 minutes
- Country: United States
- Language: English
- Budget: $750,000

Too Late Blues is a 1961 black-and-white American musical drama film directed by John Cassavetes and starring Bobby Darin, Stella Stevens and Everett Chambers. It is the story of jazz musician "Ghost" Wakefield and his relationship with both his fellow band members and his love interest, Jess, a beautiful would-be singer. The film was written by Cassavetes and Richard Carr.

It was the first film that Cassavetes produced for a major Hollywood studio, Paramount, and Darin's first nonsinging role.

== Plot ==
John "Ghost" Wakefield is the leader of a struggling jazz band. At a party he meets the attractive singer Jessica "Jess" Polanski, who is in a relationship with Ghost's agent, Benny Flowers. At Ghost's insistence, she joins the band, and he begins a relationship with her, antagonizing Benny.

Benny arranges for the band to cut a record. In a party at a bar celebrating the recording session, Benny encourages a tough guy, Tommy, to pick a fight with the band. Ghost avoids fighting, causing a rift with Jess, and immediately afterwards with the rest of the band. Jess leaves the band, and it breaks up. Ghost becomes the protege of a rich patron, playing the piano in night clubs, his career in decline, while the rest of the band plays inferior music to make a living.

Ghost locates Jess, who has become a prostitute, and goes with her to the other band members, who reject him but begin playing their old music with Jess singing.

== Cast ==
- Bobby Darin as John "Ghost" Wakefield
- Stella Stevens as Jessica "Jess" Polanski
- Everett Chambers as Benny Flowers
- Nick Dennis as Nick Bubalinas
- Vincent Edwards as Tommy
- Val Avery as Milt Frielobe
- Marilyn Clark as The Countess
- James Joyce as Reno Vitelli
- Rupert Crosse as Baby Jackson
- Mario Gallo as Recording engineer
- J. Alan Hopkins as Skipper
- Cliff Carnell as Charlie
- Richard O. Chambers as Pete
- Seymour Cassel as Red
- Dan Stafford as Shelley
- Slim Gaillard as himself

== Special recordings by (as listed in opening credits) ==
- Shelly Manne, Drums
- Red Mitchell, Bass
- Jimmy Rowles, Piano
- Benny Carter, Saxophone
- Uan Rasey, Trumpet
- Milt Bernhart, Trombone

== Production ==
The film's musical score was by David Raksin, and was performed by eminent musicians, including Benny Carter. Cassavetes wanted Montgomery Clift and Gena Rowlands, his wife and frequent leading lady, for the main roles, and the production of the film was rushed. However, the production of the film was less traumatic for Cassavetes than he would experience with A Child Is Waiting (1963), his other early studio film, which was taken from him during editing. Announcements about the projected film appeared in December 1960, February 1961 and July 1961, when two photographs of Stella Stevens being directed by two actors, Edmond O'Brien in Man-Trap and John Cassavetes in Too Late Blues (the second photograph included Bobby Darin), were published in The New York Times Sunday Magazine.

Billed 4th in the film's credits, Nick Dennis, who portrays a bar owner named "Nick" and 5th-billed Vincent Edwards, playing "Tommy", the tough guy encouraged by Benny to start a fight with "Ghost", were both cast, at the time, in the long-running (1961–66) medical series, Ben Casey, with Edwards playing the title role of the uncompromisingly ill-tempered neurosurgeon and Dennis at the bottom of the supporting cast as the hospital orderly named, again, "Nick". The series was already cast and production on initial episodes started when press notices announcing the upcoming series were published in TV columns during mid-May 1961. It is unclear whether a halt in the filming of Ben Casey, which premiered as part of ABC's Monday night schedule on October 2, 1961, enabled Dennis and Edwards to fit their scenes into Cassavetes' schedule or if his brief 30-day shoot for the film had already wrapped by the time production started on Ben Casey. Cassavetes and Edwards had known each other since they were classmates at the American Academy of Dramatic Arts in the late 1940s. In 1955 they both co-starred as escaped convicts in Andrew L. Stone's The Night Holds Terror and the following year portrayed brothers in conflict over their father's legacy in "The Last Patriarch", the November 28, 1956, episode of The 20th Century Fox Hour. Nick Dennis had also worked with Cassavetes when he played a supporting role in "The Poet's Touch", the November 26, 1959 episode of Cassavetes' series, Johnny Staccato. Another familiar face among the cast of Too Late Blues, playing a member of the band, was Seymour Cassel, who appeared in most of Cassavetes films over the years.

== Critical reception ==
At the time of its release, the film received a poor reception from critics and had a mediocre box office performance. Darin's acting was criticized, as was the film's plot.

At the release of a DVD of the film in 2012 however, Dennis Lim of the Los Angeles Times said Darin and Stevens were surprisingly good in the lead roles, with Darin "willing to appear both arrogant and weak", and Stevens proving her "range and nerve". He also praised Chambers' "indelible, cold-eyed performance". On Rotten Tomatoes, the film has an aggregate score of 80% based on 8 positive and 2 negative critic reviews.

== Legacy ==
The conflicts in the film paralleled Cassavetes' own difficulties adapting to the studio system, embodied by the Ghost's conflict with Benny. Ghost is portrayed as a purist dedicated only to his art, while Benny seeks to make Ghost compromise to make money. When Ghost refuses, Benny seeks to destroy him. New Yorker critic Richard Brody observed in 2012, when a DVD of the film was released, that "there’s something Beckett-like in the incantatory force of Cassavetes’s dialogue and images, as well as in his blend of degradation and exaltation."

This film and A Child Is Waiting are often viewed "as footnotes at best, or compromised failures at worst", film critic Dennis Lim commented in the Los Angeles Times in 2012. But the Cassavetes hallmarks ("the delicate way of handling emotional messiness, the tough but ultimately generous view of human behavior") were evident in the film. Lim described the film as "something like a confessional manifesto from the emerging director, 31 when he made it."

In a 1971 interview with Playboy magazine, Cassavetes lamented that Too Late Blues never had a chance. He regretted that he succumbed to studio pressure and shot the film in California, not in New York, and in only 30 days, and not the six months that he felt it needed.

The film was released on DVD and Blu-ray for the first time on May 29, 2012, by Olive Films.

== Paperback novelization ==
Concurrent with the release of the film, Lancer Books issued a novelization of the screenplay, by Stuart James (1926 – ?). James's previous published work included over 300 short stories sold to crime, mystery, adventure and men's-interest pulp magazines; five original novels of a "higher order" for paperback houses that specialized in soft-core "adult" reading, two under the pseudonym "Max Gareth"; and novelizations of Jack the Ripper, The Stranglers of Bombay, and The Enemy General, the last also as Gareth. His by-line would disappear for almost three decades until the late '80s, when he re-emerged as the author of three consecutive espionage novels published as lead titles by Bantam Books.

== See also ==
- A Child is Waiting
- Shadows
- Bobby Darrin
