= Body Chemistry IV: Full Exposure =

- Directed by: Jim Wynorski
- Screenplay by: Karen Kelly
- Produced by: Andrew Stevens
- Starring: Shannon Tweed; Larry Poindexter; Andrew Stevens; Chick Vennera; Fred Grossinger; Larry Manetti; Stella Stevens
- Cinematography: Zoran Hochstätter
- Edited by: Vanick Moradian
- Music by: Paul Di Franco
- Production company: Sunset Films International
- Distributed by: New Horizons Home Video (VHS); Multicom Entertainment Group (select territories only)
- Release date: September 19, 1995
- Running time: 80 minutes
- Country: United States
- Language: English

Body Chemistry IV: Full Exposure is a 1995 erotic thriller sequel directed by Jim Wynorski and written by Karen Kelly. It is the fourth & final film in the Body Chemistry franchise and the only one not to be written by Jackson Barr. Shannon Tweed, Larry Poindexter, Andrew Stevens, and Chick Vennera star in the film. Stella Stevens had a supporting role in the film.

== Plot ==
Dr. Claire Archer (Shannon Tweed) is arrested for the double murder of producer Alan Clay (Andrew Stevens) and Freddie Summers (Chick Vennera) and hires attorney Simon Mitchell (Larry Poindexter) to defend her at trial. Simon is highly successful at his job but becomes completely blindsided by Dr. Archer. Powerless to resist her charms, he's rapidly drawn into an ever tightening web of obsession, lust and betrayal. When his marriage begins to fall apart under the weight of his affair with his client, Simon is forced to choose between his wife and a sexual predator that will never let him go.

== Cast ==
- Shannon Tweed as Dr. Claire Archer
- Larry Poindexter as Simon Mitchell
- Andrew Stevens as Alan Clay (archive footage)
- Chick Vennera as Freddie Summers (archive footage)
- Fred Grossinger as Bob Sibley
- Larry Manetti as Derrick Richmond
- Stella Stevens as Fran Sibley
- Michael Paul Chan as Judge Hakawa

== Production ==
Sunset Films International was founded by Andrew Stevens and Jim Wynorski in 1994 and Body Chemistry IV: Full Exposure was announced as part of its inaugural slate of films alongside Skins with Linda Blair and Wings Hauser, Sorceress with Edward Albert and Julie Strain and Hard Bounty starring Matt McCoy, Kelly LeBrock and John Terlesky. In addition Dr. Archer being recast, despite being announced in pre-production materials, Robert Forster also did not appear due to scheduling conflicts and the role of Bob Sibley was played by Fred Grossinger (credited as Fred Holliday). Despite prominent billing, Andrew Stevens and Chick Vennera only appear in archive footage from the end of Body Chemistry III. Stella Stevens is the only cast member to return. When announced at Cannes Film Festival, the film was billed as "the climax of the Body Chemistry series".

== Release ==
Just like Point of Seduction: Body Chemistry III, TV Guide panned the film, saying "Body Chemistry 4 stands on its own mediocre merits; the good news is you need not view the preceding three installments in the series, riffs on the subject of a philandering fella ruled by urges he can't turn on and off. Once the camera ogles Tweed's curves, the screenplay can take a nap; viewers take one look and understand immediately what the expression "a body to die for" means." and calls Poindexter "a colorless ball of handsomeness." Meredith Berkman from Entertainment Weekly was also unimpressed, "Body Chemistry 4: Full Exposure represents the artless, tasteless side of the genre, the part that glorifies synthetic breasts and teeters on the brink of misogyny." adding that the film is "as laughable as it is predictable."

== Franchise ==
The film is the final instalment in the Body Chemistry franchise following the character of Claire Archer. It was preceded by Body Chemistry, Body Chemistry II: The Voice of a Stranger, Point of Seduction: Body Chemistry III and Body Chemistry IV: Full Exposure.
