= Stepmonster =

- Theatrical poster
- Directed by: Jeremy Stanford
- Screenplay by: Mark Thomas McGee; Craig J. Nevius
- Story by: Fred Olen Ray
- Produced by: Steven Rabiner
- Starring: Alan Thicke; George Gaynes; Ami Dolenz; Corey Feldman; Edie McClurg; John Astin
- Cinematography: Wally Pfister
- Music by: Terry Plumeri
- Distributed by: Concorde-New Horizons
- Release date: February 24, 1993
- Running time: 85 minutes
- Country: United States
- Language: English

Stepmonster is a 1993 American comedy horror film directed by Jeremy Stanford, executive produced by Roger Corman, and starring Alan Thicke, Robin Riker, George Gaynes, Ami Dolenz, Corey Feldman, Edie McClurg, John Astin, and Billy Corben. It was a direct-to-video film. After its release, it was sometimes aired on The Disney Channel.

In the film, a boy's mother is kidnapped by a shapeshifting monster, called a tropopkin. The woman is declared missing, and her husband presumes that she has died. He is not particularly concerned, as he is engaged to marry another woman. The woman in question is a shapeshifting tropopkin who intends to kill him at the next summer solstice. Her prospective stepson witnesses her killing various victims and tries to expose her real identity.

== Plot ==
Architect George Dougherty takes his family-- fun-loving wife Abby and comic book fanatic son Todd-- on a "workcation" to a lake. On the side of the road, the see a "No Hunting" sign that has crudely had the words "Except Tropopkins" added to it; Todd recognizes the word "Tropopkins" as the name of a monster from a comic he reads. Todd later hears a mysterious roar and finds a monstrous footprint.

George and Abby meet the flirtatious Denise Gore, a beautiful woman who is buying a lakeside house that George is building in the woods nearby. Later that night, Abby is captured and cocooned by a monstrous humanoid creature-- a Tropopkin. When authorities cannot find a body, she is presumed dead.

Six months later, George reveals to Todd that he's going to marry Denise, who he began dating after Abby's disappearance. She tries to bond with Todd by noting that she hates violin music after learning that Todd does as well because his father forces him to take violin lessons. Meanwhile, Abby's parents Shirley and Norman chastise George for trying to move on too quickly from Abby's death.

Todd quickly grows suspicious of Denise after catching doing strange things like gnawing on chicken-bones and walking around outside late at night and deduces that she is a Tropopkin. Denise later devours a neighbor's pet dog and a passing jogger in a monstrous Tropopkin form, and is revealed to be keeping a small creature inside a box in the Dougherty's home.

The next night George and Denise go out for a date. They hire their teenage neighbor Wendy to babysit Todd, unaware Todd has been spying on and secretly taking photos of her while she changes. She invites her boyfriend "Phlegm" over, who indulges Todd's theories about Denise being a Tropopkin. He explains that he too was a comic book fan and learned that Tropopkin's can only get get pregnant on the summer solstice-- the same day George and Denise are going to get married.

One night Todd follows Denise and watches her transform and maul a paperboy. He manages to snap a few photographs of her. He gets the photos developed and tries to show Wendy, but she is disgusted when she finds the photos Todd took of her. Todd returns home and discovers the creature that Denise is keeping in the box-- a bat-like harpy. Todd smashes furniture with a baseball bat while trying to kill it, but George doesn't believe him when he explains what happened.

While doing chores, Todd manages to trick Denise into transforming and ensnares her in a booby-trap, but she returns to her human form before George finds them. Furious, George sends Todd to a psychiatrist, Dr. Emmerson, who also dismisses his claims. Norman later takes Todd to a comic book shop where they find a comic book about how to kill Tropopkins, but it is a limited edition that costs $500.

While attempting to spy on Wendy once again, Todd sees Denise transform and try to attack her; he saves her life and convinces her that he was telling the truth. Together, they take his violin to a pawnbroker to secure a loan and get the $500 to buy the comic book. However, George finds out and angrily tears apart the comic. Meanwhile, Denise visits and kills Dr. Emmerson.

On the wedding day, Todd tries to trick Denise into transforming in front of everyone, but the plan doesn't work and she and George are married. Shortly after, he finds a piece of the comic book that reveals the Tropopkins' weakness-- violin music.

Now believing Todd, Phlegm, Norman and Wendy park outside Todd's home that night as Denise tries to seduce George. Using speakers, they blast violin music, forcing Denise to transform and revealing the truth to George. The harpy destroys the speaker cables, but George appears with a violin and plays it, killing Denise and causing her to melt into nothingness. Meanwhile, Todd kills the harpy with his baseball bat.

Sometime later, Todd and George later go hiking near the place where Abby disappeared. They discover the Tropopkins' cave, in which they find Abby still alive, having been placed in suspended animation by the cocoon. They free other captives and walk away together.

== Cast ==
- Alan Thicke as George Dougherty
- Molly Cheek as Abby Dougherty
- Robin Riker as Denise Gore
- George Gaynes as Norman
- Ami Dolenz as Wendy
- Corey Feldman as Phlegm
- Edie McClurg as Dr. Emmerson
- John Astin as Minister
- Billy Corben as Todd Dougherty

== Reception ==
Rotten Tomatoes, a review aggregator, reports that 0% of five surveyed critics gave the film a positive review; the average review is 2.4/10. TV Guide rated it 1/6 stars and wrote, "This blithely unambitious film succeeds on its own, limited terms." In a retrospective, John Campopiano of Dread Central described it as "full of ridiculous humor, a fun monster, and enjoyable cast performances".
