= Linda (1973 film) =

- Original print ad
- Based on: Linda by John D. MacDonald
- Screenplay by: Merwin Gerard
- Directed by: Jack Smight
- Starring: Stella Stevens
- Theme music composer: John Cacavas
- Countries of origin: United Kingdom; United States
- Original language: English

Production
- Producer: William Frye
- Production locations: Universal Studios - 100 Universal City Plaza, Universal City, California
- Cinematography: Leonard J. South
- Editor: Edward A. Biery
- Running time: 73 minutes
- Production company: Universal Television

Original release
- Network: ABC
- Release: November 3, 1973

Linda is a 1973 American made-for-television crime thriller film directed by Jack Smight based on the novel by John D. MacDonald. It was broadcast as part of the ABC Movie of the Week series.

== Plot ==
Paul Reston is considering leaving his wife Linda when she suddenly shoots Anne Braden. Anne's husband Jeff Braden runs to her aid and Linda appears to shoot him in the back, but when Paul brings the police to the scene Jeff is alive and accuses Paul of murdering Anne. The lovers Jeff and Linda attempt to have Paul take the fall for the crime by describing him as insane in their statements to the police. Certain that Linda and Jeff have been plotting against him, Paul hires Marshall Journeyman to defend him. Journeyman is skeptical at first but accepts the job and investigates Jeff and Linda.
One night Paul inserts a wire into a light socket and trips the fuse, causing his cell door to unlock. Paul sneaks out of his cell and escapes the prison then makes his way to Jeff and Linda and overhears them discussing the crime while hidden below a cliff overhang. Marshall Journeyman convinces the police chief to call in Jeff and Linda and convinces them that Jeff recorded their conversation by playing a tape made using voice actors. Linda calls it a farce but Jeff is frightened and insists that it was Linda's idea to actually go through with the plan. Marshall Journeyman opens the door so that Linda can hear Jeff confessing, which causes her to run in and call him spineless.
Paul is later shown visiting Linda in jail but she tells him not to pity her because she's "going to be out of this place in a flash."

== Cast ==
- Stella Stevens as Linda Reston
- Ed Nelson as Paul Reston
- John McIntire as Marshall Journeyman
- John Saxon as Jeff Braden
- Ford Rainey as Police Chief Vernon
- John Fink as Brownell
- Alan Fudge as Officer Carr
- Ross Elliott as Officer Ramsey
- Gary Morgan as Young Man
- Mary-Robin Redd as Anne Braden
- Joyce Cunning as Louella
- Barbara Sammeth as Young Woman

== Broadcast ==
The film was broadcast as the ABC Saturday Suspense Movie at 7:30 p.m. on November 3, 1973.

== Reception ==
In Encyclopedia of Television Film Directors, Jerry Roberts writes, "As Linda, Stella Stevens was pancaked, pushed-up, and slinky as the murderer of her lover's wife, and the mastermind of the frame-up of her own husband for the crime. Ed Nelson and John Saxon loitered."
