= Beyond the Silhouette =

1991 film directed by Lloyd Simandl

- Directed by: Lloyd A. Simandl
- Written by: Ted Hubert
- Produced by: John A. Curtis; Lloyd A. Simandl
- Starring: Tracy Scoggins; Marc Singer; Brion James
- Cinematography: Danny Nowak
- Edited by: Derek Whelan
- Music by: Braun Farnon; Robert Smart
- Production companies: North American Pictures; EGM International; Excalibur Pictures
- Distributed by: Nova Releasing (Canada); Prism Entertainment (U.S.); Vantage Media (International)
- Release dates: July 31, 1991 (Canada); January 30, 1992 (U.S.)
- Running time: 92 minutes
- Countries: Canada; United Kingdom
- Language: English

Beyond the Silhouette (simply titled Silhouette in some countries), is a 1991 British–Canadian erotic political thriller film directed by Lloyd A. Simandl and starring Tracy Scoggins, Marc Singer and Brion James. Scoggins plays a lawyer who mistakenly comes into possession of a brooch wanted by a shadowy organization after a chance encounter with an escort girl working for one of its members. The film was released in the U.S. as Ultimate Desires. It was negatively received, despite earning some notice for its departure from the genre's narrative conventions.

== Cast ==
- Tracy Scoggins as Samantha Stewart
- Marc Singer as Jonathan Sullivan
- Brion James as Wolfgang Friedman
- Marc Baur as David Marchant
- Saraphina Joachim as Vicky
- Marc Bennett as Pierce
- Frank Wilson as Detective Southard
- Jason Scott as Carlos

== Production ==
The film was produced by Canada's North American Pictures in partnership with Welsh company EGM International. Principal photography started on November 13 and wrapped up on December 12, 1990, under the working title Silhouette. It took place in the Vancouver metropolitan area, where North American was based, with studio interiors shot in Burnaby. The film reunited Tracy Scoggins and Marc Singer, who had just worked together on Watchers II and were good friends. Although Scoggins had appeared nude before, she acknowledged that "there are a couple of scenes that, if my mother was there, I'd be shaking the popcorn bag in front of her eyes to distract her." However, she enjoyed the freedom allowed by features compared to the standards and practices of her television work, and wished that the story could have been shot in sequence to better get into her role.

== Release ==
=== Pre-release ===
Silhouette was presented at the Winter 1991 American Film Market, in presence of Scoggins and James, although Singer could not attend. It sold about CAD$1 million worth of rights, including all U.S. video and pay TV to Prism Entertainment.

=== Home media ===
In the U.S., the film was released on January 30, 1992, by Prism Entertainment, who renamed it Ultimate Desires. The Canadian release followed one and a half month later through Nova Home Entertainment, the video division of Nova Releasing, under the title Beyond the Silhouette. It was available on VHS and Betamax. The film was also noted as a rare domestic success on the Canadian pay-per-view market, one of just two (with Scanners II) to outperform some U.S. product on the Viewers Choice service that year. In the U.K., the film debuted as Silhouette through 20/20 Vision, a label of New Age Entertainment, on July 26, 1992.

Since then, Vantage Media has internationally released an newly sourced master for the movie as Silhouette on Amazon Prime Video in a SD format, though only in the United States.

== Reception ==
Beyond the Silhouette has received largely negative reviews. Ballantine Books' Video Movie Guide dismissed it as a "[l]ow-budget time waster with an overdose of sleaze." VideoHound found that it "starts out as another sleazy video sex thriller, as the lawyer heroine discovers her sensuality and poses a lot in her underclothes. Then in the third act it become a hyper-paranoid political conspiracy assassination-o-rama. Pretty weird, Canadian-made junk." Ann Pecora of The Kalamazoo Gazette bashed a film where the term plot was "used loosely" and the term acting was "used even more loosely", asking actor Marc Singer: "Does your mother know what kind of movies you're making these days?" Sister publications The Motion Picture Annual and TV Guide noted that compared to most in its genre, Ultimate Desires "doesn’t get quite so explicit" and "certainly doesn’t lack ambition as the filmmakers expand from T&A noir into global intrigue." However, the film ended up as a "tarted-up mongrel of an erotic/political thriller that’s so overwrought it rises to tabloid-level surrealism." The film got a few more favorable reviews in the U.K., where Denis Gane of Wales on Sunday praised "a gripping tale" that is "not just about vice."

== Soundtrack ==
The soundtrack features a cover of "What About Love", a Canadian song made famous by American band Heart, performed by Vancouver-based aboriginal singer Cathy St. Germain.
