= Marc Singer =

Canadian-American actor (born 1948)

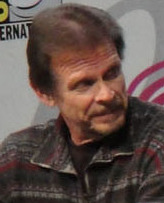
- Singer at the 2011 WonderCon
- Born: January 29, 1948 (age 78); Vancouver, British Columbia, Canada
- Citizenship: Canada; United States
- Occupations: Film, television, stage actor
- Years active: 1973–present
- Spouse: Haunani Minn (m. 1974; died 2014)
- Parents: Jacques Singer; Leslie Wright
- Relatives: Lori Singer (sister)

Marc Singer (born January 29, 1948) is a Canadian-American actor best known for his roles in the Beastmaster film series, as Mike Donovan in the original 1980s TV series V, and as Matt Cantrell in the ninth season of Dallas.

== Early life ==
Singer was born in Vancouver, British Columbia and raised in Corpus Christi, Texas. He has two brothers (Claude and Gregory) and one sister, Lori, an actress and cellist. His father, Jacques Singer, was a Polish immigrant and symphony conductor; his mother, Leslie (née Wright), a concert pianist.

== Career ==
Before the height of his career, Singer appeared in the sequel to the miniseries Roots as Col. Warner's elder son Andy. He had originally auditioned for the role of Jim Warner, but the producers felt he was better suited for the Andy Warner role.

In the 1970s, Singer had a small breakthrough role in the Planet of the Apes TV series playing a gladiator.

He found fame in the early '80s with the film The Beastmaster and its sequels, in which he played the title role, Dar, and as Mike Donovan in the 1983 miniseries V, the 1984 sequel V: The Final Battle, and the TV series V: The Series.

Other roles include the 1982 film If You Could See What I Hear (where he portrayed blind musician Tom Sullivan), Body Chemistry, Something for Joey (as football star John Cappelletti), Watchers II, High Desert Kill, The Fighter, Go Tell the Spartans and Dead Space, as well as General Klaus Von Kraut in A Man Called Sarge.

Singer voiced the character of Man-Bat on Batman: The Animated Series. He has guest-starred on television series, such as Barnaby Jones, where he played in the episode titled "Trap Play" (01/07/1975). This is a role he played alongside Nick Nolte in the earlier years. He also appeared in another episode of Barnaby Jones, titled "Price of Terror" (10/10/75). He also starred as Matt Cantrell in season nine ("the dream season") of Dallas; The Twilight Zone; The Hitchhiker; Simon & Simon; Murder, She Wrote; The Young and the Restless; The Ray Bradbury Theatre; and Highlander: The Series.

Singer is active in theatre and played Petruchio in the American Conservatory Theater (A.C.T.) production of Shakespeare's Taming of the Shrew, as well as Christian in Cyrano de Bergerac. Both Taming of the Shrew and Cyrano were filmed.

Singer appeared in the last episode of season 2 of the new version of V, airing on March 15, 2011; however, instead of reprising his role of Mike Donovan, he plays a new character called Lars Tremont. He was in a recurring role as General Matthew Shrieve on The CW television series Arrow's third season.

== Filmography ==
=== Film ===
Year	Title	Role	Notes
1978	Go Tell The Spartans	Captain Al Olivetti	
1982	If You Could See What I Hear	Tom Sullivan	
1982	The Beastmaster	Dar	
1988	Born to Race	Kenny Landruff	
1990	A Man Called Sarge	Colonel Klaus Von Kraut	
1990	Body Chemistry	Tom Redding	
1990	In the Cold of the Night	Ken Strom	
1990	Dan Turner, Hollywood Detective	Detective Dan Turner	
1990	Watchers II	Paul Ferguson	
1991	Dead Space	Commander Steve Krieger	
1991	Beastmaster 2: Through the Portal of Time	Dar	
1991	Beyond the Silhouette	Jonathan Sullivan	Released in the U.S. as Ultimate Desires
1992	The Berlin Conspiracy	Harry Spangler	
1992	Sweet Justice	Steve Colton	
1994	Silk Degrees	Baker	
1995	Victim of Desire	Peter Starky	
1995	Savate	Ziegfeld Von Trotta	
1995	Droid Gunner	Jack Ford	
1996	Street Corner Justice	Mike Justus	
1997	Lancelot: Guardian of Time	Lancelot	
2001	L.A.P.D.: To Protect and to Serve	Sam Steele	
2002	Angel Blade	Dr. Martin Gites	
2002	Determination of Death	Reese Williams	
2004	What Lies Above	Curt Seavers	
2008	Eagle Eye	Explosives Developer	
2009	Dragonquest	Maxim	
2011	Life at the Resort	Thomas Warfield	
2013	House Hunting	Charlie Hays	
2013	The Last Letter	Mr. Haynes	
2014	The Palmer Supremacy	Roger Towne	
2024	Agent Recon	Colonel Green	

=== Television ===
Year	Title	Role	Notes
1973	Columbo	Young TV Doctor	Episode: "Double Shock"
1974	Cyrano de Bergerac	Christian de Neuvillette	Television film
1974	Planet of the Apes	Dalton	Episode: "The Gladiators"
1974	Nakia	Reed	Episode: "No Place to Hide"
1974	Hawaii Five-O	Randy	Episode: "Bomb, Bomb, Who's Got the Bomb?"
1974	Things in Their Season	Andy Gerlach	Television film
1975	Barnaby Jones	Feather Tanner	Episode: "Trap Play"
1975	Journey from Darkness	David Hartman	Television film
1975	Hawaii Five-O	Jeff Heywood	Episode: "Target? The Lady"
1975	Barnaby Jones	Tally Morgan	Episode: "The Price of Terror"
1976	The Rookies	Blair Winfield	Episode: "Journey to Oblivion"
1976	Jigsaw John	Wade Bedell	4 episodes
1976	The Taming of the Shrew	Petruchio	Television film
1977	Something for Joey	John Cappelletti	Television film
1977	The Feather and Father Gang	Tim Donahue	Episode: "Never Con a Killer"
1977	79 Park Avenue	Ross Savitch	Miniseries, 2 episodes
1978	What Really Happened to the Class of '65?		Episode: "Class Underachiever"
1978	Sergeant Matlovich vs. the U.S. Air Force	Jason Cole	Television film
1978	Visions		Episode: "Escape"
1979	Roots: The Next Generations	Andy Warner	Miniseries, 4 episodes
1979	The Two Worlds of Jennie Logan	David Reynolds	Television film
1980	The Contender	Johnny Captor	Miniseries, 5 episodes
1981	For Ladies Only	Stan Novak	Television film
1982	Paper Dolls	Wesley Miles	Television film
1982	CHiPs	Spectator	Episode: "Something Special"
1983	V	Mike Donovan	Miniseries, 2 episodes
1984	Her Life as a Man	Mark Rogers	Television film
1984	V: The Final Battle	Mike Donovan	Miniseries, 3 episodes
1984	The Love Boat	John Neary	2 episodes
1984-1985	V	Mike Donovan	19 episodes
1985	The Greatest Adventure: Stories from the Bible	Adam	Voice, episode: "The Creation"
1986	Dallas	Matt Cantrell	12 episodes
1987	Hotel	Lieutenant Commander Tom Hardison	Episode: "Past Tense"
1987	Shades of Love: Indigo Autumn	Bruce	Television film
1988	The Twilight Zone	Ed Hamler/Monty Hanks	Episode: "Extra Innings"
1988	Simon & Simon	Ray McGuinness	Episode: "Love Song of Abigail Marsh"
1989	Murder, She Wrote	Rick Barton	Episode: "The Search for Peter Kerry"
1989	The Hitchhiker	Robert Lewis	Episode: "Code Liz"
1989	High Desert Kill	Brad Mueller	Television film
1991	Deadly Game	Jake Kellogg	Television film
1992	The Ray Bradbury Theater	Commander Trask	Episode: "The Long Rain"
1992	Batman: The Animated Series	Dr. Kirk Langstrom	Voice, 3 episodes
1992	Highlander: The Series	Caleb Cole	Episode: "Mountain Men"
1993	The Sea Wolf	Johnson	Television film
1993	The Adventures of the Black Stallion		Episode: "Legends Never Die"
1994	Sirens	Bruce Weber	2 episodes
1996	Beastmaster III: The Eye of Braxus	Dar	Television film
1996	The Real Adventures of Jonny Quest	Montague, Mitchell Stramm	Voice, 2 episodes
1998	Honey, I Shrunk the Kids: The TV Show	Bob	Voice, episode: "Honey, It's Doomsday"
1999	The Young and the Restless	Chet	12 episodes
2001-2002	Beastmaster	Dartanus	6 episodes
2005	Duck Dodgers	Kirk Manlord	Voice, episode: "Bonafide Heroes"
2006	Lesser Evil	Captain Varney	Television film
2010	The Republic	Frank Alden	Television film
2011	Criminal Minds: Suspect Behavior	Kenneth Richards	Episode: "See No Evil"
2011	V	Lars Tremont	Episode: "Mother's Day"
2015	Arrow	General Matthew Shrieve	5 episodes
2016	Beauty & the Beast	Peter Braxton	4 episodes
2020	AJ and the Queen	Bob	Episode: "Columbus"
2026	The Varnell Hill Show	David Michaelson	2 episodes
