= High Desert Kill =

1989 film

High Desert Kill is 1989 low-budget Made-for-TV movie directed by Harry Falk. It starred Marc Singer, Chuck Connors, Anthony Geary and Vaughn Armstrong as an alien apparition. It aired on the USA Network in 1989 and was later given an extremely limited theatrical release in some overseas markets.

== Plot summary ==
Jim, Ray, Brad and Paul leave town for their yearly hunting trip in the woods, but they soon realize that there isn't a single animal to be found, and the forest has fallen quiet. Two female campers they meet mysteriously disappear the next day, leaving their equipment behind. Soon, the hunters start to behave strangely, as an alien power is using them for cruel psychological experiments.

== Video availability ==
The film received a US VHS release by MCA Universal Home Video. Kino Lorber and Code Red announced a US Blu-ray release for sometime in 2021/22.

== Reception ==
A review by Entertainment Weekly noted that the "plot suggests Deliverance and Predator poured into a blender, but as long as it keeps you wondering what on earth is going on, it’s perversely intriguing. But it spoils the fun by telling you what’s going on and then becomes just another goofy monster movie."

Film critic Joe Kane wrote that the film "boasts a potentially fun premise that's largely done in by poor, often boring execution."

Leonard Maltin rated it above average and described it as an "offbeat sci-fi thriller involving four hunters in the New Mexico badlands whose bodies and minds are invaded by a supernatural force."
