= Deadly Dreams =

1988 film by Kristine Peterson

- Video poster
- Directed by: Kristine Peterson
- Written by: Thom Babbes
- Produced by: Matt Leipzig
- Starring: Mitchell Anderson; Juliette Cummins; Xander Berkeley; Thom Babbes
- Cinematography: Zorran Hochstatter
- Edited by: Bernard F. Caputo
- Music by: Todd Boekelheide
- Distributed by: Virgin Vision
- Release date: October 26, 1988
- Running time: 79 minutes
- Country: United States

Deadly Dreams is a 1988 American psychological horror film directed by Kristine Peterson, and starring Mitchell Anderson, Juliette Cummins, and Xander Berkeley.

== Plot ==
Alex Torme is haunted by the brutal murder of his parents on Christmas Eve when he was a child: His wealthy father's business associate, Norman Perkins, shot them to death over a financial dispute, and taunted Alex and his older brother, Jack, while donning a mask made from the face pelt of a fox. Perkins then turned the gun on himself, committing suicide. Alex suffers recurring nightmares in which he is stalked by Perkins.

An aspiring writer, Alex is pressured by Jack, who has taken over the family's business, to join him. Alex begins dating Maggie Kallir, a young dance student from New York City. Meanwhile, Alex discovers a fox mask in his friend Danny's house, and becomes convinced that Danny, a comical prankster, has been posing as Perkins to torment him, causing Alex to end their friendship. Maggie accompanies Alex to his parents' estate, where Jack resides, for dinner. Jack questions Maggie about her past, and catches her in a lie about working for a dance company in New York that does not exist. He proceeds to expose her, accusing her of being a gold digger only after Alex's inheritance.

Later, Alex finds a butchered deer in his bathtub, but it disappears when he reports the incident to authorities. Maggie and Danny attempt to calm him, but he accuses Danny of planting the dead animal there, gaslighting him. Some time later, Maggie visits Jack, and the two have passionate sex. It is revealed that the two have been conspiring together in an attempt to trigger a psychological breakdown in Alex.

Meanwhile, Danny, who is suspicious of Maggie, breaks into her apartment and uncovers a photo album containing pictures of her with Jack, along with newspaper clippings about Alex and Jack's parents' murder. Upon her return, Danny confronts Maggie, but she forces him out. Maggie and Jack proceed to murder Danny with a rifle, staging it as a suicide.

Maggie lures Alex to his family's remote cabin on his birthday, where he is met by a drunken Jack. Jack confesses his resentment toward Alex over his lack of dedication to the family business, and the fact that Alex is due to inherit a large portion of it despite his lack of involvement. A fox-masked hitman hired by Jack chases Alex through the woods, shooting him in the shoulder. He collapses on a road, and a car driven by Maggie approaches. The assailant proceeds to throw Alex on the hood of the car and slit his throat as Maggie looks on coldly.

Several days later, during Christmas, Jack suffers a nightmare in which Alex, lying dead in the morgue, awakens and attacks him. Maggie goes to get Jack a drink to calm him. Meanwhile, an unseen assailant enters the bedroom and murders Jack. While Jack is being murdered, Maggie phones her mother, and leaves a message saying that her father—who was in fact Norman Perkins—can finally "rest in peace."

== Cast ==
- Mitchell Anderson as Alex Torme
  - Timothy Austin as Young Alex Torme
- Juliette Cummins as Maggie Kallir
- Xander Berkeley as Jack Torme
- Thom Babbes as Danny
- Duane Whitaker as Norman Perkins
- Geoffrey Forward as Mr. Torme
- Gyl Roland as Mrs. Torme
- Troy Evans as Sheriff
- Stacey Travis as The Librarian
- Gray Ainsworth as The Hunter
- Michael Leopard as Sportsman #1
- Beach Dickerson as Sportsman #2
- Jaime Kaplan as Boy With Toy Gun
- Lynn Philip Seibel as The Coroner
- Al Guarino as The Bartender

== Release ==
Deadly Dreams was released direct-to-video. An article in Fangoria stated that the film was available on home video by the Virgin Vision label as early as October 1988. It was released for the first time on DVD by Code Red on September 19, 2017.

== Reception ==
TV Guide gave the film a positive review: "This surprising and refreshingly taut low-budget horror film offers what most run-of-the-mill slasher films don't: a good story with a surprise ending".

Alexandra Heller-Nicholas of Fangoria wrote: "Deadly Dreams is proudly an '80s slasher film – this is obviously no Ken Loach manifesto about class injustice – but through its emphasis on Norman Perkins’ lower class status and the fact that it is his spectre that is the central ominous force in the film is no coincidence."
