= Robin Riker =

American actress and author (born 1952)

- Born: October 2, 1952 (age 73)
- Occupations: Actress; author
- Years active: 1976–present
- Known for: Brothers; Alligator; The Bold and the Beautiful; Get a Life; The Gregory Hines Show; Thunder Alley
- Spouse: William Hasley (divorced)

Robin Riker (born October 2, 1952) is an American actress and author. She made her big screen debut in the 1980 horror film Alligator and later went to star in the Showtime comedy series Brothers (1984–1989).

Riker had starring roles in a number of sitcoms during 1990s, include Get a Life (1990–92), Shaky Ground (1992–93), Thunder Alley (1994–95), and The Gregory Hines Show (1997–98). From 2008 to 2010 she played the role of Beth Logan in the CBS daytime soap opera The Bold and the Beautiful.

== Early life ==
Riker began her acting journey in theater at the age of two.

== Career ==
Riker began her career appearing in episodes of M*A*S*H, Fantasy Island, The Fall Guy, The Rockford Files, The A-Team and Airwolf. She made her film debut appearing as a female lead in the 1980 horror film Alligator. From 1984 to 1987, she starred as Kelly Hall in the Showtime comedy series Brothers, leaving at the end of the show's fourth season. She also appeared in films Stepmonster (1993), A Reason to Believe (1995), Brink! (1998) and Don't Look Under the Bed (1999).

During 1990s, Riker had starring roles in a number of sitcoms, include Get a Life (1990–92), Shaky Ground (1992–93), Thunder Alley (1994–95), and The Gregory Hines Show (1997–98). She guest starred on Murder, She Wrote, Sabrina the Teenage Witch, Buffy the Vampire Slayer, Malcolm in the Middle, Reba, NCIS, Boston Legal, Bones, Justified and The Glades.

In 2000, Riker began appearing in a daytime soap opera Days of Our Lives. In 2005, she was named by KCL Productions to dress up as Princess Peach mascot to do Mario Superstar Baseball commercial. After, she signed a contract for the CBS soap opera The Bold and the Beautiful in the recast role of Beth Logan. Her first appearance was on June 18, 2008. Riker continues to work in stages from Los Angeles to New York and to receive nominations for her work in the theatre. In 2013, she provided the voice and motion capture for Lilith in the video game DmC: Devil May Cry. In May 2016, Riker was hired to portray the recurring role of Naomi Dreyfus on the ABC daytime soap opera General Hospital. She played the role from June 3, 2016, to September 21, 2016.

== Filmography ==
=== Films ===
Year	Title	Role	Notes
1980	Alligator	Dr. Marisa Kendall	
1990	Writer's Block	Magenta	Short film
1990	Without Her Consent	Marcia	Television film
1991	Body Chemistry II: The Voice of a Stranger	Brenda Foster	
1993	Stepmonster	Denise Gore	
1994	In the Heat of Passion II: Unfaithful	Catherine	
1995	A Reason to Believe	Constance	
1995	Dead Badge	Joyce Deitz	
1996	Christmas Every Day	Carolyn Jackson	Television film
1997	The O Show	Mom	Television film
1998	Brink!	Maddie Brinker	Television film
1999	Don't Look Under the Bed	Karen McCausland	Television film
2002	The Stoneman	Dr. Anna Weston	
2005	Gone But Not Forgotten	Nora Sloane / Samantha Reardon	Television film
2006	Read It and Weep	Diana	
2011	Convincing Clooney	Head Honcho	
2012	Save the Date	Aunt Mary	
2012	Divorce Invitation	Lucy Christian	
2012	Holly's Holiday	Carol	
2012	The Famous Joe Project	Carrie	
2013	This Magic Moment	Maryellen Gable	Television film
2016	Saved By Grace	Anne	
2016	The Wedding Party	Kit "The Cougar"	
2018	Hildy & Maude	Hildy	Short film
2018	Killer in a Red Dress	Mary	
2019	Granny's Home	Colleen	Original Title: "Psycho Granny"

=== Television ===
Year	Title	Role	Notes
2016	General Hospital	Naomi Dreyfus	ABC
2015	Austin & Ally	Mrs. Jackson	Episode: "Rejection & Rocket Ships"
2008–2010	The Bold and the Beautiful	Beth Logan	CBS (54 episodes)
2003	Exit 9	Lynne	TV pilot
2000	Days of Our Lives	Bonnie Lockhart	NBC
1999	Sliders	First Lady Mrs. Williams	Episode (5/7): "A Current Affair"
1997–1998	The Gregory Hines Show	Nicole Moran	CBS (20 episodes)
1994–1995	Thunder Alley	Roberta "Bobbi" Turner	ABC (19 episodes)
1992–1993	Shaky Ground	Helen Moody	FOX (17 episodes)
1990–1992	Get a Life	Sharon Potter	FOX (31 episodes)
1989	Empty Nest	Janet Majors	Episode 2x05: "Just You and My Kid"
1984–1987	Brothers	Kelly Hall	Showtime (80 episodes)
1977	M*A*S*H	Nurse Perry	"Fallen Idol" (Season 6, Ep. 2)
1976	Baa Baa Blacksheep	1st Nurse	NBC

==== Episodic – Guest Star ====
Year	Title	Role	Notes
2017	You're The Worst	Faye Cottumaccio	Episodes: "Worldstar!" and "Dad-Not-Dad"
2014	Anger Management	Terri	Episode: "Charlie Rolls the Dice in Vegas"
2013	Justified	Deborah Jane	Episode: "Money Trap"
2012–2013	DeVanity	Angelica Roth	www.devanity.com (3 episodes)
2012	Last Man Standing	Wanda	Episode: "Ed's Twice Ex-Wife"
2012	Switched at Birth	Michelle Natterson	Episode: "Street Noises Invade the House"
2011	Hung	Actress	Episode: "A Monkey Named Simian or Frances is Not a Fan"
2011	Svetlana	Liam's Mom	Episode: "Mom! Dad!"
2010–2013	The Glades	Jody Cargill	A&E (3 episodes)
2010	Bones	Nadia Blake	Episode: "The Shallow in the Deep "
2007	Big Love	Meredith Paulson	Episode: "The Happiest Girl"
2006	Boston Legal	Candy Springtime	ABC (2 episodes)
2006	The Closer	Barbara	Episode: "The Other Woman"
2006	Twenty Good Years	Helen	Episode: "Sorry, Wrong Ship"
2005	NCIS	Saleena Lockhart	Episode: "Black Water"
2004	Cold Case	Doreen Denova	Episode: "Disco Inferno"
2004	Crossing Jordan	Frances Pritchard	Episode: "Til Death Do Us Part"
2003	American Dreams	Mrs. Jensen	Episode: "Ticket to Ride"
2002–2003	Reba	Sue Montgomery	The WB (2 episodes)
2002	One on One	Connie	Episode: "Adventures in Double Dating"
2002	What I Like About You	Eileen	Episode: "Spa Day"
2001	Family Law	Actress	Episode: "Sex, Lies, and Internet"
2001	Dead Last	Bunny Cahill	Episode: "Jane's Exit"
2001	Six Feet Under	Chloe Yorkin	Episode: "Crossroads" (uncredited)
2001	Two guys, a Girl and a Pizza Place	Mrs. Brewer	Episode: "Make Mine Tea"
2001	Malcolm in the Middle	Tina	Episode: "New Neighbors"
1998	Clueless	Bev	Episode: "Father's Keeper"
1997	Buffy the Vampire Slayer	Catherine Madison	Episode: "Witch"
1996	Sabrina, the Teenage Witch	Marigold Wiccan	Episode: "A Halloween Story"
1996	Murder, She Wrote	Colleen Sellers	Episode: "Death by Demographics"
1994	Diagnosis: Murder	Claire	Episode: "Many Happy Returns"
1989	Murder, She Wrote	Connie Kowalski	Episode: "Dead Letter" (as Robin Riker-Hasley)
1989	Highway to Heaven	Peg Bennett	Episode: "The Silent Bell"
1985	Misfits of Science	Sarah	Episode: "Grand Theft Bunny"
1985	Highway to Heaven	Sherri Johnson	(TV Series), 2 episodes: "A Song for Jason: Part 1" and "A Song for Jason: Part 2"
1984	Airwolf	Dr. Karen Hansen	Episode: "Moffett's Ghost"
1983	The Fall Guy	Leslie Tyler	Episode: "Wheels" (S03E12)
1983	The A-Team	Amanda Huston	Episode: Water, Water Everywhere"
	Pearl		CBS

== Theatre ==
- Ladies' Room (1988; Tiffany Theatre Los Angeles)
- The Kiss at City Hall (2000; Pasadena Playhouse; Victim Dramalogue Award Winner Stage Coach Theatre
- Sex, Sex, Sex, Sex, Sex and Sex (2005; The Matrix Theatre)
- I Remember You (2006; Falcon Theatre)
- Welcome to the Woods (2009; off-Broadway)
- Cannibals (2010) Zephyr Theatre
- Les Liaisons Dangereuses (The Blank Theatre Company)
- All My Sons (Geffen Playhouse)
- Pied a Terre Off Broadway
