= Shaky Ground =

Television series

- Genre: Sitcom
- Created by: Bob Keyes; Chip Keyes; Doug Keyes
- Directed by: Max Tash; Art Wolff; Scott Baio; Shelley Jensen
- Starring: Matt Frewer; Robin Riker; Jennifer Love Hewitt; Matthew Brooks; Bradley Pierce; Harold Sylvester
- Opening theme: "Shakey Ground" performed by Phoebe Snow
- Composer: Bruce Miller
- Country of origin: United States
- Original language: English
- No. of seasons: 1
- No. of episodes: 17

Production
- Executive producers: Bob Keyes; Chip Keyes; Doug Keyes
- Running time: 30 minutes
- Production companies: Keyes Brothers Productions; Lorimar Television

Original release
- Network: Fox
- Release: December 27, 1992 – May 23, 1993

Shaky Ground is an American sitcom, created by Bob Keyes, Chip Keyes, and Doug Keyes, which starred Matt Frewer as Bob Moody, a hapless but supportive and caring father. Robin Riker played his wife and Matthew Brooks, Jennifer Love Hewitt, and Bradley Pierce played their children. The show aired on Fox from December 27, 1992 to May 23, 1993.

== Theme ==
Bob Moody was mid-life, mid-career, middle-management and middle-class. He worked as a quality-control inspector for United General Technologies. He loved his family and worked hard to support them, but in ways was struggling with adulthood as well. Episodes often focused on Bob's thwarted ambitions at work, or the fact that he was not a traditional husband and father at home. Bob managed to get by as a result of finding the confidence to accept himself. Some episodes were surrealistic in nature, such as Bob trying an experimental hair-restoration product that slowly turned him into a werewolf. In another episode he takes up "Dance Fu", a combination of the martial arts and jazz dancing, to protect his family's right to go to a restaurant after a bully from work threatens him. Other episodes were more down to earth. In one Bob stages a sit-in in his younger son's treehouse in order to protest oppressive zoning laws which demand the treehouse be demolished. In another episode his daughter asks him to stay in the kitchen and not embarrass her at her first party, but when it flops, he livens it up with disco music and a game of Twister to everyone's delight and helps his daughter approach a boy she likes. However outlandish the situations became, the series was always grounded in family life.

The series finale had Bob circulating a petition to save the local school music program, ultimately Bob is tackled by Secret Service agents when he tries to get newly-elected President Bill Clinton to sign the petition - in a men's room.

Scheduled alongside primetime broadcasts of Batman: The Animated Series, against powerhouse 60 Minutes, Shaky Ground struggled in its time slot, while retaining a small but devoted cult following. Howard Rosenberg of the Los Angeles Times described the show as "sneaky-funny" in his 1992 review.

== Cast ==
- Matt Frewer as Bob Moody
- Robin Riker as Helen Moody
- Matthew Brooks as Carter Moody
- Jennifer Love Hewitt as Bernadette Moody
- Harold Sylvester as Russell
- Bradley Pierce as Dylan Moody

== Episodes ==
No.	Title	Directed by	Written by	Original release date	Prod. code
1	"Honey, I Shrunk the Paycheck"	Max Tash	Bob Keyes & Chip Keyes & Doug Keyes	December 13, 1992	455101
Bob loses a promotion to a much-younger manager and quits his job, then must break the news to his wife.
2	"Fight Night"	Max Tash	Bob Keyes & Chip Keyes & Doug Keyes	December 20, 1992	455106
Bob has Carter play sick so he can stay home to "nurse" him, but actually he wants to watch the hottest fight of the year and avoid having to attend The Nutcracker with Helen and the in-laws.
3	"The Amazing Chimney Boy"	Max Tash	Kevin Kelton	December 27, 1992	455105
Bob tries to clean the chimney, but when Dylan gets stuck inside, Bob's marriage may go up in smoke.
4	"House Party, Too"	Max Tash	Eric Brand & Robert Kurtz	January 3, 1993	455102
Bob moves his poker game to his house so he can chaperone Bernadette's party, a move sure to embarrass her.
5	"Pet Sematary"	Scott Baio	Shari Hearn	January 10, 1993	455107
Bob's in-laws leave their dog behind when they vacation in Hawaii and when it suddenly dies, Bob could find himself in the doghouse.
6	"The Scarlet Letter"	Scott Baio	Virginia K. Hegge & Christopher Vane	January 17, 1993	455103
Bob and Helen's fifteenth anniversary is clouded when Bernadette finds a love poem from one of Helen's old flames.
7	"Of Human Bonding"	Steve Zuckerman	Tom Devanney	January 24, 1993	455104
After spending long hours at work away from the family, Bob tries to bond with youngest child Dylan.
8	"Asbestos and Costello"	Max Tash	Virginia K. Hegge & Christopher Vane	February 7, 1993	455108
Before their broken furnace can be replaced, the Moodys must contend with the cold reality of costly asbestos removal — and living in a small trailer in their back yard.
9	"Sudden Impact"	Scott Baio	Bob Keyes, Chip Keyes & Doug Keyes	February 14, 1993	455111
After Bob restores a sports car with Russell and Carter's help, Carter takes it out for an unauthorized spin and wrecks it.
10	"Mr. President"	Max Tash	Eric Brand & Robert Kurtz	February 28, 1993	455112
When the school board considers axing Dylan's music classes, Bob takes a stand against budget cuts and starts a petition drive — without much success. When President Clinton visits a local mall, Bob decides his could be the signature that turns his cause around.
11	"The Tree House"	Richard Correll	Stuart Silverman	March 7, 1993	455113
12	"Misery"	Jeff Melman	Kevin Kelton	March 21, 1993	455110
13	"School Daze"	David Trainer	Kevin Kelton	March 28, 1993	455114
14	"Love Thy Neighbor"	Shelley Jensen	Bob Keyes & Tom Devanney	April 18, 1993	455109
15	"Faulty Attraction"	David Trainer	Tom Devanney	May 2, 1993	455115
16	"Toupee or Not Toupee"	Robert Berlinger	Shari Hearn	May 9, 1993	455116
17	"Stayin' Alive"	Robert Berlinger	Eric Cohen	May 23, 1993	455117
