= Stella Stevens =

American actress (1938–2023)

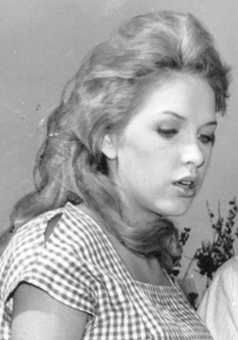
- Stevens in 1961
- Born: Estelle Caro Eggleston; October 1, 1938; Yazoo City, Mississippi, U.S.
- Died: February 17, 2023 (aged 84); Los Angeles, California, U.S.
- Occupation: Actress
- Years active: 1958–2010
- Spouse: Noble Stephens (m. 1954; div. 1957)
- Partner: Bob Kulick (1983–2020; his death)
- Children: Andrew Stevens

Playboy centerfold appearance
- January 1960
- Preceded by: Ellen Stratton
- Succeeded by: Susie Scott

Personal details
- Height: 5 ft 5 in (1.65 m)
- Website: stellastevens.biz

Stella Stevens (born Estelle Caro Eggleston; October 1, 1938 – February 17, 2023) was an American actress and Playboy Playmate. She was named Playmate of the Month for January 1960, she began her career in 1959 in the musical Say One for Me, winning the Golden Globe Award for New Star of the Year – Actress. She then starred in films such as Girls! Girls! Girls! (1962), The Nutty Professor (1963), How to Save a Marriage and Ruin Your Life (1968), The Ballad of Cable Hogue (1970) and The Poseidon Adventure (1972).

Stevens also appeared in several television series, including regular soap opera roles as Lute-Mae Sanders on Flamingo Road (1980-82) and Phyllis Blake on Santa Barbara (1989-90). In addition to her acting work, she appeared in three Playboy Pictorials and was named Playmate of the Month for January 1960.

She was the mother of actor-turned-producer Andrew Stevens and the longtime partner of rock guitarist Bob Kulick.

== Early life ==
Stevens was born in Yazoo City, Mississippi, the only child of Thomas Ellett Eggleston, an insurance salesman, and his wife, Estelle (née Caro) Eggleston, a nurse who was sometimes called by the nickname "Dovey". One of the younger Estelle Eggleston's great-grandfathers was Henry Clay Tyler, an early settler from Boston and a jeweler who gave the Yazoo City courthouse cupola its clock.

When Stevens was four, her parents moved to Memphis, Tennessee; they lived on Carrington Road, near Highland Street, in the city. She attended St. Anne's Catholic School which is on Highland Street and Sacred Heart School on Jefferson Avenue graduating from high school in 1955 at the Memphis Evening School at Memphis Technical High School.

At age 16, she married electrician Noble Herman Stephens, on December 3, 1954, in Holly Springs, Mississippi. They moved to Memphis, where their only child, Herman Andrew Stephens (later Andrew Stevens) was born. The couple divorced in 1957.

While studying at Memphis State University, Stevens became interested in acting and modeling. According to her official biography, "Her schooling in Memphis included a couple of years at Memphis State University, where she was noticed in the school play Bus Stop. The Memphis Press-Scimitar review of that performance in Memphis sparked her career."

== Film career ==
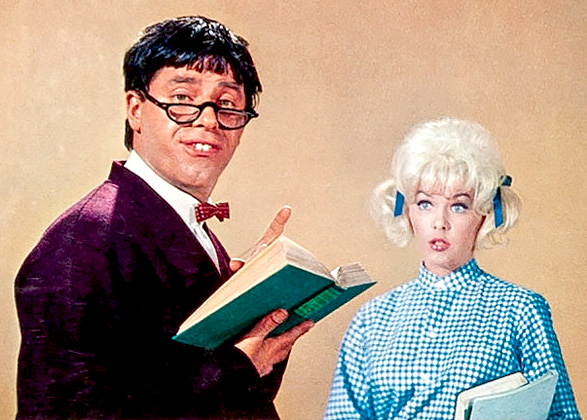
Film publicity picture for The Nutty Professor with Jerry Lewis

Stevens was modelling and working for Goldsmith's department store in Memphis when she signed a contract with 20th Century-Fox in 1958 with Buddy Adler and Dick Powell considering her for a film based on the life of Jean Harlow. She made her film debut in Say One for Me (1959), a modest musical produced by and starring Bing Crosby, appearing in the minor role of a chorus girl. Stevens' contract with Fox was dropped after six months. After winning the role of Appassionata Von Climax in the musical Li'l Abner (1959), she signed a contract with Paramount Pictures (1959-1963). In 1960, she won the Golden Globe Award for New Star of the Year – Actress for her performance in Say One for Me, sharing the distinction with fellow up-and-comers Tuesday Weld, Angie Dickinson, and Janet Munro.

In 1961, she starred opposite Bobby Darin in John Cassavetes' Too Late Blues, and in 1962, she starred opposite Elvis Presley in Girls! Girls! Girls!.

In 1963 she appeared in two successful comedy films: The Nutty Professor starring comedian Jerry Lewis, where she plays his student and love interest Stella Purdy, and in Vincente Minnelli's The Courtship of Eddie's Father, playing the would-be "Miss Montana" beauty queen.

In 1964, she signed a four-year contract with Columbia Pictures. Following appearances in Synanon (1965) and The Secret of My Success (1965), Stevens starred as a sexy but clumsy government agent opposite Dean Martin in the Matt Helm spy spoof The Silencers (1966). Her last film for Columbia was Where Angels Go, Trouble Follows (1968) in which she played a young nun, Sister George, "who understands and sympathizes with the rebellious students" at a girls' Catholic boarding school.

In 1970, Stevens starred opposite Jason Robards in Sam Peckinpah's The Ballad of Cable Hogue, for which she received positive reviews. In his review in The New York Times, Roger Greenspun wrote, "But it is Stella Stevens, at last in a role good enough for her, who most wonderfully sustains and enlightens the action." In 1972, she co-starred with Jim Brown in the blaxploitation movie Slaughter, later in the year costarring in Irwin Allen's hugely successful disaster film The Poseidon Adventure, starring Gene Hackman, Ernest Borgnine, Roddy McDowall, Red Buttons, Arthur O'Connell and Shelley Winters. Stevens played the role of Linda Rogo, the "refreshingly outspoken" ex-prostitute wife of Borgnine's character. In 1986, she appeared in Monster in the Closet.

Although she continued to appear in feature films for the next four decades, Stevens shifted the focus of her career to television series, miniseries, and telemovies.

== Television career ==
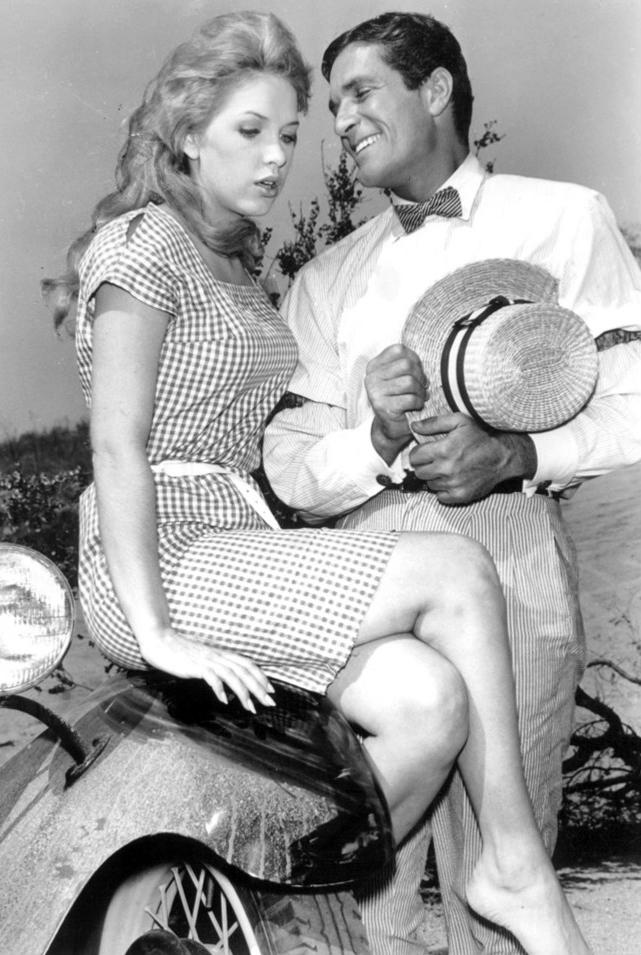
Stella Stevens and Hugh O'Brian, General Electric Theater, 1961

Stevens appeared in several top television series in the 1960s, including Alfred Hitchcock Presents (1960), General Electric Theater (1960, 1961), and Ben Casey (1964). One of her earliest television appearances was in a critically acclaimed 1960 episode of Bonanza, "Silent Thunder"; she played a deaf-mute.

In the early 1970s, she began working regularly on television series, miniseries, and movies. She appeared in episodes of popular series such as Ghost Story (TV series) (1972), Banacek (1973) and Police Story (1975), as well as the pilot films for Wonder Woman (1975), The Love Boat (1977), and Hart to Hart (1979). In 1979, she appeared along with her son Andrew Stevens in The Oregon Trail (1977) episode "Hannah's Girl".

During the 1980s, she continued to work regularly on series including Newhart (1983), The Love Boat (1983), Fantasy Island (1983), Highway to Heaven (1984), Night Court (1984), Murder, She Wrote (1985), Magnum, P.I. (1986), and Father Dowling Mysteries (1987). Stevens appears in 34 episodes of the primetime soap opera Flamingo Road (1981–82), as Lute-Mae Sanders, the former madam of a brothel. During a 1988 interview she commented on her role as a madam in Flamingo Road, saying that, "The truth of the matter is that I've always been type cast, but I don't mind because hookers are among the few roles that require glamorous wardrobes, feathers and jewelry."

From 1989 to 1990, she had a role on Santa Barbara as Phyllis Blake. Her string of appearances on popular television series continued into the 1990s with The Commish (1993), Burke's Law (1994), Highlander: The Series (1995), Silk Stalkings (1996), and General Hospital (1996, 1999). She also appeared in the critically acclaimed miniseries In Cold Blood (1996).

Stevens appeared in several stage productions, including a touring production of an all-female version of Neil Simon's The Odd Couple opposite Sandy Dennis. Stevens played the Oscar Madison character. She directed feature film The Ranch (1989) and produced and directed The American Heroine (1979). In 1999, she co-wrote a novel, Razzle Dazzle, about a Memphis-born singer named Johnny Gault.

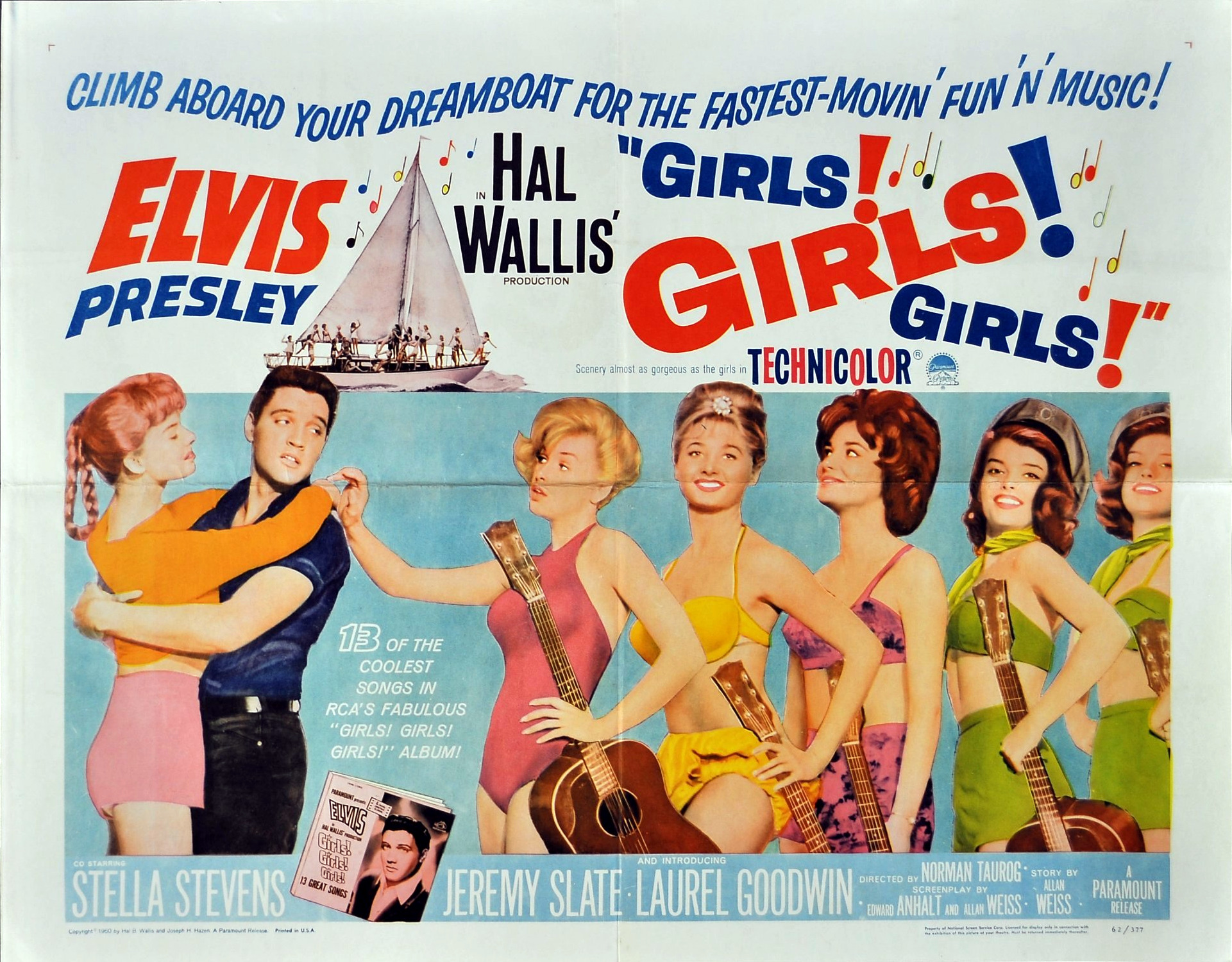
Poster for film Girls, Girls, Girls 1962

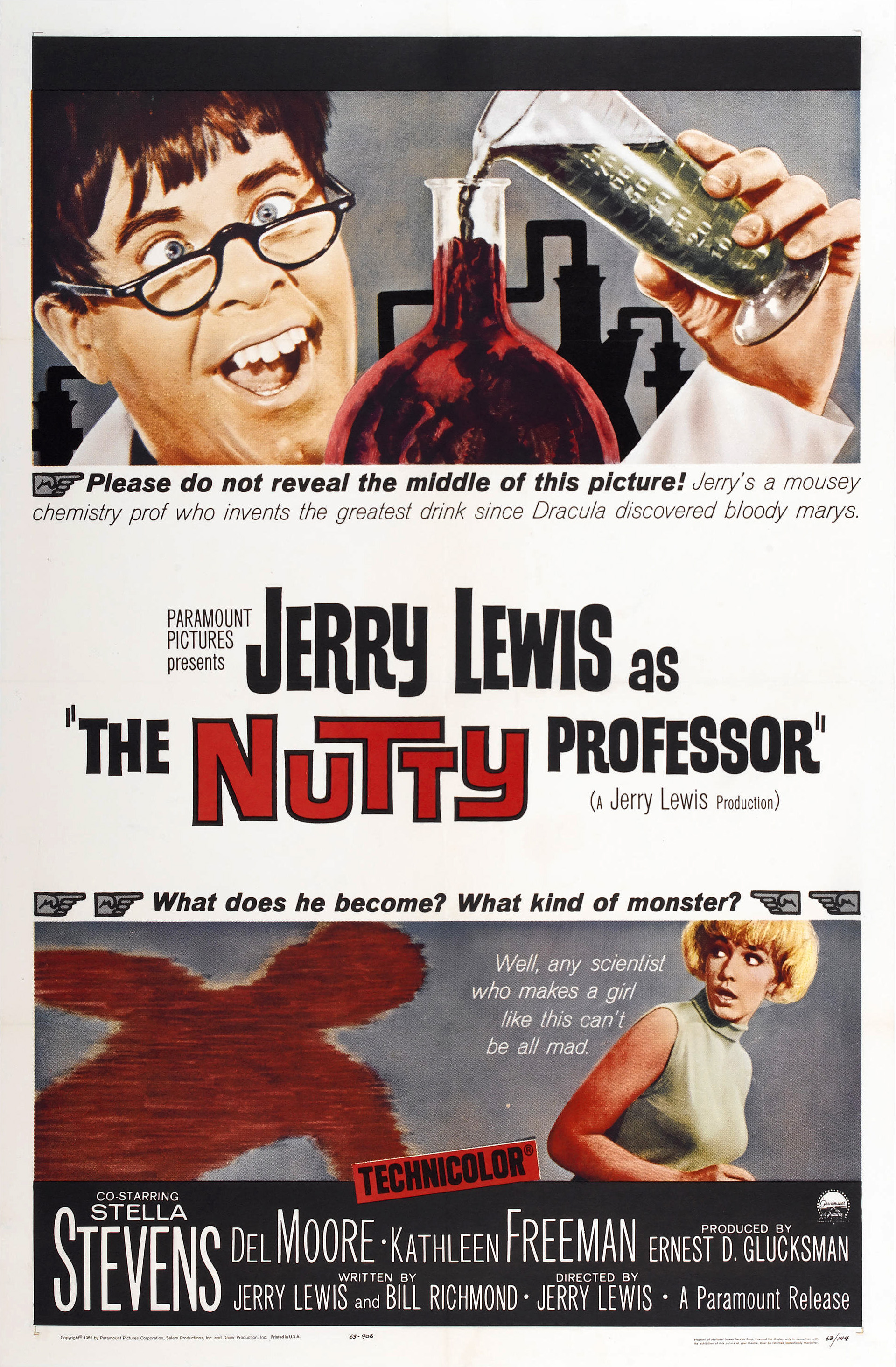
The Nutty Professor movie poster

== Playboy ==
In January 1960, she was Playboy magazine's Playmate of the Month and was also featured in Playboy pictorials in 1965 and 1968. She was included in Playboy's 100 Sexiest Stars of the 20th Century, appearing at number 27. During the 1960s, she was one of the most photographed women in the world.

In 1974, she sued Playboy and Hugh Hefner for $7 million, claiming that they had published pictures of her for 15 years without her consent, some of which depicted her "in a highly degrading and humiliating manner" and that she had lost numerous film roles due to the image portrayed of her by Playboy.

Speaking about her Playboy features, Stevens told The New York Times, "If you've got ten million people seeing you in a layout like that ... and half of them remember the name 'Stella Stevens', they'll buy tickets for your movies."

== Personal life ==
Stevens was married to Noble Herman Stephens from 1954, when she was 16, until their divorce in 1957. Their son Herman Andrew Stephens was born in 1955. Following her divorce she changed the spelling of her last name to 'Stevens' and left her son in the custody of her parents while she sought out a successful acting career. In the years following, she and her former husband engaged in a custody battle for their son, with each party accusing the other of kidnapping, before Stevens finally won full custody.

In late 1976, Stevens purchased a ranch in Methow Valley near Carlton, Washington, on the eastern edge of the Cascade Mountains. She also opened an art gallery and bakery in the nearby small town of Twisp, Washington.

In 1983, Stevens began a long-term relationship with rock guitarist Bob Kulick. A little over a year later, he moved into Stevens' Beverly Hills home. In March 2016, Kulick and Stevens sold her longtime Beverly Hills home, and she moved to a long-term Alzheimer's care facility in Los Angeles. Kulick often visited her there until his death on May 28, 2020.

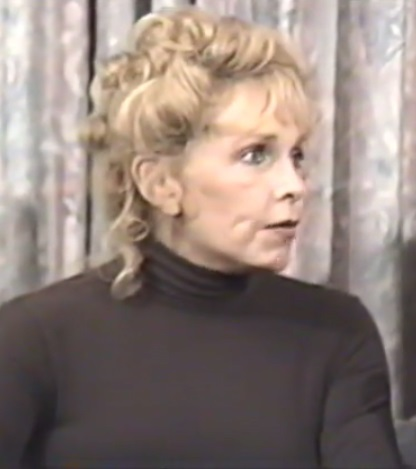
Stevens in 1976

=== Death ===
Stevens died of complications from Alzheimer's disease in Los Angeles on February 17, 2023, at the age of 84.

== Filmography ==
=== Films ===
- Say One for Me (1959) as Chorine
- The Blue Angel (1959) as Chorus Girl (uncredited)
- Li'l Abner (1959) as Appassionata Von Climax
- Man-Trap (1961) as Nina Jameson
- Too Late Blues (1961) as Jess Polanski
- Girls! Girls! Girls! (1962) as Robin Gantner
- The Courtship of Eddie's Father (1963) as Dollye Daly
- The Nutty Professor (1963) as Stella Purdy
- Advance to the Rear (1964) as Martha Lou Williams
- Synanon (1965) as Joaney Adamic
- The Secret of My Success (1966) as Violet Lawson
- The Silencers (1966) as Gail Hendricks
- Rage (1966) as Perla
- How to Save a Marriage and Ruin Your Life (1968) as Carol Corman
- Sol Madrid (1968) as Stacey Woodward
- Where Angels Go, Trouble Follows (1968) as Sister George
- The Mad Room (1969) as Ellen Hardy
- The Ballad of Cable Hogue (1970) as Hildy
- A Town Called Bastard (1971) as Alvira
- Stand Up and Be Counted (1972) as Yvonne Kellerman
- Slaughter (1972) as Ann
- The Poseidon Adventure (1972) as Linda Rogo
- Arnold (1973) as Karen
- Las Vegas Lady (1975) as Lucky
- Cleopatra Jones and the Casino of Gold (1975) as Bianca Javin / Dragon Lady
- Nickelodeon (1976) as Screen Queen
- The Manitou (1978) as Amelia Crusoe
- Wacko (1982) as Mrs. Doctor Graves
- Mister Deathman (1983) as Liz
- Ladies Night (1983) as Shelly
- Chained Heat (1983) as Captain Taylor
- The Longshot (1986) as Nicki Dixon
- Monster in the Closet (1986) as Margo
- Down the Drain (1990) as Sophia
- Mom (1990) as Beverly Hills
- The Terror Within II (1991) as Kara
- Last Call (1991) as Betty
- The Nutt House (1992) as Mrs. Robinson
- Exiled in America (1992) as Sonny Moore
- South Beach (1992) as Nancy
- Little Devils: The Birth (1993) as Mrs. Clara Madison
- Eye of the Stranger (1993) as Doc
- Hard Drive (1994) as Susan
- Point of Seduction: Body Chemistry III (1994, Video) as Frannie Sibley
- Molly & Gina (1994) as Mrs. Sweeny
- Illicit Dreams (1994) as Cicily
- The Granny (1995, Video) as Granny
- Body Chemistry IV: Full Exposure (1995, Video) as Fran Sibley
- Star Hunter (1995, Video) as Mrs. March
- Virtual Combat (1995, Video) as Mary
- Invisible Mom (1996, Video) as Mrs. Herbert Pringle
- Bikini Hotel (1997) as Gail Regent
- Size 'Em Up (2001) as Stella (short film)
- The Long Ride Home (2003) as Fiona Champyon
- Blessed (2004) as Betty
- Glass Trap (2005) as Joan Highsmith
- Hell to Pay (2005) as Mary Potter
- Popstar (2005) as Henrietta
- Megaconda (2010) as Mary Jane, (final film role)

=== Television ===
- Alfred Hitchcock Presents (1960) (Season 5 Episode 23: "Craig's Will") as Judy
- Johnny Ringo (1960, Episode: "Uncertain Vengeance") as Suzanne Crale
- Hawaiian Eye (1960, Episode: "Kakua Woman") as Carol Judd
- Bonanza (1960, Episode: "Silent Thunder") as Ann 'Annie' Croft
- Riverboat (1960, Episode: "Zigzag") as Lisa Walters
- General Electric Theater (1960, Episode: "The Graduation Dress") as Laura Jericho
- General Electric Theater (1961, Episode: "The Great Alberti") as May Alberti
- Follow the Sun (1961, Episode: "Conspiracy of Silence") as Linda Laurence
- Frontier Circus (1962, Episode: "The Balloon Girl") as Katy Cogswell
- Ben Casey (1964, 5 episodes) as Jane Hancock
- In Broad Daylight (1971, TV Movie) as Elizabeth Chappel
- Ghost Story (1972, Episode: "The Dead We Leave Behind") as Joanna Brent
- Hec Ramsey (1972, Episode: "Hangman's Wages") as Ivy Turnwright
- Climb an Angry Mountain (1972, TV Movie) as Sheila Chilko
- Banacek (1973, Episode: "Ten Thousand Dollars a Page") as Jill Hammond
- Linda (1973, TV Movie) as Linda Reston
- Honky Tonk (1974, TV Movie) as Gold Dust
- The Day the Earth Moved (1974, TV Movie) as Kate Barker
- Police Story (1975, Episode: "The Losing Game") as Margaret Case
- Wonder Woman (1975, TV pilot The New Original Wonder Woman as Marcia
- Kiss Me, Kill Me (1976, TV Movie) as Stella Stafford
- Wanted: The Sundance Woman (1976, TV Movie) as Lola Wilkins
- The Love Boat (1977, TV movie, pilot)
- Charlie Cobb: Nice Night for a Hanging (1977, TV Movie) as Martha McVea
- Murder in Peyton Place (1977, TV Movie) as Stella Chernak
- The Night They Took Miss Beautiful (1977, TV Movie) as Kate Malloy
- The Oregon Trail (1977, Episode: "Hannah's Girl", appears with her son, Andrew Stevens) as Hannah Morgan
- The Eddie Capra Mysteries (1978, Pilot: "Nightmare at Pendragon Castle") as Gwynneth Nukem
- The Jordan Chance (1978, TV Movie) as Verna Stewart
- Cruise Into Terror (1978, TV Movie) as Marilyn Magnesun
- Friendships, Secrets and Lies (1979, TV Movie) as Edyth
- Hart to Hart (1979, Episode: "Express to Terror") as Dr. Fleming
- The French Atlantic Affair (1979), miniseries
- Make Me an Offer (1980, TV Movie) as Deidre Price
- Flamingo Road (1980–1982, 34 episodes) as Lute-Mae Sanders
- Children of Divorce (1980, TV Movie) as Sherry Malik
- Twirl (1981, TV Movie) as Carolyn Moore
- Matt Houston (1983, Episode: "Whose Party Is It Anyway?") as Clover McKenna
- The Love Boat (1983, 3 episodes) as Toni Cooper / Kathy Costello / Leonara Klopman
- Women of San Quentin (1983, TV Movie) as Lieutenant Janet Alexander
- Newhart (1983, 2 episodes) as Erica Chase
- Fantasy Island (1983, 2 episodes) as Marion Sommers / Maatira
- Amazons (1984, TV Movie) as Kathryn Lundquist
- No Man's Land (1984, TV Movie) as Nellie Wilder
- Hotel (1984, Episode: "Flesh and Blood") as Rita DeLaine
- Highway to Heaven (1984, Episode: "Help Wanted: Angel") as Stella
- Night Court (1984, Episode: "Harry and the Madam") as Irene Danbury
- Murder, She Wrote (1985, Episode: "Funeral at Fifty-Mile") as Sally Mestin
- A Masterpiece of Murder (1986, TV Movie) as Della Vance / Deb Potts
- Magnum, P.I. (1986, Episode: "Find Me a Rainbow") as Loretta "Lolly" Zachary van der Post
- The History of White People in America: Volume II (1986, TV Movie)
- Tales from the Hollywood Hills: Natica Jackson (1987, TV Movie) as Mimi Carteret
- Tales from the Hollywood Hills: A Table at Ciro's (1987, TV Movie) as Mimi Carteret
- Father Dowling Mysteries (1987, "Fatal Confession") as Katherine 'Kate' St. Urban
- Man Against the Mob (1988, TV Movie) as Joey Day
- Adventures Beyond Belief (1988 TV series) as Mrs. Loretta Kemble
- Alfred Hitchcock Presents (1988, Episode: "Twist") as Georgia Brooks
- Jake Spanner, Private Eye (1989, TV Movie) as Sandra Summers
- Santa Barbara (1989–1990, 66 episodes) as Phyllis Blake
- Dream On (1990, Episode: "Over Your Dead Body") as Lyla Murphy
- In the Heat of the Night (1991, Episode: "A Woman Much Admired") as Georgia Farren
- Dangerous Curves (1992, Episode: "In the Name of Love") as Muffy Fuller
- The Commish (1993, Episode: "Eastbridge Boulevard") as Donna DeVries
- Burke's Law (1994, Episode: "Who Killed the Romance?") as Candice Collier
- Attack of the 5 Ft. 2 In. Women (1994, TV Movie) as Lawanda
- Highlander: The Series (1995, Episode: "Vendetta") as Margaret Lang
- Dave's World (1995, Episode: "The Mommies") as Dave's Mother
- Subliminal Seduction (1996, TV Movie) as Mrs. Beecham
- Renegade (1996, Episode: "Love Hurts") as Amanda Sixkiller
- Arli$$ (1996, Episode: "What About the Fans?") as Flora Lansing
- Silk Stalkings (1996, Episode: "When She Was Bad") as Mrs. Morton
- In Cold Blood (1996, 2 episodes) as Hotel Keeper
- General Hospital (1996-1999)
- The Dukes of Hazzard: Reunion! (1997, TV Movie) as Josephine 'Mama Jo' Max
- Nash Bridges (1997, Episode: "Deliverance") as Suzie Dupree
- The Christmas List (1997, TV Movie) as Natalie Parris
- Viper (1998, Episode: "The Getaway") as Lorraine
- By Dawn's Early Light (2001, TV Movie) as Eli
- Strip Mall (2001, 5 episodes) as Doreen Krudup
- Twenty Good Years (2006, Episode: "The Crying Game") as Martha

=== Video game ===
- Phantasmagoria (1995)

=== As director ===
- The American Heroine (1979)
- The Ranch (1989)

== See also ==
- List of people in Playboy 1960–1969

Stella Stevens	Susie Scott	Sally Sarell	Linda Gamble	Ginger Young	Delores Wells
Teddi Smith	Elaine Paul	Ann Davis	Kathy Douglas	Joni Mattis	Carol Eden
