= Shari Shattuck =

American actress and author (born 1960)

- Born: November 18, 1960 (age 66); Atlanta, Georgia, U.S.
- Occupations: Actress, Writer
- Years active: 1982-present
- Spouse(s): Joseph Paul Stachura (2009–present); Ronn Moss (1990–2002) (divorced) 2 children Ford Smith (?-?) (divorced)
- Website: http://www.sharishattuck.com

Shari Shattuck (born November 18, 1960) is an American actress and author.

Shattuck was born in Atlanta, Georgia. She has appeared in hundreds of commercials, TV, film, and stage productions. Some roles include Dallas, Life Goes On, On Deadly Ground as well as multiple Shakespearean roles. She appeared in both nighttime and daytime soaps, sitcoms, mini-series and starred in multiple films. As a model, she appeared on the cover of Playboy in April 1980, and in numerous other magazines. In 1982, while working as a model in Atlanta, she was cast in the music video of the .38 Special song "Caught Up in You".

== Personal life ==
Shattuck was married to actor Ronn Moss (with whom she has two daughters — Creason and Calee) from January 1990 to July 2002. She later married Joseph Paul Stachura, the owner and managing artistic director of the Knightsbridge Theatre, The National American Shakespeare Company, as well as the Director of Knightsbridge Theatre Films. The couple has produced two movies together, "Redemption" and "Scream at the Devil."

In addition to acting, Shattuck has written for the stage and directed multiple productions. Her play, In Progress, was produced at the Matrix Theatre.

Shattuck is also a fiction writer who has written four mystery novels featuring Callaway Wilde, a wealthy Los Angeles socialite, the first of which, Loaded, was picked as one of the best of 2003 by Publishers Weekly. Other titles in the Callaway Wilde series are Lethal, Liar, and Legacy. She also wrote a psychic series featuring Greer Sands, Eye of the Beholder and Speak of the Devil and two hardcover literary fiction novels, Invisible Ellen and the sequel, Becoming Ellen.

== Filmography ==
Film
Year	Title	Role	Notes
1982	Portfolio	Elite Model	
1986	The Naked Cage	Michelle	
1987	Number One with a Bullet	Regina	
1987	Tainted	Cathy	
1987	Hot Child in the City	Abby Wagner	
1988	Uninvited	Suzanne	
1988	Desert Warrior	Racela	
1989	Arena	Jade	
1989	A Man of Passion	Teresa	
1989	Mad About You	Renee	
1989	Death Spa	Catherine	
1989	The Spring	Dyanne	
1991	Lower Level	Dawn Simms	(Video)
1991	Immortal Sins	Diana	
1992	Out for Blood	Joanna Montague	
1994	On Deadly Ground	Liles	
1994	Point of Seduction: Body Chemistry III	Dr. Claire Archer	
1994	Dead On	Erin Davenport	
1996	Spy Hard	Stewardess	
2015	Scream at the Devil	Mirium Jones	

Television
Year	Title	Role	Notes
1984	Knight Rider	Ingrid	Episode: "Knight of the Chameleon"
1984–1985	The New Mike Hammer	Gladys / Sandra / Neila	3 episodes
1985	Matt Houston	Mary Nichols	Episode: "Final Vows"
1986	Hardesty House	Brandy	TV movie
1988	Freddy's Nightmares	Lana	Episode: "Saturday Night Special"
1988	Goddess of Love	Debbie	TV movie
1989	Falcon Crest	Celeste	Episode: "Flesh & Blood"
1989	Valerie	Nurse Dawn	Episode: "The Hospital"
1989	1st & Ten	Jenny Brown	Episode: "Gunn and Bullette"
1990	Laker Girls	Libby	TV movie
1990	Head of the Class	Ashley	Episode: "Politics of Love"
1990	Doogie Howser, M.D.	Heather	Episode: "A Woman Too Far"
1991	Dallas	Kit Marlowe	5 episodes
1991	Santa Barbara	Kate	Episode #1.1751
1992	Jake and the Fatman	Donna Miller	Episode: "Last Dance"
1992	Who's the Boss?	Jo-Jo	Episode: "Tony Micelli, This Is Your Life"
1992	Baby Talk	Kaye	Episode: "The Commitment"
1992	Life Goes On	Miss January	Episode: "The Whole Truth"
1992	The Bold and the Beautiful	Heather Thompson	2 episodes
1993	Sisters	Morgan Sheridan / 'Georgie'	Episode: "Moving Pictures"
1993	Shaky Ground	Jill	Episode: "Faulty Attraction"
1994	Fortune Hunter	Christine	Episode: "Sea Trial"
1991–1994	Silk Stalkings	Shana Rose / Leslie Hill / Cheryl Lynn Deveraux	3 episodes
1995	Robin's Hoods	Katherine	Episode: "Deja Vu"
1995	Il Barone	Karin Vanet	TV miniseries
1996	Babylon 5	Julie Musante	Episode: "Voices of Authority"
1996	Hypernauts	Onaree	Episode: "Battle at Vekara"
1997	Diagnosis: Murder	Candy Zarkin	Episode: "Comedy Is Murder"
1996–1999	The Young and the Restless	Ashley Abbott	117 episodes
2000	Whatever	Kate Warner	
