= David Kagen =

American film and television actor (born 1948)

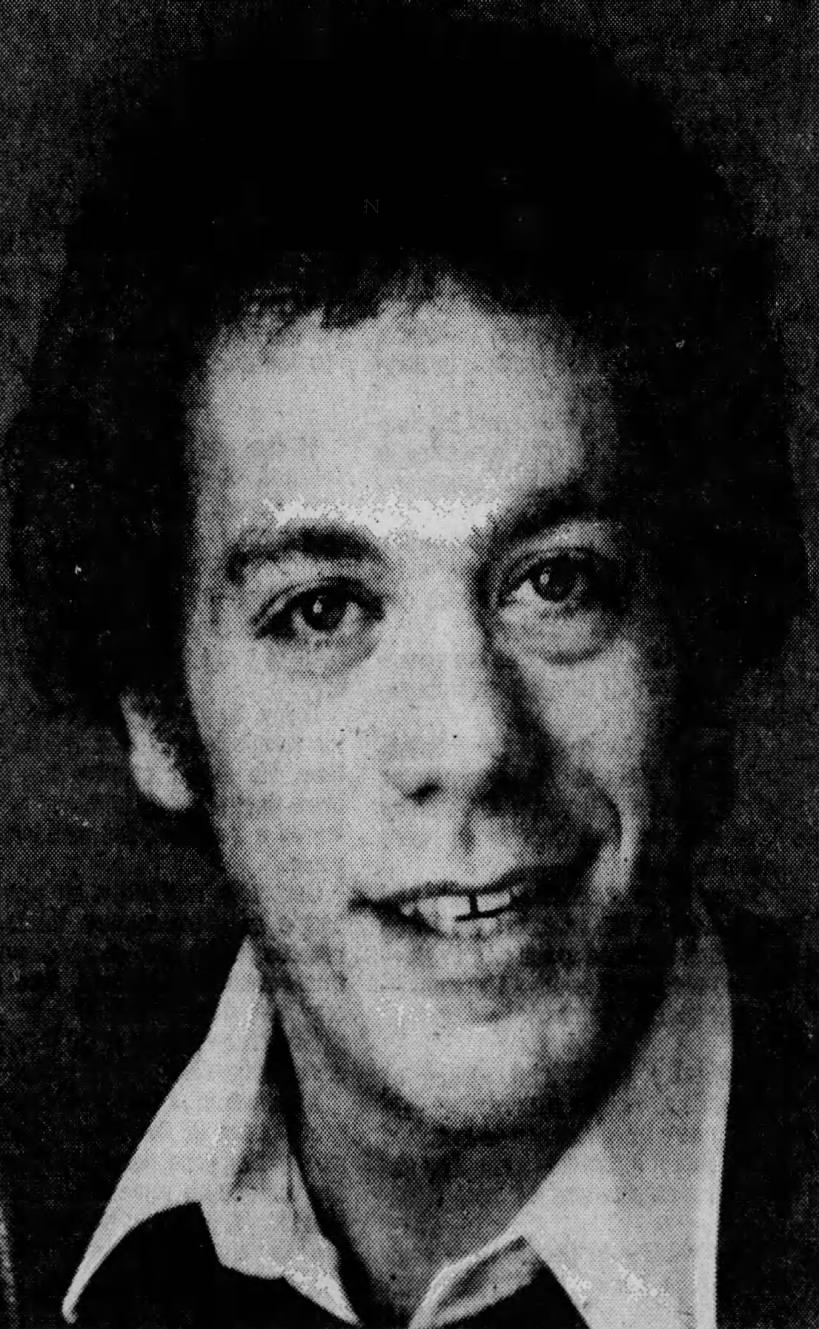
- Kagen in 1978
- Born: David B. Yanowitz; September 27, 1948 (age 77); Somers Point, New Jersey, U.S.
- Education: Carnegie Mellon University
- Occupation: Actor
- Years active: 1978–2015

David B. Yanowitz (born September 27, 1948) is an American film, stage and television actor. He is best known for playing Sheriff Mike Garris in the 1986 film Friday the 13th Part VI: Jason Lives.

== Life and career ==
Kagen was born in Somers Point, New Jersey, the son of Edward and Mae Yanowitz. A resident of Highland Park, New Jersey, he attended New Brunswick High School before transferring to Highland Park High School, from which he graduated in 1966. After graduating, he attended Carnegie Mellon University. He began his stage career in the 1970s, appearing in stage plays such as Love Suicide and Family Business. He then began his screen career in 1980, appearing in the PBS science educational television series 3-2-1 Contact. In 1984, he played as Walter Simpkins in an episode of the NBC detective television series Riptide.

Later in his career, Kagen guest-starred in television programs including House, 21 Jump Street, Hill Street Blues, Star Trek: Enterprise and Diagnosis: Murder, and played the recurring role of Sergeant Sweeny in the ABC soap opera television series General Hospital. He also appeared in films such as Friday the 13th Part VI: Jason Lives (as Sheriff Mike Garris), Conspiracy: The Trial of the Chicago 8 (as John Froines), Hologram Man, Body Chemistry and The Annihilation of Fish.

Kagen retired from acting in 2015, last appearing in the film Intersection.
