= Kristine Peterson =

American film director

Kristine Peterson (born May 8, 1958) is a film director who worked as an assistant director and second unit director on several films as well as directing her own films in the late '80s and '90s. She was a member of the staff at Zoetrope Studios for the filming of Apocalypse Now.

== Filmography ==
- 1984 - The Oasis (second assistant director)
- 1984 - Exterminator 2 (second assistant director)
- 1984 - Gimme an 'F' (second assistant director)
- 1985 - Grunt! The Wrestling Movie (first assistant director)
- 1986 - Chopping Mall (first assistant director)
- 1986 - The Ladies Club (second assistant director)
- 1986 - The Supernaturals (second assistant director)
- 1986 - Reform School Girls (first assistant director)
- 1987 - Maid to Order (first assistant director)
- 1987 - Nightflyers (assistant director)
- 1988 - Deadly Dreams (director)
- 1988 - The Drifter (second unit director)
- 1988 - Beach Balls (second unit director)
- 1989 - Bill & Ted's Excellent Adventure (first assistant director)
- 1989 - Beverly Hills Bodysnatchers (assistant director)
- 1989 - A Nightmare on Elm Street 5: The Dream Child (first assistant director)
- 1990 - Body Chemistry (director)
- 1990 - Tremors (first assistant director: second unit)
- 1990 - Hard Act to Follow (assistant director)
- 1991 - The Search for Signs of Intelligent Life in the Universe (first assistant director)
- 1991 - Lower Level (director)
- 1991 - Critters 3 (director)
- 1994 - The Hard Truth (director)
- 1995 - Redemption: Kickboxer 5 (director)
- 1997 - Slaves to the Underground (director)
