= John Hill (screenwriter) =

American screenwriter and film director

- Born: May 6, 1947; Baton Rouge, Louisiana, United States
- Died: December 12, 2017; Las Vegas, Nevada, United States
- Occupation(s): Television producer, screenwriter
- Years active: 1974–1999
- Spouse: Nancy Gross Hill (1990–2017)
- Children: 2
- Awards: Emmy Award, Outstanding Drama Series, for the NBC-TV series L.A. Law (1991)

John Hill was an American screenwriter and television producer. He was originally from Prairie Village, Kansas.

He got his start in Hollywood when he penned the 1976 TV movie Griffin and Phoenix, starring Peter Falk and Jill Clayburgh. The original title was The fading away of Griffin and Phoenix. ABC thought that too morbid, so he had to change it. In 1980 his film Heartbeeps was released, starring Andy Kaufman and Bernadette Peters. He was also commissioned to novelize both scripts (the first appearing under the TV movie's original title, Griffin Loves Phoenix), exercising his contractual first-refusal right to do the prose adaptations himself; and years later, in personal conversation with a colleague who knew of the books, Hill confessed that he loved working on them because "they taught me how to be a novelist." They remain, however, his only published fiction. In 2007, Griffin and Phoenix would be remade as a feature film, screenplay also by Hill, starring Dermot Mulroney and Amanda Peet.

In 1988, he co-wrote Little Nikita, starring Sidney Poitier and River Phoenix.

He wrote the movie Quigley Down Under in 1975. It was slated to be filmed in 1980, but was postponed when star Steve McQueen became too ill with cancer. Clint Eastwood was approached next, but he turned it down. It was finally filmed and released in 1990, starring Tom Selleck (who had wanted to make the film for several years), Laura San Giacomo and Alan Rickman.

He attained success as a writer for TV's Quantum Leap, and writer/producer of L.A. Law, for which he won an Emmy.

Later in life, Hill taught in the Educational Outreach division of the University of Nevada, Las Vegas (UNLV) in Las Vegas, Nevada.

== Personal life ==
Hill was married twice; his first marriage lasted from 1976 until it ended in divorce in 1991. His two children resulted from this union. He married Nancy Gross in 1995. They were still married at the time of his death.

== Filmography ==
=== Film ===
| Year | Title | Credited as | | | Notes | Ref(s) |
| Year | Title | Director | Producer | Writer | Notes | Ref(s) |
|---|---|---|---|---|---|---|
| 1977 | Close Encounters of the Third Kind | No | No | Yes | Additional writing (uncredited) | |
| 1981 | Heartbeeps | No | Yes | Yes | | |
| 1988 | Little Nikita | No | No | Yes | | |
| 1990 | Quigley Down Under | No | No | Yes | | |
| 2006 | Griffin & Phoenix | No | No | Yes | | |
| 2015 | The Blood Kill Moment | Yes | Yes | Yes | | |

Acting roles

| Year | Title | Role |
|---|---|---|
| 2015 | The Blood Kill Moment | Stonehenge |

=== Television ===
| Year | Title | Credited as | | | Notes | Ref(s) |
| Year | Title | Director | Producer | Writer | Notes | Ref(s) |
|---|---|---|---|---|---|---|
| 1976 | Griffin and Phoenix | No | No | Yes | Television film | |
| 1989 | Quantum Leap | No | Yes | Yes | Wrote episodes "The Right Hand of God - October 24, 1974" and "A Portrait for Troian - February 7, 1971"; Also supervising producer | |
| 1990–1991 | L.A. Law | No | Yes | Yes | Wrote episodes "Armand's Hammer", "New Kidney on the Block" and "Splatoon" | |
| 1992 | Steel Justice | No | No | Yes | Television film | |
| 1994 | Diagnosis Murder | No | No | Yes | Wrote episode "The Restless Remains" | |
| 1994 | Thunder in Paradise | No | No | Yes | | |
