= The One About Matthew Perry =

2026 American documentary television series

- Promotional poster
- Genre: Documentary
- Directed by: Mary Robertson
- Music by: Ian Hultquist
- Country of origin: United States
- Original language: English
- No. of episodes: 3

Production
- Executive producers: Mary Robertson; Lisa Kalikow; Eli Holzman; Aaron Saidman
- Producer: Jessica Call
- Production company: Maxine Productions

Original release
- Network: Netflix
- Release: October 27, 2026

The One About Matthew Perry is a 2026 American documentary television series about the actor Matthew Perry, directed by Mary Robertson. The three-part series was released on Netflix on October 27, 2026, the day before the third anniversary of Perry's death. It is built on interviews with Perry's sister, Mia Perry Bowick, and with friends and colleagues, and it follows his career from early television roles through Friends to his addiction, his work on recovery and his death. None of his Friends co-stars took part.

== Content ==
The title follows the naming pattern of Friends episodes, which began with "The One With" or "The One Where". The series traces Perry's life from his start as a young actor to his years on Friends and his later film and television work, and it uses photographs and home video from the Perry family's archive. Bowick, who became a psychotherapist, speaks about her brother on camera for the first time. She was born when Perry was 14 and describes learning of his first stay in rehabilitation from a tabloid headline, and the day of his death.

Other interviewees include Roger Castillo and David Pressman, friends of Perry since his teens, the former NBC entertainment president Warren Littlefield, the first-season Friends writer Jeff Strauss, the actors Kevin Pollak and Nate Torrence, the director Jonathan Lynn, who made The Whole Nine Yards with Perry, the Fools Rush In producer Doug Draizin, and the Los Angeles Times columnist Mary McNamara. Tim Harrington, who met Perry at a recovery meeting in 2001 and lived in his house for a year, and West Huddleston, who worked with Perry on campaigns for drug courts, describe his efforts for people in recovery. E. Martin Estrada, the former United States attorney who oversaw the prosecutions that followed Perry's death from the effects of ketamine in October 2023, discusses the criminal case.

The Friends cast members, the show's creators and its guest stars appear only in archival footage. The series covers the 2021 reunion special, which people close to Perry saw as evidence of how ill he had become, and Bowick recalls the five co-stars gathering around his casket at his funeral.

== Production and release ==
Netflix announced the series on September 1, 2026, with a release date in October. Robertson, whose earlier work includes Quiet on Set: The Dark Side of Kids TV, directed the series and was an executive producer with Lisa Kalikow, Eli Holzman and Aaron Saidman. Lora Moftah was co-executive producer and Jessica Call produced. The series was made by Maxine Productions, part of Sony Pictures Television. In the announcement, Bowick said it had taken time for her to feel ready to share her memories and to describe her brother "as a whole person, not just as Chandler, and not just as someone who struggled with addiction". A trailer was released on September 29, 2026. All three episodes, each running about an hour, were released on Netflix on October 27, 2026.

== Reception ==
On Rotten Tomatoes, the series holds an approval rating of 100% based on 14 reviews, with an average rating of 7.4 out of 10. Metacritic gave it a score of 71 out of 100.

Daniel Fienberg of The Hollywood Reporter called it "a sincere, generally non-exploitative examination of addiction and celebrity" seen from outside the celebrity bubble, and found Bowick's and the old friends' memories its strongest material. He thought the series would have worked better as a feature of about 100 minutes without the talk-show clips and familiar biography. Zaki Hasan of TheWrap wrote that the series "sometimes feels like a group of people trying to keep a complicated friend from being flattened into a headline" and praised its account of Perry's work for others in recovery. Dominic Patten of Deadline Hollywood was more critical, writing that there was little in the series that viewers had not heard before, that it leaned on Perry's 2022 memoir Friends, Lovers, and the Big Terrible Thing, and that it said little about the circumstances of his death. HuffPost UK summarized the reception as largely positive, with critics singling out the interviews with people who knew Perry before his fame.
