= Griffin and Phoenix =

Griffin and Phoenix may refer to:

- Griffin and Phoenix (1976 film), a television romance film starring Peter Falk and Jill Clayburgh
- Griffin & Phoenix (2006 film), a remake of the above film starring Dermot Mulroney and Amanda Peet
