= The Whole Ten Yards =

- Theatrical release poster
- Directed by: Howard Deutch
- Screenplay by: George Gallo
- Based on: Characters by Mitchell Kapner
- Produced by: David Willis; Allan Kaufman; Elie Samaha; Arnold Rifkin
- Starring: Bruce Willis; Matthew Perry; Amanda Peet; Kevin Pollak; Natasha Henstridge
- Cinematography: Neil Roach
- Edited by: Seth Flaum
- Music by: John Debney
- Production companies: Franchise Pictures; Cheyenne Enterprises; MHF Zweite Academy Film
- Distributed by: Warner Bros. Pictures
- Release date: April 7, 2004
- Running time: 99 minutes
- Country: United States
- Language: English
- Budget: $40 million
- Box office: $26.2 million

The Whole Ten Yards is a 2004 American crime comedy film directed by Howard Deutch and starring Bruce Willis, Matthew Perry, Amanda Peet, Kevin Pollak and Natasha Henstridge. It is a sequel to the 2000 film The Whole Nine Yards. It was based on characters created by Mitchell Kapner, who was the writer of the first film.

Nicholas "Oz" Oseransky, years after helping Jimmy the Tulip retire as a hitman to lead a quiet new life, enlists his help in rescuing his pregnant wife Cynthia, who has been kidnapped by the Hungarian mob. So he and his wife Jill rush to their aid.

The film was released by Warner Bros. Pictures on April 7, 2004, in the United States. Unlike the first film, which was rated R and was a commercial success despite receiving mixed reviews, The Whole Ten Yards received a PG-13 rating and was a critical and commercial failure, grossing $26.2 million against a $40 million budget.

== Plot ==
Thanks to falsified dental records supplied by his former neighbor Nicholas "Oz" Ozeransky, retired hitman Jimmy "The Tulip" Tudeski spends his days compulsively cleaning his house and perfecting his culinary skills with his wife, Jill, a purported assassin who has yet to pull off a "clean" hit – everyone she is hired to kill dies in bizarre accidents before she has a chance. Oz now owns a dental practice in California and has married Jimmy's ex-wife Cynthia and are expecting their first child. However, the relationship is strained by Oz's excessive paranoia as well as Cynthia's secret continued contact with Jimmy.

Their lives are further complicated by the return of Laszlo Gogolak, Jimmy's former mob boss and father figure, whose son Janni was killed by Jimmy and Jill while Laszlo was in prison. Having deduced that Jimmy faked his death, Laszlo abducts Cynthia and threatens Oz to try to learn Jimmy's location, but Oz escapes. Desperate, Oz contacts Jimmy and Jill, but Jimmy refuses to help until Laszlo's men attack as they followed Oz to Jimmy.

Capturing Laszlo's remaining son and Janni's brother Strabovitz, Jimmy offers to trade Strabo for Cynthia. Oz triggers further conflict between Jimmy and Jill when he reveals Jimmy still wears a crucifix from Cynthia. At a bar, Jimmy becomes increasingly depressed at his failure to father a child with Jill, and aggravates Oz by discussing his and Cynthia's past sex life, culminating in Oz and Jimmy becoming so drunk that they wake up in the same bed.

Frustrated by her poor sex life with Jimmy, Jill attempts to seduce Oz, but is interrupted by Jimmy. He knocks out Oz, regaining his passion for Jill and his work, so the two have sex in the bathroom. Re-arming themselves at Oz's, the trio are attacked by an unknown marksman and Strabo is killed in the crossfire. Jimmy insults Jill's capabilities and coldly dismisses Oz; Jill leaves. Oz retreats to his practice where he is met by Jimmy, who apologizes for recent events. They are then chloroformed by Oz's new receptionist Julie, revealed to be the sister of Frankie Figgs, seeking revenge for their role in her brother's death.

Waking up beside Cynthia and Jimmy in Laszlo's apartment, Oz is shocked to learn that the entire situation has been planned by Jimmy and Cynthia to find Laszlo's half of the first dollar he ever stole, which he had torn and divided between Jimmy and Janni as kids. As Laszlo prepares to kill them, Jill arrives, having tied up Strabo's body in her car with explosives to appear alive, and threatens to detonate unless Laszlo releases Oz and Cynthia. Asking to join Laszlo's organization, Jill is ordered to kill Jimmy, who tells her she will not be considered a successful hitter unless she shoots him in the heart.

Jill's car explodes as Laszlo's men try to release Strabo, revealing Jill was in on the plan and shot Jimmy with blanks. Jules is exposed as the shooter who killed Strabo, so Laszlo shoots her. Jimmy, unable to kill the man who raised him, has Jill shoot Laszlo in the foot. Jimmy and Cynthia further reveal that Laszlo's half of the dollar combines with Jimmy's to reveal the number for a $280 million bank account. Jill reveals she is pregnant, and the four drive away as Laszlo is arrested.

== Cast ==
- Bruce Willis as James Stefan "Jimmy The Tulip" Tudeski
- Matthew Perry as Dr. Nicholas "Oz" Oseransky
- Amanda Peet as Jill St. Claire Tudeski
- Kevin Pollak as László Gogolák
- Natasha Henstridge as Cynthia Oseransky
- Frank Collison as Strabonitz "Strabo" Gogolák
- Johnny Messner as Zevo
- Silas Weir Mitchell as Yermo
- Sione Fakaʻosilea as Jevo
- Tasha Smith as Jules "Julie" Figueroa
- Samantha Harris as Laguna (uncredited)

== Production ==
In December 2002, it was announced Franchise Pictures was in production with a sequel to The Whole Nine Yards titled The Whole Ten Yards with both Bruce Willis and Matthew Perry returning. The Whole Ten Yards had initially been intended for release on October 17, 2003, but due to reshoots Warner Bros. Pictures delayed it until the following year.

== Reception ==
=== Box office ===
Unlike the first film, which was a commercial success, The Whole Ten Yards was a box office bomb, bringing in only $16.3 million in North America and $9.8 million internationally. With a worldwide total of $26.2 million, less than a quarter the gross of the original, the film did not recoup its $40 million budget.

=== Critical response ===
Compared to its predecessor, the sequel was widely panned by critics and audiences. On the review aggregator website Rotten Tomatoes, 4% of 118 critics' reviews are positive, with an average rating of 3/10. The website's consensus reads: "A strained, laugh-free sequel, The Whole Ten Yards recycles its predecessor's cast and plot but not its wit or reason for being." Metacritic, which uses a weighted average, assigned the film a score of 24 out of 100, based on 27 critics, indicating "generally unfavorable" reviews. Audiences polled by CinemaScore gave the film an average grade of "C" on an A+ to F scale.

In Matthew Perry's memoir Friends, Lovers, and the Big Terrible Thing, the actor stated that this film's disappointing reception drastically curtailed his film career, writing: "That was the moment Hollywood decided to no longer invite Mr. Perry to be in movies”. He sought more dramatic roles afterward.
