= Amanda Peet =

American actress (born 1972)

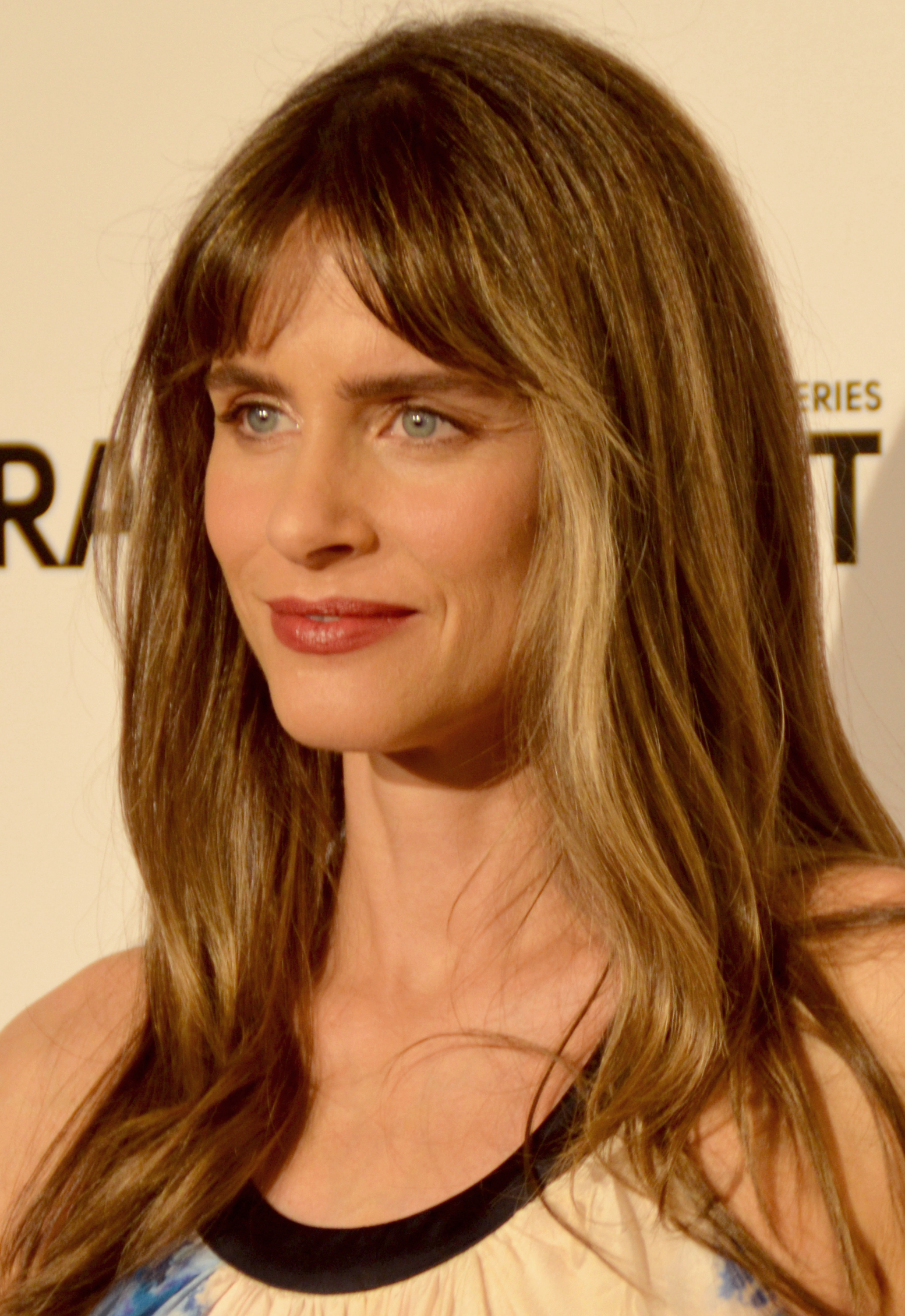
- Peet at the premiere screening of Transparent at the Ace Hotel in downtown Los Angeles, September 2014
- Born: January 11, 1972 (age 54); New York City, U.S.
- Education: Columbia University (BA)
- Occupation: Actress
- Years active: 1995–present
- Spouse: David Benioff (m. 2006)
- Children: 3
- Relatives: Stephen Friedman (father-in-law); Samuel Roxy Rothafel (great-grandfather); Samuel Levy (great-grandfather)

Amanda Peet (born January 11, 1972) is an American actress. She began her career with small parts on television before making her feature film debut in Animal Room (1995). Her portrayal of Jill St. Claire in The Whole Nine Yards (2000) brought her wider recognition. Since then, she has appeared in Saving Silverman (2001), High Crimes, Changing Lanes, Igby Goes Down (all 2002), Something's Gotta Give, Identity (both 2003), Melinda and Melinda (2004), A Lot like Love, Syriana (both 2005), The X-Files: I Want to Believe (2008), 2012 (2009), Gulliver's Travels (2010), Identity Thief, The Way, Way Back (both 2013), and other films.

In addition to film, Peet played Jacqueline Barrett on The WB's Jack & Jill (1999–2001), Jordan McDeere on NBC's short-lived Aaron Sorkin series Studio 60 on the Sunset Strip (2006–2007), Tina Morris on HBO's Togetherness (2015–2016), Jules on IFC's Brockmire (2016–2020), Betty Broderick on the second season of Bravo's Dirty John (2020), Beth Gallagher in the Paramount+ adaptation of Fatal Attraction (2023), and Mel Cooper in the Apple TV+ series Your Friends & Neighbors. In 2021, she wrote and co-executive produced The Chair for Netflix. Peet is married to screenwriter David Benioff and they have three children.

== Early life and education ==
Peet was born on January 11, 1972, in New York City, the daughter of Penny (née Levy), a social worker, and Charles Peet Jr., a corporate lawyer. Penny and Charles Peet later divorced. Peet's mother is Jewish; both were atheists. Her mother passed in 2025 due to Parkinson's disease. Her maternal great-grandfathers were Samuel Levy, a lawyer, businessman, and a public official who served as the president of Manhattan Borough; and Samuel "Roxy" Rothafel, a theatrical impresario and entrepreneur.

At seven, Amanda Peet moved with her family to London, returning to New York four years later. She enrolled in HB Studio's teen acting program when she was 13. Peet attended Friends Seminary in Manhattan and graduated from Columbia University, also in Manhattan, with a degree in American history. In college, she auditioned for professor Uta Hagen and became an actress after taking Hagen's class. During a four-year period of study with Hagen, Peet appeared in the off-Broadway revival of Clifford Odets's Awake and Sing! with Stephen Lang.

== Career ==
=== Early roles and breakthrough (1995–2004) ===
Peet's first screen performance was in a television commercial for Skittles. Her film debut was in the drama Animal Room (1995), which also starred Neil Patrick Harris and Matthew Lillard. She also appeared in the November 1995 episode "Hot Pursuit" of Law & Order. For much of the late 1990s, Peet maintained a steady acting career in relatively obscure independent films co-starring more established actors. In 1996, for instance, she appeared in One Fine Day, with George Clooney and Michelle Pfeiffer, and She's the One, with Jennifer Aniston and Cameron Diaz. Peet appeared in the critically acclaimed film Playing by Heart (1998), as part of an ensemble cast that included Sean Connery, Angelina Jolie, and Ryan Phillippe. She had her first major role as Jacqueline Barrett in the WB network series Jack & Jill, which aired for two seasons, between 1999 and 2001, to moderate success. She appeared in the eighth-season finale of Seinfeld ("The Summer of George") as a waitress whom Jerry Seinfeld dates. In 1999, Peet also starred in Simply Irresistible, a fantasy romantic comedy, opposite Sarah Michelle Gellar. The film was panned by critics and flopped at the box office.

Peet appeared alongside Bette Midler and Nathan Lane in Andrew Bergman's Isn't She Great (2000), a highly fictionalized account of the life and career of author Jacqueline Susann. However, her first role in a widely released feature film came later that year, with the part of Jill St. Claire in the mafia comedy film The Whole Nine Yards. The film, which also starred Bruce Willis and Matthew Perry, received mixed reviews. Roger Ebert gave it one of the more positive reviews, noting in particular that Peet's performance, which he called "perfect", highlighted the story. The Whole Nine Yards was a commercial success, grossing US$106.3 million worldwide. For her performance, she received a Blockbuster Entertainment Award nomination for Favorite Supporting Actress: Comedy, and a Teen Choice Award nomination for Choice Film Liar. In 2000, she played a love interest in the independent comedy Whipped, won the Young Hollywood Award for "Best New Style Maker", and was voted one of the 50 Most Beautiful People in the World by People.

Peet took on the role of a psychologist and the romantic interest of Jason Biggs in the comedy Saving Silverman (2001), and portrayed a heroin-addicted trophy mistress in the dramedy Igby Goes Down, which garnered acclaim among critics. She also played the wife of a successful, young Wall Street lawyer thriller film Changing Lanes (2002), with Ben Affleck. Also in 2002, she played the sister of Ashley Judd in the suspense thriller High Crimes, in which Judd and co-star Morgan Freeman take on the military's court-martial of Judd's husband for murder. In 2003, Peet appeared with Diane Keaton, Jack Nicholson and Keanu Reeves in the romantic comedy Something's Gotta Give, directed by Nancy Meyers, playing an auctioneer, working for Christie's. The film was a critical darling and a major success at the box office, grossing US$125 million in North America. In her other 2003 film release, the psychological horror thriller Identity, Peet starred as a Las Vegas prostitute, alongside John Cusack, Ray Liotta and John Hawkes. Identity received critical acclaim and was a moderate commercial success. In 2004, she starred in The Whole Ten Yards, the sequel to The Whole Nine Yards. Unlike the first film, this production was critically panned and flopped at the box office.

=== Established career (2005–2010) ===
Her most significant film role in 2005 was playing a woman becoming a successful photographer, opposite Ashton Kutcher, in the romantic comedy A Lot Like Love. It is about two people whose relationship slowly evolves from lust to friendship to romance over the course of seven years. While overall the response was mixed, the Los Angeles Times found Peet to be "charming and charismatic without being cloying or artificial." In 2005, she also performed in the play This Is How It Goes, filling in for Marisa Tomei at the last minute after six days of rehearsal, and appeared in the Woody Allen's tragicomedy Melinda and Melinda and the thriller Syriana, which was based loosely on former Central Intelligence Agency agent Robert Baer and his memoirs of being an agent in the Middle East.

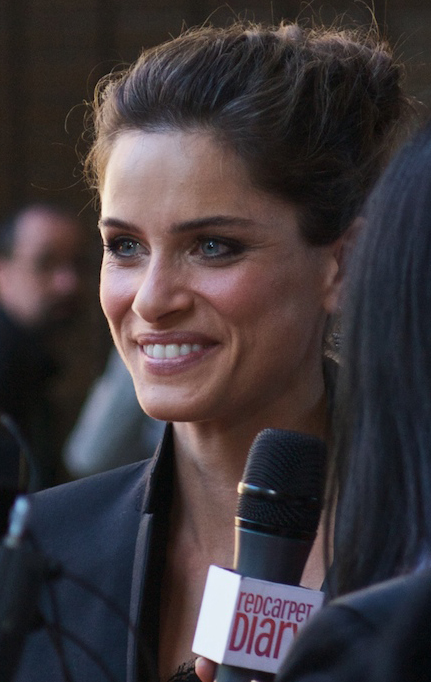
Peet at the 2008 Toronto International Film Festival

In 2006, Peet acted on Neil Simon's Broadway production of Barefoot in the Park, followed by the romantic drama Griffin & Phoenix, a remake of the 1976 ABC TV movie, in which she portrayed a terminally ill woman living life to the fullest. The television series Studio 60 on the Sunset Strip, which premiered on NBC in late 2006, featured her as the recently hired president of entertainment programming, with Matthew Perry, with whom she had starred in The Whole Nine Yards and The Whole Ten Yards, and Sarah Paulson, with whom she previously worked in Jack & Jill. For her role, Peet received a Satellite Award nomination for Best Actress – Television Series Drama. The series got a strong critical reaction to its pilot, but quickly suffered a backlash and was cancelled after one season.

Peet starred as an attorney who stays home to raise a new baby in the romantic comedy The Ex (2007), which went unnoticed by critics and audiences. In 2008, she starred in the mystery drama The X-Files: I Want to Believe (2008), as an FBI agent, the dramedy Five Dollars a Day (2008), as the girlfriend of a seemingly successful man, and the crime drama What Doesn't Kill You, as the wife of a Boston criminal. What Doesn't Kill You was her best reviewed film of 2008, with Lisa Schwarzbaum of Entertainment Weekly, writing that Peet "is terrific as Brian's worn-down wife, sick of seeing her man disappear before her eyes."

In 2012 (2009), a disaster film directed by Roland Emmerich, Peet reunited with John Cusack, to play his estranged wife. While critical response was mixed, the film made over US$769 million worldwide, becoming Peet's most widely seen film. In her next film, the dramedy Please Give (2010), she starred as a self-centered cosmetologist, with Catherine Keener and Rebecca Hall. It received a limited theatrical release and critical acclaim. Ethan Alter of Film Journal International felt that Peet "does career-best work here." Peet and the other Please Give cast members received a Gotham Award nomination for Best Ensemble Cast. In 2010, Peet also provided for one of the main characters of DVD sci-fi adventure film Quantum Quest: A Cassini Space Odyssey, and starred as the love interest of the main character in the live-action family adventure film Gulliver's Travels, with Jack Black, Emily Blunt and Jason Segel.

=== Roles in television (2011–2020) ===
In 2012, Peet headlined the television series Bent, as a recently divorced lawyer. She was drawn to the writing, stating: "I thought it was a good repartee. I love a good romantic comedy, and I love a repressed woman who needs to get laid." However, Bent was canceled after only six episodes. Peet had a recurring role as Capt. Laura Hellinger in seven episodes of the fourth season of The Good Wife (2012–13). In 2013, she made her playwriting debut with The Commons of Pensacola, starring Blythe Danner and Sarah Jessica Parker, and appeared in the film Identity Thief, as the wife of a man whose identity is stolen by a woman, the little-seen comedy Trust Me, as the neighbor of a former child star, and the well received dramedy The Way, Way Back, as one half of a married couple.

From 2015 to 2016, Peet played Tina Morris on the HBO series Togetherness, which focused on the lives of two couples living under the same roof. The show—which was created, written and directed by the Duplass brothers—ran for two seasons, and was praised for its intimate storytelling and the performances of its cast. IndieWire called it "the upbeat comedy HBO needs right now", and noted that while Melanie Lynskey is "the true standout", Peet "won't be short of fans". From 2016 to 2020, Peet appeared in Brockmire, as the owner of a Minor League Baseball team.

=== Writing and producing (2021–present) ===
In 2021, Netflix released The Chair, a six-episode comedic dramatic series written by Peet and produced by her, alongside David Benioff and D. B. Weiss. In 2025, Peet starred in and produced Fantasy Life directed by Matthew Shear. The jury at South by Southwest awarded Peet the Narrative Feature Competition Special Jury Award for Performance for her role. Since 2025, she has co-starred in the Apple TV+ drama series Your Friends and Neighbors alongside Jon Hamm and Olivia Munn.

== Other endeavors ==
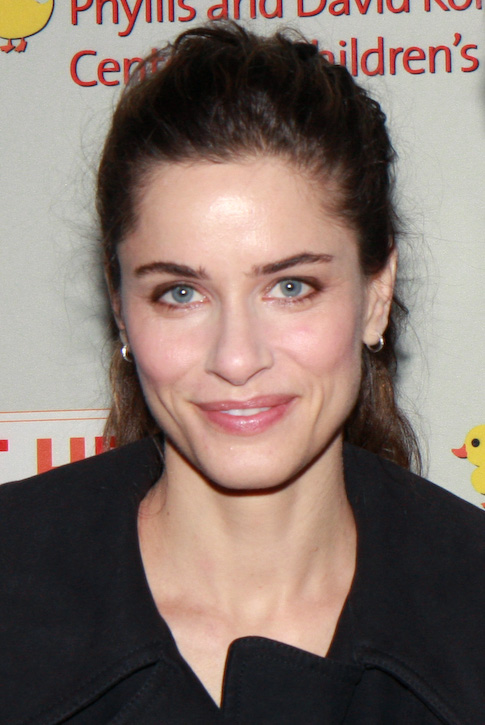
Peet at a benefit for pediatrics in Washington Heights, Manhattan, October 2009

=== Activism ===
In 2008, Peet volunteered to be a spokeswoman for Every Child By Two (ECBT), a non-profit organization that advocates childhood vaccination. Peet began working with the group after becoming concerned by the "amount of misinformation floating around [about vaccines], particularly in Hollywood." In an interview with Cookie, Peet stated: "Frankly, I feel that parents who don't vaccinate their children are parasites," referring to the benefit unvaccinated children derive from herd immunity and the concern that dropping vaccination rates may put all children at increased risk of preventable disease. Peet's comments stirred controversy; in response, she apologized for using the term "parasites," but affirmed her position on the importance and safety of vaccinations.

The 3rd Annual Independent Investigative Group IIG Awards recognizing the promotion of science in popular media was held on May 18, 2009. The IIG presented an award to Peet for her work campaigning for vaccines.

=== Writing ===
Peet has co-written a children's book Dear Santa, Love, Rachel Rosenstein about a Jewish girl during the Christmas season. The book was launched in 2015. She wrote a play Our Very Own Carlin McCullough, which ran for two months in 2018 at the Geffen Playhouse in Los Angeles to positive reviews.

== Personal life ==
Peet and screenwriter David Benioff, son of former Goldman Sachs CEO and chairman Stephen Friedman, married on September 30, 2006, at Friends Seminary. They have three children. The family lives in Manhattan and Beverly Hills, California. She said that she has more of a "cultural affiliation" with Judaism than religious and she appreciates the rituals. She marks Shabbat. Her children had bar and bat mitzvah ceremonies. In 2026, she expressed an interest in having an adult bat mitzvah.

Peet is a friend of actor Peter Dinklage, who starred in her husband's series Game of Thrones and whom she had met years earlier through friends at Bennington College in Bennington, Vermont. In 2008, she revealed that she has struggled with postpartum depression.

== Filmography ==
=== Film ===
Year	Title	Role	Notes
1995	Animal Room	Debbie	
1996	Winterlude	Unknown	Short film
1996	Virginity	Unknown	Short film
1996	She's the One	Molly	
1996	One Fine Day	Celia	
1997	Grind	Patty	
1997	Touch Me	Bridgette	
1997	Sax and Violins	Unknown	
1997	1999	Nicole	
1998	Origin of the Species	Julia	
1998	Southie	Marianne Silva	
1998	Playing by Heart	Amber	
1999	Simply Irresistible	Chris	
1999	Jump	Lisa	
1999	Two Ninas	Nina Harris	
1999	Body Shots	Jane Bannister	
2000	Zoe Loses It	Zoe	Short film
2000	Isn't She Great	Debbie Klausman	
2000	Track Down	Karen	
2000	The Whole Nine Yards	Jill St. Claire	
2000	Whipped	Mia	
2001	Date Squad	Belkis Felcher	Short film
2001	Saving Silverman	Judith Fessbegler	
2002	High Crimes	Jackie Grimaldi	
2002	Changing Lanes	Cynthia Delano Banek	
2002	Igby Goes Down	Rachel	
2003	Whatever We Do	Patty	Short film
2003	Identity	Paris	
2003	Something's Gotta Give	Marin Klein	
2004	The Whole Ten Yards	Jill St. Claire Tudeski	
2004	Melinda and Melinda	Susan	
2005	A Lot Like Love	Emily Friehl	
2005	Syriana	Julie Woodman	
2006	Griffin & Phoenix	Phoenix	
2006	The Ex	Sofia Kowalski	
2007	Battle for Terra	Maria Montez	Voice
2007	Martian Child	Harlee	
2008	The X-Files: I Want to Believe	ASAC Dakota Whitney	
2008	$5 a Day	Maggie	
2008	What Doesn't Kill You	Stacy Reilly	
2009	2012	Kate Curtis	
2010	Please Give	Mary	
2010	Quantum Quest: A Cassini Space Odyssey	Ranger	Voice
2010	Gulliver's Travels	Darcy Silverman	
2012	To the Wonder		Scenes cut
2013	The Way, Way Back	Joan	
2013	Identity Thief	Trish Patterson	
2013	Trust Me	Marcy	
2015	Sleeping with Other People	Paula	
2025	Fantasy Life	Dianne	Also producer

=== Television ===
Year	Title	Role	Notes
1995	Law & Order	Leslie Harlan	Episode: "Hot Pursuit"
1996	The Single Guy	Kathy	Episode: "Wedding"
1996	C.P.W.	Robyn Gainer	6 episodes
1997	Spin City	Shelly McCory	Episode: "Snowbound"
1997	Seinfeld	Lanette	Episode: "The Summer of George"
1997	Ellen Foster	Julia Hobbs	TV movie
1999	Partners	Beth Harmon	Episode: "Pilot"
1999–2001	Jack & Jill	Jacqueline Barrett	32 episodes
2005	Entourage	Herself	Episode: "Boys Are Back in Town"
2006–2007	Studio 60 on the Sunset Strip	Jordan McDeere	22 episodes
2009	Important Things with Demetri Martin	Actress	Episode: "Timing"
2009	Wainy Days	Jill	Episode: "Jill"
2010	How I Met Your Mother	Jenkins	Episode: "Jenkins"
2011	Bent	Alex Meyers	6 episodes
2012–2013	The Good Wife	Laura Hellinger	7 episodes
2015–2016	Togetherness	Tina Morris	Main role; 16 episodes
2017–2020	Brockmire	Jules James	Main role; 17 episodes
2018	The Romanoffs	Olivia Wells	Episode: "Expectation"
2020	Dirty John	Betty Broderick	Main role (season 2)
2023	Fatal Attraction	Beth Gallagher	Main role
2025–present	Your Friends & Neighbors	Mel Cooper	Main role

== Awards and nominations ==
Year	Work	Award	Category	Result
2001	The Whole Nine Yards	Blockbuster Entertainment Awards	Favorite Supporting Actress – Comedy or Romance	Nominated
2001	The Whole Nine Yards	Teen Choice Award	Choice Movie Liar	Nominated
2005	A Lot Like Love	Teen Choice Award	Choice Movie Actress – Comedy	Nominated
2007	Studio 60 on the Sunset Strip	Satellite Award	Best Actress in a Series – Drama	Nominated
2009	2012	Teen Choice Award	Choice Movie Actress – Sci-Fi	Nominated
2010	Please Give	Independent Spirit Award	Robert Altman Award	Won
2010	Please Give	Gotham Award	Best Ensemble Cast	Nominated
