= Jonah Meyerson =

American actor (born 1991)

- Born: September 20, 1991 (age 35); New York City, New York
- Occupation: Actor
- Years active: 2001–present

Jonah Meyerson (born September 20, 1991) is an American actor and television producer.

== Early life and education ==
Meyerson was born in New York City. He is a graduate of Stuyvesant High School, and the University of Pennsylvania as a member of the class of 2013. At UPenn, he was the head writer for and a cast member of Penn's Mask and Wig Club, the nation's oldest collegiate all-male musical comedy troupe. Meyerson also performed with Penn's improv comedy troupe, Without a Net. and was a 2013 member of Penn's Friars Senior Society.

== Career ==
Meyerson made his acting debut in Wes Anderson's 2001 award-winning film The Royal Tenenbaums. He played Uzi, the older son of Chas, played by Ben Stiller, and the grandson of characters played by Gene Hackman and Anjelica Huston. Meyerson was nominated for a Young Artist Award for his work on the film. He starred in Griffin and Phoenix, a Lifetime channel film also released on DVD. His work on that film earned him his second Young Artist Award nomination. In 2005, he was in the films Little Manhattan and The Matador, and in 2004, David Duchovny's House of D.

Since retiring from acting, Meyerson has become active in television production. During college, Meyerson was an intern for 30 Rock, Saturday Night Live and Onion News Network. He was later a post-production assistant for The Michael J. Fox Show and Unbreakable Kimmy Schmidt. Since 2016, he has worked as a production assistant, an associate producer, and a currently segment producer for The Late Show with Stephen Colbert.

== Filmography ==
=== Film ===
Year	Title	Role	Notes
2001	The Royal Tenenbaums	Uzi Tenenbaum	
2004	House of D	Kid #2	
2004	From Other Worlds	Henry Schwartzbaum	
2005	The Matador	Ten Year Old Boy	
2005	Little Manhattan	Sam	
2006	Griffin & Phoenix	Kirk	

=== Television ===
Year	Title	Role	Notes
2006	The Book of Daniel	Yoda	3 episodes
