= Whipped (2000 film) =

2000 film by Peter M. Cohen

- Theatrical release poster
- Directed by: Peter M. Cohen
- Written by: Peter M. Cohen
- Produced by: Peter M. Cohen; Matthew Cane
- Starring: Amanda Peet; Brian Van Holt; Jonathan Abrahams; Zorie Barber; Judah Domke
- Cinematography: Peter B. Kowalski
- Edited by: Tom McArdle
- Music by: Michael Montes
- Distributed by: Destination Films
- Release date: September 1, 2000
- Running time: 82 minutes
- Country: United States
- Language: English
- Budget: $3 million
- Box office: $4.8 million

Whipped is a 2000 American comedy film directed by Peter M. Cohen and starring Amanda Peet, Brian Van Holt, Jonathan Abrahams, Zorie Barber, and Judah Domke.

== Premise ==
Three single men gather at a local restaurant every Sunday, so they can discuss each other's sex lives; however, when each one of them falls in love with a beautiful girl named Mia (Amanda Peet), their weekly ritual becomes something of a trial, and their once strong friendships are put at risk.

== Cast ==
- Amanda Peet as Mia
- Brian Van Holt as Brad
- Beth Ostrosky as Beth
- Judah Domke as Eric
- Zorie Barber as Zeke
- Jonathan Abrahams as Jonathan
- Callie Thorne as Liz
- Bridget Moynahan as Marie

== Reception ==
On the review aggregator website Rotten Tomatoes, 13% of 68 critics' reviews are positive. The website's consensus reads: "The sex jokes in Whipped are tiresomely vulgar and unfunny. Critics also condemn the movie as cynical and mean-spirited, with no likable characters." Metacritic, which uses a weighted average, assigned the film a score of 10 out of 100, based on 26 critics, indicating "overwhelming dislike". Audiences polled by CinemaScore gave the film an average grade of "D+" on an A+ to F scale.
