= Griffin and Phoenix (1976 film) =

1976 American television film

- Video release cover
- Genre: Drama
- Written by: John Hill
- Directed by: Daryl Duke
- Starring: Peter Falk; Jill Clayburgh; Sally Kirkland; Dorothy Tristan; George Chandler
- Music by: George Tipton
- Country of origin: United States
- Original language: English

Production
- Executive producer: Paul Junger Witt
- Producers: Tony Thomas; David M. Shapiro; Judith Craig Marlin
- Production locations: 20th Century Fox Studios - 10201 Pico Blvd., Century City, Los Angeles, California
- Cinematography: Richard C. Glouner
- Editor: O. Nicholas Brown
- Running time: 97 minutes
- Production company: ABC Circle Films

Original release
- Network: ABC
- Release: February 27, 1976

Griffin and Phoenix (sometimes subtitled "A Love Story") is a 1976 American made-for-television romantic drama film produced by ABC Circle Films starring Peter Falk and Jill Clayburgh as title characters Geoffrey Griffin and Sarah Phoenix. Written by John Hill and directed by Daryl Duke, it first premiered on the ABC television network on February 27, 1976, and was also released to theaters in select countries under the title Today Is Forever from 1977 through 1980. It was nominated in the category of Outstanding Achievement in Cinematography at the 28th Primetime Emmy Awards.

It tells the story of two ill-fated middle-aged characters who both face a terminal cancer diagnosis and have months left to live. A chance meeting brings them together and they fall in love, both unaware of the other's shared fate. Notably, Jill Clayburgh developed the same type of cancer her character had in this film, succumbing to it in 2010. Peter Falk died just over six months later in 2011 from complications relating to Alzheimer's disease. Griffin and Phoenix was first distributed on VHS by 20th Century Fox in 1982, but has never been formally released on DVD or Blu-ray.

The film was remade in 2006 under the title Griffin & Phoenix, starring Dermot Mulroney and Amanda Peet.

== Plot ==
Geoffrey Griffin is in the midst of a camping trip with his estranged wife Jean Griffin, and their children Randy and Bob, at Yosemite National Park. His children and especially his wife are bored with the trip and uninterested in any family togetherness, despite his insistence. As the family is traveling back home, Griffin is driving the car while his wife and kids are being hauled in the camper behind him. He has a flashback to a doctor's visit where he is told that he has an inoperable form of terminal melanoma and will soon die, which is assumed to have been the motivating factor behind his initiative to take the trip, which his family had talked about doing before he and his wife separated. After becoming increasingly frustrated at his family's apathy about the trip, their reviling attitude toward him, and their trivial demands such as that he stop to walk the dog, he detaches his car from the camper and drives away, deserting them.

Sarah Phoenix is receiving news from her doctor that she has a terminal disease, leukemia. She is in denial regarding the diagnosis, and following an angry outburst she consults another doctor who delivers the same information. Geoffrey drives to Los Angeles, where he meets with his brother, George, who updates him on his ex-wife and children and gives him $1,500 to spend at his leisure. Faced with his grim diagnosis, Geoffrey expresses his interest in a course entitled "Psychological Processes of Death and Dying", which he attends. Sarah also attends the class, and it is where the two characters first meet. After class, Geoffrey asks Sarah to meet him the following Wednesday night for dinner if she were interested. She is guarded and shows a lack of interest in developing a close relationship with Griffin due to her terminal illness, and instead of showing up for the date she spies on Griffin from the neighboring restaurant, where he spots her and invites her over.

Griffin and Phoenix spend the next several weeks together falling in love and living their lives to the fullest, engaging in fun but outrageous and childish public behavior and constantly switching between an on-again and off-again relationship. Among their activities include sneaking into a movie theater, freighthopping, riding amusement park roller coasters and evading police after being caught painting messages on a water tower, where Phoenix writes "Class of '59" and Griffin secretly writes "Griffin Loves Phoenix" encased in a heart and arrow design. Neither knows that the other is also terminally ill until Sarah discovers books related to cancer, death and dying in Geoffrey's apartment, and bursts out at him in rage under the mistaken assumption that he had been stalking her and knew she was terminally ill. She tries to run away, and when Geoffrey catches her and questions her they both learn of each other's shared impending deaths. Sarah tells Geoffrey that when she becomes too ill to continue living a normal life, she will resign herself to a hospital and she does not want him to come and find her.

That day finally comes; Geoffrey finds a note from Sarah telling him that her pain was too unbearable, and that he should go spend time with his family and remember his promise not to try to find her. Distraught, Geoffrey seeks her out and finally finds her after searching at over a dozen hospitals, where he sits by her bedside and they comfort each other. Unable to handle the emotional distress of Geoffrey presence, Sarah asks him to leave, which he does, presumably never to return before her death. We then see Geoffrey browsing a cemetery, where he finds Sarah's gravestone that under her name and dates of birth and death reads: "P.S. – Hi Griffin Thought you'd probably drop by". He then proceeds to leave the cemetery and smash his own and several other cars in anger over her death. The film ends as we see a maintenance man painting over Sarah's and then Geoffrey's water tower messages.

== Cast ==
- Peter Falk as Geoffrey Griffin – An upbeat middle-aged man who faces a terminal illness and whose estranged wife and children, unaware of his diagnosis, seem uninterested in his company.
- Jill Clayburgh as Sarah Phoenix – An eccentric woman who faces similar dire circumstances and whose family is also distant.
- John Lehne as George Griffin – Geoffrey's older brother, the family member with whom he seemingly has the closest relationship.
- Dorothy Tristan as Jean Griffin – Geoffrey's unsympathetic wife from whom he is separated and has two children.
- Ben Hammer as Dr. Feinberg – Geoffrey's physician who delivers to him the news of his diagnosis.
- George Chandler as Old Man – A friend and neighbor of Geoffrey and Sarah's.
- Milton Parsons as Professor – A college professor who is teaching the course on death and dying at which Geoffrey and Sarah first meet.
- John Harkins as Dr. Glenn – Sarah's first doctor, with whom she becomes frustrated at her diagnosis.
- Ken Sansom as Dr. Harding – Sarah's second doctor.
- Randy Faustino as Randy Griffin – Geoffrey's first son.
- Steven Rogers as Bob Griffin – Geoffrey's second son.
- Sally Kirkland as Jody – Sarah's high school friend.
- Rod Haase as Usher

== Novelization ==
The screenplay was novelized and published by Warner Books in 1976 under the title: Griffin Loves Phoenix, a novel by John Hill.
