= Matthew Perry =

American and Canadian actor (1969–2023)

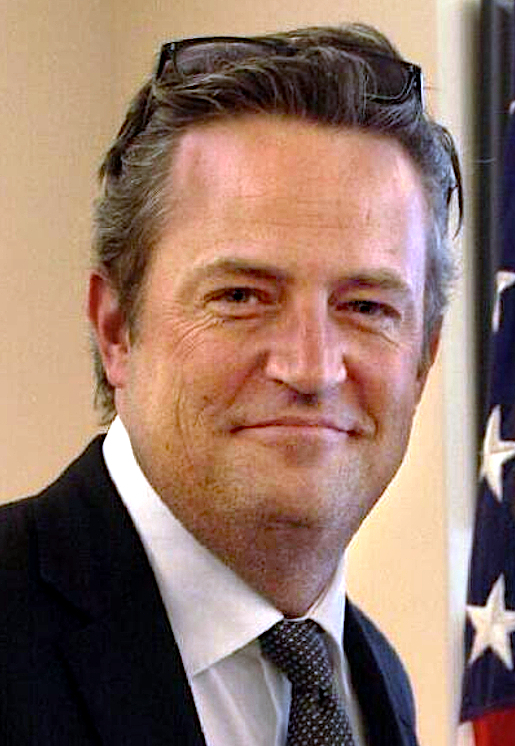
- Perry in 2013
- Born: Matthew Langford Perry; August 19, 1969; Williamstown, Massachusetts, US
- Died: October 28, 2023 (aged 54); Los Angeles, California, US
- Burial place: Forest Lawn Memorial Park, Hollywood Hills, California
- Citizenship: United States; Canada
- Occupation: Actor
- Years active: 1979–2022
- Parent: John Bennett Perry

Matthew Langford Perry (August 19, 1969 – October 28, 2023) was a Canadian and American actor. Known primarily for his work in comedy, he gained international fame for starring as Chandler Bing on the NBC television sitcom Friends (1994–2004), receiving his first Primetime Emmy Award nomination in 2002 for the role. Perry also appeared on Ally McBeal (2002), The West Wing (2003), and The Ron Clark Story (2006) receiving Primetime Emmy Award nominations for his performances in the latter two. He played a leading role in the NBC series Studio 60 on the Sunset Strip (2006–2007), and also became known for his leading film roles in Fools Rush In (1997), Almost Heroes (1998), Three to Tango (1999), The Whole Nine Yards (2000), Serving Sara (2002), The Whole Ten Yards (2004), and 17 Again (2009).

Perry was the co-creator, co-writer, executive producer, and star of the ABC sitcom Mr. Sunshine, which ran from February to April 2011. In August 2012, he starred as sportscaster Ryan King on the NBC sitcom Go On. He co-developed and starred in a revival of the CBS sitcom The Odd Couple portraying Oscar Madison from 2015 to 2017. He had recurring roles in the legal dramas The Good Wife (2012–2013), and The Good Fight (2017). Perry portrayed Ted Kennedy in The Kennedys: After Camelot (2017) and appeared as himself in his final television appearance, Friends: The Reunion (2021). He voiced Benny in the video game Fallout: New Vegas (2010).

For most of his life, Perry suffered from severe addictions to drugs and alcohol. Through his recovery, he became an advocate for rehabilitation and a spokesperson for the National Association of Drug Court Professionals. In 2013, Perry received the Champion of Recovery Award from the White House Office of National Drug Control Policy. In 2022, he released his memoir, Friends, Lovers, and the Big Terrible Thing. He died on October 28, 2023, at age 54, from the acute effects of ketamine use, exacerbated by accidental drowning. Five people were charged in connection with helping him acquire lethal doses of the drug; all five pleaded guilty and were sentenced to house arrest or prison.

Perry's portrayal of Chandler Bing was regarded as one of television's most recognizable comic performances. Critics noted his precision timing and a distinctive cadence that was widely imitated and quoted, and that he brought a rare strain of vulnerability to the sitcom archetype.

== Early life and education ==
Matthew Langford Perry was born on August 19, 1969, in Williamstown, Massachusetts. His mother, Suzanne Marie Morrison (née Langford, born 1943), is a Canadian journalist who was press secretary to Canadian prime minister Pierre Trudeau. His father, John Bennett Perry (born 1941), is an American actor and former model.

Perry's parents separated when he was a year old and his mother married Canadian broadcast journalist Keith Morrison. Perry was mostly raised by his mother in Ottawa, Ontario. He attended Rockcliffe Park Public School and Ashbury College, a boarding school in Ottawa. He had four younger maternal half-siblings—Caitlin, Emily, Will, and Madeline—as well as a younger paternal half-sister named Maria. His siblings "would stand and applaud" him for early performances.

By the age of 10, Perry had begun exhibiting behavioral problems, including stealing money, and smoking. He let his grades slip and beat up fellow student (and future Canadian prime minister) Justin Trudeau. Perry later attributed his behavior to his feeling like a family outsider who no longer belonged once his mother began having children with Morrison. He wrote, "I was so often on the outside looking in, still that kid up in the clouds on a flight to somewhere else, unaccompanied." At age 14, Perry began consuming alcohol, and was drinking every day by his 18th birthday. He practiced tennis, often for 10 hours per day, and became a top-ranked junior player in Canada with the possibility of a tennis career. However, his prospects diminished when he moved from Ottawa, at age 15, to live with his father in Los Angeles, where competition was much tougher.

At 15, Perry began studying acting at the Buckley School, a college-preparatory school in Sherman Oaks, Los Angeles, from which he graduated in 1987. While in high school, he took improvisational comedy classes at L.A. Connection in Sherman Oaks.

== Career ==
=== 1979–1993: Early roles ===
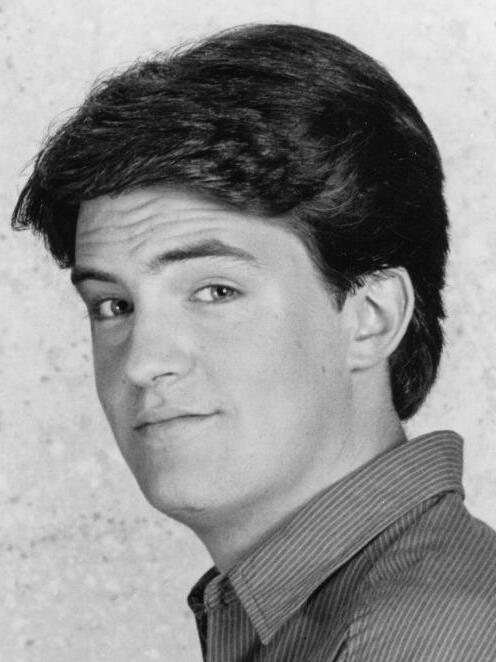
Perry in 1987

Perry's first credited role was a small part in 240-Robert in 1979 as a child actor. Shortly after moving to Los Angeles, Perry started auditioning for roles. Perry made guest appearances on Not Necessarily the News in 1983, Charles in Charge in 1985, and Silver Spoons in 1986. In 1987 and 1988, he played Chazz Russell in the television series Second Chance (later called Boys Will Be Boys). Perry made his film debut in 1988 with A Night in the Life of Jimmy Reardon. In 1989, he had a three-episode arc on Growing Pains, portraying Carol Seaver's boyfriend Sandy, who dies in a drunk driving incident.

Perry was cast as a regular on the 1990 CBS sitcom Sydney, playing the younger brother of Valerie Bertinelli's character. In 1991, he made a guest appearance on Beverly Hills, 90210 as Roger Azarian. Perry played the starring role in the ABC sitcom Home Free, which aired in 1993.

=== 1994–2004: Breakthrough with Friends ===
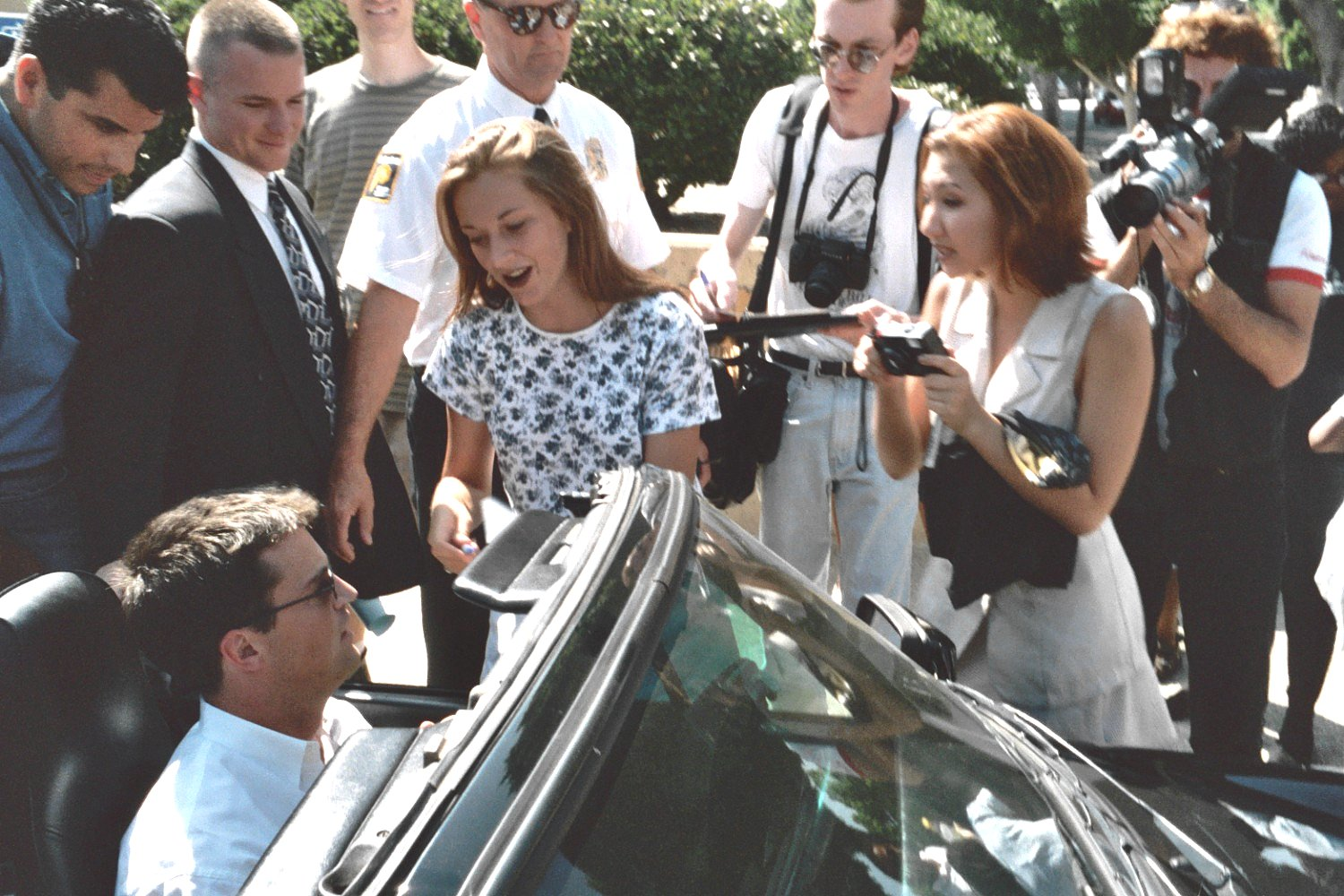
Perry departing from rehearsal for the 1995 Emmy Awards

Perry's commitment to a pilot for a sitcom called LAX 2194, set in the baggage handling department of Los Angeles Airport 200 years in the future, initially made him unavailable for a role in another pilot, Six of One, later called Friends. After the LAX 2194 pilot fell through, he had the opportunity to read for a part in Six of One and was cast as Chandler Bing. At age 24, he was the youngest member of the main cast. After making the pilot and while waiting for the show, eventually retitled Friends, to air, Perry spent the summer of 1993 performing at the Williamstown Theater Festival alongside Gwyneth Paltrow.

Friends was hugely successful, and it made Perry an international celebrity. By 2002, he and his co-stars Jennifer Aniston, Courteney Cox, Lisa Kudrow, Matt LeBlanc, and David Schwimmer were making $1 million per episode. The program earned him an Emmy nomination in 2002 for the Outstanding Lead Actor in a Comedy Series award. Perry appeared in films such as Fools Rush In, Almost Heroes, Three to Tango, The Whole Nine Yards and its sequel The Whole Ten Yards, and Serving Sara.

For his performance as Joe Quincy in The West Wing, Perry received two Emmy nominations for Outstanding Guest Actor in a Drama Series in 2003 and 2004. He appeared as attorney Todd Merrick in two episodes of Ally McBeal. In 2004, he made his directorial debut and acted in an episode of the fourth season of the comedy-drama Scrubs, an episode which included his father.

=== 2005–2022: Later work ===
Perry starred in the TNT movie The Ron Clark Story, which premiered August 13, 2006, and received a Golden Globe and Emmy nomination for his performance. From 2006 to 2007, he appeared in Aaron Sorkin's drama Studio 60 on the Sunset Strip. Perry played Matt Albie alongside Bradley Whitford's Danny Tripp, a writer-director duo brought in to help save a failing sketch show.

In 2006, Perry began filming Numb, a film based on a man suffering from depersonalization disorder. The release was postponed several times, but it was finally released on DVD on May 13, 2008. Perry also appeared on stage in London in David Mamet's Sexual Perversity in Chicago. In 2008, Perry starred in the independent film Birds of America. Showtime passed on a pilot called The End of Steve, a dark comedy starring, written, and produced by Perry and Peter Tolan.

In 2009, Perry starred in the film 17 Again playing a 37-year-old man who transforms into his 17-year-old self (Zac Efron) after an accident. The film received mixed reviews and was a box-office success. A review on WRC-TV found Perry miscast in his role, emphasizing the disbelief in Efron growing up to resemble Perry, both physically and behaviorally — a sentiment echoed by other critics.

In 2009, Perry was a guest on The Ellen DeGeneres Show, when he presented Ellen DeGeneres with an Xbox 360 video game console and a copy of the game Fallout 3. The gesture led to game studio Obsidian Entertainment casting him in Fallout: New Vegas as the voice of Benny.

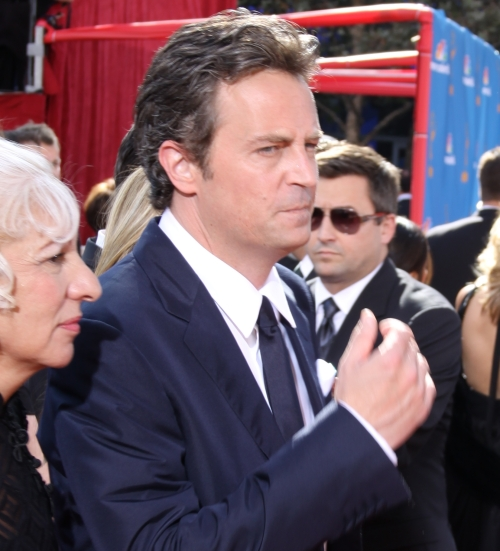
Perry at the 62nd Primetime Emmy Awards in 2010

Perry's new comedy pilot, Mr. Sunshine, based on his original idea for the show, was bought by ABC. He played the lead role as a middle-aged man with an identity crisis. ABC canceled the series after nine episodes in 2011.

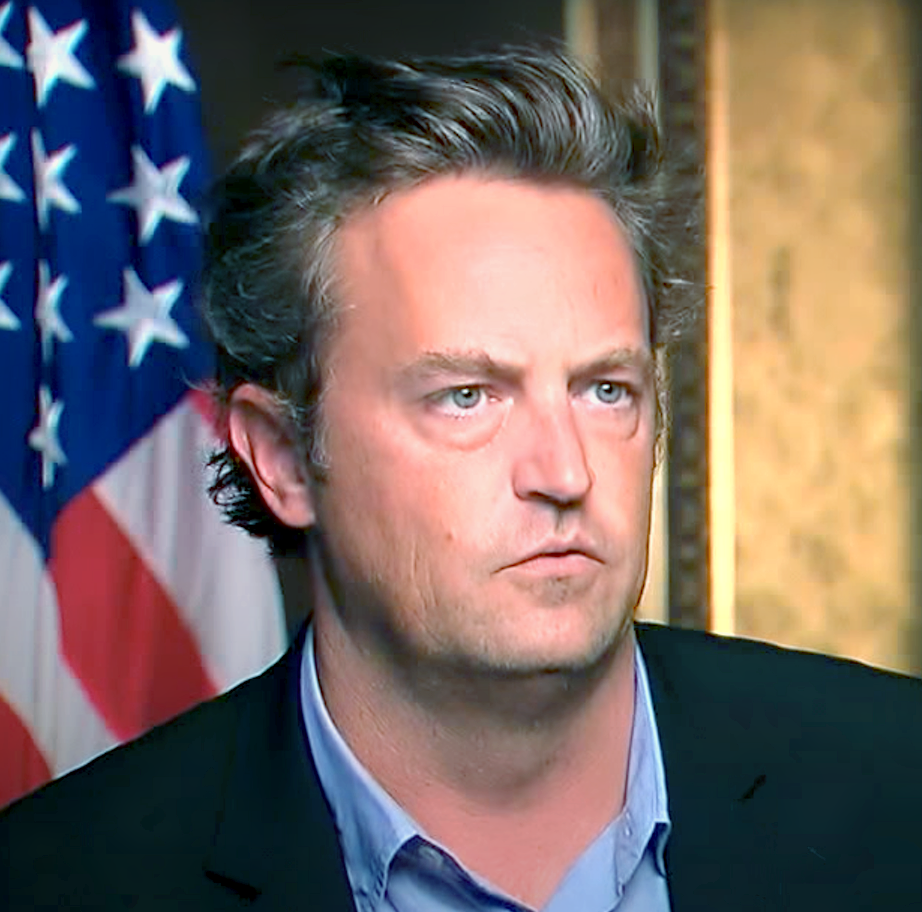
Perry in 2012

In 2012, Perry starred in the NBC comedy series Go On, written and produced by former Friends writer/producer Scott Silveri. Perry portrayed Ryan King, a sportscaster who tries to move on after the death of his wife through the help of mandatory therapy sessions. In the same year, he guest-starred on the CBS drama The Good Wife as attorney Mike Kresteva. He reprised his role in the fourth season in 2013.

In 2014, Perry made his British television debut in the one-off comedy program The Dog Thrower, which aired on May 1 as part of Sky Arts' Playhouse Presents. He portrayed "a charismatic man" who enchanted onlookers by throwing his dog in the air. From 2015 to 2017, Perry starred in, co-wrote, and served as executive producer of a reboot of the sitcom The Odd Couple on CBS. He played Oscar Madison opposite Thomas Lennon as Felix Unger.

Perry played the lead role in the world premiere production of his play The End of Longing, which opened on February 11, 2016, at the Playhouse Theatre in London. Its limited run proved successful despite mixed reviews. Perry restructured the play and appeared alongside Jennifer Morrison in its second off-Broadway production, which opened at the Lucille Lortel Theatre on June 5, 2017. It closed on July 1 after receiving poor reviews. Years later Perry described the play as "a personal message to the world, an exaggerated form of me as a drunk. I had something important to say to people like me, and to people who love people like me."

In March 2017, Perry again reprised his role as attorney Mike Kresteva in The Good Fight, a sequel show to the CBS drama The Good Wife. Later that year, he starred as Ted Kennedy in the mini-series The Kennedys: After Camelot.

In May 2021, he participated in the special episode Friends: The Reunion. He was meant to have a role in Don't Look Up, but withdrew in 2020 because of CPR-induced broken ribs. Perry published a memoir, Friends, Lovers, and the Big Terrible Thing, in October 2022. It became a bestseller on both Amazon and The New York Times charts.

== Personal life ==
Perry held American citizenship by birth and Canadian citizenship through his mother. He dated Yasmine Bleeth in 1995, Julia Roberts from 1995 to 1996, and Lizzy Caplan from 2006 to 2012. In November 2020, Perry became engaged to literary manager Molly Hurwitz. Their engagement ended in 2021. Perry never married or had any children.

Residences owned at some point by Perry included a condo in Sierra Towers purchased from Elton John, a house in Hollywood Hills, a house in Malibu, and a cottage in Pacific Palisades. In 2017, Perry purchased a condo occupying the top floor of The Century in Los Angeles for $20 million, selling it to Nick Molnar for $21.6 million in 2021. In June 2023, Perry purchased a mid-century modern house in Hollywood Hills.

Perry had a perfectionist and obsessive personality, spending many hours perfecting his answering machine message. He also believed in God, with whom he had "a very close relationship", calling himself "a seeker".

=== Health and addiction ===
In his memoirs, Perry wrote that by age 14, he had become an alcoholic. He later described his first drink as "For the first time in my life, nothing bothered me. The world made sense; it wasn’t bent and crazy. I was complete, at peace.… I thought; this is what I’ve been missing. This must be how normal people feel all the time." He became addicted to Vicodin after a jet ski accident in 1997 and completed a 28-day rehab program at the Hazelden Betty Ford Foundation that year. His weight dropped to 128 pounds (58 kg) as he took as many as 55 Vicodin pills per day. In May 2000, he was admitted to Cedars-Sinai Medical Center with alcohol-induced pancreatitis.

In February 2001, Perry paused productions of Friends and Serving Sara for two months to enter in-patient rehabilitation for his addictions to Vicodin, methadone, amphetamines and alcohol. He said later that, due to his substance use disorder, he had no memory of three years of his work on Friends. Perry said in 2002 that he made an effort not to drink on the set of Friends but arrived with extreme hangovers and sometimes would shake or sweat excessively. During later seasons, he was frequently drunk or high on set. His castmates made efforts to help him, and staged an intervention, but were unsuccessful. In 2011, Perry voluntarily checked into a rehabilitation facility for a month, though a press release clarified that had not relapsed.

In 2018, Perry spent five months in a hospital for a gastrointestinal perforation. During the hospital stay, Perry nearly died after his colon burst from opioid abuse. He spent two weeks in a coma and used a colostomy bag for nine months. Doctors told his family that Perry had a 2% chance of survival when he was admitted. He was connected to an extracorporeal membrane oxygenation (ECMO) machine.

Perry faked pain to get a prescription for 1,800 milligrams of hydrocodone per day and was having daily ketamine infusions. He was given propofol in conjunction with a surgery, which stopped his heart for five minutes. The resulting CPR resulted in eight broken ribs. He paid $175,000 for a private jet to take him to Los Angeles to get more drugs. When doctors there refused, he booked another $175,000 private flight to fly back to Switzerland that night. In 2022, he estimated that he had spent $9 million on his addiction, including 14 stomach surgeries, 15 stays in rehab and therapy twice a week for 30 years, and had attended approximately 6,000 Alcoholics Anonymous meetings.

=== Philanthropy and advocacy ===
In July 2011, Perry lobbied the United States Congress as a celebrity spokesperson for the National Association of Drug Court Professionals in support of funding for drug courts. He received a Champion of Recovery award in May 2013 from the White House Office of National Drug Control Policy for opening Perry House, a rehab center in his former mansion in Malibu. In 2015, Perry sold the mansion and relocated its services. During the COVID-19 pandemic, he launched an apparel line inspired by Friends, with proceeds donated to the World Health Organization's COVID-19 relief fund.

== Death and funeral ==
On October 28, 2023, Perry was found unresponsive in a jacuzzi at his home in Pacific Palisades, Los Angeles. He was pronounced dead at 4:17 pm the same day. He was 54 years old.

On November 3, 2023, Perry's funeral was held at Forest Lawn Memorial Park in Los Angeles where he was buried. His father, mother and stepfather attended, as did his five Friends co-stars. The Peter Gabriel and Kate Bush song "Don't Give Up" was played; Perry was enamored of the song and referenced it in signed copies of his autobiography, released in part to help people suffering from depression or addiction issues. Following Perry's death, the National Philanthropic Trust established the Matthew Perry Foundation to support people suffering from addiction.

On December 15, 2023, Perry's death was revealed to have occurred due to acute effects of ketamine. Other circumstances that contributed to his death included the effects of buprenorphine, drowning, and coronary artery disease. The Los Angeles County Department of Medical Examiner said in a statement that

...at the high levels of ketamine found in his post-mortem blood specimens, the main lethal effects would be from both cardiovascular overstimulation and respiratory depression... ...drowning contributes due to the likelihood of submersion into the pool as he lapsed into unconsciousness; coronary artery disease contributes due to exacerbation of ketamine induced myocardial effects on the heart.

Perry had been receiving ketamine-assisted psychotherapy sessions to treat anxiety. His last known session occurred the week before his death. However, the report stated that the ketamine in his system at death could not be from that infusion, since ketamine's half-life is 3 to 4 hours or less.

=== Investigation and guilty pleas ===
In May 2024, the Los Angeles Police Department opened an investigation to determine how Perry obtained the high dose of ketamine that caused his death. On August 15, 2024, indictments and criminal charges were filed against five individuals: Perry's personal assistant, Kenneth Iwamasa; two physicians, Mark Chavez and Salvador Plasencia; and two alleged drug dealers (television director Erik Fleming and Jasveen Sangha, known as the "Ketamine Queen"). Prosecutors alleged that the defendants were involved in the distribution of ketamine that resulted in Perry's death, as well as the death of at least one other individual.

Three of the accused – Fleming, Iwamasa, and Chavez – agreed to plead guilty. Chavez's medical license was initially reported as suspended, but was later confirmed to have been voluntarily surrendered the following month. Following her arrest in August 2024, Sangha had her bail revoked; since then, she has been held at a federal prison.

According to U.S. Attorney E. Martin Estrada, Perry paid the two doctors approximately $55,000 in cash for ketamine during the two months preceding his death. Iwamasa admitted to obtaining ketamine for Perry and administering injections, while Fleming admitted to obtaining ketamine from suppliers and delivering it to Iwamasa for Perry's use. Text messages entered into evidence showed that Plasencia purchased ketamine supplied to Perry from Chavez, including one message in which Plasencia asked Chavez, "I wonder how much this moron will pay."

However, prosecutors stated that the primary supplier of the ketamine Perry used at the time of his death was Jasveen Sangha, described as a major drug dealer serving "high-end and celebrities." Sangha's North Hollywood residence, which was raided by the U.S. Drug Enforcement Administration in March 2024, was characterised as a "drug-selling emporium." In his guilty plea, Fleming admitted that he obtained 71 vials of ketamine from Sangha, which were intended for sale to Perry. Plasencia and Sangha were identified by prosecutors as the primary targets of the investigation, with Sangha becoming Perry's main supplier after Plasencia reduced his distribution of ketamine.

On August 18, 2025, Sangha, the final defendant in the case, had her guilty plea, which was signed on August 14, 2025, officially filed in court. Sangha pleaded guilty to one count of maintaining a drug-involved premises, three counts of distribution of ketamine, and one count of distribution of ketamine resulting in death or serious injury. She agreed to the plea shortly before her trial was scheduled to begin in September 2025. At the time, Sangha also admitted to selling ketamine that contributed to at least one prior fatal overdose. Sangha formally entered guilty pleas to all five counts while appearing before the U.S. District Court for the Central District of California on September 3, 2025.

Plasencia, who remained free on bond until sentencing, faced up to 10 years' imprisonment on each of the four charges to which he pleaded guilty, for a combined statutory maximum of 40 years. In September 2025, Plasencia surrendered his California medical license. On December 3, 2025, Plasencia, the first defendant in the case to be sentenced, received a sentence of 30 months' imprisonment followed by two years of supervised release; he was also ordered to pay a $5,600 fine. Following sentencing, Plasencia surrendered and was taken into federal custody.

It was later acknowledged that Chavez had relinquished his medical license, which had initially been reported as merely "suspended," after entering his guilty plea. On December 16, 2025, Chavez was sentenced to eight months of house arrest, three years of supervised release, and 300 hours of community service. Chavez would begin his sentence on December 17, 2025.

Fleming, who pleaded guilty to one count of conspiracy to distribute ketamine and one count of distribution of ketamine resulting in death, faced a maximum sentence of 25 years' imprisonment. Fleming was scheduled to be sentenced on January 7, 2026. On May 13, 2026, Fleming was sentenced to two years in prison.

Iwamasa, who pleaded guilty to a single count of conspiracy to distribute ketamine resulting in death, faced a maximum sentence of 15 years' imprisonment. Iwamasa was scheduled to be sentenced on January 14, 2026. On May 27, 2026, Iwamasa was sentenced to 41 months in prison, ordered to pay fines of $10,000 and $100, and be on supervised released for two years. Iwamasa began his sentence on July 20, 2026.

Sangha faced a statutory maximum of 45 years' imprisonment. In December 2025, the office of the U.S. Attorney for the Central District of California confirmed that Sangha was scheduled to be sentenced on February 25, 2026. On April 8, 2026, Sangha received a 15-year prison sentence to be served in a federal prison.

== Legacy ==
Perry's portrayal of Chandler Bing on Friends became one of television's most recognizable comic performances. Critics noted his precision timing and a distinctive "could I be any more…?" cadence that was widely imitated and quoted, and that he brought a rare strain of vulnerability to the sitcom archetype.

Beyond acting, Perry advocated for addiction recovery. In 2013 he met with the White House Office of National Drug Control Policy to support drug courts, and that year opened Perry House, a men's sober-living facility in his former Malibu home, which operated from 2013 to 2015. He said he hoped to be remembered more for helping people achieve sobriety than for his acting career, a mission continued by the Matthew Perry Foundation, launched days after his death. Tributes reflected that impact: the main Friends cast issued a joint statement, and Max added an on-screen memorial card to the series. On August 19, 2025, Perry's Fools Rush In co-star Salma Hayek marked what would have been his 56th birthday with an Instagram tribute.

In May 2026, Heritage Auctions partnered with the Matthew Perry Foundation to sell his collection of art, Friends memorabilia, and accessories. In October 2026, Netflix released a documentary miniseries about Perry, The One About Matthew Perry. In June 2026, original artworks by Banksy from the actor's estate were sold at Heritage Auctions (Girl with Balloon 2005 for £889,979 and Nola 2008 for £88,979).

== Acting credits ==
=== Film ===
Year	Title	Role	Notes	Ref.
1988	A Night in the Life of Jimmy Reardon	Fred Roberts	Credited as Matthew L. Perry	
1989	She's Out of Control	Timothy	Credited as Matthew L. Perry	
1989	Fat Man and Little Boy	Bomb Technician	Uncredited	
1994	Getting In	Randal Burns	Direct-to-video	
1997	Fools Rush In	Alex Whitman		
1998	Almost Heroes	Leslie Edwards		
1999	Three to Tango	Oscar Novak		
2000	The Whole Nine Yards	Nicholas "Oz" Oseransky		
2000	The Kid	Mr. Vivian	Uncredited cameo	
2002	Serving Sara	Joe Tyler		
2004	The Whole Ten Yards	Nicholas "Oz" Oseransky		
2006	The Ron Clark Story	Ron Clark	TV movie	
2007	Numb	Hudson Milbank	Also executive producer	
2008	Birds of America	Morrie		
2008	The End of Steve	Steve	TV movie	
2009	17 Again	Older Mike O'Donnell		
2015	Misery Loves Comedy	Himself	Documentary	

=== Television ===
Year	Title	Role	Notes	Ref.
1979	240-Robert	Arthur	Episode: "Bank Job"	
1983	Not Necessarily the News	Bob	Episode: "Audrie in Love"	
1985	Charles in Charge	Ed	Credited as Matthew L. Perry; episode: "The Wrong Guy"	
1986	Silver Spoons	Davey	Episode: "Rick Moves Out"	
1987	The Tracey Ullman Show	Craig	Sketch: "Click"	
1987–1988	Second Chance/Boys Will Be Boys	Chazz Russell	Main role	
1988	Dance 'til Dawn	Roger	Television film	
1988	Just the Ten of Us	Ed	Credited as Matthew L. Perry; episode: "The Dinner Test"	
1988	Highway to Heaven	David Hastings	2 episodes	
1989	Empty Nest	Bill at 18	Episode: "A Life in the Day"	
1989	Growing Pains	Sandy	Recurring role	
1990	Sydney	Billy Kells	Main role	
1990	Who's the Boss?	Benjamin Dawson	Episode: "Roomies"	
1990	Call Me Anna	Desi Arnaz Jr.	Television film; credited as Matthew L. Perry	
1991	Beverly Hills, 90210	Roger Azarian	Episode: "April Is the Cruelest Month"	
1992	Dream On	Alex Farmer	Episode: "To the Moon, Alex!"	
1992	Sibs	Chas	Episode: "What Makes Lily Run?"	
1993	Deadly Relations	George Westerfield	Television film	
1993	Home Free	Matt Bailey	Main role	
1994	Parallel Lives	Willi Morrison	Television film	
1994–2004	Friends	Chandler Bing	Main role	
1995	Caroline in the City	Chandler Bing	Episode: "Caroline and the Folks"	
1995	The John Larroquette Show	Steven	Episode: "Rachel Redux"	
1997	Saturday Night Live	Host	Episode: "Matthew Perry/Oasis"	
2001	The Simpsons	Himself	Voice; episode: "Treehouse of Horror XII"	
2002	Ally McBeal	Todd Merrick	2 episodes	
2003	The West Wing	Joe Quincy	Recurring role; 3 episodes	
2004	Scrubs	Murray Marks	Also director; episode: "My Unicorn"	
2006	The Ron Clark Story	Ron Clark	Television film	
2006–2007	Studio 60 on the Sunset Strip	Matt Albie	Main role	
2011	Childrens Hospital	Himself	Episode: "The Black Doctor"	
2011	Mr. Sunshine	Ben Donovan	Main role; also creator, executive producer and writer	
2012–2013	The Good Wife	Mike Kresteva	Recurring role	
2012–2013	Go On	Ryan King	Main role; also executive producer	
2014	Cougar Town	Sam Johnston	Episode: "Like a Diamond"	
2014	Playhouse Presents	The Charismatic Man	Episode: "The Dog Thrower"	
2015	Web Therapy	Tyler Bishop	2 episodes	
2015–2017	The Odd Couple	Oscar Madison	Main role; also creator, executive producer and writer	
2017	The Good Fight	Mike Kresteva	Recurring role	
2017	The Kennedys: After Camelot	Ted Kennedy	Miniseries; also executive producer	
2021	Friends: The Reunion	Himself	Also executive producer	
2026	The One About Matthew Perry	Himself	Documentary series (posthumous)	

=== Theater ===
Year	Title	Role	Notes	Ref.
2003	Sexual Perversity in Chicago	Danny	Comedy Theatre, London	
2016	The End of Longing	Jack	Also playwright; Playhouse Theatre, London	
2017	The End of Longing	Jack	Also playwright; Lucille Lortel Theater, Off-Broadway	

=== Video games ===
Year	Title	Voice role	Ref.
2010	Fallout: New Vegas	Benny	

=== Specials ===
Year	Title	Role	Notes	Ref.
2013	TSN: The Hangover	Angry Matthew Perry	Cameo	

== Awards and nominations ==
Awards and nominations received by Matthew Perry
Award	Year	Category	Nominated work	Result	Ref.
Golden Globe Awards	2007	Best Actor – Miniseries or Television Film	The Ron Clark Story	Nominated	
Primetime Emmy Awards	2002	Outstanding Lead Actor in a Comedy Series	Friends	Nominated (Note: Primetime Emmy Award nomination for Friends episode: "The One Where Chandler Takes a Bath")	
Primetime Emmy Awards	2003	Outstanding Guest Actor in a Drama Series	The West Wing	Nominated	
Primetime Emmy Awards	2004	Outstanding Guest Actor in a Drama Series	The West Wing	Nominated	
Primetime Emmy Awards	2007	Outstanding Lead Actor in a Miniseries or Movie	The Ron Clark Story	Nominated	
Primetime Emmy Awards	2021	Outstanding Variety Special (Pre-Recorded)	Friends: The Reunion	Nominated (Note: Shared with Ben Winston, Kevin Bright, Marta Kauffman, David Crane, Jennifer Aniston, Courteney Cox, Lisa Kudrow, Matt LeBlanc, David Schwimmer, Emma Conway, James Longman, Stacey Thomas, Brett Blakeney, David Piendak, Carly Segal, Guy Harding, Paul Monaghan, James Corden, Tracie Fiss, Mike Darnell, Brooke Karzen)	
Screen Actors Guild Awards	1996	Outstanding Performance by an Ensemble in a Comedy Series	Friends	Won (Note: Shared with Jennifer Aniston, Courteney Cox, Lisa Kudrow, Matt LeBlanc, David Schwimmer)	
Screen Actors Guild Awards	1999	Outstanding Performance by an Ensemble in a Comedy Series	Friends	Nominated	
Screen Actors Guild Awards	2000	Outstanding Performance by an Ensemble in a Comedy Series	Friends	Nominated	
Screen Actors Guild Awards	2001	Outstanding Performance by an Ensemble in a Comedy Series	Friends	Nominated	
Screen Actors Guild Awards	2002	Outstanding Performance by an Ensemble in a Comedy Series	Friends	Nominated	
Screen Actors Guild Awards	2003	Outstanding Performance by an Ensemble in a Comedy Series	Friends	Nominated	
Screen Actors Guild Awards	2004	Outstanding Performance by an Ensemble in a Comedy Series	Friends	Nominated	
Screen Actors Guild Awards	2007	Outstanding Performance by a Male Actor in a Television Movie or Miniseries	The Ron Clark Story	Nominated	
American Comedy Awards	1996	Funniest Supporting Male Performer in a TV Series	Friends	Nominated	
American Comedy Awards	1998	Funniest Supporting Male Performer in a TV Series	Friends	Nominated	
Huading Awards	2013	Best Global Actor in a Television Series	Go On	Won	
Nickelodeon Kids' Choice Awards	2002	Favorite TV Actor	Friends	Nominated	
People's Choice Awards	2016	Favorite Comedic TV Actor	n/a	Nominated	
People's Choice Awards	2017	Favorite Comedic TV Actor	n/a	Nominated	
Satellite Awards	2006	Best Actor in a Series, Drama	Studio 60 on the Sunset Strip	Nominated	
Teen Choice Awards	2004	Choice TV Actor – Comedy	Friends	Nominated	
TV Guide Awards	2000	Editor's Choice	Friends	Won (Note: Shared with Jennifer Aniston, Courteney Cox, Lisa Kudrow, Matt LeBlanc, David Schwimmer, Jane Sibbett, John Christopher Allen)	
TV Land Awards	2006	Most Wonderful Wedding	Friends	Nominated (Note: Shared with Courteney Cox)	

== See also ==
- List of deaths from drug overdose and intoxication

== Publications ==
- Perry, Matthew (November 1, 2022). Friends, Lovers, and the Big Terrible Thing: A Memoir. Foreword: Lisa Kudrow. New York: Flatiron Books. ISBN 978-1-250-86644-8. OCLC 1338841699.
