= The Whole Nine Yards (film) =

2000 film by Jonathan Lynn

- Theatrical release poster
- Directed by: Jonathan Lynn
- Written by: Mitchell Kapner
- Produced by: Allan Kaufman; David Willis
- Starring: Bruce Willis; Matthew Perry; Rosanna Arquette; Michael Clarke Duncan; Natasha Henstridge; Amanda Peet; Kevin Pollak
- Cinematography: David Franco
- Edited by: Tom Lewis
- Music by: Randy Edelman
- Production companies: Franchise Pictures; Rational Packaging; Lansdown Films
- Distributed by: Morgan Creek Productions, Inc. (through Warner Bros.)
- Release date: February 18, 2000
- Running time: 99 minutes
- Country: United States
- Language: English
- Budget: $41.3 million
- Box office: $106.4 million

The Whole Nine Yards is a 2000 American crime comedy film directed by Jonathan Lynn. It was written by Mitchell Kapner and stars Bruce Willis, Matthew Perry, Amanda Peet, Michael Clarke Duncan, and Natasha Henstridge.

The story follows a mild-mannered dentist as he travels to Chicago to inform a mob boss about the whereabouts of his new neighbor, a former hitman with a price on his head.

The film was produced by Franchise Pictures, Rational Packaging and Lansdown Films and was distributed by Morgan Creek Productions through Warner Bros. It was released on February 18, 2000. The film received mixed reviews from critics and was a financial success, grossing $106 million. A sequel, The Whole Ten Yards, was released in 2004.

== Plot ==
Nicholas "Oz" Oseransky, a likeable Chicago-born dentist from Montreal, is despised by his wife Sophie and mother-in-law. His assistant Jill jokingly asks him to name a price to have Sophie disappear. Oz meets a new neighbor and realizes he is Jimmy "the Tulip" Tudeski, an infamous Chicago contract killer with a bounty on his head.

Oz reveals Jimmy's identity to Sophie, who is intrigued. Oz befriends Jimmy, and shares his unhappiness: his business partner, Sophie's father, was involved with an underage boy and embezzled from the practice to pay off the boy's family before committing suicide, leaving Oz deeply in debt.

Oz returns home, where Sophie pressures him to fly to Chicago to share Jimmy's whereabouts with mob boss Janni Gogolak for a reward. Although reluctant, he complies.

Arriving in Chicago, Oz has no intention of giving Jimmy up. At his hotel, he meets Franklin "Frankie Figs" Figueroa, Janni's enforcer, and denies any knowledge of Jimmy, but is brought to Janni's estate. He meets Cynthia, Jimmy's estranged wife. Janni instructs Frankie to accompany Oz home and keep an eye on Jimmy until Janni and his men can take him out.

Back at the hotel, Oz calls Jimmy to warn him, but is told he already knows what he has done. Cynthia arrives and tells Oz that Janni and Jimmy both want each other and Cynthia dead to collect a $10 million trust – "the whole nine yards." Oz and Cynthia drunkenly sleep together, and he vows to protect her.

In Canada, Frankie and Oz meet Jimmy, who reveals he and Frankie are planning to kill Janni and Cynthia. Jimmy explains Sophie tried to hire him to kill Oz, and he plans to lure Janni to Montreal. Jimmy offers to kill Sophie, which Oz declines.

At work, Oz tells Jill everything. She reveals that she too is a contract killer, hired by Sophie to kill him. As Jill liked him too much, she could not go through with the hit. She demands to meet her hero, Jimmy, who enlists her help. Oz tries to warn Cynthia, who is en route with Janni. When Janni's gang arrives at Oz's house, Cynthia warns Oz that Janni will kill him after killing Jimmy. The two watch as the gang walks into the ambush.

Down the street, Sophie meets with another hitman, but when he recognizes Janni and Sophie explains the situation, he heads for the house with a gun, taking the car keys with him. Inside, Janni is distracted by a naked Jill; she, Jimmy and Frankie kill Janni and his men. Oz and Cynthia drive away as Jimmy also shoots Sophie's hitman, much to Sophie's horror, and discovers he is an undercover Sûreté du Québec detective.

As they dispose of the bodies, Oz calls and suggests a deal to benefit everyone. At his office, he alters the dead detective's teeth to match Jimmy's dental records, then sets his and Janni's bodies on fire in Oz's car. Investigators find the remains and believe Janni and Jimmy are dead.

Then, while heading to Oz's house to arrest him, they discover a recorder in the detective's car; Sophie's conversation about killing Oz sends her and her mother to prison, despite Sophie's claim that Jill is the real killer. Oz is cleared of suspicion, and Cynthia collects the $10 million, transferring it to Jimmy in exchange for her and Oz's lives.

While Cynthia and Jill, who have just met face-to-face, are at the bank, Jimmy and Frankie take Oz onto a yacht. Jill suggests Cynthia split the money with her and run, leaving Oz to be killed by Jimmy. However, Cynthia realizes she loves Oz and refuses to betray him, and Jill assures her it was a test; Jimmy wants to give Cynthia and Oz $1 million as a wedding gift.

On the boat, Jimmy confirms that the money has been transferred. He points a gun at Oz, but shoots Frankie instead, explaining that Frankie, believing Jimmy had gone soft, would have killed them both. Oz attributes the softness to Jimmy falling in love. Jill arrives and jumps into Jimmy's arms and, before he and Jill leave, Jimmy tells Oz to say hello to his widow for him. Oz, ignorant of the $1 million, asks Cynthia to marry him and she accepts. Later, the happy couple dances above Niagara Falls.

== Cast ==
- Bruce Willis as Jimmy "The Tulip" Tudeski
- Matthew Perry as Nicholas "Oz" Oseransky
- Rosanna Arquette as Sophie Oseransky
- Michael Clarke Duncan as Franklin "Frankie Figs" Figueroa
- Natasha Henstridge as Cynthia Tudeski
- Amanda Peet as Jill St. Claire
- Kevin Pollak as Janni Gogolak

In addition, Harland Williams plays Agent Hanson, while Stephanie Biddle, who performs the closing song, appears during the film as a jazz singer.

== Production ==
In April 1999, it was announced Matthew Perry would star alongside Bruce Willis in the Franchise Pictures-produced film. Perry filmed the movie in Montreal during the summer hiatus of Friends between Seasons 5 and 6. Perry said the environment was open for improvisations, with his own including more slapstick in his role, and suggesting Kevin Pollak to extend the pause in the line "something that doesn't deserve to be breathing the air." Willis had the whole penthouse of the Intercontinental Hotel for himself and would throw parties lasting all night long, with the cast and crew at times going straight to the set from them. Perry resorted to taking Xanax pills to ensure he would rest, even knowing that the tranquilizer could react badly with alcohol.

== Reception ==
=== Box office ===
The Whole Nine Yards grossed $57.3 million in the United States and Canada, and $49.1 million in other territories, for a worldwide total of $106.4 million.

The film grossed $13.7 million in its opening weekend, finishing first at the box office. It then made $9.6 million in its sophomore weekend and $7.2 million in its third.

=== Critical response ===
On the review aggregator website Rotten Tomatoes, 43% of 105 critics' reviews are positive, with an average rating of 5.2/10. The website's consensus reads: "Despite a charming cast, The Whole Nine Yards can't tickle funny bones consistently enough to distract from its sitcom-like story." Metacritic, which uses a weighted average, assigned the film a score of 47 out of 100, based on 32 critics, indicating "mixed or average" reviews. Audiences polled by CinemaScore gave the film an average grade of "B" on an A+ to F scale.

Roger Ebert gave the film one of the more positive reviews, noting in particular that the highlight was Amanda Peet's performance as Jill, which Ebert called "perfect".

== Sequel ==
A critically panned sequel with most of the original cast titled The Whole Ten Yards was released on April 9, 2004. Unlike the original film, the sequel was rated PG-13 instead of R.
