= Griffin & Phoenix (2006 film) =

- Promotional film poster
- Directed by: Ed Stone
- Written by: John Hill
- Produced by: Sidney Kimmel; Paul Brooks; Jason Blum
- Starring: Dermot Mulroney; Amanda Peet; Sarah Paulson; Blair Brown
- Cinematography: David M. Dunlap
- Music by: Roger Neill
- Production companies: Blumhouse Productions; Sidney Kimmel Entertainment; The Orphanage; Gold Circle Films
- Distributed by: Metro-Goldwyn-Mayer
- Release date: November 20, 2006
- Running time: 102 minutes
- Country: United States
- Language: English
- Budget: $500,000
- Box office: $1.4 million

Griffin & Phoenix is a 2006 American romance film directed by Ed Stone and written by John Hill. It stars Dermot Mulroney and Amanda Peet and is a remake of the 1976 film Griffin and Phoenix.

== Plot ==
The film starts with Henry Griffin (Dermot Mulroney) learning from his oncologist that his cancer has spread and that he only has one year, two at most, left to live. This discovery starts him on a journey of self-reflection which includes starting a novel and taking a psychology class at New York University. In this class, he meets Sarah Phoenix (Amanda Peet). He asks her on a date and after hesitation she comes. Then the two of them goof around and eventually stay up all night together watching the sunrise. Griffin believes they are close, but Phoenix doesn't show as much interest. Although Phoenix sends Griffin the occasional mixed signals, the two team up for a whirlwind of adventurous and almost childlike activities, such as painting graffiti on a water tower. However Phoenix doesn't want to hurt Griffin or herself by falling in love because she's too weak to deal with it as she too has cancer and is also short of time. One day while at Griffin's house after their adventure, while cleaning she comes across his books on dying and "living life to the fullest" and comes to the conclusion that Griffin knows she's ill and is being nice only out of sympathy. She storms out and after their confrontation Griffin explains that the books belong to him and he too has cancer. This causes the two to fall ever more deeply for one another, and their relationship deepens. Together, they strive to make the most of their last days of life. However while exploring and making the most of their last days, Griffin explains how when he gets seriously ill he will just leave and he wishes for her to not come looking for him because it's something he feels he must do himself. But Phoenix is first to get sick and uses Griffin's same words against him. This deeply hurts Griffin and causes him to overreact. Later, however, after realizing he was wrong, he decides he wants to spend the last moments of Phoenix's life with her anyhow. Griffin makes a last 'Christmas' for Phoenix, as it is her favorite season and it would be their last holiday together. The movie ends with two men repainting the water tower, covering Griffin's graffiti heart proclaiming his love for Phoenix.

== Cast ==
- Amanda Peet as Phoenix
- Dermot Mulroney as Griffin
- Sarah Paulson as Peri
- Blair Brown as Eve
- Alison Elliott as Terry
- Lois Smith as Dr. Imberman
- Jonah Meyerson as Kirk
- Max Morris as Andrew
- Simon Jones as Professor
- Jesse Tyler Ferguson as Student (as Jesse Ferguson)
- Susan Pourfar as Waitress
- Omar Scroggins as Movie Usher
- Adam Kulbersh as Stu Knoepflemacher
- Adriane Lenox as Doctor
- Novella Nelson as Maya Restaurant Owner
- Don McManus as Good Samaritan #1
- Jason Workman as Good Samaritan #2
- Brian Klugman as Beach Stud
- Sile Bermingham as Lilly
- Steven Randazzo as Cop #1
- Ted Koch as Cop #2
- Dana Eskelson as Mother with Stroller
- T.J. Stanton as Crying Boy
- Michael Showalter as Terry's Fiancé
- Fred Armisen (uncredited)
- John Farrer as Hospital Doctor (uncredited)
- Chuck Gerena as Water Tower Painter (uncredited)
- Pablo Hernandez as Luc (uncredited)
- Robert Oppel as Tattooed Student (uncredited)
- Kristen Silverman as Bikini Babe (uncredited)
