= Friends, Lovers, and the Big Terrible Thing =

2022 memoir by Mathew Perry

- Author: Matthew Perry
- Language: English
- Genre: Memoir
- Publisher: Macmillan Publishers
- Publication date: November 1, 2022
- Publication place: United States
- Media type: Print
- Pages: 272
- ISBN: 978-1-250-86644-8
- Website: matthewperrybook.com

Friends, Lovers, and the Big Terrible Thing is a memoir by the American-Canadian actor Matthew Perry. It was released by Macmillan Publishers (and by Headline in the UK) on November 1, 2022, a year before Perry's death on October 28, 2023. In the book, Perry details his decades-long struggle with alcoholism and addiction. Perry also details his personal life, including his relationships and time on the Friends TV series, in which he starred as Chandler Bing. The book was made available in digital, paperback, and hardcover formats, with Perry himself narrating the audiobook edition. Lisa Kudrow, who worked with Perry on Friends starring as Phoebe Buffay, provided the foreword, in which she describes Perry as "sweet, sensitive and rational".

Shortly after its release, Friends, Lovers, and the Big Terrible Thing became a bestseller on both Amazon and The New York Times charts. It received generally positive reviews from critics, with many praising Perry's openness.

The original version of the book included a controversial passage asking a rhetorical question as to why figures the likes of River Phoenix (with whom Perry worked together on A Night in the Life of Jimmy Reardon) and Heath Ledger died early, but an actor like Keanu Reeves did not. It was removed after a backlash by fans of the latter.

== Reception ==
In a positive review for The Guardian, Barbara Ellen praises Perry's openness and the fact that Perry is candid to the point where the reader might not really like him, commenting, "maybe that’s the mark of a truthful memoir."

In an interview for the Financial Times conducted with the author by Elisabeth Egan before the book came out, Perry confessed that the feeling that he might be able to help others going through experiences similar to his encouraged him to write about things he might not necessarily want to share. The interview stresses that the book was not ghostwritten.

A reviewer for the Frankfurter Allgemeine Zeitung wrote that they were surprised to find out Perry still had the stamina for romantic relationships among the difficulty of addiction and acting work.

A reviewer for Kirkus Reviews was less enthusiastic, noting that the author is "a blurter, not a storyteller", with the book itself being "strictly for Perry's fans".
