= David Rappaport =

Actor, musician, writer, director, teacher (1951–1990)

- Born: David Stephen Rappaport; 23 November 1951; London, England
- Died: 2 May 1990 (aged 38); Los Angeles, California, U.S.
- Resting place: Waltham Abbey Jewish Cemetery, Waltham Abbey, Epping Forest District, Essex, England
- Occupations: Actor, musician, writer, director, teacher
- Years active: 1971–1990
- Known for: Time Bandits (1981); Robin of Sherwood (1986)
- Website: davidrappaport.co.uk

David Stephen Rappaport (23 November 1951 – 2 May 1990) was an English actor with achondroplasia (a genetic disorder where the primary feature is dwarfism). He appeared in the films Time Bandits and The Bride, and television series L.A. Law, The Wizard and Captain Planet and the Planeteers. He was 3 ft 11 in (1.19 m) in height.

== Early life ==
Rappaport was born to Mark Rappaport and Diana Rappaport (née Schneiderman) in London. Mark was a taxi driver, and the family was Jewish. Rappaport was born with achondroplasia, a common form of dwarfism. As a child, he developed talents in playing the accordion and drums, the latter of which he played professionally at some time. Rappaport studied psychology at the University of Bristol from 1970, graduating with a degree while developing his skills as a semi-professional drummer, and acting skills at the university dramatic society.

After six months in the United States, he returned to the United Kingdom to marry his university girlfriend Jane. They had a son, Joe, and Rappaport tried to settle down to family life as a teacher. But, as his marriage broke down and he decided to follow a career as an actor, he became a resident of the squatter "nation" of Frestonia, acting as Foreign Minister under the name David Rappaport-Bramley – all inhabitants adopted the surname Bramley, so that, if the Greater London Council were to succeed in an eviction, they would have to rehouse them as one family.

== Career ==
David Rappaport first came to public notice in children's television, appearing alongside Sylvester McCoy as an O-Man in the 1979 BBC children's series Jigsaw. Rappaport and McCoy had previously appeared together in Illuminatus! at the Science Fiction Theatre of Liverpool (founded by Ken Campbell and Chris Langham in 1976). The two men also appeared in the anarchic Ken Campbell Road Show. Rappaport was with the Road Show in 1979 when it featured in The Secret Policeman's Ball. While McCoy appeared as an escapologist, Campbell introduced Rappaport to the audience as: "Not the smallest man in the world, but fucking close...". He appeared in several sketches during the first season of Not the Nine O'Clock News, which featured Langham was a regular.

In the early 1980s Rappaport played the character Shades on the anarchic Saturday-morning childrens' TV shows Tiswas and The Saturday Show. One of Rappaport's most popular roles was as Randall, the leader of the gang of dwarves in the Terry Gilliam film Time Bandits in 1981. During the mid-80s, Rappaport played in the HTV production of Robin of Sherwood (released as Robin Hood in the US) with Jason Connery as Robin. The show was filmed in Bristol, where Rappaport had a home. During this time, he also made himself at home aboard Ki Longfellow-Stanshall and Vivian Stanshall's ship moored in Bristol docks, the Old Profanity Showboat, where he often appeared on stage. Rappaport appeared in 1985's The Bride as a circus dwarf who befriends Frankenstein's monster (played by 6 ft 4 in (1.93 m) Clancy Brown). In 1986, Rappaport appeared on the American 1985–1987 NBC TV seriesAmazing Stories in an episode called "Gather Ye Acorns" (starring Mark Hamill of Star Wars fame). From 1986 to 1987, Rappaport played the lead role of Simon McKay in the American CBS television series The Wizard. Rappaport also made guest appearances on such shows as The Goodies (UK), The Young Ones (UK), and L.A. Law (US).

In L.A. Law, Rappaport played crack trial lawyer Hamilton Schuyler in two episodes. Both episodes were significant roles, opposing Jimmy Smits. The second of these, "The Mouse that Roared", was filmed only six months prior to his death. Though the Schuyler character was frequently described as "from Texas", Rappaport made no attempt to hide his English accent, which was never explained within the show.

Rappaport was the voice of Dr. Blight's computer, MAL, on Captain Planet and the Planeteers; he was replaced by Tim Curry after his first four appearances due to his death four months before the series aired. He also played Mr. Belvedere's cousin on an episode of Mr. Belvedere entitled "Duel" (Season 5 Episode 6).

== Final years, death and legacy ==
Rappaport struggled with depression later in his life. Just before his death, he had been cast and begun filming for the role of Kivas Fajo in the Star Trek: The Next Generation episode "The Most Toys". During filming, Rappaport attempted suicide, and the scenes he had completed were later discarded when actor Saul Rubinek was hurriedly brought in by producers to replace him and complete the episode. The scenes of Rappaport as Kivas Fajo were included on the Season 3 Blu-ray Disc release of Star Trek: The Next Generation.

Rappaport died by suicide on 2 May 1990. He shot himself in the chest in Laurel Canyon Park in the San Fernando Valley in California.

Two of the creators of the US television series The Wizard, Michael Berk and Douglas Schwartz, went on to produce the lifeguard drama Baywatch. In this show's fifth season is an episode entitled "Short Sighted" which originally aired on 31 October 1994. Part of this episode concerns junior lifeguard Carter McKay (Nicholas Banko), whose father Simon McKay (Ed Gale) is a namesake tribute to Rappaport's character on The Wizard.

== Theatre ==
Year	Title	Role
1971–1972	Sleep Fast, They've Landed (Everybody Wants a Frozen Donkey for Christmas)	Yellow
	Stonehenge Follies	
1975–77	Illuminatus!	Markoff Chaney
	Portland Bill Street Theatre	
	The Immortalist	Reporter/Interviewer
	Interplay	
1977	Volpone	Nano
	The Warp	
1979	Little Brother Is Watching You (Small Is Beautiful)	Himself
1979	The Secret Policeman's Ball	Member of Ken Campbell Road Show
1980	Dr. Faustus	Beelzebub, Dick, Pope Adrian, and other characters
1980	Cinderella	
1983	Exit the King	The Doctor
1985	Lulu	Schigolch

== Filmography ==
=== Film ===
Year	Title	Role	Type
1973	Turkish Delight (aka The Sensualist)	Dwarf	Feature film
1978	Mysteries	Grogard	Feature film
1979	Black Jack	Tom Thumb's Army	Feature film
1979	Cuba	Jesus	Feature film
1979	The Secret Policeman's Ball	Various Characters	TV film
1981	Time Bandits	Randall	Feature film
1981	John Diamond	Mr. Seed	Feature film
1981	Tales from the Thousand and One Nights		Feature film
1982	The Secret Policeman's Other Ball	Various Characters	TV film
1982	Beauty and the Beast	Bearkeeper	TV film
1984	Sword of the Valiant: The Legend of Sir Gawain and the Green Knight	Sage	Feature film
1984	The Gourmet	Dr. Grosvenor	TV film
1985	The Bride	Rinaldo	Feature film
1986	The Madness Museum	Ghengis	TV film
1989	Luigi's Ladies	Luigi	Feature film

=== Television ===
Year	Title	Role	Type
1973	Arthur of the Britons	Wood Person	TV series, 1 episode
1978	Whodunnit?	"Coco"	TV series, 1 episode
1978	Do You Remember?	Pedro	TV series, 1 episode
1978	The Famous Five	Mr. Wooh's Assistant	TV series, 2 episodes
1979	Not the Nine O'Clock News	Various Characters	TV series, 2 episodes
1980	Q5	Various Characters	TV series, 4 episodes
1980–1981	Jigsaw	O-Man	TV series, 12 episodes
1981, 1982	The Goodies	Robot / Chief Dwarf	TV series, 5 episodes
1981–1982	Tiswas	Shades	TV series, 7 episodes
1982	The Young Ones	Ftumch & Shirley	TV series, 2 episodes
1982	There's a Lot of it About	Various Characters	TV series, 1 episode
1983	Monaco Franze – Der ewige Stenz		TV series, 1 episode
1984	Unfair Exchanges	Arthur	TV series, Season 1 Episode 3
1984	The Saturday Show	Shades	TV series
1984	Dramarama	Luko	TV series, 1 episode
1984	Screen Two	Arthur	TV series, 1 episode
1985	The Kenny Everett Television Show	Various Characters	TV series, 1 episode
1985	Summer Season	Chimp	TV series, 1 episode
1986	Fortune Dane	Augie Briscoe	TV series, 1 episode
1986	Hardcastle and McCormick	Cluracan	TV series, 1 episode
1986	Robin of Sherwood (aka Robin Hood)	Skulley	TV series, 1 episode
1986	Amazing Stories	Ancient Tree Troll	TV series, Season 1 Episode 16: "Gather Ye Acorns"
1986–1987	The Wizard	Simon McKay	TV series, 19 episodes
1987, 1989	L.A. Law	Hamilton Schuyler	TV series, 3 episodes
1988	Hooperman	Nick Derringer	TV series, 2 episodes
1988	Mr. Belvedere	Galen Belvedere	TV series, Season 5 Episode 6: "Duel"
1989	A Fine Romance	Dr. Tomas	TV series, 1 episode
1989	Peter Gunn	Speck	Television film
1990	Beyond the Groove	Sir Harold Blandford	TV series, 3 episodes
1990-1991	Captain Planet	MAL (voice)	TV series, 4 episodes
1990	Star Trek: The Next Generation	Kivas Fajo	TV series, Episode: The Most Toys (unreleased version)
