= Manimal =

American superhero television series (1983)

- Genre: Superhero
- Created by: Glen A. Larson; Donald R. Boyle
- Written by: Michael Berk; Larry Brody; Sam Egan; Joseph Gunn; Paul Mason; Coen R. Schuiten; Douglas Schwartz
- Directed by: Chuck Bail; Georg Fenady; Daniel Haller; Sidney Hayers; Leslie H. Martinson; Russ Mayberry
- Starring: Simon MacCorkindale; Melody Anderson; Michael D. Roberts
- Narrated by: William Conrad
- Theme music composer: Paul Chihara
- Composers: Paul Chihara (pilot); Alan Silvestri (all other episodes)
- Country of origin: United States
- Original language: English
- No. of seasons: 1
- No. of episodes: 8

Production
- Executive producers: Glen A. Larson; Paul Mason
- Running time: 60 minutes
- Production companies: Glen A. Larson Productions; 20th Century Fox Television

Original release
- Network: NBC
- Release: September 30 – December 17, 1983

Manimal is an American superhero television series created by Glen A. Larson and Donald R. Boyle which aired on Fridays at 9:00 pm ET on NBC from September 30 to December 17, 1983. The show centers on the character Jonathan Chase (Simon MacCorkindale), a shape-shifting man who can turn himself into any animal he chooses. He uses this ability to help the police solve crimes.

The series ended after an eight-episode run.

== Opening narration ==
For every episode except the pilot, actor William Conrad recites the opening narration that tells of Chase's wealthy present life and his early days in Africa with his missionary father:

Dr Jonathan Chase... wealthy, young, handsome. A man with the brightest of futures. A man with the darkest of pasts. From Africa's deepest recesses, to the rarefied peaks of Tibet, heir to his father's legacy and the world's darkest mysteries. Jonathan Chase, master of the secrets that divide man from animal, animal from man. Partnered with a young police detective and the former army corporal from the fields of Vietnam, a trio that stands against the crime that breeds in the concrete jungles and stretches its deadly tentacles to the fascinating but dangerous world beyond... the world of Manimal!

== Overview ==
Manimal premiered as a 90-minute pilot that aired on September 30, 1983. The series featured the story of Jonathan Chase, a shape-shifter who could turn himself into any animal he chose, and used this ability to fight crime. Only two people were aware of Jonathan's secret, his friend Ty Earl and police detective Brooke Mackenzie. Jonathan and Ty would assist Brooke with a case she was working on, with Jonathan transforming himself into an animal when it became useful.

While Jonathan had the ability to change himself into any animal, he would transform into a hawk and a black panther in nearly every episode. In some episodes, he would transform into a third animal, such as a horse, dolphin, bear, or bull, with the transformation taking place offscreen, though once he was shown becoming a snake. In one episode, he was shown to be able to assume the aspect of various animals simultaneously, rather than adopt their forms, such as the agility and speed of a panther or the suppleness and fast strikes of a snake. The transformation sequences were designed and created by the Academy Award-winning SFX artist Stan Winston.

Another aspect of the transformations that added to the show's camp factor involved Chase's clothing during a transformation: He was depicted generally wearing a three-piece suit and tie, and the viewer would see it rip off him as he shape-shifted into an animal, though once the transformation was complete there would be no sign of his discarded clothing. A bit later, he would transform back into human form with all of his clothing perfectly restored upon his person, even if he was unconscious.

== Cast ==
- Simon MacCorkindale as Jonathan Chase
- Melody Anderson as Brooke Mackenzie
- Glynn Turman as Tyrone "Ty" C. Earl (pilot episode)
- Michael D. Roberts as Tyrone "Ty" C. Earl
- Reni Santoni as Lt. Nick Rivera
- William Conrad as Narrator (opening scene)
- Jack Greer as Young Jonathan Chase (pilot episode)

== US television ratings ==
| Season | Episodes | Start date | End date | Nielsen rank | Nielsen rating |
|---|---|---|---|---|---|
| 1983-84 | 8 | September 30, 1983 | December 17, 1983 | 90 | 10.1 (Note: Tied with The Yellow Rose) |

== Episodes ==
| No. | Title | Directed by | Written by | Original release date | Prod. code |
|---|---|---|---|---|---|
| 1 | "Manimal" | Russ Mayberry | Donald R. Boyle & Glen A. Larson | September 30, 1983 | 3-D01 |
90-minute pilot: When a group of thieves devise a plan to hijack a shipment of nerve gas, detective Brooke Mackenzie must stop them. She teams up with Dr. Jonathan Chase, a man that knows the secrets that divide man and animal and who is trained in an African technique that allows him to transform into different animals. Guest stars: Ursula Andress as Karen Jade, Ed Lauter as Colonel Hunt, Lloyd Bochner as Jordon, Terry Kiser as Charlie P. Drew, Lara Parker as Drew’s Date.
| 2 | "Illusion" | Daniel Haller | Paul Mason | October 14, 1983 | 2-L04 |
A Bulgarian ambassador hides behind his immunity status to smuggle illegal goods into the country. Guest stars: Richard Lynch as Zoltan Gregory, David Hess as William. In this episode, part of the scene on the taxi cab was later reused in the TV series Automan in season 1, episode 3 "The Great Pretender". Automan was another TV series created by Glen A. Larson. Both Manimal and Automan were being filmed around the same time.
| 3 | "Night of the Scorpion" | Daniel Haller | Glen A. Larson | October 21, 1983 | 2-L06 |
While being interrogated by Russian agents about the location of a list, a man dies from a truth serum drug. A note and $2 million are left to his daughter Terry. Jonathan, Brooke and Ty must protect Terry while trying to locate the list before the Russian agents do. Guest stars: Doug McClure as Arnold Syphes, Robert O'Reilly as Russian Agent.
| 4 | "Female of the Species" | Georg Fenady | Michael Berk & Douglas Schwartz | October 28, 1983 | 2-L03 |
After a girl is found living with wolves in the forests of Sultanpur, India, she is the topic of discussion at a local university where she is being held. When an attempt is made on her life, Jonathan takes her into his care and protection. Her identity must be found in order to discover who it is that is trying to kill her. Guest star: Michael McGuire as Stanford Langly, Laura Cushing as The Wolf Girl, Paul Haber as Punk 1, Kenny Tessel as Punk 2, Clyde Risley Jones as Punk 3, Mark Harden as Punk 4. This episode has an almost identical storyline to a 1986 episode of The Wizard titled "Endangered Species", as well as a 1994 episode of the same name in Thunder in Paradise. All three episodes were written by Michael Berk and Douglas Schwartz.
| 5 | "High Stakes" | Sidney Hayers | Michael Berk & Douglas Schwartz | November 4, 1983 | 2-L01 |
When a horse trainer recognizes her stolen horse in a race, Jonathan helps her try to recover it. Guest star: David Sheiner as Sheldon Greentree
| 6 | "Scrimshaw" | Charles Bail | Michael Berk & Douglas Schwartz | December 3, 1983 | 2-L05 |
While at the beach, Jonathan and the others discover a scrimshaw (walrus tusk with carvings on it) in the clutches of a skeleton. They begin investigating at a local bar where they encounter someone who has been looking for it for their whole life. This episode includes a new transformation sequence, in which Jonathan turns into a snake. Guest stars: Meeno Peluce as Corky Morgan, Keenan Wynn as Sea Dog Morgan
| 7 | "Breath of the Dragon" | Leslie H. Martinson | Joseph Gunn | December 10, 1983 | 2-L07 |
Jonathan, Brooke and Ty must stop a criminal who extorts money from businesses in Chinatown while posing as a superstitious icon known as The Dragon. Guest stars: George Cheung as the Dragon, James Hong as Grandfather Tan
| 8 | "Night of the Beast" | Russ Mayberry | Sam Egan | December 17, 1983 | 2-L02 |
While on a well-deserved vacation, Jonathan, Ty and Brooke get involved to thwart an attempt by a syndicate boss to illegally take over the town of Birch Hollow in order legalize gambling and build a large casino. Guest stars: Jeff Corey as Zeke Bethune, Dana Gladstone as Jack Slocum, Robert Englund as Thug, Grainger Hines as Keslo, Wayne Heffley as Osmond.

=== Night Man ===
- Glen A. Larson, the creator, briefly resurrected the Jonathan Chase character for a crossover with his 1990s series Night Man. In that episode, Manimal's traditional, practical-effects transformation was abandoned in favor of a CGI sequence.

| No. overall | No. in season | Title | Directed by | Written by | Original air date | Prod. code |
|---|---|---|---|---|---|---|
| 28 | 6 | "Manimal" | Allan Eastman | Glen A. Larson | November 9, 1998 | 206 |
Night Man allies with Dr. Jonathan Chase, a man who knows how to transform into different animals.

== Home media releases ==
Manimal: The Complete Series was released on DVD in the UK in PAL region 2 by Fabulous Films on August 27, 2012. The three-disc set includes the TV-movie pilot and seven original full-length episodes. Special features includes a near 20-minute interview with series creator Glen A. Larson, production notes, biographies, galleries, Automan TV series trailer and episode guide booklet.

Manimal was released on DVD by Condor Entertainment (3 disc set) in France on October 18, 2012.

Shout! Factory released the complete series on DVD in Region 1 for the very first time on November 10, 2015.

== Annual ==
In 1984, a Manimal Annual was released in the UK, which is a book containing stories, comics and games based on the show.

== Reception and cancellation ==
Manimal was scheduled opposite CBS's highly popular prime time soap opera Dallas. The 90-minute pilot aired on September 30, 1983; the one-hour series debuted two weeks later, but was placed on hiatus after only four regular episodes had aired, with production ceasing at that time. The show returned to the NBC schedule a month later, airing the three remaining already-produced episodes before the show was officially canceled due to low ratings on December 14, 1983. NBC's 1983 fall line-up also featured eight other series that were axed before their first seasons ended (including Jennifer Slept Here, Bay City Blues, and We Got It Made).

Manimal is not well regarded by many TV viewers and the series received negative reviews from critics. John Javna's book The Best of Science Fiction TV included Manimal in its list of the "Worst Science Fiction Shows of All Time", along with Space: 1999, Lost in Space, Buck Rogers in the 25th Century, and The Starlost. TV Guide also ranked Manimal number 15 on their list of the 50 Worst TV Shows of All Time in 2002. In 2004, readers of the British trade weekly Broadcast voted Manimal as one of the worst television shows ever exported by the U.S. to the U.K. It placed fifth on their list, exceeded only by Baywatch, The Anna Nicole Show, The Dukes of Hazzard and Wild Palms. The Ultimate Encyclopedia of Fantasy described Manimal thus: "Axed after seven regular episodes, the only surprise being that it ever got past the pilot stage".

Manimal was the subject of much sarcastic ribbing on fellow NBC show Late Night with David Letterman, including a nearly nine-minute segment called Manimal: Show At The Crossroads that aired on November 8, 1983, after it was announced that Manimal would be put on hiatus. After a detailed recounting of the show's plots, and a call to NBC headquarters to determine if the show would be brought back, a psychic was brought in to predict Manimal's future: the verdict was "nope, not on another network, not in syndication, not on home cassettes...it's a ghost, it's history, it's vapor".

Manimal had an associated toy line of solid, non-articulated figurines sold as rack toys made by Fleetwood Toy Corporation. These depicted the character in mid-transformation, such as to a cobra and to a lion.

== Film ==
In September 2012, Sony Pictures Animation was developing a live-action/CGI film based on Manimal. The series creator and producer, Glen A. Larson, was once again attached as a producer. The film was slated to be produced by Will Ferrell and Adam McKay through their Gary Sanchez Productions, and by Jimmy Miller through his Mosaic Media Group. Jay Martel and Ian Roberts have been hired to write the script. Larson died in 2014, and as of 2025, no further news of the project has emerged since its announcement.

== See also ==
- Space: 1999 (UK series that featured Maya, an alien woman with the same shape-shifting ability)
- Animorphs, a TV series adaptation of the book series of the same name
- Sheena
