= Sheena (TV series) =

American action-adventure television series (2000–2002)

- Genre: Action; Adventure; Fantasy; Superhero
- Created by: Douglas Schwartz; Steven L. Sears
- Starring: Gena Lee Nolin; John Allen Nelson
- Country of origin: United States
- Original language: English
- No. of seasons: 2
- No. of episodes: 35

Production
- Running time: 60 minutes
- Production companies: Douglas Schwartz/Steven L. Sears Productions; Columbia TriStar Domestic Television (Note: Credited as Columbia TriStar Television Distribution (2000–2001; seasons 1–2).)

Original release
- Network: Syndicated
- Release: October 7, 2000 – February 23, 2002

Sheena is an American action-adventure television series which was produced for first-run syndication from 2000 to 2002.

The series is based upon W. Morgan Thomas's comic book character Sheena, Queen of the Jungle, like the previous 1950s TV series of the same title. It starred Gena Lee Nolin and John Allen Nelson, and was developed for television by Douglas Schwartz and Steven L. Sears. In this version, Sheena was given the mystical ability to transform into almost any jungle animal; she also spoke whole sentences (akin to Ron Ely's Tarzan), unlike Irish McCalla's interpretation of the character.

== Premise ==
Sheena's parents were archaeologists who died in the jungle when she was about six years old, orphaning their daughter Cheryl Hamilton (as explained in the episode "Stranded in the Jungle"; otherwise, Sheena remembers nothing of her parents, or of her pre-Africa childhood). She was taken in by Kali, a local Shamaness of a tribe who brought her up and called her Sheena. The girl grew into a strong, beautiful woman and, five years ago, was taught how to change her shape. She can morph into most creatures of the jungle, thus acquiring their abilities, up to and including flight. She also befriended animals such as zebra Marika, elephant Chango and monkey Tiki, she can even talk to and communicate with animals just like Fluttershy can. Moreover, she becomes a mythical creature called "The Darak'na" who relies on people's fear of the unknown. For this, she covers herself in a dark liquid mud which allows her to be largely unseen in the low light of the jungle. With above-average strength, agility and speed—and armed with a pair of bone-clawed gloves—she is a formidable one-woman fighting force. She does kill sometimes.

In the first episode, she meets Matt Cutter (John Allen Nelson) who runs a safari business by air, water and land. In his youth, Cutter had a promising career as a football player till a knee injury ruined it (he has no apparent injury now). He joined the CIA, being code-named "Jericho" and fought as a mercenary. He was a first class sniper but an accident meant he killed an innocent person which caused him to abandon his old life for the life he now leads.

On their first meeting, Sheena is not sure what side Cutter is on, as she is a protector of the jungle and Cutter seems willing to do anything for money. He is unknowingly helping criminals. Over the course of the first few episodes, Cutter became more responsible, and less booze-obsessed and money-oriented. Sometimes there is chemistry between Sheena and Cutter, hinting at a development of their relationship, and at other times, the plotline appears to show a platonic friendship. This is notable in an episode where she meets an old "Agency" friend of Cutter's and a deeper level intimacy is suggested than in any of the scenes with Cutter.

Mendelsohn is a run-down buddy of Cutter's who services his plane and does odd jobs for him. The three come up against the local petty tyrant, would-be dictators, small armies, a police officer who cannot wholly be trusted, evil tribesmen, evil foreigners, people from their past, assorted traps, etc.

== Cast ==
- Gena Lee Nolin as Sheena
- John Allen Nelson as Matt Cutter

== Episodes ==
=== Season 1 (2000–01) ===
| No. overall | No. in season | Title | Directed by | Written by | Original release date |
|---|---|---|---|---|---|
| 1 | 1 | "Sheena" | Jon Cassar | Steven L. Sears & Douglas Schwartz | October 7, 2000 |
Matt Cutter is in for a life changing experience when he meets Sheena.
| 2 | 2 | "Fallout" | Jon Cassar | Bill Taub | October 14, 2000 |
An American satellite crashes near by and the information is sought after by the Russians and the troops of the corrupt president N'Gama.
| 3 | 3 | "Revenge of the Jirds" | Scott Paulin | Babs Greyhosky | October 21, 2000 |
Sheena and Cutter try to find out who's smuggling mouse-like creatures called jirds into the country.
| 4 | 4 | "A Rite of Passage" | Walter Von Huene | Babs Greyhosky | October 28, 2000 |
An ugly secret from Kali's past reemerges on Sheena's birthday.
| 5 | 5 | "Tourist Trap" | Scott Paulin | Keith Thompson | November 4, 2000 |
Terrorists steal a dangerous virus and hold Cutter's tourist group hostage.
| 6 | 6 | "Buried Secrets" | Corey Eubanks | Steven L. Sears & Babs Greyhosky | November 11, 2000 |
Sheena and Cutter are trapped in a cave while investigating an area from Sheena's childhood. And they aren't alone...
| 7 | 7 | "The Lost Boy" | Nelson McCormick | Tony Blake & Paul Jackson | November 18, 2000 |
A runaway military school student leads a tribe against N'Gama's troops.
| 8 | 8 | "Wild Thing" | Corey Eubanks | Steven L. Sears | November 25, 2000 |
Cutter and Kali must rescue a half transformed Sheena before a hunter (Henry Polic II) does.
| 9 | 9 | "Doing as the Romans" | Jon Cassar | Craig Volk | January 13, 2001 |
Sheena and Cutter go undercover to rescue a woman from becoming one of N'Gama's wives.
| 10 | 10 | "The Children of the LaMistas" | Scott Paulin | Tony Blake & Paul Jackson | January 20, 2001 |
An old enemy from the past leads Sheena and Cutter to a gene splicing nightmare....
| 11 | 11 | "Prey" | Scott Paulin | Jeff Valming | January 27, 2001 |
Sheena and Cutter try to stop a group of hunters who target endangered species, but find themselves as prey.
| 12 | 12 | "Divas of the Jungle" | Scott Paulin | Story by : Kevin Beggs & Jonathan Latt; Teleplay by : Jonathan Latt | February 3, 2001 |
Cutter is hired to guide a photographer and models through the jungle. But the photographer isn't what he seems...
| 13 | 13 | "Forbidden Fruit" | Gary Jones | Babs Greyhosky | February 10, 2001 |
Sheena and Cutter turn on each other after eating a mysterious fruit.
| 14 | 14 | "The Fool Monty" | Gary Jones | Bill Taub | February 17, 2001 |
A documentary maker ends up causing a tribal war while searching for the Darak'na.
| 15 | 15 | "Sanctuary" | Chuck Bowman | Tony Blake & Paul Jackson | February 24, 2001 |
Sheena and Cutter try to help refugees reach a sanctuary, only to get involved with a fight against the warlord's soldiers.
| 16 | 16 | "Jewel" | Chuck Bowman | Story by : Steven L. Sears & Jon Valenti; Teleplay by : Steven L. Sears | April 14, 2001 |
Sheena and a reluctant Cutter search for a tribe's pilfered jewel.
| 17 | 17 | "Friendly Fire" | Terry Inghram | Babs Greyhosky | April 21, 2001 |
Tuli, an old friend of Sheena's, find a plant which may cure radiation poisoning, but is injured by a rival.
| 18 | 18 | "Between a Rock and a Hard Place" | Terry Inghram | Babs Greyhosky | April 28, 2001 |
A corrupt tribe leader wants to own a sacred rock.
| 19 | 19 | "Tyler Returns" | Carl Weathers | Bill Taub | May 5, 2001 |
An old CIA pal of Cutter's (Peter Onorati) shows up to lead a mission to kill a terrorist responsible for the death of a friend of Sheena's. Or is he there for that?
| 20 | 20 | "Unsafe Passage" | Carl Weathers | Steve L. Sears | May 12, 2001 |
Sheena must save Kali from being sold into slavery.
| 21 | 21 | "Marabunta" | Christian I. Nyby II | Deborah Schwartz | May 19, 2001 |
Sheena and Cutter are trapped by killer ants.
| 22 | 22 | "Cult of One" | Nelson McCormick | Bill Taub | May 26, 2001 |
Sheena must prove the true evil of a supposedly benevolent cult leader.

=== Season 2 (2001–02) ===
| No. overall | No. in season | Title | Directed by | Written by | Original release date |
|---|---|---|---|---|---|
| 23 | 1 | "Rendezvous" | Chuck Bowman | Tony Blake & Paul Jackson | October 6, 2001 |
Sheena finds herself falling for an Interpol agent she's helping.
| 24 | 2 | "The Feral King" | Carl Weathers | Story by : Christopher Mack; Teleplay by : Melissa Good | October 13, 2001 |
Sheena must help a young woman find a feral young man, who in reality is the heir to a fortune, as a way of repaying her debt to his father, before hunters paid by the young man's evil uncle and the father's partner kill him.
| 25 | 3 | "Mind Games" | Walter Von Huene | Tony Blake & Paul Jackson | October 20, 2001 |
An old enemy of Kali seeks to control Sheena.
| 26 | 4 | "Collateral Damage" | Chuck Bowman | Rick Husky | October 27, 2001 |
Sheena and Cutter meet a CIA sniper being targeted for assassination by rogue operatives.
| 27 | 5 | "Meltdown in Maltaka" | Jon Cassar | Gene Miller & Karen Kavner | November 3, 2001 |
Sheena, Cutter and Mendelsohn help a female boxer with her dreams.
| 28 | 6 | "The Treasure of Sienna Mende" | Goran Gajic | Harry Dunn | November 10, 2001 |
Sheena and Cutter search for a treasure that could help a tribe afford irrigation supplies. But a treasure hunter has her eyes on the treasure as well.
| 29 | 7 | "The Darkness" | Terry Ingram | Steven L. Sears | November 17, 2001 |
Is a mystic beast responsible for several deaths?
| 30 | 8 | "Still Hostage After All These Years" | Walter Von Huene | Babs Greyhosky | November 24, 2001 |
Cutter's ex-wife is called in to negotiate a hostage situation.
| 31 | 9 | "Return of the Native" | Goran Gajic | Babs Greyhosky | January 26, 2002 |
A former love of Sheena's returns to change Maltaka's education system.
| 32 | 10 | "The Maltaka Files" | Terry Ingram | Story by : Harold Apter; Teleplay by : Tony Blake & Paul Jackson | February 2, 2002 |
Sheena and Cutter expose the truth behind sightings of UFOs, with help from Kali and Mendelsohn.
| 33 | 11 | "Stranded in the Jungle" | Carl Weathers | Carla Wagner | February 9, 2002 |
A group of explorers compete in a jungle trek challenge for five million US$, unaware that civil war has erupted in the area. One of the participants holds clues to Sheena's past.
| 34 | 12 | "Coming to Africa" | Terry Ingram | Robin Jill Burger | February 16, 2002 |
A princess who was sent to the US as a child returns for an arranged intertribal marriage with a life-view which both villages find hard to comprehend, whilst sibling rivalry simmers.
| 35 | 13 | "The World According to Mendehlson" | Jon Cassar | Tom Blomquist | February 23, 2002 |
Mendehlson is mistaken for a tribal deity when their king is poisoned, leading to the trio helping save the tribe's sacred statues.

== Home media ==
Sony Pictures Home Entertainment released both seasons on DVD in Region 1 in 2012. Season 1 was released on June 5, 2012, while season 2 was released on July 3, 2012. These are Manufacture-on-Demand (MOD) releases.

On August 15, 2017, Mill Creek Entertainment re-released the complete series on DVD in Region 1 in a 6-disc set entitled Sheena - Queen of the Jungle Collection: The Movie & TV Series.

== See also ==
- Animorphs, a TV series adaptation of the book series of the same name
- Manimal
