= Cabin Pressure =

Cabin Pressure may refer to:

- Cabin pressurization in aircraft
- Cabin Pressure (film), a 2001 Canadian film
- Cabin Pressure (radio series), a BBC Radio comedy series
- Cabin Pressure (Dead Zone), an episode of The Dead Zone
- "Cabin Pressure", an episode of the twenty-second season of Family Guy
