= The Wizard (TV series) =

- Genre: Action-adventure
- Created by: Michael Berk; Douglas Schwartz; Paul B. Radin
- Written by: Michael Berk; Douglas Schwartz
- Starring: David Rappaport; Douglas Barr; Fran Ryan
- Voices of: Frank Welker; Roddy McDowall
- Composer: Arthur B. Rubinstein
- Country of origin: United States
- Original language: English
- No. of seasons: 1
- No. of episodes: 19

Production
- Executive producers: Michael Berk; Douglas Schwartz
- Running time: 1 hour
- Production companies: BSR Productions; 20th Century Fox Television

Original release
- Network: CBS
- Release: September 9, 1986 – March 12, 1987

The Wizard is an American action-adventure television series created by Michael Berk, Douglas Schwartz, and Paul B. Radin, that aired on CBS from September 9, 1986 to March 12, 1987, during the 1986–1987 television season.

== Premise ==
Simon McKay (David Rappaport) is a former government scientist with dwarfism who disappeared for several years after refusing to continue working on weapons. He resurfaces as a philanthropist and innovative toymaker dedicated to preserving innocence. CIC agent Alex Jagger (Douglas Barr) is assigned to protect Simon from those who wish to exploit his genius for their own purposes. They are soon joined by Simon's long time friend, Tillie Russell. Simon, Alex, and Tillie become a family unit, working together through adventure and adversity. They are opposed to Simon's self-proclaimed archenemy, Troyan. Troyan seeks revenge upon the world for his suffering from the radiation poisoning he brought upon himself, rather than take responsibility for his own actions.

== Cast ==
=== Main ===
- David Rappaport as Simon McKay
- Douglas Barr as Alex Jagger
- Fran Ryan as Tillie Russell

Gates McFadden appeared as an intended regular in the series pilot, but was replaced by Fran Ryan for the regular series.

=== Guest stars ===
- Macon McCalman as Linden ("El Dorado", "The Other Side")
- Roy Dotrice as Troyan ("Reunion", "Twist of Fate", "Trouble in the Stars")
- Cary-Hiroyuki Tagawa as Mr. Cheng ("Reunion", "Trouble in the Stars")
- Peter Kent as Poole ("Reunion", "Trouble in the Stars")

== Episodes ==
No.	Title	Directed by	Written by	Original release date	Prod. code
1	"El Dorado"	Peter H. Hunt	Story by : Douglas Schwartz & Michael Berk & Paul B. Radin; Teleplay by : Michael Berk & Douglas Schwartz	September 9, 1986	4P79
The wish of a Starlight Starbright Children's Foundation recipient to meet The Wizard sends Simon, Alex, and Darcy Stafford (Cheryl Gates McFadden) on an unexpected journey, racing against the clock to find the legendary treasure of El Dorado and the missing brother whose bone marrow could save a life.
2	"Reunion"	Peter H. Hunt	Michael Berk & Douglas Schwartz	September 16, 1986	4P01
A hidden message on a necklace brings Simon and Alex to Hong Kong to rescue Simon's friend Tillie Russell from his arch-enemy Troyan (Roy Dotrice), whom the trio must stop before he can carry out his latest destructive, deadly, get-rich-quick scheme.
3	"Haunting Memories"	Peter H. Hunt	Story by : Michael Berk & Douglas Schwartz & Kerry Lenhart & John J. Sakmar; Teleplay by : Kerry Lenhart & John J. Sakmar	September 23, 1986	4P03
Unexplainable events at a local toy store lead Simon and Alex to help the owner (Kristen Meadows). Alex realizes that the establishment was a gas station before being converted into a toy store, and that he and the owner bear a striking resemblance to a couple who was murdered at the gas station 30 years ago.
4	"Seeing is Believing"	Peter H. Hunt	Douglas Barr & Dale Kern	September 30, 1986	4P05
Simon's prototype robotic helper dog, Aegis, and his new owner (Nadine Van Der Veld) find themselves in need of rescue when mercenaries try to turn this new technology to serve their own nefarious purposes.
5	"An Inside Job"	E.W. Swackhamer	Story by : Mary Ann Kasica & Michael Scheff; Teleplay by : Mary Ann Kasica & Michael Scheff & David R. Toddman	October 7, 1986	4P06
Simon, Alex, and Tillie help a mysterious runaway (Andre Gower) straighten out his life and stop the terrorists bent on destroying an airliner with Simon's radio controlled plane, The Golden Fleece.
6	"Born to Run"	Burt Brinckerhoff	Alex Gansa & Howard Gordon	October 14, 1986	4P04
Simon and Tillie are reunited with an old friend (Leslie Jordan) whose long shot to win permanent custody of his recently orphaned niece and nephew is jeopardized by Alex's new love interest (Morgan Brittany).
7	"The Other Side"	Charles Braverman	Brad Radnitz	October 21, 1986	4P02
Alex's surprise reunion with an old friend (Bart Braverman) leads to an unwanted reunion with an old adversary (Elizabeth Savage) and the unexpected field test of Simon's latest and most innovative invention. Being left a widower from a Russian wife, Simon's friend is claiming responsibility for his 6-year-old daughter from that marriage and that she is an American by law, whereas the daughter is held at the Russian Consulate with threats that she will be spirited away to the USSR if Simon does not comply.
8	"Twist of Fate"	Peter H. Hunt	Michael Berk & Douglas Schwartz	October 28, 1986	4P07
The early morning vision of a friend and mentor (Viveca Lindfors) in mortal danger sends Simon and Alex on a treacherous journey across the Himalayan mountains to cross paths once again with Troyan, and the possible fruition of Simon's other vision - his own fiery death.
9	"Nobody's Perfect"	E.W. Swackhamer	Rick Mittleman	November 8, 1986	4P08
Simon inadvertently discovers the cure for Inventor's Block when he must rescue his best inventing buddy (Avery Schreiber) from the clutches of a mobster (Al Ruscio) bent on using a garbage eradicating machine to destroy incriminating evidence.
10	"It Takes a Chimp"	E.W. Swackhamer	Story by : Michael Berk & Douglas Schwartz; Teleplay by : Michael Berk & Douglas Schwartz & Jeff Kincaid & Brad Radnitz	November 15, 1986	4P09
A mysterious coin, a new chimpanzee friend, and a run-in with a member of nobility (Sarah Douglas) who is anything but noble brings Tillie some unwanted and unexpected adventures, teaching her a valuable lesson about pre-judging others and herself.
11	"Endangered Species"	Peter H. Hunt	Michael Berk & Douglas Schwartz	December 16, 1986	4P10
Simon, Alex, and Tillie see a zoologist who has captured a feral child raised by wolves in India (Priscilla Weems) and are disgusted with how the zoologist considers her to be like one of the animals he studies. Things take a turn for the worse when a ruthless businessman tries to kill the wild girl, but she escapes into the unfamiliar environment of an American city. Simon believes that the businessman used to be a mercenary who murdered a family who were friends of Simon's, and the wild girl may be connected to the massacre. This episode has an almost identical storyline to a 1983 episode of Manimal titled "Female of the Species," as well as a 1994 episode of Thunder in Paradise also titled "Endangered Species." All three episodes were written by Michael Berk and Douglas Schwartz.
12	"Trouble in the Stars"	Michael Caffey	Story by : David Rappaport; Teleplay by : Brad Radnitz & Rick Mittleman	December 30, 1986	4P11
The circumstances of a friend's very mysterious, out-of-this-world death brings Simon in contact with a teenage scientist (Robbie Rist) so focused on finding alien communications he doesn't realize he has actually stumbled upon Troyan's latest destructive, deadly, get-rich-quick scheme.
13	"The Heart of a Dancer"	Peter H. Hunt	Teleplay by : Deborah Zoe Dawson & Victoria Johns and Michael Berk & Douglas Schwartz; Story by : Brad Radnitz & Deborah Zoe Dawson & Victoria Johns and Michael Berk & Douglas Schwartz	January 6, 1987	4P12
When a dancer (Marine Jahan) is permanently paralyzed by a stalker's (Chris MacDonald) bullet, Simon, Alex, and Tillie help her to recover, grieve, take control of her new life, and stop her would-be assassin before he can finish the job.
14	"Never Give Up"	Don Weis	Michael Berk & Douglas Schwartz	January 20, 1987	4P13
The Wizard's board game Never Give Up inspires a determined young boy's (Kenny Morrison) initiative to seek Simon's help in freeing his isolated tribal community from the clutches of a drug dealer (Jud Omen) and his gang.
15	"Daydream Believer"	Peter H. Hunt	Story by : Gabe Torres & John Whelpley; Teleplay by : John Whelpley	January 27, 1987	4P14
A boy (Trey Ames) with an overactive imagination seeks out The Wizard to help him stop a Soviet plot to destroy a missile being tested at a nearby military base. But who really is the one letting their imagination run away with them?
16	"Gypsies, Tramps and Thieves"	Marc Daniels	Story by : Jonathan Glassner; Teleplay by : Jonathan Glassner & Michael Berk & Douglas Schwartz	February 3, 1987	4P15
Tillie must face her fear of superstitions and call on her experience as a fortune teller to help Simon and Alex rescue and reunite a girl and her twin sister (Natalie Gregory in a dual role) who have never met, but communicate through visions.
17	"The Aztec Dagger"	Peter H. Hunt	Story by : Michael Cassutt; Teleplay by : John Whelpley & Michael Cassutt	February 19, 1987	4P16
When Simon's hero and inspiration (Stewart Granger) suddenly turns up — a shell of his former self — Simon and Tillie soon find themselves in the Lost Temple of the Sun one step ahead of a crooked art collector (Roy Brocksmith) to return a stolen dagger, lift a curse, and help a hero regain his self-esteem and self-worth.
18	"Papa Simon"	Michael Caffey	Story by : Arthur Bernard Lewis; Teleplay by : Michael Berk & Douglas Schwartz & Jonathan Glassner & Arthur Bernard Lewis	March 5, 1987	4P17
A baby left on the doorstep brings 'Uncle' Alex and 'Papa' Simon a series of new adventures, including saving the infant's teenage parents from the clutches of a ruthless businessman looking to sell the baby for profit, and helping the young family find their way back home.
19	"H.E.N.R.I. VIII"	Peter H. Hunt	Steven Barnes	March 12, 1987	4P18
Simon must race against the clock and risk his own life to save the life of the robot he created and discover who is trying to frame H.E.N.R.I. (voice of Roddy McDowall) for murder before they kill again.

== Save the Wizard Campaign ==
Midway through the first season Michael Berk and Douglas Schwartz received word from 20th Century Fox Television that The Wizard was being abruptly canceled. Rather than simply accept this, Berk and Schwartz worked to obtain a guarantee of the series' filming continuance through the end of the season.

Immediately following this incident, Berk and Schwartz created the Save the Wizard Campaign. This campaign included making personal phone calls and sending out letters and special flyers asking fans of The Wizard to write in to the CBS Television executive office to tell what the show meant to them, as well as asking them to send letter copies to The Wizard's administrative office. Letters and petitions poured in from all over the United States and Canada. School children and families sent in letters collectively, while adults collected signatures.

Despite the ambitious campaign, the studio executives did not change their minds regarding the cancellation. The series has yet to be released on DVD despite some fan attempts.
