= Assault on Devil's Island =

1997 television film directed by Jon Cassar

- Original key art
- Genre: Action
- Screenplay by: Calvin Clements Jr.
- Story by: Michael Berk; Douglas Schwartz; Calvin Clements Jr. Steven McKay
- Directed by: Jon Cassar
- Starring: Terry "Hulk" Hogan; Carl Weathers; Shannon Tweed; Martin Kove; Billy Drago; Trevor Goddard; Billy Blanks
- Music by: John D'Andrea; Cory Lerios
- Countries of origin: United States; Canada
- Original language: English

Production
- Executive producers: Michael Berk; Gregory J. Bonann; Douglas Schwartz; Terry "Hulk" Hogan (as Terry Bollea); Eric Bischoff
- Producers: Kevin Beggs; Paul Cajero; Joe Geus; Rebecca Dirden Mattingly
- Cinematography: James Pergola
- Editor: David Latham
- Running time: 96 minutes
- Production companies: Turner Television; Alliance Communications; Berk/Schwartz/Bonann Productions
- Budget: $4 million

Original release
- Network: TNT
- Release: October 28, 1997

Assault on Devil's Island, also known as Shadow Warriors, is a 1997 Canadian–American made-for-television action film directed by Jon Cassar, starring Terry "Hulk" Hogan, Carl Weathers and Shannon Tweed. Hogan and Weathers portray Navy SEALs who team up with Tweed's DEA agent to fight drug-funded mercenaries holding a sports team hostage on a Caribbean island.

Billed as a "Nitro Original", it was an attempt to spin off the popular professional wrestling show WCW Nitro into dramatic programming, and featured Hogan in a harder edged role, among an ensemble cast of action veterans that also included Martin Kove, Billy Drago, Trevor Goddard and Billy Blanks. Hogan and fellow Nitro personality Eric Bischoff were credited as executive producers. The film received a sequel in 1999, called Assault on Death Mountain.

== Plot ==
To free his drug lord employer from prison, a rogue UN agent organizes the hijack of a charter plane taking an American gymnastics all-star team to the Bahamas. A SEAL team headed by Mike McBride and Roy Brown must lead an assault on an island fort named Devil's Island, where the athletes are being held hostage.

== Cast ==
- Terry "Hulk" Hogan as Mike McBride
- Carl Weathers as Roy Brown
- Shannon Tweed as Hunter Wiley
- Martin Kove as Andy Powers
- Billy Drago as Carlos Gallindo
- Trevor Goddard as Fraker
- Billy Blanks as Creagan
- Mike White as Derek
- Christopher Douglas as Chase
- Vivienne Sendaydiego as Carol

== Production ==
Promoted as "the biggest original movie Turner's network [TNT] has attempted", Assault on Devil's Island had a budget of US$4 million. While produced by Berk/Schwartz/Bonann Productions, who were responsible for the Thunder in Paradise film and ensuing series, it aimed to reinvent Hogan as a "more serious and gritty" character than seen in the predominantly family-oriented fare he was known for at that point. The wrestler described role as a "John Wayne of the 90s". The basic premise originated from Hogan and fellow executive producer Douglas Schwartz. Hogan had a 25 percent stake in the production. Hogan credited the depth of the cast to Ted Turner, who exhibited the same competitiveness in backing the project that he had shown in building WCW's roster. While Hogan and co-star Carl Weathers both appeared in Rocky III, they never met on set, and their joint casting did not stem from that experience.

The film was shot in Miami and Key West, Florida, as well as in Nassau, Bahamas. The Tampa Tribune dated filming as taking place in July 1997. The titular Devil's Island, a military stronghold used as the villains' base of operations, was in fact Fort Jefferson, located off the coast of Key West. According to Hogan, the shoot was a smooth one: originally scheduled for twenty-four days, it was wrapped in just fourteen. Mike White was a real-life Navy SEAL. He and martial artist Billy Blanks served as production advisors in addition to their acting duties. White trained the cast for the scuba diving sequences. Blanks was Shannon Tweed's instructor. She had been training in kickboxing for five years prior to the film. Hogan wore custom-made wigs, each made at a cost of $5000.

Before the TV premiere, Hogan assured viewers that the film—which received a TV-14 rating— would feature no nudity despite Tweed's numerous softcore appearances. However, the cut seen in the home video version does include partial nudity, and was rated R for "violence and a scene of sexuality". Right after this, Jon Cassar directed Hogan again in the feature film The Ultimate Weapon.

== Release ==
=== Television ===
The film was heavily promoted on Turner television wrestling shows, and in the U.S., TNT broadcast footage of Hogan and Sting's kayfabe Starrcade contract signing from Las Vegas's MGM Grand during the film's commercial breaks. Bischoff later conceded that he would rather have reserved the event for his usual audience on Nitro, but agreed to the move to be a "team player".

Assault on Devil's Island premiered on TNT on October 28, 1997. It was a commercial success, drawing a 4.2 cable rating, equivalent to a 3.1 national rating, significantly above average for basic cable fiction programming. On Nitro, TNT announcer Tony Schiavone touted the premiere as the fourth highest rated of all time for a made-for-cable film.

=== Home video ===
In Canada, the film premiered on VHS on January 25, 1998, via Alliance Communications. It was titled Shadow Warriors. It was released in the U.S. on VHS and DVD on April 3, 2001, by Spartan Home Entertainment. Spartan reversed the order of the series' two installments, releasing Assault on Devil's Island as Shadow Warriors 2 after its sequel Assault on Death Mountain, which was retitled Shadow Warriors. This has been a source of confusion on many film resources, which mix up credits and storylines for the two features. A DVD re-issue by Echo Bridge Acquisition Corp used the correct order.

== Reception ==
Assault on Devil's Island received mixed reviews. The Baltimore Sun's Chris Kaltenbach called it "a movie for putting your brain on autopilot and watching things get blowed up real good. By those standards, it's a Rembrandt." In a syndicated article for his San Jose Mercury News and other Knight Ridder dailies, Ron Miller praised it as "a rollicking movie" and "a spirited attempt to blaze new trails in prime time" by transposing the formula of a theatrical action film to the cable market. However, he criticized the fact that female presence was limited to a sculptural glamour model.

A staunch dissent came from The Providence Journal's John Martin, who wrote in his New York Times Syndicate column that "[t]his cheapo action-adventure film was so familiar it made my eyes glaze over. All the gunplay, explosives and martial arts in Hollywood couldn't dress it up. The executive producers list Baywatch and Thunder in Paradise as credits. And it shows." Slam! Wrestling's John Powell was not impressed either, finding the film derivative of the recent The Rock. He assessed that, while passable during the raid on Gallindo's estate, the film took a nosedive in the later half with the gymnasts' kidnapping, which constituted "a laughable development".

Assault on Devil's Island has received some retrospective comparisons to The Expendables for its commando-themed storyline and its gathering of familiar action movie faces, albeit of a more modest caliber than those seen in that franchise.

== Sequel ==
The characters were considered for a regular series, to be called Shadow Warriors. On Nitro one week after the Devil's Island premiere, Bischoff claimed that Turner executives had committed to ordering the series if the feature notched a rating of 4.0 or more, which it did. According to Variety, it would have been paired with a Friday night wrestling show, although a Turner representative denied that any firm decision had been made regarding the franchise's future. Hogan, meanwhile, had disclosed to the press the "crafty" clauses he had put in his contract for the series. They guaranteed that at least two thirds of the episodes would be shot in either Tampa, St. Petersburg or Clearwater, for a local investment he estimated at $15 million. Additionally, he would not spend more than ten hours a day and four days a week on set.

Ultimately, TNT and the star could not come to an agreement regarding the series' budgeting, and the channel opted for a feature-length sequel instead, called Assault on Death Mountain. However, it was produced in British Columbia, Canada. TNT premiered the film in the U.S. on June 8, 1999.
