= Assault on Death Mountain =

1999 television film directed by Jon Cassar

- Canadian release key art
- Genre: Action
- Screenplay by: Calvin Clements Jr.
- Story by: Calvin Clements Jr. Michael Berk; Douglas Schwartz
- Directed by: Jon Cassar
- Starring: Terry "Hulk" Hogan; Carl Weathers; Shannon Tweed; Martin Kove; Gerard Plunkett; Christopher Douglas
- Music by: Ken Harrison
- Countries of origin: United States; Canada
- Original language: English

Production
- Executive producers: Douglas Schwartz; Terry "Hulk" Hogan (as Terry Bollea); Harold Tichenor
- Producer: Arvi Liimatainen
- Cinematography: David Geddes
- Editor: Charles Robichaud
- Running time: 96 minutes
- Production companies: Turner Television; Alliance Communications; Berk/Schwartz/Bonann Productions; Crescent Entertainment
- Budget: CDN$ 5.2 million

Original release
- Network: TNT
- Release: June 8, 1999

Assault on Death Mountain, also known as Shadow Warriors: Assault on Death Mountain, is a 1999 Canadian–American made-for-television action film directed by Jon Cassar, starring Terry "Hulk" Hogan, Carl Weathers and Shannon Tweed. It is a sequel to Assault on Devil's Island and, like the previous installment, was billed as a "Nitro Original", an attempt to expand the WCW Nitro professional wrestling brand into dramatic programming.

== Plot ==
Mike McBride and Roy Brown, two former Navy SEALs, and their associate Hunter Whiley, a former DEA agent, have renounced their careers as public servants to become private contractors, nicknamed the "Shadow Warriors". McBride is haunted by unexplained and traumatic flashbacks.

While browsing an FBI most wanted list that the team has been keeping around for reference, McBride finally grasps the cause of his flashbacks. He recognizes a low-level criminal named Kyle Reynolds as Dr. Sarkisian, a scientist and war criminal nicknamed the "Death Merchant" who caused the deaths of some of McBride's brothers-in-arms. McBride insists that Sarkisian faked his death and changed his appearance through plastic surgery. Whiley and Brown consult with their longtime friend Andy Powers, who has remained a government employee but joins them anyway, motivated by what he expects to be a hefty reward should Sarkisian be alive. However, they soon find out that McBride has left on his own.

McBride launches a lone wolf assault on a Middle Eastern camp controlled by fledgling terrorist Hameed Jamal, identified by the FBI as an associate of Reynolds/Sarkisian. McBride is captured by Jamal, Sarkisian and their enforcer Vlassi. He overhears that the two crime lords have forged an alliance to exact vengeance on the United States. Within 72 hours, they will launch a deadly gas attack on Seattle, using missiles sent from a hidden base in Western Canada. Sarkissian injects McBride with a poison and leaves. The rest of the crew arrives to save the day and capture Jamal. The reunited Shadow Warriors must now launch a final attack on Sarkisian's compound to cancel the missile launch, and get ahold of an antidote that will save McBride.

== Cast ==
- Terry "Hulk" Hogan as Mike McBride
- Carl Weathers as Roy Brown
- Shannon Tweed as Hunter Wiley
- Martin Kove as Andy Powers
- Gerard Plunkett as Dr. Sarkisian
- Christopher Douglas as Chase
- Eli Gabay as Jamal
- Mike White as Derek
- Lisa Schrage as Laura Berringer
- Dale Wilson as Armand Berringer
- Ron Reis as Vlassar
- Anaya Farrell as Dr. Magador

== Production ==
=== Development ===
Following the commercial success of Assault on Devil's Island, a regular series was considered but financial details could not be hashed out and TNT decided to proceed with a standalone, feature-length sequel. While the first movie was filmed close to Hogan's Tampa Bay home like many of his works, this one was shot in British Columbia, much to the star's displeasure. The film had the working title of Shadow Warriors II: Hunt for the Death Merchant, which was kept for early Canadian television showings on Superchannel. It had a budget of CDN$5.2 million, equivalent to US$3.5 million at the time.

Production was lured to Western Canada by the promise of lower salaries, which would allow more money to be put on the screen. Death Mountain was one of three shows to benefit from an experimental agreement between the BC film industry's main trade unions, enabling projects with less than CDN$4 million in salary expenses to hire at reduced rates. However, Hogan complained that a sudden rush to the Greater Vancouver area had caused those rates to soar exponentially during pre-production, leaving him unconvinced that similar results could not have been achieved at home. The supporting cast was not as deep as in the original, and mostly consisted of local actors to satisfy Canadian content requirements, although it did feature Emmanuelle Vaugier in an early bit part.

Montreal-based Alliance Communications returned to helm the sequel, and added Crescent Entertainment of North Vancouver to oversee local production. Although only co-founder Doug Schwartz was credited in the picture, Crescent still listed Berk/Schwartz/Bonann Productions, the partnership behind the first film, as a joint stakeholder in the project. Location scouting took place nine months in advance of principal photography. Alliance also handled international rights, pre-selling them at April 1998's MIPTV convention in Cannes.

=== Filming ===
Canadian press reported filming as taking place in May 1998. According to Hogan, the tentative schedule was for twenty-eight days, but as with the prior installment, Schwartz managed to cut it down to just fourteen. The Province differed slightly, quoting the shoot as lasting seventeen days. This required doing sixty setups a day on several occasions. The shoot was also marred by downpour, which further aggravated Hogan. The titular Death Mountain in fictional Grazbruck, Austria, was a composite of Grouse Mountain, for its cable car line, and Furry Creek. The Middle Eastern terrorist camp was recreated among sand piles on the east side of Richmond, and the climactic battle against Sarkisian was staged in Britannia Beach. Some interiors were shot at Bridge Studios in Burnaby.

== Release ==
=== Television ===
Assault on Death Mountain was originally slated to debut in the fall of 1998, but was delayed and eventually broadcast by TNT on June 8, 1999. As a result, it did not have its world premiere on the channel like the original did, although it was still promoted as such.

=== Home video ===
The film premiered in Canada on VHS on March 30, 1999, via the distribution arm of production company Alliance Communications. It was titled Shadow Warriors: Assault on Death Mountain. It was released in the U.S. on VHS and DVD on July 11, 2000, by Spartan Home Entertainment. Spartan actually reversed the order of the series' two installments, and released Assault on Death Mountain as Shadow Warriors, after its predecessor Assault on Devil's Island which was retitled Shadow Warriors 2. This has been a source of confusion on many film resources, which mix up credits and storylines for the two features. A DVD re-issue by Echo Bridge Acquisition Corp used the correct order.

== Reception ==
Assault on Death Mountain received mixed reviews. Mike Hugues, in his Lansing State Journal column syndicated via Gannett News Service, was largely positive, writing: "The good news is that is that this is made with lean efficiency [...] and the action is impressive. There's a macho tautness that works." However, he found fault with the film's lack of realism, adding: "The bad news is that things seem too easy. Hogan, strolling with a machine gun in each hand is a remarkably good shot; the villains remarkably bad." The Province called it "a fine example of filmed-in-Vancouver cheese" and a "cheerfully brainless stunt-fest".

Mike Duffy of the Detroit Free Press was not as indulgent, and dismissed the film as "another [of Hulk Hogan's] rock 'em sock 'em eye candy garbage dump of silly action-adventure clichés." Tom Dorsey of the Louisville Courier-Journal struck a middle ground. He deemed the film entertaining for what it was, praising a "non-stop action-packed" ride, but cautioned his readers that "[i]f you're looking for action, this is it. If you're looking for acting, forget it."

According to a 2019 publication, due to its potentially stereotypical depiction of Middle Eastern terrorists, the film was among a number of programs to be withdrawn from TNT's catalogue following an awareness campaign on the subject by minority groups.

=== Accolades ===
Year	Award	Category	Recipient	Result
1999	Leo Awards	Best Overall Sound – Feature Length Drama	Gael MacLean, Gordon Durity, Patrick Haskill, Gashtaseb Ariana, Don Harrision, Phil Hunter	Nominated

== Cancelled sequel ==
Like the original, executive producer Doug Schwartz considered this film as a potential launching pad for a 22-episode series, which would have retained Vancouver as its principal filming location. According to Hogan and WCW president Eric Bischoff, TNT instead expressed interest in a third full-length feature. Hogan turned it down, as he had not enjoyed the Canadian shoot and had not made as much money from it as he expected. However, production went ahead on another WCW wrestler vehicle, 2000's Shutterspeed, which starred Steve "Sting" Borden.
