= Heidi Mark =

American model and actress (born 1971)

Playboy centerfold appearance
- July 1995
- Preceded by: Rhonda Adams
- Succeeded by: Rachel Jeán Marteen

Personal details
- Born: February 18, 1971 (age 55) Columbus, Ohio, United States
- Height: 5 ft 7 in (1.70 m)

Heidi Mark (born February 18, 1971) is an American model and former actress. She is of Finnish descent; her father was born in Helsinki, Finland. She has worked at her father's law office and Hooters. She was Playboy's Playmate of the Month for July 1995. Prior to being a Playmate, she appeared on the cover of the April 1994 issue of the magazine.

Mark was married to Vince Neil of Mötley Crüe on May 28, 2000. She filed for divorce in August 2001, citing "irreconcilable differences".

== Partial filmography ==
- Red Shoe Diaries as Rebecca (1 episode, 1994)
- Thunder in Paradise (1994, TV series) as Allison Wilson (unknown episodes)
- Silk Stalkings as Christine (1 episode, 1994)
- The Young and the Restless as Sharon Newman (unknown episodes, 1994)
- Baywatch the Movie: Forbidden Paradise (1995) as Holly
- High Tide as Dee Dee (2 episodes, 1995)
- Married... with Children as Ashley (3 episodes, 1995–1996)
- Baywatch as a Blonde Con-Artist and Holly (3 episodes, 1995–1996)
- Weapons of Mass Distraction (1997) (TV) as Cricket Paige
- Head Over Heels as Nikki (1 episode, 1997)
- Steel Chariots (1997) (TV) as Amber
- Love Boat: The Next Wave as Cruise Director Nicole Jordan (season 2, 1998–1999)
- Hope Island as Stella Cooper (1 episode, 1999)
- Ally McBeal as Alice Gaylor (1 episode, 1999)
- Charmed as Darla (1 episode, 1999)
- 3rd Rock from the Sun as Miranda (1 episode, 2000)
- Dharma & Greg as Allison (1 episode, 2000)
- Beverly Hills, 90210 as Amy (1 episode, 2000)
- Diagnosis: Murder as Ashley Wellers (1 episode, 2000)
- Providence (1 episode, 2001)
- The Judge (2001) (TV) as Brittany Hill
- Rock Star (2001) as Kirk's Wife
- Life Without Dick (2002) as Crossing Guard Stripper
- Man of the Year (2002) as Carol
- Ocean Ave. as Jazz De Guise (4 episodes, 2002–2003)

Melissa Holliday	Lisa Marie Scott	Stacy Sanches	Danelle Folta	Cynthia Gwyn Brown	Rhonda Adams
Heidi Mark	Rachel Jeán Marteen	Donna D'Errico	Alicia Rickter	Holly Witt	Samantha Torres
