= At the End of the Day: The Sue Rodriguez Story =

- Directed by: Sheldon Larry
- Written by: Linda Svendsen
- Produced by: Laszlo Barna
- Starring: Wendy Crewson; Carl Marotte
- Cinematography: Albert J. Dunk
- Edited by: Stephen Lawrence
- Music by: Mychael Danna; Andrew Lockington
- Production company: Atlantic Mediaworks
- Distributed by: Alliance Communications
- Release date: February 12, 1998 (Canada)
- Country: Canada
- Language: English

At the End of the Day: The Sue Rodriguez Story is a 1998 Canadian television film about the life of Canadian right-to-die advocate Sue Rodriguez. Directed by Sheldon Larry and written by Linda Svendsen, the film was adapted from Uncommon Will: The Death and Life of Sue Rodriguez by Lisa Hobbs Birnie and Rodriguez.

== Plot ==
Sue Rodriguez learns that she has amyotrophic lateral sclerosis (ALS), a progressive and terminal illness that will increasingly limit her ability to move and communicate. Facing the progression of the disease, Sue worries about its effect on her young son, Jesse. Determined to have control over the circumstances of her death, she begins seeking the legal right to receive medical assistance in ending her life.

== Production ==
At the End of the Day: The Sue Rodriguez Story was produced by Atlantic Media Works and Barna-Alper Productions. Laszlo Barna and Sheldon Larry served as producers, with Larry also directing the film.

== Cast ==
- Wendy Crewson as Sue Rodriguez
- Carl Marotte as David Rodriguez
- Patrick Galligan as Svend Robinson
- Walter Learning as Justice Allen Melvin
- Al Waxman as John Hofsess
- Miko Hughes as Jesse Rodriguez
- Fiona Reid as Sandra Burtch

Politician Svend Robinson was portrayed by a different actor, but also had his own cameo role in the film as the third reporter at Sue Rodriguez's first press conference.

== Awards ==
- In 1999, Wendy Crewson won the Best Performance by an Actress in a Leading Role in a Dramatic Program or Mini-Series at the Gemini Awards.
- In 1999, Linda Svendsen won the WGC Award from the Writers Guild of Canada.
