= Mike White (Alabama) =

American actor

- Born: Columbia, South Carolina
- Website: Southpace Properties

Michael John White is an American businessman and former actor, U.S. Navy SEAL, and college football player.

White played football at the University of Alabama under Coach Bear Bryant. After being cut by the Miami Dolphins, he served in the U.S. Navy as a SEAL for 11 years, reaching the rank of lieutenant commander. He later served as a bodyguard to Bruce Springsteen and Bill and Melinda Gates.

As an actor, White guest starred in numerous television series and had small roles in films including The Fast and the Furious and We Were Soldiers. He both acted in and served as a technical advisor for the Hulk Hogan film Assault on Devil's Island, instructing actors in scuba diving.

As of 2023, he works as a real estate professional in Alabama. In 2024, he gave the keynote speech at the annual remembrance event for 9/11 first responders in Hoover, Alabama.

== Filmography ==
Year	Title	Role	Notes
1994	Bitter Vengeance	Guard #2	Television film
1994	One West Waikiki	Porter	Episode: "Dread Again"
1994-1995	Renegade	Detective Phil Todson	4 episodes
1995	Silk Stalkings	Bartender	Episode: "Pas de Deux"
1995	Ellen	Instructor	Episode: "The Therapy Episode"
1995	Baywatch Nights	Sergeant Decker	Episode: "Pressure Cooker"
1995	High Tide	Wes	2 episodes
1996	Bloodhounds	Detective #2 (Rierson)	Television film
1996	Wiseguy	Deejay	Television film
1996	Raven	Mike	
1997	Diagnosis Murder	Businessman	Episode: "Delusions of Murder"
1997	Assault on Devil's Island	Derek	Also technical advisor; television film
1998	Baywatch	Ray	Episode: "Countdown"
1999	Fleet Command	Commander John Tomlin, USN operations officer	Video game
1999	Assault on Death Mountain	Derek	Television film
1999	Pensacola: Wings of Gold	Capt. Ray Hartley	Episode: "Officers and Gentleman"
1999	Sonic Impact	Rex	
2000	Escape Under Pressure	Otto	
2000	18 Wheels of Justice	Lozano	6 episodes
2000	Power Rangers Lightspeed Rescue	Dark Suit	2 episodes
2000	Malcolm in the Middle	Wrestling Coach	Episode: "The Bully"
2000-2001	Strong Medicine	Lt. Col. Bill Fortier	2 episodes
2001	The Fast and the Furious	Night Truck Driver	
2002	We Were Soldiers	Sfc. Bob White, Mortar Sergeant	
2002	My Father's House	Sergeant Major Regan	
2003	The Hunted	Delta Colonel	
