= Baywatch (2027 TV series) =

American drama

- Genre: Drama
- Created by: Michael Berk; Douglas Schwartz; Gregory J. Bonann
- Developed by: Matt Nix
- Starring: Stephen Amell; Jessica Belkin; Hassie Harrison; Shay Mitchell; Thaddeus LaGrone; Noah Beck; Brooks Nader
- Country of origin: United States
- Original language: English

Production
- Executive producers: Matt Nix; McG; Michael Berk; Gregory J. Bonann; Douglas Schwartz; Dante Di Loreto; Mike Horowitz
- Production companies: Tower 12 Productions; Flying Glass of Milk Productions; Wonderland Sound and Vision; Fox Entertainment Studios; Fremantle North America

Original release
- Network: Fox

Baywatch is an upcoming American drama television series created by the team of Michael Berk & Douglas Schwartz and Gregory J. Bonann, and developed by Matt Nix that will premiere on January 6, 2027, on Fox. The series is a sequel of the original Baywatch which ran from 1989 to 2001.

== Synopsis ==
The new Baywatch finds wild-child legacy character Hobie (Stephen Amell) serving as a Baywatch Captain, following in the footsteps of his legendary father, Mitch. Hobie's world is turned upside down when his daughter Charlie (Jessica Belkin) shows up on his doorstep eager to carry on the Buchannon family legacy.

== Cast ==
- Stephen Amell as Hobie Buchannon
- Jessica Belkin as Charlie Vale
- Hassie Harrison as Nat Morgan
- Shay Mitchell as Trina Morales
- Thaddeus LaGrone as Brad Jones
- Noah Beck as Luke Matthews
- Brooks Nader as Selene Archer
- David Chokachi as Cody Madison
- Livvy Dunne as Grace

== Episodes ==
No.	Title	Directed by	Written by	Original release date
1	TBA	McG	Teleplay by : Matt Nix and Lara Olsen; Story by : Lara Olsen	January 6, 2027

== Production ==
In August 2018, Deadline Hollywood reported that FremantleMedia International were eyeing a reboot of the franchise. On April 14, 2023, Fremantle began developing a reboot of the series and held early talks with several streamers and broadcasters. On March 4, 2024, it was announced that Fremantle and Fox Entertainment would team up for the reboot series for Fox, with Lara Olsen as writer and showrunner.

In September 2025, Fox officially gave the reboot a series order for 12 episodes, which is scheduled to premiere on January 6, 2027. The reboot used a $21.1 million/40% tax credit which was awarded by the State of California's expanded Film & Television Tax Credit Program. On February 13, 2026, it was announced that Stephen Amell was cast as an adult Hobie Buchannon, who (since the original series' ending) has followed in his father's footsteps as the captain of Baywatch. That same day, David Chokachi was confirmed to appear as well, reprising his role as Cody Madison from seasons 6 through 9. In the following March, Jessica Belkin, Thaddeus LaGrone, Hassie Harrison, Brooks Nader, Noah Beck, and Shay Mitchell rounded out the principal cast, while athletic influencer Livvy Dunne was cast in a recurring role as a junior lifeguard and actor Luke Eisner was cast in a recurring role. On April 15, 2026, it was announced that Erika Eleniak will reprise her role as Shauni McClain.

On May 29, 2026, it was announced that Mary McDonnell, Michael Bergin, and Kelly Packard had joined the cast in the recurring roles as Gayle Buchannon, J.D. Darius, and April Giminski. Two months later, it was revealed Blair Redford had been cast in the role of Hunter.

In October 2026, it was announced that the series would premiere on January 6, 2027.
