= Steel Chariots =

1997 American TV auto racing film

- Title card
- Written by: Michael Berk; Douglas Schwartz
- Directed by: Tommy Lee Wallace
- Starring: John Beck
- Theme music composer: John D'Andrea; Cory Lerios
- Country of origin: United States
- Original language: English

Production
- Producers: Kevin L. Beggs; Paul Cajero
- Cinematography: James Pergola
- Editor: David Latham
- Running time: 96 minutes
- Production companies: Berk-Schwartz-Bonnan Productions; Touchstone Television

Original release
- Network: Fox
- Release: September 23, 1997

Steel Chariots is a 1997 American made-for-television sports film about NASCAR that was produced for Touchstone Television. It first aired on the Fox Network on September 23, 1997.

== Cast ==
- John Beck as Dale Tucker
- Kathleen Nolan as Ethyl Tucker
- Ben Browder as D.J. Tucker
- Heidi Mark as Amber
- Randy Travis as Rev. Wally Jones
- Scott Gurney as Brett Tucker
- Madison Michele as Melissa Bogart
- Brian Van Holt as Franklin Jones
- Heather Stephens as Josie
- Robby Pretty as Charlotte Tucker
- Jordan Williams as Glenn Walton
- Dan Albright as Rory Bass
- Craig Hauer as Trey Tucker
- Chuck Kinlaw as Willard
- Darryl Van Leer as Nate
- Andy Stahl as Crew Chief
- R. Keith Harris as Jerry
- Cress Horne as Helicopter Pilot
- Jeff Gordon as Himself
- Mark Martin as Himself
- Rusty Wallace as Himself
- Ned Jarrett as Himself
- Benny Parsons as Himself

== Production ==
The TV movie was produced as a back-door pilot for Fox Broadcasting Company.

Filming took place in Birmingham, Alabama, Charlotte, North Carolina, Concord, North Carolina, and Dallas, Texas. Filming was also done at Talladega Superspeedway.

== Reception ==
Reviewer John Martin of The Spokesman-Review wrote, "I'd call this poorly acted stock-car soap opera a cross between 'The Dukes of Hazzard' and 'Melrose Place.' Two brothers (Ben Browder, Scott Gurney) fight over who’s the better driver in the NASCAR family team. Randy Travis is downright awful as a driver-turned preacher. The authentic racing footage is the movie’s only saving grace."

Reviewer Elizabeth Blackstock of wrote, "Now, I know you can't expect a lot from made-for-TV film, but I sat down to watch this the other day, and it was kind of like watching a soap opera but made for dudes. Less than 20 minutes in, Randy Travis advises the lead character to atone for his sins and open up his heart to God, because that's how you win races. And somehow, that's not even the best part. It's terrible. I loved every second of it. I need more."
