= The Last Song (1980 film) =

- Written by: Michael Berk; Douglas Schwartz
- Directed by: Alan J. Levi
- Starring: Lynda Carter; Ronny Cox; Nicholas Pryor; Paul Rudd; Jenny O'Hara; Dale Robinette; William Lucking; Don Porter; Louanne; Ed Bernard; Robert Phalen; Kene Holiday; Ben Piazza
- Music by: Johnny Harris
- Country of origin: United States
- Original language: English

Production
- Producer: Neil T. Maffeo
- Cinematography: Robert Hoffman
- Editor: Peter Denengberg
- Running time: 96 minutes

Original release
- Network: CBS
- Release: October 23, 1980

The Last Song is a 1980 American made-for-television thriller drama film about a woman who as a result of a cover up involving toxic waste is being stalked by killers. It was directed by Alan J. Levi, and starred Lynda Carter, Ronny Cox and Nicholas Pryor. It was released on October 23, 1980.

== Background ==
=== Story ===
Carter plays the part of Brooke Newman, a young mother and singer. She has something that is the key to exposing a cover up. Somebody murders her husband. He was a sound technician who when recording some sound samples outside had recorded a conversation relating to a cover up involving toxic chemicals. She then becomes a target.

== Soundtrack ==
A single "The Last Song" by Lynda Carter was released in 1980. It was written by Ron Miller and Kenny Hirsch.

== Specs ==
- The film was the highest rated two hour CBS 2 hour movie of the year.
- VHS Release 1980
