= The Ultimate Weapon (film) =

1998 Canadian action film

- Directed by: Jon Cassar
- Written by: Paul Robert
- Produced by: Aziz Alaoui; Philippe Martinez; Murray Shostak; Danny Rossner
- Starring: Hulk Hogan; Daniel Pilon; Carl Marotte; Cynthia Preston; Lynne Adams; Michael D'Amico
- Cinematography: Bert Tougas
- Edited by: Enrique Launi
- Music by: Marty Simon
- Production companies: The John Strong Company; Betar Entertainment; Shostak/Rossner Productions
- Distributed by: Alliance Atlantis Communications (Canada); Lionsgate Entertainment (U.S. and Canada)
- Release dates: June 28, 1999 (Canada); July 4, 2000 (U.S.)
- Running time: 95 minutes (Canada); 110 minutes (U.S.)
- Country: Canada
- Language: English

The Ultimate Weapon is a 1998 Canadian action film directed by Jon Cassar, starring Hulk Hogan, Daniel Pilon, Carl Marotte and Cynthia Preston. Hogan stars as a military contractor who runs afoul of the I.R.A. when he destroys one of their weapon stashes, and must protect his family from their vengeful wrath. Coming from the producer of the similar Steele Justice, it is considered Hogan's only true foray into the type of R-rated action vehicles that many of his contemporaries essayed during the 1980s and 1990s.

== Plot ==
Ben "Hardball" Cutter, a traumatized former member of the U.S. Army Special Forces turned private consultant to the National Security Council, is called back into action by his former superior "Top" Drummond. He is to provide secret, armed support to an international U.N. Blue Berets task force during "Operation Shamrock", a peacekeeping operation in the fictional Serbian town of Trebor. The strong headed Cutter quickly butts heads with the Blue Berrets' leader, Colonel Dermot Roarke of the United Kingdom's Royal Marines. He still accepts the mission, despite the strain it puts on his relationship with his longtime girlfriend Lorrie and his daughter Mary Kate. He also gives a will for Drummond to keep in case he is killed in action. Despite his initial reluctance, he is seconded in his assignment by Vince Dean, codename "Cobra", the unassuming son of his former partner, whom he lost on the battlefield.

Dean proves his worth as the duo captures the Serbian enemy camp, where they find $20 million worth of illegal firearms and explosives. However, Cutter soon discovers that Roarke is not loyal to the U.N., and doubles as the leader of a ruthless band of gunrunners. The Colonel used them to get his hands on the weapons, which he intends to turn over to the Irish Republican Army. To avert his plan, Cutter blows up the depot housing the cargo. Back in the U.S., he confronts Drummond, who confesses to being aware of Roarke's activities and turning a blind eye to them.

Behind the respectable facade of a philanthropic entrepreneur, Irish-American Dylan McBride is actually an I.R.A. sympathizer who had brokered the Serbian arms deal. Fearing that his standing towards the organization will be compromised by the American's sabotage, he wants the affront avenged. Meanwhile, Cutter resolves to repair his family life. He asks Lorrie to marry him, and tracks down the estranged Mary Kate, who works as an exotic dancer. McBride and Roarke visit the corrupt Drummond to learn the identity of the two men who spoiled their arms deal. He gives in to their threats and sells them Cutter's will, which contains the name of his daughter. After hearing that Roarke intends to go after her, Drummond has a change of heart and tries to stop him, but he is gravely wounded by a gunshot and abandoned to a slow death.

McBride sends his bodyguard Jamie Ryan to Mary Kate's strip club, where she receives an invitation to his mansion. Encouraged by a co-worker who often goes on paid dates with older men, she begrudgingly accepts. Once there, she is isolated from her friend, and taken to a room where McBride attempts to force himself upon her, expecting that Mary Kate's defilement will lure Cutter out of hiding. During the ensuing scuffle, Mary Kate grabs onto a strange pendant the businessman wears around his neck, and flees with it. The pendant is revealed to contain an encrypted file that could cause McBride's downfall. Each looking to avenge his honor and to keep the incriminating data from the other, Cutter and McBride are now on a collision course.

== Cast ==
- Hulk Hogan as Ben "Hardball" Cutter
- Daniel Pilon as Dylan McBride
- Carl Marotte as Vince "Cobra" Dean
- Cynthia Preston as Mary Kate
- Lynne Adams as Lorrie
- Michael D'Amico as Dermot Roarke
- David Nerman as Jamie Ryan
- Vlasta Vrána as "Top" Drummond
- Kim Feeney as Jill
- Sheena Larkin as Miss Neely

== Production ==
John C. Strong was previously slated to helm The Overlords, another action film set in a steel town that would have paired Hogan with Gary Busey and fellow wrestler Roddy Piper. The film was pre-sold at the 1996 American Film Market and Cannes Film Market. Despite it being a Canadian production, the Wrestling Observer Newsletter reported that Hogan was in Los Angeles to work on the film at the end of June 1996. However, The Overlords never saw the light of day.

Strong resurfaced with a new project, The Ultimate Weapon, which was promoted at Cannes in May 1997, and for which he was announced as the director until days before filming. In the finished product, Jon Cassar—who had just directed Hogan in the made-for-television Assault on Devil's Island—received directorial credit, while Strong only received a presenter credit via his outfit The John Strong Company. A poster for the film's early German release gives Strong the possessory credit "a John Strong film directed by Jon Cassar", while the presenter credit goes not to The John Strong Company, but to Independent Film Partners, which Strong lists as another of his corporations.

The screenplay was written by Quebec writer Vincent Robert, who is alternatively credited as Vincent Paul Robert on the boxcover of a Lionsgate VHS, and Paul Robert in the film itself. The Ultimate Weapon was part of a brief period during which Hogan attempted harder edged roles than his usual family fare. As with Assault on Devil's Island, the wrestler was given a new hairstyle, this time a brush cut, as his natural balding look was apparently deemed unfit for an action hero. In a 1998 interview, the star noted that The Ultimate Weapon marked the first time his character killed somebody with a gun in his entire career. This appears to be incorrect, as he already did in Devil's Island, although this film features slightly more graphic violence.

The Ultimate Weapon was produced by Murray Shostak and Danny Rossner of Montreal-based S/R Productions for Betar Entertainment, the Los Angeles-based company of executive producers Aziz Alaoui and Philippe Martinez. The role of the other main partner, John Strong, is unclear. On his resume, he primarily mentions coordinating the film's marketing campaign. An early poster credits Les Films St-Paul, a fledgling company from Quebec producer Jean-Marc Félio, as another partner in the production. It is not credited in the film, although Félio himself is listed as post-production supervisor. St-Paul would co-produce two further projects with Betar in the following year.

While the film takes place in Serbia and the Eastern U.S., it was filmed in the Canadian province of Quebec, and features bilingual local actors Carl Marotte and Daniel Pilon in major supporting roles. Just prior, Marotte played Jeff Fahey's sidekick in another of Shostak and Rossner's productions called When Justice Fails. Pilon returned to voice his dialogue in the French dub, but Marotte did not. Longtime Hogan acolyte and fellow wrestler Brutus Beefcake (under his real name Edward Leslie) has a brief role as a thug during a strip club scene.

Filming dates are uncertain. Trade magazine Playback reported that photography was due to start on July 23, 1997. Turner Classic Movies indicates only a small delay, and lists it as taking place between July 25 and August 29, 1997. This timeframe is supported by a media appearance by Hogan, Pilon and Marotte on TVA on August 28, to promote the film which they "just finished". However, an earlier article by The Montreal Gazette said that filming was due to start in early July. This seems corroborated by a July 27 La Presse article in which Daniel Pilon recalls the shoot from the set of his following movie. The Wrestling Observer Newsletter mentions Hogan filming in Montreal in its July 28 edition.

== Release ==
=== Advance screenings ===
The Ultimate Weapon was screened for industry professionals during the February 26 – March 6, 1998 American Film Market.

=== General release ===
In its native Canada, the film was released on VHS by Alliance Atlantis Communications. The French language version, called L'ultime menace, had a street date of June 28, 1999, while the English version was available on August 3, 1999. The Alliance Atlantis video clocks in at 95 minutes. An English-language DVD was later released by Lions Gate Films Home Entertainment. It is based on the U.S. version of the film published by the same company, and lists a running time of 110 minutes.

In the United States, the film premiered on VHS and DVD on July 4, 2000, via Lionsgate's Avalanche Home Video sublabel. The boxcover lists an extended running time of 110 minutes. However, its actual length is unconfirmed and no other cut appears to be as long. In the U.K., the film was released on DVD by Prism Leisure on September 3, 2001. That version lists a runtime of approximately 90 minutes.

The film was seen internationally before its North American release. It has a German release date of July 13, 1998. It premiered on a VHS from Ascot Medien, with a listed running time of 95 minutes.

On August 27, 2021, this film has been re-released on Blu-ray in German speaking territories by the Swiss-based company Fokus Media, in partnership with the video arm of music label NSM Records, offering in a standard edition, a 24-page Mediabook available in five different covers, and an ultra limited retro-themed big box. Promoted as uncut, this version clocks in at 95 minutes.

== Reception ==
In his syndicated column for Tribune Media Services, Jay Bobbins rated the film two stars on a scale of one to four. VideoHound's Golden Movie Retriever, a publication edited by film archivist Jim Craddock for academic publisher Thomson Gale, rated it a two on a scale of zero to four. According to Hogan's autobiography, the film was profitable like his previous ones.
