= The Wild and the Free =

1980 television film by James Hill

- Genre: Adventure; Comedy; Family
- Screenplay by: Michael Berk; Douglas Schwartz
- Story by: Michael Berk; Jack Couffer; Douglas Schwartz
- Directed by: James Hill
- Starring: Granville Van Dusen; Linda Gray; Frank Logan; Raymond Forchion; Sharon Anderson; Bill Gribble
- Theme music composer: Gerald Fried
- Country of origin: United States
- Original language: English

Production
- Executive producers: Michael Berk; Douglas Schwartz
- Producer: Paul B. Radin
- Cinematography: Neil Roach
- Editor: George Hively
- Running time: 100 minutes
- Production company: Marble Arch Productions

Original release
- Network: CBS
- Release: November 26, 1980

The Wild and the Free is a 1980 American family adventure comedy television film directed by James Hill and starring Granville Van Dusen, Linda Gray, Frank Logan, Raymond Forchion, Sharon Anderson, and Bill Gribble. It was broadcast on CBS as The CBS Wednesday Night Movie on November 26, 1980.

== Plot ==
Two animal researchers specializing in chimpanzees clash when one from a staid American university campus brings his bunch of laboratory household trained chimps into the wilds of Africa and meet the other researcher's wild chimps who is studying their behaviour in the wild. Conveniently, both groups of chimpanzees coalesce into a single group. This proves vital when both researchers and the chimpanzees have to stop the illegal activities of a wildlife poacher.

== Cast ==
- Granville Van Dusen as Raif
- Linda Gray as Linda
- Frank Logan as Serre
- Raymond Forchion as Habibu
- Sharon Anderson as Lakelea
- Bill Gribble as Peter
- Joan Murphy as Rose Bower
- Bruce McLaughlin as Dean Anderson
- Fred Buch as Palmer
- Walter Zukovski as Walter O'Neill
- Jack McDermott as Barton
- Shelley Spurlock as Secretary
- Kevan North as Kevin Bower
- Sean Cunningham as 1st Boy
- Teddy Milford as 2nd Boy
- Bernard Ivey as 1st European
- Rick Rhodes as 2nd European
- Scott Earick as Poacher
