= Fleetwood Toy Corporation =

American toy company

- Industry: Toy
- Headquarters: New York City, New York, USA
- Products: Thor; Ghost Rider; Sgt. Fury; Tarzan; Buck Rogers; CHiPs; Airwolf; BJ and the Bear; Street Hawk; Manimal; The A-Team; The Patriot; The Karate Kid; American Ninja; The Lone Ranger; The Sword and the Sorcerer; The Space Sentinels

Fleetwood Toy Corporation was an American toy company based in New York City. They specialized in rack toys based on numerous licensed properties, including Marvel Comics, including the earliest Thor and Ghost Rider toy, as well as generic military toys rebranded as Sgt. Fury, Tarzan, Buck Rogers, CHiPs, Airwolf, BJ and the Bear, Street Hawk, Manimal, The A-Team, The Patriot, The Karate Kid, American Ninja, The Lone Ranger, The Sword and the Sorcerer (in conjunction with Arco Toys), and The Space Sentinels.
