= Carl Marotte =

Canadian actor

- Born: February 25, 1959 (age 67); Trois-Rivières, Quebec, Canada
- Occupation: Actor

Carl Marotte (born February 25, 1959) is a Canadian actor from Montreal, Quebec. He is a 1979 graduate of Dawson College's Professional Theatre Program and has received a Gemini Award nomination for his role in the television movie Net Worth as Marty Pavelich.

== Career ==
Marotte's other work includes roles in Lance et Compte, a leading role in Beyond Reality as J.J. Stillman, Street Legal, At the End of the Day: The Sue Rodriguez Story as David Rodriguez, Wind at My Back as Luc Gerrard, Fortier as Me. Jacques Savaria, Challenger: Countdown to Disaster as Steven McAuliffe, and Joe in Twists of Terror. In 1984, he also co-starred alongside Keanu Reeves in a homoerotic Canadian play, Wolfboy.

== Filmography ==
=== Film ===
Year	Title	Role	Notes
1980	Pick-up Summer	Steve	
1981	My Bloody Valentine	Dave	
1981	Gas	Bobby	
1981	Hard Feelings	Barnie Hergruder	
1985	Breaking All the Rules	Jack	
1995	War at Sea: U-boats in the St. Lawrence	Louis Audette	
1995	War at Sea: The Black Pit	Louis Audette	
1996	Shoemaker	Tony	
1997	Kayla	Constable Ti-Jean Chouinard	
1998	The Mighty	Doctor	
1998	The Ultimate Weapon	Vince Dean	
1999	When Justice Fails	Rod Lambeau	
1999	The Life Before This	Stan	
1999	Prisoner of Love	Trent	
1999	Who Gets the House?	Don Reece	
2004	A Different Loyalty	CIA Agent Ken Riedler	
2006	Skinwalkers	Sheriff John	
2010	Lance et compte	Pierre Lambert	
2013	A Fish Story	Mac	
2021	My Bloody Valentine 40th Anniversary	Dave	

=== Television ===
Year	Title	Role	Notes
1981	Escape from Iran: The Canadian Caper	Marine Sergeant Lopez	Television film
1983	Illusions	Whitewood	Television film
1984	Heartsounds	Michael	Television film
1985	The Park Is Mine	Santini	Television film
1985	Night Heat	Bobby Taylor	Episode: "The Source"
1985	Workin' for Peanuts	Jeff Mead	Television film
1986	He Shoots, He Scores	Pierre Lambert	13 episodes
1988	Lance et compte II	Pierre Lambert	13 episodes
1989	Lance et compte III	Pierre Lambert	13 episodes
1990	La misère des riches	Alain Gagnon	6 episodes
1991	Lance et compte: Le retour du chat	Pierre Lambert	Television film
1991	Conspiracy of Silence	Const. Mike Hall	Episode #1.1
1991	Berlin Lady	Dimitri	6 episodes
1991–1992	Beyond Reality	J.J. Stillman	22 episodes
1993	The Hidden Room	Robert	Episode: "Best Intentions"
1993	Street Legal	Ryan Greer	2 episodes
1995	TekWar	Gerrald Rhodes	Episode: "Deadline"
1995	Vents contraires	Jake	Television film
1995	Net Worth	Marty Pavelich	Television film
1996	L'histoire du samedi	Bruce Harvey	Episode: "Mayday"
1996	Devil's Food	Phil Slater	Television film
1996	The Newsroom	Cynthia Dale's Agent	Episode: "Pretty Tyranny"
1996	Taking the Falls	Richard Paxton	Episode: "Paying the Bill"
1997	What Happened to Bobby Earl?	Officer Drummond	Television film
1997	Twists of Terror	Joe	Television film
1997	Nothing Sacred	Jesse	Episode: "Proofs for the Existence of God"
1997	Psi Factor	Robert Sheffield	Episode: "The Damned"
1997–1999	Wind at My Back	Luc Gerrard	4 episodes
1998	This Matter of Marriage	Greg Cavanaugh	Television film
1998	Highlander: The Raven	Young Charlie Johnson	Episode: "So Shall Ye Reap"
1998	At the End of the Day: The Sue Rodriguez Story	David Rodriguez	Television film
2000	One Kill	Hap O'Malley	Television film
2000	Canada: A People's History	Pierre Boucher	2 episodes
2000	When Andrew Came Home	Ted	Television film
2001	The Wonderful World of Disney	Rick Bonner	Episode: "The Facts of Life Reunion"
2001–2003	Fortier	Me. Jacques Savaria	27 episodes
2002	Lance et compte - Nouvelle génération	Pierre Lambert	10 episodes
2002	Monk	Stefan Chabrol	Episode: "Mr. Monk and the Airplane"
2003	The Pentagon Papers	Charles Nesson	Television film
2003	Defending Our Kids: The Julie Posey Story	Jerry Posey	Television film
2004	Lance et compte: La reconquête	Pierre Lambert	10 episodes
2005	Million Dollar Murder	Suffolk County Police Detective	Television film
2005	Mind Over Murder	Grant Rogers	Television film
2006	Challenger: The Untold Story	Steve McAuliffe	Television film
2006	Lance et compte: La revanche	Pierre Lambert	10 episodes
2007	Abducted: Fugitive for Love	John Delaney	Television film
2009	Lance et compte: Le grand duel	Pierre Lambert	10 episodes
2010	Penthouse 5-0	Pierre Bourassa	10 episodes
2012	Lance et compte: La déchirure	Pierre Lambert	10 episodes
2015	Lance et Compte	Pierre Lambert	10 episodes
