= The Penthouse (1989 film) =

- Based on: The Penthouse by Trevor Dudley-Smith
- Screenplay by: William Wood; Frank De Felitta
- Directed by: David Greene
- Starring: Robin Givens
- Theme music composer: Peter Manning Robinson
- Countries of origin: United States; Canada
- Original language: English

Production
- Executive producers: David Greene; Steve White
- Producer: Harold Lee Tichenor
- Cinematography: René Verzier
- Editor: Parkie L. Singh
- Running time: 93 minutes

Original release
- Network: ABC
- Release: March 5, 1989

The Penthouse is a 1989 American-Canadian television film directed by David Greene and starring Robin Givens. It is based on the 1983 novel by Trevor Dudley-Smith.

== Plot ==
The daughter (Robin Givens) of a music mogul (Robert Guillaume) is held hostage in her penthouse by a twisted man (David Hewlett) from her past.

== Cast ==
- Robin Givens as Dinah St. Clair
- David Hewlett as Joe Dobson
- Cedric Smith as Commissioner Warner
- Donnelly Rhodes as Lt. Valeri
- Robert Guillaume as Eugene St. Clair

== Reception ==
Jeff Jarvis of People graded the film an F.
