= The Incredible Journey of Doctor Meg Laurel =

- Genre: Adventure; Drama
- Written by: Michael Berk; Joseph Fineman; Douglas Schwartz
- Directed by: Guy Green
- Starring: Lindsay Wagner; Jane Wyman
- Music by: Gerald Fried
- Country of origin: United States
- Original language: English

Production
- Executive producer: Ron Samuels
- Producer: Paul B. Radin
- Production location: Nevada City, California
- Cinematography: Al Francis
- Editor: G. Pat Clark
- Running time: 145 minutes
- Production company: Columbia Pictures Television

Original release
- Network: CBS
- Release: January 2, 1979

The Incredible Journey of Doctor Meg Laurel is a 1979 American made-for-television medical drama film directed by Guy Green, starring Lindsay Wagner and Jane Wyman, with a supporting cast including Andrew Duggan, Gary Lockwood, Brock Peters, John Reilly, Dorothy McGuire and James Woods. The film was originally broadcast on CBS on January 2, 1979.

== Plot ==
In 1932, Meg Laurel, a bold-spirited doctor who graduates Harvard Medical School, gives up the comfort and security of her husband, home, and her practice in Boston. Her mission is to return to her hometown in the Blue Ridge Mountains and help the Appalachian people using modern medical techniques she learned in the big city.

Meg's quest meets bitter opposition, however, by those unprepared to give up their antiquated ways for her miracle drugs. Administering medical aid to the residents of Eagle's Nest is a dramatic struggle, as Meg becomes the rival of Granny Arrowroot, a local medicine woman who is not pleased with Meg's arrival and does not trust the modern science. Tragedy nears when one man's refusal to accept Meg's methods of doctoring for his ailing daughter almost brings ruin to Meg's plans and the death of his child.

== Cast ==
- Lindsay Wagner as Meg Laurel
- Jane Wyman as Granny Arrowroot
- Andrew Duggan as Judge Adamson
- Gary Lockwood as Harley Moon
- Brock Peters as Joe
- John Reilly as Thom Laurel
- Charles Tyner as Doug Slocumb
- James Woods as Sin Eater
- Dorothy McGuire as Effie Webb
- Woodrow Parfrey as Messerschmidt
- Peggy Walton-Walker as Mrs. Slocumb
- Kathi Soucie as Becca
- Tracey Gold as Laurie Mae Moon

== Home media ==
On March 4, 2011, The Incredible Journey of Doctor Meg Laurel was released on DVD in Region 1. This is a Manufacture-on-Demand (MOD) release, available exclusively in the US as part of the Sony Pictures Choice Collection in partnership with Warner Bros. online store.
