= Jon Cassar =

Maltese-Canadian director and producer (born 1958)

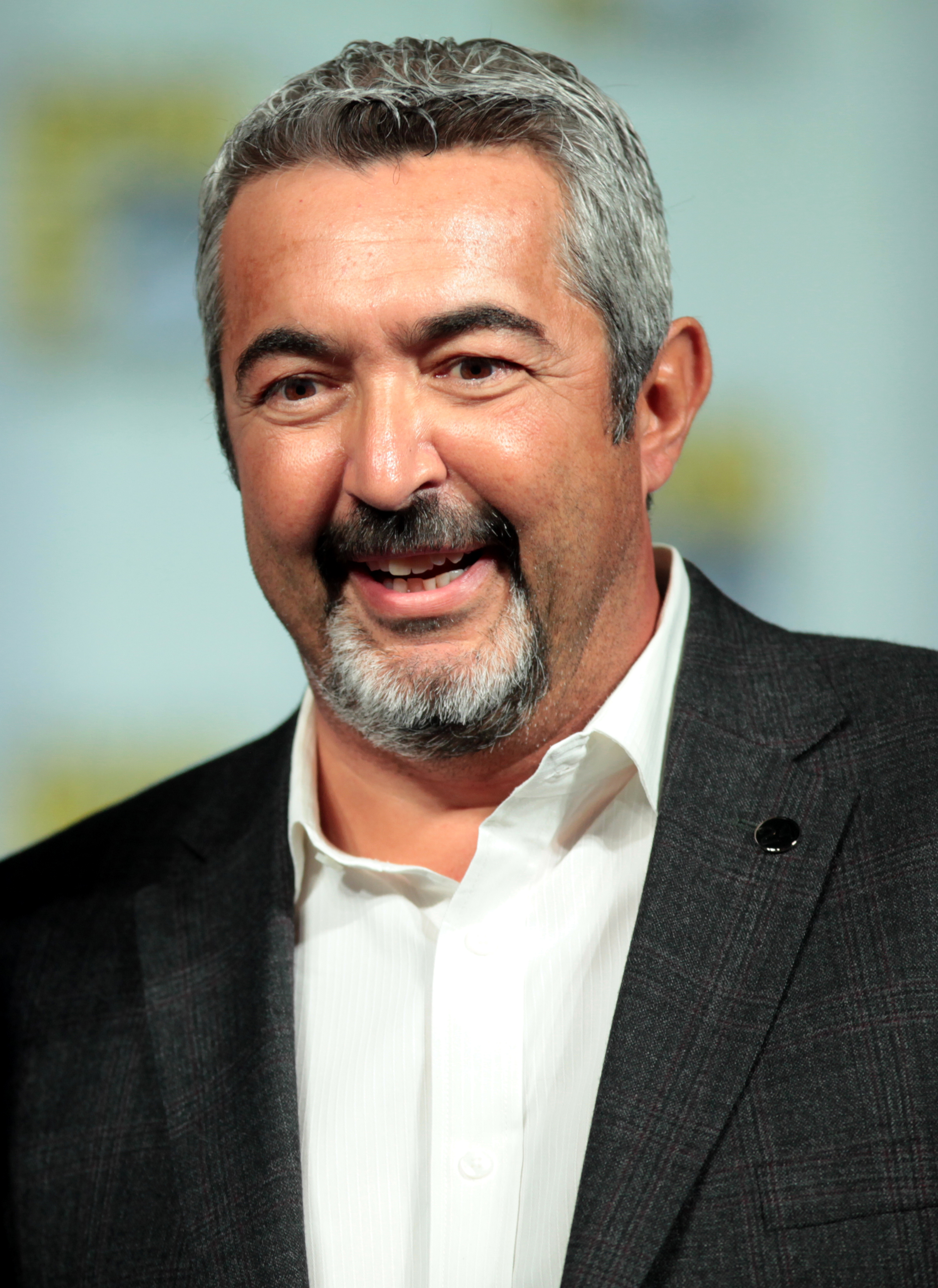
- Cassar at the 2014 San Diego Comic-Con
- Born: John Francis Cassar; 27 April 1958 (age 68); British Malta
- Education: Algonquin College
- Occupations: Director; producer
- Years active: 1986–present
- Spouse: Kristina Kinderman
- Children: 2

John Francis "Jon" Cassar (born 27 April 1958) is a Maltese-Canadian television director and producer, known for his work on the first seven seasons of 24. In 2006, he won the Primetime Emmy Award for Outstanding Directing for a Drama Series for his work on the episode "Day 5: 7:00 a.m. – 8:00 a.m.". In 2011, he produced and directed all episodes of the Canadian-American miniseries The Kennedys, for which he won the Directors Guild of America Award for Outstanding Directing – Television Film and was nominated for the Primetime Emmy Award for Outstanding Miniseries or Movie.

== Early life ==
Jon Francis Cassar was born in the Crown Colony of Malta on 27 April 1958, and immigrated to Canada in 1963 with his mother, Elda (née Segona), and father, Frank Cassar. He has two younger siblings, Bernard Cassar and Kristine Palsis. Cassar is a graduate of Algonquin College in Ottawa, Ontario.

== Career ==
After La Femme Nikita ended, for which he directed 14 episodes, Cassar began working as director and executive producer on the FOX drama-thriller series 24. In 2006, he won the Primetime Emmy Award for Outstanding Directing for a Drama Series for the episode "Day 5: 7:00 a.m. – 8:00 a.m.". In addition, he was nominated for the Primetime Emmy Award for Outstanding Drama Series four years in a row (2003–06), winning one in 2006. He directed the spin-off feature film, 24: Redemption, in 2008. Following the completion of the seventh season of 24, Cassar left the series to focus on other projects. He joined the FOX science fiction series Terra Nova in 2010, as a producer and director.

In 2012, Cassar won the Directors Guild of America Award for Outstanding Directing – Television Film and the Directors Guild of Canada Award for Outstanding Direction – Television Movie/Miniseries for his work on the 2011 miniseries The Kennedys. For producing the series, he was also nominated for the Primetime Emmy Award for Outstanding Miniseries or Movie. In 2014, it was announced that he would return for 24's follow-up event series, 24: Live Another Day, which debuted on 5 May 2014. In 2015, Cassar joined the ABC anthology series Wicked City as an executive producer and director.

== Personal life ==
Cassar is married to Kristina Kinderman with whom he has two children: photographer Zak Cassar and actor Alexis "Lex" Cassar. Zak is married to Australian singer Betty Who and Lex's wife is actress Sprague Grayden.

He is the co-founder of the Motion Picture Industry Charitable Alliance, which hosts an annual charity auction called "Lights, Camera, Auction".

== Filmography ==
=== Director credits ===
==== Television ====
- CIA (2026; 3 episodes)
- FBI: International (2025; 1 episode)
- Rabbit Hole (2023; 1 episode)
- Law & Order: Organized Crime (2023–2024; 5 episodes)
- FBI: Most Wanted (2023–2025; 2 episodes)
- Chicago P.D. (2023; 1 episode)
- FBI (2021–2025; 8 episodes)
- Medici: Masters of Florence (2018; 1st 4 episodes of the 2nd season)
- The Orville (2017–2019; 11 episodes)
- 24: Legacy (2017; 4 episodes)
- The Kennedys: After Camelot (2017; 3 episodes)
- Wicked City (2015; 8 episodes)
- Between (2015; 2 episodes)
- 24: Live Another Day (2014; 6 episodes)
- Nikita (2013; episode: "Reunion")
- Revolution (2012–2013; 2 episodes)
- Person of Interest (2012; episode: "Bad Code")
- Continuum (2012; 2 episodes)
- Touch (2012; episode: "Tessellations")
- Terra Nova (2011; 5 episodes)
- The Kennedys (2011; 8 episodes)
- Human Target (2010; episode: "Lockdown")
- Fringe (2009–2012; 2 episodes)
- Washington Field (2009; unsold pilot)
- Criminal Minds (2009; episode: "Haunted")
- Company Man (2007; unsold pilot)
- 24 (2001–2009; 59 episodes)
- The Dead Zone (2002; 2 episodes)
- Street Time (2002; 2 episodes)
- Tracker (2002; 1 episode)
- Mutant X (2001–2002; 3 episodes)
- Sheena (2000–2001; 3 episodes)
- Queen of Swords (2000; 2 episodes)
- Code Name: Eternity (2000; episode: "Death Trap")
- Psi Factor: Chronicles of the Paranormal (2000; episode: "GeoCore")
- Profiler (1999; 2 episodes)
- Amazon (1999; 4 episodes)
- La Femme Nikita (1997–2001; 14 episodes)
- F/X: The Series (1997; episode: "Medea")
- Jake and The Kid (1996-1997; 2 episodes)
- Baywatch Nights (1996–1997; 4 episodes)
- Due South (1996; episode: "Body Language")
- The Hardy Boys (1995; 2 episodes)
- Pointman (1995; 5 episodes)
- Nancy Drew (1995; 4 episodes)
- Kung Fu: The Legend Continues (1994–1996; 12 episodes)
- Forever Knight (1992–1996; 7 episodes)

==== Film ====
- When the Bough Breaks (2016)
- Forsaken (2015)
- 24: Redemption (2008)
- Danger Beneath the Sea (2001)
- Assault on Death Mountain (1999)
- CHiPs '99 (1998)
- The Ultimate Weapon (1998)
- Assault on Devil's Island (1997)
- The Final Goal Part 2: Final Goalier (1996)
- The Final Goal (1995)

=== Producer credits ===
- The Orville (2019–present; 14 episodes; Executive producer from Season 2)
- 24: Legacy (2017; 12 episodes)
- The Kennedys: After Camelot (2017; 4 episodes)
- Wicked City (2015; 8 episodes)
- Rio Heat (2015)
- 24: Live Another Day (2014; 12 episodes)
- Terra Nova (2011; 13 episodes)
- The Kennedys (2011; 8 episodes)
- 24: Redemption (2008)
- 24: Day 6 Debrief (2007; 5 episodes)
- 24 (2002–2009; 147 episodes)

=== Camera credits ===
- PCU (1994; camera operator)
- Trapped in Paradise (1994; camera operator)
- Clearcut (1992; Steadicam and camera operator)
- The Cutting Edge (1992; camera operator)
- Termini Station (1991; camera operator)
- Millennium (1989; Steadicam operator)
- The Dream Team (1989; Steadicam operator)

== Awards and nominations ==
Year	Award	Category	Work	Result
1998	Gemini Awards	Best Direction in a Dramatic Series	La Femme Nikita	Nominated
2003	Primetime Emmy Awards	Outstanding Drama Series	24	Nominated
2004	Primetime Emmy Awards	Outstanding Drama Series	24	Nominated
2004	Directors Guild of America Awards	Outstanding Directorial Achievement in Television	24	Nominated
2004	Directors Guild of America Awards	Outstanding Directing – Drama Series	24	Nominated
2005	Primetime Emmy Awards	Outstanding Drama Series	24	Nominated
2006	Primetime Emmy Awards	Outstanding Drama Series	24	Won
2006	Primetime Emmy Awards	Outstanding Directing for a Drama Series	24	Won
2006	Golden Nymph Awards	Best International Producer	24	Won
2006	Producers Guild of America Awards	Outstanding Producer of Episodic Television, Drama	24	Nominated
2007	Producers Guild of America Awards	Outstanding Producer of Episodic Television, Drama	24	Nominated
2007	Directors Guild of America Awards	Outstanding Directing – Drama Series	24	Won
2009	Producers Guild of America Awards	Outstanding Producer of Long-Form Television	24: Redemption	Nominated
2011	Primetime Emmy Awards	Outstanding Miniseries or Movie	The Kennedys	Nominated
2012	Directors Guild of Canada Awards	Outstanding Direction – Television Movie/Miniseries	The Kennedys	Won
2012	Directors Guild of Canada Awards	Outstanding Television Movie/Miniseries	The Kennedys	Won
2012	Producers Guild of America Awards	Outstanding Producer of Long-Form Television	The Kennedys	Nominated
2012	Directors Guild of America Awards	Outstanding Directing – Television Film	The Kennedys	Won
2013	Gemini Awards	Best Direction in a Dramatic Series	Continuum	Nominated
