= Harold Lee Tichenor =

Canadian film producer and writer

Harold Tichenor
- Born: Harold Lee Tichenor; January 17, 1946; Philadelphia, Pennsylvania, United States
- Known for: Cinema
- Spouse: Jessica Lippitt (m. 1967)
- Children: 4

Harold Tichenor (born January 17, 1946, in Philadelphia, Pennsylvania) is a Canadian film producer and writer and an adherent of the Baháʼí Faith.

== Biography ==
In the early 1960s, Harold Tichenor along with his brother Jim, developed an avid interest in filmmaking. Their grandfather Archie Tichenor had made films and audio visual programs for the US Baháʼí Faith community and their uncle Allen Tichenor worked as a camera technician in New York City.

Raised in Philadelphia, Harold was fourteen years old in 1960 when he and his older brother started making films. In the early 1960s, Tichenor held a number of jobs working as a land surveyor, piano technician, dairy herdsman, fish hatcheryman, draftsman and punch press operator. He attended the Walter Biddle Saul High School for Agricultural Sciences intending to pursue studies in the biological sciences in college. In 1963, while enrolled in the ecology program at the University of Alaska, he found his first paying film job as a projectionist. In 1965 he joined The Film-Makers' Cooperative in New York City, returning to Alaska that spring to work as the State of Alaska film librarian. In 1966 he was employed as a cameraman for the university and its Geophysical Institute shooting documentary film material. During the same years he worked as the director of the University of Alaska Film Group programming a series of classic and foreign films.

Late in 1966 Tichenor immigrated to Canada to work in non-fiction production. Initially, he contracted as a freelance cameraman for CBUT Vancouver and in 1967 moved to Alberta and was employed as a technician in the media department of the newly formed University of Lethbridge. Over the next five years he made a variety of science and educational documentaries for the university. In 1970–1971, he served as research assistant to John Grierson when the social documentarian was guest professor at the university. In 1972, Tichenor completed his bachelor's degree in drama and art specializing in film history and in 1974, after a year working as a writer/producer in Ottawa for the Public Service Commission’s Bureau of Staff Development and Training, he moved back to Alberta to continue his film career in the private sector.

In 1969, Tichenor had established his own film production company, Cinetel Nine later incorporated as Cinetel Film Productions Ltd., and from then to 1982 he worked in various capacities on over 100 documentaries and educational films as a cameraman, editor, writer, producer or director. His one-hour documentary, Inupiatun: In the Manner of the Eskimo , won a Rockie Award at the first Banff Television Festival and remains one of the definitive social studies of Inuit life and culture.

After 1982, Tichenor shifted from documentary to dramatic production, initially working as a production manager on half a dozen television movies, series and several feature films. In the mid 1980s, he began working as a dramatic television producer running the last two seasons of Danger Bay for CBC Television and the Disney Channel. In 1990 he and his partners, Gordon Mark, Jeff Cohen and Jayme Pfahl, formed Vancouver-based Crescent Entertainment and through that company produced programs and features for Viacom, ABC Television, Lifetime, CBC, CBS Television, Republic Pictures, Lionsgate Television and Warner Bros. In order to focus on his work as a writer, in 2003 Tichenor retired from active production and the management of Crescent Entertainment Ltd.

In addition to writing for film and television Tichenor wrote two non-fiction books on the Point blanket in the Fur Trade history, as well as numerous articles on film history and the business of film. He taught film production at the University of Lethbridge and the Vancouver Film School and guest lectured at the University of British Columbia, the University of Victoria, and Capilano University. In 1973 he was one of the founding members of the Alberta Motion Picture Industry Association, serving on its board of directors until 1979. In addition, from 1976 to 1979 he served on the board of the Lethbridge Public Library and in 1978-1979 he was vice president of the Alberta Library Trustees Association. During the 1980s, he served on several Canada Council juries, was chair of the BC District Council of the Directors Guild of Canada, served for two years on the national board of the DGC, several terms on the board of the British Columbia Motion Picture Association, and in the 1990s he served on the national board of the Canadian Film and Television Production Association and was a Canadian representative on trade delegations to the United States, China and Hong Kong. During the late 1990s he was lead Canadian negotiator representing the CFTPA in British Columbia’s industry-wide labour negotiations. From 2000-2004 Tichenor served on the board of directors of the Banff Television Festival and in 2008 completed the final year of his second term as a member of the board of governors of that festival.

Since 2006 Tichenor has been building and maintaining a private archive of studio production master tapes of primarily classical music. Drawing on its resources he has coproduced several rerelease compact discs of historic music recordings for the Alto and Parnassus labels. He is currently restoring and curating the Bartok Records master tape collection from the estate of Peter Bartok (1924-2020) in cooperation with Dr. Carl Leafstedt, Trinity University.

Although several early films made by Tichenor in Alaska are available through The Film-Makers' Cooperative the majority of his films were made after immigrating to Canada. The masters of these are archived at the Provincial Archives of Alberta, the Gatineau Preservation Centre of Archives Canada and the National Film Board of Canada.

== Filmography ==
- Terminal City (TV Series) (2005) (consulting producer)
- Iluzija (aka Mirage) (2004) (consulting producer)
- The Dead Zone (TV Series) (2002–2004) (consulting producer)
- The Dead Zone (2002) (Video) (consulting producer)
- Mysterious Ways (TV series) (2000–2002) (executive producer)
- No Boundaries (2002) (executive producer)
- The Void (2001) (executive producer)
- Cabin Pressure (film) (2001) (executive producer)
- Marine Life (film) (2000) (executive producer)
- Higher Ground (TV series) (2000) (executive producer)
- Shutterspeed (2000) (executive producer)
- Night Man (1999)(executive producer)
- Shadow Warriors II: Hunt for the Death Merchant (1999) (executive producer)
- Naked Frailties (1998) (executive producer)
- Kitchen Party (film) (1997) (consulting producer)
- Titanic (1996 TV miniseries)(1996) (producer)
- Ebbie (1995) (producer)
- When the Vows Break (1995) (producer)
- Beauty's Revenge (1995) (consulting producer)
- She Stood Alone: The Tailhook Scandal (1995) (producer)
- Children of the Dust (TV miniseries)(1995) (producer)
- The NeverEnding Story III (1994) (line producer)
- My Name Is Kate (1994) (producer)
- Frostfire (1994) (producer)
- Other Women's Children (1993) (producer)
- Lightning Force (1991–1992) (producer)
- Kurt Vonnegut's Monkey House (1991) (executive producer)
- Showdown at Williams Creek (aka The Legend of Kootenai Brown) (1991) (producer)
- The NeverEnding Story II: The Next Chapter (1990) (consulting producer)
- Danger Bay (1988–1990) (supervising producer)
- The Penthouse (1989) (producer)
- Live Wires (1989) (producer)
- Maigret (1988) (consulting producer)
- The Last Wild Salmon (1988) (executive producer)
- Danger Bay (1985–1988) (production manager)
- Home Is Where the Hart Is (1987) (production manager)
- After the Promise (1987) (production supervisor)
- Vanishing Act (1986) (production manager)
- To Kill a Whopping Bird (1985) (producer/director)
- Unendliche Geschichte, Die (aka The NeverEnding Story) (1984) (production manager: location unit)
- Free to Fly (1984) (associate producer)
- Latitude 55° (1982) (associate producer/production manager)
- New Day - New Horizon (1982) (producer)
- Pilots North (1982) (producer)
- Be What You Are (1982) (director)
- Sky's the Limit (1982) (director)
- Driving's Only Half the Battle (1981) (director)
- Solutions: Canadian Transit Technology (1981) (director)
- Do It Right Every Time (1980) (director)
- Inupiatun: In the Manner of the Eskimo (1980) (writer/producer/director)
- Mark of the Professional (1980) (director)
- A Place Apart (1980) (director)
- Safety Is My Business (1980) (director)
- Switches, Wires and Poles (1980) (director)
- The Calgary Story (1979) (director)
- Lakeside Habitat (1979) (director)
- Loons of Amisk (1979) (director)
- Osprey's Domain (1979) (director)
- The Force (1979) (producer)
- Avalanche Rescue (1978) (director)
- Below the Ramparts (1978) (director)
- Boreal Forest: Fall and Winter (1978) (director)
- Boreal Forest: Spring and Summer (1978) (director)
- Gyros: Handle with Care (1978) (producer/director)
- The Snow War (1978) (writer/producer/director)
- Three Rivers (1978) (director)
- Edmonton Art Gallery (1977) (director)
- Katei Seikatsu: Japanese Family Life (1976) (producer/director)
- The Magic of Water (1975) (director)
- Chief Dan George Speaks (1974) (codirector/editor)
- Concerto for Water, Sun and Wilderness (1972) (director)
- Together (1972) (director)
- Bharata Natyam (1971) (director)
- Three Very Short Films (1967–1971) (director)
- Yard Limit (1970) (codirector)
- Life Cycle of Leucochloridium variae (1969) (director) - about Leucochloridium variae parasite
- Omochi (1968)
- Four Passes of the Invisible Hand (1966) (director)

== Discography ==
- Stravinsky Conducts Columbia 1960/1/ Parnassus (2021) (Coproducer/Digitization)
- Larrocha de Falla Nights in the Garden of Spain Hispavox 1958/9/ Alto (2021)(Coproducer/Digitization)
- John Coltrane Giant Steps & My Favorite Things Atlantic 1960/1/ Alto (2021)(Coproducer/Digitization)
- Rubinstein/Szeryng Brahms Violin Sonatas RCA 1960/ Parnassus (2021)(Coproducer/Digitization)
- Daniil Shafran Cello Masterworks Melodiya RCA 1961/ Parnassus (2022) (Coproducer/Digitization)

== Bibliography ==
- The Blanket: an Illustrated History of the Hudson's Bay Blanket (HBC/Quantum Press, Toronto, 2002)
- The Collector's Guide to Point Blankets (Cinetel, Bowen Island, 2003)
- Stereo Photography and the Leitz Stemar (The Viewfinder Vol 31 No 3 Pages 17-22, Leica Historical Society of America, Fall 1998)
- Audio Tape: An Introduction to Analogue Magnetic Tape Recorders for Archivists and Audiophiles (ARSC Journal Vol 56 No 2 Pages 213-253, Association for Recorded Sound Archives, Fall 2025)
