= Douglas Schwartz =

American television screenwriter and series creator

- Occupations: Screenwriter, producer
- Notable work: The Wizard; Baywatch
- Relatives: Sherwood Schwartz (uncle); Michael Berk (cousin)

Douglas Schwartz is an American television screenwriter and series creator who, along with Michael Berk, worked as a writer on the television series Manimal, and multiple made for television movies. He is most famous for creating co-producing, and writing The Wizard, as well as creating and writing the earlier scripts of Baywatch, a series which exceeded a global audience of 1 billion people. He also developed Sheena, based on the comic book of the same name.

Douglas Schwartz, along with his collaborator Michael Berk, is a nephew of Sherwood Schwartz, who created the TV show Gilligan's Island.

== Screenwriting credits ==
=== Television ===
- Manimal (1983)
- The Wizard (1986-1987)
- Baywatch (1989-1992)
- Thunder in Paradise (1994)
- Sheena (2000)
- Baywatch (2027)

=== Film ===
- The Peace Killings (1971) [director, cinematographer, editor]
- Your Three Minutes Are Up [director]
- Goldie and the Boxer (1979)
- The Incredible Journey of Doctor Meg Laurel (1979)
- The Last Song (1980)
- The Wild and the Free (1980)
- The Ordeal of Dr. Mudd (1980)
- The Haunting Passion (1983)
- Crime of Innocence (1985)
- Baywatch: Panic at Malibu Pier (1989)
- Assault on Devil's Island (1997)
- Steel Chariots (1997)
- Assault on Death Mountain (1999)
- Cabin Pressure (2002)
- Baywatch: Hawaiian Wedding (2003)
- Soul Surfer (2011)

== Co-creator ==
- The Wizard (1986-1987)
- Baywatch (1989-2001)
- Thunder in Paradise (1994)
- Baywatch Nights (1995-1997)
- Sheena (2000-2002)

== Producer ==
=== Television ===
- Manimal (1983)
- The Wizard (1986-1987)
- Baywatch (1989-1999)
- Thunder in Paradise (1994)
- Baywatch Nights (1995)
- Higher Ground (2000)
- Sheena (2000-2001)

=== Film ===
- The Ordeal of Dr. Mudd (1980)
- The Wild and the Free (1980)
- The Haunting Passion (1983)
- Crime of Innocence (1985)
- Baywatch: Panic at Malibu Pier (1989)
- Steel Chariots (1997)
- Assault on Devil’s Island (1997)
- Shadow Warriors II: Hunt for the Death Merchant (1999)
- Baywatch: Hawaiian Wedding (2003)
- Soul Surfer (2011)
- Baywatch (2017)
