= Michael Berk =

American television screenwriter

- Occupations: Screenwriter, producer
- Notable work: The Wizard; Baywatch
- Relatives: Sherwood Schwartz (uncle); Douglas Schwartz (cousin)

Michael Berk is an American television screenwriter. He worked with Douglas Schwartz as a writer on the television series Manimal, and many made-for-television movies. He served as a co-creator, writer and executive producer on the series Baywatch, and is also known as the creator, co-producer, and writer of the television series The Wizard.

== Screenwriting credits ==
=== Television ===
- Manimal (1983)
- The Wizard (1986–1987)
- Baywatch (1989–1998)
- Thunder in Paradise (1994)
- Baywatch Nights (1995)
- Baywatch (2027)

=== Film ===
- The Peace Killers (1971)
- The Incredible Journey of Doctor Meg Laurel (1979)
- The Last Song (1980)
- The Ordeal of Dr. Mudd (1980)
- The Wild and the Free (1980)
- The Haunting Passion (1983)
- Crime of Innocence (1985)
- Baywatch: Panic at Malibu Pier (1989)
- Assault on Devil's Island (1997)
- Steel Chariots (1997)
- Assault on Death Mountain (1999)
- Baywatch: Hawaiian Wedding (2003)
- Soul Surfer (2011)
- SPF-18 (2017)

== Co-creator ==
- The Wizard (1986–1987)
- Baywatch (1989–2001)
- Thunder in Paradise (1994)
- Baywatch Nights (1995–1997)

== Producer ==
=== Television ===
- Manimal (1983)
- The Wizard (1986–1987)
- Baywatch (1989–1999)
- Thunder in Paradise (1994)
- Baywatch Nights (1995)

=== Film ===
- The Peace Killers (1970)
- The Ordeal of Dr. Mudd (1980)
- The Wild and the Free (1980)
- The Haunting Passion (1983)
- Crime of Innocence (1985)
- Baywatch: Panic at Malibu Pier (1989)
- Steel Chariots (1997)
- Assault on Devil’s Island (1997)
- Baywatch: Hawaiian Wedding (2003)
- Soul Surfer (2011)
- Baywatch (2017)
