= Carl Weathers =

American actor and football player (1948–2024)

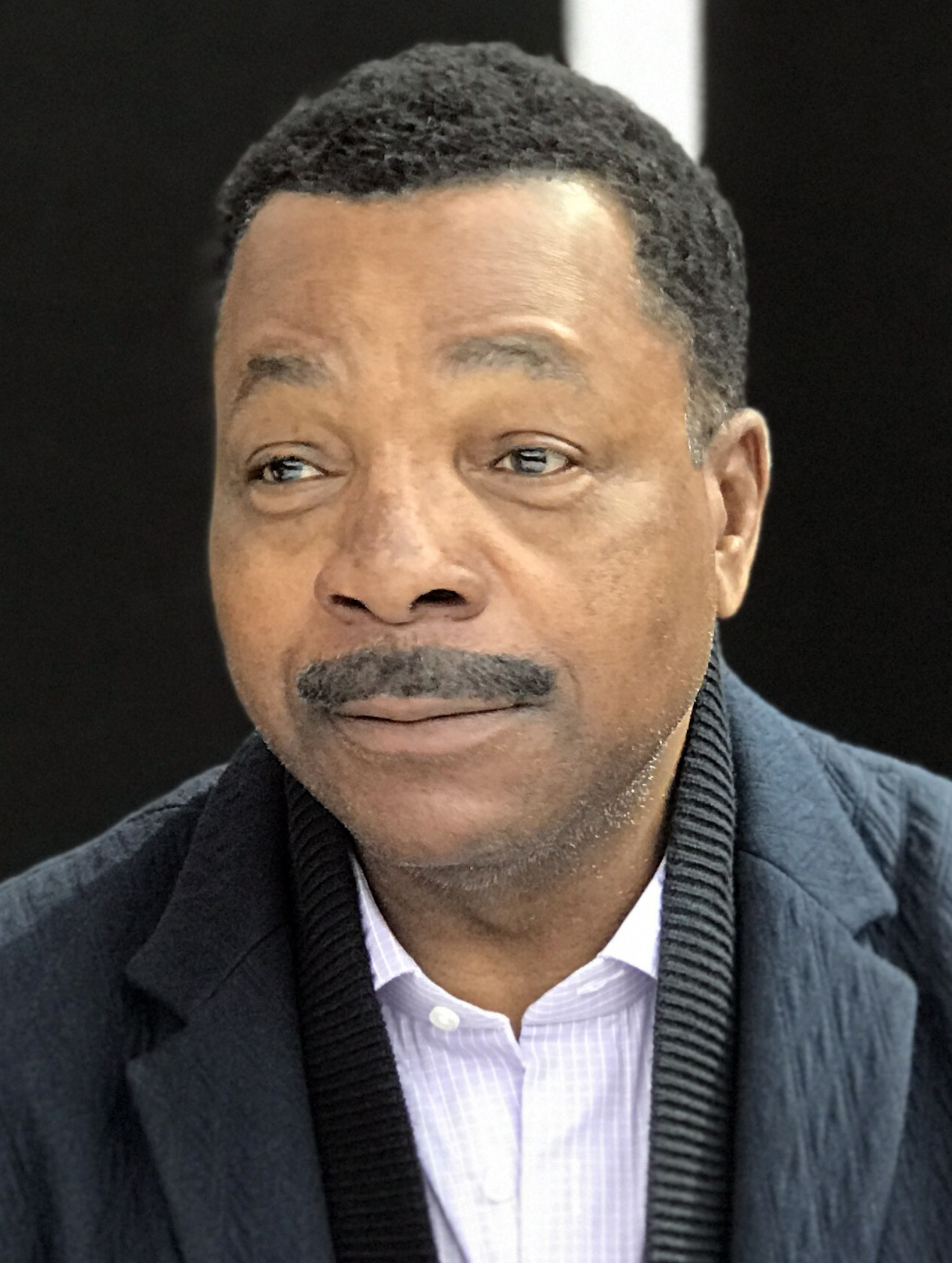
- Weathers at the 2017 New York Comic Con
- Born: January 14, 1948; New Orleans, Louisiana, U.S.
- Died: February 2, 2024 (aged 76); Los Angeles, California, U.S.
- Education: San Francisco State University (BA); San Diego State University (MA)
- Occupations: Actor; director
- Years active: 1968–2024
- Spouses: Mary Ann Castle (m. 1973; div. 1983); Rhona Unsell (m. 1984; div. 2006); Jennifer Peterson (m. 2007; div. 2009)
- Partner: Christine Kludjian (2014–2024)
- Children: 2
- Football career

No. 49, 55
- Position: Linebacker

Personal information
- Listed height: 6 ft 2 in (1.88 m)
- Listed weight: 220 lb (100 kg)

Career information
- College: Long Beach CC (1966–1967); San Diego State (1968–1969)
- NFL draft: 1970: undrafted

Career history
- Oakland Raiders (1970–1971); BC Lions (1971–1973)

Career NFL statistics
- Games played: 8
- Stats at Pro Football Reference

Career CFL statistics
- Games played: 13
- Fumble recoveries: 1

Carl Weathers (January 14, 1948 – February 2, 2024) was an American actor, director and American football player. His prominent roles included boxer Apollo Creed in the first four Rocky films (1976–1985), Colonel Al Dillon in Predator (1987), Chubbs Peterson in Happy Gilmore (1996), and Combat Carl in the Toy Story franchise. He also starred in the 1988 film Action Jackson and portrayed Det. Beaudreaux in the television series Street Justice (1991–1993) and a fictionalized version of himself in the comedy series Arrested Development (2004, 2013), and voiced Omnitraxus Prime in Star vs. the Forces of Evil (2017–2019). He had a recurring role as Greef Karga in the Star Wars series The Mandalorian (2019–2023), for which he was nominated for the Primetime Emmy Award for Outstanding Guest Actor in a Drama Series.

Weathers played college football for the San Diego State Aztecs before playing professionally as a linebacker. He joined the Oakland Raiders of the National Football League (NFL) after going undrafted in the 1970 NFL draft. After two seasons with the Raiders, he played three seasons with the BC Lions of the Canadian Football League (CFL).

== Early life ==
Weathers was born on January 14, 1948, in New Orleans, Louisiana. His father was a day laborer. As an eighth-grade student, Weathers earned an athletic scholarship to St. Augustine High School, a private school. He was an all-around athlete, involved in boxing, football, gymnastics, judo, soccer, and wrestling and he graduated from Long Beach Poly High School in 1966.

== College football career ==
Weathers played football as a defensive end in college. He started his college career in 1966 at Long Beach City College, where he did not play in 1966 due to an ankle injury suffered when he tripped over a curb surrounding the running track while warming up for practice with another linebacker. He then transferred and played for San Diego State University, becoming a letterman for the San Diego State Aztecs in 1968 and 1969, helping the Aztecs win the 1969 Pasadena Bowl, finishing with an 11–0 record, and a No. 18 ranking in the Final UPI Poll, playing for head coach Don Coryell. At San Diego State, Weathers—who considered acting his first love and had been performing in plays even back in grade school—received a master in theatre arts.

== Professional football career ==
Weathers signed with the Oakland Raiders of the NFL as an undrafted free agent in 1970. Now playing as a linebacker, Weathers played in seven games for the Raiders in 1970, helping them win the AFC West Division title, on their way to the first-ever AFC Championship Game. Before the 1971 season, Weathers converted to the position of strong safety. He played in one game of the 1971 NFL season before the Raiders released him in September 1971, after head coach John Madden told Weathers, "You're just too sensitive."

Later that month, Weathers signed with the BC Lions of the CFL. He played for the Lions until 1973, playing 13 games in total. During the off-seasons, Weathers attended San Francisco State University and earned a bachelor's degree in drama in 1974.

Weathers retired from football in 1974, and began pursuing an acting career. In his NFL career he appeared in 8 games in two seasons, but did not record any stats. The only stat he recorded in his CFL career was a single fumble recovery. In later years, Weathers narrated NFL Films' season recap of the 1999, 2000 and 2001 seasons. During the 2017 NFL draft, he appeared on NFL Network's pre-draft coverage.

== Acting career ==
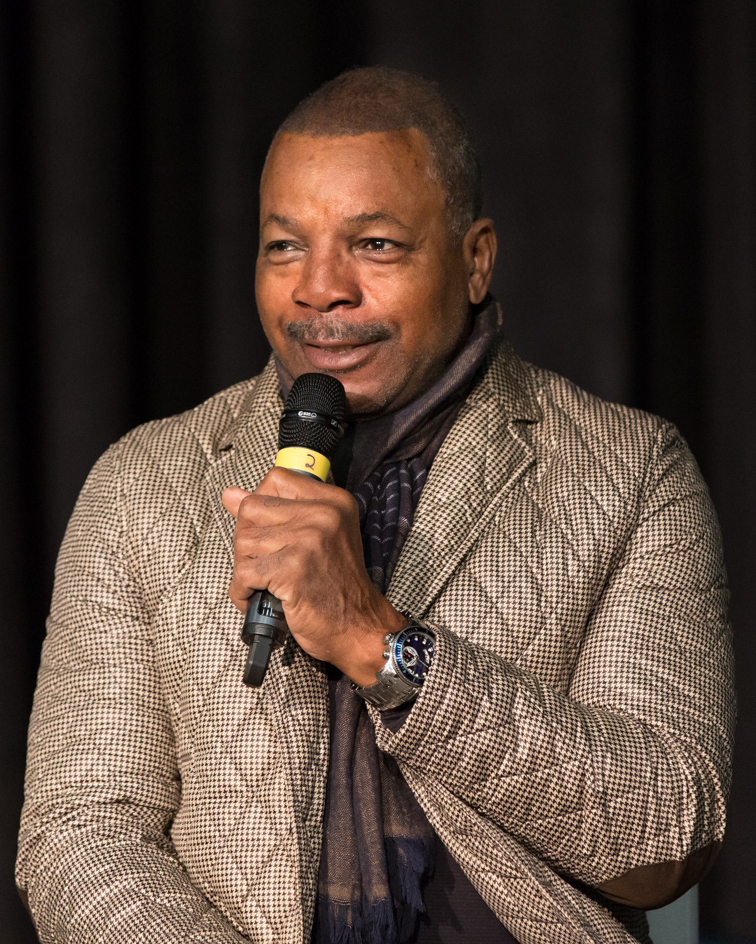
Weathers in 2015

Weathers began working as an extra while still playing football. He had his first significant roles in two blaxploitation films directed by his longtime friend Arthur Marks: Bucktown (1975) and Friday Foster (1975). Weathers also appeared in "The Nude", an early 1975 episode of the sitcom Good Times, portraying an angry husband who suspects his wife of cheating on him with J.J. Weathers also guest-starred in "The Brothers Caine", a 1975 episode of the action TV series Kung Fu and in "The Hero", an episode of Cannon. In 1976, he appeared as a loan shark in an episode of the crime-drama Starsky & Hutch, and in the Barnaby Jones episode "The Bounty Hunter" as escaped convict Jack Hopper.

While auditioning for the role of Apollo Creed alongside Sylvester Stallone in Rocky, Weathers criticized Stallone's acting, which actually led to him getting the role. He reprised the role of Apollo Creed in the following three Rocky films: Rocky II (1979), Rocky III (1982), and Rocky IV (1985).

Weathers briefly appears as an Army MP in one of the three released versions of Close Encounters of the Third Kind (originally released in 1977). In 1978, Weathers portrayed Vince Sullivan in a TV movie, Not This Time. In the late 1970s and 1980s, Weathers starred in a number of action films for the small and big screen, including Force 10 from Navarone (1978), Predator (1987), Action Jackson (1988), and Hurricane Smith (1992). He hosted an episode of Saturday Night Live in 1988 and appeared in a skit in a 2003 episode.

Weathers appeared in Michael Jackson's "Liberian Girl" music video and co-starred in the 1996 Adam Sandler comedy Happy Gilmore, as Chubbs, a golf legend teaching Happy how to play golf. He reprised the role nearly four years later in the Sandler comedy Little Nicky. Filming a fall stunt in Happy Gilmore, Weathers fractured two vertebrae after which osteophytes grew and fused pathologically. He said he was in excruciating pain for three to four years.

Another notable television role was Sgt. Adam Beaudreaux on the cop show Street Justice. Afterwards, during the final two seasons of In the Heat of the Night (1992–1994), his character, Hampton Forbes, replaced Bill Gillespie as the chief of police. He also played MACV-SOG Colonel Brewster in the CBS series Tour of Duty.

In 2004, Weathers received a career revival as a comedic actor beginning with appearances in three episodes of the comedy series Arrested Development as a cheapskate caricature of himself, who serves as Tobias Fünke's acting coach. He was then cast in the comedies The Sasquatch Gang and The Comebacks. Weathers had a guest role in two episodes of The Shield as the former training officer of main character Vic Mackey.

Weathers provided the voice for Colonel Samuel Garrett in the Pandemic Studios video game Mercenaries: Playground of Destruction. In 2005, he was a narrator on Conquest! The Price of Victory — Witness the Journey of the Trojans!, an 18-part television show about USC athletics. Weathers was a principal of Red Tight Media, a film and video production company that specializes in tactical training films made for the United States armed forces. He also appeared in one episode of ER in 2008 during its finale season.

For the sixth film in the Rocky series, Rocky Balboa (2006), Stallone asked Weathers, Mr. T, and Dolph Lundgren for permission to use footage from their appearances in the earlier Rocky films. Mr. T and Lundgren agreed, but Weathers wanted an actual part in the movie, even though his character had died in Rocky IV. Stallone refused, and Weathers decided not to allow Stallone to use his image for flashbacks from the previous films. They instead used footage of a fighter who looks similar to Weathers. Weathers and Stallone patched up their differences and Weathers agreed to allow footage of him from previous films to be used throughout Creed (2015).

Weathers portrayed the father of Michael Strahan and Daryl "Chill" Mitchell's characters on the short-lived 2009 Fox sitcom Brothers. Weathers acted as Brian "Gebo" Fitzgerald in advertising for Old Spice's sponsorship of NASCAR driver Tony Stewart. He also appeared in an ongoing series of web-only advertisements for Credit Union of Washington, dispensing flowers and the advice that "change is beautiful" to puzzled-looking bystanders. He also starred in a series of commercials for Bud Light, in which he introduced plays from the "Bud Light Playbook." At the conclusion of each commercial, Weathers could be seen bursting through the Bud Light Playbook and shouting "Here we go!"

In 2019, Weathers appeared as Greef Karga in several episodes of the first season of the Star Wars series The Mandalorian. He returned for the second season and also directed the episode "Chapter 12: The Siege". He returned for season 3 and directed the episode "Chapter 20: The Foundling". His performance earned him an Emmy nomination for Outstanding Guest Actor.

== Personal life ==
Weathers was married three times. He married Mary-Ann Castle in 1973; they had two sons and divorced in 1983. In 1984, Weathers married Rhona Unsell; they divorced in 2006. Weathers was married to Jennifer Peterson from 2007 until 2009. Weathers was with his longtime partner Christine Kludjian from 2014, until his death in 2024.

=== Death ===
Weathers died at his home in Los Angeles on February 2, 2024, at age 76, from atherosclerotic cardiovascular disease. Weathers's body was cremated. On August 29, 2024, he was honored with a Hollywood Walk of Fame Star Ceremony.

== Filmography ==
=== Film ===
Year	Title	Role	Notes
1973	Magnum Force	Demonstrator	Uncredited
1975	Bucktown	Hambone	
1975	Friday Foster	Yarbro	
1976	The Four Deuces	Taxi Cab Driver	
1976	Rocky	Apollo Creed	
1977	Close Encounters of the Third Kind	MP Officer	
1977	Semi-Tough	Dreamer Tatum	
1978	Force 10 from Navarone	Sgt. Olen Weaver	
1979	Rocky II	Apollo Creed	
1981	Death Hunt	George Washington Lincoln "Sundog" Brown	
1982	Rocky III	Apollo Creed	
1985	Rocky IV	Apollo Creed	Director's cut released in 2021
1987	Predator	Colonel Al Dillon	
1988	Action Jackson	Sgt. / Lt. Jericho "Action" Jackson	Nominated—NAACP Image Award for Outstanding Actor in a Motion Picture
1992	Hurricane Smith	Billy "Hurricane" Smith	
1996	Happy Gilmore	Derick "Chubbs" Peterson	
2000	Little Nicky	Derick "Chubbs" Peterson	Uncredited
2002	Eight Crazy Nights	GNC Water Bottle	Voice
2004	Balto III: Wings of Change	Kirby	Voice; direct-to-video
2006	The Sasquatch Gang	Dr. Artimus Snodgrass	
2007	The Comebacks	Freddie Wiseman / Narrator	
2012	Sheriff Tom vs. the Zombies	President Weathers	Cameo
2014	Think Like a Man Too	Mr. Davenport	Uncredited
2015	Creed	Apollo Creed	Archive footage
2019	Toy Story 4	Combat Carl	Voice cameo, final film role

=== Television ===
Year	Title	Role	Notes
1975	Good Times	Calvin Brooks	Episode: "The Nude"
1975	Cannon	Dan Daily Chronicle reporter	Episode: "The Hero"
1975	The Six Million Dollar Man	Stolar	Episode: "One of Our Running Backs Is Missing"
1975	Kung Fu	Bad Sam	Episode: "The Brothers Caine"
1975	S.W.A.T. (1975 TV series)	Ed	Episode: "Criss-Cross"
1976	Starsky & Hutch	Al Martin	Season: 2 Episode: 14 "Nightmare"
1976	Barnaby Jones	Jack Hopper	Episode: "The Bounty Hunter"
1977	Quinn Martin's Tales of the Unexpected	Hank Dalby	Episode: "A Hand For Sonny Blue"
1977	Streets of San Francisco	Officer Hague	Episode: "Innocent No More"
1977	The Hostage Heart	Bateman Hooks	Television film
1978	The Bermuda Depths	Eric	Television film
1985	Braker	Lt. Harry Braker	Television film
1986	The Defiant Ones	Cullen Monroe	Television film
1986	Fortune Dane	Fortune Dane	Main role, 5 episodes
1989–90	Tour of Duty	Col. Carl Brewster	Recurring role, 9 episodes
1990	Dangerous Passion	Kyle Western	Television film
1991–1993	Street Justice	Adam Beaudreaux	Main role, 44 episodes
1993–1995	In the Heat of the Night	Police Chief Hampton Forbes	Main role, 28 episodes
1995	Tom Clancy's Op Center	Gen. Mike Rodgers	Television film
1997	Assault on Devil's Island	Roy Brown	Television film
1999	Assault on Death Mountain	Roy Brown	Television film
2003, 2007	The Shield	Joe Clark	Episodes: "Haunts", "Partners"
2004–2013	Arrested Development	Carl Weathers	4 episodes
2005	Alien Siege	Gen. Skyler	Television film
2008	Phoo Action	Chief Benjamin Benson	Television pilot
2008	ER	Louie Taylor	Episode: "Oh, Brother"
2010	Psych	Boone	Season: 5 Episode 6: "Viagra Falls"
2011, 2013	Regular Show	God of Basketball, Basketball King	Voice; episodes: "Slam Dunk", "Bank Shot"
2012	American Warships	Gen. McKraken	Television film
2013	Toy Story of Terror!	Combat Carl and Jr	Voice; television special
2016	Colony	Beau	Recurring role, 7 episodes
2016–2017	Chicago P.D.	State's Attorney Mark Jefferies	4 episodes
2016–2017	Chicago Fire	State's Attorney Mark Jefferies	2 episodes
2017	Chicago Justice	State's Attorney Mark Jefferies	Main role, 13 episodes
2017–2019	Star vs. the Forces of Evil	Omnitraxus Prime, Additional voices	Voice; recurring role, 10 episodes
2018	Law & Order: Special Victims Unit	State's Attorney Mark Jefferies	Episode: "Zero Tolerance"
2018	Magnum P.I.	Dan Sawyer	Episode: "From the Head Down"
2019	Pinky Malinky	The Apologizer	Voice
2019–2023	The Mandalorian	Greef Karga	10 episodes; Director: "Chapter 12: The Siege" and "Chapter 20: The Foundling"; Nominated—Primetime Emmy Award for Outstanding Guest Actor in a Drama Series

=== Video games ===
Year	Title	Voice role	Notes
2005	Mercenaries: Playground of Destruction	Col. Samuel Garrett	
2015	Mortal Kombat X	Jax - 'Dillon' Skin	
2021	The Artful Escape	Lightman	

== See also ==
- 1971 Oakland Raiders season
