= Cabin Pressure (film) =

2002 Canadian film

- Film poster
- Based on: story by Douglas Schwartz; Tom Greene
- Written by: Douglas Schwartz; Scot Morison
- Teleplay by: Kevin L. Beggs (credited as Kevin Beggs)
- Directed by: Alan Simmonds
- Starring: Craig Sheffer, John Pyper-Ferguson; Michael Kopsa
- Theme music composer: Ken Harrison
- Composer: Ken Harrison
- Country of origin: Canada
- Original language: English

Production
- Producer: Harold Lee Tichenor
- Cinematography: Attila Szalay
- Editor: Ron Yoshida (credited as Ron E. Yoshida)
- Running time: 93 minutes
- Production companies: Crescent Entertainment; Lions Gate Entertainment/

Original release
- Release: March 11, 2003 (U.S.)

Cabin Pressure (also known as Hijack'd and Autopilot) is a 2002 Canadian action film. The television film was broadcast in 2003 and released to home media shortly after. Cabin Pressure stars Craig Sheffer, John Pyper-Ferguson, and Michael Kopsa.

== Plot ==
Genesys 1, a fully automated Corbett Aviation test aircraft, is prepared to make its maiden voyage. Six months earlier, a similar test flight turned into tragedy when the aircraft controls became locked. Corbett Airline engineer Gabriel Wingfield (John Pyper-Ferguson) was blamed for the disaster and fired by company president Ty Corbett (Winston Rekert).

When he finds that Corbett is aboard the first flight, Wingfield hacks into the flight's computer system. The test flight deviates from its determined route and begins flying a circular pattern over Seattle. Wingfield demands a ransom or the aircraft will crash.

Former Navy pilot Peter "Bird Dog" Dewmont (Craig Sheffer) must race against the clock to find the disgruntled former employee and regain control of the aircraft before it crashes into Seattle.

== Cast ==
- Craig Sheffer as Peter "Bird Dog" Dewmont
- John Pyper-Ferguson as Gabriel Wingfield (credited as John Pyper Ferguson)
- Rachel Hayward as Reece Robbins
- Winston Rekert as Ty Corbett
- Françoise Yip as Tammy
- Jason Low as David Caulfield
- Nels Lennarson as Jimmy Dupre
- Neil Schell as Don Parks
- Gary Jones as Nick Smythe
- Ed Evanko as Senator Caulfield (credited as Edward Evanko)
- Michael Kopsa as passenger
- Alexandria Mitchell as Blair
- Jane Sowerby as Mother
- Caron Prins as TV Reporter
- Dan Muldoon as Gustafson
- George Gray as Cable Guy
- Claire Riley as Doctor
- Winnie Hung as Nurse
- Katrina Matthews as Bar Girl
- Sheila Tyson as Bystander
- Ken Phelan as FBI Agent
- Stefanie von Pfetten as Brandee Caulfield (credited as Stefanie Von Pfetten)

== Production ==
Principal photography took place in Vancouver, British Columbia.

== Reception ==
Cabin Pressure (released in home video as Hijack'd) was reviewed in The Movie Scene, "... 'Cabin Pressure' isn't so much a movie but a collection of movie cliches surrounding a troubled plane, in this case a completely computer operated plane. As such we have a former pilot with a drinking problem, a disgruntled former employee looking for revenge, of course a troubled plane but on top of that so much cheese that "Cabin Pressure" is one of those movies which becomes entertaining for what is bad."
