= Thunder in Paradise =

1994 American television series

- Created by: Michael Berk; Douglas Schwartz; Gregory J. Bonann
- Starring: Hulk Hogan; Chris Lemmon; Carol Alt; Ashley Gorrell; Patrick Macnee
- Ending theme: Terry "Hulk" Hogan; Jimmy Hart; John Maguire
- Composers: John D'Andrea; Cory Lerios
- Country of origin: United States
- Original language: English
- No. of seasons: 1
- No. of episodes: 22

Production
- Executive producers: Michael Berk; Douglas Schwartz; Terry "Hulk" Hogan; Gregory J. Bonann
- Running time: 45 minutes
- Production companies: Berk/Schwartz/Bonann Productions; Rysher Entertainment; Trimark Pictures

Original release
- Network: Syndication
- Release: March 25 – November 27, 1994

Thunder in Paradise is an American action-adventure TV series from the creators of Baywatch, which stars Hulk Hogan, Chris Lemmon, and Carol Alt. This first-run syndicated TV series originally premiered as a DTV feature film in September 1993, then, through a collaboration between Hogan and the Walt Disney Company, ran for one season, which consisted of 22 episodes, from March 25 until November 27, 1994, before being cancelled. In May 1994, during a taping of WCW Saturday Night, Hogan publicly expressed a desire to return to professional wrestling and hinted that he would no longer be a part of the show. The series was later rebroadcast on the TNT cable network.

== Series concept ==
Thunder in Paradise follows the adventures of two ex-Navy SEALs, Randolph J. "Hurricane" Spencer and Martin "Bru" Brubaker, who work as mercenaries out of their tropical resort headquarters along Florida's Gulf Coast. Using their futuristic, high-tech boat, nicknamed Thunder, they travel around the world fighting various criminals and villains. They must also balance their dangerous undercover work with their responsibilities of raising widower Spencer's young stepdaughter Jessica, who lives with them.

Former model Kelly LaRue, who owns and manages the Scuttlebutt Bar & Grill on the beach in front of the resort, looks after Jessica whenever Spence and Bru go on their missions. Kelly also serves as a romantic foil for Bru. Edward Whitaker, Jessica's uncle, owns the beach resort and makes semi-regular appearances in the series, primarily for comic relief.

While made by creators of Baywatch, Thunder in Paradise was in fact the result of a collaboration between Hogan, who also served as executive producer, and the Walt Disney Company, which lent Hogan its biggest soundstage at the Disney MGM Studios in November 1993 as the filming location for the series.

== Characters ==
=== Main cast ===
- Hulk Hogan as Randolph J. "Hurricane" Spencer
- Chris Lemmon as Martin "Bru" Brubaker
- Carol Alt as Kelly LaRew
- Ashley Gorrell as Jessica Whitaker Spencer (episodes 3–22)
- Patrick Macnee as Edward Whitaker
- Russ Wheeler as The Voice of Thunder

=== Recurring cast ===
- Steve Borden as Adam "Hammerhead" McCall
- Kiki Shepard as Trelawny / DJ Moran
- Brutus "The Barber" Beefcake as Brutus, and The Beast
- Jim "The Anvil" Neidhart as Norman Kawolski
- Jimmy Hart as Jimmy
- Heidi Mark as Alison Wilson
- Jorge Gonzáles as Mortador / Terremoto

=== Guest stars and other notable cast ===
- Cary-Hiroyuki Tagawa as Mason Lee
- Robin Weisman as Jessica Whitaker Spencer (episodes 1–2, 15)
- Felicity Waterman as Megan Whitaker Spencer (episodes 1–2)
- Sam J. Jones as David Kilmer
- Carlos Lauchu as Prince Aramour
- Richard Lynch as Volcoff
- Frank Welker as The Voice of The Beast
- John O'Hurley as Bryden Chubshaw
- Sherman Hemsley as Captain Hawspipe
- George Cheung as Dai Ri
- Terry Funk as Amarillo Doaks

== Episodes ==
No.	Title	Directed by	Written by	Original release date
1	"Thunder in Paradise: Part 1"	Douglas Schwartz	Story by : Douglas Schwartz & Michael Berk; Teleplay by : Michael Berk	March 25, 1994
2	"Thunder in Paradise: Part 2"	Douglas Schwartz	Story by : Douglas Schwartz & Michael Berk; Teleplay by : Michael Berk	March 25, 1994
3	"Tug of War"	Douglas Schwartz	Michael Berk	April 1, 1994
4	"Sea Quentin"	Gregory J. Bonann	John Hill	April 8, 1994
5	"Strange Bru"	Lyndon Chubbuck	David Braff	April 15, 1994
6	"Sealed with a Kismet: Part 1"	Douglas Schwartz	Tom Greene	April 22, 1994
7	"Sealed with a Kismet: Part 2"	Douglas Schwartz	Tom Greene	April 29, 1994
8	"Changing of the Guard"	Gus Trikonis	W.M. Whitehead	May 6, 1994
9	"Gettysburg Change of Address"	Russ Mayberry	Jonathan Thorp	May 13, 1994
10	"Distant Shout of Thunder"	Lyndon Chubbuck	Tom Greene	May 20, 1994
11	"Nature of the Beast"	Gus Trikonis	Tom Greene	May 27, 1994
12	"Identity Crisis"	Gregory J. Bonann	Michael Berk	July 8, 1994
13	"Queen of Hearts"	Lewis Stout	W.M. Whitehead	July 15, 1994
14	"Plunder in Paradise"	Bernard L. Kowalski	Jonathan Thorp	July 22, 1994
15	"Eye for an Eye"	Gregory J. Bonann	Michael Berk	August 26, 1994
16	"Endangered Species"	Les Sheldon	Michael Berk	September 9, 1994
17	"Deadly Lessons: Part 1"	Douglas Schwartz	Deborah Bonann Schwartz	September 16, 1994
18	"Deadly Lessons: Part 2"	Douglas Schwartz	Deborah Bonann Schwartz	September 23, 1994
19	"Blast Off"	Paul Cajero	David Braff	November 6, 1994
20	"Dead Reckoning"	Tom Greene	Tom Greene	November 13, 1994
21	"The M.A.J.O.R. and the Minor: Part 1"	Gregory J. Bonann	Tom Greene	November 20, 1994
22	"The M.A.J.O.R. and the Minor: Part 2"	Gregory J. Bonann	Tom Greene	November 27, 1994

== Home media ==
- The pilot movie was originally released on home video the week of September 27, 1993. It was not broadcast on television until the beginning of Season 1, after which it was split into three episodes ("Thunder in Paradise: Part 1-2," "Eye For An Eye") for reruns and later syndication.
- The two-part episode "Sealed with a Kismet" was combined and released to home video as the feature Thunder in Paradise II.
- The two-part episode "Deadly Lessons" was combined and released to home video as the feature Thunder in Paradise 3.
- The two-part episode "The M.A.J.O.R. and the Minor" was used as the basis for the Thunder in Paradise CD-i interactive game. In addition to the episode itself, additional footage was filmed for use at different stages in the game. This game-exclusive footage was shot at the same time as the episode itself. Another video game based on Thunder in Paradise, this one from The Software Toolworks, was announced for the Super Nintendo Entertainment System but never released.

In September 2006, Lionsgate released a DVD 3-disc Thunder in Paradise Collection that contained Thunder in Paradise ("Thunder in Paradise" Parts 1 & 2), Thunder in Paradise II ("Sealed with a Kismet" Parts 1 & 2), and Thunder in Paradise 3 ("Deadly Lessons" Part 1 & 2).

== Filming locations ==
The Thunder in Paradise pilot movie was filmed in and around the historic The Don CeSar hotel in St. Pete Beach, Florida, during April 1993. When the series was picked up for a full season, the production company then moved to Disney's Hollywood Studios, which prior to 2008 was known as the "Disney-MGM Studios," near Orlando, Florida, where the primary filming location became Disney's Grand Floridian Resort & Spa at Walt Disney World. Other filming locations at Walt Disney World included Disney's Old Key West Resort, Disney's Fort Wilderness Resort & Campground, and Epcot, used heavily due to the wide variety of futuristic and international architectural styles available at that theme park. The destruction of the school featured in the two-part episode "Deadly Lessons" was an actual controlled demolition of a school building in Central Florida that the production company agreed to perform in exchange for filming rights. Stetson University in DeLand, Florida was utilized for an episode.

== Reception ==
On the release of the DVD collection in 2006, the series was reviewed by David Cornelius of DVD Talk:

It's 1990s television for action fans who can't handle the subtle nuances of Baywatch Nights. It's stupid, sexist, and embarrassing, but oh, how much fun it is.

Cornelius admits to giving the series a higher rating than usual, and selectively recommends it but warns that "those not so fond of Bad Movie fun, meanwhile, should obviously skip it". In 2008, Entertainment Weekly ranked it as the "cheesiest" syndicated TV series.
