= List of Baywatch characters =

This is a list of the characters in the TV series Baywatch and Baywatch: Hawaii.

== Cast timeline ==
Character	Portrayed by	Pilot	Baywatch									Baywatch: Hawaii		Reunion
Character	Portrayed by	Pilot	1	2	3	4	5	6	7	8	9	10	11	Reunion
Mitch Buchannon	David Hasselhoff	Main	Main	Main	Main	Main	Main	Main	Main	Main	Main	Main		Main
Craig Pomeroy	Parker Stevenson	Main	Main							Rec.	Rec.			
Jill Riley	Shawn Weatherly	Main	Main											
Eddie Kramer	Billy Warlock	Main (Note: Warlock and Eleniak depart in "River of No Return" (3.2).)	Main	Main	Main									Main
Shauni McClain	Erika Eleniak	Main	Main	Main	Main									
Trevor Cole	Peter Phelps	Main	Main											
Hobie Buchannon	Brandon Call	Main	Main											
Hobie Buchannon	Jeremy Jackson			Main (Note: In season 9, Jackson appears only in "Hot Summer Night" (9.7), "Double Jeopardy" (9.19) and "Wave Rage" (9.20).)	Main	Main	Main	Main	Main	Main	Main	G.		Main
Don Thorpe	Monte Markham	Main	Main	Main										
Gina Pomeroy	Gina Hecht	M.												
Gina Pomeroy	Holly Gagnier		M.											
Garner Ellerbee	Gregory Alan Williams		M. (Note: Williams appears in a recurring role before being added to the opening credits from "Home Cort" (1.13).)	R.	Main (Note: Williams is removed from opening credits after "Dead of Summer" (3.11), but continues to appear as a recurring guest star. He returns to the credits from "Race Against Time" (4.1). In season 6, he appears only in the opening credits for "Forbidden Paradise" (6.19 & 6.20).)	Main	Main	Main		G.				
John D. Cort	John Allen Nelson		M. (Note: Nelson is added to the opening credits from "Home Cort" (1.13).)	G.		Guest	Guest							Main
Ben Edwards	Richard Jaeckel (Note: Jaeckel previously appeared as Al Gibson in Baywatch: Panic at Malibu Pier.)			M.	R.	G.								
Harvey Miller	Tom McTigue			M.										
Roberta "Summer" Quinn	Nicole Eggert				Main	Main								Main
Matt Brody	David Charvet				Main (Note: In season 6, Charvet appears as a guest star in "Home is Where the Heat is" (6.9) and "Freefall" (6.16), and is added to the opening credits for "Forbidden Paradise" (6.19 & 6.20) only.)	Main	Main	Main						
Casey Jean "C.J." Parker	Pamela Anderson (Note: Anderson is credited as "Pamela Denise Anderson" in seasons 3 and 4, and as "Pamela Lee" in seasons 6 and 7, following her marriage to Tommy Lee.)				Main	Main	Main	Main	Main					Main
Jimmy Slade	Kelly Slater				M.	G.								
Stephanie Holden	Alexandra Paul				Main	Main	Main	Main	R.					M. (Note: Paul plays a Stephanie look-a-like Judy Radin.)
Caroline Holden	Yasmine Bleeth					G.	Main	Main	Main	R.				Main
Logan Fowler	Jaason Simmons						Main	Main	R.					
Cody Madison	David Chokachi							Main	Main	Main	Main			
Neely Capshaw	Gena Lee Nolin						G. (Note: The character is played initially by Heather Campbell in "Wet N' Wild" (5.22).)	Main	Main	Main	R. (Note: Jennifer Campbell takes over the role from "Crash" (9.1) to "Wave Rage" (9.20).)			Main
Donna Marco	Donna D'Errico								Main	Main				
Manny Gutierrez	José Solano								Main	Main	R.			
Jordan Tate	Traci Bingham								Main	Main				
Samantha Thomas	Nancy Valen (Note: Valen previously appeared as Hallie in Baywatch: Panic at Malibu Pier.)								M.					
Michael "Newmie" Newman	Michael Newman	G.	Recurring	Recurring	Recurring	Recurring	Recurring	Recurring	Main	Main	Main	Main		
Lani McKenzie	Carmen Electra									M.				Main
April Giminski	Kelly Packard (Note: Packard previously appeared as minor characters in seasons 2 and 6.)									Main	Main			
Jack "J.D." Darius	Michael Bergin									Main	Main	Main	Main	Main
Taylor Walsh	Angelica Bridges									M.				Main
Skylar Bergman	Marliece Andrada (Note: Andrada previously appeared as several uncredited background characters throughout season 7 and as the mermaid Mellisande in "Rendezvous" (7.17).)									M.				
Alex Ryker	Mitzi Kapture										M.			
Jessica "Jessie" Owens	Brooke Burns										Main	Main	G.	
Dawn Masterton	Brandy Ledford											M.		
Allie Reese	Simmone Mackinnon										G.	M.		
Kekoa Tanaka	Stacy Kamano											Main	Main	Main
Jason Ioane	Jason Momoa											Main	Main	Main
Sean Monroe	Jason Brooks (Note: Brooks previously appeared as Brown Goodman in "Game of Chance" (2.21).)											Main	Main	
Leigh Dyer	Brande Roderick												Main	Main
Zack McEwan	Charlie Brumbly												M.	
Jenna Avid	Krista Allen											R.	M.	

Cast notes

== Baywatch (1989–1990; 1991–1999) ==
Mitchell "Mitch" Buchannon (David Hasselhoff, Baywatch: Panic at Malibu Pier, seasons 1–9)
The head lifeguard, promoted to lieutenant in the pilot movie, and later to captain in season 8. He shares a son, Hobie, with his former wife, Gayle (Wendie Malick), who lives in Ohio. In later seasons, he is romantically involved with Stephanie, and briefly marries Neely. Hasselhoff also reprises his role as Mitch in the spin-off Baywatch Nights, season 1 of Baywatch: Hawaii (where he is presumably killed in a boat explosion) and the reunion movie Baywatch: Hawaiian Wedding (where it is revealed he survived and was in a coma). The role was originally offered to Tom Selleck who declined. Hasselhoff was hesitant in accepting the part (describing the show as "Knight Rider in a bathing suit") but was eventually cast over actors William Katt, Tom Wopat and Lorenzo Lamas. Dwayne Johnson plays the role in the 2017 film.
Craig Pomeroy (Parker Stevenson, Baywatch: Panic at Malibu Pier, season 1; recurring seasons 8–9)
A lifeguard who works as a lawyer on the side. After the first season, he moves away to Connecticut to start a family with his wife Gina, and works at a law firm in New York. In season 8, he returns to Los Angeles to defend a Chumash elder, having been separated from Gina for months. He eventually becomes romantically involved with lifeguard April Giminski.
Jill Riley (Shawn Weatherly, Baywatch: Panic at Malibu Pier, season 1)
The most experienced female lifeguard on the team. She is a former professional volleyball player, and acts as Shauni's mentor during the first season. In the episode "Shark Derby" (1.19), she is attacked by a Great White Shark and dies from blood embolism.
Eddie Kramer (Billy Warlock, Baywatch: Panic at Malibu Pier, seasons 1–3)
A street kid from Philadelphia, who endured a rough childhood in the foster care system. Craig and his wife Gina take him under their wing and he becomes a lifeguard. Later, he becomes romantically involved with Shauni (Warlock and Eleniak also dated offscreen). At the beginning of season three, he and Shauni get married and move to Australia. Warlock left as he was unhappy with the direction of the show, however later reprised his role in a first season episode of Baywatch Nights in 1996, and in the reunion movie Baywatch: Hawaiian Wedding in 2003 (where it is revealed that he and Shauni separated, and he becomes romantically involved with Caroline Holden).
Shauni McClain (Erika Eleniak, Baywatch: Panic at Malibu Pier, seasons 1–3)
A lifeguard rookie and the show's female lead in the first two seasons. Although Shauni lets her fears get the better of her at first, she improves under the mentorship of Jill and is devastated by her death at the end of the first season. Later, she falls in love with Eddie, much to the disappointment of her wealthy businessman father. At the start of season three, Shauni and Eddie get married and move to Australia for a lifeguard exchange program.
Trevor Cole (Peter Phelps, Baywatch: Panic at Malibu Pier, season 1)
A cocky Australian clubhouse lifeguard and ladies' man. After a boat party leaves his then-girlfriend fighting for her life, Trevor enters rookie school to become a certified county lifeguard where he passes as top of his class. He disappears from the show after "Home Court" (1.13), presumably returning to Sydney, although he remains in the opening credits for the rest of the season.
Hobie Buchannon (Brandon Call, Baywatch: Panic at Malibu Pier, season 1; Jeremy Jackson, seasons 2–9)
Mitch's son. He is 13 years old in the first season (when played by Call), then retconned to age 10 in season two (when Jackson takes over the role), and is college age by the time the series ends. He would follow in his father's footsteps and become a lifeguard in later seasons. Jackson reprises his role in a season 1 episode of Baywatch: Hawaii and the reunion movie Baywatch: Hawaiian Wedding (where it is revealed that he had entered a relationship with his long-time former crush, Summer Quinn). According to Hasselhoff, the role almost went to Leonardo DiCaprio.
Captain Don Thorpe (Monte Markham, Baywatch: Panic at Malibu Pier, seasons 1–2)
A senior lifeguard with the rank of captain. He is later promoted to chief and not seen again, although he is mentioned several times. Rob Huebel plays the role in the 2017 film, although he is reimagined as one of the antagonists.
Gina Pomeroy (Gina Hecht, Baywatch: Panic at Malibu Pier; Holly Gagnier, season 1)
Craig's loving and supportive wife. In season 8, it is revealed that they have separated and that Gina was living in Washington, D.C.
Sgt. Garner Ellerbee (Gregory Alan Williams, seasons 1, 3–6; recurring seasons 2, 8)
LAPD officer who patrols the beach. He is good friends with the lifeguards, but hates the water. Williams reprises the role for the first season of the spin-off Baywatch Nights, having quit the police force to form his own detective agency with Mitch and Ryan McBride. Yahya Abdul-Mateen II plays the role in the 2017 film.
John D. Cort (John Allen Nelson, season 1; recurring seasons 2, 4–5)
Former US Navy Seal turned lifeguard with a bad boy reputation. He has a romantic history with C.J., and often gets Mitch in trouble with his money-making schemes. Later, he is diagnosed with a degenerative eye disease, forcing him into retirement. Nelson reprises his role in the reunion movie Baywatch: Hawaiian Wedding (where he enters a relationship with Lani McKenzie).
Harvey Miller (Tom McTigue, season 2)
A free-spirited lifeguard, who often comes up with get-rich-quick schemes and has lofty dreams of seducing beautiful women who are way out of his league.
Ben Edwards (Richard Jaeckel, season 2; recurring seasons 3–4)
Longest serving lifeguard veteran who retired in 1994. He was part of the first team of lifeguards, known as "The Red Knights", which formed in the 1950s. He had a close relationship with Mitch, and served as a mentor to him. Sometime before the series started, Ben had crushed his hip when he jumped from a height of 100 feet to save a drowning fisherman. He was unable to swim after this injury and required the use of a walking cane. Captain Thorpe promoted Ben to lieutenant instead of firing him. After Thorpe's departure, he was promoted to captain. Jaeckel previously played veteran lifeguard Al Gibson in Baywatch: Panic at Malibu Pier, who dies at the end of the movie heroically saving Hobie.
Roberta "Summer" Quinn (Nicole Eggert, seasons 3–4)
A lifeguard and star athlete in her hometown of Pittsburgh, who moves to California with her mother Jackie to escape Jackie's abusive ex-boyfriend. Later, she becomes romantically involved with Jimmy Slade and Matt Brody, and struggles with bulimia, which she overcomes with C.J.'s help. She breaks up with Matt and pursues an education at Penn State. Eggert reprises her role in the reunion movie Baywatch: Hawaiian Wedding (where it is revealed that she was now in a relationship with Hobie). Alexandra Daddario plays the role in the 2017 film.
Matt Brody (David Charvet, seasons 3–6)
A lifeguard from a wealthy family in France, who has to support himself when he is cut off financially by his overbearing father. He becomes romantically involved with Summer in season 4, and with C.J. in season 5. He is forced to resign because of a phony sexual harassment lawsuit filed by Neely, however he is reinstated after the allegations are proven to be false. He leaves for France in season 6, unable to cope with Neely's return, briefly returning for guest appearances and in the main cast for the "Forbidden Paradise" episodes (6.19 & 6.20). Zac Efron plays the role in the 2017 film.
Casey Jean "C.J." Parker (Pamela Anderson, seasons 3–7)
A former lifeguard and old friend of Mitch's, who left years prior to the show to become a whitewater rafting instructor. She rejoins the team in season 3 with Summer and Matt. She was born in Las Vegas, and has battled a gambling addiction and bulimia. During the series, she becomes romantically involved with John D. Cort, Matt Brody (missing the first 6 episodes of season 6 to be with him in Europe), and Cody Madison. Cody proposes to her in season 7 finale, however she disappears in season 8, where she is said to have left Baywatch to marry a rock singer and run a bar in Mexico. UGO.com voted C.J. Parker one of the top 10 blondes. Anderson reprises her role in the reunion movie Baywatch: Hawaiian Wedding, where it is revealed that she had opened CJ's Bar and Grill in Hawaii. She eventually falls in love and marries one of the resort waiters named Lorenzo. Kelly Rohrbach plays the role in the 2017 film.
Jimmy Slade (Kelly Slater, season 3; recurring season 4)
A gifted surfer trying to go professional, who becomes romantically involved with Summer. He lived alone on the beach in his van, having been abandoned by his mother and falling out with his abusive military father. He eventually breaks into the professional circuit and moves to Hawaii to surf on the North Shore.
Stephanie Holden (Alexandra Paul, seasons 3–6; recurring season 7)
A lieutenant lifeguard, who shares a past with Mitch. They dated years prior to the show, when Stephanie filled in for Jill Riley, who was on vacation at the time. The relationship ended abruptly when Stephanie left Mitch without explanation, when she returns in season 3, she reveals she was married to another man at the time. They eventually become close friends, but continue to have lingering feelings for each other throughout the series. After battling skin cancer, she eventually marries her doctor Tom Morella, however is killed on her honeymoon when she is crushed by a collapsing mast on a sailboat during a lightning storm. Paul reprises the role in a second season episode of Baywatch Nights, appearing as a near-death hallucination to Mitch. She also plays a Stephanie doppelganger Judy Radin in Baywatch: Hawaiian Wedding, who seduces Mitch under the alias Alison Ford. Ilfenesh Hadera plays the role in the 2017 film.
Caroline Holden (Yasmine Bleeth, seasons 5–7; recurring season 4, 8)
Stephanie's younger sister. She appears a guest star in season 4, announcing her engagement to environmentalist Frank Randall. Upon their divorce in season 5, she moves in with her sister and becomes a lifeguard. During the series, she becomes romantically involved with Logan Fowler, and has a fling with J.D., before leaving for New York to star in the soap opera Shannon's Hope. Bleeth reprises her role in a first season episode of the spin-off Baywatch Nights and in the reunion movie Baywatch: Hawaiian Wedding, where she is shown starting a relationship with Eddie Kramer.
Logan Fowler (Jaason Simmons, seasons 5–6; recurring season 7)
A lifeguard recently arrived in California from Tasmania, Australia as part of a lifeguard exchange program. He tends to be rash and reckless in his rescuing, and his constant disobedience causes tensions with C.J. and Matt. He watched his father die in the line of duty while saving people from a burning boat. He later starts dating Caroline, before leaving to pursue a career in filmmaking and photography.
Cody Madison (David Chokachi, seasons 6–9)
An aspiring Olympic swimmer turned lifeguard from Fort Wayne, Indiana. During the series, he enters relationships with C.J. and Lani McKenzie, but both leave him for other men. He stays in Los Angeles when the others move to Hawaii.
Neely Capshaw (Heather Campbell, guest season 5; Gena Lee Nolin, seasons 6–8; Jennifer Campbell, recurring season 9)
The black sheep of the lifeguard team, recently transferred from Huntington Beach. She is selfish, manipulative and conniving, initially falsely accusing Matt of sexual assault when he discovers her drinking on the job. She is fired but after filing a lawsuit against C.J. for illegally recording her, she returns (now played by Nolin) as a receptionist and switchboard operator. After saving an elderly heart attack victim in season 8, she is recertified and reinstated as a lifeguard. She also has a baby, Ashley, with ex-husband Peter, which leads to a painkiller addiction. Eventually, she seems to reform from most of her unsavory deeds, falls in love and marries Mitch. After Nolin left the show over a pay dispute, the role is recast with Jennifer Campbell in a recurring role. She and Mitch break up, and she reverts back to her old ways. She finally leaves Baywatch after Alex punches her in the face for her latest scheme. Nolin reprises the role in Baywatch: Hawaiian Wedding where she and Mitch appear to be reconciling.
Donna Marco (Donna D'Errico, seasons 7–8)
A woman who buys the nightclub Nights from Lou midway through the first season of Baywatch Nights. She eventually joins the lifeguard team in Baywatch, appearing on both series simultaneously during Baywatch Nights's second season. She joins full-time after the latter's cancellation. D'Errico was let go during the "Baywatch Bloodbath", in which the show was retooled and half the cast were fired before season 9.
Manuelo "Manny" Gutierrez (José Solano, seasons 7–8, recurring season 9)
The show's first Hispanic lifeguard, a junior taken on permanently by Mitch following an outstanding physical test. During the series, he becomes romantically involved with April. In season 9, he breaks his back during a rescue and is paralyzed. He stays on with the team, instead working the switchboard.
Jordan Tate (Traci Bingham, seasons 7–8)
The show's first African-American lifeguard and Donna's close friend. Bingham was let go during the "Baywatch Bloodbath".
Captain Samantha "Sam" Thomas (Nancy Valen, season 7)
Lifeguard captain, who occasionally gets on Mitch's nerves, however later they become romantically involved. She eventually quits to pursue a business venture with her ex-fiancé. Valen previously appeared as Hallie in Baywatch: Panic at Malibu Pier.
Mike "Newmie" Newman (Michael Newman, seasons 7–9, recurring seasons 1–6)
A senior lifeguard. Newman, an actual lifeguard with 20 years of experience, was initially hired as a technical consultant for the show, before producers inserted him into the show as a character. He is unlucky in love, and most of his storylines in later seasons revolve around his rivalry with Mitch while pursuing the same woman (played for comedic affect). Apart from Hasselhoff, Newman is the only cast member to appear in every season of the original show. He also reprises the role in three episodes of the spin-off Baywatch Nights, and in the first season of Baywatch: Hawaii.
Leilani "Lani" McKenzie (Carmen Electra, season 8)
A half-Hawaiian lifeguard rookie with dreams of becoming a famous dancer. During the series, she becomes romantically involved with Cody, before leaving to pursue her dancing career in New York. Electra was let go during the "Baywatch Bloodbath". She reprises the role in an episode of Pacific Blue and in the reunion movie Baywatch: Hawaiian Wedding.
April Giminski (Kelly Packard, seasons 8–9)
A lifeguard rookie from Wisconsin, who tries to help physically or mentally challenged beach goers because of her sick brother Charlie. She becomes romantically involved with Manny in season 8, then Craig in season 9. Packard previously appeared as Joannie and "Beach Girl" in season 2 and Beth Campfield in season 6. She was the only female cast member to survive the "Baywatch Bloodbath".
Jack "J.D." Darius (Michael Bergin, seasons 8–9)
A lifeguard veteran who initially competes with Taylor for the lieutenant position. He suffers PTSD after a failed pier rescue that resulted in a victim getting crushed and dying in his arms. During the series, he becomes romantically involved with Jessie, Kekoa and Leigh. Bergin reprises the role for both seasons of Baywatch: Hawaii and the reunion movie Baywatch: Hawaiian Wedding, in which he ends up with Kekoa.
Taylor Walsh (Angelica Bridges, season 8)
A lieutenant who replaces Mitch when he was promoted to captain. Bridges appears only in 6 episodes before being let go during the "Baywatch Bloodbath" (she still remains in the opening credits for the entire season). She reprises the role in the reunion movie Baywatch: Hawaiian Wedding.
Skylar "Sky" Bergman (Marliece Andrada, season 8)
A lifeguard rookie and friend to Lani and April. Andrada previously played uncredited extra roles, as well as the mermaid Mellisande in season 7, and appears as Sky only in 4 episodes before being let go during the "Baywatch Bloodbath" (she still remains in the opening credits for the entire season).
Alex Ryker (Mitzi Kapture, season 9)
A rival of Mitch's, who runs her own company Bayguard. She initially tries to recruit lifeguards away from Baywatch for her own company, but later joins Baywatch as a business consultant before being promoted to lieutenant. She enjoys a flirtation with Mitch, although they never really give into temptation. She stays in Los Angeles when the others move to Hawaii.
Jessica "Jessie" Owens (Brooke Burns, season 9)
A maintenance manager turned lifeguard. Burns reprises the role in the first season of Baywatch: Hawaii, before her character leaves to pursue a career as a stuntwoman. She returns as a guest star in Baywatch: Hawaii season 2, where it is revealed that she has given birth to a son, Luke.

== Baywatch Nights (1995–97) ==
Mitchell "Mitch" Buchannon (David Hasselhoff, seasons 1–2)
Garner Ellerbee (Gregory Alan Williams, season 1)
Ryan McBride (Angie Harmon, seasons 1–2)
A private investigator and forensic expert who partners up with Mitch and Garner to establish the Buchannon, Ellerbee & MacBride Detective Agency in Los Angeles.
Destiny Desimone (Lisa Stahl, season 1 episodes 1–10)
A psychic and tarot reader. Stahl first appeared as the character in season 4 and 5 of Baywatch. She disappears from Baywatch Nights after 5 episodes, although she remains in the opening credits for 5 more. Stahl returns as Nadine in a second season episode.
Lou Raymond (Lou Rawls, season 1)
Owner of the nightclub Nights below the detective agency's office. Later, he sells the club to Donna.
Griff Walker (Eddie Cibrian, season 1 episodes 11–22, season 2)
A private investigator who joins the agency midway through the first season.
Donna Marco (Donna D'Errico, season 1 episodes 11–22, season 2)
Diamont Teague (Dorian Gregory, season 2)
A paranormal expert who joins the agency in the second season.

== Baywatch: Hawaii (1999–2001) ==
Mitchell "Mitch" Buchannon (David Hasselhoff, season 1)
Jessica "Jessie" Owens (Brooke Burns, season 1, recurring season 2)
Jack "J.D." Darius (Michael Bergin, seasons 1–2)
Dawn Masterton (Brandy Ledford, season 1)
An archeologist and lifeguard from Florida. Her gossiping and eccentricities sometimes cause tension with the other lifeguards, however she introduces new techniques to the team, such as hypoxic training.
Mike "Newmie" Newman (Michael Newman, season 1)
Allie Reese (Simmone Jade Mackinnon, season 1)
Australian lifeguard who impressed Mitch on his Australian vacation in the Baywatch: Down Under episodes. She is a qualified helicopter pilot and good at handling lifeboats.
Jason Ioane (Jason Momoa, seasons 1–2)
Hawaiian lifeguard who grew up in Texas with his mother. At nineteen years old, he is one of the youngest on the team, and is very headstrong and stubborn. Momoa reprises the role in Baywatch: Hawaiian Wedding.
Kekoa Tanaka (Stacy Kamano, seasons 1–2)
Half-Japanese, half-Hawaiian lifeguard, who is not afraid to speak her mind. She becomes romantically involved with J.D. during the series. Kamano reprises the role in Baywatch: Hawaiian Wedding.
Captain Sean Monroe (Jason Brooks, seasons 1–2)
Lifeguard captain, who Mitch puts in charge of the Hawaii operation. He blames himself for the death of his son Ben whom he was unable to save from drowning, which led to a divorce from his wife.
Leigh Dyer (Brande Roderick, season 2)
Former coast guard turned lifeguard and Sean's second in command of the Lifeguard team. Roderick reprises the role in Baywatch: Hawaiian Wedding.
Zachary "Zack" McEwan (Charlie Brumbly, season 2)
An eccentric lifeguard trainee who becomes close friend with Jason. He sports an extreme quiff-style of surfer hair, Elvis-style aviator sunglasses and Hawaiian clothing.
Jenna Avid (Krista Allen, season 2, recurring season 1)
A councilwoman turned lifeguard, a femme fatale in the same vein as Neely Capshaw. During the series, she falls in love with Sean.
