= Baywatch the Movie: Forbidden Paradise =

1995 film directed by Douglas Schwartz

- Directed by: Douglas Schwartz
- Written by: Deborah Schwartz
- Based on: Baywatch by Michael Berk; Douglas Schwartz; Gregory J. Bonann
- Produced by: David W. Hager; James Pergola; Paul Cajero
- Starring: David Hasselhoff; Pamela Anderson; David Charvet; Yasmine Bleeth; Jaason Simmons; Alexandra Paul
- Cinematography: James Pergola
- Edited by: David Latham
- Music by: Cory Lerios; John D'Andrea
- Distributed by: Live Home Video
- Release date: June 27, 1995
- Running time: 90 minutes
- Country: United States
- Language: English

Baywatch the Movie: Forbidden Paradise is a 1995 American direct-to-video action film which was about the characters of the popular series Baywatch vacationing in Hawaii. In the film, The Baywatch lifeguards moves to Hawaii for a tropical adventure. The team is threatened when Matt is stung by a fish and captured by Hawaiian villagers.

It was later released as a two-part episode of the series during the sixth season. It was also released as a theatrical film in Europe and other parts of the world.

The film is followed by a sequel, Baywatch: White Thunder at Glacier Bay (1998).

== Plot ==
Baywatch lifeguards Mitch, Stephanie, C.J., Matt, Caroline and Logan travel to Oahu, Hawaii for a vacation and get caught up in a series of misadventures.

Stephanie teamed up with a local lifeguard. Logan became obsessed with competing in a surfing competition which left no time for his girlfriend and fellow lifeguard Caroline.

C.J. was called back to Baywatch, while Mitch and Matt took a boat trip to a remote part of Kauai where they were stranded after Matt was stung by a poisonous scorpion fish, and then they were captured in a remote village of local Hawaiians who had gone native.

It also serves as David Charvet's last Baywatch appearance, spelling an end to his popular character Matt Brody.

== Cast ==
- David Hasselhoff as Mitch Buchannon
- Pamela Anderson as C.J. Parker
- Yasmine Bleeth as Caroline Holden
- Alexandra Paul as Lt. Stephanie Holden
- David Charvet as Matt Brody
- Ricky Dean Logan as Carlton Edwards
- Heidi Mark as Holly
- Gerry Lopez as Himself
- Vincent Klyn as Mark Kealoha
- Jaason Simmons as Logan Fowler
- Lee Doversola as Lea
- Sidney S. Liufau as Mako (Sidney Lauf)
- Brian L. Keaulana as Brian Keaulana
- Ron Rice as Ron
- Buffalo Keaulana as Buffalo
- Celeste Akeo as Mai
- Wallace Akeo as Kona
- Keokeokalae Hughes as Mrs. Alede
- Kimo Hugho as Mr. Alede
- Laisene Auelua as Manu
- Frank Moran as Frank
