= Baywatch: Hawaiian Wedding =

2003 film directed by Douglas Schwartz

- DVD cover
- Based on: Baywatch by Michael Berk; Douglas Schwartz; Gregory J. Bonann
- Screenplay by: Michael Berk
- Story by: Michael Berk; Douglas Schwartz
- Directed by: Douglas Schwartz
- Starring: David Hasselhoff; Pamela Anderson; Michael Bergin; Yasmine Bleeth; Angelica Bridges; Nicole Eggert; Carmen Electra; Jeremy Jackson; Stacy Kamano; Jason Momoa; John Allen Nelson; Gena Lee Nolin; Brande Roderick; Billy Warlock; Alexandra Paul
- Music by: Cory Lerios; John D'Andrea
- Country of origin: United States
- Original language: English

Production
- Producers: Francis J. Conway; David W. Hager
- Cinematography: Stuart Asbjornsen
- Editor: Tom Erwin
- Running time: 100 minutes
- Production companies: Fox Television Studios; FremantleMedia
- Budget: $5.5 million

Original release
- Network: Fox
- Release: February 28, 2003

Baywatch: Hawaiian Wedding is a 2003 American made-for-television action comedy film directed by Douglas Schwartz. The film reunited the original cast members of the television series Baywatch. The story revolves around an old nemesis who threatens Mitch's wedding day as his friends and fellow lifeguards reunite. The film premiered on February 28, 2003 on Fox.

Filming for the film began in September 2002 on Turtle Bay Resort, Oahu, Hawaii.

== Plot ==
After having been thought to have died at the end of the 10th season, it is revealed that Mitch Buchannon only had amnesia where he was recovering in a Los Angeles hospital and has now retired from Lifeguard duty. His new fiancée, Allison Ford (Alexandra Paul), resembles his old lover, Lt. Stephanie Holden (also played by Alexandra Paul), who died during the seventh season of Baywatch. Taylor Walsh (Angelica Bridges) now runs the Baywatch Headquarters, where Leigh Dyer (Brande Roderick) and JD Darius (Michael Bergin) are now in a relationship, and Mitch's son Hobie (Jeremy Jackson) has started a relationship with Summer Quinn (Nicole Eggert). Taylor manages to lure Mitch back to Baywatch so he can introduce everybody to Allison, and they're all surprised that she looks like Stephanie, especially Mitch's ex Neely Capshaw (Gena Lee Nolin), who shows up in an attempt to get Mitch back and becomes suspicious of Allison.

Meanwhile, C.J. (Pamela Anderson) is opening a bar and grill in Hawaii and invites many of the old lifeguards from Baywatch there for a reunion including Caroline Holden (Yasmine Bleeth), now an actress. Also there are John D. Cort (John Allen Nelson) and Eddie Kramer (Billy Warlock), who starts a relationship with Caroline after being separated from Shauni. Lani McKenzie (Carmen Electra) is now a Hula Dancer and is now good friends with C.J. Also, Kekoa Tanaka (Stacy Kamano) and Jason Ioane (Jason Momoa) are now in a relationship. C.J. gets a call from Mitch to announce his engagement to Allison and to tell her that they booked their wedding in Hawaii. But while everyone's there, Mitch's old nemesis, Mason Sato (Cary-Hiroyuki Tagawa), takes pictures of his loved ones to plot his revenge against him.

Neely, still suspicious of Allison, gets into a fight with her in the water, in which she discovers her fingerprints on her necklace, which she gives to Jason to give to his detective brother to run a check on her. After they have the engagement party, they take a boat to Haiku Island, where the wedding will take place.

When they arrive there, Sato's men prepare to capture and drown Lani, Cort, Eddie, Caroline, Hobie, and Summer and record it all on video. Also, Neely finds out from Kekoa and Jason that Allison is really a criminal named Judy Radin who served time for forgery and assault with a deadly weapon, and had reconstructive surgery done to look like Stephanie, but Mitch doesn't believe her until he confronts Allison, who reveals her partner: Sato, and he and Mitch fight, and Sato shows Mitch his drowning friends on video, but gives him a chance to save them.

Neely and Mitch go to save Hobie and Summer, Leigh goes to save Cort and Lani, and J.D. goes to save Eddie and Caroline. But after Mitch and Neely save Hobie by performing CPR, Sato and Allison find them and hold them hostage, but Mitch and Sato fight again and Neely punches Allison and takes the gun from her.

Eddie, Caroline, Lani, and Cort get rescued, while Mitch and Sato continue their fight on the rescue boat, and Sato is killed by the propellers of the boat underwater. The Coast Guard arrives to arrest Allison and Sato's henchmen, and Mitch breaks off their engagement. J.D. and Kekoa became lovers again, and as did Jason and Leigh.

C.J. and her co-worker Lorenzo decide to get married so there would be a wedding while everyone watches, and Mitch and Neely reconcile as well.

== Cast ==
- David Hasselhoff as Mitch Buchannon
- Pamela Anderson as Casey Jean "C.J." Parker
- Alexandra Paul as Allison Ford / Judy Radin
- Yasmine Bleeth as Caroline Holden
- Michael Bergin as Jack "J.D." Darius
- Angelica Bridges as Taylor Walsh
- Nicole Eggert as Roberta "Summer" Quinn
- Carmen Electra as Lani McKenzie
- Jeremy Jackson as Hobie Buchannon
- Stacy Kamano as Kekoa Tanaka
- Jason Momoa as Jason Ioane
- John Allen Nelson as John D. Cort
- Gena Lee Nolin as Neely Capshaw
- Brande Roderick as Leigh Dyer
- Billy Warlock as Eddie Kramer
- Cary-Hiroyuki Tagawa as Mason Sato
