= List of Baywatch Nights episodes =

This is a list of 44 episodes of the American television series Baywatch Nights, a spin-off of Baywatch. The show ran for two seasons from 1995 to 1997. The pitch pilot episode was never broadcast.

Although the first season of Baywatch Nights was a romantic detective comedy, in its second reason, the series focused on horror and paranormal cases.

== Series overview ==
Season	Episodes	Originally released	
Season	Episodes	First released	Last released
1	22	September 30, 1995	May 18, 1996
2	22	September 28, 1996	May 17, 1997

== Episodes ==
=== Season 1 (1995–96) ===
No. overall	No. in season	Title	Directed by	Written by	Original release date
1	1	"Pursuit"	Gus Trikonis	Kimmer Ringwald	September 30, 1995
Mitch Buchannon and Garner Ellerbee become private investigators for a detective agency above a nightclub. Their first job is to protect a fashion model who claims she is being stalked by a madman.
2	2	"Bad Blades"	Georg Fenady	Gordon Dawson	October 7, 1995
A cosmetics mogul asks Mitch, Garner and Ryan to investigate her son's involvement with a gang of roller-skating burglars.
3	3	"Silent Witness"	Richard Friedman	Michael Berk	October 14, 1995
A strange woman asks Mitch and Garner to find her daughter, who is the only witness to a murder.
4	4	"Deadly Vision"	Paul Lynch	Kimmer Ringwald	October 21, 1995
Destiny has a vision of Ryan being the next victim of a serial killer that Mitch and Garner are looking for.
5	5	"Just a Gigolo"	Marty Pasetta, Jr.	Story by : David Assael; Teleplay by : Len Janson	October 28, 1995
Mitch and Ryan go undercover as a gigolo and wealthy widow to catch a gang of robbers.
6	6	"976 Ways to Say I Love You"	Charles Bail	George Geiger	November 4, 1995
Ryan is forced to pose as a phone-sex operator to catch the man who killed one.
7	7	"Pressure Cooker"	Gus Trikonis	Story by : George Geiger; Teleplay by : Len Janson and George Geiger	November 11, 1995
Mitch and Garner catch a drug dealer at a fast-food chicken restaurant, then the dealer's brothers take the club hostage demanding his release from prison.
8	8	"Balancing Act"	Gus Trikonis	George Geiger	November 18, 1995
Mitch, Garner and Ryan investigate the murder of the agency's previous owner.
9	9	"Blues Boy"	Reza Badiyi	Kimmer Ringwald	November 25, 1995
A boy asks Mitch and Garner for help when he thinks his uncle's partners are after him for the location of money stolen from the boy's murdered father.
10	10	"Kind of a Drag"	Bernard L. Kowalski	Story by : David Braff; Teleplay by : Len Janson	December 2, 1995
Mitch goes undercover as a female impersonator to catch the culprits who have been assaulting members of a drag show company.
11	11	"Takeover"	Unknown	Story by : Chad Hayes & Carey W. Hayes; Teleplay by : Robert McCullough	February 3, 1996
Mitch and Ryan investigate a company's hostile takeover, while the sexy Donna Marco buys the Nights club from Lou.
12	12	"Thin Blood"	Georg Fenady	Chad Hayes & Carey W. Hayes	February 10, 1996
Ryan is taken hostage by gangsters claiming her sister made off with their money.
13	13	"Payback"	Reza Badiyi	Len Janson	February 17, 1996
Mitch's old rival Albert Romero asks for his help in searching for his wife, whom he suspects was kidnapped by the mob.
14	14	"Backup"	Charles Bail	Maurice Hurley	February 24, 1996
Eddie Kramer has been blamed for a rescue on the beach that resulted in a death, so he asks Mitch to help clear his name. In the meantime, Garner and Ryan go on a stakeout to catch an alleged thief.
15	15	"Thief in the Night"	Charles Bail	Len Janson	March 2, 1996
Mitch falls for a cat burglar.
16	16	"The Curator"	Georg Fenady	Kimmer Ringwald	March 9, 1996
A psychopath obsessed with Caroline Holden holds her captive.
17	17	"Code of Silence"	Charles Bail	Mark Rodgers	March 16, 1996
Mitch tries to save a young geisha woman from kidnappers.
18	18	"Vengeance"	Georg Fenady	Story by : Maurice Hurley; Teleplay by : Robert McCullough	April 20, 1996
A convict escapes from prison with the intention of getting revenge on everyone who had to do with his arrest and conviction, including Garner.
19	19	"Epilogue"	Reza Badiyi	Kimmer Ringwald	April 27, 1996
Mitch is hired to protect the step-children of a man they suspect murdered their mother for her money.
20	20	"Rendezvous"	Georg Fenady	Mark Rodgers	May 4, 1996
Mitch, Garner and Ryan investigate a family dispute where a woman accuses her husband of corporate embezzlement.
21	21	"A Closer Look"	Bernard L. Kowalski	Kimmer Ringwald	May 11, 1996
An old friend of Mitch's suspects that his estranged wife is an impostor.
22	22	"Heat Rays"	Peter Roger Hunt	E. Paul Edwards	May 18, 1996
Mitch investigates when members of a 1970s surf rocker band die during a reunion at the beach.

=== Season 2 (1996–97) ===
No. overall	No. in season	Title	Directed by	Written by	Original release date
23	1	"Terror of the Deep"	Gregory J. Bonann	Story by : Maurice Hurley & Donald R. Boyle; Teleplay by : Carey W. Hayes & Chad Hayes	September 29, 1996
Mitch and Griff investigate a sunken freighter that a woman claims was sunk by a New Guinea sea monster.
24	2	"The Creature"	David W. Hagar	Story by : Donald R. Boyle; Teleplay by : Greg Strangis & Robert McCullough	October 6, 1996
Mitch, Griff and Ryan investigate a series of murders committed by a half-human, half-fish woman intent on having a baby.
25	3	"The Rig"	Jon Cassar	Story by : Carey W. Hayes & Chad Hayes; Teleplay by : E. Paul Edwards	October 13, 1996
Mitch and Ryan head to an oil rig where they encounter a gelatinous sea monster.
26	4	"The Strike"	David W. Hagar	Michael Sloan	October 20, 1996
Mitch rescues a young man who claims to have a connection with the Roswell incident.
27	5	"Circle of Fear"	Bruce Kessler	Story by : Maurice Hurley; Teleplay by : Donald R. Boyle	October 27, 1996
Mitch and Ryan investigate reports of black arts being committed in the woods and find a book of strange incantations that they trace to an occult book shop.
28	6	"The Cabin"	Reza Badiyi	William Schwartz	November 3, 1996
Mitch and Ryan enter a cabin that takes them back in time.
29	7	"Curse of the Mirrored Box"	Jon Cassar	Story by : Donald R. Boyle; Teleplay by : Carey W. Hayes & Chad Hayes	November 10, 1996
Mitch is shocked that a child he saved six years ago is now part of Haitian voodoo cult.
30	8	"Last Breath"	Gregory J. Bonann	Chad Hayes & Carey W. Hayes	November 17, 1996
Mitch investigates the disappearances of two Baywatch lifeguards who heard cries of drowning.
31	9	"Night Whispers"	Reza Badiyi	Story by : Carey W. Hayes & Chad Hayes; Teleplay by : Donald R. Boyle	November 24, 1996
Ryan suspects that a woman she and Mitch saw commit a murder is a vampire.
32	10	"Space Spore"	Richard Friedman	Carey W. Hayes & Chad Hayes	January 19, 1997
Radioactive dust from a space shuttle is accidentally dropped onto a farmer's field.
33	11	"Possessed"	David W. Hagar	Donald R. Boyle	February 2, 1997
Donna becomes possessed by the spirit of a dead serial killer.
34	12	"Frozen Out of Time"	Rick Jacobson	Chad Hayes & Carey W. Hayes	February 9, 1997
Two 900-year-old Vikings awaken from their frozen slumber and resume their feud in Los Angeles.
35	13	"Nights to Dragon One"	Richard Friedman	Donald R. Boyle	February 16, 1997
Mitch and Ryan must play a computer game similar to Dungeons & Dragons to rescue a man and his daughter being held hostage by the game master.
36	14	"Ascension"	Jon Cassar	Greg Strangis & Robert McCullough	February 23, 1997
Mitch, Ryan and Teague are faced with torture devices that are controlled electronically by a woman.
37	15	"The Mobius"	David Livingston	E. Paul Edwards	March 2, 1997
An old school friend of Ryan's shows her and Mitch a laser that transports them to a parallel universe.
38	16	"Zargtha"	Rick Jacobson	Maurice Hurley	April 5, 1997
Mitch and Ryan investigate when a monster resembling a wolf attacks teenage runaways in an abandoned building about to be demolished.
39	17	"The Servant"	Georg Fenady	Gerry Conway	April 12, 1997
A mummy comes to life and stalks the employees of a museum warehouse.
40	18	"Symbol of Death"	Richard Friedman	Robert McCullough & Greg Strangis	April 19, 1997
Mitch and Ryan investigate Teague's disappearance with the help of a man claiming that aliens are planning to take over the Earth.
41	19	"The Eighth Seal"	Jon Cassar	Donald R. Boyle	April 26, 1997
Mitch is possessed by a demon that needs a sacrifice to solidify its base of power on Earth.
42	20	"Hot Winds"	Parker Stevenson	Chad Hayes & Carey W. Hayes	May 3, 1997
Mitch and Ryan search for the source of a desert wind that is making people go insane.
43	21	"The Vortex"	L. Lewis Stout	Donald R. Boyle	May 10, 1997
Mitch and Ryan go through a vortex and emerge twenty years in the future.
44	22	"A Thousand Words"	Tracy Lynch Britton	Story by : Maurice Hurley; Teleplay by : Maurice Hurley & Donald R. Boyle	May 17, 1997
When Ryan disappears in a haunted restaurant, Mitch enlists the aid of a psychic to find her.
