= Yasmine Bleeth =

American actress (born 1968)

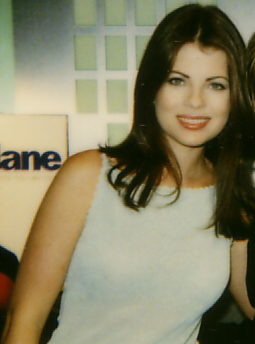
- Bleeth in 2006
- Born: June 14, 1968 (age 58); New York City, U.S.
- Occupations: Actress; model
- Years active: 1980–2003; 2020–present
- Known for: Baywatch
- Spouse: Paul Cerrito (m. 2002)

Yasmine Bleeth (born June 14, 1968) is an American actress and model. Her television roles include Caroline Holden on Baywatch, Ryan Fenelli on Ryan's Hope, Inspector Caitlin Cross on Nash Bridges and LeeAnn Demerest on One Life to Live.

== Early life and career ==
Bleeth was born in New York City. Her father, Philip, is of Russian-Jewish and German-Jewish descent. Her mother Carina was a Pied-Noir from Algeria, with French ancestry; she was Catholic. Phil Bleeth was associated with a group of friends that included Arlo Guthrie and Alice Brock (of "Alice's Restaurant" fame) around the time of Yasmine's birth. Yasmine's earliest known acting role was in a Johnson & Johnson's No More Tears baby shampoo television commercial at age 10 months in 1969. At the age of 6, she appeared on Candid Camera. Later that year she appeared in a Max Factor cosmetic advertising campaign with model Cristina Ferrare. Her work in this campaign caught the eye of fashion photographer Francesco Scavullo, who subsequently included her and her mother in his book entitled Scavullo Women.

Total Film magazine quoted Bleeth stating, "When I was a little girl I used to have to force boys to kiss me. My toughest friend had to hold them down."

In 1980, 12-year-old Bleeth was cast in her first film role, opposite Buddy Hackett in the feature film Hey Babe!. In 1983, she was in a commercial with Puerto Rican group Menudo. At age 16, she began appearing as grown up Ryan Fenelli on the daytime soap opera Ryan's Hope in February 1985 until the soap's final episode on January 13, 1989. A few months after that show's 1989 cancellation, Bleeth's mother, Carina Bleeth, was diagnosed with inflammatory breast cancer. She died within a year at the age of 47, after which Bleeth dealt with her grief, thus: "I stayed home, watching cooking shows, taking walks." She turned down acting offers for eight months, but then won the role of LeeAnn Demerest on the daytime soap opera One Life to Live.

== Later career ==
Bleeth's role of Caroline Holden on Baywatch brought her widespread attention. People named her one of magazine's 50 Most Beautiful People in 1995. She was one of FHM's 100 Sexiest Women in the World every year from 1996 to 2001, and FHM's "U.S. 100 Sexiest Women" every year from 2000 to 2003. As a result of her role in Baywatch, Bleeth was offered other roles in television and film. She has been a featured actress in five series and has guest-starred in other shows. During her television career, she continued to work as a model, frequently appearing in swimwear or lingerie. She once had her own line of swimwear called Yaz Wear. From 1998 to 2000, Bleeth played the role of inspector Caitlin Cross on Nash Bridges.

Bleeth accepted a starring role in the short-lived series Titans in 2000. Aaron Spelling was so eager to cast Bleeth in the role of a vixen on Titans that his company convinced CBS to grant her an early release from her Nash Bridges contract. In an interview with writer Dennis Hensley, she said she delighted in her over-the-top depiction of a crazed beauty queen in the 1997 TV film Crowned and Dangerous. She said, "I keep my crown from that film on my desk in a little Lucite box. My little brother tried it on once, and I screamed at him, 'Take it off! Take it off!' I get a little nasty about my crown."

Following her first effort in a drug rehabilitation clinic in late 2000 (see below), Bleeth only shot one more performance, the 2003 television film Baywatch: Hawaiian Wedding.

Bleeth made her comeback after a lengthy hiatus with a 2021 indie comedy Whack the Don.

== Personal life ==
Bleeth met her future husband, strip club owner Paul Cerrito, in December 2000 when she voluntarily entered the Malibu-based Promises Rehabilitation Clinic to overcome a cocaine dependence. Bleeth would later comment, "They say you shouldn't get into any relationship in the first year of sobriety — especially with someone in the program, but Paul and I fell in love immediately." They were married in Santa Barbara, California, on August 25, 2002, and now live in Los Angeles and Scottsdale, Arizona. Bleeth and Cerrito do not have children.

=== Charity work ===
Bleeth was the 1998 spokesperson for the Lee National Denim Day fundraising campaign, which raises money for breast cancer research and education. On October 9, 1998, it was called the "Wear Jeans to Work" campaign. With Bleeth's help, $5 million was raised on that one day to help Susan G. Komen for the Cure.

=== Cocaine addiction and arrest ===
In December 2000, Bleeth voluntarily entered the Malibu-based Promises Rehabilitation Clinic to overcome a cocaine dependence. On September 12, 2001, Bleeth was arrested in Romulus, Michigan, after she drove her car off the highway onto a median strip on Interstate 94 as she and her future husband, Paul Cerrito, were heading to Detroit Metropolitan Airport. No other cars were involved. Police found four syringes with an injectable form of cocaine in them and a small plastic bag with cocaine residue on it. The next day police conducted a search of her hotel room, where they discovered more cocaine and drug paraphernalia. In November 2001, through a plea bargain, Bleeth pleaded guilty to possessing less than 25 grams of cocaine and to driving while impaired. She was sentenced in January 2002 to two years of probation and 100 hours of community service, and was required to submit to regular drug tests and pay court costs. At the hearing she told the court: "I have been sober four months. I am sorry."

Bleeth's lawyer, Jerry Sabbota, stated after sentencing that the actress was satisfied with the plea bargain, noting that her record will be cleared of any felonies after she fulfills the terms of her probation. "When all is said and done she'll have a traffic ticket on her record. She wasn't treated any better than anyone else, and she wasn't treated any worse," Sabbota said. Her attorney stated that Bleeth was receiving therapy from the founder of the Promises Rehabilitation Clinic that she had previously attended in 2000. Bleeth completely fulfilled the terms of her probation as of January 2004, and her record was cleared as determined by the plea bargain. In an issue of Glamour from April 2003, Bleeth wrote a three-page article titled "Back from My Drugs Hell" about her rocky path to recovery, her cocaine addiction, and her struggle to remain sober. Bleeth wrote that her cocaine habit was so severe that she collapsed at a photo shoot for Glamour, and she went without sleep for five days at a time. She wrote that "consciously trying to stay off drugs is now part of my life and always will be".

== Filmography ==
=== Film ===
Year	Title	Role	Notes
1983	Hey Babe!	Theresa O'Brian	
1994	The Force	Coral Wilson	Direct-to-video
1996	Heaven or Vegas	Rachel	
1998	BASEketball	Jenna Reed	
1999	Coming Soon	Mimi	
1999	Undercover Angel	Holly Anderson	
2003	Game Over	Jo	Direct-to-video; Bleeth's parts were filmed in 1996

=== Television ===
Year	Title	Role	Notes
1985–1989	Ryan's Hope	Ryan Fenelli	
1991–1993	One Life to Live	LeeAnn Demerest Buchanan	
1993	Herman's Head	Linda	Episode: "An Actor Prepares"
1993–1997	Baywatch	Caroline Holden	main (seasons 5-7); guest/recurring (season 4, 8)
1995	Baywatch the Movie: Forbidden Paradise	Caroline Holden	TV film
1995	Boy Meets World	Herself	Episode: The Thrilla in Phila
1996	Baywatch Nights	Caroline Holden	Episode: "The Curator"
1996	A Face to Die For	Emily Gilmore	TV film
1996	Talk to Me	Diane Shepherd	TV film
1997	The Naked Truth	Natalie	Episode: "The Dating Game"
1997	Crowned and Dangerous	Danielle Stevens	TV film
1998	The Lake	Jackie Ivers	TV film
1998	Veronica's Closet	Katerena	Episode: "Veronica's a Drag"
1998	Nash Bridges	Inspector Caitlin Cross	main (seasons 4–5)
1999	Ultimate Deception	Terry Cuff	TV film
1999	It Came from the Sky	Pepper Upper	TV film
1999	Road Rage	Ellen Carson	TV film
2000	Goodbye Casanova	Lavinia	TV film
2000	Hidden War	Alexia Forman	TV film
2000	Titans	Heather Lane-Williams	Main cast
2002	V.I.P.	Kristen Grayson	Episode: "Miss Con-Jeanie-Ality"
2003	Baywatch: Hawaiian Wedding	Caroline Holden	TV film

=== Video games ===
- Maximum Surge (cancelled) – Jo

=== Theatre ===
- Welcome to My Life (October 1991). Starring role; a series of three one-act plays written by Charlie Loventhal (Second Stage Theater, New York, New York, USA)

=== Music videos ===
- Bleeth appeared in The Rembrandts' video "This House is Not a Home", a follow-up song to their single "I'll Be There for You".

== Awards and nominations ==
Soap Opera Digest Awards

- 1986: Nominated, "Outstanding Youth Actor/Actress on a Daytime or Prime Time Serial" – Ryan's Hope
- 1993: Nominated, "Hottest Female Star" – One Life to Live
