= Jeremy Jackson =

American actor and singer (born 1980)

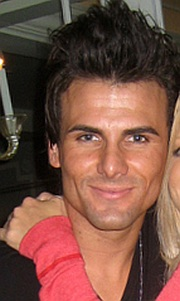
- Jackson at the Baywatch Reunion DVD release party, October 2006
- Born: Jeremy Dunn Jackson; October 16, 1980 (age 46); Newport Beach, California, U.S.
- Occupations: Actor, singer
- Years active: 1987–present
- Spouse: Loni Willison (m. 2012–2014)

Jeremy Dunn Jackson (born October 16, 1980) is an American former actor and singer. He is best known for his role as Hobie Buchannon on the television show Baywatch.

== Career ==
=== Child acting and singing ===
Jackson began working in commercials for Mattel at six, appearing in over 30 of their commercials. In 1991, Jackson landed the starring role of Hobie Buchannon in the syndicated drama series Baywatch, beating out then-15-year-old Leonardo DiCaprio for the role at the request of David Hasselhoff, who thought the character should be younger, and appearing in 159 episodes from seasons 2 through 10 (1991–1999); making him the second longest-serving cast member besides Hasselhoff, who played his father, Mitch Buchannon. In 1992, Jackson joined Hasselhoff in the Christmas short film The Bulkin Trail, alongside Sally Kirkland.

In 1994, with the encouragement of Hasselhoff, Jackson pursued music and signed to Edel Records by Peter Lopez. His debut album, Number One, produced by Australian musician Mark Holden, was released the same year and achieved moderate success in Europe, reaching Number 17 on the Dutch charts and Number 90 in Germany. The following year, he released his sophomore album, Always. Once again produced by Holden, the album did not receive commercial success.

In 1999, he abruptly quit Baywatch after he felt he was above the show, telling People, "I walked off one day with my middle finger up in the air, saying, 'Screw you, I'm not coming back to this set.' And I pulled myself off the show."

=== Decline and reality television ===
After departing Baywatch, Jackson participated in very few low budget and direct-to-video films. In 2004, he appeared in the TV movie Ring of Darkness as Xavier. Jackson was featured in Vanity Fair's Hollywood Issue in March 2006. He has been referred to as "Mr. MySpace" and was a guest on The Tyra Banks Show. Jackson has performed in clubs from London to Las Vegas. Jackson endorsed Ed Hardy Clothing, and has hosted fashion shows around the world for the fashion house.

In 2009, he appeared on VH1's Confessions of a Teen Idol, a reality show in which former teen idols attempt to revitalize their careers. In 2011, he joined the reality television series Celebrity Rehab with Dr. Drew for its fifth season for his use of steroids. In 2012, he played Kevin in the Logo TV gay-drama series DTLA. The same year, Jackson worked with PhilaDreams Films on the unreleased independent movie, Dreams, which was filmed by Thomas J. Walton and Vaughn Goland.

In January 2015, Jackson was announced as a Housemate for the fifteenth series of Celebrity Big Brother UK; on Day 4, he was removed from the house after he exposed fellow housemate Chloe Goodman's breast from her robe while he was inebriated. After his removal, he was given a police caution for common assault.

== Discography ==
=== Albums ===
- Number One (1994) NL No. 17, DE No. 90
- Always (1995)

=== Singles ===
- "I Need You" (1994)
- "Looking for My Number 1" (1994)
- "You Can Run" (1995)
- "French Kiss" (1995)
- "I'm Gonna Miss You" (1995)
- "You Really Got It Going On" (1997)

== Personal life ==
In 2008, a sex tape of Jackson and adult video star Sky Lopez was offered for sale. Jackson asserted that he was physically threatened into giving the tape to men who claimed they represented Lopez.

In an interview on the E! TV special Child Star Confidential Jackson stated that problems with drugs contributed to his departure from Baywatch, but that he had overcome his addiction following rehabilitation. In 2011, Jackson was a fifth-season cast member on Celebrity Rehab with Dr. Drew, which depicted his recovery from steroid addiction.

He was married to former model Loni Willison from 2012 to 2014. Willison struggled with drug addiction, then after their divorce became homeless in Los Angeles.

In 2017, as part of a plea bargain, Jackson was sentenced to 270 days in jail for a 2015 stabbing.

In 2024, the actor confessed in the TV docu-series After Baywatch: Moment in the Sun that he was using meth during his final season on Baywatch.

== Filmography ==
- Santa Barbara (1984) TV Series Young Derek Griffin (1990)
- Shout (1991) (V) Young BellRinger
- Baywatch (TV) Hobie Buchannon No. 2 (1991–1999)
- The Bulkin Trail (1992) (TV) Young Michael Bulkin
- Thunder Alley (1994) (TV) Danny
- Baywatch: White Thunder at Glacier Bay (1998) (V) Hobie Buchannon
- The E! True Hollywood Story: Baywatch (2001) (TV) Himself
- Baywatch: Hawaiian Wedding (2003) (TV) Hobie Buchannon
- Ring of Darkness (2004) (V) Xavier
- Expose (2005) (V) Jake Stevens
- Child Star Confidential Teen Idol – E! Entertainment TV (2006) (TV) Himself
- The Tyra Banks Show (2006) (TV) Himself
- The Big Idea with Donny Deutsch CNBC (2006) (TV) Himself
- The View ABC (2006) (TV) Himself
- The Loop g4tv (2006) (TV) Himself
- The E! True Hollywood Story: David Hasselhoff (2006) (TV) Himself
- The Rachael Ray Show (2009) (TV) Himself
- The Tyra Banks Show (2009) (TV) Himself
- Confessions of a Teen Idol (2009) (TV) Himself
- The Untitled Kris Black Project (2010) (V) Caleb
- Celebrity Rehab with Dr. Drew (2011) Himself
- DTLA (2012) Kevin
- Dreams (2013) DJ Smoove
- Celebrity Big Brother UK (2015) (TV) Himself
