= The Bulkin Trail =

1992 television film

- Directed by: Michael J Nathanson
- Written by: Michael J Nathanson; Mitchell Newman
- Produced by: Michael J Nathanson; Mitchell Newman
- Starring: David Hasselhoff; Tony Burton; Sally Kirkland; Jeremy Jackson; Michael Stephenson
- Release date: 1992
- Running time: 25 minutes
- Country: United States
- Language: English

The Bulkin Trail is a 1992 Christmas short film directed by Michael J. Nathanson.

The movie stars David Hasselhoff and centers around a man named Dimitri and his younger sister, Evelyn.

Parts of the film were shot in Park City, Utah.

In 1994, the film was nominated for a Young Artist Award for Outstanding Family TV Special, M.O.W. or Mini-Series.
