= The Thing Below =

- A DVD cover bearing the film's Canadian title, Sea Ghost
- Directed by: Jim Wynorski (as Jay Andrews)
- Written by: Raul Inglis; Keith Shaw (as Lindsay James); William Langlois (uncredited)
- Produced by: James Shavick; Kirk Shaw
- Starring: Michael Rogers; Billy Warlock; Warren Christie; Kurt Max Runte; Catherine Lough Haggquist; Peter Graham-Gaudreau
- Cinematography: Pieter Stathis
- Edited by: Richard Benwick
- Production companies: Hellfire Productions; Insight Film Studios; Movie Central Network
- Distributed by: Insight Films
- Release dates: January 7, 2004 (United States); January 28, 2004 (Canada)
- Running time: 94 minutes
- Country: Canada
- Language: English

The Thing Below is a 2004 horror film directed by Jim Wynorski and starring Billy Warlock. It also has the alternate titles It Waits Below and Sea Ghost in Canada, and Ghost Rig 2: The Legend of the Sea Ghost in the UK on DVD.

== Plot ==
A top secret drilling platform in the Gulf of Mexico raises a dormant alien creature from the depths. Once loose, the creature goes on a murderous rampage by telepathically exploiting the fears and desires of anyone to cross its path.

== Cast ==
- Billy Warlock as Captain Jack Griffin
- Michael Rogers as Mr. Paul
- Warren Christie as Cassidy
- Catherine Lough Haggquist as Anna Davis
- Kurt Max Runte as Crank Wowchowski
- Peter Graham-Gaudreau as Dean Rieser

== Production ==
The film used locations in Vancouver and British Columbia.
