= Angelica Bridges =

American actress

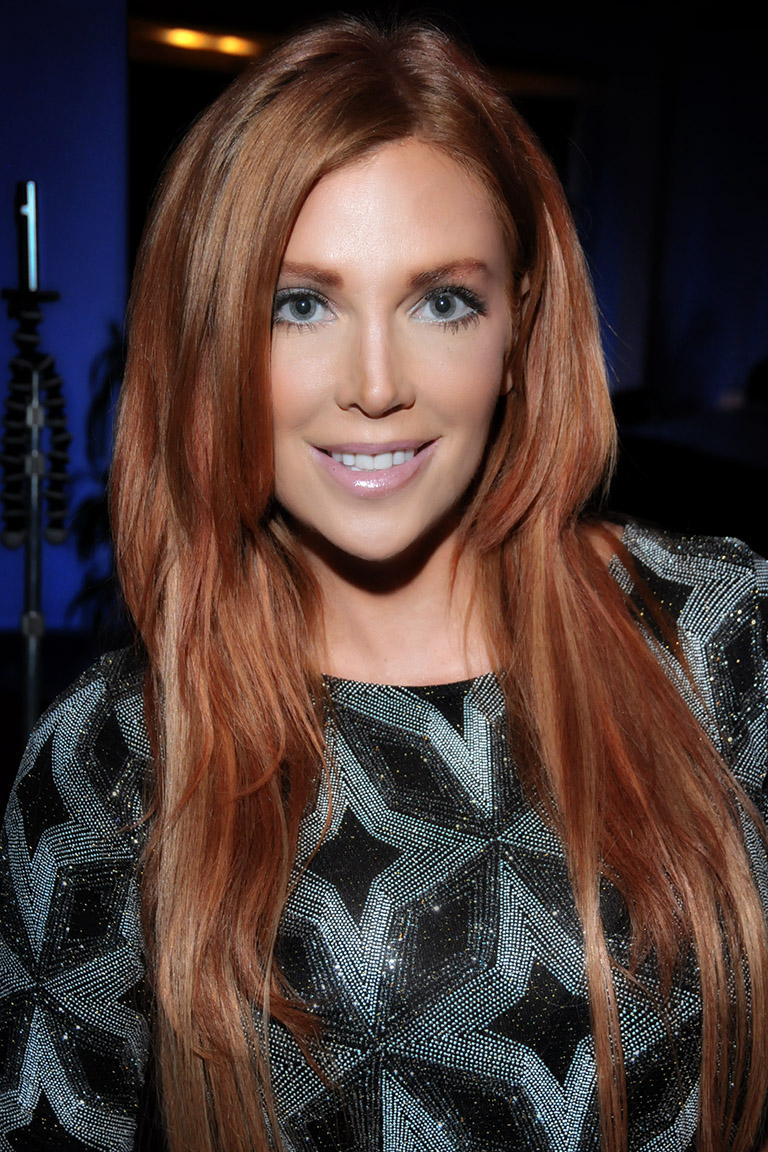
- Angelica Bridges, December 4, 2014
- Born: Angelica Jo Bridges; November 20, 1970 (age 55); Harrisonville, Missouri, U.S.
- Occupations: Actress; model; singer
- Years active: 1995–present
- Spouse: Sheldon Souray (m. 2002; div. 2007)
- Children: 2
- Website: angelicabridges.com

Angelica Bridges (born November 20, 1970) is an American actress, model, and singer. Bridges is best known for her role as Lt. Taylor Walsh on Baywatch.

== Career ==
Bridges was crowned Miss Missouri Teen. After arriving in Hollywood, Bridges signed with Elite Model Management. Bridges starred opposite Troy Aikman in a Brut cologne commercial directed by Zack Snyder. She was a ballroom dancing ingénue in an Emmy-nominated Super Bowl ad for American Express directed by David Kellog titled American Express – Virtual Reality.

She was one of the first female models to represent the UFC in an ad campaign titled “Beauty and The Beast" in Maxim magazine. She had a three-year contract with Clairol. She starred alongside Kevin Costner in a print and television ad campaign for Italian shoe company Valverde.

Bridges was voted as one of the 50 Most Watched Women in the World, by Esquire magazine, one of the 100 Most Beautiful Women in the World by FHM magazine and as one of the, 50 Sexiest Women in the World, by Maxim magazine.

Aside from being a regular on the television series Baywatch, Bridges returned to her character Lt. Taylor Walsh for the made for tv movie, Baywatch: Hawaiian Wedding, which was filmed in Hawaii and also aired on Fox.

Bridges has portrayed Red Sonja on screen, which was on the syndicated television series Conan the Barbarian.

Bridges was given a pictorial spread in Playboy magazine's November 2001 issue and featured as the issue's cover model.

Bridges has had recurring roles on The Days of our Lives, The Bold and The Beautiful, and Mortal Kombat. She has guest-starred on television shows, including, NYPD Blue, That 70's Show, Veronica Mars, Kitchen Confidential, Son of the Beach, Quintuplets, VIP, Suddenly Susan, Pacific Blue, Cybill, Metropolitan Hospital, The New Mike Hammer, Ask Harriett and Battle of the Bling on HGTV.

Bridges appeared in a 2016 episode of Million Dollar Matchmaker (S1E10).

Bridges hosted the weekly series Spice. On VH1 in the UK. She was the series regular host for TBS's Big PlayStation Saturday and hosted an episode of Talk Soup as well as The Elite Model Look of the Year. She has been a correspondent and a red-carpet interviewer for The Young Hollywood Awards, The Breakthrough of the Year Awards. She has hosted her own segments, Top Secret Beaches and Beach Week for the Travel Channel.

Bridges was the lead singer of the pop group Strawberry Blonde. She previously starred in the Luxor show Fantasy in Las Vegas, albeit not as one of the dancers; she was the presenter and headlining singer.

== Personal life ==
Bridges was married to former NHL hockey player Sheldon Souray in 2002. Bridges filed for divorce in 2005, and the divorce was finalized in 2007. They have two daughters, Valentina and Scarlett.

== Filmography ==
=== Film ===
Year	Title	Role	Notes
1995	California Heat	Lisa	
1999	Mystery Men	Furry	
2001	Vegas, City of Dreams	Masseuse	
2001	The Last Will	Nicole	
2002	Do It for Uncle Manny	Redhead in Bar	
2002	The Month of August	Emily	
2003	Baywatch: Hawaiian Wedding	Taylor Walsh	TV movie
2004	The Least Likely Candidate	Glory	
2014	The Rent	Alana	Short
2015	Batgirl Rises	Poison Ivy	Video
2017	Axeman 2: Overkill	Dungie	
2018	Louder	Stella's Best Friend	
2019	The Letter Red	Jenny	
2019	Your Family or Your Life	Erica Hearns	TV movie
2021	Sarogeto	Cindy Warburton	
2023	Axeman at Cutters Creek 2	Dungie	

=== Television ===
Year	Title	Role	Notes
1996	The Young and the Restless	Melissa	Episode: "Episode #1.5924"
1996	Days of Our Lives	Sharon Taylor	Regular Cast
1996	Silk Stalkings	Ashley 'Buffy' Dodd	Episode: "When She Was Bad"
1996	Pacific Blue	Ginger Delvecchio	Episode: "Genuine Heroes"
1996	NYPD Blue	Bartender	Episode: "Yes, We Have No Cannolis"
1996	Night Stand	Mary Kate	Episode: "Militia Babes"
1997	Cybill	Katrinka	Episode: "Little Bo Beep"
1997	Sunset Beach	Girl at Party	Episode: "Episode #1.61"
1997–98	Baywatch	Taylor Walsh	Main Cast: Season 8
1998	Ask Harriet	Herself	Episode: "Lips That Pass in the Night"
1998	Suddenly Susan	Anya	Episode: "The Big Shalom"
1998	Mike Hammer, Private Eye	Girl in Towel	Episode: "The Life You Save"
1998	Conan the Adventurer	Red Sonja	Episode: "Red Sonja"
1998–99	Mortal Kombat Conquest	Omegis	Recurring Cast
1999	Penn & Teller's Sin City Spectacular	Herself	Episode: "Episode #1.23"
2000	V.I.P.	Cleo Robbins	Episode: "Vallery's Secret"
2000	That 70s Show	Model	Episode: "Hyde's Father"
2001	The Test	Herself/Panelist	Episode: "The Foreplay Test"
2001	Black Scorpion	Shreik	Episode: "Face the Music"
2001–02	Son of the Beach	Areola	Guest Cast: Season 2-3
2003	Ripley's Believe It or Not!	Herself/Judge	Episode: "Season Premiere!"
2004	Quintuplets	Lynn	Episode: "Get a Job"
2004	The Bold and the Beautiful	Paige	Regular Cast
2005	Poorman's Bikini Beach	Benchwarmer Model	Episode: "Episode #7.2"
2005	Kitchen Confidential	Mrs. Goldfarb	Episode: "Dinner Date with Death"
2006	Veronica Mars	Sugar Jones	Episode: "The Rapes of Graff"
2008	I Love the New Millennium	Herself	Episode: "2001" & "2003"
2009	Hannity	Herself/Panelist	Episode: "December 29, 2009"
2014	Unusually Thicke	Tanya's Friend	Episode: "Off the Grid"
2016	Million Dollar Matchmaker	Herself	Episode: "The Doormat and the Lazy Lion"
2016	Deadly Sins	Kelley Brennan	Episode: "What's Mine Is Mine"
2017	Kicking & Screaming	Herself	Main Cast

== See also ==
- FHM 100 Sexiest Women in the World 1998
- FHM-US's 100 Sexiest Women 2003
