= Stacy Kamano =

American actress

Stacy Kamano is an American television actress known for her role as Kekoa Tanaka on Baywatch.

== Career ==
Kamano joined the cast of the television series Baywatch in 1999, playing the role of lifeguard Kekoa Tanaka. Kamano was a cast member in the show's final two seasons. Kamano has also hosted the television series Extreme Sports and Hotlines.

== Partial filmography ==
Year	Title	Role	Notes
1999–2001	Baywatch	Kekoa Tanaka	44 episodes
1999	Search Party	Celebrity contestant	TV series, 2 episodes
2000	Hottie Boombalottie	Herself	Music video of American rapper KEF
2003	Baywatch: Hawaiian Wedding	Kekoa Tanaka	TV movie
2003	Return to the Batcave: The Misadventures of Adam and Burt	Nghara Frisbie-West	TV movie
2003	Hotlines	Host	TV series
2007	The Bold and the Beautiful	Secretary Molly	Episode #1.5015 =
