= American Express – Virtual Reality =

Television advertisement

- Agency: Ogilvy & Mather, New York
- Language: English
- Running time: 1:01
- Product: Credit card
- Release date: 1998
- Slogan: "Do more"
- Written by: Jim Jenkins
- Directed by: David Kellogg
- Music by: Craig Snyder
- Starring: Raymond O'Connor; Angelica Bridges; Brian Klugman
- Production company: Propaganda Films, Los Angeles
- Produced by: Brendan O'Malley
- Country: United States

"American Express – Virtual Reality" is the name of a television advertisement for the American Express multinational financial services corporation, created in 1998. Directed by David Kellogg, the spot is one in a series of Visa-bashing ads.

== Synopsis ==
A man (Raymond O'Connor) finds happiness in a romantic fantasy of himself ballroom dancing in the arms of a red-haired beauty (Angelica Bridges), until a store clerk (Brian Klugman) yanks the virtual reality device that produced her. The clerk tells the man that he put himself above his Visa credit card limit. Unlike Visa, American Express has no pre-set limits. A tug-of-war ensues between the man and the clerk, which ultimately results in the police being called.

== Reception ==
The commercial was nominated for an Emmy for Outstanding Commercial, ultimately losing out to Apple Computer's "Think Different" advertisement.

Angelica Bridges was compared to a modern-day Ginger Rogers. Meanwhile, according to the Los Angeles Times, this particular ad helped Raymond O'Connor, the hapless Visa user, land a role in the film My Giant.

== See also ==
- Virtual reality in fiction
- Dance in film#Ballroom
- American Express#Advertising campaigns
