= Lover's Knot (film) =

1995 romantic comedy film

- Directed by: Pete Shaner
- Written by: Pete Shaner
- Produced by: Paul A. Kaufman
- Starring: Jennifer Grey; Billy Campbell; Tim Curry
- Cinematography: Garett Griffin
- Edited by: Tatiana S. Riegel
- Music by: Laura Karpman
- Production company: Two Pauls Entertainment
- Distributed by: Legacy Releasing
- Release dates: September 1995 (Temecula Valley International Film Festival); July 12, 1996 (United States)
- Running time: 82 minutes
- Country: United States
- Language: English

Lover's Knot is a 1995 American romantic comedy film written and directed by Pete Shaner and starring Jennifer Grey, Billy Campbell, and Tim Curry.

== Plot ==
An angel oversees the romantic relationship between two lovers to prevent them from breaking up.

== Cast ==
- Jennifer Grey as Megan Forester
- Billy Campbell as Steve Hunter
- Tim Curry as Cupid's Caseworker
- Adam Baldwin as John Reed
- Mark Sheppard as Nigel
- Tom McTigue as Doug Meyers
- Holly Fulger as Gwen Meyers
- Kristin Minter as Cheryl
- Elaine Hendrix as Robin
- Adam Ant as Marvell
- Joyce Brothers as Herself
- Anne Francis as Marian Hunter
- Harold Gould as Alan Smithee
- Byrne Piven as William Shakespeare
- Sheryl Lee Ralph as Charlotte
- Zelda Rubenstein as Woman in Clinic
- Dawn Wells as Mary Ann

== Release ==
Lover's Knot premiered at the first annual Temecula Valley International Film Festival in 1995. It was also reviewed at the 1996 Cannes Film Festival's Marché du Film. It was given a limited release in the United States on July 12, 1996 by Legacy Releasing.

== Reception ==
Kevin Thomas for the Los Angeles Times wrote that the film "is so marginal that its theatrical release is sheerest folly." In a similarly lukewarm review, Skip Sheffield of the Boca Raton News wrote that Lover's Knot "has an annoying and intrusive central gimmick." For Variety, Deborah Young wrote that "despite Tim Curry's Brit accent, Lover's Knot is pure American collegiate humor."
