= Michael Bergin =

American real Trader and former actor and model

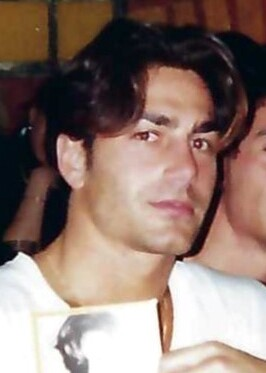
- Michael Bergin in 1996
- Born: Michael John Bergin; March 18, 1969 (age 57); Waterbury, Connecticut, U.S.
- Spouse: Joy Tilk (m. 2004)
- Children: 2

Michael John Bergin (born March 18, 1969) is an American actor, real estate agent and former model.

== Early life ==
Born in Naugatuck, Connecticut, Bergin attended the University of Connecticut. He began modeling while in college.

== Career ==
Bergin is perhaps best known as Mark Wahlberg's successor in Calvin Klein's racy series of black-and-white underwear ads. In addition to his high-profile role as the "spokesbody" for Calvin Klein, Bergin has walked the runways of New York City, Paris and Milan for Sonia Rykiel, Valentino, Calvin Klein, Gianfranco Ferré, Giorgio Armani, Yves Saint Laurent and Donna Karan and was the exclusive model for Claiborne for Men, a division of Liz Claiborne, Inc., for over three years. He has also appeared in commercials and print advertisements for Kellogg's, Bacardi Rum, L'Oréal, Maybelline, Coty, Valentino, Perry Ellis, and Liz Claiborne. Bergin is signed to Wilhelmina Models in New York City, and New York Model Management.

Apart from the fashion industry, Bergin also ventured into acting, playing the character J.D. Darius on Baywatch and later Baywatch: Hawaii for 88 episodes from 1997 to 2001, and starring as the same character in the made-for-TV Film Baywatch: Hawaiian Wedding in 2003.

In 2006, he appeared on VH1's sci-fi celeb reality show Celebrity Paranormal Project. Bergin later launched his own brand of men's underwear.

Bergin now works as a real estate agent in Beverly Hills.

On May 29, 2026, it was announced that Bergin will reprise his role as J.D. Darius on Baywatch rebooted series in a recurring role.

== Personal life ==
In the early 1990s, Bergin met Carolyn Bessette, a Calvin Klein publicist, whom he dated seriously, despite her burgeoning relationship with John F. Kennedy Jr., whom she later married in September 1996. Kennedy and Bessette-Kennedy died in a plane crash in July 1999. In early 2004, Bergin published a book about his relationship with Bessette, The Other Man, claiming that they continued a sexual affair during the time Bessette was dating Kennedy and during their marriage.

On September 24, 2004, Bergin married makeup artist Joy Tilk with whom he has two children (Jesse b. October 8, 2000; Alana b. February 16, 2004).

Bergin has worked with the anti-drug children's program D.A.R.E. as a national spokesperson, and has lent his name, time, and image to numerous AIDS charities.

== In popular culture ==
Bergin is portrayed by Noah Fearnley in the 2026 television mini-series Love Story.
