= Noah Fearnley =

American actor (born 1999

- Fearnley in 2026
- Born: June 28, 1999 (age 27); Orange, Connecticut
- Occupation: Actor

Noah Fearnley (born June 28, 1999) is an American actor in both traditional works and microdramas. He is best known for his role as Michael Bergin in Love Story, and for his roles in numerous microdramas.

== Biography ==
Fearnley was born on June 28, 1999 in Orange, Connecticut, and also grew up in Orange. He attended Endicott College, where he played college football but got injured, and ultimately transferred to the University of Tampa, where he received a scholarship for lacrosse. He has stated that he then worked as a model and studied acting in Miami before moving to Hollywood.

He then began acting in films, appearing as Shane in the Lifetime film The Wrong Cheer Captain, as Becker in Infamously in Love, as Jonathan in Dognapped: Hound for the Holidays, as main character Jacob in Lifetime film Mother's Deadly Son, as Aiden in Lifetime film Secrets in the Building, in Lifetime film Black Girl Missing, and as main character Cade in Lifetime film A Lifeguard's Obsession. He made his TV debut in a series called Morgan's Secret Admirer.

In 2023, he received an offer for a romantic lead role in a microdrama, and although he was unsure about it, he ultimately decided to accept due to a lack of recent Lifetime movie offers as a result of the 2023 SAG-AFTRA strike. He subsequently became one of the most popular actors in microdramas, appearing in over fifty of them. Microdrama reviewer Erin E. Gross stated, in regards to him, "It doesn't matter what role, he's so fun."

He was described as instantly recognisable, and he, along with other notable lead actors, has been cited as one of the biggest drives for fans to watch microdramas. He has claimed part of the appeal of microdramas is looking towards the past, referring to when actors worked with a single studio.

In 2026, he played Michael Bergin, Carolyn Bessette Kennedy's ex-boyfriend, in Love Story. He subsequently went to personally meet Bergin, who stated that he "has all the makings of an A lister".

He is signed to Armada Partners for representation.

== Personal life ==
According to Reelshort, one of the companies he acts for, he is married. However, he has personally asserted that he is single. During an interview with On Air with Ryan Seacrest, it was revealed to him that he had matched with one of their producers on Raya.
