= Baywatch Nights =

American television series

- Genre: Action; Crime drama; Science fiction
- Created by: Michael Berk; Gregory J. Bonann; David Hasselhoff; Douglas Schwartz
- Starring: David Hasselhoff; Gregory Alan Williams; Angie Harmon; Lisa Stahl; Lou Rawls; Eddie Cibrian; Donna D'Errico; Dorian Gregory
- Opening theme: "After the Sun Goes Down" performed by Lou Rawls (season one) "The Nights Will Never Be the Same", performed by Alfonzo Blackwell (season two)
- Ending theme: "Into the Night", performed by David Hasselhoff (season one) "The Nights Will Never Be the Same" (short version), performed by Alfonzo Blackwell (season two)
- Composers: John D'Andrea; Tom Harriman; Mark Holden; Cory Lerios; Matthias Weber
- Country of origin: United States
- Original language: English
- No. of seasons: 2
- No. of episodes: 44 (list of episodes)

Production
- Executive producers: Michael Berk; Gregory J. Bonann; David Hasselhoff; Maurice Hurley; Douglas Schwartz
- Producers: John F. Burnett; Francis Conway; James Pergola; Bruce A. Pobjoy
- Running time: 45–48 minutes
- Production companies: The Baywatch Company; Tower 12 Productions; Tower 18 Productions Company (1996–1997)

Original release
- Network: Syndication
- Release: September 30, 1995 – May 17, 1997

Related
- Baywatch

Baywatch Nights is an American science-fiction mystery drama television series that aired in syndication from 1995 to 1997. Created by Douglas Schwartz, David Hasselhoff, and Gregory J. Bonann, the series is a spin-off from the television series, Baywatch.

== Synopsis ==
The original premise of the series was that during a midlife crisis, Sgt. Garner Ellerbee (Gregory Alan Williams), who was the resident police officer of Baywatch since the beginning of the series, decides to quit his job as a police officer and form a detective agency. Mitch Buchannon (David Hasselhoff), his friend from Baywatch, joins to support him and they are, in turn, joined by a detective named Ryan McBride (Angie Harmon). Singer Lou Rawls, who starred in the first season, performed the series theme song, "After the Sun Goes Down", alongside David Hasselhoff. Rawls played the role of Lou Raymond, owner of the nightclub where the detective agency rented its office. Midway into the first season, the series added two new cast members: Eddie Cibrian and Donna D'Errico.

For the second season, facing slipping ratings which were never as good as the original series', the producers decided to switch to a science-fiction format (inspired by the success of The X-Files). Gregory Alan Williams left the series and was replaced by Dorian Gregory as Diamont Teague, a paranormal expert. The new format did not help the series and it was canceled after the second season. The character Donna Marco was later carried over to the original Baywatch series afterwards.

== Episodes ==
Season	Episodes	Originally released	
Season	Episodes	First released	Last released
1	22	September 30, 1995	May 18, 1996
2	22	September 28, 1996	May 17, 1997

== Cast ==
- David Hasselhoff as Mitch Buchannon
- Gregory Alan Williams as Garner Ellerbee (season 1)
- Angie Harmon as Ryan McBride
- Lisa Stahl as Destiny Desimone (episodes 1–10)
- Lou Rawls as Lou Raymond (season 1)
- Eddie Cibrian as Griff Walker (episodes 11–44)
- Donna D'Errico as Donna Marco (episodes 11–44)
- Dorian Gregory as Diamont Teague (season 2)

=== Guests from Baywatch ===
- Billy Warlock as Eddie Kramer (guest-starring in episode 14)
- Yasmine Bleeth as Caroline Holden (guest-starring in episode 16)
- Alexandra Paul as Stephanie Holden (guest-starring in episode 41)
- Michael Newman as Mike "Newmie" Newman (guest-starring in episodes 14, 16, and 30)

== Home video releases ==
Shock Entertainment released both seasons on DVD in Region 4 (Australia) on September 18, 2013.
