= Hey Babe! (1983 film) =

1983 Canadian musical drama film

- VHS cover, using the title Babe!
- Directed by: Rafal Zielinski
- Written by: Edith Rey
- Produced by: Arthur Veronka
- Starring: Yasmine Bleeth; Buddy Hackett
- Cinematography: Peter Czerski
- Edited by: Avdé Chiriaeff
- Music by: Gino Soccio
- Distributed by: Canadian Film Development Corporation
- Release date: 1983 (Canada)
- Running time: 101 minutes
- Country: Canada
- Language: English

Hey Babe!, also known as Babe! and also known as Rise and Shine, is a 1983 film, a musical drama starring Yasmine Bleeth and Buddy Hackett. This was Yasmine's first film at the age of 12 years.

== Plot ==
Theresa O'Brian is a 12-year-old orphan who desperately wants to attend a school for the performing arts and become a star. She is not receiving encouragement at the orphanage and is getting into trouble with the orphanage officials due to her infractions of the rules and regulations.

In one of her unauthorized adventures away from the orphanage, she meets and befriends Sammy Cohen who was a vaudeville performer who became an alcoholic and lost his career. He is interested in renewing his career and has faith in Theresa's ability, and together they develop an act called "Buddy and Babe" in order to raise money for Theresa's tuition.

== Cast ==
- Buddy Hackett as Sammy (Cohen)
- Yasmine Bleeth as Theresa (O'Brian)
- Maruska Stankova as Miss Wolf
- Vlasta Vrana as Roy
- Denise Proulx as Miss Dolphine
- Tara Lee Bell as Sandy
- Saundra Baly as Kate
- Geraldine Hunt as TV Singer
- Gordie Brown as Jean

Shot in 1979, the film was released in 1983, by which time the film's "TV Singer" Geraldine Hunt had scored a 1980 Billboard National Disco Action Top 100 number-one hit with "Can't Fake the Feeling".

== Production credits ==
- Rafal Zielinski (Director)
- Edith Rey (Writer)
- Arthur Veronka (Producer)
