= Michael Newman (actor) =

American lifeguard and actor (1957–2024)

- Born: Michael Newman; April 26, 1957; San Francisco, California, U.S.
- Died: October 20, 2024 (aged 67); Los Angeles, California, U.S.
- Occupations: Actor, firefighter, lifeguard
- Years active: 1990–2001

Michael Newman (April 26, 1957 – October 20, 2024) was an American lifeguard, firefighter and actor. He was best known for playing a fictionalized version of himself, Michael "Newmie" Newman, on the long-running television series Baywatch.

== Biography ==
Newman was born in San Francisco, California, on April 26, 1957.

Both during and after working on Baywatch, he advocated for education around water safety and first aid, including times that people credited him and Baywatch for giving them the knowledge of how to act in an emergency. After leaving the show, he worked with environmental groups to improve the water quality at beaches.

He was diagnosed with Parkinson's disease in 2006, when he was 50 and publicly spoke about the disease when promoting the documentary series After Baywatch: Moment in the Sun.

He died from heart failure at the Ronald Reagan UCLA Medical Center in Los Angeles, California, on October 20, 2024, at the age of 67.

== Filmography ==
Year	Title	Role	Notes
1989–2000	Baywatch	Michael 'Newmie' Newman	150 episodes; recurring role: seasons 1–6; main: 7–10
1999	Enemy Action	Casey	
1998	L. A. Lifeguards	Narrator	TBS documentary
1998	Welcome to Hollywood	Baywatch Lifeguard	
1998	Baywatch: White Thunder at Glacier Bay	Michael 'Newmie' Newman	
1996	Baywatch Nights	Michael 'Newmie' Newman	3 episodes
1996	Zig and Zag's Dirty Deeds	Michael Newman	1 episode
1989	Baywatch: Panic at Malibu Pier	Michael 'Newmie' Newman	Credited as "Newmie"
1989	Code Red: Moment of Survival	Host	2 episodes
