= Billy Warlock =

American actor

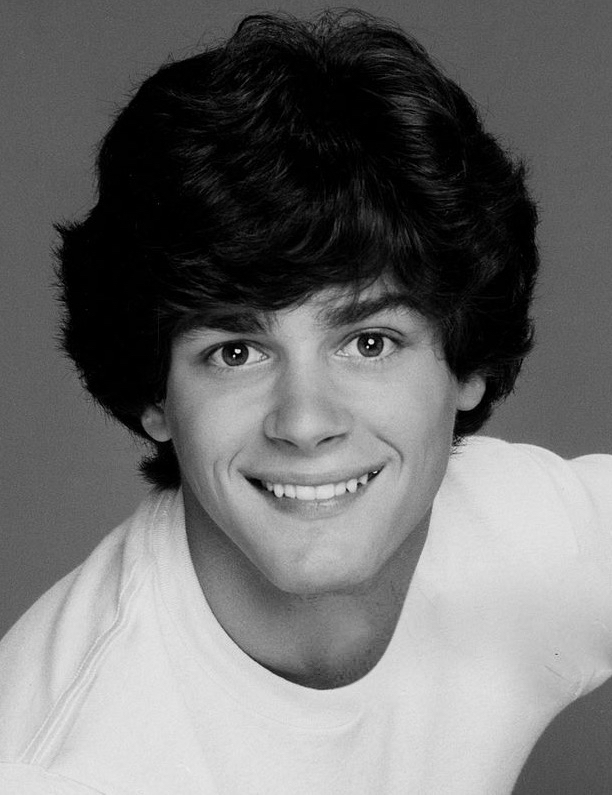
- Warlock in a promotional photo for Happy Days
- Born: William Alan Leming; March 26, 1961 (age 65); Gardena, California, U.S.
- Occupation: Actor
- Years active: 1981–2011
- Spouses: Marcy Walker (m. 1985; div. 1987) Julie Pinson (m. 2006)
- Father: Dick Warlock

William Alan Warlock (né Leming; born March 26, 1961) is a retired American actor known for playing Eddie Kramer, a lifeguard on the first three seasons of Baywatch and in the reunion movie in 2003, as well as for numerous daytime roles, most notably Frankie Brady on Days of Our Lives and A.J. Quartermaine on General Hospital. His last known acting credit was in 2011.

== Early life ==
Billy Warlock was born William Alan Leming in Gardena, California, the oldest of three siblings. He has a brother, Lance, and a sister, Rhonda. Their father, Dick Warlock (né Richard Anthony Leming), was a successful Hollywood stunt man (who did stunts for Kurt Russell and was the stunt driver in the Disney picture, The Love Bug).

After graduation from Birmingham High School in Van Nuys, California in 1979, Warlock's father landed him a stunt job as Robin Williams's stunt double in a Mork & Mindy episode, one that was produced by Garry Marshall. Several months later, Warlock auditioned for Marshall and won his first major television role as Leopold "Flip" Phillips, Roger (Ted McGinley)'s brother and Marion Cunningham (Marion Ross)'s younger nephew, in the ninth and tenth seasons of Happy Days.

== Career ==
As a young adult, Warlock had a small role in Halloween II (1981), and Lovely But Deadly (1981), directed by David Sheldon. He later appeared in Hotshot (1987), directed by Rick King, and played the lead role in the horror film Society (1989), directed by Brian Yuzna. The same year, Warlock appeared as an original cast member of Baywatch, where he played lifeguard Eddie Kramer for the first three seasons. In the early 1990s, he also was on the short-lived TV Series The Hat Squad, with Nestor Serrano and Don Michael Paul from 1992 to 1993, and portrayed Lyle Menendez in the 1994 television movie Honor Thy Father and Mother: The True Story of the Menendez Murders.

Warlock starred on soap operas such as Days of Our Lives and General Hospital. In the latter, he portrayed A. J. Quartermaine from June 13, 1997, to December 11, 2003, and for several visits in 2005 from February 4 to February 11, when his character was presumed dead. He reprised the role from March 15 until April 26 when his character was actually murdered in his hospital room by Dr. Asher Thomas (Larry Poindexter) after he kidnapped his biological son, Michael Corinthos (Dylan Cash). On Days of Our Lives, Warlock portrayed Frankie Brady from 1986 to 1988, from 1990 to 1991, and again beginning in June 2005. In 1988, he won a Daytime Emmy Award for Outstanding Younger Actor in a Drama Series at the 15th Daytime Emmy Awards for his performance on the series. He was let go from the soap and his final airdate was November 2006. In spring 2007, he joined the cast of The Young and the Restless in the role of Ben Hollander, Jack Abbott (Peter Bergman)'s campaign manager. Warlock appeared on the show from May 2007 to January 2008.

In 2003, Warlock reprised his role of Eddie Kramer in the Baywatch: Hawaiian Wedding television film. The following year, he appeared in an off-Broadway revival production of The Normal Heart at the Public Theater in New York City. Charles Isherwood of Variety praised his performance as "sincere and nicely understated." During the summer of 2010, Warlock appeared on As the World Turns as Anthony Blackthorn.

== Personal life ==
Warlock was once engaged to his Baywatch co-star Erika Eleniak, who had played his character Eddie's love interest on the show, Shauni McClain, as well. Warlock was married to soap actress Marcy Walker but they later divorced. He married former Days of our Lives and As the World Turns co-star Julie Pinson on August 26, 2006, in Las Vegas, Nevada.

== Filmography ==
=== Film ===
Year	Title	Role	Notes
1981	Halloween II	Craig	As Bill Warlock
1981	Lovely But Deadly	Boy on Beach	As Bill Warlock
1987	Hotshot	Vinnie Fortino	
1989	Society	Bill Whitney	
1995	Mr. Payback	Payton Bach	Interactive film
1997	Opposite Corners	Bryant Donatello	
1997	Steel Sharks	Bob Rogers	
2004	The Thing Below	Captain Jack Griffin	
2006	Fatwa	Vince	
2009	Hatchet Man	Boss	Short film
2011	Discedo	Robert (voice)	Short film

=== Television ===
Year	Title	Role	Notes
1982–1983	Happy Days	Leopold "Flip" Phillips	13 episodes
1983	ABC Afterschool Special	Craig Foster	Episode: "But It's Not My Fault"
1983	Lottery!	Billy	Episode: "Los Angeles: Bigger Volume"
1983	Six Pack	Duffy Akins	Television film
1984	Capitol	Ricky Driscoll	Episode: "November 1, 1984"
1986	2 1/2 Dads	Danny Selzer	Television film
1986–2006	Days of Our Lives	Frankie Brady	Main cast (589 episodes) Daytime Emmy Award for Outstanding Younger Actor in a Drama Series
1987	Rags to Riches	Tommy	Episode: "Pilot"
1989	Swimsuit	Chris	Television film
1989	Baywatch: Panic at Malibu Pier	Eddie Kramer	Television film
1989	21 Jump Street	Ron Green	Episode: "Come from the Shadows"
1989	Class Cruise	Sam McBride	Television film
1989–1992	Baywatch	Eddie Kramer	Main cast (45 episodes)
1990	TV or Not TV?	Student	Television special
1992–1993	The Hat Squad	Matty Matheson	Main cast (13 episodes)
1994	Honor Thy Father and Mother: The True Story of the Menendez Murders	Lyle Menendez	Television film
1994–1996	Silk Stalkings	Brent/Jason Hemmings	2 episodes
1995	Marker	Shawn	Episode: "Snowballs in Hawaii"
1995	NYPD Blue	Mike Barnett	Episode: "One Big Happy Family"
1996	Baywatch Nights	Eddie Kramer	Episode: "Backup"
1996	Panic in the Skies!	Matt Eisenhauer	Television film
1997–2005	General Hospital	A. J. Quartermaine	Main cast (308 episodes)
1999	Diagnosis: Murder	Derek Shaw	2 episodes
2003	Baywatch: Hawaiian Wedding	Eddie Kramer	Television film
2007–2008	The Young and the Restless	Ben Hollander	32 episodes
2009	Damages	Undercover Customer #2	Episode: "New York Sucks"
2010	As the World Turns	Anthony Blackthorn	15 episodes
2010	One Life to Live	Ross Rayburn	18 episodes

== Stage credits ==
Year	Title	Role	Notes
2004	The Normal Heart	Felix Turner	The Public Theater

Preceded by Sean Kanan	A. J. Quartermaine (role); 1997–2003; 2005	Succeeded by Sean Kanan
