= Baywatch (film) =

2017 film by Seth Gordon

- Theatrical release poster
- Directed by: Seth Gordon
- Screenplay by: Damian Shannon; Mark Swift
- Story by: Jay Scherick; David Ronn; Thomas Lennon; Robert Ben Garant
- Based on: Baywatch by: Michael Berk; Douglas Schwartz; Gregory J. Bonann
- Produced by: Ivan Reitman; Beau Flynn; Michael Berk; Douglas Schwartz; Gregory J. Bonann
- Starring: Dwayne Johnson; Zac Efron
- Cinematography: Eric Steelberg
- Edited by: Peter S. Elliot
- Music by: Christopher Lennertz
- Production companies: Paramount Pictures; Uncharted; Shanghai Film Group; Huahua Media; The Montecito Picture Company; Seven Bucks Productions; Flynn Company Co.; Fremantle Productions
- Distributed by: Paramount Pictures
- Release dates: May 13, 2017 (Miami); May 25, 2017 (United States)
- Running time: 116 minutes
- Country: United States
- Language: English
- Budget: $65–69 million
- Box office: $177.9 million

Baywatch is a 2017 American action comedy film directed by Seth Gordon, with a screenplay by Mark Swift and Damian Shannon, from a story by Jay Scherick, David Ronn, Thomas Lennon, and Robert Ben Garant. It is based on the television series of the same name created by Michael Berk, Douglas Schwartz, and Gregory J. Bonann and takes place within the same fictional universe. The film stars Dwayne Johnson and Zac Efron.

The story follows lifeguard Mitch Buchannon and his team, who must take down a drug lord in an effort to save their beach.

Principal photography began on February 22, 2016, in Florida and Savannah, Georgia. The film premiered in Miami on May 13, 2017, and was theatrically released in the United States on May 25, 2017 by Paramount Pictures. It was a commercial success, grossing $177.9 million worldwide on a $65–69 million budget, but attracted negative reviews from critics. Baywatch received five nominations at the 38th Golden Raspberry Awards, including Worst Picture and Worst Actor for Efron.

== Plot ==
In Emerald Bay, Florida, Lt. Mitch Buchannon is a beloved member of an elite lifeguard division known as Baywatch. The team, including second-in-command Stephanie Holden and veteran C. J. Parker, protects the beaches and the bay. They are opposed by jealous beat cop Garner Ellerbee and Mitch's superior, Captain Thorpe.

On morning patrol, Mitch finds a small pouch of flakka near the Huntley Club, owned by powerful businesswoman Victoria Leeds. Later, he meets Matt Brody, an entitled Olympic gold medal-winning swimmer who expects to make the Baywatch team without trying out. Mitch and Brody compete in a variety of physical tests, which Mitch wins. As the course is ending, a woman and her two children fall into the water, so the lifeguards and Brody rush to save them. Brody makes the team along with Ronnie Greenbaum and Summer Quinn.

A private yacht catches fire, and the occupants are evacuated alive by Baywatch except for city councilman Rodriguez, who dies. Suspicious, Mitch and his team continue to investigate to Ellerbee's disapproval. They infiltrate the hospital morgue, discovering that Rodriguez was murdered. The trio hides, taking a video of Leeds' henchmen planting an autopsy report to cover up the murder, but are discovered, so the recording is destroyed. Thorpe threatens to fire Mitch if he oversteps again.

Convinced Leeds is running drugs through the Huntley, Mitch, and Brody go undercover and witness drugs being retrieved from barrels of fish. When they contact Ellerbee, they learn another dead body has been found on the beach. Thorpe, enraged that Mitch deserted his post, fires him. Brody is named the new lieutenant, although he does not want the job, but is forced to take it.

Brody later sees "sand grifters" (or beach thieves) steal bags using a cooler. He chases them off the beach and keeps the cooler. After finding another pouch of flakka on the beach, Brody uses the cooler to steal the second victim's report from Ellerbee's desk. Bringing it to Summer, she confirms the man was killed by a knife instead of a shark attack.

Ronnie recognizes the victim as his friend Dave, an IT technician who was working for the Huntley Club. Now, Brody finally realizes that Mitch was right about the club. Ronnie hacks into Leeds' servers, finding her plan to privatize the entire beach.

The team infiltrates a private party on Leeds' personal yacht and discovers that she has been using the hull to smuggle kinds of drugs. Brody is captured and thrown into a bait cage. A gloating Leeds reveals she bribed Thorpe to replace Mitch with him before pushing the cage into the water. Before Brody can drown, Summer swims to him and gives him mouth-to-mouth resuscitation. However, he is hallucinating and suddenly realizes it is actually Mitch.

They catch up to Leeds before she can escape via helicopter, but she captures Brody. Mitch aims a Roman candle at her, and Ronnie and C. J. launch the fireworks, blowing her up. Ellerbee arrives, takes Leeds' henchmen into custody, and apologizes to Mitch. Thorpe arrives, berating Mitch for returning to the beach. Brody punches him in the face, and Thorpe is arrested for his role in Leeds' plan.

Sometime later, Ronnie and Brody begin relationships with C. J. and Summer, respectively. Mitch, reinstated, announces that Summer, Ronnie, and Brody are no longer trainees and introduces them to their new captain, Casey Jean.

== Cast ==
- Dwayne Johnson as Lieutenant Mitch Buchannon
- Zac Efron as Matt Brody
- Priyanka Chopra as Victoria Leeds
- Alexandra Daddario as Summer Quinn
- Kelly Rohrbach as C. J. Parker
- Jon Bass as Ronnie Greenbaum
- Ilfenesh Hadera as Stephanie Holden
- Yahya Abdul-Mateen II as Sergeant Garner Ellerbee
- Rob Huebel as Captain Thorpe
- Hannibal Buress as Dave the Tech
- Oscar Nunez as Councilman Rodriguez
- Amin Joseph as Frankie
- Jack Kesy as Leon
- Belinda Peregrín as Carmen
- Pamela Anderson as Captain Casey Jean Parker
- David Hasselhoff as The Mentor

== Production ==
=== Development ===
A Baywatch movie was first announced in 2004, although the movie became stuck in development hell over the years, with several writers penning drafts. In July 2009, it was announced that Jeremy Garelick would write and direct the movie.

In September 2012, it was announced that Reno 911! co-creator and star Robert Ben Garant would direct the film version of Baywatch for Paramount Pictures.

In October 2014, it was announced that Paramount was moving forward with its big-screen adaptation of Baywatch and had loosely attached Dwayne Johnson to the project. The studio also hired Justin Malen to rewrite and attached the comedy writing team of Sean Anders and John Morris to direct.

In July 2015, Sean Anders was replaced by Seth Gordon as director. On October 2, 2014, Dwayne Johnson was attached to star in the lead role, and Justin Malen was set to rewrite the script. Damian Shannon and Mark Swift wrote the latest draft, and the film would be comedic in style. On August 10, 2015, Zac Efron signed on to star in the film, and Beau Flynn and Ivan Reitman joined to produce with Johnson's Seven Bucks Productions. On November 9, 2015, Deadline reported that seven actresses were among the short list testing for the lead female role, Alexandra Daddario, Ashley Benson, Nina Dobrev, Alexandra Shipp, Shelley Hennig, Bianca A. Santos, and Denyse Tontz. On November 18, 2015, Johnson confirmed Daddario would play Summer, a lifeguard, and the love interest of Efron's character.

On January 4, 2016, Kelly Rohrbach's casting as C. J. Parker was confirmed by Johnson's Instagram post. Damian Shannon and Mark Swift wrote the screenplay, while the final list of producers were Johnson along with his partner Dany Garcia, through their Seven Bucks Productions, as well as Flynn, Reitman, Michael Berk, Douglas Schwartz, and Gregory J. Bonann. On January 20, 2016, Johnson again posted on his Instagram about casting Ilfenesh Hadera as Johnson's love interest. On January 27, 2016, Jon Bass was cast in the film to play Ronnie, a funny, awkward, and skilled disco dancer at the beach, who falls in love with Parker. On February 12, 2016, Hannibal Buress joined the cast of the film to play a bay community local. On February 17, 2016, Priyanka Chopra signed on to star as the antagonist in the film. The role was originally written for a male. In March 2016, Yahya Abdul-Mateen II joined the cast as Ellerbee, a police officer who is constantly reminding Mitch that being a lifeguard, he has no actual jurisdiction on the beach. Jack Kesy and Amin Joseph were also cast in the film. Vine (later YouTube) star Logan Paul announced that he was in the film, but his scenes were later cut. Izabel Goulart also appeared. NFL players Vernon Davis and Arian Foster also have cameo appearances in the film.

=== Filming ===
Principal photography on the film began on February 22, 2016, in Deerfield Beach, Florida, with the setting in Broward County, Florida, while the television series was set in Malibu, California. The film was shot in Miami and Savannah, Georgia. In late March 2016, filming started in Tybee Island, Georgia. Filming wrapped on May 18, 2016.

== Release ==
In January 2016, Paramount Pictures scheduled Baywatch for a May 19, 2017 release, which was originally scheduled for a sequel to Terminator Genisys. In December 2016, Paramount pushed the release date back one week to May 26, 2017, to avoid competition with Alien: Covenant. In April 2017, the film was moved one day earlier, to avoid direct competition with Pirates of the Caribbean: Dead Men Tell No Tales.

=== Home media ===
Baywatch was released on Digital HD on August 15, 2017 and on Blu-ray and DVD on August 29, 2017.

== Reception ==
=== Box office ===
Baywatch grossed $58.1 million in the United States and Canada and $119.8 million in other territories, for a worldwide total of $177.9 million, against a production budget of $69 million (not including marketing and distribution costs).

In the United States and Canada, the film was initially projected to gross around $40 million from 3,642 theaters over its five-day opening weekend, with the studio predicting a more conservative $30 million debut. It made $1.25 million at 2,554 theaters from Wednesday night previews, similar to fellow mid-week R-rated releases We're the Millers ($1.7 million) and Let's Be Cops ($1.2 million). However, after making $4.6 million on its opening day (including Wednesday night previews) and $5.7 million on Friday, five-day projections were lowered to $25 million. It ended up grossing $18.5 million in its opening weekend (for a five-day total of $27.7 million), finishing third at the box office, behind Pirates of the Caribbean: Dead Men Tell No Tales ($63 million) and Guardians of the Galaxy Vol. 2 ($20.9 million). In its second weekend the film grossed $8.8 million (a drop of 52.5%), finishing 5th at the box office.

=== Critical response ===
On the review aggregator website Rotten Tomatoes, 18% of 244 critics' reviews are positive, with an average rating of 4/10. The website's consensus reads: "Baywatch takes its source material's jiggle factor to R-rated levels, but lacks the original's campy charm – and leaves its charming stars flailing in the shallows." Metacritic, which uses a weighted average, assigned the film a score of 37 out of 100, based on 47 critics, indicating "generally unfavorable" reviews. Audiences polled by CinemaScore gave the film an average grade of "B+" on an A+ to F scale, while PostTrak reported filmgoers gave it a 76% overall positive score. Dwayne Johnson responded to critics' reviews, saying that the film was made for fans and that they loved it.

Writing for Rolling Stone, Peter Travers praised the "easy rapport" of Johnson and Efron while saying, "what [the film] needs more is a functional script". Travers rated it two out of four stars and said, "Think of yourself sitting down for a big two-hour wallow in instant stupid with a vat of popcorn, slathered in fake butter and possibly a mound of melted M&Ms on top. It feels great chugging it down, then your stomach hurts, your head aches and you puke the whole thing up so you can forget about it in the morning. That's Baywatch in a nutshell." Owen Gleiberman of Variety called it "stupidly entertaining... for a while" but was critical of the plot. Brian Truitt of USA Today gave the film two out of four stars, and said that while the film had all the elements you would expect "the remake yearns to be both sendup farce and straight action film, tripping along the way and failing to grasp either." Richard Roeper of the Chicago Sun-Times gave the film 1.5 out of 4 stars, writing: "As was the case with CHiPs, The Dukes of Hazzard, The Beverly Hillbillies, Car 54, Where Are You? and I'll just stop there, when you make films from junk TV, more often than not you're going to wind up with a junk movie."

== Accolades ==
Year	Award	Category	Recipient(s)	Result	Ref.
2017	Teen Choice Awards	Choice Movie: Comedy Actor	Dwayne Johnson	Nominated	
2017	Teen Choice Awards	Choice Movie: Comedy Actor	Zac Efron	Won	
2017	Teen Choice Awards	Choice Movie: Comedy Actress	Alexandra Daddario	Nominated	
2017	Teen Choice Awards	Choice Movie: Villain	Priyanka Chopra	Nominated	
2017	Teen Choice Awards	Choice Movie: Ship	Dwayne Johnson and Zac Efron	Nominated	
2017	Golden Schmoes Awards	Best T&A of the Year	Alexandra Daddario	Won	
2018	38th Golden Raspberry Awards	Worst Picture	Michael Berk, Gregory J. Bonann, Beau Flynn, Ivan Reitman, Douglas Schwartz	Nominated	
2018	38th Golden Raspberry Awards	Worst Screenplay	Damian Shannon, Mark Swift, Jay Scherick, David Ronn, Thomas Lennon and Robert Ben Garant	Nominated	
2018	38th Golden Raspberry Awards	Worst Actor	Zac Efron	Nominated	
2018	38th Golden Raspberry Awards	Worst Prequel, Remake, Rip-off or Sequel		Nominated	
2018	38th Golden Raspberry Awards	The Razzie Nominee So Rotten You Loved It		Won	

== Future ==
In May 2017, producer Beau Flynn revealed plans for a sequel were in development, with the project's story already written. Damian Shannon and Mark Swift were stated to be returning to their roles as co-screenwriters, while the plot would revolve around the titular team's adventures in traveling to a different environment overseas. Dwayne Johnson and Zac Efron entered early negotiations to reprise their roles, while the remaining cast were expected to also return in the potential sequel.
