= Leigh Dyer =

English sculptor

Leigh Dyer is a sculptor specialising in stainless steel metal.

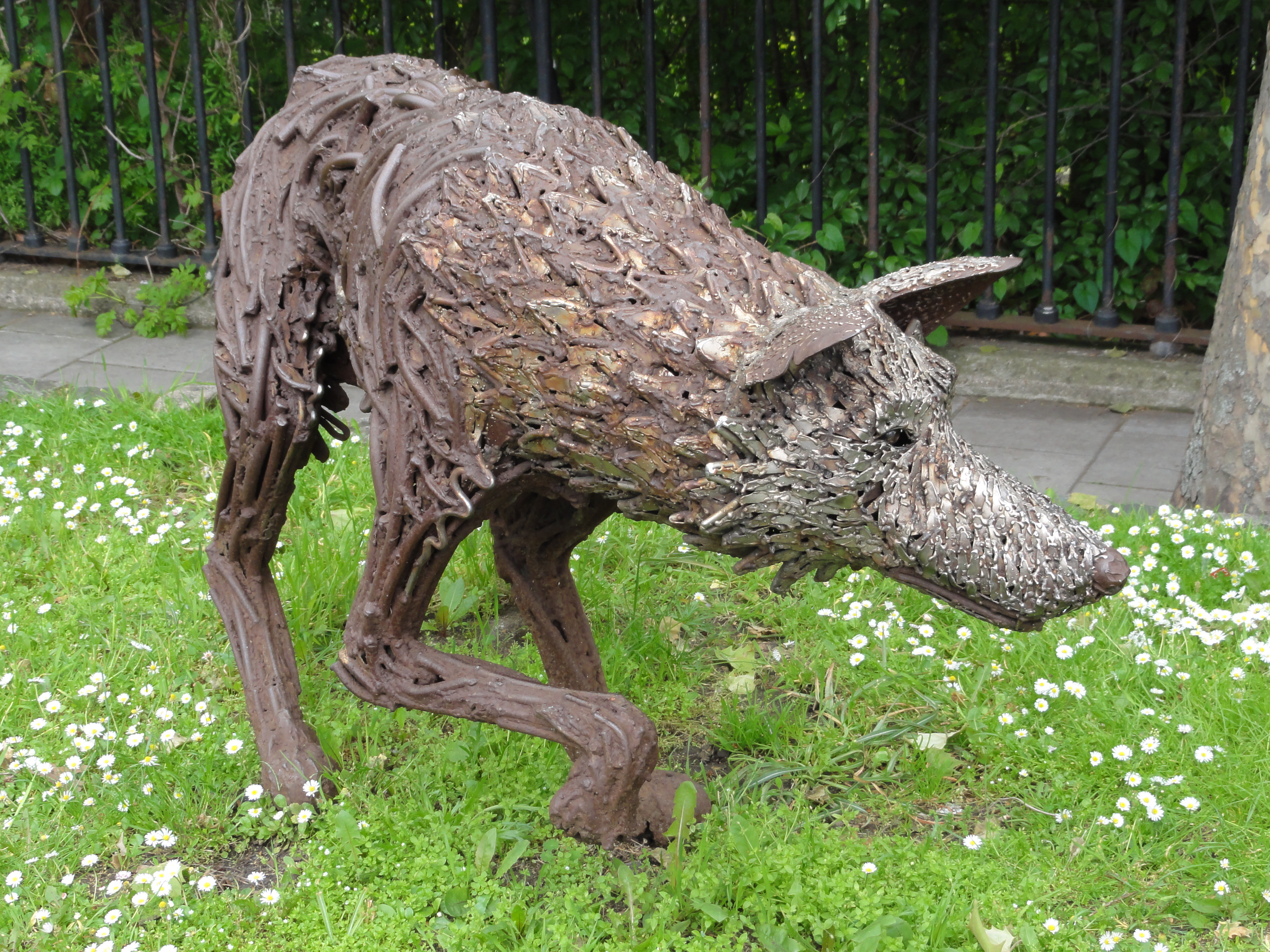
Wolf figure as part of "Run" permanent public installation at Denmark Hill, London

His public commissions include:

- Lake sculpture near Hastings Museum and Art Gallery
- Peace Gardens in Alexandra Park, Hastings
- Clover Tree in the Old Town, Hastings
- "Run" sculptures at Denmark Hill, London
- A giant winkle at Winkle Island, Hastings
