= Tom McTigue =

American actor and comedian (born 1959)

- Born: Thomas McTigue; 1959 (age 66–67)
- Education: Washington State University
- Occupations: Actor and Comedian
- Years active: 1989–present

Thomas McTigue (born 1959) is an American actor and comedian. He is best known for playing Harvey Miller on the 1990s television series Baywatch 2nd season. He made guest appearances on numerous television programs: Beverly Hills, 90210 in 1991 as Jack and on Roseanne in 1994 as a doctor. He has also appeared in several films and hundreds of commercials. He has a minor part as a teacher in the 2014 film Boyhood.

== Biography ==
Tom McTigue was born and grew up in Spokane, Washington. He studied theatre at Washington State University. After moving to New York to study acting, he returned to Seattle where he acted in regional plays. He eventually became interested in stand up comedy and began performing on the road.

== Filmography ==
Year	Title	Role	Notes
1989	Jake and the Fatman	Jeff	TV series
1990	Quantum Leap	Calloway	TV series
1991	Beverly Hills, 90210	Jack	TV series
1991-1992	Baywatch	Harvey Miller	TV series
1995	Lover's Knot	Doug Meyers	Movie
2002	ER		TV series
2011	The Descendants	Cousin Dave	Movie
