= Mitch Buchannon =

Fictional character in the television series Baywatch

- Baywatch character
- First appearance: Panic at Malibu Pier (1989)
- Portrayed by: David Hasselhoff (Television series); Dwayne Johnson (film)

In-universe information
- Nickname: Mitch
- Gender: Male
- Occupation: Lieutenant/Captain/Lifeguard (1974–2000); Private Investigator (1995–1997)
- Family: Al Buchannon (father); Irene Buchannon (mother); Buzz Buchannon (brother)
- Spouses: Gayle (divorced); Neely Capshaw (divorced)
- Children: Hobie Buchannon; Tanner Sloan (adopted)
- Relatives: Alex Buchannon (uncle); Kyle Buchannon (nephew)
- Nationality: American

Mitch Buchannon is a fictional character from the television series Baywatch. He was played by David Hasselhoff in every season of Baywatch and Baywatch Nights plus in the first season of Baywatch Hawaii. He also appeared in three films, Baywatch the Movie: Forbidden Paradise (1995), Baywatch: White Thunder at Glacier Bay (1998) and Baywatch: Hawaiian Wedding (2003). Later, Dwayne Johnson portrayed a lifeguard also named Mitch Buchannon who is a protege of the original Mitch Buchannon in the 2017 film Baywatch.

Mitch was the main character from the series premiere of Baywatch in 1989 to the penultimate season of Baywatch: Hawaii in 2000, when Hasselhoff decided to leave the series as an actor, while remaining as executive producer. As the years progressed, Mitch increasingly served as a mentor and father figure to many of the younger lifeguards at Baywatch headquarters, helping them in work-related matters, and also issues in their personal lives.

== Television ==
=== Fictional character biography ===
Mitch was the youngest son of Al and Irene Buchannon. He was born c. 1954, though his age varies depending upon the episode. He had an older brother named Buzz and the two got along quite well despite their very different personalities. While Buzz was the carefree brother who did what he wanted, Mitch was much more responsible. Buzz left home at a very early age, leaving Mitch as the only child at home. When Mitch was 12, he received a Fender Mustang guitar that Buzz let him have. Years later, Mitch recalled the guitar fondly and dreamed of what his life would be like if he were a musician. The episode cleverly used footage of David Hasselhoff's musical career (though Hasselhoff himself never played any instruments) to show Mitch's daydreams of stardom. In one episode, Mitch was invited onstage to sing alongside Little Richard during a performance of "Good Golly, Miss Molly."

Another musical milestone for Mitch occurred in the early 1960s, at the age of 8, when he was chosen by the Beach Boys to sing back up on the song "Don't Worry Baby" for a Battle of the Bands contest, because his brother Buzz surfed with the famous band, and Mike Love liked the sound of Mitch's voice. In 1995, Mitch threw a charity concert with the Surf-Rider Foundation to build a pipeline to divert a storm drain that was polluting the coast. Using Buzzy's connections, he got the Beach Boys to perform at the concert, singing the song "Summer in Paradise." Mitch's claims of singing with the Beach Boys as a youngster may be dubious, as in the very same episode, Mike Love didn't seem to remember Mitch as well as he remembered Buzz.

In 1972, Mitch graduated from West Palisades High School, where he sang in a band. At his 20 year reunion, he was pressured into singing on stage. After graduating, Mitch married his high school sweetheart, Gayle (played by Wendie Malick), and they had a son, Hobie, whom Mitch named after the surfboard company of the same name. While Mitch and Gayle loved each other, they eventually divorced. Gayle felt Mitch was too invested in his work, and she couldn't handle all the time he had invested into his career. Mitch did not want to divorce, and he continued to love Gayle for a time, even after the marriage had ended.

Mitch reunited with his brother Buzz in 1991, also meeting Buzz's son, Kyle. Buzz and Kyle stayed very briefly before relocating to San Diego, while Mitch continued to raise Hobie in Venice. Mitch and Buzz reunited once more in 1994, when Mitch saved Buzz's life at sea after Buzz suffered a heart attack.

Mitch did not always have a good relationship with his father. He felt Al did not love him and was disappointed in him. This was due to Al's wish that Mitch would follow in his footsteps and become an architect. For a while Mitch went along with his father's requests and even earned an architectural degree, working for two months alongside his father in the firm. However, Mitch decided it wasn't for him and he decided to become a full-time lifeguard instead, something he had dreamed of doing since he was a young boy. After Al's death, Mitch and Hobie made an annual trip to his grave each Memorial Day. In one episode of Baywatch nights, David Hasselhoff plays the role of Al in a flashback sequence to Mitch's childhood.

Mitch's mother Irene was diagnosed with Alzheimer's disease in a very special 1995 episode.

One of Mitch's favorite bands growing up was The Heat Rays, a fictionalized amalgamation of The Beach Boys and other surf rock bands. In 1996, when two members of the band were murdered, Mitch solved the crime, though implicating two members of the band in a crime of their own.

Mitch was also a Navy SEAL who taught hand-to-hand combat while in the service. This was also referenced briefly in the season three two-part episode "Shattered." As a SEAL, Mitch went on at least two operations, one of which he could not talk about. He also had a commanding officer named "Junkyard" who said that Mitch "was never good at taking orders and never knew when to quit." The operations hinted at in Baywatch Hawaii do not match the timeline of the original Baywatch, thus creating a continuity error in the writing. Mitch was shown to have a care-free, cavalier attitude towards his work as a SEAL, starkly contrasting the character's attitude towards the work and profession of a lifeguard.

Around 1983, Mitch spent a year in Australia as part of the lifeguard exchange program. One day he attempted to rescue a wind surfer in treacherous waves, but failed to save her. Ten years later, her husband, a man named Wily Brown, came to the United States to get revenge on the lifeguard who failed to save her. Mitch was involved in a series of accidents (such as failing brakes on his rescue truck and a poisonous snake left in his locker), and was suspicious that Wily perpetrated them. Finally the truth was revealed when Mitch's friend Kaye, a newspaper reporter, found Wily's personnel file. As Mitch went to confront Wily about his suspicions, he was sneak attacked and left for dead in a burning lifeguard tower. Fortunately, Mitch woke up and got out in time to chase Wily in the scarab, lassoing him and sending him off to the proper authorities.

In 1986, Mitch uncovered a drug operation on the marina. His work led to the arrest and conviction of drug lord Mason Sato, who was released from prison five years later, in the 1991 episode "War of Nerves." Sato began stalking Mitch, Hobie, and Mitch's friend Kaye. Eventually Mitch and Sato fought on the docks, and Sato was arrested and returned to prison. Sato returned as the villainous mastermind in the 2003 reunion movie Baywatch: Hawaiian Wedding.

Shortly after his divorce from Gayle in 1989, Mitch entered into a relationship with visiting lifeguard Stephanie Holden. The two quickly became serious but the relationship ended abruptly when Stephanie left both Mitch and Baywatch. Three years later, when Stephanie returned to Baywatch full-time as a Lieutenant, Mitch discovered that she was still married when he was pursuing her, and that she broke off her relationship with Mitch in order to work things out with her husband. Though Stephanie was officially divorced by the time of her 1992 return, it was decided by both Mitch and Stephanie to maintain a platonic relationship from that point onward. However, due to inconsistent plotlines that would later appear, the nature of this relationship would occasionally go from platonic to flirtatious to unrequited on either side, depending upon how it fit the story of each episode. Additionally, the hierarchy of their roles as lifeguards remained inconsistent. In some episodes, Stephanie was of a higher rank than Mitch, and in others, Mitch was her direct supervisor. After Stephanie's death, her picture could often be seen on Mitch's mantle above his fireplace.

=== Baywatch: Hawaii ===
The 1999 premiere episode of Baywatch: Hawaii showed a new and somewhat darker side to Mitch Buchannon. Disillusioned by his failed relationships, his mother's losing battle with Alzheimer's disease, and the fact that his son Hobie had left home and gone off to college, Mitch decided to pack his bags and escape to Hawaii. The opening scenes of the first episode seemed to show Mitch as a bit of a reclusive loner, staying on a secluded beach and trying to escape his life as an L.A. County Lifeguard. However, when he saw a family of four drowning, he jumped in to save them, knowing he could save their lives, and that he could never escape his true calling. In spite of the fact that he pulled all four family members out of the water, Mitch still felt a step too slow, and confessed to his friend, local lifeguard Leon 'Rock' Keaweamahi (played by Vincent Klyn) that he wished to establish a training center where lifeguards from diverse geographic locations could meet and discuss life-saving techniques. Mitch then put together a group of 6 elite lifeguards from California, Australia, and the Hawaiian Islands, establishing them as his new team who worked at the training center.

It was hinted in the series that Mitch was still active in the Navy SEALS, and had been involved in various black ops through the years. The continuity of these operations conflict with storylines seen in Baywatch and Baywatch Nights.

At the end of the first season of Baywatch: Hawaii, David Hasselhoff chose to leave the role of Mitch. While on the trail of eco-terrorists led by Mitch's former SEAL comrade gone rogue, Zach Martin, Mitch was caught in an underwater explosion and presumed dead, though his body was never found. The series carried on for one more year without the character of Mitch, before ending in the spring of 2001.

=== Baywatch ===
Mitch was known throughout the series for taking his career as a lifeguard very seriously. Quite often, he would find himself on the defensive from criticisms by characters with misconceptions about his work, who would assume he was just on the beach to meet girls or to sun tan. A typical solution to this plot element would be for the criticizing person to end up in need of a rescue, or to witness Mitch saving a life, thus having their opinion of the lifeguard profession changed. On at least one occasion, Mitch described lifeguarding as "the only job [he] ever had." In regards to his vocation, Mitch has referred to himself as a "salt water junkie," and also admitted to living according to the credo, "Once a lifeguard, always a lifeguard." Mitch was occasionally forced to defend his fellow lifeguards from slurs such as "wave jockey."

When the series begins, Gayle and Mitch are having difficulties working out the custody agreement over Hobie. Gayle wants Hobie to come live with her full-time in Ohio. Mitch is devastated over this, but after realizing how much Hobie wants to stay with his father, Gayle agrees to let him stay in California. In the season 2 episode "Reunion," Gayle concedes that Mitch is doing an excellent job raising Hobie by himself.

Mitch was occasionally shown to have money problems. In the season 2 episode "Money, Honey," he took on a job as a private lifeguard at a gala event thrown at the home of a movie producer named Dita (played by Leslie Easterbrook). He did this to get money for hockey equipment for Hobie. After rescuing several boaters who had been drinking, Mitch was offered a role in a movie. Finding that working as an actor was more difficult than he realized, Mitch quit and gave his $20,000 earnings to a charity designed to protect injured sea animals. Another side job that Mitch took on was teaching a CPR class at Santa Monica College in the evenings.

One of the great longings of Mitch's life throughout the series was for a family beyond himself and Hobie. He wanted a woman to share his life with, and more children so Hobie would have brothers and sisters. By season 3 he admitted to his longtime friend, Police Officer Garner Ellerbee that he was tired of meeting women on the beach and being caught up in purely physical relationships. Many episodes featured Mitch suffering from a broken heart, usually due to betrayals, misunderstandings, or even the death of his love interest. Mitch briefly dated Jackie Quinn, mother of Summer, during season 4. She later described him as "The sweetest man I have ever met." Jackie differentiated herself from Mitch's other lady friends by asking him if he loved the ocean more than he loved Gayle. While among friends, Jackie also inferred the possibility that Mitch had used spontaneous rescue opportunities as a means of escaping intimacy. Mitch was also involved in an on-again, off-again relationship with Kaye, a newspaper reporter, who was played by David Hasselhoff's then wife, Pamela Bach.

Perhaps the greatest challenge of Mitch Buchannon's life came in the two-part episode, "Shattered," where Mitch was paralyzed after being slammed three times by a wave into some rocks. After being hospitalized for his injuries, Mitch befriended Jason, a boy from Chicago as part of the Witness Protection Program who used a wheelchair due to injuries sustained while protecting his brother from drug dealers. Mitch was despondent and full of grief over the prospect of never lifeguarding again, but when Jason's life was in danger from attackers, Mitch was able to move his leg again and kick a gun away from the attacker's reach. Mitch knew then that he was on the road to recovery, and was able to rehabilitate shortly thereafter. The injury was never referenced again throughout the run of Baywatch or its spinoffs.

As Lieutenant Lifeguard, Mitch wore a khaki uniform through the first season. From season 2 onward, Mitch's office uniform consisted of a white polo shirt with sweats and a red jacket. Mitch often carried a badge and acted in a quasi-law enforcement capacity, occasionally doing mundane tasks such as checking boardwalk merchants for permits. Mitch also worked alongside The FBI in one episode, helping them stake out the home of a local woman believed to be involved in crime. Mitch's relationship with the Bureau continued into the Baywatch Nights series.

Sometimes Mitch's work and his personal life would intersect, as he met several of the women in his life through his career. In one episode, Mitch met a mysterious woman named Kate McCoy, who helped him rescue a fishing trawler. Over the course of a day, Mitch and Kate developed a strong bond. After telling Mitch that she felt safe for the first time in her life, Kate died of a heart attack under mysterious circumstances outside of Mitch's tower. Mitch immediately perceived that foul play was involved, as young healthy women do not ordinarily suffer heart attacks. It was then revealed that Kate was murdered, as she was a reporter investigating a shady arms deal. This event served as an impetus for the lovelorn Mitch to continue branching out into his second career as a private investigator.

Mitch lived in a rather large house that was situated along a canal, but it was never explained how he maintained such a lavish home on a lifeguard's salary (it is presumed because he was a Lieutenant who worked full-time all year long, that he made a decent living. It is also presumed he received a substantial raise when promoted to Captain in the eighth season). In first season episodes, Mitch's living room couch was made from an old rowboat, but when the series was revived for its second season in 1991, more contemporary furniture was used. The layout of the kitchen and front entrance were also different. Many scenes featured a roaring fireplace in his living room, where he would often play checkers or chess with Hobie or Garner, or be shown sipping wine with his love interests. He also quite often invited his fellow lifeguards over for meals like pizza or smoked fish. In earlier episodes, many of the lifeguards were in his house to babysit Hobie when Mitch was called away to help with lifeguard or police business. According to one episode, the house was located on 1311 Talanca, in Venice, CA 90294, though no such address truly exists.

Mitch was involved in many sports through the run of the series. Among them were kickboxing and the racing of boats and dune buggies. Mitch also participated in an Ironman Competition around the time of his 40th birthday. Additionally, Mitch teamed with fellow lifeguard Newman to win a team rowing competition for seven years in a row. In 1997, Mitch initially decided to step aside from the competition so Hobie could enter, but Hobie asked him to continue, just so the two could compete. After an arduous race, Hobie edged out the victory, ending Mitch's streak. In season 9, Mitch participated in a stock car race where he came in second place, behind Mark Martin. In the season 3 episode, "Princess of Tides," Mitch won the 1992 Randenberg Cup, a fictional powerboat racing championship.

When Mitch was eight years old, he saw the film The Maltese Falcon and was inspired to one day become a private detective. However, lifeguarding was still his first love. The dream of being a detective came true in 1995 when Mitch started a detective agency with Garner. The agency became the focal point of the spinoff series Baywatch Nights. The character of Mitch appeared concurrently on both series, working as a lifeguard by day and detective by night. However, shortly after starting the detective agency, it began to interfere with his lifeguard schedule at Baywatch. Initially, he stepped back to recurrent status, but after speaking to Stephanie (who was in charge of scheduling at Baywatch Headquarters) about it, she began giving him his weekly hours back.

When Mitch allowed Lifeguard Neely Capshaw and her daughter Ashley to stay in his home, it brought back memories of raising Hobie. When Hobie moved out in season 9, it made Mitch somewhat depressed. However, Mitch became a father once again that season when he adopted Tanner Sloan, a runaway with derelict parents, from the junior lifeguard program. Once more raising a child, Mitch felt reinvigorated to be a father again.

=== Baywatch Nights ===
While the character of Mitch remained essentially the same in the 1995 premiere of Baywatch Nights, he often narrated the events of each episode in a film noir style, something that was previously never done on the original series (though Mitch began narrating episodes of the original series in season 9). Mitch also broke the fourth wall in the pilot episode by addressing the home viewers in the opening scene. Through the first season, extra emphasis was given on the friendship between Mitch and Garner. In a 1995 interview with Conan O'Brien, David Hasselhoff (who was also co-creator of Baywatch Nights) stated that he was trying to do "A Lethal Weapon type thing." The series also introduced Angie Harmon as Ryan McBride, a Texas-born detective who had relocated to New York City and then California. There were often hints of attraction between the characters of Mitch and Ryan. However, like the original Baywatch series, there are many inconsistencies with the character of Mitch Buchannon. The genesis of Mitch's private eye experience is not shown until the 8th episode, where Mitch reluctantly became a private eye, a stark contrast to the childhood dreams of detective work depicted during the original series.

There are many differences between being a lifeguard and being a PI. Lifeguards run on sand. PIs run on everything. I realized that as I chased after a boardwalk con man we've been staking out all day. You know, John Lennon once said ... that life is what happens when you're busy making plans. I didn't plan on meeting a beautiful woman during a fistfight.

— Mitch Buchannon, "Kind of a Drag", Baywatch Nights, Season 1, Episode 10

The difference between being a lifeguard and a private eye is that a lifeguard has to spot trouble and respond. Private eye gets hired by someone who's already in trouble. Either way, a stranger's life is suddenly in your hands. Unfortunately, private eyes can't always spot the victims as easily as lifeguards.

— Mitch Buchannon, "Blues Boy," Baywatch Nights, Season 1, Episode 9

After the first season of Nights was shown to have poor ratings, it was retooled for season two as a science-fiction inspired show, similar to The X-Files. Gregory-Alan Williams and the character of Garner Ellerbee left the series, replaced by the character of Daimont Teague (played by Dorian Gregory), a mysterious paranormal expert.

Mitch's detective career seemed to take a supernatural turn in 1996. One day, while on duty as a lifeguard, Mitch pulled a woman out of the water in what at first appeared to be a routine save. Speaking in Malay, she spoke of a creature that every culture has had in its mythology: "a legendary creature that is the embodiment of all evil," according to Mitch's associate, paranormal expert Daimont Teague. Believing the woman to have survived a recent shipwreck known as the "Argo Zed," Mitch chartered a boat and dove to the location of the shipwreck. Mitch and his fellow diver, Griff, found a body near the shipwreck and decided to go further into the massive ship. In the ship's boiler room they found an air pocket but were attacked by what Teague believed to be "The Ajogun," a mythical creature believed to inhabit the Purari River. After fighting and defeating the creature (which Mitch and Griff could not identify), they continued through the ship, finding another air pocket that contained sleeping children, who had miraculously survived the shipwreck. Escaping through the bilge, the children were safely brought to the surface. Even after this encounter, Mitch told Teague that he still didn't believe in the paranormal, but could not deny that something unusual was there.

The storylines of Baywatch Nights grew increasingly more bizarre as the series progressed in season 2. Mitch faced many strange and terrifying things that season. Among them were things such as voodoo cults, ancient Vikings, vampires, extra-terrestrials, and human-fish hybrids. The series gained a small cult following because of its similarities to many infamous B-Movies, but ratings were not high enough to justify the continuation of the series. The same season, the original Baywatch (then in its seventh season) referenced the same events from Nights in a tongue-in-cheek manner, with one episode showing Mitch stumbling through Baywatch headquarters, wearing bandages around his neck, implying that he was attacked by a vampire the night before. Throughout the second and final season, Mitch often served as a doubtful skeptic to his friends during their adventures, refusing to believe the fantastical events that had occurred, often rationalizing them in spite of the evidence to the contrary.

In perhaps the most bizarre episode of the series, Mitch encountered two Vikings (involved in a blood feud with each other), from the year 790 AD, who had been thawed out after centuries in a deep freeze. The episode showed that Mitch had an encyclopedic knowledge of Vikings, because he studied sea-faring people growing up. He even told his friend Griff that if he had lived in those days, he would have been a Viking. After the two warriors fought to the death, Mitch gave them the closest thing he could to a proper Viking funeral, by sending them off the harbor in a wooden raft, and then shooting a flaming arrow at the raft, sinking it, giving them a funeral at sea. The episode also marked the final television appearance of Hasselhoff's former Knight Rider co-star Edward Mulhare, who passed of lung cancer shortly after the episode aired.

After the cancellation of Baywatch Nights, Mitch continued on the original series, now promoted to Captain. Nights was once more alluded to in a tongue-in-cheek manner in the Season 8 episode, "Eel Nino," where an electric eel had been terrorizing beachgoers. When some of the lifeguards (not yet knowing it was an electric eel), speculated that it could be an alien, Mitch, annoyed, told them, "This is not the X-Files." The series then returned to a reasonably more realistic format from that point on.

Mitch and Garner teamed up again on the original Baywatch series in season 8, where they reached a temporary impasse due to Garner using Mitch's new love interest, Neely Capshaw, as an undercover mole in a drug dealer's operation. By the end of the episode, Mitch and Garner had achieved rapprochement, but it would ultimately be the last time the duo appeared together in the series.

== Television film ==
=== Baywatch: Hawaiian Wedding ===
Mitch returned in the 2003 TV movie Baywatch: Hawaiian Wedding. Serving as both a reunion episode and bookend to the Baywatch saga, Mitch, alive and well after being presumed dead in 2000, was ready to marry a woman who resembled his late friend and lover, Stephanie Holden, before being forced to face his old enemy, Mason Sato, originally seen in Season 2.

== Film ==
Mitch Buchannon was played by Dwayne Johnson in the 2017 film adaptation, with Hasselhoff making a cameo as the original Mitch Buchannon.
