= Baywatch =

American drama television series (1989–2001)

- Also known as: Baywatch: Hawaii
- Genre: Drama
- Created by: Michael Berk; Douglas Schwartz; Gregory J. Bonann
- Starring: Ensemble cast
- Theme music composer: John D'Andrea; Cory Lerios
- Opening theme: "Save Me" by Peter Cetera (season 1); "I'm Always Here" by Jimi Jamison (seasons 2–10); "Let Me Be the One" by Fiji (season 11)
- Ending theme: "Current of Love" by David Hasselhoff (seasons 2–4); "I Believe" by David Hasselhoff and Laura Branigan (season 5); "I'm Always Here" Instrumental version (seasons 6–10)
- Composers: John D'Andrea; Cory Lerios
- Country of origin: United States
- Original language: English
- No. of seasons: 11
- No. of episodes: 241 (list of episodes)

Production
- Executive producers: Michael Berk; Douglas Schwartz; Gregory J. Bonann; David Hasselhoff
- Production locations: Will Rogers State Beach; Long Beach, California; Malibu, California; Honolulu County, Hawaii
- Running time: 37–47 minutes
- Production companies: GTG Entertainment; All American Television; Tower 12 Productions; Pearson Television

Original release
- Network: NBC
- Release: September 22, 1989 – April 6, 1990
- Network: Syndication
- Release: September 23, 1991 – May 14, 2001

Related
- Baywatch Nights

Baywatch is an American drama television series about lifeguards who patrol the beaches of Los Angeles County, California, and Hawaii, starring David Hasselhoff. It was created by Michael Berk, Douglas Schwartz, and Gregory J. Bonann, who produced the show throughout its 11-season run. The series focuses on both professional and personal challenges faced by the characters, portrayed by a large rotating ensemble cast that includes Pamela Anderson, Alexandra Paul, Gregory Alan Williams, Jeremy Jackson, Parker Stevenson, David Chokachi, Billy Warlock, Erika Eleniak, David Charvet, Yasmine Bleeth, and Nicole Eggert.

The show was canceled after its first season on NBC, but survived through syndication and later became the most-watched television series in the world, with a weekly audience of over 1.1 billion viewers despite consistently negative critical reviews, earning it a reputation as a pop cultural phenomenon and frequent source of allusion and parody. The show ran in its original title and format from 1989 to 1999. From 1999 to 2001, with a setting change and large cast overhaul, it was known as Baywatch: Hawaii.

It spawned a spin-off series, Baywatch Nights, which aired for two seasons from 1995 to 1997, a 2003 one-off feature length revival episode, Baywatch: Hawaiian Wedding and a 2017 feature film adaptation.

== Overview ==
Baywatch revolves around the work of a team of lifeguards and their interpersonal relationships, with plots usually centering on dangers related to the beach and other activities pertinent to the California (later Hawaii) beach lifestyle. Saving people from drowning is one of the most typical situations used in the show, but a range of other topics, such as earthquakes, shark attacks and serial killers, serve as plot conflicts on the show.

== Episodes ==
Season	Episodes	Originally released		
Season	Episodes	First released	Last released	Network
Pilot		April 23, 1989		NBC
1	21	September 22, 1989	April 6, 1990	NBC
2	22	September 23, 1991	May 18, 1992	Syndication
3	22	September 14, 1992	May 10, 1993	Syndication
4	22	September 20, 1993	May 16, 1994	Syndication
5	22	September 26, 1994	May 22, 1995	Syndication
6	22	September 25, 1995	May 13, 1996	Syndication
7	22	September 23, 1996	May 12, 1997	Syndication
8	22	September 22, 1997	May 18, 1998	Syndication
9	22	September 21, 1998	May 17, 1999	Syndication
10	22	September 20, 1999	May 15, 2000	Syndication
11	22	October 2, 2000	May 14, 2001	Syndication
Reunion		February 28, 2003		Fox

== Cast ==
Baywatch is noted for its large ensemble cast with various members "rotating" in-and-out of the show, similarly to many long-running soap operas. By the end of the 11-season run, not a single member of the original cast was still in the cast. David Hasselhoff appeared in the most episodes (totaling 206 including the pilot), followed by Jeremy Jackson (117), Michael Newman (109), and Pamela Anderson (77).

Following the Hawaii retool, many of the series' longtime cast members left the show. The only remaining cast members were David Hasselhoff, Brooke Burns, Michael Bergin, and Michael Newman. Following the 10th season, Hasselhoff and Newman both left the series, leaving Bergin and Burns the only remnants of the show's original "L.A. era".

=== Baywatch (1989–1999) ===
- David Hasselhoff as Mitch Buchannon
- Parker Stevenson as Craig Pomeroy
- Shawn Weatherly as Jill Riley
- Billy Warlock as Eddie Kramer
- Erika Eleniak as Shauni McClain
- Peter Phelps as Trevor Cole
- Brandon Call as Hobie Buchannon (Season 1)
- Jeremy Jackson as Hobie Buchannon
- Gina Hecht as Gina Pomeroy (Pilot)
- Holly Gagnier as Gina Pomeroy
- Monte Markham as Don Thorpe
- John Allen Nelson as John D. Cort
- Gregory Alan Williams as Garner Ellerbee
- Tom McTigue as Harvey Miller
- Richard Jaeckel as Ben Edwards
- Nicole Eggert as Summer Quinn
- David Charvet as Matt Brody
- Pamela Anderson as C. J. Parker
- Kelly Slater as Jimmy Slade
- Alexandra Paul as Stephanie Holden
- Yasmine Bleeth as Caroline Holden
- Jaason Simmons as Logan Fowler
- David Chokachi as Cody Madison
- Gena Lee Nolin as Neely Capshaw
- Donna D'Errico as Donna Marco
- José Solano as Manny Gutierrez
- Traci Bingham as Jordan Tate
- Nancy Valen as Samantha Thomas
- Michael Newman as Newmie
- Carmen Electra as Lani McKenzie
- Kelly Packard as April Giminski
- Michael Bergin as J. D. Darius
- Angelica Bridges as Taylor Walsh
- Marliece Andrada as Skylar Bergman
- Mitzi Kapture as Alex Ryker
- Brooke Burns as Jessie Owens

=== Baywatch Hawaii (1999–2001) ===
- David Hasselhoff as Mitch Buchannon
- Brooke Burns as Jessie Owens
- Michael Bergin as J. D. Darius
- Brandy Ledford as Dawn Masterton
- Michael Newman as Newmie
- Simmone Mackinnon as Allie Reese
- Jason Momoa as Jason Ioane
- Stacy Kamano as Kekoa Tanaka
- Jason Brooks as Sean Monroe
- Brande Roderick as Leigh Dyer
- Charlie Brumbly as Zach McEwan
- Krista Allen as Jenna Avid

== History ==
=== Development and production ===
The idea of Baywatch came about when Gregory J. Bonann, the creator of the show, was on duty as a lifeguard and saved two children of an MTM studio employee named Stu Erwin. Bonann originally called the show Aquatic Corps for Emergency Service (ACES), but later changed it to Baywatch, the name of rescue boats that patrolled Santa Monica Bay. The Baywatch logo was created by Bonann's lifeguard friend John Johnson.

Baywatch debuted on NBC in 1989, but was canceled after only one season, when it placed 73rd out of 103 shows in the seasonal ratings, and also because the production studio, GTG (a joint venture of television station owner Gannett Company and Grant Tinker) went out of business. Due to high production costs, GTG was unable to finance the series any further.

Feeling the series still had potential, David Hasselhoff, one of the principal actors, along with creators and executive producers Michael Berk, Douglas Schwartz, and Bonann, revived it for the first-run syndication market in 1991. Hasselhoff was given the title of executive producer for his work on bringing the show back. The series was hugely successful, especially internationally. In the United Kingdom for the week ending February 28, 1990 the series reached an audience of 12.85 million, and it had been sold to Canada, Germany, the Netherlands, Finland, Hong Kong, Greece, Turkey, Singapore, Australia, New Zealand, Argentina, Mexico, Bolivia, Peru, Chile, Panama, Guatemala and the Philippines.

The popularity of Baywatch led to a spin-off, Baywatch Nights, and three direct-to-video films: Baywatch the Movie: Forbidden Paradise, Baywatch: White Thunder at Glacier Bay, and Baywatch: Hawaiian Wedding.

The audience was 65 percent female, with its number one audience being women aged 18 to 34. Speaking in 2001, Schwartz explained that, after doing focus groups on Baywatch for about five years, they learned that the show appealed to this demographic because "most of [its] lead characters were strong, independent women who were heroic, who were saving lives, who were equal to men".

In 2018, FremantleMedia International, working with Warner Bros. and Illuminate, remastered Baywatch from its original 35 mm film to high-definition, and redistributed the series to broadcasters.

=== Filming ===
Will Rogers State Beach served as the predominant beach location for Baywatch, although some scenes were filmed at Long Beach, California, and in Malibu, California.

=== Theme song ===
The original NBC theme was "Save Me", performed by Peter Cetera, with Bonnie Raitt on guitar and Richard Sterban, the bass singer for The Oak Ridge Boys, as one of the background vocalists. From the second season onwards after syndication the theme "I'm Always Here" by Jimi Jamison was used to save costs on royalties and is the most popular theme for the series. David Hasselhoff also recorded a duet with Laura Branigan which was hugely successful for being broadcast as the closing track of the Baywatch TV series. The single I Believe was originally released on CD album in 1994.

=== Baywatch: Hawaii ===
Baywatch Hawaii logo

In 1999, with production costs rising in Los Angeles, and the syndication market shrinking, the producers sought to move the production elsewhere. They filmed a pilot and announced plans to title the show Baywatch: Down Under. However, strong local opposition from residents of Avalon Beach, New South Wales eventually led to Pittwater Council, the local government area of which Avalon was part of, to permanently ban future production. As an alternative to Australia, Hawaii offered the producers large financial incentives to move the show to the islands, instead, and in season 10, Baywatch: Hawaii was launched.

Baywatch filmed for two seasons in Hawaii, from 1999 until 2001. April Masini, an entertainment industry executive, pitched the move to executive producer Gregory J. Bonann. The agreement mandated the addition of the subtitle, changing the title to Baywatch: Hawaii, as well as the hiring of local production crew, filming on-location for at least two years, and producing 44 episodes, each at a cost of about US$870,000 (climbing up to $1.1 million), 60% of which was to be spent in Hawaii. The series was canceled due to poor ratings.

== Home media ==
Baywatch "Nightmare Bay"/"River of No Return" DVD

- Australia: On May 1, 2013, Shock Entertainment released seasons 1–9 on DVD. They also released a complete series set on November 6, 2013, which features all nine seasons of Baywatch, both seasons of Baywatch Hawaii and both seasons of Baywatch Nights.
- France: The reunion film Baywatch: Hawaiian Wedding was translated to French language as Alerte à Malibu: Mariage à Hawaï and has been released.
- Finland: Seasons 1–3 have been released by Future Film.
- Germany: Seasons 1–11 have been released. These releases are presented exactly as they originally aired, albeit with German language credits (these are also available in the U.K. from Amazon as imports). The reunion film Baywatch: Hawaiian Wedding was translated to German language as Baywatch: Hochzeit auf Hawaii and has been released.
- Italy: Seasons 1–2 have been released by Koch Media, season 5–6 have been released by Sony Pictures Home Entertainment.
- Netherlands: Season 3 has been released.
- Sweden: Seasons 1–3 have been released.
- United Kingdom: Seasons 1–6 have been released by Network. In 2017, to coincide with the release of the feature film adaptation, Network released a DVD entitled Best of Baywatch which includes the two-part episodes "Nightmare Bay" and "River of No Return".
- United States: In June 1999, a single disc DVD was released featuring two 2-part episodes from the show's original run ("Nightmare Bay" parts 1 and 2 from season 2, and "River of No Return" parts 1 and 2 from season 3). These episodes are absent from the American box sets of their respective seasons mentioned below.

First Look Studios released the first three seasons on DVD in 2006/2007. Although the box sets are labeled "Season 1", "Season 2", etc., the sets actually feature episodes of the following season (i.e., the "Season 1" box set contains the episodes of the literal second season (1991–1992) of the show). The second and third sets were released on October 31, 2006. Each set features a disc with season 1 (NBC) episodes on it. These releases also do not contain any of the original music as it appeared when the episodes aired. They have been removed, including the opening title themes, due to copyright agreements. However, these releases have been discontinued and are now out of print.

In August 2018, Deadline Hollywood reported that Fremantle was "remastering" the series in high definition. However, Baywatch had been edited on tape, not film. This meant that the existing cuts of the episodes were impossible to release in high definition, and the "remasters" are in fact re-creations, and not always shot-for-shot accurate. The "remastered" episodes also changed the aspect ratio to 16:9 widescreen, resulting in some shots having a wider field of view but other shots having a narrower one. The "remastered" series was released on Amazon Prime Video and Hulu in HD and Pluto TV in 2019. Due to expired licenses for much of the show's musical soundtrack, many of the show's episodes are either cut to remove songs, or re-scored and re-edited with new "soundalike" tracks that were selected under the advice of the show's original co-composer Cory Lerios. The popular "I'm Always Here" theme song is kept in the "remastered" series, re-edited into the season 1 episodes. Visual Entertainment Incorporated released seasons 1–9 on DVD for the first time in the United States on May 3, 2021, with a Blu-ray release on May 21.

== In popular culture ==
Babewatch is a satirical term sometimes used in connection with the series, which has been used by the humor magazine Mad and by television commentators.

The red swimsuits that the actresses wore in the TV series Baywatch have become iconic, such that the New York Times suggested "Athletic. Flattering. Red. Who needs a string bikini?" The creators of the show modeled the swimsuits after the ones worn by Southern California female lifeguards with an original intent of functionality over sexy looks. The swimsuits were custom-fitted for each actress; Alexandra Paul wore a suit with a higher neckline while shorter cast members wore suits with higher-cut legs to give the illusion of height.

=== Baywatch running ===
"Baywatch running" refers to the show's numerous scenes, particularly in the opening credits, of its cast running across the beach in slow motion, usually wearing distinctive red lifeguard gear. The trope is closely associated with the show and often referenced directly in parodies.

== Related media ==
=== Film adaptation ===
A Baywatch movie was first announced in 2004, although the movie became stuck in development hell over the years, with several writers penning drafts. A movie was eventually released by Paramount Pictures in 2017 starring Dwayne Johnson and Zac Efron. The story follows lifeguard Mitch Buchannon and his team who must take down a drug lord in an effort to save their beach. It was a commercial success, grossing $177.9 million worldwide on a $65–69 million budget, but received negative reviews from critics. Baywatch received five nominations at the 38th Golden Raspberry Awards, including Worst Picture and Worst Actor for Efron.

=== Revival series ===
In August 2018, Deadline Hollywood reported that FremantleMedia International were eyeing a reboot of the franchise. On April 14, 2023, Fremantle began developing a reboot of the series and held early talks with several streamers and broadcasters. On March 4, 2024, it was announced that Fremantle and Fox Entertainment would team up for the reboot series for Fox, with Lara Olsen as writer and showrunner.

In September 2025, Fox officially gave the reboot a series order for 12 episodes, with the show expected to join the 2026–27 television season. The reboot used a $21.1 million/40% tax credit which was awarded by the State of California's expanded Film & Television Tax Credit Program. On February 13, 2026, it was announced that Stephen Amell was cast as an adult Hobie Buchannon, who (since the original series' ending) has followed in his father's footsteps as the captain of Baywatch. That same day, David Chokachi was confirmed to appear as well, reprising his role as Cody Madison from seasons 6 through 9. In the following March, Jessica Belkin, Thaddeus LaGrone, Hassie Harrison, Brooks Nader, Noah Beck, and Shay Mitchell rounded out the principal cast, while athletic influencer Livvy Dunne was cast in a recurring role as a junior lifeguard and actor Luke Eisner was cast in a recurring role. On April 15, 2026, it was announced that Erika Eleniak will reprise her role as Shauni McClain.

On May 29, 2026, it was announced that Mary McDonnell, Michael Bergin, and Kelly Packard had joined the cast in the recurring roles as Gayle Buchannon, J.D. Darius, and April Giminski. Two months later, it was revealed Blair Redford had been cast in the role of Hunter.

In October 2026, it was announced that the series would premiere on January 6, 2027.

=== After Baywatch: Moment in the Sun ===
In 2019, it was announced that Baywatch was being revived as a documentary feature film. As they explained on the Factual America podcast, filmmaker Matthew Felker lined up some of the show's top-billed cast members to take a walk down memory lane for Baywatch: The Documentary and talk about their time on the show and the hours they spent in skimpy red suits. The documentary, now titled After Baywatch: Moment in the Sun, aired as an ABC News Studios program on Hulu on August 28, 2024.

== See also ==
- Son of the Beach (Baywatch parody)
- Beach Heat: Miami
- Lifeguard, 1976 lifeguard film starring original Baywatch star Parker Stevenson
- Malibu Rescue (Family-friendly Baywatch parody)
- Pacific Blue – Series often described as "Baywatch on bikes." Carmen Electra guest-starred as her character Lani McKenzie in the episode "Heartbeat"
- Thunder in Paradise – Series from the creators of Baywatch
- Sheena – Series from the co-creator of Baywatch and stars Gena Lee Nolin and John Allen Nelson
- SAF3 – Series from the creators of Baywatch
