= José Solano (actor) =

American actor (born 1971)

- Born: José R. Solano; February 22, 1971 (age 55); Inglewood, California, U.S.
- Occupation: Actor

José Solano (born February 22, 1971) is an American actor.

Solano is best known for his role as Manny Gutierrez on Baywatch, and being the first Hispanic series regular on that show. He was named one of the "50 Most Beautiful People in the World" by YM magazine after winning their "Man of the Year" contest. Nominated for an "Outstanding Individual Performance in a Nationally Syndicated Drama Series" ALMA Award, he later received the Nosotros Margo Albert Golden Eagle Award for Most Promising Actor of 1997, presented to him by Ricardo Montalbán.

He served in the United States Navy during the early 90’s as a Deck Seaman onboard the USS Peleliu stationed at Naval Base San Diego.
