= C. J. Parker =

Fictional character from Baywatch played by Pamela Anderson

Casey Jean "C.J." Parker
- Baywatch character
- First appearance: "The River of No Return, Part I" (1992)
- Last appearance: Baywatch (2017)
- Portrayed by: Pamela Anderson (Television series); Kelly Rohrbach (film)

In-universe information
- Nickname: C.J.
- Gender: Female
- Occupation: Lifeguard; Riverraft Guide; Volleyball Coach; Beach Cafe owner
- Family: Mr. Parker (Father); Shelley Sands (Mother); Unnamed Brother
- Significant other: Matt Brody (Ex-Boyfriend, TV series); Cody Madison (Ex-Boyfriend); Unnamed Rock Star (Ex-Husband); Lorenzo (Husband); Ronnie Greenbaum (Boyfriend Film)
- Nationality: American

Casey Jean "C.J." Parker is a fictional character from the television series Baywatch. Portrayed by Pamela Anderson, she was one of the most popular and longest serving characters who appeared in five seasons of the series. Kelly Rohrbach plays her in the 2017 film.

== Background ==
When Baywatch executive producer David Hasselhoff offered the role of lifeguard C.J. Parker to Pamela Anderson, Anderson was immediately attracted to the role because of the "New Age thinking" that she shared with the character, including an interest in crystals, meditation, and dream interpretation. In the Baywatch: Hawaiian Wedding reunion movie, C.J. reveals her biggest interest is in meditation.

Pamela later reprised her role for appearances in commercials and other Baywatch themed media such as DirecTV.

C.J. had a largely different personality in the feature film adaptation, in which she is a down-to-earth but blunt person, engaged in a romantic relationship with new recruit Ronnie.

== Reception ==
C.J. Parker was well received during the run of Baywatch, being voted one of the best 11 blondes in entertainment by UGO.
