= Michelle (name) =

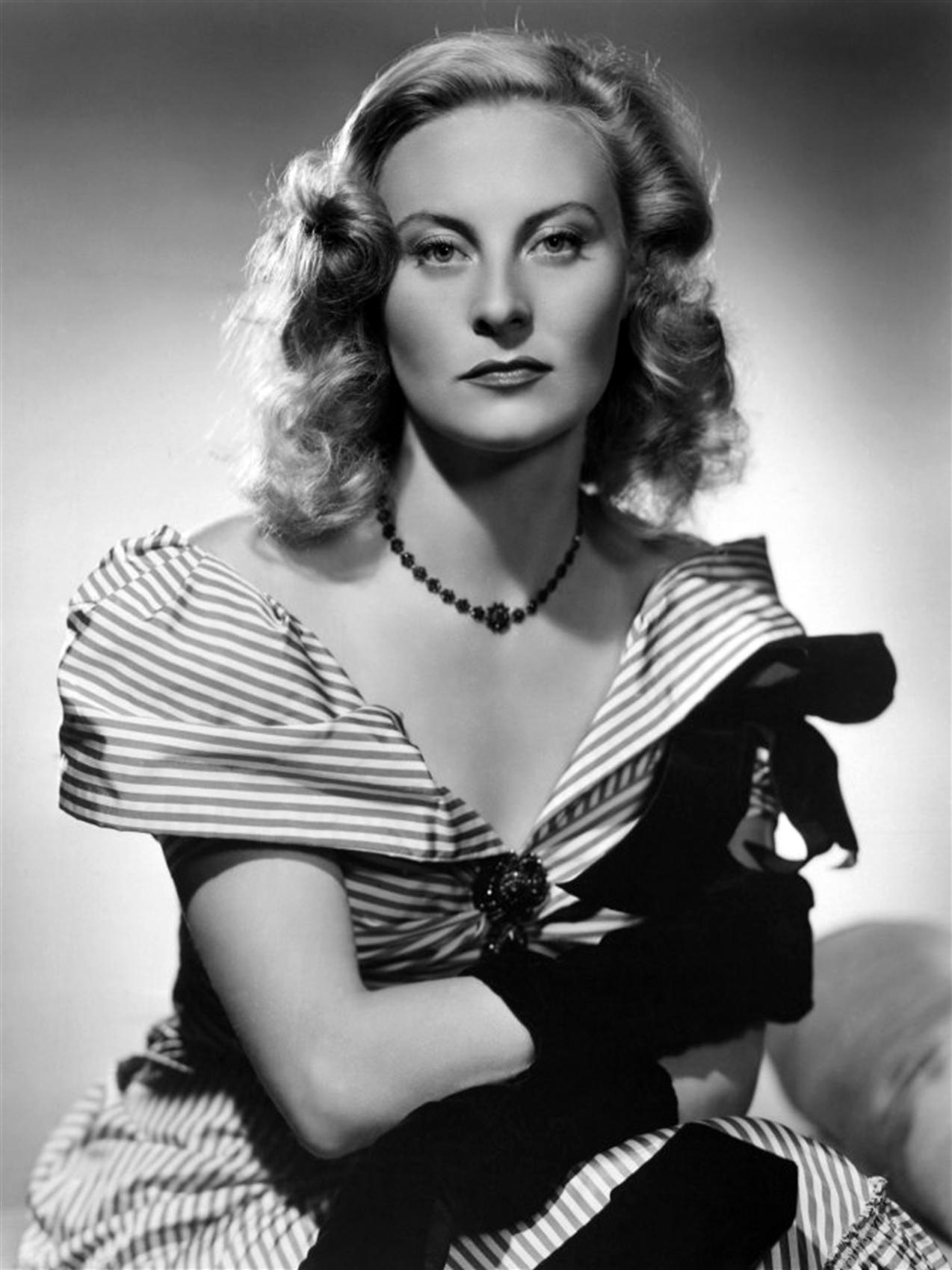
- French actress Michèle Morgan helped popularize the name Michelle.
- Pronunciation: /mɪˈʃɛl/ mish-EL
- Gender: Female

Origin
- Languages: Hebrew via French and English
- Meaning: "Who is like God?"

Other names
- Variant forms: Michele, Michaela, Michela, Micaela, Michalina
- Short forms: Chelle, Elle, Ellie, Elly, Shelley, Shelly
- Derived: Michèle
- Related names: Michael, Michaela, Michel, Ellie, Mitchell

Michelle is a given name, originally a variant of Michèle, the French feminine form of Michel, derived from the Hebrew name Michael meaning "Who is like God?". The usual Latin feminine form of the name was Michaela, with Michael the vernacular form for both men and women. The name was given in reference to the archangel Michael, a saint of the Roman Catholic Church. The usual French feminine form of the name was Micheline. The name Michelle was rare until the 20th century. It became a popular name in France and later throughout the Anglosphere after 1930, popularized by French-born film actress Michèle Morgan, who was born Simone Roussel. The name was further popularized by the 1965 hit Beatles song "Michelle". The name peaked in usage for American girls in 1968, when it was among the five most popular names for newborn girls. The name has since declined in popularity but remains in regular use in English-speaking as well as French-speaking countries.

It is also a surname.

== Variants and cognates ==
- Albanian: Miçel
- Arabic: ميشيل
- Armenian: Միշել
- Belarusian: Мішэль ( Mišeĺ)
- Bengali: মিশেল ( Miśēla)
- Bulgarian: Мишел, Микаела, Михаела
- Chinese Simplified: 米歇尔 (Mǐxiē'ěr)
- Chinese Traditional: 蜜雪兒(Mìxuě'ér)、米歇爾 (Mǐxiē'ěr)
- Czech: Michaela, Michala
- Danish: Mikaela, Mikkeline
- Finnish: Mikaela
- French: Michèle
- Georgian: მიშელ (Mishel)
- German: Michaela, Michi
- Greek: Μιχαέλα
- Gujarati: મિશેલ ( Miśēla)
- Hebrew: מישל
- Hindi: मिशेल ( Miśēla)
- Hungarian: Mihaéla
- Indonesian: Michelle, Michaela, Michela
- Italian: Micaela, Michela, Michelina, Lina
- Japanese: ミシェル ( Misheru)
- Kannada: ಮಿಚೆಲ್ (Micel)
- Khmer: មីឆែល (Mee-chael)
- Korean: 미셸 (Misyel)
- Marathi: मिशेल ( Miśēla)
- Mongolian: Мишээл ( Misheel)
- Norwegian: Mikaela
- Persian: میشل
- Polish: Michalina
- Portuguese: Micaela, Miguela
- Punjabi: ਮਿਸ਼ੇਲ ( Miśēla)
- Romanian: Mihaela
- Russian: Мишель (Mishel')
- Serbian: Мишел ( Mišel)
- Slovak: Michaela
- Slovene: Mihaela
- Spanish: Micaela, Miguela
- Swedish: Michaela, Mikaela
- Tamil: மைக்கேல் ( Maikkēl)
- Telugu: మిచెల్ ( Micel)
- Thai: มิเชล (Michel)
- Ukrainian: Михайлина (Mychajlyna)
- Urdu: مشیل
- Yiddish: מישעל ( Myşʻl)

== Notable people named Michelle ==
=== As given name ===
==== A–G ====
- Michelle Akers (born 1966), American footballer
- Michelle Andrews (born 1971), Australian field hockey midfielder
- Michelle Ang (born 1983), New Zealand actress
- Michelle Bachelet (born 1951), President of Chile
- Michelle Barr (born 1978), Scottish footballer
- Michelle Beadle (born 1975), American sportscaster
- Michelle Boisseau (1955–2017), American poet
- Michelle Bolsonaro (born 1982), Brazilian former First Lady
- Michelle Boylan, Australian politician
- Michelle Branch (born 1983), American rock singer
- Michelle Bright (died 1999), Australian murder victim
- Michelle Calkins, Canadian synchronized swimmer
- Michelle Caruso-Cabrera (born 1967), CNBC reporter
- Michelle Chamuel (born 1986), American singer
- Michelle Chandler (born 1974), Australian basketball player
- Michelle Chen (born 1983), Taiwanese actress
- Michelle Chong (born 1977), Singaporean actress and director
- Michelle Cliff (1946–2016), Jamaican-American author
- Michelle "Mickey" Coffino, American businessperson
- Michelle Collins (born 1962), English actress and television presenter
- Michelle Courtens (born 1981), Dutch singer, also known as "Michelle"
- Michelle Cruz (born 1992), American soccer defender
- Michelle Creber (born 1999), Canadian actress
- Michelle Dee (born 1995), Filipino beauty queen and actress
- Michelle Dilhara (born 1996), Sri Lankan actress
- Michelle Dockery (born 1981), English actress
- Michelle Dockrill (born 1959), Canadian politician
- Michelle DuBarry (1931–2026), Canadian drag queen
- Michelle Duggar (née Ruark), American reality TV star
- Michelle van Eimeren (born 1972), Australian model and beauty queen
- Michelle Fairley, Northern Irish actress
- Michelle Ferrari (born 1983), Italian pornographic actress and television personality
- Michelle Forbes (born 1965), actress
- Michelle Fournier (born 1977), Canadian hammer thrower
- Michelle Gayle (born 1971), English singer and actress
- Michelle Gildernew (born 1970), Sinn Féin Politician
- Michelle Gooris, Dutch airline pilot and YouTuber
- Michelle Go (1981–2022) Chinese-American murder victim
- Michelle Gomez (born 1966), Scottish actress
- Michelle González (born 1989), Puerto Rican basketball player
- Michelle Groskopf, street photographer

==== H–M ====
- Michelle Hamer (artist) (born 1975), Australian visual artist
- Michelle Hamer (author), Australian author and journalist
- Michelle Hardwick (born 1976), English actress
- Michelle Harper, brand consultant, entrepreneur, member of the International Best Dressed List
- Michelle Heaton (born 1979), British singer, TV personality and glamour model
- Michelle Hodkin, American author
- Michelle Hofmann, Australian politician
- Michelle Hu (born 1990), Chinese actress
- Michelle Hunziker (born 1977), Swiss television hostess, actress and fashion model
- Michelle Jaggard-Lai (born 1969), retired to professional tennis player from Australia
- Michelle Jenner (born 1986), Spanish actress
- Michelle Jin (born 1974), professional Chinese American bodybuilder
- Michelle Keegan (born 1987), English actress
- Michelle Khare (born 1992), American YouTuber
- Michelle Kraft (born 1989), German politician
- Michelle Kang, South Korea–born American politician
- Michelle Kroppen (born 1996), German archer
- Michelle Embree Ku, American politician
- Michelle Kwan (born 1980), American figure skater
- Michelle Laine, American fashion designer
- Michelle Langstone (born 1979), New Zealand actress
- Michelle Larcher de Brito (born 1993), Portuguese tennis player
- Michelle Leonard (born 1973), British singer and songwriter, now based in Berlin
- Michelle Leslie (born 1981), Australian model
- Michelle Lombardo (born 1983), American model and actress
- Michelle Lujan Grisham (born 1959), American lawyer and politician
- Michelle Madhok (born 1971), CEO of White Cat Media LLC
- Michelle Malkin (born 1970), American political columnist
- Michelle Marsh (born 1982), British Page Three girl
- Michelle McCool (born 1980), American retired professional wrestler and former middle school teacher
- Michelle McManus (born 1980), Scottish pop singer who won Pop Idol
- Michelle McLean (born 1972), former Miss Universe (1992) from Namibia
- Michelle McMurry-Heath, American immunologist
- Michelle Meldrum (1968–2008), guitarist
- Michelle Meunier (born 1956), French politician
- Michelle Christina Cerqueira Gomes Lopes (born 1989), Brazilian footballer
- Michelle Monaghan (born 1976), American actress
- Michelle Mone, Baroness Mone (born 1971), Scottish entrepreneur and parliamentarian
- Michelle Monkhouse (1991–2011), Canadian fashion model
- Michelle Mungall, Canadian politician

==== N–Z ====
- Michelle Nicastro (1960–2010), American actress and singer
- Michelle Obama (born 1964), Former First Lady of the United States of America
- Michelle Odinet, American lawyer
- Michelle Ongkingco (born 1978), American actress
- Michelle Payne (born 1985), Australian jockey and horse trainer
- Michelle Pfeiffer (born 1958), American actress
- Michelle Phillips (born 1944), American actress, singer, and member of The Mamas & the Papas
- Michelle Reis (born 1970), Hong Kong former actress, model and beauty pageant titleholder
- Michelle Rodriguez (born 1978), American actress
- Michelle Rohl (born 1965), American race walker
- Michelle Rojas (born 1987), American voice actress
- Michelle Ruff, American voice actress
- Michelle Ryan (born 1984), British actress
- Michelle Ryan, Australian choreographer, artistic director of Restless Dance Company
- Michelle K. Ryan (born 1973), Australian psychologist and academic
- Michelle Sagara (born 1963), Canadian author of fantasy literature
- Michelle Saniei
- Michelle Saram (born 1974), Singaporean actress, singer and businesswoman
- Michelle Sawatzky-Koop (born 1970), Canadian volleyball player
- Michelle Schatzman (1949–2010), French analyst and mathematician
- Michelle Senlis (1933–2020), French lyricist
- Michelle Ray Smith (born 1974), American actress
- Michelle Stephenson (born 1977), English singer-songwriter, known as ex member of the Spice Girls
- Michelle Thrush (born 1967), Canadian actress
- Michelle Tokarczyk (born 1953), American author and poet
- Michelle Trachtenberg (1985–2025), American actress
- Michelle Triola (1933–2009), American actress
- Michelle Valberg, Canadian nature and wildlife photographer
- Michelle Visage (born 1968), American media personality and judge on RuPaul's Drag Race
- Michelle Wai (born 1984), Hong Kong actress
- Michelle Wamboldt, Canadian writer
- Michelle Waterson (born 1986), American former mixed martial artist, actress, stuntwoman, and model
- Michelle Wie (born 1989), American golfer
- Michelle Williams (actress) (born 1980), American actress
- Michelle Williams (singer) (born 1979), American R&B artist from singing group Destiny's Child
- Michelle Wright (born 1961), Canadian country music artist
- Michelle Ye (born 1980), Chinese actress and producer
- Michelle Yeoh (born 1962), Malaysian-born Hong Kong actress
- Michelle Yim (born 1956), Hong Kong actress
- Michelle Zauner (born 1989), American musician, singer, songwriter, and author

=== As stage name ===
- Michel'le (born 1970), hip hop artist in the 1980s and 1990s
- Michelle (born 1972), German singer

=== As surname ===
- Candice Michelle (born 1978), American model, actress and retired professional wrestler
- Cara Michelle, American Playmate-of-the-month and actress
- Janee Michelle (born 1946), American actress
- Vicki Michelle (born 1950), British actress best known for playing as Yvette Carte-Blanche from the British sitcom 'Allo 'Allo!

== Fictional characters ==
- Michelle, a chef girl from Nordcurrent's game, Cooking Fever
- Michelle, the character from The Next Step, former member of A-Troupe and studio head, played Victoria Baldessara
- Michelle Connor in the British soap opera Coronation Street
- Michelle Corrigan in the British soap opera Doctors (2000 TV series)
- Michelle Chang in the Tekken series of fighting games
- Michelle Crane in the 2013 film Insidious: Chapter 2
- Michelle Dessler in the TV series 24
- Michelle Dubois in the TV series ''Allo 'Allo!
- Michelle Flaherty in the American Pie film series
- Michelle Fowler in the British soap opera EastEnders
- Michelle Peng in Juken Sentai Gekiranger
- Michelle Rausch, Gwyneth Paltrow's character in Two Lovers
- Michelle Richardson in the UK TV series Skins
- Michelle Scully in the Australian soap opera Neighbours
- Michelle Tanner in the TV series Full House
- Michelle Jones (MJ) in the Marvel Cinematic Universe film series
