= Fashion blog =

Blog covering fashion industry, clothing, and lifestyle

Fashion blogs are blogs that cover the fashion industry, clothing, and lifestyle related topics.

== Definition ==
A fashion blog can cover many topics, such as specific items of clothing and accessories, beauty tips, trends in various apparel markets (haute couture, prêt-à-porter, etc.), celebrity fashion choices, and street fashion trends. They cover fashion at all levels, from the largest fashion design houses to the smallest independent designers.

== Impact on the fashion industry ==
Fashion is a multi-billion-dollar industry that has considerable impact on the way ordinary people dress and present themselves. It relies heavily on media and advertising to communicate the producer's preferences and goals, and to influence public perception through various types of promotion. Fashion can be influenced by social change and countertrends outside the producer, retailer, or advertiser's control. As fashion is driven by trends both inside and outside the fashion industry, fashion blogs and other "new media" outside the control of traditional establishments represent a disruptive innovation to the social dynamics of mass media and fashion consumption in modern consumer society. The blogosphere will likely have a considerable long-term influence on the industry, as the number of fashion-based blogs continues to grow with increasing numbers of consumers able to create and modify the media that they consume, and traditional producers and advertisers adapting their practices to avoid dilution of their influence.

=== From the industry's standpoint ===
During the 2011 New York City Fashion Week, top-tier fashion designers Lazaro Hernandez and Jack McCollough, owners and designers of Proenza Schouler, were interviewed by Imran Ahmed, founder and editor of The Business of Fashion website. The two fashion designers were asked various questions from an audience of fashion bloggers, including their personal opinions on the effects of fashion blog writing, how it influences the fashion industry, and how fashion blog posts affect their designing and selling process. When asked about their thoughts on the overall effect of the fashion blogs, McCollough stated, "Blogs posting things about us, going viral, spreading throughout the internet… it has an extraordinary impact on the business". They also stated how in the past, they would have to wait for three or four days to hear a review on their line, but now the feedback comes almost instantly. When asked about how the blogs directly affect their own designs, they explained that while they do read numerous blogs daily, they try to take each criticism, positive or negative, with a grain of salt, "We try not to obsess over it" stated McCollough.

Founder of Independent Fashion Blogger (IFB) Jennine Jacob stated how thrilled she was to get validation from high-end fashion designers such as Proenza Schouler. Imran Amed stated that there will always be designers and editors who will never fully wrap their heads around the huge impact fashion blogging and social media has on the industry, but on the other side of the spectrum, there are numerous designers, editors, branders, and writers that do understand and are "coming on board". He also states that this is a fairly new phenomenon that will take time for the fashion world to reap the full benefits.

The New York Times "Style" section writer, Eric Wilson, did an extensive study on the impact of fashion bloggers on the fashion industry for one of his style columns. Wilson wrote that these bloggers have ascended "from the nosebleed seats to the front row" in the past year and that the divide between the "high code" editors with a professional opinion and the "amateur" fashion bloggers is beginning to disintegrate. Wilson interviewed prominent publicists, editors, and designers. Publicist Kelly Cutrone stated that over the past two years, there has been a complete change in who writes about fashion. Not only does Cutrone say she needs to keep a watch on the editors of mainstream writings, such as Vogue and Elle, but now she needs to monitor the millions of fashion bloggers around the world. Cutrone later states that once these bloggers post anything on the internet, it never comes off, and it now becomes the first thing that the designers will see.

=== From a reader’s standpoint ===
The blogosphere has opened up many doors for the fashion industry, one of which is allowing the ordinary people to partake in the "elite" fashion world and discuss their likes and dislikes on the way fashion is presented in the media. In 2008, the Pulitzer Prize winning fashion writer and former blogger Robin Givhan claimed that fashion blogs had democratized the fashion industry. Givhan had also written in Harper's Bazaar that "The rise of the fashion blogger has evolved [fashion] from an aristocratic business dominated by omnipotent designers into a democratic one in which everyone has access to stylistic clothes...the average people, too often estranged from fashion, is not taking ownership of it". A similar statement was said by Constance White, the style director for eBay and former fashion journalist, saying that the impact of the fashion blogosphere has allowed the whole population to take ownership of the fashion world, including people of all different races, genders, and social standings.

Unlike fashion-focused magazines and television shows, fashion blogs are able to be updated more frequently, keeping up to date with the new and up-and-coming fashion trends.

=== From an advertising standpoint ===
Many of these fashion blogs also serve as a source of advertisement for both designers and fashion retail stores. These advertisements have had a heavy influence on fashion designers of various standings, helping to give a name to small up-and-coming designers as well as bringing high-end designers back to life. Many of the top fashion bloggers are said to have received free samples of the designer pieces that they have mentioned in their blogs and some top fashion bloggers got paid for wearing and publishing a brand name product on their Instagram account.

In a study conducted through the Biz360 Community, it was found that over 53% of the New York City Fashion Week converge had come from online articles and fashion blogs. While a vast portion of what was written in these blogs came from various mainstream fashion resource magazines and newspaper articles, such as Coutorture and New York Magazine, these fashion blogs provided a larger viewing and reading audience for the fashion week.

In the past years, American Express has become increasingly involved in New York City Fashion Week. In 2010 American Express sponsored Evolving Influence, the first international bloggers' conference in New York City, during which many surveys and studies took place about the usefulness and tactics used in fashion blogs. Through the study, it was found that bloggers are more comfortable reporting in real-time and incorporating social tools in their opinions of runway trends and designers. After Fashion Week, it was found that 6.37% of all articles written about or related to Fashion Week had mentioned the Evolving Influence main sponsor, American Express. These blogs were not directly paid to mention American Express, so they served as a free source of advertisement for American Express.

== Number of fashion blogs ==
There is considerable disagreement regarding the number of fashion blogs in existence. In a February 2006 Women's Wear Daily article, Corcoran stated:

There is an enormous, and growing, number of fashion and shopping-related blogs: about 2 million, according to Technorati Inc., [...] or slightly less than 10 percent of the 27 million blogs the company tracks. (That number includes blogs in languages that use the Roman alphabet and that contain anything fashion-related, including sites such as Pink Is the New Blog, which focuses on celebrities.)

This figure is likely inflated by many personal blogs that mention fashion, as opposed to those using the criteria above.

All other estimates of the popularity of fashion blogs are considerably lower. In September 2005, La Ferla stated that "as little as a year ago, the number of [fashion bloggers] could be counted in the dozens. Today there are hundreds". Lara Zamiatin estimated in November 2006 that there are now "several hundred fashion blogs".

In March 2019, UK-based communications technology company Vuelio released a blogging industry report white paper containing longitudinal survey data (collected annually 2016-2018) and subsequent analysis. The top five blog categories were identified as: Fashion & Beauty, Lifestyle, Parenting, Food & Drink and Travel. In fact, these five "supersectors" collectively on average accounted for two-thirds of all blogs. A key finding was a marked decrease in Fashion & Beauty category blogs over this three-year period. As a percentage of all blogs, Fashion & Beauty was reported at the following levels per year: 22% in 2016, 13% in 2017, and 8% in 2018.

“[Fashion & Beauty] has seen the biggest drop in number of blogs from 2016, and as this category is most likely to attract between 1,000 – 10,000 unique visitors per month (medium size), it suggests that the market for this topic is in decline.”

== Types of fashion blogs ==
=== By writer's expertise ===
Fashion blogs may be written by insiders, outsiders, or aspiring insiders.

Insiders are people who work or have previously worked in the fashion industry or for the traditional fashion media. In addition, some fashion insiders write occasionally as guest bloggers on larger sites. For example, the fashion designer Nanette Lepore has contributed to Glam.com.

Outsiders are people who know a lot (or at least have strong opinions) about fashion, usually by virtue of being very dedicated consumers of fashion.

Aspiring insiders are people who want to work in the fashion industry or media and believe their blog may provide a "back door" entry into a mainstream fashion writing job.

=== By ownership ===
Fashion blogs may be owned either by individuals or by companies.

The types of individuals running fashion blogs are listed above.

The types of companies now running fashion blogs include large mainstream media organizations and fashion retailers. Condé Nast Publications is a mainstream media organization with fashion blogs. Fashion retailers with blogs include Bluefly, Queen of Suburbia, and Splendora.

== History ==
Fashion blogs first appeared in the blogosphere prior to 2002. Both the number of fashion blogs and the number of media mentions of fashion blogs has grown considerably since then. Published accounts of the growing number of fashion blogs are mentioned above, and a Facteva search reveals that media articles mentioning "fashion blogs" grew from one in 2002 to over 100 in 2006.

In 2006, the commercial success and growing profile of the fashion bloggers were the two main themes in the coverage of fashion blogs.

In 2009, CNN wrote about a blogger, Rumi Neely of Fashion Toast, who went from a small website to the runway for a popular label.

=== Early fashion blogs ===
Fashion blogs first appeared in the blogosphere prior to 2002, and Kathryn Finney, founder of Budget Fashionista, was invited to New York Fashion Week as early as September 2003. A short time later, Fashiontribes.com was being seated fourth row at shows like Bill Blass. Paris-based American fashion blogger Diane Pernet, founder of A Shaded View on Fashion, has been called "the original style blogger" by The New York Times and has been a fashion blogger since 2005.

In 2004, Bryan Grey-Yambao founded his namesake blog Bryanboy. He helped set the standards for designer “gifting” and disclosure of the same in the fashion blogosphere; an area where it is currently considered acceptable for a blogger to take international airfare, accommodation, designer goods and sometimes even celebrity-style appearance fees from the major brands they cover.

By 2008, Tina Craig and Kelly Cook of Bag Snob.com were seated second row at shows like Diane von Furstenberg and Oscar de la Renta.

In 2004, Michelle Madhok introduced SheFinds.com, "an online shopping publication". By 2005, the site earned $300,000 per year, although most of that revenue went towards running expenses and Madhok paid herself just $40,000 per year.

=== Mainstream media acceptance of fashion blogging ===
Fashion blogs are increasingly becoming a part of the mainstream fashion press.

An increasing number of fashion bloggers were invited to designers' fashion shows in 2006 compared to previous years. Large advertisers like H&M and Gap have bought advertising on fashion blogs, and other large companies like the underwear-maker Jockey are targeting fashion blogs in their PR efforts.

Many big media organizations have started fashion blogs and the best fashion bloggers are now also being offered mainstream media positions.

Fashion blogging is also now regarded as worthy of mainstream media coverage. The reference list below shows the media publications that have written about fashion blogs. These publications include The Wall Street Journal, The New York Times, Fast Company and The Sydney Morning Herald.

=== Commercialization of fashion blogging ===
Fashion blogging is rapidly becoming a highly profitable new media business, with a mixture of independent blogs and well-funded fashion blog networks competing to dominate the space.

Other commercially successful independent fashion blogs include Budget Fashionista, which reportedly brings in $600,000 a year in revenue and The Bag Snob, which "generates a six-figure income, mainly from advertising". By 2008 SheFinds.com was generating $400,000 in revenue per year. Personal style blogger Aimee Song from SongofStyle.com has told WWD that she gets paid anywhere from a couple thousand to $50,000 for hosting an event or Instagramming a brand.

There have also been a series of business deals that have brought serious investor money into the fashion blogging space. These include:

- October 2006: Sugar Publishing Inc. raised Series A funding from legendary venture capital firm Sequoia to a rumored value of $5 million. Sugar's small blog network includes FabSugar, a fashion blog.
- November 2006: Glam.com raised $18.5 million in Series C venture capital from a consortium led by Duff Ackerman & Goodrich Ventures, with other investors including "Draper Fisher Jurvetson, which helped launch eBay, Accel Partners, an investor in Facebook, as well as WaldenVC and Information Capital".
- October 2007: Sugar Publishing purchased early fashion blog network Coutorture Media for an undisclosed sum.

== See also ==
- Personal style blogger
