= Michalka =

Michalka (/mɪˈhɑːlkə/) is a surname, often of Czech and Slovak origin. It can also be a nickname for Michaela.

People with the surname include:

- Aly Michalka (born 1989), American singer, actress, and member of Aly & AJ
- AJ Michalka (born 1991), American singer, actress, and member of Aly & AJ
