= Johnny Royal =

American film director and composer

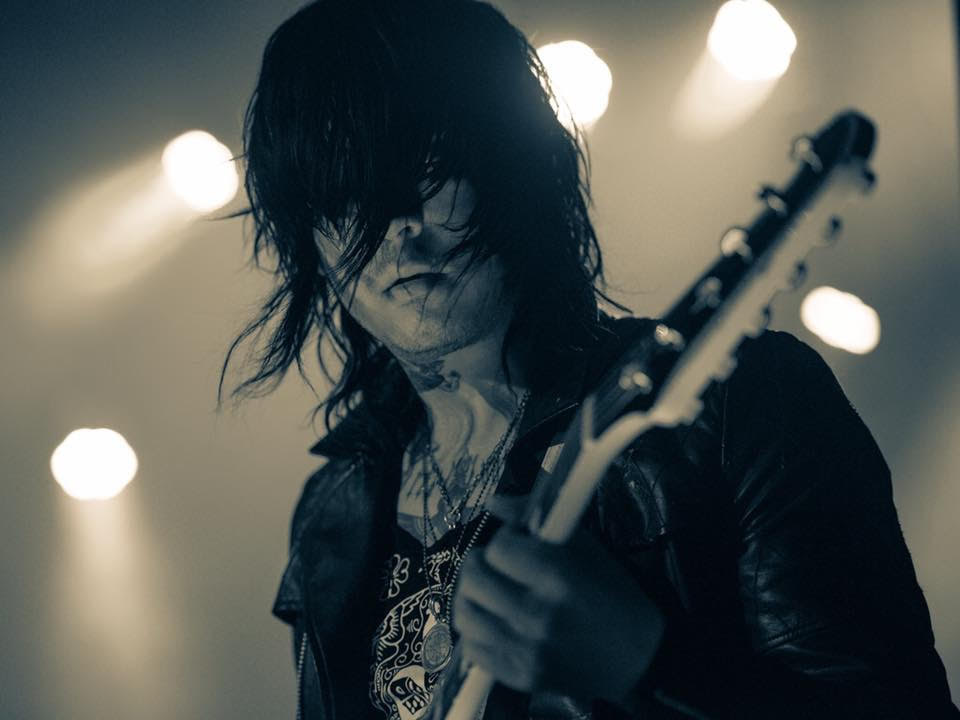
Johnny Royal

Johnny Royal (born John Michael Herrera, June 12, 1976) is an American film director and composer.

He is best known for writing and directing the documentary films 33 & Beyond: The Royal Art of Freemasonry (2017) and Illuminated: The True Story of the Illuminati (2019), works on esoteric history and secret societies. He also wrote an episode and was cast in the television series Longmire (2012-2017), and is the director of the television series American Magick (2025-Present).

As a composer, Royal is best known as the founding member of the industrial rock band Black Lodge, and for his compositions, which have appeared on numerous hit television series, including VH1, The Chelsea Handler Show, and LA Ink. He has written with several notable musicians, including Jeordie White, aka Twiggy Ramirez, Gilby Clarke, Sean Beavan, and Grammy-nominated producer Johnny K.

== Early life and education ==
Royal was born in Zaragoza, Spain, at the Zaragoza Air Base on June 12, 1976. His father, John Herrera, was a Colonel in the U.S. Air Force and served as Director of SIGINT (Signals Intelligence) for the National Reconnaissance Office (NRO). His mother, Lynne Johnson-Christy (née Smith), worked in field intelligence for a U.S. General. The family's military and intelligence background would later influence his interest and work in national security and film genres related to the occult and supernatural. At age 4, Royal's mother took him to the movies to watch the film An American Werewolf in London (1981). This was his first theatre experience, which kicked off his interest in horror, occult, and supernatural storytelling.

Royal attended Saint Vincent College on a scholarship, where he earned a Bachelor of Science in Finance with a minor in Accounting, and was awarded the Wall Street Journal Scholarship. He later earned an MBA in International Finance from the University of Westminster in London.

== Career ==
=== Finance and national security ===
Royal began his career at Morgan Stanley in the World Trade Center, New York City, where he worked as an equity underwriter, institutional equity trader, and broker. Following the September 11, 2001, terror attacks on the U.S., he transitioned from finance to roles within the intelligence and defense communities.

His work has included consulting on financial intelligence, counterterrorism, and defense strategy. He has contributed to counterintelligence efforts, focusing on analyzing financial flows and surveillance methodologies.

Royal has consulted for national intelligence agencies and the U.S. Space Force, advising on advanced technologies, including UAV weapon systems, quantum computing, and AI-driven geospatial intelligence.

=== DARPA and strategic innovation ===
In 2010, as the CEO and Chairman of Luthier Society, Inc., Royal worked with other CEOs from the defense industry in partnership with the Defense Advanced Research Projects Agency (DARPA) to discuss the major challenges to America's national security. This was the first DARPA summit held in Washington, D.C., during Dr. Regina Dugan's tenure. He also contributed to defense projects, including the DARPA Red Balloon Challenge, a geospatial intelligence and crowdsourced problem-solving initiative.

=== Firearms and public safety ===
Royal is a certified firearms instructor with the National Rifle Association (NRA) and the U.S. Department of Justice (DOJ), and has taught courses on firearms safety and tactical application.

== Personal life ==
Royal is married to film producer Angel Royal, and the couple has two children, River Royal and Astarte Royal. His son, River, received his first film credit at age seven for assisting with direction on Illuminated.

In September 2015, LA Weekly reported that Royal was dating Carmen Electra.

== Film, television, and music career ==
=== Filmography ===
Year	Title	Role	Notes
2017	33 & Beyond: The Royal Art of Freemasonry	Director, Writer, Producer	Documentary film
2017	Longmire	Writer/Cast	1 episode (TV series)
2019	Illuminated: The True Story of the Illuminati	Director, Writer	Documentary film
2024	Masters of the Royal Secret	Director, Writer	Documentary film
2025	American Magick	Creator, Director, Writer	

=== Discography ===
Royal has composed original scores for his film and television projects. He was a founding member of the industrial rock band Black Lodge. His music credits include appearances on VH1, Chelsea Lately, and LA Ink.

Music videos as Black Lodge
Year	Title	Type
2013	Never Clean	EP
2013	Drag	EP
2014	Thankful	EP
2014	A Thousand Faces	EP
2014	Firewalker	EP
2014	Breviculum	EP
2015	Thoughts	Single
