= Undressed =

American anthology series

- Genre: Comedy drama anthology
- Created by: Roland Joffé
- Directed by: Roland Joffé
- Composers: Brian Friedman; Jim McKeever; Jason L. Mattia; Didier Rachou; Adam Sanborne; Raney Shockne
- Country of origin: United States
- Original language: English
- No. of seasons: 6
- No. of episodes: 223

Production
- Executive producers: Roland Joffé; Dale Roy Robinson (2000–2001); Jule Selbo (2000–2001)
- Producers: Claudio Castravelli; Page Feldman; Kathryn Riccio; Lawrence Kane (2002); Dale Roy Robinson; Jeremiah Samuels
- Camera setup: Single-camera
- Running time: 22–24 minutes

Original release
- Network: MTV
- Release: July 26, 1999 – September 5, 2002

Undressed is an American anthology series that aired on MTV from July 26, 1999, to September 5, 2002. The series was created and executive produced by British director Roland Joffé.

== Synopsis ==
The series follows the relationships (both romantic and sexual) of young people, often high schoolers, college students, and twenty-somethings in the Los Angeles area. The series was controversial for its frank discussions about sex, including depictions of promiscuous behavior between teens as well as same-sex relationships.

Each season had several recurring characters with each episode focused on two or three specific characters with plotlines presented as interwoven vignettes. Some stories concluded at each season's end while others continued with variable duration. Undressed ran for six seasons, from July 26, 1999, to September 5, 2002.

The series featured early performances by actors who went on to more popular roles in television and cinema.

== Cast ==
=== Season 1 (1999) ===
Season 1 ran from July to September 1999, and had 30 episodes.

Cast members included:

- Dante Basco (Jake)
- Marc Blucas (Billy)
- Sam Doumit (Jana)
- Reagan Gomez-Preston (Jackie)
- Nicholas Gonzalez (Andy)
- Christina Hendricks (Rhiannon)
- Erica Hubbard (Jenny)
- Jon Huertas (Evan)
- Frankie Ingrassia (Samantha)
- Bryce Johnson (Cliff)
- Brandon Keener (Theo)
- Trevor Lissauer (Z)
- Sarah Lancaster (Liz)
- Thad Luckinbill (Kyle)
- Peter Paige (Kirk)
- Pedro Pascal (Greg)
- Christopher Pettiet (Dean)
- Eyal Podell (Joel)
- Nick Stabile (Dave)
- Bree Turner (Tina)

=== Season 2 (2000) ===
Season 2 ran from February to March 2000, and had 30 episodes.

Notable cast members included:

- Rukiya Bernard (Talia)
- Anastasia Horne (Lori)
- Sara Downing (Terry)
- Rose Freymuth-Frazier (Joy)
- Jay Hernandez (Eddie)
- Travis Wester (Burke)
- Ali Hillis (Kim)
- Chad Michael Murray (Dan)
- Katee Sackhoff (Annie)
- Darryl Stephens (Rudy)
- Jason Thompson (Miles)
- Jerry Trainor (Eric)
- Cerina Vincent (Kitty)
- Lauren Woodland (Anika)
- J. August Richards (Bryce)

=== Season 3 (2000) ===
Season 3 lasted from July to August 2000, and had 30 episodes.

Notable cast members included:

- Aimee Allen (Molly)
- Kristina Anapau (Roxy)
- Adam Brody (Lucas)
- Marcus Coloma (Charlie)
- Kelly Donovan (Jacob)
- Stephane Eitel
- Jason David Frank (Carl)
- Lauren German (Kimmy)
- Max Greenfield (Victor)
- Bret Harrison (Skeet)
- Alyson Kiperman (Janice)
- Iyari Limon (Cindy)
- Diane Mizota (Katy)
- Sam Page (Sam)
- Jason Ritter (Allan)
- Brandon Routh (Wade)

=== Season 4 (2001) ===
Season 4 ran from January to March 2001, and had 40 episodes.

Notable cast members included:

- Brandon Beemer (Lucas)
- Johnny Lewis (Ray)
- Sarah Jane Morris (Paula)
- Alisan Porter (Belinda)
- Beth Riesgraf (Loretta)
- Michelle Ongkingco (Trudi)

=== Season 5 (2001) ===
Season 5 ran from July to September 2001, and had 40 episodes.

Notable cast members included:

- Katie Aselton (Kim)
- Scott Clifton (Caleb)
- Mike Erwin (Lyle)
- Autumn Reeser (Erica)
- Adrienne Wilkinson (Lois)
- Jennifer Tisdale (Betsy)

=== Season 6 (2002) ===
Season 6 ran from June to September 2002, and had 52 episodes. It was produced in Canada, utilizing mainly Canadian actors.

Notable cast members included:

- Natalie Brown (Brianne)
- Karen Cliche (Marissa)
- Rachelle Lefevre (Annie)
- Kim Poirier (Holly)
- Victoria Sanchez (Frannie)
- Anna Silk (Becca)
- Sarah Smyth (Julie)
- Michael Urie (Justin)
- Elizabeth Whitmere (Jasmine)

== Production notes ==
Michael Grodner and Swith Bell were the show's head writers, whereas Neil Landau served as the co-head writer. Jennifer M. Johnson was a writer for the series.

Undressed was filmed in Los Angeles for the first five seasons, and in Montreal, Quebec, Canada for the sixth and final season.

== Syndication ==
In January 2010, episodes briefly ran on Logo.

== Future ==
In November 2018, it was reported that a reboot of the series was in the works at MTV Studios with original series creator Roland Joffé as executive producer. Said Pamela Post (Head of Scripted Programming for MTV Studios, MTV, VH1 and Logo): "Undressed was ahead of its time and we're looking forward to developing the series for a whole new generation. Much has changed in the dating/relationship world since the series first premiered and we're excited to showcase how both have evolved."

== Awards and nominations ==
Year	Award	Result	Category	Recipient
2003	GLAAD Media Award	Won	Outstanding Daily Drama	-
