= Personal style blogger =

Type of blogger covering fashion and lifestyle

A personal style (or fashion) blogger is an individual who manages an online platform that covers several aspects of fashion. These blogs, often produced independently, post pictures of the blogger to show their outfits and lifestyle to a number of followers. They influence consumer taste and preferences, often functioning as an intermediary between businesses and consumer. From a company perspective, the blogger is perceived as a promotional tool. From the consumer side, high-reputation bloggers are considered opinion leaders. For the blogger, this often results in material benefits, rewards, branded fashion clothing and paid sponsorship, as well as status in the field of fashion.

== Background ==
=== Beginnings ===
The first blog created was Links.net in 1994, by Justin Hall, a college student. At this period, Links.net was not referred to as being a blog but rather a personal homepage.

It was not until 1997 that the word Weblog was created, by Jorn Barger and in 1999, the word was shortened to Blog, by a programmer called Peter Herholz. During the same year, Pyra Labs introduced Blogger, one of the earliest blog publishing tool. After 1999, bloggers started gaining popularity.

A study published by Kaye in 2007 shows that in 1999 about 50 blogs were created, however, it reached an exponential growth and by 2005 about 8 million blogs were recorded. Also, 27% of all the internet users accessed blog and about 12% have posted a comment or link on those site. The trend of creating and or reading blogs kept on increasing and in 2008, the blogosphere accounted 184 million blogs and 346 million readers.

=== Evolution ===
In 2003, Not good For Me, the first fashion blog, was introduced the web mainstream. Fashion blogging dominated the blogosphere with an unlimited access to social media platform open to anyone. It was around that period, where fashion blogs were becoming popular. According to a Survey conducted by AOL in 2005, 50% of American bloggers used blog as a therapeutic tool against 7.5% who used it for politics purpose. Moreover, a phone survey carried by Pew Internet Project, shows that bloggers used blog as a description of their personal experience. The platform Bloggers have listed more than 2 million as being within the industry of fashion.

Therefore, after 2002, the blogosphere was mainly covered by fashion blogs. Starting from that period, fashion bloggers gain importance within the fashion industry, and mainly in playing the role of intermediate between businesses and consumers. Finally, the blogosphere had become a key space for the production, promotion, communication and finally circulation of fashion discourse.

== Trajectory ==
The fashion system in the early years, was highly restricted and limited to fashion professional. However, the introduction of Web 2.0, access to information and the falling barrier between cultures, countries, and continent had created a globalization of taste. This recent phenomenon has enable ordinary consumers and fashion professional to reach a mass audience.

=== From a personal diary to a taste display ===
Most fashion bloggers, either famous or on the process of being so, will start a blog mainly to share their daily lifestyle. They start by being constantly connected and ready to answer follower's comments and follower request.

As their followers keep growing, bloggers enter a stage of taste display. In this specific stage, bloggers are in a position where their taste is used as a reference for their followers but also as a strategy of differentiation. A blogger acquire taste within the fashion industry through its cultural capital as mentioned by Bourdieu (1999). They exercise taste and make a display of it for public consumption and taste assertion. A universally acceptable taste is required for a fashion blogger in order to succeed.

=== From a virtual community to a mass audience ===
Once the blog has become a well-established taste display space, the blogger begins a personal relationship with followers, and answer their comments as an ordinary participant. However, as they start to ignore their followers, he or she starts to build an audience. This is known as taste leadership.

=== From curating to modeling ===
Most bloggers start their post with a selection and organisation of clothes using software. In the beginning of their blogging process, most bloggers barely appear in the pictures. However, as this specific stage of curating becomes redundant, the blogger needs another step to keep followers and provide them with new innovative posts. Therefore, the next stage is modelling. The blogger starts taking the blog seriously and invests in a professional camera in order to take pictures of themselves wearing several outfits that will later be displayed in their blog. In that stage, rather than posting clothing taste, the individual starts developing a professional lifestyle.

Therefore, fashion bloggers go from curating to snapshots to modelling. In all three stages, the followers keep increasing. There is an ongoing investment in cultural capital, where not only connections get created but taste also starts improving.

== Platforms ==
Several platforms are used for blogging, ranging from specific blog platform to regular social media platforms. The following list present the some blogging platform used by personal fashion bloggers.

- WordPress
- Blogger
- Tumblr
- Wix
- Medium
- Ghost
- Squarespace
- Google+

== Influential fashion bloggers ==
Although self-established, fashion bloggers that reach a mass audience gain a significant influence on consumers and thus influence fashion trends each season. These bloggers are called influential bloggers.

Fashion magazine Fashionista listed some of the most influential personal fashion bloggers in 2016, the most notable being:

- Chiara Ferragni, The Blonde Salad
- Aimee Song, Song of Style
- Julia Engel, Gal Meets Glam
- Danielle Bernstein, We Wore What
- Julie Sariñana, Sincerely Jules
- Blair Eadie, Atlantic-Pacific

Other notable fashion/lifestyle bloggers with large, engaged followings on social media include:

- Sarah Tripp, Sassy Red Lipstick
- Rachel Parcell, Pink Peonies
- Courtney Quinn, Color Me Courtney
- Amber Fillerup, Barefoot Blonde
- Cara Loren, Cara Loren
- Christine Andrew, Hello Fashion Blog

== Outcomes ==
Several incentives influence bloggers passion and enthusiasm towards their blogging activities. The two main incentive which are economical and social were discussed by McQuarrie, Edward F., Miller, Jessica, Philips and Barbara J. and are listed below.

=== Economical ===
There are several form of economical rewards. The most common ones are Branded Fashion clothing, paid ad-placement, and paid sponsorship of their blog contest. This process enables them to become a key promotional tool for brand. Those rewards vary from small bloggers to large and influential bloggers.

=== Social ===
Using Bourdieu's idea of cultural capital, McQuarrie, Edward F., Miller, Jessica, Philips and Barbara J. have developed two sociological explanations to personal style bloggers social outcome: Taste of Judgement and Accumulation of cultural capital. Once they reach a mass audience and become famous, those personal fashion bloggers acquire a higher social mobility within the social strata of the fashion industry. For instance, many of them receive invitations to exclusive parties, Designer open houses, charity appearance mentioned in the media and so on. All these access to fashion professional, provide them with networking opportunity, helping them increase their social mobility. Therefore, a fashion blogger success comes from joining the traditional fashion system, rather than disconnecting it from it.

== Impact ==
Personal style bloggers have the potential to alter and confront the social norms constructed within the fashion industry. Fashion platforms allow for bloggers to freely express themselves and are not subject to the restricted binaries the fashion media content. Personal style bloggers can differentiate themselves from mainstream fashion, by cultivating and broadcasting their styles outside of the influence of advertisers and large corporations. Therefore, personal style bloggers have more freedom to showcase their fashion and potentially disrupt the industry illustration of trends. Becoming a profitable full-time fashion blogger is very difficult, as the ability to generate revenue through consulting and advertisements is very inconsistent, resulting in may fashion bloggers to pursue it as an activity. Although, the individuals who decide to self-brand themselves rely on social media and other platforms to build a brand and gain relationships with followers. Social media, therefore, majorly contribute to the impact personal styles have on the fashion industry.

=== Gay personal style bloggers ===
Previously, fashion was seen as more feminine than masculine, so when the male fashion industry started to develop, it tried to distance itself from femininity as much as possible, and one of the ways this was done was by excluding gay men from the demographic it was trying reach. Men's fashion tends to showcase dominant masculine ideals, and although the industry has now accepted gay men, the style still tends to follow the typical heteronormative ideals. Personal style blogs have allowed for homosexual men to include themselves back into the fashion world and gave them a platform to express themselves. This allows for a larger, more diverse representation of male style outside of the trends depicted in the traditional fashion industry.

Within the Fashion industry, gender is constructed into a fixed idea of what individual's appearance should be. These structured guidelines formed by society are largely enforced by the fashion industry to regulate what is deemed acceptable, thus, emphasizing the ideal 'heterosexual man'. As a result, personal style bloggers attempt to break these gender binaries representing society's idea of masculinity. Moreover, personal style bloggers can differentiate themselves from print fashion representation, through personal takes on contemporary looks. As male models are continuously depicted in an unachievable way, fashion bloggers can present an alternative to the fashion industries typical portrayal of men. They offer different representation concerning height, weight, and physical appearance. This ends up promoting inclusivity in the fashion industry and allows for a more substantial demographic to relate to their content.

== See also ==
- Fast fashion
