= Carmen Electra (album) =

Studio album by Carmen Electra
- Released: February 9, 1993
- Recorded: 1991–1992
- Studio: Paisley Park, Chanhassen, Minnesota
- Genre: Hip hop
- Length: 43:57
- Label: Paisley Park, Warner Bros. 25379
- Producer: Prince

Singles from Carmen Electra
- 1. "Go Go Dancer" Released: June 18, 1992; 2. "Everybody Get on Up" Released: January 21, 1993; 3. "Fantasia Erotica" Released: August 5, 1993

Professional ratings
Review scores
Source	Rating
AllMusic	3/5 stars
Select	2/5 medals

Carmen Electra is the only studio album by American actress/singer Carmen Electra, released in 1993 under American singer Prince's label Paisley Park.

== Background ==
The album was a project designed by Prince to promote Electra, his latest protégée at the time, as a sexy female rapper. After Electra didn't make the cut for an all girl group under the same label, Prince contacted Electra and stated that Electra should be her own separate artist. Prince also gave Electra her stage name with the production of the album, after an unreleased song he produced for her called Carmen On Top, stating that she shouldn't go by her birth name Tara and instead have a new identity under the name "Carmen" and added "Electra" due to her "electrifying" dance moves. The album features music written by Prince with some input by band member Levi Seacer Jr. Lyrics were provided by Prince, along with Seacer, The New Power Generation rapper Tony M. and female rapper Monie Love.

== Reception ==
Three singles were released from the album: "Go-Go Dancer", "Everybody Get on Up", and "Fantasia Erotica". The album was not well received and effectively ended Electra's recording career. In interviews, she has pointed out that during the time of the album's release, Prince was having problems with his label, which could have contributed to its failure.

== Track listing ==
No.	Title	Length
1.	"Go Go Dancer"	4:45
2.	"Good Judy Girlfriend"	1:59
3.	"Go On (Witcha Bad Self)"	4:09
4.	"Step to the Mic"	3:16
5.	"S.T."	4:03
6.	"Fantasia Erotica"	4:36
7.	"Everybody Get on Up"	4:01
8.	"Segue" (Instrumental)	0:29
9.	"Fun"	3:42
10.	"Just a Little Lovin'"	4:02
11.	"Segue" (Instrumental)	0:46
12.	"All That"	4:29
13.	"Segue" (Instrumental)	0:12
14.	"This Is My House"	3:28

=== Samples ===
- "S.T." samples "Skin Tight" by Ohio Players
- "Everybody Get on Up" samples "Get on Up" by The Esquires and "Singers" by Eddie Murphy
- "Fun" samples the "ah yeah" part from "Here We Go (Live at the Funhouse)" by Run-DMC
- "All That" samples "Adore" by Prince

== Personnel ==
- Art director – Greg Ross
- Background vocals – Carmen Electra, Kathleen Johnson, Monie Love, N.P.G., The Steeles
- Horns – Atlanta Bliss, Eric Leeds
- Engineer – Joe Blaney, Mark Forrester, Coke Johnson, Michael Koppelman, Steve Noonan, Susan Rogers
- Engineer assistants – Ray Hahnfeldt, Roy Hahnfeldt, Steve Noonan
- Executive producer – Prince (as Paisley Park)
- Guitar – Keith "KC" Cohen
- Hair stylist – John Keoni
- Keyboards – Keith "KC" Cohen, Joseph Markowitz, George Black
- Make-up – Kasha Breuning
- Mastering – Brian Gardner, Steve Noonan
- Mixing – Keith "KC" Cohen, Mark Forrester, Tom Garneau, Kirky J., Rob Paustian, Junior Vasquez, Sylvia Massy, Steve Noonan
- Mixing assistants – Airiq Anest, Dave Aron, Sylvia Massy
- Photography – Lynn Goldsmith
- Producing – Keith "KC" Cohen, Junior Vasquez
- Producing assistants – Airiq Anest, Dave Aron, Sylvia Massy, Junior Vasquez
- Rapping – Karen "K-Dean" Cover, Tony M.
- Scratching – Brian "B-Quick" Crisp
- Vocals – Carmen Electra, Tony M.
