= Vanessa Harris =

American judge

- Born: Washington, Louisiana, U.S.
- Other name: Vanessa Harris-Kennerson
- Education: Southern University (BS); Southern University Law Center (JD)
- Occupations: Lawyer, judge
- Children: 3
- Father: Aaron Harris

Vanessa Harris is an American lawyer and judge serving as judge pro tempore of the Lafayette City Court. She was the first woman and African-American Opelousas City Court Judge. Harris was an assistant district attorney in St. Landry Parish, Louisiana from 1988 to 2008.

== Early life and education ==
Harris is from Washington, Louisiana. Her father, Aaron Harris, is a lawyer. Alonzo Harris is her brother.

She earned a B.S. in computer science at Southern University in 1985. She completed a J.D. at Southern University Law Center in 1988.

== Career ==
Harris worked at the Harris & Harris Law Firm with her father, Aaron Harris since 1988. She was an assistant district attorney in St. Landry Parish, Louisiana from 1988 to 2008. Harris prosecuted juvenile cases and worked on civil cases like school truancies.

Harris was elected on January 1, 2009 to serve on the Opelousas City Court. She is the first woman and African American to serve on that court. She retired in December 2020. In December 2021, Harris was appointed by the Louisiana Supreme Court to serve as judge pro tempore of the Lafayette City Court from December 17, 2021 through February 28, 2022. She replaces Michelle Odinet. Harris is the first African-American judge appointed to the Lafayette City Court.

== Personal life ==
Harris was married to Howard Kennerson. She is married to Senic M. Batiste. She has three daughters.
