= Carmen Electra =

American actress and model (born 1972)

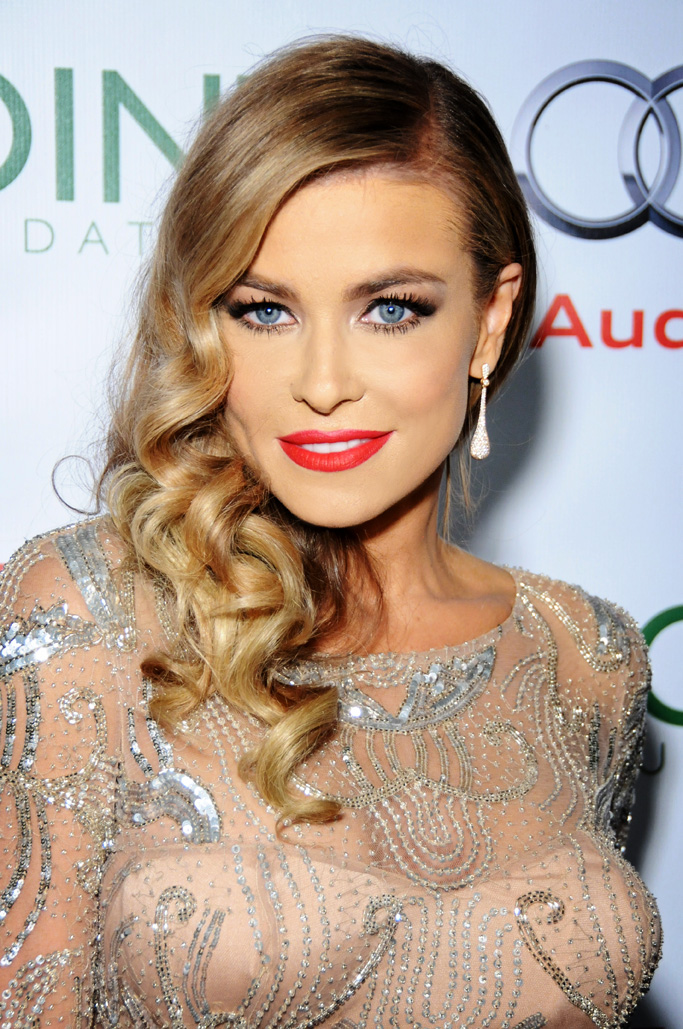
- Electra in 2013
- Born: Tara Leigh Patrick; April 20, 1972 (age 54); Sharonville, Ohio, U.S.
- Education: Barbizon Modeling and Acting School
- Occupations: Actress; model; media personality; singer
- Years active: 1990–present
- Height: 5 ft 4 in (163 cm)
- Spouses: Dennis Rodman (m. 1998; ann. 1999) Dave Navarro (m. 2003; div. 2007)
- Partner: Rob Patterson (2008–2012)
- Musical career
- Genres: Hip hop; pop
- Instrument: Vocals
- Labels: Paisley Park; Warner Bros.

Carmen Electra (born Tara Leigh Patrick; April 20, 1972) is an American actress, model, media personality, and singer. Known for her public image, she has been regarded as a sex symbol and pop culture icon since the late 1990s.

Born and raised in Ohio, Electra began her career as a singer after moving to Minneapolis, where she was discovered by musician Prince who produced her self-titled debut studio album (1993). She began modelling in 1996 with appearances in several issues of Playboy magazine, before relocating to Los Angeles, where she had her breakthrough portraying Lani McKenzie in the drama series Baywatch (1997–1998).

Electra later achieved further recognition for her work in parody films, including Scary Movie (2000), Scary Movie 4, Date Movie (both 2006), Epic Movie (2007), Meet the Spartans, Disaster Movie (both 2008), and Scary Movie (2026). Her other film credits include Get Over It (2001), Starsky & Hutch (2004), Cheaper by the Dozen 2, Dirty Love (both 2005), and I Want Candy (2007). On television, she hosted the MTV dating show Singled Out (1998) and co-starred with her then-husband Dave Navarro on the MTV reality series 'Til Death Do Us Part: Carmen and Dave (2004).

Aside from her entertainment career, Electra has authored books, launched fitness and beauty-related ventures, and appeared in various advertising campaigns. She has also occasionally worked as a dancer, most notably with The Pussycat Dolls, as a featured guest of the group on the VH1 Divas 2004 concert.

== Early life and education ==
Electra was born Tara Leigh Patrick on April 20, 1972, in Sharonville, Ohio (a Cincinnati suburb), to Harry Patrick, a guitarist and entertainer, and his wife Patricia (d. 1998), a singer. Electra attended Ann Weigel Elementary School and studied dance under Gloria J. Simpson at Dance Artists studio in Western Hills until age nine, when she enrolled in the School for Creative and Performing Arts (SCPA), a magnet arts school in the Cincinnati Public School District. There, she was an older classmate of Nick Lachey, with whom she appeared in a production of Peter Pan.

Electra, who told People in 1997 that she had "wanted to dance on Broadway", graduated from Princeton High School in Sharonville in 1990, having transferred there from SCPA two years prior. Additionally, Electra attended and graduated from Barbizon Modeling and Acting School in Cincinnati.

Electra is of Cherokee, German, and Irish descent, and was very close to her family. She said of her mother, "My mom was my rock", and described her older sister Debbie as being "like a second mother to me". After Debbie moved to Illinois, Electra said her life "revolved around my mom. She was my best friend, in my life 24/7 whether I wanted her there or not."

== Career ==
Electra started her professional career in 1990 as a dancer at Kings Island in Mason, Ohio, performing in the show "It's Magic", one of the more popular shows in the park's history. In 1991, she moved to Minneapolis, Minnesota, where she met singer and songwriter Prince. Soon after, Electra signed a recording contract with Prince's Paisley Park Records and made her singing debut with her self-titled debut studio album in 1993, and would be her only album release. During her time at Paisley Park Records, she officially became known as Carmen Electra.

In May 1996, she was featured in a nude pictorial in Playboy magazine, the first of several. Electra was featured in Playboy four more times: June 1997, December 2000, April 2003, and the January 2009 anniversary issue. She was on the cover of the last three of these issues.

Electra moved to Los Angeles, where she made her acting debut in the independent comedy horror film American Vampire (1997). In 1997 she was cast as Lani McKenzie in the American drama series Baywatch, for which she achieved her breakthrough. The role lasted a year and helped to establish her as a sex symbol, which has lasted since the late 1990s and the 2000s. In the same year, she began hosting MTV's Singled Out.

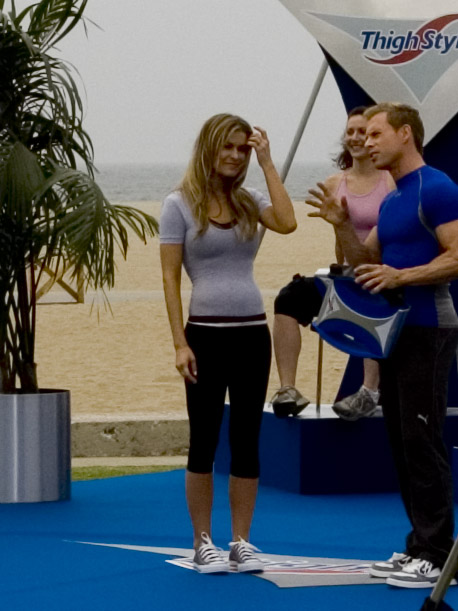
Electra doing an infomercial for the "Thigh Styler"

In 1999, she appeared in the Bloodhound Gang's music video of "The Inevitable Return of the Great White Dope". That same year she appeared in the film The Mating Habits of the Earthbound Human.

In 2000, Electra starred in the horror-comedy parody film Scary Movie as Drew Decker, a character parodied after Casey Becker from Scream (1996). The film was a commercial success, and spawned the Scary Movie franchise which attained a cult following. She later starred as Holly in Scary Movie 4 (2006), the fourth film in the franchise, which holds the box-office record for the best opening on Easter weekend. Electra reprised the role of Lani McKenzie in the 2003 television film Baywatch: Hawaiian Wedding.

In 2004, she appeared in the remake of the 1970s TV show Starsky & Hutch (2004), which was a commercial success. For the role, she won an MTV Movie Award for Best Kiss. Electra appeared as characters in the video game Def Jam: Fight for New York and as one of the celebrity challenges in the video game ESPN NFL 2K5, both also in 2004.

In 2005, Electra starred in the family comedy film Cheaper by the Dozen 2, which received negative reviews from critics, although it was a moderate box-office success and Electra's performance was praised, with Andrea Gronvall of The Chicago Reader writing that she was "the most winning performer of the bunch". Also in 2005, she appeared in an episode of House in which she portrayed herself as an injured golfer and farmer. That same year, she joined the voice cast of the animated series Tripping the Rift, replacing Gina Gershon as the voice of the android "Six".

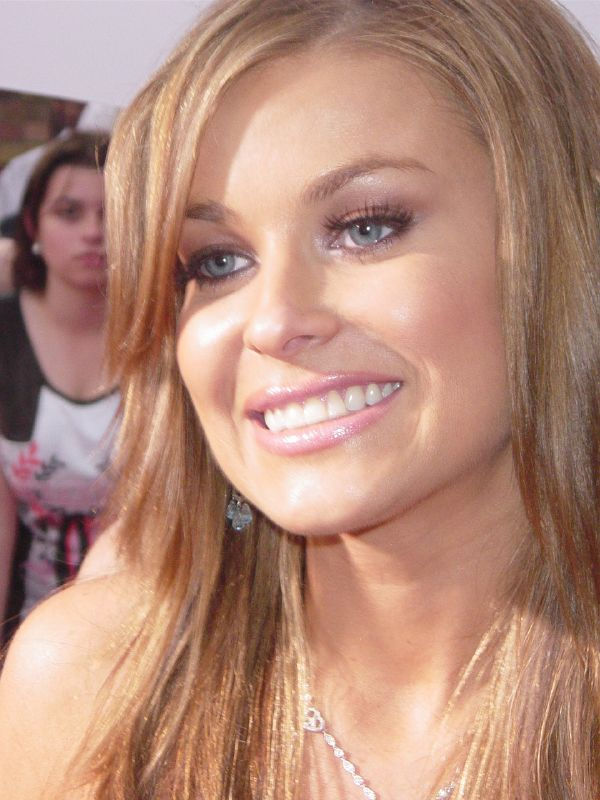
Electra in 2005 at the MTV Movie & TV Awards

In 2006 she appeared in Date Movie. She occasionally performed with The Pussycat Dolls, most notably as a featured guest of the group when they shared the stage with artists like Patti LaBelle and Debbie Harry on VH1 Divas 2004.

In 2007, she became a published author with the release of her book, How to Be Sexy. Electra continued to appear in parody films, most notably Epic Movie in 2007, and Meet the Spartans and Disaster Movie in 2008. She was featured in some video spoofs of lonelygirl15 that advertised Epic Movie. Aside from Epic Movie, all of these films were commercial successes.

Electra appeared as a guest judge on So You Think You Can Dance Season 8 on July 6, 2011. She appeared along with regular series judges Nigel Lythgoe and Mary Murphy and fellow guest judge Travis Wall.

In 2012, Electra joined Britain's Got Talent as a guest judge for the auditions staged in London. She acted as a replacement for Amanda Holden, who was absent due to complications following child birth.

== Public image ==
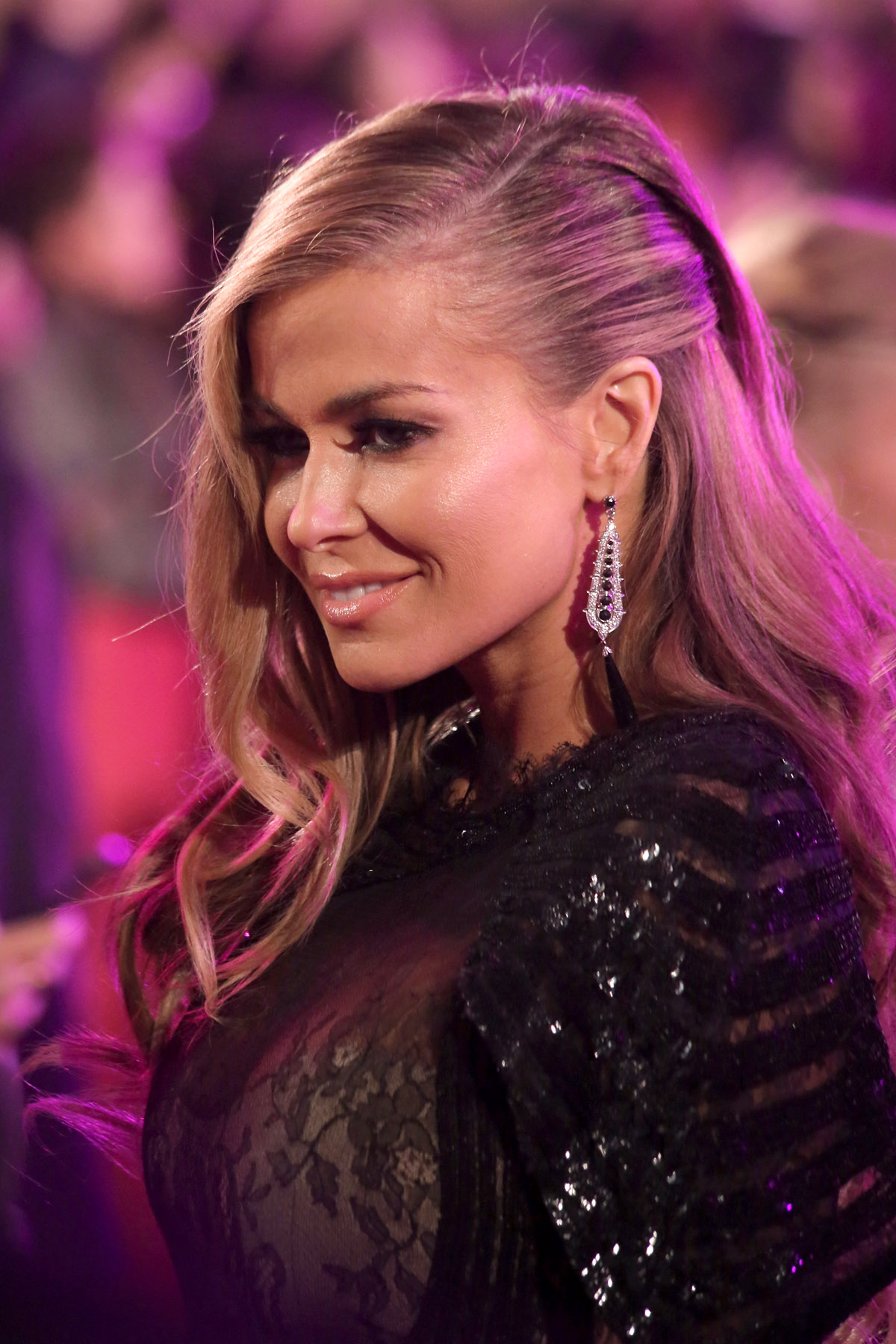
Electra in 2013

Electra is often spotlighted for her looks and has been considered a "sex symbol" and "pop culture icon".

Electra organized a fundraiser for Head to Hollywood, a non-profit organization which offers support to brain tumor survivors. Other charities which she supports include Elevate Hope, a charity which supports abused and abandoned children, and the HollyRod Foundation, which provides medical, physical, and emotional support to those suffering from debilitating life circumstances, especially Parkinson's disease.

She has modeled for the covers of the comic books Razor and the Ladies of London Night by London Night Studios. In 1997, Electra appeared as the face and spokesperson for Max Factor cosmetics in their television and print ads. From 2004 to 2005, she appeared in commercials for Maxim Men's Hair Color products.

In 2002, an extinct species of fly was named Carmenelectra shechisme in honor of Electra's "splendid somal structure".

In 2005, she began the Naked Women's Wrestling League, acting as the commissioner for the professional wrestling promotion. She also frequently appeared in Taco Bell commercials beginning from the same year.

In 2006, Electra signed on as the spokesmodel for Ritz Camera Centers, appearing in their television and print ads with CEO David Ritz. She is the oldest cover girl in the publication history of FHM Magazine.

In 2010, she released a line of sex toys. To promote them, Electra appeared on an episode of the reality television show The Spin Crowd and enlisted the help of Command PR, the public relations firm the program followed.

In 2019, The Golden Banana, a strip club which is located in Peabody, Massachusetts, used Electra's likeness on social media without her consent, which led her, among other celebrities whose likenesses were also used without their permission, to launch a legal battle against the establishment.

In 2020, Electra appeared on the critically acclaimed sports documentary miniseries The Last Dance, where she discussed her short-lived relationship with Dennis Rodman. Pornographic video site Pornhub reported that her name was searched on the site more than 1.7 million times, much more opposed to the 150,000 average searches her name received previously.

In 2022, Electra created an OnlyFans account, stating "I, for once, have this opportunity to be my own boss and have my own creative vision to share with my fans without someone standing over me".

== Personal life ==
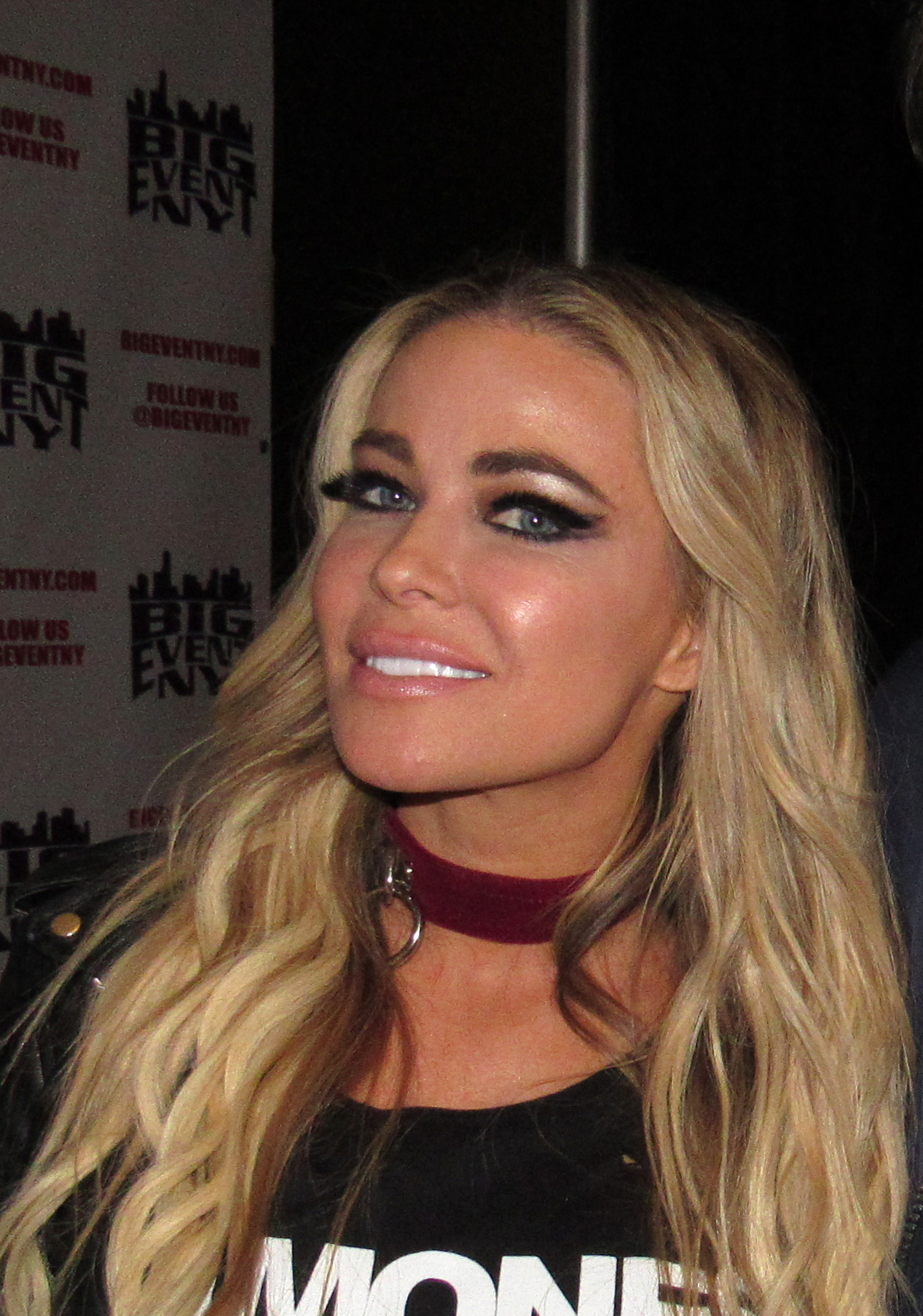
Electra in 2018

In March, 1991 at a Los Angeles nightclub, Electra met musician Prince, who gave her the name Carmen Electra. Soon after, they began a romantic relationship. In 1993, Electra reportedly went on a date with another man, but claims she didn’t get intimate with him. After Prince found out, he recorded the song Eye Hate U about her and played it for her, making her cry.

In August 1998, Electra's mother died of brain cancer, and two weeks later, her older sister, Debbie, died of a heart attack. She credits her committed faith in God and daily prayer as getting her through that difficult time. She told WENN, "I still pray to God every night."

At that time, Electra had been dating NBA sportsman Dennis Rodman. She and Rodman wed in November 1998 at Little Chapel of the Flowers in Las Vegas, Nevada. Nine days later, Rodman filed for annulment, claiming he was of "unsound mind" when the pair wed. Electra explained, "It's easy to get caught up in a moment. You think it's romantic, but then you realize, God, we did it in Vegas? It's like getting a cheeseburger at a fast-food restaurant." The couple reconciled and celebrated New Year's Eve together, but four months later they mutually agreed to end their marriage in April 1999 under "amicable circumstances". In November 1999, Electra and Rodman were arrested for misdemeanor battery after police were notified of a domestic dispute at a Miami Beach hotel. They were released on $2,500 bail each and ordered to stay away from each other. The charges were eventually dropped.

Five years later, Electra gave an interview to Glamour in which she admitted that she married Rodman in 1998 in direct response to the numbing emotional pain of having lost both her mother and sister: "I was just going through the motions. I was completely numb. At the time, I was dating Dennis Rodman. He was such a fun person to be around, and we went out every night. I remember thinking, this is my out. I'm just going to have fun, and I'm not going to worry about anything. Right after my mom and sister died, I flew to Las Vegas and Dennis and I got married. I guess I was trying to cling to whatever I had. I'd lost my mom and my sister; I didn't want to lose anyone else."

On November 22, 2003, Electra married Dave Navarro, lead guitarist for the rock band Jane's Addiction. The couple documented their courtship and marriage in an MTV reality television show called 'Til Death Do Us Part: Carmen and Dave. On July 17, 2006, she and Navarro announced their separation, and Electra filed for divorce on August 10, 2006; it was finalized on February 20, 2007.

In April 2008, Electra's representative confirmed that she was engaged to Rob Patterson, a member of the nu metal band Otep and hard rock band Filter. Despite remaining engaged for several years, the couple did not wed and in 2012, she appeared as one of the celebrity bachelorettes on the TV dating show The Choice.

In February 2024, the Los Angeles Superior Court granted Electra's petition to legally change her name from Tara Leigh Patrick to Carmen Electra.

In February 2026, she spoke with PEOPLE Magazine about her latest tattoo, which reflects her religious devotion. The tattoo shows a pair of praying hands holding onto a Catholic rosary and symbolizes God's protection: "...if I have God's hands on my back, go ahead and try to stab me and see what kind of karma you get."

== Filmography ==
=== Film ===
Year	Title	Role	Notes
1997	Good Burger	Roxanne	Uncredited
1997	American Vampire	Sulka	
1998	Baywatch: White Thunder at Glacier Bay	Lani McKenzie	Direct-to-video
1998	Starstruck	Iona Shirley	
1998	The Chosen One: Legend of the Raven	McKenna Ray / The Raven	Direct-to-video
1998	Welcome to Hollywood	Herself	
1999	The Mating Habits of the Earthbound Human	Jenny Smith	
1999	Vacanze di Natale 2000	Esmeralda	
2000	Scary Movie	Drew Decker	
2001	Sol Goode	Treasure	
2001	Perfume	Simone	
2001	Get Over It	Mistress Moira	
2002	Whacked!	Laura	
2003	Uptown Girls	Celebrity	
2003	My Boss's Daughter	Tina	
2004	Starsky & Hutch	Stacey Haack	
2004	Mr. 3000	Herself	
2004	Max Havoc: Curse of the Dragon	Debbie	Direct-to-video
2005	Lil' Pimp	Honeysack	Voice; direct-to-video
2005	Dirty Love	Michelle Lopez	
2005	Searching for Bobby D	Rebecca	
2005	Cheaper by the Dozen 2	Serena Murtaugh	
2006	Date Movie	Anne	
2006	Scary Movie 4	Holly	
2006	Hot Tamale	Riley	
2006	American Dreamz	Herself	
2006	National Lampoon's Pledge This!	Herself	Direct-to-video
2006	Lolo's Cafe	Desiree	Voice; short film
2007	Epic Movie	Mystique	
2007	Full of It	Herself	
2007	I Want Candy	Candy Fiveways	
2007	Christmas in Wonderland	Ginger Peachum	
2008	Meet the Spartans	Queen Margo	
2008	Disaster Movie	Beautiful Assassin	
2008	Bedtime Stories	Hot Girl	
2009	Oy Vey! My Son Is Gay!!	Sybil Williams	
2010	Barry Munday	Iconic Beauty	
2011	Mardi Gras: Spring Break	Herself	
2014	Hollywood Blvd and Sunset Blvd at Night	Herself	Short film
2014	Dragula	Lisa	Short film
2014	Lap Dance	Lexus	
2015	Chocolate City	Club DJ	
2015	Book of Fire	Theodora	
2023	Good Burger 2	Roxanne	
2026	Scary Movie	Bartender	Uncredited cameo

=== Television ===
Year	Title	Role	Notes
1996	Baywatch Nights	Candy	Episode: "Epilogue"
1996	Erotic Confessions	Manager	Episode: "At the Tone"
1997	Singled Out	Herself	Recurring co-host (season 3)
1997	Loveline	Herself	Co-host; episode: "September 10, 1997"
1997	Rock N' Jock B-Ball Jam	Herself	Host
1997	Mad TV	Herself	Guest host; episode: "Episode #3.2"
1997	Just Shoot Me!	Herself	Episode: "King Lear Jet"
1997	All That	Sue	Episode: "Dru Hill"
1997	Pacific Blue	Lani McKenzie	Episode: "Heartbeat"
1997–1998	Baywatch	Lani McKenzie	Main cast (season 8)
1998	Penn & Teller's Sin City Spectacular	Herself	Episode: "Episode #1.12"
1998	Two Guys and a Girl	Isabella	Episode: "Two Guys, a Girl and a Pizza Delivery"
1998	Soldier of Fortune, Inc.	Tanya	Episode: "Spyder's Web"
1998	Hyperion Bay	Sarah Hicks	Recurring cast
2000	The Drew Carey Show	Herself	Episode: "Drew Live II"
2000–2004	Hollywood Squares	Herself	Recurring panelist
2001	MTV Fashionably Loud: Spring Break, Cancun 2001	Herself	Host
2001	2001 World Music Awards	Herself	Co-host
2001	You Don't Know Jack... About MonsterFest	Herself	Co-host
2001, 2003	Wild On!	Herself	Episodes: "Wild on Spring Break 2001" & "Wild on Hollywood Nights"
2002	Off Centre	Herself	Episode: "Unflushable"
2002	The Simpsons	Herself	Voice; episode: "The Frying Game"
2002	BattleBots	Herself	Host (season 4–5)
2003	Baywatch: Hawaiian Wedding	Lani McKenzie	Television film
2003	Good Day L.A.	Herself	Guest co-host; episode: "March 10, 2003"
2003	Doggy Fizzle Televizzle	Herself	Episode: "Episode #1.6"
2003	Dance Fever	Herself	Judge
2003	King of the Hill	Angela	Voice; episode: "Boxing Luanne"
2003	Greetings from Tucson	Rosa	Episode: "The First Time"
2003	Eve	Zan	Episode: "The Talk"
2004	The Sharon Osbourne Show	Herself	Guest co-host; episode: "February 9, 2004"
2004	'Til Death Do Us Part: Carmen and Dave	Herself	
2004	Punk'd	Herself	Episode: "Episode #3.5"
2004	Manhunt	Herself	Host
2004	Monster Island	Herself	Television film
2004	30 Days Until I'm Famous	Pauline	Television film
2004	Monk	Chloe Blackburn	Episode: "Mr. Monk and the Panic Room"
2004	Method & Red	Kerry Norris	Episode: "Dogs"
2004–2007	Naked Women's Wrestling League	Herself	Main host
2005	Tripping the Rift	Six	Voice; main cast (season 2)
2005	Rent Control	Audrey	Television film
2005	Hope & Faith	Herself	Episode: "Carmen Get It"
2005	American Dad!	Lisa Silver	Voice; episode: "Escape From Pearl Bailey"
2005	Getting Played	Lauren	Television film
2005	Fat Actress	Herself	Episode: "Charlie's Angels"
2005	House	Herself	Episode: "Three Stories"
2005	Summerland	Mona	Recurring cast (season 2)
2005	Stacked	Nikki	Episode: "Darling Nikki"
2005	2005 World Music Awards	Herself	Co-host
2005–2006	Joey	Herself	Guest cast (season 1–2)
2007	Phenomenon	Herself	Episode: "Premiere"
2008	Party Monsters Cabo	Herself	Episode: "Carmen Electra"
2009	Keeping Up with the Kardashians	Herself	Episode: "Kourt's First Cover"
2009	Billboard's New Year's Eve Live	Herself	Host
2009	Reno 911!	Miss Uecker	Episode: "VHS Transfer Memory Lane"
2010	Back Nine	Judy	Television film
2010	The Spin Crowd	Herself	Episode: "Hungry for Love"
2010	Perfect Catch	Herself	Host
2011	RuPaul's Drag Race	Herself	Guest judge; episode: "RuPaul-a-Palooza"
2011	So You Think You Can Dance	Herself	Guest judge; episode: "Top 14 Perform"
2012	Britain's Got Talent	Herself	Guest judge; season 6 auditions
2012	2-Headed Shark Attack	Anne Babish	Television film
2012	90210	Vesta	Episode: "Hate 2 Love" & "902–100"
2012	The Choice	Herself	Episode: "Episode #1.4"
2013	Ridiculousness	Herself	Episode: "Carmen Electra"
2013	What Would Ryan Lochte Do?	Herself	Episode: "What Would Ryan Lochte Do... In Hollywood?"
2013	Suburgatory	Herself	Episode: "Go, Gamblers!"
2014	Joan & Melissa: Joan Knows Best?	Herself	Episode: "Pill Popper"
2014	Sing Your Face Off	Herself	Guest judge; episode: "Episode #1.6"
2014	Franklin & Bash	Bridget Barnes	Episode: "Honor Thy Mother"
2014	The Eric Andre Show	Herself	Episode: "The Hannibal Buress Show"
2014	The Birthday Boys	Myrtle	Episode: "Love Date Hump"
2015	Dance Moms	Herself	Episode: "Episode #5.31" & "#5.33"
2016	Ex Isle	Herself	Host
2016	Hollywood Medium	Herself	Episode: "Omarosa/Ashley Hamilton/RJ Mitte/Carmen Electra"
2016	FABLife	Herself	Guest co-host; episode: "Episode #1.143" & "#1.154"
2016	Jane the Virgin	Herself	Episode: "Chapter Fifty-One"
2017	Worst Cooks in America	Herself	Contestant (season 11)
2018	Whose Line Is It Anyway?	Herself	Episode: "Carmen Electra"
2018	Alone Together	Tia	Episode: "Flashback"
2019	Through the Keyhole	Herself	Episode: "Rob Beckett, Alfie Boe, Lucy Fallon"
2020	The Last Dance	Herself	Episode: "Episode IV & X"
2021	The Celebrity Dating Game	Herself	Episode: "Tyson Beckford and Carmen Electra"
2021	Hell's Kitchen	Herself	Restaurant patron; episode: "Hell Hath No Fury..."
2022	Domino Masters	Herself	Guest host; episode: "Playoffs: Water Worlds"
2024	That '90s Show	Herself	Episode: "Hold My Hand"
2026	Nation's Dumbest	Herself	4 episodes

=== Video games ===
Year	Title	Role	Notes
2004	ESPN NFL 2K5	Herself	
2004	Def Jam: Fight for NY	Herself	
2009	Leisure Suit Larry: Box Office Bust	Ginger Vitus	Voice

=== Music videos ===
Year	Title	Artist
2000	"No Matter What They Say"	Lil' Kim
2000	"The Inevitable Return of the Great White Dope"	Bloodhound Gang
2001	"Girls, Girls, Girls"	Jay-Z
2006	"ACDC"	Joan Jett
2009	"LA Girls"	Mams Taylor
2009	"Hush Hush; Hush Hush"	The Pussycat Dolls
2010	"No Love"	Filter
2015	"Thoughts"	Black Lodge
2025	"SHE DON'T NEED TO KNOW"	The Kid Laroi

=== Documentary ===
Year	Title
1995	Liebe in Hollywood
1997	Playboy: Cheerleaders
1998	Playboy: Celebrities
1999	Hollywood: Wild in the Streets
2001	Playboy Exposed: Playboy Mansion Parties Uncensored
2002	Cleavage
2003	Playboy: Celebrity Photographers
2004	My Date with Drew
2004	G-Phoria
2006	Playboy: Celebrity Centerfolds
2012	Sunset Strip
2013	Out in the Desert
2014	The Ultimate Wedding Planner
2014	Operation Bobbi Bear
2022	Finding Sandler

== Discography ==
=== Studio albums ===
Title	Album details
Carmen Electra	Released: February 9, 1993; Label: Paisley Park Records, Warner Bros. Records

=== Singles ===
Year	Song	Album
1991	"Shhh!"	Non-album single
1992	"Go Go Dancer"	Carmen Electra
1993	"Everybody Get On Up"	Carmen Electra
1993	"Fantasia Erotica"	Carmen Electra
1998	"Fun"	Non-album single
2012	"I Like It Loud"	Non-album single
2013	"Bigger Dick" (feat. Mams Taylor)	Non-album single
2014	"WERQ"	Non-album single
2014	"Around the World"	Non-album single

== Bibliography ==
- How to Be Sexy (2007) (self-help book)

== Awards and nominations ==
Year	Association	Category	Work	Result	Ref.
2004	MTV Movie & TV Awards	Best Kiss	Starsky & Hutch	Won	
2004	MTV Reality Awards	Most Pause Worthy Female	'Til Death Do Us Part: Carmen and Dave	Won	
2005	Golden Raspberry Awards	Worst Supporting Actress	Starsky & Hutch	Nominated	
2006	Golden Raspberry Awards	Worst Supporting Actress	Dirty Love	Nominated	
2007	Golden Raspberry Awards	Worst Supporting Actress	Scary Movie 4 and Date Movie	Won	
2008	Golden Raspberry Awards	Worst Supporting Actress	Epic Movie	Nominated	
2009	Golden Raspberry Awards	Worst Supporting Actress	Meet the Spartans and Disaster Movie	Nominated	
