= Trevor Lissauer =

American actor and musician (born 1973)

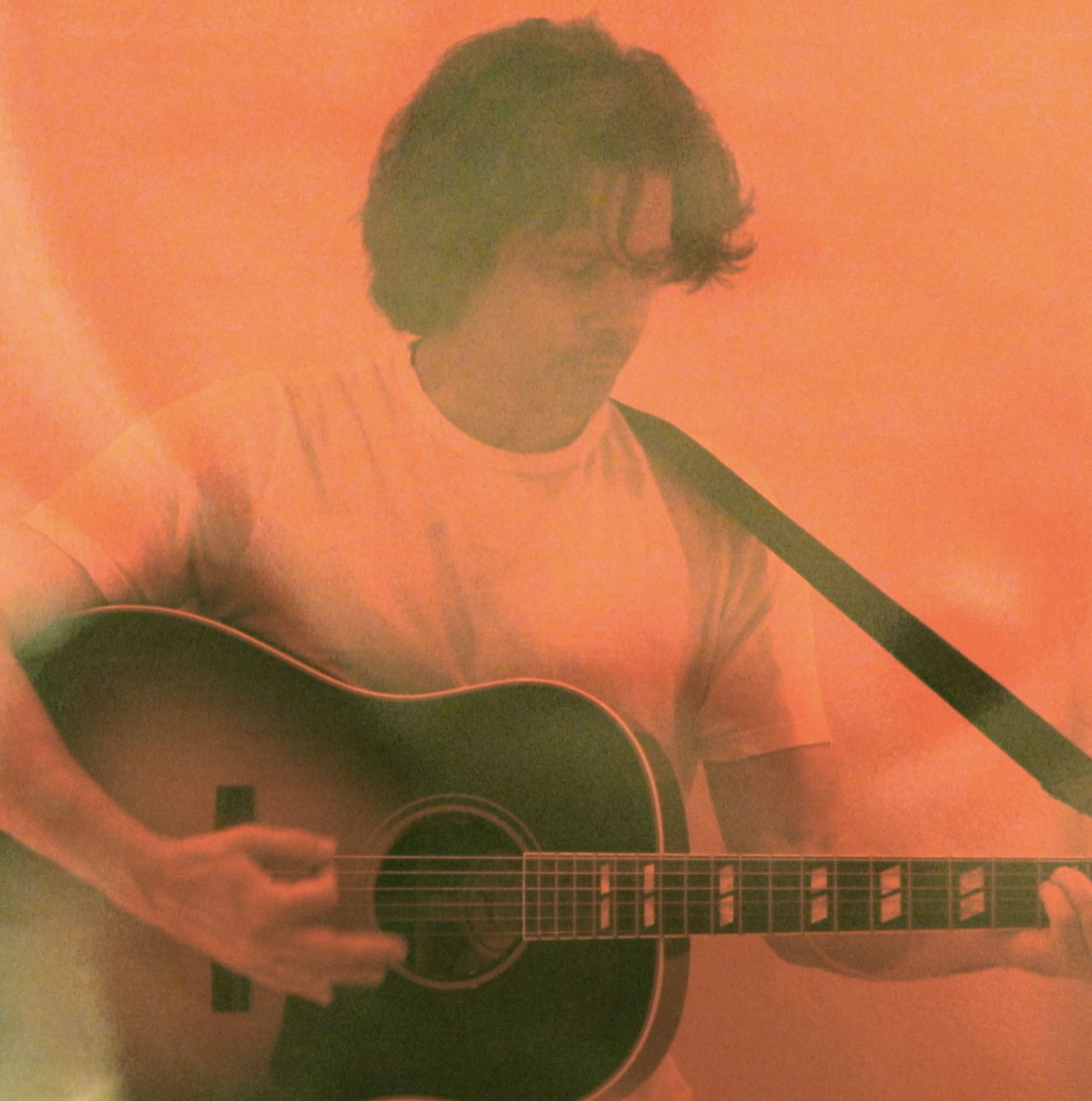
- Trevor Lissauer from his music video for his 2026 release of his song 'Hide Away'.

Background information
- Born: October 29, 1973 (age 52); Dallas, Texas, U.S.
- Genres: Indie Rock
- Occupations: Actor, Singer-Songwriter, Writer
- Instruments: Vocals, Guitar
- Years active: 1992–present
- Website: Official website

Trevor Ryan Lissauer (born October 29, 1973) is an American actor and musician. He is best known for his role as Miles Goodman in Sabrina, the Teenage Witch.

== Career ==
=== Acting ===
Born in Dallas, Texas. Lissauer began his acting career in 1992 by booking his very first audition which was for the Roger Corman film, The Skateboard Kid. He is best known for playing Miles Goodman on Sabrina, the Teenage Witch from 2000 to 2002.

=== Music ===
Lissauer has released two albums on his own to date; his first, self-titled, in 2001, which can only be found as hardcopy CD's and are mostly floating around on eBay. His second album, Transit Plaza, which came out in 2003 and has now been rereleased online as an album by The Glass Plastiks. He decided that the band he was playing with, made up of Keith Tenenbaum and Barry Whittaker, should have a name and titled them The Glass Plastiks which then became the name of the entire music project.

The band went through a few changes. Whittaker left and Dimitrios Farougias took over on bass and Chris Null became the lead guitarist. On July 16, 2008, they released "Time to Exist".

Music from the band has been featured in the TV show Nip/Tuck and the DVD release of both Party of Five and Felicity. In 2012, Lissauer resurfaced with a new music project called Animal Cloud with Glass Plastiks drummer Keith Tenenbaum. Animal Cloud is influenced by bands such as MGMT, Empire Of The Sun, Radiohead, Sigur Ros, and M83.

In 2025, Lissauer released 3 singles as Trevor Lissauer, Get Out Of Your Head, A Chance Of Sunshine, and So Bright, produced by himself and actor/director Billy Wirth. They produced 14 tracks with the rest coming out in 2026.

== Filmography ==
=== Film ===
Year	Title	Role	Notes
1993	The Skateboard Kid	Zack	
1997	An American Vampire Story	Frankie	
1998	Erasable You	Mr. Green	
1999	Clubland	Skater guy	Uncredited
2000	In Memory of My Father	English photographer	
2001	Clay Pride: Being Clay in America	Steve	Short film
2002	Hold On		Short film
2003	Eden's Curve	Joe	
2009	Scream of the Bikini	Elder Zaracay	
2009	American Cowslip	Jim Bob	
2012	From the Head	Russell	
2012	Lionhead	Frank Harrison	
2016	La La Land	Valet	

=== Television ===
Year	Title	Role	Notes
1993	Running the Halls	David Reese	Main role
1994	Lifestories: Families in Crisis	Jeremy Clifton	Episode: "Confronting Brandon: The Intervention of an Addict"
1998	Encore! Encore!		Guest Star
1998	Beyond Belief: Fact or Fiction	Ben	2 episodes
1999	Undressed	Z	Recurring role, 6 episodes
1999	Felicity	Andrew	Episode: "Ancient History"
1999	Roswell	Octavio	Episode: "Heat Wave"
2000–2002	Sabrina, the Teenage Witch	Miles Goodman	Main role (seasons 5–6)
2006	Reno 911!	Henry Junior Jr.	Episode: "The Junior Brothers"
2014	Grumpy Cat's Worst Christmas Ever	Jack the Jack Russell (voice)	TV movie
2017	Nicky, Ricky, Dicky & Dawn	Zach Leben	Episode: "The Great Mullet Caper"
