= Michaela =

- Pronunciation: /mɪˈkeɪlə/
- Gender: Female

Origin
- Origin: Hebrew
- Meaning: Feminine form of Michael, meaning "who is like God"
- Region of origin: Israel and portions of Eastern Europe

Other names
- Short forms: Kay, Kayla, Kiki, Mickey, Kaela, Khaeli, Miki, Mic, Mika
- Related names: Michael; Michelle

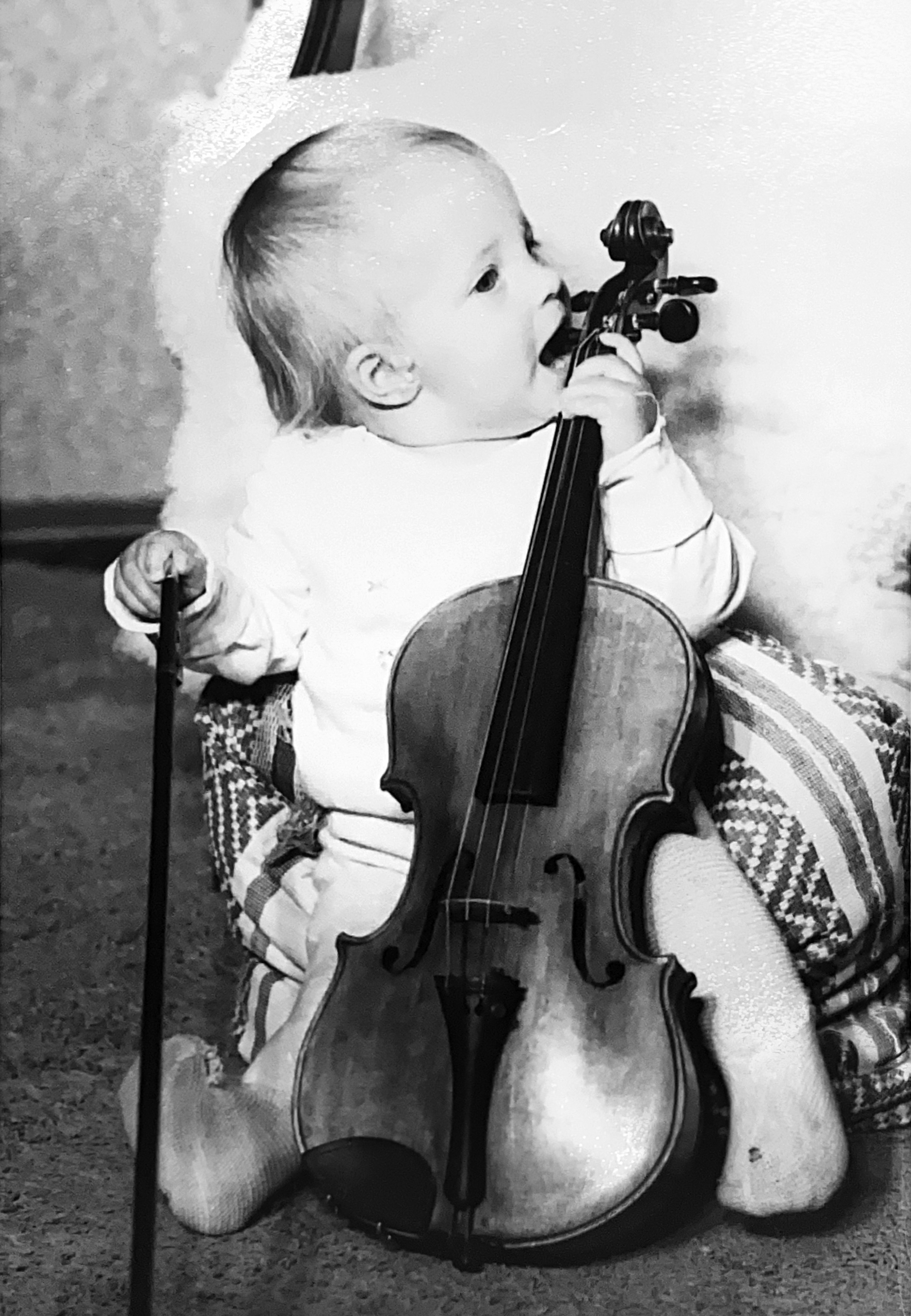
Michaela Modjeska Paetsch with her mouth on the violin pegs, 1962

Michaela (Hebrew מיכאלה) is a female given name. It is a female form of the Hebrew name Michael (מִיכָאֵל), which means "Who is like God".

As of 2008, it was 357th in rank for newborn girls in the United States, and 325th in England and Wales. It is very prevalent in the Czech Republic, ranking at number 9 in January 2002, and number 16 in January 2006.

== Variant forms ==
There are numerous variant spellings. Equivalents in other languages include:

- Makayla (English)
- Meical (Welsh)
- Micaela (Italian, Portuguese, Spanish)
- Michaëla (Dutch)
- Michalina (Polish)
- Michka (Persian)
- Mikayla (English)
- Michaela (Indonesian, English)
- Michajlina (Belarusian)
- Michala (Estonian)
- Micheáilín (Irish)
- Michela (Italian)
- Michèle (French)
- Michelina (Italian)
- Michelle (English, French)
- Micheline (French)
- Miguela (Portuguese, Spanish)
- Miguelina (Spanish)
- Mihaela (Croatian, Romanian)
- Mihaéla (Hungarian)
- Mihaila (Bulgarian)
- Mihajla (Serbian)
- Mikaela (Finnish, Swedish)
- Mikila (Jewish, Serbian, Finnish, Norwegian)
- Mikela (Basque)
- Miķela (Latvian)
- Mikhaela (Bulgarian, Ukrainian)
- Mikhaila (English, Russian)
- Михаела (Bulgarian, Russian)
- Михаела (Bulgarian)
- Mikhaylina (Russian)
- Mikkeline (Danish)
- Mykhaila (Ukrainian)
- Mykhaylyna (Ukrainian)
- ميكيلا (Arabic)
- מיכאלה (Hebrew)
- Μιχαέλα (Greek)
- Միքայելա (Armenian)

== Notable people with this name ==
- Mikaela (1935–1991), Spanish singer and actress
- Michaela Abrhámová (born 1993), Slovak volleyball player
- Mikaela Badinková (born 1979), Slovak actress
- Mikaela Banas (born 1978), New Zealand actress best known for the TV series McLeod's Daughters
- Mikaela Bastidas Puyucahua (1747–1781), martyr for Peruvian Independence
- Michaela Belen (born 2002), Filipina volleyball player
- Michaela Bercu (born 1967), Romanian-Israeli model
- Michaela Blyde (born 1995), New Zealand rugby sevens player
- Michaela Coel (born 1987), British actress, screenwriter, director, producer and singer
- Michaela Conlin (born 1978), American actress in Bones and Yellowstone
- Michaela Denis (1914–2003), British-born film-maker
- Michaela DePrince (1995–2024), Sierra Leonean-American ballet dancer
- Michaela Dietz (born 1982), South Korean-American actress
- Michaela Dorfmeister (born 1973), Austrian skier
- Micaela Martinez DuCasse (1913–1989), American artist, author, and educator
- Michaela Eichwald (born 1967), German painter
- Michaela Garecht (born 1979), American girl who has been missing since 1988
- Mikala Münter Gundersen (born 1968), Danish dressage rider
- Michalina Isaakowa (1880–1937), Polish amateur entomologist
- Micaela Jary (born 1956), German writer
- Mikaela Jenkins (2003), American Paralympic swimmer
- Michaela Kalogerakou (born 1998), Greek water polo player
- Michaela Kargbo (born 1991), track and field athlete in Sierra Leone
- Micaela Kelly (born 1998), American basketball player
- Michaela Kirchgasser (born 1985), Austrian skier
- Michaëlla Krajicek (born 1989), Dutch tennis player, sister of Richard Krajicek
- Mikaela Loach, British climate activist
- Michaela McAreavey (1983–2011), Ulster Rose of Tralee 2004 and daughter of Mickey Harte
- Michaela McManus (born 1983), American actress in Law & Order, SVU
- McKayla Maroney (born 1995), American gymnast
- Michaela McAlonie (born 2001), Scottish footballer
- Michaela Michalopoulou (born 1980), Greek handball player
- Michaela Morkan, Irish camogie player
- Mikaella Moshe (born 2003), Israeli Olympic archer
- Michaela Odone (1939–2000), jointly discovered a treatment for adrenoleukodystrophy (ALD)
- Michaela Paštiková (born 1980), Czech tennis player
- Michaela Pereira (born 1970), CNN news anchor
- Michaela Polleres (born 1997), Olympic medalists in judo
- Mikayla Raines (1995–2025), American animal rescuer, wildlife rehabilitator and YouTuber
- Mikaela Madison Rosberg (Mikey Madison, born 1999), American actress
- Micaela Schäfer (born 1983), German model
- Michaela Schaffrath (born 1970), German television actress
- Mikaela Shiffrin (born 1995), American skier
- MyKayla Skinner (born 1996), American gymnast
- Michaela Strachan (born 1966), British television presenter
- Mikaela Straus (born 1998), American singer and songwriter known by her stage name King Princess
- Michaela Tabb (born 1967), Scottish pool and snooker referee
- Makayla Timpson (born 2002), American basketball player
- Michaela Watkins (born 1971), American actress
- Mikaylah Williams (born 2005), American basketball player

== Name days ==
In Germany, Slovakia and Poland, the name day for Michaela is 24 August and 29 September, in Czech Republic, the name day for Michaela is 19 October and in Hungary for Mihaéla is June 19 and August 24. In Bulgaria the name day for Михаела is 8 November.

== Other uses ==
=== Organizations ===
- Michaela Community School, a school in London

=== Fictional characters ===
- Michaela Quinn, a medical doctor and the title character on Dr. Quinn, Medicine Woman
- Michaela Pratt, a law student on How to Get Away with Murder
- Michaela Stone, a police detective on Manifest (TV series)
- Micaëla, a character in the opera Carmen by Georges Bizet

=== Songs ===
- "Michaela", 1972 German song by Serbian singer Bata Illic
- "Michaela", 1999 German song by Element of Crime
- "Michaela", 2003 Hebrew song by Ron Shuval and Yoav Itzhak
- "Michaela Strachan", 2007 English song by Scouting for Girls
- "Micaela", a 1967 Boogaloo song by Pete Rodriguez
- ”Michaela”, a 2022 song by GRL BUNNY

=== TV ===
- Mikaela, 2004 Israeli television series (מיכאלה)

=== Film ===
- Mikaela (film), 2025 Spanish action thriller film

== Sources ==
- Michaela at "Behind the Name"
- Duden: Lexikon der Vornamen. 2004.
