= American Vampire (film) =

1997 American comedy horror film

- Promotional poster
- Directed by: Luis Esteban
- Written by: Rollin Jarrett
- Produced by: Grant S. Staley
- Starring: Trevor Lissauer; Adam West; Sidney Lassick; Carmen Electra
- Cinematography: Goran Pavicevic
- Music by: Mark Boccaccio
- Production company: Decatur-Staley Productions
- Distributed by: Atmosphere Entertainment
- Release date: 1997
- Running time: 99 minutes
- Country: United States
- Language: English

American Vampire (also known as An American Vampire Story) is a 1997 American independent comedy horror film directed by Luis Esteban, written by Rollin Jarrett, and starring Carmen Electra, Adam West, Sidney Lassick and Trevor Lissauer. Its plot is about a young teenage boy who encounters a female vampire while his parents vacation in Europe.

== Plot ==
Teenager Frankie (Trevor Lissauer), is left in charge of the family home for a few weeks while his parents are vacationing in Europe. After a day of surfing on the beach, Frankie and his best friend Bogie (Danny Hitt) happen upon a group of sexy Bohemian vampires led by Moondoggie (Johnny Venocur) along with his minions Sulka and Katrina (Carmen Electra and Deborah Xavier) and invite them to stay in Frankie's house for a few days in hopes of getting lucky. When Frankie learns that the threesome have some secrets, he enlists the aid of the Big Kahuna, a legendary vampire killer (Adam West) who teaches Frankie how to solve his vampire problems.

== Cast ==
- Trevor Lissauer as Frankie
- Daisy Torme as Dee Dee
- Johnny Venocur as Count Erik Von Zipper / "Moondoggie"
- Sydney Lassick as Bruno
- Carmen Electra as Sulka
- Debra Xavier as Katrina
- Adam West as Ludwig Von Helsingmeister / "The Big Kahuna"
- Danny Hitt as "Bogie"
- Dick Dale as Himself

== Reception ==
The film attained cult-like status with its tongue in cheek humor and its many references to the Beach Party films of Frankie Avalon and Annette Funicello, which were hugely popular in the mid-1960s. An appearance by iconic surf guitar legend Dick Dale performing on the beach adds to the retro vibe of the film.

== Home media ==
The film was released on VHS and DVD on March 20, 2001 by York Home Entertainment. An audio track featuring commentary from comedians from Los Angeles's Groundlings troupe was included. This release featured over-dubbed audio tracks on the actors' performances. It was re-released in 2005 by Digiview Productions in a slim-case package.
