= 'Til Death Do Us Part: Carmen and Dave =

American reality tv series (2004)

- Logo for 'Til Death Do Us Part: Carmen and Dave
- Starring: Carmen Electra; Dave Navarro
- Country of origin: United States
- No. of episodes: 7

Production
- Running time: approximately 20 minutes (per episode)

Original release
- Network: MTV
- Release: 21 January – 3 March 2004

'Til Death Do Us Part: Carmen and Dave (often written 'Til Death Do Us Part: Carmen + Dave or 'Til Death Do Us Part: Carmen & Dave) is a reality television show produced by Fernando Hernández for MTV. It followed the lives of Carmen Electra and Dave Navarro through the events leading up to their anything-but-traditional wedding, culminating with the marriage ceremony and reception. The show first aired on MTV on January 21, 2004, and ran for 7 episodes. The final episode aired on March 3, 2004.

Electra and Navarro married on November 22, 2003. The couple separated on July 18, 2006, and Electra filed for divorce on August 10, 2006. On February 20, 2007, their divorce was finalized.

== Origin ==
Unlike Newlyweds: Nick and Jessica and The Osbournes, 'Til Death Do Us Part: Carmen and Dave concerns only one facet of the subjects' lives: preparations for their wedding. MTV approached Electra and Navarro about producing a wedding series after the couple starred in Carmen and Dave: An MTV Love Story. That series aired in 2002 and documented the couple's courtship. Electra and Navarro, engaged since August 14, 2001, had postponed their wedding, but the show forced them to set a date for their nuptials.

'Til Death Do Us Part: Carmen and Dave on DVD

The show tried to capture the reality of Electra and Navarro's relationship, but according to Navarro, reality TV is an impossibility "because you're not gonna be real with an eight-man crew in your house." He describes the show's product as "the most realistic portrayal of . . . life with eight guys with cameras around."

== Follow-up ==
The stress of making a reality show can be difficult on a marriage, as evidenced by the breakup of Nick Lachey and Jessica Simpson, but it was apparently not the source of trouble for Electra and Navarro. Electra denied the existence of any "MTV curse" and said that the reality shows she did with Navarro were not responsible for their later divorce.

== Cast ==
- Carmen Electra
- Dave Navarro
- Daisy, their pet Yorkshire Terrier (uncredited)

== Episodes ==
The series aired on Wednesday evenings from January 21 to March 3, 2004.

Episode #	Synopsis	Air date
1	Carmen and Dave meet the wedding planner and are overwhelmed by how much they have to do. They have a photo shoot (for the wedding invitations) with David LaChapelle that has the couple stripped naked and posing dead in a morgue. Later, Dave's father and stepmother come over to help plan the big event.	21 January 2004
2	The couple chooses flowers and a cake for their wedding before Dave departs on a European tour with Jane's Addiction and leaves Carmen to continue planning on her own in his absence. Carmen has a fitting for her wedding dress.	28 January 2004
3	Carmen must make decisions regarding the ceremony location, since Dave is still on tour. She chooses her wedding ring at a jewelry store where Madonna shops. Carmen's friends throw her an over-the-top bridal shower, involving a blow-up doll and a midget stripper.	4 February 2004
4	Carmen visits a new location for the wedding. In the evening, Dave returns from Europe. The next day they work on the seating chart for their wedding. Carmen and Dave travel to Las Vegas, where they have a combined bachelor/bachelorette party.	11 February 2004
5	Now only days before the wedding, Carmen and Dave sign their marriage license. Later, Carmen weeps as they listen to their wedding song together. Dave decides to have a physical to get himself in shape for the big day and has the family doctor make a house call. This leads up to the rehearsal dinner, where the bride and groom's families meet for the very first time.	18 February 2004
6	Carmen, who is staying at the hotel where she and Dave are to be married, wakes up on the morning of the wedding and finds that her room has no heat. Dave, back at the house, tries to relax before his nuptials. The hotel staff prepares for the event, and the wedding planner takes care of last minute details. Carmen and her bridesmaids have their hair and make-up done. Dave and the groomsmen get ready for the ceremony to begin.	25 February 2004
7	Carmen and Dave exchange wedding vows in an emotional ceremony, but one of the live parrots in the wedding party "squawks now" instead of holding its peace. At the reception Carmen and Dave go through the traditional cake cutting and bouquet tossing, but in the presence of an interesting mix of guests, including Playmates and celebrities. Dave and his friends go up on stage to play some music. The show ends as Carmen and Dave drive off "into the future."	3 March 2004
