= Michelle Odinet =

American lawyer

- Born: Michelle Marie Miller c. 1968; New Orleans, Louisiana, U.S.
- Education: H. Sophie Newcomb Memorial College; Tulane University Law School
- Occupation: Lawyer
- Political party: Republican
- Children: 4

Michelle Miller Odinet (born c. 1968) is an American lawyer who was elected as a Lafayette, Louisiana City Court Judge in November 2020. Odinet was previously an assistant district attorney in New Orleans and Lafayette and a public defender. She resigned from her judgeship on December 31, 2021, days after a video surfaced of her repeatedly using a racial slur.

== Early life ==
Michelle Marie Miller was born c. 1968 in New Orleans, the daughter of Metairie attorney M.O. Miller II and his wife Diane. The extended Miller family have "deep roots" in New Orleans, and in 1989, Odinet was "crowned Queen of the Hermes Ball." She completed a B.A. at H. Sophie Newcomb Memorial College in 1990 and a J.D. at Tulane University Law School in 1993.

== Career ==
Odinet joined the New Orleans district attorney's office as a prosecutor part time in June 1991. She became a full-time assistant attorney in November 1993. From September to December 1996, Odinet was a part-time worker for the indigent defender program. In December 1996, following the resignation of Robin Rhodes, Mike Harson, the fifteenth judicial district attorney, named Odinet as an assistant district attorney. In this role, she served as a prosecutor of misdemeanors.

Odinet worked at a private law firm where she managed insurance defense cases. Odinet took a break from her career to homeschool her four children. In the fall of 2019, she returned to the Lafayette Parish, Louisiana public defender's office. In 2020, Odinet was elected to a six-year term as Lafayette City Court Judge, Division A. She ran as a Republican and succeeded Francie Bouillion. Odinet won 56 percent (32,104) of the vote to nonpartisan Jules Edwards III's 43 percent (24,237).

== Use of racial slurs ==
In December 2021, Odinet took an unpaid leave of absence following the surfacing of a video of her repeatedly using a racist epithet. Odinet issued a statement that she was on a sedative at the time and had no recollection of the event. The Louisiana Supreme Court appointed Vanessa Harris to replace Odinet from December 17, 2021 through February 28, 2022.

In December 2021, the New Orleans district attorney, Jason Williams, ordered a review of all of Odinet's New Orleans cases by the civil rights division in his office. Odinet resigned from the bench on December 31, 2021.

== Personal life ==
In 1996, Odinet was a resident of Lafayette, Louisiana. She is married to plastic surgeon and otolaryngologist Kenneth Louis Odinet, Jr. Odinet is the son of Kenneth Odinet, Sr., who served as the state representative for St. Bernard Parish in the Louisiana House of Representatives from 1987 to 2007 as a Democrat, though he changed his party affiliation to Republican when he ran for Public Service Commissioner in 2008 and lost. Odinet has four children, two sets of boy/girl twins.
