= Michelle Gooris =

Dutch pilot and YouTuber (born 1991)

- Born: 10 November 1991 (age 34); Bunschoten-Spakenburg, Utrecht, Netherlands
- Occupations: Airline pilot; YouTuber

YouTube information
- Channel: DutchPilotGirl
- Years active: 2014–present
- Genre: Aviation
- Subscribers: 401 thousand
- Views: 38.5 million
- Last updated: 11 August 2025
- Website: michellegooris.com

Michelle Gooris (Dutch pronunciation: [miˈɕɛlə ˈɣoːrɪs]; born 10 November 1991), also known as DutchPilotGirl, is a Dutch pilot and YouTuber.

== Early life and education ==
Michelle Gooris was born on 10 November 1991 in Bunschoten-Spakenburg, in the province of Utrecht, where her parents had moved for work. Her family is originally from Zeeland. During her youth, the family relocated to the nearby town of Nijkerk, where she and her brother, Marc, grew up and completed their secondary education.

Gooris attended secondary school at the VWO level. In her fourth year, she chose the Natuur en Techniek (lit. Nature and Technology) profile, which focuses on the natural sciences and includes subjects such as physics and an advanced mathematics curriculum emphasising algebra, geometry, and calculus. Although she has said in retrospect that this profile was "not the easiest", she selected it due to uncertainty about her future career path and a desire to keep her options open.

Around this time, she began exploring her options by attending open days at various institutions, including law and medical schools, but none piqued her interest. A year later, at the age of 17, her grandfather earned his private pilot licence at 74 and encouraged her to consider aviation. Until then, she had never regarded a piloting career as a realistic option, largely because she believed that boys with early aviation interests were better suited to such paths, likening the idea to “joining the marines”. Despite her initial scepticism, and with no familial or social ties to the aviation industry, she began researching flight schools out of a mix of curiosity and uncertainty.

Ultimately, her visits to these schools convinced her. At age 19, after completing her VWO diploma, and her choice of profile had paid dividends, she enrolled at the Nationale Luchtvaartschool, which formed the Dutch branch of the CAE Oxford Aviation Academy before their complete merger in 2014. After passing the selection process, she commenced an 8-month ground school (theory study) in Amsterdam, near her home, marking the beginning of her pilot training.

== Career ==
She graduated as a pilot in 2013, and she started her YouTube channel under her alias DutchPilotGirl June 2014 gaining hundreds of thousands of subscribers and ten of millions of views over the following decade. Her first videos were of her first solo flights in a Piper PA-28 Cherokee and a Diamond DA40 Diamond Star.

Initially after qualifying she failed to find a job flying and it was two years before she got her first job working for Ryanair as the copilot of a Boeing 737. Before landing a job as a pilot she kept her focus on aviation working as an instructor at a flight simulator. She later moved to a Palma de Mallorca based charter company after around 500 flight hours with Ryanair.

She now encourages people to consider being pilots, but especially women who she says are still under represented in the field. She says that 95% of pilots are male, a statistic that is mirrored in her YouTube viewer demographics. In 2021, India had the highest percentage of female pilots, but that was still just 12%.

As well as her social media used to promote flying Gooris also wrote an ebook called Become an Airline Pilot. She has also created other resources to help people considering this career path, including a mobile app and a website.

Her videos of pilot viewpoints of places attract interest across many countries, from The Connexion reporting on her views of the French Riviera to The Dubrovnik Times on landing at Dubrovnik Airport.

Although she has stated that in her company she has "never experienced overt sexism" some reporting of her, and other female pilots, choose to focus more on her looks than her abilities and flight related content, with some choosing to refer to her as the "World's sexiest airline pilot" or "Instagram's Hottest Female Pilot".
