= Mickey Coffino =

American businesswoman

- Citizenship: American
- Education: University of North Carolina at Charlotte
- Occupation: Businessperson
- Website: mickeycoffino.com

Mickey Coffino is an American serial entrepreneur, workforce development advocate, and founder of multiple businesses.

== Early life and education ==
Coffino was raised in Michigan. She completed a Master's Program in advanced cosmetology and later attended the University of North Carolina at Charlotte (UNCC).

== Career ==
Coffino opened her first salon at age 22 and later worked as a hairstylist in Los Angeles. Coffino founded Queen City Metal Recycling & Salvage, a for-profit recycling company.

In 2025, Coffino launched Generational Health, a behavioral health and crisis facility. Coffino is the founder of ReEnergize, a caffeine-free, sugar-free hydration beverage made with organic ingredients and magnesium.
