= Black Lodge (band) =

- Genres: Industrial rock
- Years active: 2012–present

Black Lodge is an industrial rock band originating from Los Angeles which was formed in 2012 by guitarist Johnny Royal. The band recorded their debut self-titled EP with Jeordie White, Johnny K, Lee Miles, and Sean Beavan. The band released the EP independently on 22 October.

The band toured in support of the album, including dates with Pop Evil. On 24 April 2014, bassist Ventura Sergio Banuelos (Ventura Xiii) was killed in a motorcycle accident in Lincoln Heights, CA.

The band is currently working on a graphic novel with former Marvel Comics artist Wayne Robinson and a new album.
