= Micaela Jary =

German writer (born 1956)

Micaela Jary (born July 29, 1956, in Hamburg) is a German writer. She is the daughter of the composer Michael Jary.

== Life ==
Jary grew up in Hamburg, Munich and Lugano. She studied English and Italian in Munich, completed a traineeship at a major German daily newspaper and worked for many years as an editor, head of department and deputy editor-in-chief for various magazines.

Micaela Jary has been writing books since 1993, writing successful historical novels under the pseudonym Gabriela Galvani, including Die Seidenhändlerin published by Aufbau-Verlag, the novel that won 2nd place in the DeLiA Literature Prize in 2009. Her first novel biography Mademoiselle Coco und der Duft der Liebe was published in 2018 under the pseudonym Michelle Marly. She lived in Paris for many years and now lives in Munich and Berlin. She is married and has a grown-up daughter.

She is a full member of GEMA and the authors' group for German-language crime fiction – Das Syndikat as well as the association of German romance authors DeLiA and the authors' group HOMER. From 2011 to 2012 she was a jury member for the DeLiA Literature Prize, in 2012 she was on the jury for the Putlitz Prize and in 2013 on the jury for the historical crime novel genre for the HOMER Literature Prize.

In the 2020s she wrote the Parlamentarierinnen series under the pseudonym Micaela A. Gabriel, which was published by Rowohlt Verlag. The three volumes in the form of a historical novel are about the lives of the first women in the German Reichstag.

== Works ==
- Das Kino am Jungfernstieg – Der Filmpalast. Munich 2021, ISBN 978-3-442-48847-6
- Das Kino am Jungfernstieg. Goldmann, Munich 2019, ISBN 978-3-442-48848-3
- Madame Piaf und das Lied der Liebe. Aufbau Taschenbuch, Berlin 2019, ISBN 978-3-7466-3481-4
- Der Gutshof im Alten Land. Goldmann, Munich 2018, ISBN 978-3-442-48596-3.
- Sterne über der Alster. Piper, Munich 2015, ISBN 978-3-492-30697-3.
- Das Haus am Alsterufer. TB Goldmann, Munich 2014, ISBN 978-3-442-48028-9.
- Das Bild der Erinnerung. Club Bertelsmann, Rheda 2013. (Goldmann, Munich 2013, ISBN 978-3-442-47885-9)
- Die Bucht des blauen Feuers. TB Goldmann, Munich 2012, ISBN 978-3-442-47714-2.
- Sehnsucht nach Sansibar. Historical novel. Goldmann, Munich 2012, ISBN 978-3-442-47666-4.
- A chapter in the joint work Autorenkreis Historischer Roman Quo Vadis: Das dritte Schwert. Aufbau, Berlin 2008, ISBN 978-3-7466-2403-7.
- Die geheime Königin. Historical novel. Aufbau, Berlin 2007, ISBN 978-3-7466-2292-7.
- Stay with us, Salima. Children's book. Schneider, Munich 1993, ISBN 3-505-04901-8.
- Charleston & Vincent van Gogh. Historical novel. Ullstein, Munich 2001, ISBN 3-548-24976-0.
- Die Figuren des Goldmachers. Historical novel. Bastei Lübbe, Bergisch Gladbach 1998, ISBN 3-404-12676-9.
- "I know, a miracle will happen one day". The life of Zarah Leander. Aufbau, Berlin 2001, ISBN 3-7466-1751-0.
- Die Pastellkönigin. Historical novel. Droemer, Munich 2005, ISBN 3-426-19670-0.
- Traumfabriken "Made in Germany". The history of the German post-war film 1945–1960. Edition Q, Berlin 1993, ISBN 3-86124-235-4.
