= Michelle Ongkingco =

American actress (born 1978)

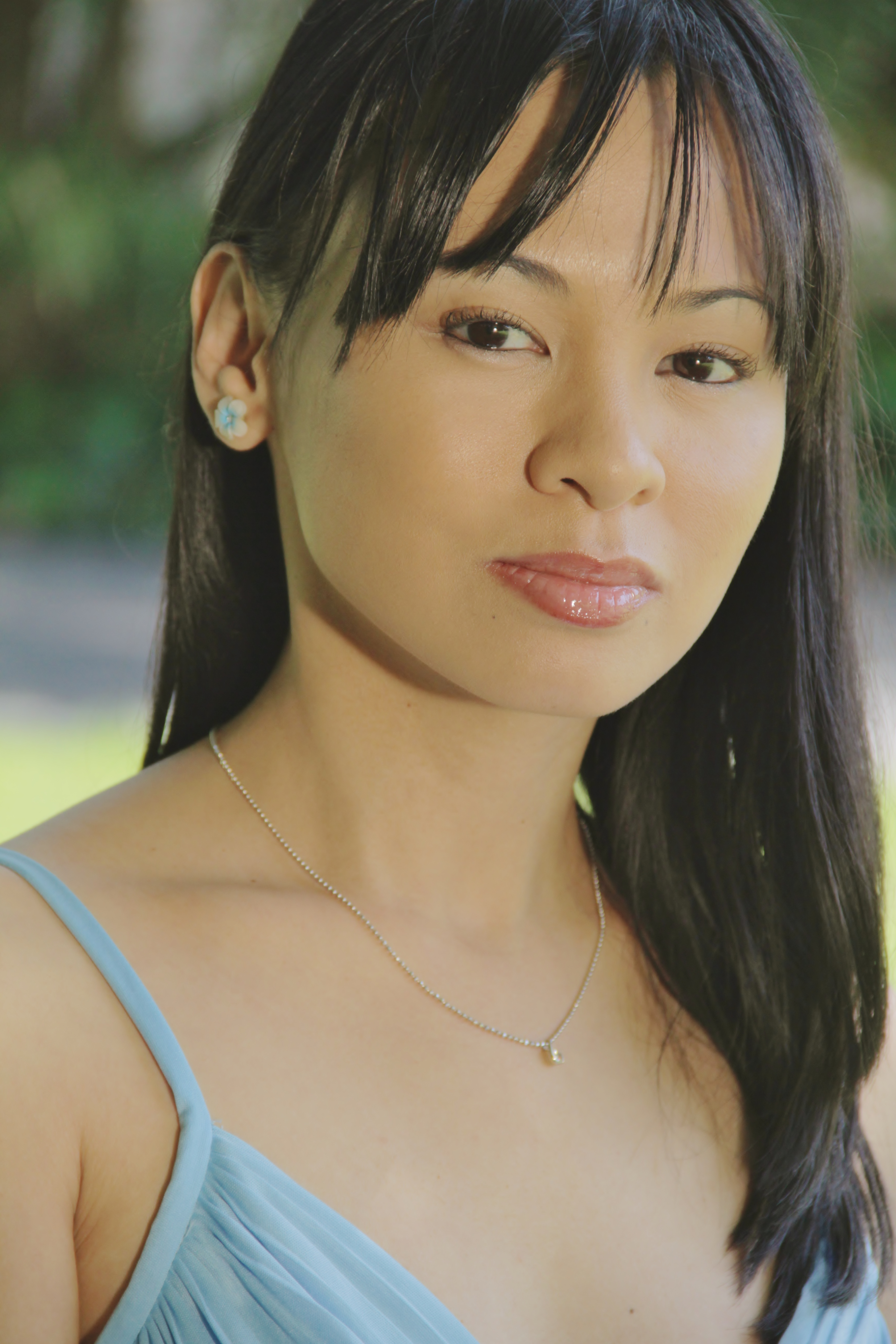
- Born: March 4, 1978 (age 48); Brooklyn, New York, United States
- Occupation: Actress
- Years active: 1993–present
- Website: Official page on Facebook

Michelle Ongkingco (born March 4, 1978) is an American actress, best known for her recurring role as Olivia in Gilmore Girls.

== Life and work ==
Ongkingco first appeared in an episode of the US comedy series Kelly Kelly in 1998, and in the US television series Beverly Hills, 90210 in 1999, followed by other guest roles in Boston Public, Kate Basher, Hollywood 7, Judging Amy, Grey's Anatomy, The O.C., Brothers & Sisters and Ghost Whisperer. She also played Trudi in eight episodes of the fourth season of the American anthology series Undressed. Ongkingo also appeared in This is How the World Ends, a 2000 television film, and in the 2009 comedy Mrs. Washington Goes to Smith alongside Cybill Shepherd. Her probably best known role is the recurring character Olivia in the seventh season of the US comedy series Gilmore Girls in 2006 and 2007.

Ongkingco also appeared in L.A. Theatre Works's 2008 play Boats on a River by Julie Marie Myatt.

== Filmography ==
=== Television ===
Year	Title	Role	Notes
1995–96	Guiding Light	Erin	Recurring role (9 episodes)
1998	Kelly Kelly	Mindy	"Doodler"
1999	Beverly Hills, 90210	Cindy	"Withdrawal"
2000	Boston Public	Ms. Harris	"Chapter 3"
2000	This Is How the World Ends	Magenta	TV film
2001	Undressed	Trudi	Main role (season 4)
2001	Kate Brasher	Mia	"Jeff"
2001	Hollywood 7	Cute Girl	"The Kiss"
2004	Judging Amy	Marissa	"Roadhouse Blues"
2005	Grey's Anatomy	Nicole Verma	"Something to Talk About"
2006	The O.C.	Amber	"The Gringos", "The Sleeping Beauty"
2006–07	Gilmore Girls	Olivia	Recurring role (7 episodes)
2007	Ghost Whisperer	Gina Platt	"Mean Ghost"
2008	Brothers & Sisters	Dawn McCarthy	"Everything Must Go"
2009	Mrs. Washington Goes to Smith	Christina	TV film
2016	Blindspot	Nanny	"Scientists Hollow Fortune"
