= Rose Freymuth-Frazier =

American artist (born 1977)

- Born: 1977 (age 47–48); Nevada City, California
- Citizenship: United States, Germany
- Known for: Figurative painting

Rose Freymuth-Frazier (born 1977) is an American figurative painter.

== Biography ==
Rose Freymuth-Frazier was born 1977, in Nevada City, California. She lives and works in New York City. As a descendant of a Jewish refugee fleeing Nazi persecution in Germany, she acquired German citizenship in 2023.

== Painting ==
Freymuth-Frazier is known for her rigorously rendered portraits of the contemporary female experience as well as paintings of disposable objects such as breast-pumps, balloons and expensive shoes. Her work has received attention from publications including Art Papers, ARTnews, The Chicago Tribune, Direct Art Magazine and American Art Collector Magazine. Freymuth-Frazier studied with and was assistant to Steven Assael in New York City and Odd Nerdrum in Norway.

Freymuth-Frazier's work was included in the third annual The Cat Art Show in 2018. In 2022, Freymuth-Frazier held a solo exhibit, "Inner Spaces," at Stone Sparrow NYC.
