= Michelle Valberg =

Canadian wildlife and nature photographer

Michelle Valberg CM
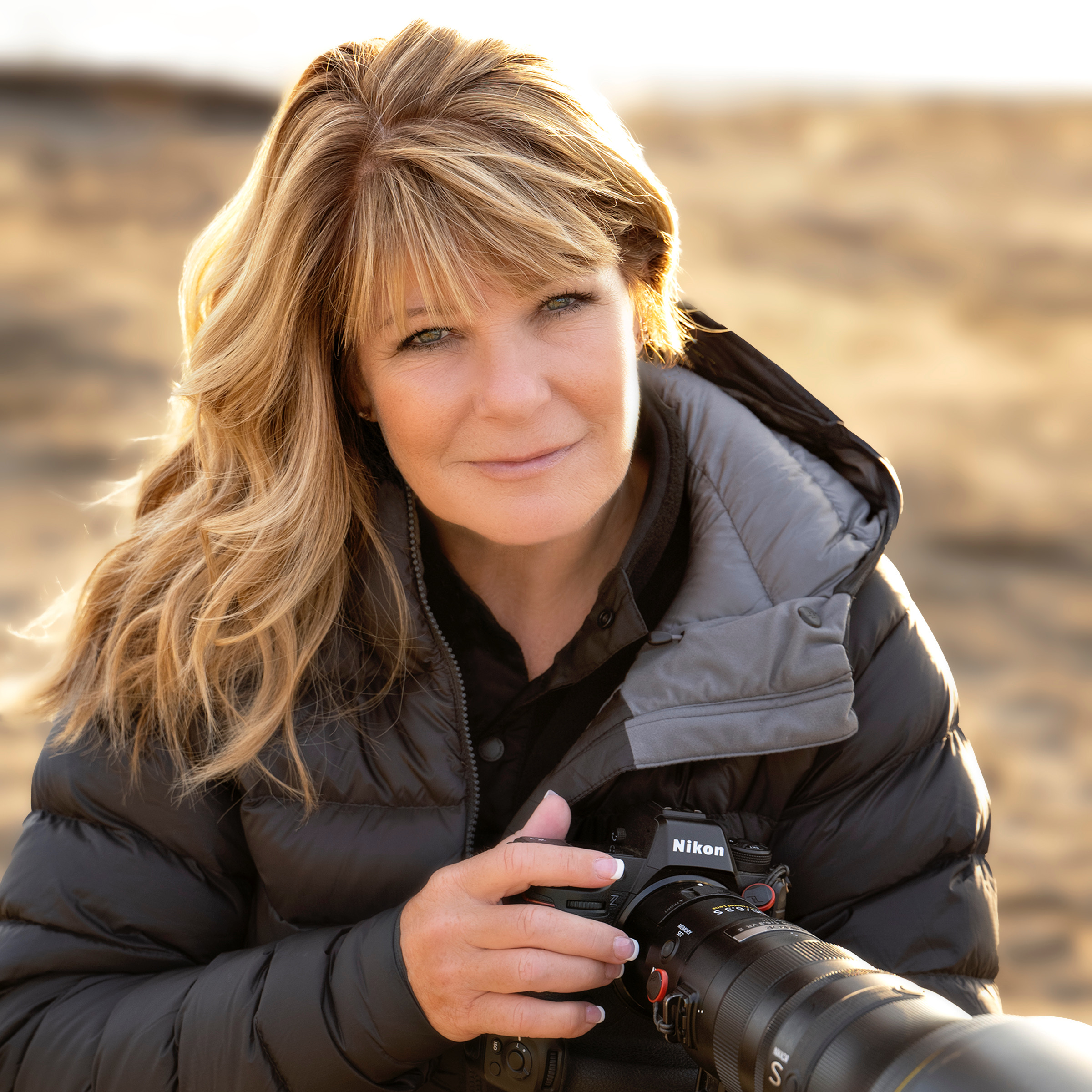
- Michelle Valberg in 2023
- Born: Ottawa, Ontario, Canada
- Education: University of Ottawa, Algonquin College
- Occupation: Photographer
- Known for: Nature and wildlife photography
- Spouse: Scott MacLennan (m. 2000)
- Children: 1
- Website: www.michellevalberg.com

Michelle Valberg CM is a Canadian nature and wildlife photographer who has documented Canada's landscapes and wildlife, especially the Arctic. In 2022, she was appointed a Member of the Order of Canada for her contributions in photography and philanthropy, particularly in raising awareness of Canada's North.

Valberg's photographs have been used on Canada Post stamps and a coin from the Royal Canadian Mint. She has received the Louie Kamookak Medal from the Royal Canadian Geographic Society, Gold Medal for wildlife from World Photographic Cup, and the Julia Margaret Cameron Award for Women Photographers from The Worldwide Photography Gala Awards.

== Early life and education ==
Michelle Valberg was born and raised in Ottawa, Ontario, Canada. She was influenced by the work of photographers in National Geographic.

She studied fine art/photography at the University of Ottawa, and later, photography at Algonquin College.

== Career ==
Valberg is involved in wildlife and landscape photography, particularly in the Canadian Arctic.

In 2017, she was involved in the Canada C3 expedition for Canada's 150th anniversary, organized by Students on Ice. She was a part of Leg 8 of the journey, aboard the former Canadian Coast Guard icebreaker, Polar Prince. The expedition traveled from Qikiqtarjuaq to Pond Inlet, focusing on the impact of climate change, community engagement, and reconciliation. She documented the expedition, its delivery of sports equipment to northern communities, and environmental changes.

Valberg participated in InFocus Canada's Athena Collection, turning wildlife photographs into wearable art. Photographs were printed on fabric made from recycled plastic bottles, to raise awareness and funds for conservation charities. Her contribution was directed towards Raincoast Conservation and The Nature Foundation at the Canadian Museum of Nature. During the COVID-19 pandemic, Valberg started Planet Hope, a photography project capturing the impact of the health crisis on individuals. Planet Hope consists of black and white portraits of people affected by the pandemic, conveying hope and solidarity.

She is a supporter and member of the event committee for the Jane Goodall Institute of Canada. She provides photos and film footage for the institute's Canadian content and has organized a benefit to raise funds for the institute.

=== Project North ===
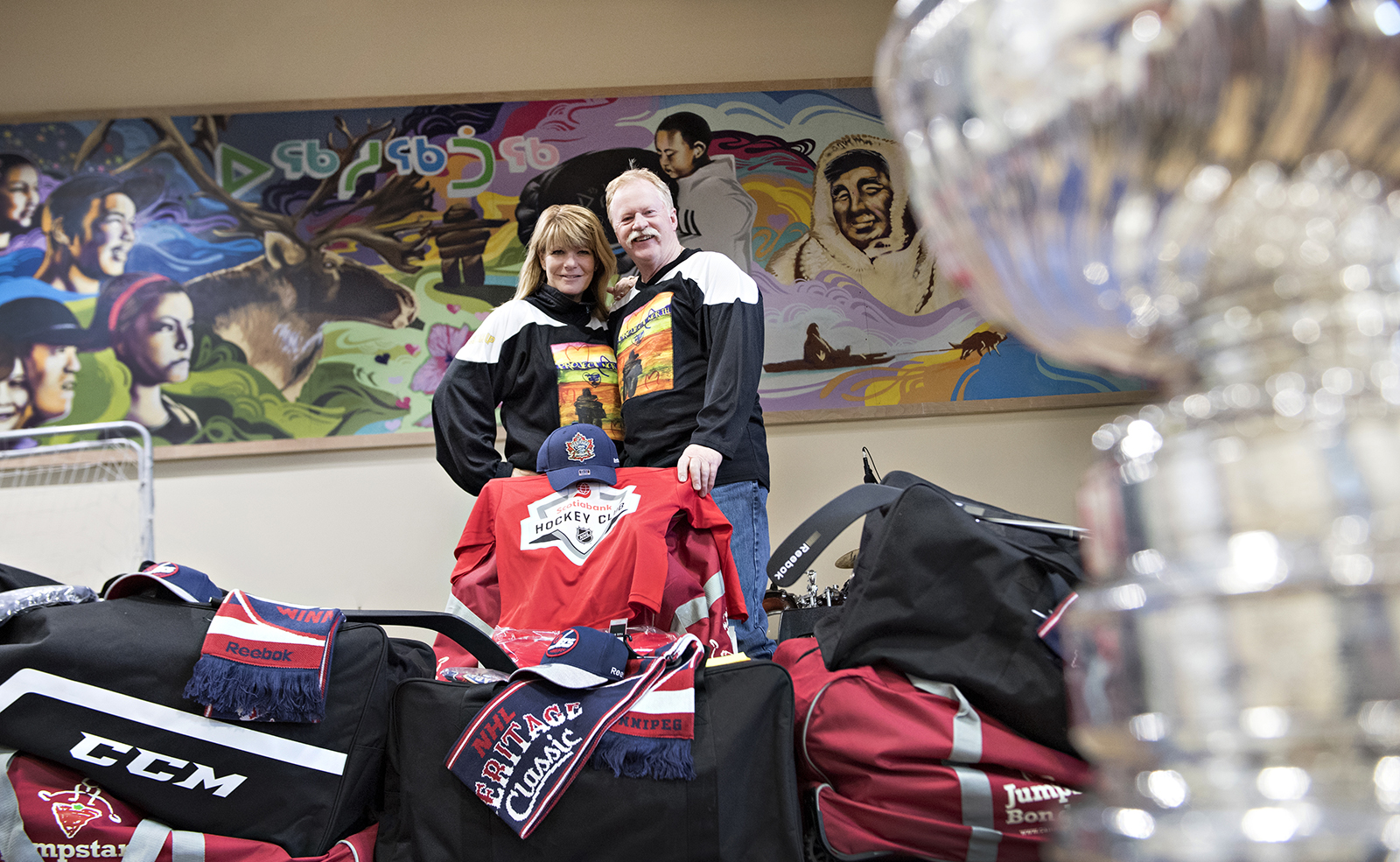
Valberg and Jeff Turner with the Stanley Cup.

In 2009, Valberg founded Project North, a not-for-profit aiming to enrich the lives of youth in the arctic. The organization provides educational and fitness programs, including donating sports equipment to remote northern communities. It has delivered more than $1 million worth of new hockey equipment and educational opportunities to thousands of children across the Arctic regions of Canada.

Project North has partnered with Scotiabank and the National Hockey League to bring the Stanley Cup across the Northwest Territories, Nunavut, Nunavik and Baffin Island.

== Personal life ==
Valberg lives in Ottawa, Ontario, and has a cottage on Sharbot Lake. She is married to Scott MacLennan and they have a son.

== Group exhibitions ==
- This is Canada's Arctic, Canadian Museum of Nature, Ottawa, Ontario, 2011. Included Valberg's Arctic images.
- Nature is Calling, Scotiabank Contact Photography Festival, Toronto, Ontario, 2018. Included Valberg's Arctic Images.
- Wolves: Shape Shifters in a Changing World, Canadian Museum of Nature, Ottawa, Ontario, 2023. Included Valberg's images of wolves.

== Publications ==
- Look Beyond – the faces and stories of people with HIV/AIDS (1996)
- Dare to Dream: a celebration of Canadian Women (2000)
- Ben and Nuki Discover Polar Bears (2012)
- Arctic Kaleidoscope: the People, Wildlife, and Ever-Changing Landscape (2013)

== Awards ==
- 2017: United Way Community Builder of the Year Ambassador Award
- 2018: Royal Canadian Geographic Society Louie Kamookak Medal
- 2021: California Academy of Sciences' BigPicture Natural World Photography Competition for her Spirit Bear photo "Boss"
- 2021: Julia Margaret Cameron Award for Women Photographers from The Worldwide Photography Gala Awards
- 2022: Appointed a Member of the Order of Canada for her photography and contributions to raising awareness about the Arctic
- 2022: Gold Medal for wildlife from World Photographic Cup
