= Michelle Madhok =

American businesswoman

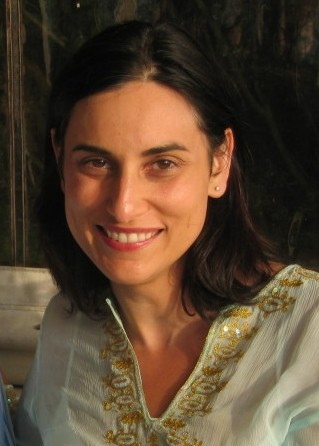
- Michelle Madhok in East Hampton, Sept 2006
- Born: Michelle N. Madhok; May 26, 1971 (age 54); California
- Education: University of California, Berkeley (BS); Northwestern University (MS)
- Occupation: Internet journalist
- Title: CEO SheFinds.com
- Spouse: Michael Palka
- Website: http://michellemadhok.com

Michelle Madhok (born May 26, 1971) is the Founder and CEO of White Cat Media Inc. - DBA SheFinds Media, parent company of online shopping publication SheFinds.com and MomFinds.com. She writes a weekly style column for New York's Metro newspaper and appears regularly on Fox News Channel, The Today Show and The Tyra Banks Show. Michelle is a frequent speaker at internet, affiliate marketing and blogging industry conferences. She has written about dating tips for single celebrities at Yahoo Personals.

Prior to founding the website SheFinds.com, Madhok served as group director of editorial products for women at AOL.

She was educated at University of California, Berkeley, achieving a BS in Communications and an MS in Marketing from Northwestern University.

On September 10, 2005 Michelle married entrepreneur and internet maven Michael Palka whom she met via Match.com. They live on the west side of Manhattan.
