= The Hostage Tower =

1980 American television film

- Written by: Robert Carrington
- Directed by: Claudio Guzmán
- Starring: Peter Fonda; Douglas Fairbanks Jr.
- Music by: John Scott
- Country of origin: United States
- Original language: English

Production
- Executive producers: Jerry Leider; Peter Snell
- Producer: Burt Nodella
- Cinematography: Jean Boffety
- Editor: Ronald J. Fagan
- Running time: 105 minutes
- Production company: Jerry Leider Productions
- Budget: USD 4 million or USD 5 million

Original release
- Release: May 13, 1980

The Hostage Tower is a 1980 American spy and thriller television film starring Peter Fonda and Douglas Fairbanks Jr., and directed by Claudio Guzmán, well known for his work in sitcoms. It is based on a story by Alistair MacLean. A book based on MacLean's story by John Denis was the first in the series of UNACO books.

== Plot ==
Criminal mastermind Mr. Smith (Keir Dullea) is being pursued by Malcolm Philpott (Douglas Fairbanks Jr.), the head of an international peace organization.

Smith draws together a team for a heist including weapons expert Mike Graham (ex-CIA) and thieves Sabrina and Clarence. Sabrina and Clarence secretly work for Philpott.

When Mr. Smith captures the Eiffel Tower and kidnaps the mother of the President of the United States (Celia Johnson), Philpott must enlist the help of spies to take him down.

Mr. Smith demands a ransom of $30 million without which he will blow up the tower and the President's mother. He has protected the tower from infiltration by stealing four high-power lasers which will shoot anyone entering who is not equipped with a protective device.

== Cast ==
- Peter Fonda as Mike Graham
- Douglas Fairbanks Jr. as Malcolm Philpott
- Maud Adams as Sabrina Carver
- Billy Dee Williams as Clarence Whitlock
- Keir Dullea as Mr. Smith
- Britt Ekland as Leah
- Rachel Roberts as Sonya Kolchinski
- Celia Johnson as Mrs Wheeler

== Production ==
In the early 1970s, a series of films based on MacLean novels had not performed well at the American box office, including When Eight Bells Toll, Puppet on a Chain and Fear Is the Key. MacLean decided to focus on American television, collaborating with producers Peter Snell and Jerry Leider.

In 1977 Leider and Snell suggested MacLean write some story ideas for a series. The author prepared eight outlines which dealt with the activities of a crime fighting group, the United Nations Anti-Crime Organization (UNACO).

He wrote a 120 page novella called Air Force One is Down about top executives of various oil companies travelling in Air Force One when it is hijacked. The idea was turned down by NBC. MacLean then pitched a number of new ideas to networks, each with a 25-30 page treatment. The Hostage Tower was approved by CBS. The network requested the Eiffel Tower be changed to the Statue of Liberty but MacLean refused, feeling the tower was essential, and CBS ultimately agreed.

Filming took twelve weeks starting in October 1979. The entire film was shot in Paris with three weeks shooting on the tower itself. Filming dates were arranged so the Tower scenes were shot during the slow season.

The film marked Douglas Fairbanks Jnr's return to screen acting after a long absence, although he had regularly appeared on stage. As Douglas recalled: "I've been away so long that nothing feels tempting. But this one has a quality team and a sense of sharing that is really creative".

Fontana Books expressed interest in publishing a novelised version of the story. MacLean was busy writing Athabasca so John Denis did the job. The results were well received and Denis then did a novelisation of Air Force One is Down.

Britt Ekland and Maud Adams were previously seen together as Bond girls in The Man with the Golden Gun.

Rachel Roberts was in a great deal of personal turmoil during filming and was worried she would be able to perform. She got through the film with minimal trouble, but she committed suicide not long after filming.

== Reception ==
The Los Angeles Times called it "a preposterous but rather charming piece of escapism".

== Follow-up ==
The roles of Mike Graham and Sabrina Carver are later reprised by Pierce Brosnan and Alexandra Paul in TV adaptations of Death Train and Night Watch, both UNACO novels written for the screen. Death Train also featured Clarke Peters taking over as C. W. Whitlock and Patrick Stewart as Malcolm Philpott.

A mini-series based on Air Force One is Down came out in 2012.
