= The Night Watchman =

The Night Watchman may refer to:

- The Night Watchman (1938 film), a Merrie Melodies cartoon
- The Night Watchman (2015 film), a French-Belgian film
- The Night Watchman (novel), a 2020 novel by Louise Erdrich
- The Night Watchman's Journal, aka The Night Watchmen, a 2014 South Korean television series
- Street Kings, a 2008 motion picture originally titled The Night Watchman

== See also ==
- Nightwatchman (disambiguation)
- The Nightwatchman, a solo project by American musician Tom Morello
- Night Watch (disambiguation)
- The Night Watchmen (disambiguation)
