= The Fare =

- Theatrical release poster
- Directed by: D.C. Hamilton
- Written by: Brinna Kelly
- Produced by: D.C. Hamilton, Brinna Kelly, Gino Anthony Pesi, Kristin Starns
- Starring: Gino Anthony Pesi, Brinna Kelly, Jason Stuart, and Jon Jacobs
- Cinematography: Josh Harrison
- Edited by: D.C. Hamilton
- Music by: Torin Borrowdale
- Production companies: 501 Pictures; Public Displays of Affection; Grady Film
- Distributed by: Epic Pictures
- Release date: December 9, 2018 (Other Worlds Film Festival)
- Running time: 82 min
- Country: United States
- Language: English

The Fare is a 2018 American mystery thriller romance film directed by D.C. Hamilton and starring Gino Anthony Pesi, Brinna Kelly, Jason Stuart, and Jon Jacobs. The film was also released on Blu-ray on 19 November 2019. The plot centers on a taxi driver and his passenger who find themselves locked in a time loop so they have to repeat their journey over and over again.

== Plot ==
A cab drives through the night road to pick up a passenger. The cab driver, Harris Caron, is listening to a radio show about time-traveling aliens who changed the nature of reality. A charming young passenger calling herself Penny gets into his cab and asks to go to the corner of River and Elm. The car moves along a deserted dark highway, and Harris and Penny have a mildly flirtatious conversation. Suddenly, she disappears from the back seat of the car, leaving no trace. Bewildered, Harris contacts dispatch. The Dispatcher says he does not know what to do about a vanishing passenger and that Harris should just reset his fare and return to the city. Harris resets the odometer, and the prior events occur again more or less as they had before, though without Penny giving her name. The car crashes, and the barrier between the seats breaks. Harris grabs Penny's hand and asks if she is all right, calling her Penny. Penny says he used her name this time though she had not given it and tells Harris to remember her this time before she disappears.

Harris again resets the meter, and the events occur again, this time with Harris having vague recollections of prior details. He realizes he has picked up Penny before. Penny, relieved, tells him the ride has occurred at least a hundred times, with Harris never remembering anything, suggesting they are trapped in a time loop that always ends with Penny disappearing and repeating the events. Through subsequent trips, their conversation grows more intimate. Penny, despite making up many humorous stories about her career during past rides, explains she is really in horticulture, which fits her floral attire and accessories. Harris explains he is a taxi driver because his father was, though he hates the job and felt his father wasted his life doing the task and he is doing the same. Penny is sympathetic but says she sees nobility in taking people to their destinations. She also feels trapped by her unhappy arranged marriage. Harris once had a girlfriend whom he met via a taxi ride, but the relationship had ended badly when she left him.

Countless loops later, after Penny's disappearance, Harris decides to look for her. He does not reset his meter and drives down a different road, despite voices whispering to him to turn back. He eventually reaches a bright light where a dark figure demands he turn around. Harris resets his meter. He is still visibly upset when he picks up Penny again, and she comforts him, leading to them making love. Afterward, Harris notices a scar on Penny's head from when she hit her head in the car crash. The scar is old and Harris realizes they are not in a time loop but that time is actually passing. Penny is unable to answer his questions, but tells him to not drink his water before she disappears again.

Harris does not drink his water and picks up a new passenger, an elderly man who asks to go to River and Elm. As he drives, Harris' memory of his old girlfriend returns. The girl he had picked up in his taxi cab was in fact Penny, and they had spent a romantic summer together before she left suddenly. Harris subsequently died in a car crash. Harris takes the old man to River and Elm, a desolate place, and the old man pays him with a gold coin, like many other similar gold coins Harris finds in his cab. The Dispatcher calls to check in and tells Harris to get back to his job. Harris asks what his job is.

The Dispatcher explains that Harris made him his ferryman after his mortal death, a punishment for his and Penny's affair; it is revealed that The Dispatcher is Death, and Penny (who is actually Persephone) is his wife. Death had taken away Harris' memory of Penny, and Penny had provided water to erase his memory of his job. Harris had been unaware of years passing, only aware of when he drove Penny, something that happened yearly as she returned to the underworld.

Harris continues his job and drives many different souls to the afterlife. After a year, it is again time to pick up Penny. She apologizes for everything and implores him to drink the water again for his own sake, but Harris says he has found nobility in his task and that he is grateful for their brief time each year to be together. He drops her off, and they express their feelings for each other before he drives away.

== Cast ==
- Gino Anthony Pesi as Harris
- Brinna Kelly as Penny
- Jason Stuart as The Dispatcher
- Jon Jacobs as Frail Man
- Matt Fontana as Dewey

== Production ==
Filmmaker Brinna Kelly said her inspiration for The Fare "came to me in the form of an email from our director, D.C. Hamilton. He sent me an article about how cab drivers near the Japanese Fukushima Nuclear Power Plant accident were reporting 'phantom fares' in the area. Apparently dazed people would climb into the backs of cabs and then disappear somewhere along the ride... The email came with the note: I think this would make an interesting premise for a horror film. I agreed with him, and took that initial idea of a person disappearing from the backseat of a cab and gave it a Twilight Zone twist." The movie, she said, was shot in six days, "so we were allowed 1-2 takes per setup."

Director D.C. Hamilton said, "We filmed all the taxi interiors on a sound stage in Woodland Hills, California, with our Checker Marathon parked in front of a rear-projection screen. The exteriors with the cab were shot on a long dirt road in Palmdale, California. We did some additional photography in Pasadena and Universal City, California."

The movie was "self-financed based on earnings from my previous collaboration with Brinna Kelly, The Midnight Man", Hamilton said. The Fare, which has both color and black-and-white sequences, was shot in color on Arri Alexa cameras.

== Reception ==
On the review aggregator website Rotten Tomatoes, the film holds an approval rating of 100% based on seven reviews.

Michaela Barton of VultureHound gave the film four stars out of five, stating "Like all great sci-fi mysteries, this feature has a classic twist, with a revelation that builds and is actually supported by small clues hidden within each repeating cycle. The construction of this plot is satisfying, intelligent and earned. As this month is Noir-vember, this indie-feature is a welcomed modern addition to the month." Jeremy Dick of MovieWeb wrote "The pleasing visuals do a lot to enhance The Fare as well, blending black and white with color depending on the context of the scene. A lot of effort went into the cinematography, and aesthetically, this particularly made watching the movie a lot of fun. The noir look is also appropriate given the mystery elements of the thriller, and some twists along the way sort of call back to some of the greatest sci-fi classics from years past. It's an interesting way of paying homage to a style of filmmaking which seems to have gone by the wayside in recent years, giving The Fare a rather unique feel compared to other contemporary movies. Paired with a hooking storyline, the cinematography helps make the movie that much better." Hayley Paskevich of Fleep Screen added "By taking its central premise out of the realm of pure sci-fi and infusing it with a dose of Greek mythology, The Fare skillfully manages to avoid the trappings of monotony, instead driving the plot in a surprising direction, giving it new depth. As simplistic as the film itself may be from a structural standpoint, Pesi and Kelly’s performances are genuinely compelling, making it easy to become invested in the relationship between their characters. Full of twists, turns, and lighthearted humour, The Fare is a mythos-steeped love story that’s ultimately worth the trip, proving that sometimes the journeys we’re destined to take together are more significant than the destination itself."

== Home media ==
Epic Pictures released The Fare on Blu-ray. It includes sections with unused footage, a gag reel, the original opening, and separate commentaries by director D.C. Hamilton and writer-producer-star Brinna Kelly.

== See also ==
- List of films featuring time loops
