= Peter Snell (producer) =

Canadian film producer

Peter Snell is a Canadian film producer. He is notable for the films he made with Alistair MacLean, Don Sharp and Charlton Heston as well as The Wicker Man (1973).

Snell was born in Calgary, Alberta. He moved to London to work in the film industry. His first film was Some May Live. Snell became head of British Lion and greenlit The Wicker Man and Don't Look Now. However the company was taken over by Michael Deeley and Barry Spikings and in 1973 Snell joined the Robert Stigwood Organisation.

He had an affair with Ingrid Pitt during the making of The Wicker Man which reportedly upset her husband George Pinches, head of cinema bookings for the Rank Organisation, and contributed to the film struggling to be released in Britain.

== Select filmography ==
- The Winter's Tale (1967)
- Some May Live (1967)
- Subterfuge (1968)
- Julius Caesar (1970) - starring Heston
- Goodbye Gemini (1970)
- Antony and Cleopatra (1972) - starring and directed by Heston
- The Wicker Man (1973)
- Hennessy (1975) - directed by Sharp
- A Month in the County (1977)
- Bear Island (1979) - directed by Sharp, based on story by MacLean
- The Hostage Tower (1980) - based on story by MacLean
- Mother Lode (1982) - starring and directed by Heston
- Squaring the Circle (1984)
- Turtle Diary (1985)
- Lady Jane (1986)
- A Prayer for the Dying (1987)
- Tears in the Rain (1988) - directed by Sharp
- A Man for All Seasons (1988) - directed by Heston
- Blood Royal: William the Conqueror (1990)
- Treasure Island (1990) - starring Heston
- The Crucifer of Blood (1991) - starring Heston
- Death Train (1993) - based on story by MacLean
- Night Watch (1995) - based on story by MacLean
- Letters from a Killer (1998)
- The Wicker Tree (2011)
- Air Force One Is Down (2013)
