= UNACO =

UNACO, the United Nations Anti-Crime Organization, is a fictional agency within the United Nations created by author Alistair MacLean.

== Literary function ==
In 1980, MacLean was commissioned by an American movie production company to write a series of story outlines to be subsequently produced as movies. He invented UNACO as the device for the stories, writing notes and outlines for a number of adventures. MacLean himself did not expand the finished product, leaving that to other writers.

While some of the outlines were completed as screenplays, a greater number were expanded into novels. In 1980 and 1981, John Edwards (former editor of the BBC's That's Life programme) and Denis Frost worked together under the pen name "John Denis" on the first two novels/screenplays. A few years later, (1989–93) Alastair MacNeill wrote some screenplays and a number of novels from the source outlines. In the later 1990s, author Hugh Miller completed the last two UNACO novels, still working from MacLean's original notes and outlines.

Some of the works bear little resemblance to MacLean's style, especially in their use of gratuitous sex and violence.

== UNACO fictional history ==
The prologue of each novel repeats the formation story for UNACO. The concept is that, "in September 1979, the Secretary-General of the United Nations chaired a meeting attended by 46 envoys representing virtually every country in the world...", creating UNACO to "...avert, neutralize, and/or apprehend individuals or groups engaged in international criminal activities. ...UNACO's clandestine existence began on March 1, 1980".

UNACO uses groups of people to form "strike forces". Each strike force has a leader who communicates with UNACO's top commanders. UNACO also works with other agencies around the world.

== Characters ==
- Malcolm Philpott - founder and head of UNACO, a former professor at a New England university.
- Mike Graham - a former Delta Force officer and CIA operative, Graham's pregnant wife was killed by a terrorist.
- Clarence Wilkins Whitlock - C.W. is an African-American cat burglar, dubbed the "Black Spiderman".
- Sabrina Carver - a high class jewel thief, Sabrina like C.W. was personally recruited by Philpott.

Although the character names remain the same, their backgrounds are changed from the John Denis books (detailed above) to the Alastair MacNeill books. Philpott is changed to Scottish and is the former head of Scotland Yard before forming UNACO. Graham comes straight to UNACO from Delta Force after his wife and 5 year old son are kidnapped by terrorists and never found, Carver is changed to a languages graduate who studied at the Sorbonne and joined the FBI before leaving for UNACO and Whitlock is a 44 year old Kenyan who was educated in Britain and then returned home to Army Intelligence before being recruited by UNACO. Sergei Kolchinsky, a former KGB agent, is heavily featured as Philpott's deputy in the Alastair MacNeill books (in the John Denis books Philpott's deputy is Sonia Kolchinsky and the two are romantically involved). Jacques Rust, based in Zurich, is also a recurring character in the Alastair MacNeill books. He was formerly part of Strike Force 3 with Whitlock and Carver before being paralysed by a bullet to the spine and replaced by Graham. Rust now heads up European operations.

== List of works ==
Year	Title	Author, using MacLean's notes	Films
1980	Hostage Tower	John Denis	Hostage Tower (1980)
1981	Air Force One is Down	John Denis	
1989	Death Train	Alastair MacNeill	Death Train (1993)
1989	Night Watch	Alastair MacNeill	Night Watch (1995)
1990	Red Alert	Alastair MacNeill	
1991	Time of the Assassins	Alastair MacNeill	
1992	Dead Halt	Alastair MacNeill	
1993	Code Breaker	Alastair MacNeill	
1997	Prime Target	Hugh Miller	
1998	Borrowed Time	Hugh Miller	
