= Scott Kennedy (comedian) =

American stand-up comedian (1965–2013)

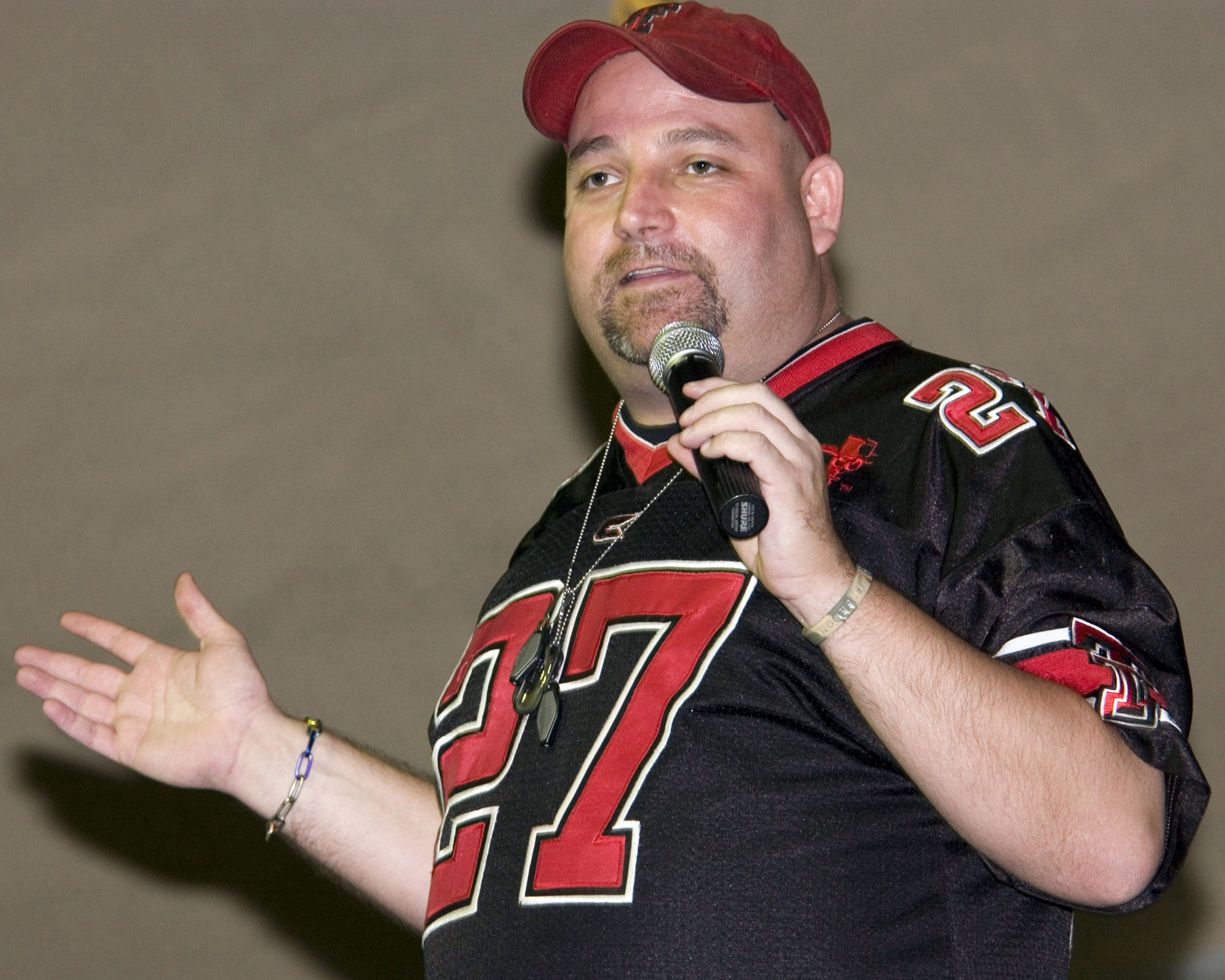
- Kennedy in 2005
- Born: July 7, 1965; Albuquerque, New Mexico, U.S.
- Died: March 14, 2013 (aged 47)
- Partner: Kevin Maye

Comedy career
- Medium: Comedy, television, film
- Genre: Observational comedy

Scott Kennedy (July 7, 1965 – March 14, 2013) was an American stand-up comedian.

== Early life and education ==
Kennedy was born in Albuquerque, New Mexico, and raised in Hobbs. He attended New Mexico Military Institute and graduated from Monterey High School in Lubbock, Texas, after his family moved there. He earned a Bachelor of Arts in psychology from the College of Santa Fe.

== Career ==
He got his start in comedy in 1986 at an open mic night at the Froggy Bottoms Comedy Club in Lubbock, where a friend had entered him in a comedy contest. He moved to Houston and then in 1999 to Los Angeles. He had a successful stand-up career, performing at clubs throughout the country. He was featured performer at HBO's US Comedy Arts Festival in Aspen, Colorado, and on Comedy Central was so successful on Premium Blend that he was given a half-hour special in 2004.

Kennedy was openly gay, and appeared in Jason Stuart's 2004 improvised comedy film about gay dating, 10 Attitudes. In 1994, with his partner Kevin Maye, he co-founded the Gay Comedy Jam, which toured over 150 cities in the U.S. and Canada.

In the mid-2000s, Kennedy began touring extensively to entertain American troops on active duty, starting with USO tours in Afghanistan with Dave Attell. He formed his own touring company, Comics Ready to Entertain, to go to more dangerous places than the USO was willing to send him to, performing up to five times a day on over 50 tours in Afghanistan and Iraq.

A documentary about Scott's life, work, and legacy is currently in production. It is being produced by Simon Thompson and Matty Kirsch.

== Personal life ==
Kennedy was found dead on March 14, 2013, evidently having died in his sleep.
