= Night Watch =

Night Watch or Nightwatch may refer to:

== Being on duty at night ==
- The nighttime shift worked by a security guard (night watchman)
- Watchman (law enforcement), organized groups of men to deter criminal activity and provide law enforcement
- One of the watches stood by sailors who are watchkeeping

== Books ==
- The Night Watch, a 1977 memoir by Central Intelligence Agency officer David Atlee Phillips

=== Novels ===
- Night Watch, a 1972 play by American dramatist Lucille Fletcher, later adapted into the 1973 film)
- Night Watch, a 1989 UNACO novel by Alastair MacNeill
- Night Watch, a 1990 novel by American writer Robin Wayne Bailey
- Night Watch (Sigurðardóttir novel), a 1992 novel by Icelandic author Fríða Á. Sigurðardóttir
- The Night Watch, a 1997 novel by American-Canadian science fiction and fantasy author Sean Stewart
- Night Watch (Lukyanenko novel), a 1998 fantasy novel by Russian author Sergei Lukyanenko
- Nightwatch, a 1999 novel by American novelist and screenwriter Richard P. Henrick
- Night Watch (Pratchett novel), a 2002 fantasy novel by British writer Terry Pratchett
- The Night Watch (Waters novel), a 2006 historical fiction novel by Sarah Waters
- Night Watch, a 2012 novel by American author, attorney, and former New York City prosecutor Linda Fairstein
- Night Watch (Phillips novel), a 2023 novel by American author Jayne Anne Phillips

== Fictional elements ==
- Night's Watch, a group of characters from the A Song of Ice and Fire series of epic fantasy novels
- Nightwatch (character), a fictional character appearing in American comic books published by Marvel Comics
- Raphael (Teenage Mutant Ninja Turtles) (also Nightwatcher), a fictional superhero
- A paramilitary group in the Babylon 5 universe

== Films ==
- The Night Watch (1925 film), a French drama film directed by Marcel Silver
- The Night Watch (1926 film), a lost silent film directed by Fred Caldwell
- Night Watch (1928 film), an American drama film directed by Alexander Korda
- The Hole (1960 film) (also The Night Watch in the US), a French crime film directed by Jacques Becker
- Night Watch (1973 film), a British-American suspense-thriller film directed by Brian G. Hutton
- Nightwatch (1994 film), a Danish thriller film directed and written by Danish director Ole Bornedal
- Night Watch (1995 film), an American television spy film directed by David Jackson
- Nightwatch (1997 film), an American horror thriller film directed by Ole Bornedal
- Night Watch (2004 film), a Russian urban fantasy supernatural thriller film directed by Timur Bekmambetov
- Rond Nocturna (English: Night Watch), a 2005 film by Argentinian writer and filmmaker Edgardo Cozarinsky
- Nightwatching, a 2007 film directed by Peter Greenaway
- The Night Watch, a 2010 film adaptation of Sarah Waters' 2006 historical fiction novel The Night Watch

== Music ==
- "Night Watch" (song), the eighth track from Fleetwood Mac's 1973 album Penguin
- "Night Watch", the eighth track from Tegan and Sara's 2009 album Sainthood
- Nightwatch (album), the second solo album from Kenny Loggins
- Nightwatch a 2003 album by Norwegian jazz vocalist and songwriter Silje Nergaard
- The Night Watch (album), a live album by the English rock band King Crimson
- "The Night Watch", the fourth track from King Crimson's 1974 album Starless and Bible Black
- Noisia (also Nightwatch), a Dutch electronic music trio

== Television ==
- CBS Overnight News (also CBS News Nightwatch), an American overnight news broadcast
- Nightwatch with Steve Scott, a weekday late-night documentary series in the UK on ITV
- Nightwatch (TV series), an unscripted television series broadcast by A&E

== Other uses ==
- The Night Watch, a 1642 painting by Rembrandt van Rijn
- Night Watch (video game), a tactical role-playing game developed by Russian developer Nival Interactive
- Night's Watch (Green Ronin Publishing), a 2009 supplement for A Song of Ice and Fire Roleplaying
- Nochnoy Dozor (group) (English: Night Watch), a group of mostly Russophone political activists living in Estonia
- Operation Nightwatch, a mission undertaken by Boeing E-4 and previously by Boeing EC-135s
- Gender neutral term for Nightwatchman (cricket)
- "The Nightwatch", a 2004 art installation by Francis Alÿs

== See also ==
- Nightwatchman
- Watches of the Night
