= Game of Life (film) =

- Directed by: Joseph Merhi
- Written by: Joseph Merhi
- Produced by: Joseph Merhi; Theodore Melfi
- Starring: Tom Sizemore; Tom Arnold; Heather Locklear; Jill Hennessy; Richard T. Jones; Orson Bean; Beverly D'Angelo; Richard T. Jones; Nicholas Kadi; Marina Sirtis; Osman Soykut; Gino Anthony Pesi
- Cinematography: Ken Blakey
- Edited by: Patrea Patrick
- Music by: Jon Lee
- Production company: Metro-Goldwyn-Mayer
- Distributed by: Metro-Goldwyn-Mayer
- Release date: April 14, 2007
- Running time: 100 minutes
- Country: United States
- Language: English

Game of Life (originally known as Oranges) is a 2007 film drama starring Tom Sizemore, Tom Arnold, Heather Locklear and Jill Hennessy. The film was not fully released until 2011, when it was released under the new title Game of Life.

== Plot ==
The film plot follows a children's soccer team which is the common link for a multi-layered story giving a candid look into the intersecting lives of five families living and working in Los Angeles. Oranges examines the complexities of racial and class divisions and reveals that despite the fragile volatility of human relationships, family is what holds us together and unites us all.

== Cast ==
- Tom Sizemore as Burt
- Tom Arnold as Richard
- Heather Locklear as Irene
- Samuel Carman as Mario
- Jill Hennessy as Brenda
- Richard T. Jones as Mark
- Beverly D'Angelo as Kathy
- Ruth Livier as Marta
- Orson Bean as Dennis
- Salvator Xuereb as Pierce
- Katharine Powell as Linda
- Dylan Minnette as Billy
- Marina Sirtis as Mrs. Rafiki
- Ozman Sirgood as Mr. Rafiki (credited as Osman Soykut)
- Claire Yarlett as Kelly
- Christina Tribull as Christina
- David Skyler as Anthony
- Rene Raymond Rivera as Hector
- Shawn Prince as Derrick Johnson
- Gino Anthony Pesi as James
- Kamala Lopez as Nadia (credited as Kamala Lopez-Dawson)
- Darren Kenneally as Officer Mahoney
- Rick Gonzalez as Gerardo
- John Sterling Carter as Joe
- Suzan Brittan as Sooha
- Edward P. Blinn as Don (credited as Ed Blinn)
- Brandon Bassir as Jonnie (credited as Brandon Bass)
- Frank Ashmore as Rick
- Erik Jensen as Larry
- Ragan Wallake as Stacey
