= The Night Watchmen =

The Night Watchmen may refer to:

- The Night Watchmen (film), a 2017 horror film
- The Night Watchmen (TV series), an Australian sports television show

== See also ==
- The Night Watchman (disambiguation)
