= Nightwatchman =

Nightwatchman may refer to:

- Watchman (law enforcement)
- Nightwatchman (cricket), a lower-order batsman who comes in to bat higher up the order than usual near the end of the day's play
- "Nightwatchman", a song by Tom Petty and the Heartbreakers from Hard Promises
- The Nightwatchman, or Tom Morello, a musician
- Night-watchman state, a government ideal restricted to the upholding of negative rights
- a security guard who works at night
- Nightwatchman (film), a 2000 Italian film
- Street Kings or The Night Watchman, a 2008 film
- Night Watchman (radar), Canadian WWII-era radar

== See also ==
- Watchman (disambiguation)
- Night Watch (disambiguation)
- The Night Watchman (disambiguation)
