= Lee Garlington =

American actress (born 1953)

- Born: Ann Leslie Garlington; July 20, 1953 (age 73); Teaneck, New Jersey, U.S.
- Occupation: Actress
- Years active: 1981–present
- Spouse: Howard Nugent

Ann Leslie "Lee" Garlington (born July 20, 1953) is an American actress.

== Early life ==
Garlington was born in Teaneck, New Jersey on July 20, 1953. She spent her teenage years in Wilmington, Delaware.

== Career ==
Garlington has guest-starred in a number of notable television series, including The West Wing, 7th Heaven, 8 Simple Rules, CSI: Crime Scene Investigation, Judging Amy, Will & Grace, Matlock, L.A. Law, The Practice, Quantum Leap, Home Improvement, Boston Legal, Roseanne, Get a Life, Coach, Profiler, Medium, Buffy the Vampire Slayer, Two and a Half Men, Lie to Me and among other series. She also played the part of Kirsten, Rose Nylund's (Betty White) daughter in the final season of The Golden Girls and Ronni Rapalono, the mistress of Joey Tribbiani's father on Friends. From 2002 to 2005, she had a recurring role as Brenda Baxworth on Everwood. She was one of the stars of the series Lenny.

Garlington also appeared in the sequels to Alfred Hitchcock's Psycho, Psycho II (1983) and Psycho III (1986). She starred alongside Sylvester Stallone and Brigitte Nielsen in the action/thriller Cobra (1986), and played Demi Moore's obstetrician in The Seventh Sign (1988). In Sneakers (1992), she appeared as Dr. Elena Rhyzkov, a Czechoslovak mathematics scientist, in a scene with Robert Redford.

Garlington was originally intended to play the lead female role in Seinfeld. She was the female regular in the pilot episode, "The Seinfeld Chronicles", playing the waitress Claire at Pete's Luncheonette. When the series was picked up, however, it was decided that having the female lead be from such a different social status compared to the rest of the cast would be unworkable, so the character was dropped and replaced by Elaine Benes.

In 2021, Garlington worked in the Discovery+ film Candy Coated Christmas.

== Awards ==
In 2018, Garlington received a Primetime Emmy Award nomination for Outstanding Actress in a Short Form Comedy or Drama Series for her role as Darlene in Broken.

== Personal life ==
Garlington is married to electrician Howard Nugent.

She was a bridesmaid for Demi Moore for her second marriage.

== Filmography ==
=== Film ===
Year	Title	Role	Notes
1983	Psycho II	Myrna	
1986	Cobra	Nancy Stalk	
1986	Psycho III	Myrna	
1987	Some Kind of Wonderful	Gym teacher	
1988	The Seventh Sign	Dr. Margaret Inness	
1989	Field of Dreams	Beulah Gasnick	
1990	Meet the Applegates	Nita Samson	
1992	Sneakers	Dr. Elena Rhyzkov	
1993	Jack the Bear	Mrs. Festinger	
1993	My Life	Carol Sandman	
1994	Reflections on a Crime	Tina	
1995	The Babysitter	Dolly Tucker	
1996	Driven	Marian	
1997	Dante's Peak	Dr. Jane Fox	
2000	Forever Lulu	Linda Davis	
2001	Layover	Boone	
2001	American Pie 2	Natalie's Mom	
2002	The Sum of All Fears	Mary Pat Foley	
2002	The Hot Chick	Vice-Principal Bernard	
2002	One Hour Photo	Waitress	
2004	Johnson Family Vacation	Betty Sue	
2004	Guarding Eddy	Helen	
2005	A Lot Like Love	Stewardess	
2005	Mortuary	Rita	
2006	Something New	Mrs. Cahan	
2006	Stick It	Head Vault Judge	
2008	Just Add Water	Penny	
2008	Pulse 2: Afterlife	Aunt Carmen	Video
2008	The Coverup	Beverly Thacker	
2010	A Buddy Story	Susan's Mom	
2014	Sister	Principal Jacobs	
2014	The Angriest Man in Brooklyn	Gummy	
2014	The Extendables	Paint	
2014	Some Kind of Beautiful	Wendy	
2015	Safelight	Dottie	
2015	Band of Robbers	Lt. Polly	
2016	Do You Take This Man	Esther	
2016	Her Last Will	Ruth	
2017	House by the Lake	Dr. Llywelyn	
2018	North Blvd	Liz	
2018	Christmas Harmony	Debbie	
2021	The Little Things	Landlady	
2021	Candy Coated Christmas	Kim Winters	Discovery+ film
2026	Redlining	Katie Gurney	
TBA	Boy's Name	Elsee	Pre-production

=== Television ===
Year	Title	Role	Notes
1984	Jessie	Pat	Episode: "Valerie's Turn"
1985	Hill Street Blues	Maura	Episodes: "Hacked to Pieces", "Seoul on Ice"
1986	Stingray	Anne	Episode: "Below the Line"
1987	Matlock	Paula	Episode: "The Chef"
1987	Sledge Hammer!	Dr. Sara Johanssen / Markovich	Episode: "Comrade Hammer"
1987	Amen	Domina	Episode: "Into the Night"
1987	L.A. Law	Regina Furnald	Episode: "Pigmalion"
1987	Student Exchange	Mrs. Whitcoms	TV film
1987	Family Ties	Beth Davis	Episode: "Miracle in Columbus"
1987–1988	Hooperman	Gail	Episodes: "John Doe, We Hardly Knew Ye", "The Naked and the Dead", "In Search of Bijoux"
1988	Down Delaware Road	Janet Rhonda	TV film
1988	Winnie	Gladys	TV film
1988	Raising Miranda	Helen Lundquist	Episode: "Marcine Shoplifts"
1989	Murphy Brown	Shawnee	Episode: "It's How You Play the Game"
1989	Heartbeat	Judy Pellman	Episode: "What the Inspector Saw"
1989	Seinfeld	Claire	Episode: "Good News, Bad News"
1989	Cold Sassy Tree	Mary Willis	TV film
1989	A Brand New Life	Linda	Episodes: "The Honeymooners", "Above and Beyond Therapy", "Private School"
1989	The Nutt House	Angelica	Episode: "Suites, Lies and Videotape"
1989, 1991	Roseanne	Carole Karoszek / Karen Miller	Episodes: "Death and Stuff", "Santa Claus"
1990	Last Flight Out	Jan	TV film
1990	A Killing in a Small Town	Peggy Blankenship	TV film
1990	Bar Girls	Shelly	TV film
1990	When You Remember Me	Joanne	TV film
1990–1991	Lenny	Shelly Callahan	Main role
1991	Get a Life	Patti	Episode: "Married"
1991	The Whereabouts of Jenny	Gina	TV film
1991	Who's the Boss?	Ms. Foster	Episode: "Tony and Angela Get Divorced"
1991	Quantum Leap	Nurse Chatam	Episode: "Shock Theater"
1991	Posing: Inspired by Three Real Stories	Josette	TV film
1991	Coach	Barbara	Episode: "I Hate Barbara"
1992	Reasonable Doubts	Martine Sullivan	Episode: "The Shadow of Death"
1992	Blossom	Samy	Episode: "Whines and Misdemeanors"
1992	The Golden Girls	Kirsten	Episode: "Home Again, Rose: Part 2"
1992	Shame	Tina Farrell	TV film
1992	Arresting Behavior	Connie Ruskin	Main role
1992	When No One Would Listen	Lee	TV film
1993	Kiss of a Killer	Helaine	TV film
1993	Dying to Love You	Rita	TV film
1993	Sirens	Ann Hollings	Episode: "Everybody Lies"
1993	Torch Song	Phyllis	TV film
1993	River of Rage: The Taking of Maggie Keene	Janice	TV film
1993	Love Matters	Nan	TV film
1993	The Conviction of Kitty Dodds	Anne Williams	TV film
1993	Bakersfield P.D.	Judy Hampton	Episode: "The Gift"
1993	Home Improvement	Joanie Graham	Episode: "Feud for Thought"
1994	Birdland	Diane Van de Ven	Episode: "Crazy for You"
1994	Wings	Vi	Episode: "Exclusively Yours"
1994	The Yarn Princess	Wanda	TV film
1994	Phenom	Marla Casey	Episode: "Just a Family of Doolans Sittin' Around Talkin'"
1994	Take Me Home Again	Nell	TV film
1994	Higher Education	Faye	Main role
1995	See Jane Run	Carole Garson	TV film
1995	Friends	Ronni Rapalono	Episode: "The One with the Boobies"
1995	Whose Daughter Is She?	Annie	TV film
1995	The Monroes	Bailey Izzy	Episode: "Emission Control"
1995, 1997	Grace Under Fire	Emily	Episodes: "Matthew Gets Busted", "Matthew's Old Lady"
1996	Summer of Fear	Winnie	TV film
1996	Champs	Jeanette	Episode: "Two of a Kind"
1996	Profiler	Dr. Frances Barry	Episode: "Insight"
1996	Dark Skies	Betty Hill	Episode: "The Awakening (Pilot)"
1996	Townies	Kathy Donovan	Main role
1997	Total Security	Karen Des Moines	Episode: "Wet Side Story"
1997	Nash Bridges	Jill Reichert	Episode: "Shake, Rattle & Roll"
1997	Chicago Hope	Carol Sardos	Episode: "The Lung and the Restless"
1997, 1999, 2004	NYPD Blue	Rosie DePaul / Lea Chambers / Margret Lidz	Episodes: "Three Girls and a Baby", "Mister Roberts", "The Vision Thing"
1998	The Net	Carol Walters	Episode: "Bulls and Bears"
1998	Maximum Bob	Rosellen Fortenot	Episode: "Bay of Big's"
1998	Martial Law	Judge Mary Ruben	Episode: "Cop Out"
1999	Can of Worms	Dana Pillsbury	TV film
1999	Snoops	Alicia Spitz Gordon	Episode: "The Heartless Bitch"
2000	If These Walls Could Talk 2	Georgette	TV film, segment: '1972'
2000	Blood Money	Jeri Williams	TV film
2001	Judging Amy	Dr. Kemper	Episode: "The Undertow"
2001	Stranger Inside	Warden Arnold	TV film
2001	Titus	Sue	Episode: "NASCAR"
2001	Murder, She Wrote: The Last Free Man	Laura Lee Kestes	TV film
2001	Gideon's Crossing	Barb Palmer	Episode: "Clinical Enigma"
2002	Touched by an Angel	Dr. Josephs	Episode: "Ship-in-a-Bottle"
2002	Buffy the Vampire Slayer	Jessica Harris	Episode: "Hell's Bells"
2002	Once and Again	Ms. Conway	Episode: "Experience Is the Teacher"
2002, 2005	Six Feet Under	Fiona Kleinschmidt	Episodes: "Back to the Garden", "The Rainbow of Her Reasons"
2002–2005	Everwood	Brenda Baxworth	Recurring role (seasons 1–3)
2003	Abby	Jeanette Morris	Episode: "Abby's First Date"
2003	Joan of Arcadia	Charlotte Bloom	Episode: "Touch Move"
2003	Dragnet	Mrs. Price	Episode: "The Magic Bullet"
2003	Grounded for Life	Louise	Episode: "Been Caught Stealing"
2003, 2009	CSI: Crime Scene Investigation	Mrs. Frommer / Mrs. Briggs	Episodes: "Forever", "The Lost Girls"
2003, 2005–2006	The West Wing	Alana Waterman	Episodes: "Red Haven's on Fire", "Here Today", "Welcome to Wherever You Are"
2004	Cold Case	Carol Prosser	Episode: "Late Returns"
2004	The District	Evelyn Parras	Episode: "Passing Time"
2004	Desperate Housewives	Alberta Holstein	Episode: "Anything You Can Do"
2004	Will & Grace	Annette	Episodes: "Queens for a Day: Parts 1 & 2"
2004–2005	8 Simple Rules	Fran / Leslie	Episodes: "Mother's Day", "VolleyBrawl"
2005	NCIS	Mary Hanlan	Episode: "The Meat Puzzle"
2005	Detective	Beatrice Doil	TV film
2005	Grey's Anatomy	Fara Linden	Episode: "Deny, Deny, Deny"
2005	Invasion	Helen Conrad	Episode: "The Cradle"
2006	Big Love	Grace Ann	Episode: "Eviction"
2006	Close to Home	Hannah Turley	Episode: "A Father's Story"
2007	Big Day	Wendy	Episode: "The Ceremony"
2007	Crossing Jordan	Dixie	Episode: "Night of the Living Dead"
2007	Two and a Half Men	Peggy	Episode: "I Merely Slept with a Commie"
2007	What About Brian	Mona	Episode: "What About Calling All Friends..."
2007	Boston Legal	Alisa McKenzie	Episode: "Trial of the Century"
2007	The Young and the Restless	Probation Officer Cavanaugh	Episode: "1.8709"
2007–2008	The Riches	Jane Fedley	Episodes: "Operation Education", "Field of Dreams"
2008	Medium	Marion Wheeler	Episodes: "Wicked Game: Parts 1 & 2"
2008	The Game	Bren	Episode: "Baby on Board"
2009	Saving Grace	Sally Meeker	Episode: "Watch Siggybaby Burn"
2009	Mrs. Washington Goes to Smith	Jane Burns	TV film
2009	Nip/Tuck	Briggitte Reinholt	Episode: "Briggitte Reinholt"
2009–2010	Southland	Cathleen Kerik	Episodes: "Sally in the Alley", "The Runner"
2010	FlashForward	Carlene	Episodes: "Goodbye Yellow Brick Road", "The Negotiation"
2010	Lie to Me	Mrs. Walker	Episode: "Beat the Devil"
2010	Psych	Eugenia	Episode: "Chivalry Is Not Dead... But Someone Is"
2010	The Whole Truth	Judge Amy Shapiro	Episode: "True Confessions"
2011	Good Luck Charlie	Mrs. Krump	Episode: "Duncan vs. Duncan"
2011	Friends with Benefits	Billie	Episode: "The Benefit of Mardi Gras"
2011–2012	The Killing	Ruth Yitanes	Recurring role (seasons 1–2)
2012	The Mentalist	Betty Fulford	Episode: "Devil's Cherry"
2012	Emily Owens, M.D.	Donna Fisher	Episode: "Emily and... the Outbreak"
2013	Private Practice	Stella Peterson	Episode: "Good Fries Are Hard to Come By"
2013	The Bridge	Sherry Spellman	Episodes: "Calaca", "Rio", "Maria of the Desert"
2013	Dads	Janet	Episode: "My Dad's Hotter Than Your Dad"
2014	Suburgatory	Dorothy	Episode: "I'm Just Not That Into Me"
2014	Longmire	Ruth	Episode: "Of Children and Travelers"
2014	Stalker	Dep. Chief Diane Kindrick	Episode: "Crazy for You"
2014–2015	Mistresses	Eleanor	Guest role (seasons 2–3)
2015	40's and Failing	Rhonda Bodes	Episode: "Statistics"
2015	Major Crimes	Janet Sloan	Episode: "Turn Down"
2016	iZombie	Muriel Fletcher	Episode: "Fifty Shades of Grey Matter"
2016	Childrens Hospital	Geraldine Peters	Episode: "Through the Eyes of a Falcon"
2016	The Engagement Clause	Elizabeth 'Bitsy' Tate	TV film
2017	The Magicians	Dana	Episode: "The Cock Barrens"
2018	Alexa & Katie	Loretta	Episode: "Thanksgiving"
2018	Broken	Darlene	TV series
2022	Dead to Me	Francine	Episode "We're Gonna Beat This Thing"
2025	Electric Bloom	Ethel	Episode: "How We Learned to Love Our Haters"

=== Web series ===
Year	Title	Role	Notes
2022	On Cinema	Herself	Episode: "The 9th Annual On Cinema Oscar Special"
