= Brinna Kelly =

American film producer and actress

Brinna Kelly is an American film producer, writer, and actress. She is known for writing and acting in The Fare and The Midnight Man.

== Early life and career ==
Kelly began her acting career as a child, in television dramas in Asia. She later moved to Los Angeles and graduated from UCLA's School of Theater, Film and Television.

Her writing and producing debut, The Midnight Man, was released in 2016. In 2017, she produced the horror short The Binding. In 2018, she wrote and starred in The Fare.
