= Echo (1997 film) =

- Written by: Peter Steinfeld
- Directed by: Charles Correll
- Starring: Jack Wagner, Alexandra Paul
- Music by: John Scott
- Country of origin: United States
- Original language: English

Production
- Producers: Janet Faust Krusi; Donald Kushner; Peter Locke
- Cinematography: John S. Bartley
- Editor: Jerrold L. Ludwig
- Running time: 96 minutes

Original release
- Network: American Broadcasting Company
- Release: January 5, 1997

Echo is a 1997 erotic thriller film directed by Charles Correll made for TV starring Jack Wagner and Alexandra Paul. The film was also known as Deadly Echo in Canada and the United Kingdom.

== Plot ==
Identical twins, Max and Steven Jordan (Jack Wagner), were separated at birth after a car accident that killed their parents. Max goes on to live a successful life with caring foster parents, but Steven leads a life of despair, and feels that he has been denied the life that he was entitled to, and plots revenge against his unsuspecting brother.

Steven soon gets involved in his brother's idyllic life and begins to manipulate events. In a plot twist, he eventually succeeds by manipulating his brother's wife, Olivia (Alexandra Paul) to kill her legitimate husband, thinking she is killing Steven.

At the end of the film, Olivia is pregnant with Steven's child without her knowing it.

== Main cast ==
- Jack Wagner as Max & Steven Jordan
- Alexandra Paul as Olivia Jordan
- Kin Shriner as Jackson Lewis
- Clare Carey as Tess Lewis
- Laurie Holden as Scarlett Antonelli
- Ray Baker as Stu Fishman
- Teryl Rothery as Ruth Jordan
- Anthony Harrison as Len Jordan
- Fulvio Cecere as Lawrence Russo
- Venus Terzo as Kathy
