= David Jackson (director) =

American director

David Jackson is an American television director and television writer.

Since the 1980s, Jackson has amassed many credits in television. Some of his directorial credits include Swamp Thing: The Series, Lois & Clark: The New Adventures of Superman, Nash Bridges, Dark Angel, Smallville, Profiler, Charmed, The District, One Tree Hill, CSI: NY, The Cape as well as directing and writing episodes for Miami Vice, 21 Jump Street, and The Equalizer.

In addition, he has directed and written a number of television films, namely Death Train (1993), Night Watch (1995), The Lake (1998), Atomic Train (1999), the Disney Channel original film Buffalo Dreams, Return to Halloweentown, and other films.
