= Redlining (film) =

- Film poster
- Directed by: Jason Stuart
- Written by: Jason Stuart; Lee Garlington
- Produced by: Jason Stuart
- Starring: Alexandra Paul; Jason Stuart; Lee Garlington; Kareem Ferguson
- Cinematography: Billy Clift
- Edited by: Billy Clift
- Release date: August 2026 (Hip Hop Film Fest)
- Country: United States
- Language: English

Redlining is a 2026 dramatic film directed, produced, starring and co-written by Jason Stuart.

The film also stars Alexandra Paul, Lee Garlington and Kareem Ferguson.

== Plot ==
Two Southern American families, one black, one white, clash over who owns a house when their parents are gone.

== Critical reception ==
The Word, "The film explores generational wealth, systemic inequality, and the quiet, lasting damage of housing discrimination, but Stuart doesn’t approach it like a lecture."

Metrosource, "The fact that queer audiences and Black audiences share a voracious appetite for Redlining speaks to both its universality and authenticity."
