= The Winter's Tale (1967 film) =

- Directed by: Frank Dunlop
- Based on: The Winter's Tale by William Shakespeare
- Produced by: Peter Snell
- Starring: Laurence Harvey
- Production company: Seven Arts Productions
- Release date: 1967
- Country: United Kingdom
- Language: English

The Winter's Tale is a 1967 British TV film based on The Winter's Tale by William Shakespeare. Directed by Frank Dunlop, it stars Laurence Harvey and Jane Asher. It was produced by Peter Snell and filmed in 1966. It was adapted from a popular stage production at the Edinburgh Festival which had a successful transfer to London.

The movie was distributed on the US college circuit in 1967. It got a cinema release in the UK in 1968.

Tom Baker, in an uncredited role, made his film debut in the film.

== Cast ==
- Laurence Harvey as King Leontes
- Jane Asher as Perdita
- Diana Churchill as Paulina
- Moira Redmond as Hermione
- Jim Dale as Autolycus
- Esmond Knight as Camillo
