= The Pit and the Pendulum (2009 film) =

Edgar Allan Poe's The Pit and the Pendulum
- DVD release cover
- Directed by: David DeCoteau
- Written by: Simon Savory
- Based on: The Pit and the Pendulum; 1842 story by Edgar Allan Poe
- Produced by: Paul Colichman; Stephen P. Jarchow; John Schouweiler
- Starring: Lorielle New; Stephen Hansen; Bart Viotila
- Cinematography: Howard Wexler
- Edited by: Danny Draven (as Jack Harkness)
- Music by: Jerry Lambert
- Production company: Rapid Heart Pictures
- Distributed by: E1 Entertainment; Regent Releasing; Regent Worldwide Sales
- Release date: April 24, 2009
- Running time: 86 minutes
- Country: United States
- Language: English

Edgar Allan Poe's The Pit and the Pendulum is a 2009 horror erotic film directed by David DeCoteau and starring Lorielle New, Stephen Hansen and Bart Voitila. It is retelling of Edgar Allan Poe's classic 1842 short story "The Pit and the Pendulum" with a new twist.

== Plot summary ==
Seven students answer an advertisement to participate in an experiment to explore how the sensation of pain can be eliminated. Arriving at a secluded institute, they are welcomed by mysterious and eccentric scientist JB Divay (Lorielle New). But when students begin to disappear one by one, they begin to question JB's true intentions. In a final showdown, Jason (Stephen Hansen) confronts her and discovers his boyfriend Kyle (Bart Voitila) strapped to a table beneath her final experiment, inches away from the razor's edge.

== Cast ==
- Lorielle New as JB Divay
- Stephen Hansen as Jason
- Bart Voitila as Kyle
- Danielle Demski as Alicia
- Amy Paffrath as Gemma
- Tom Sandoval as Vinnie
- Greg Sestero as Alicia's Boyfriend
- Michael King as Trevor
- Jason-Shane Scott as Julian
- Andrew Bowen as Alan Divay
- Jason Stuart as Dimitri Divay
