= Gino Anthony Pesi =

American actor (born 1980)

- Born: Gino Anthony Pesi; November 3, 1980 (age 45); Pittsburgh, Pennsylvania, U.S.
- Occupation: Actor
- Years active: 2002–present

Gino Anthony Pesi (born November 3, 1980) is an American actor. He is best known for his role as James Nava in the NBC series Shades of Blue.

== Early life ==
Pesi was born on November 3, 1980, in Pittsburgh, Pennsylvania, at Magee-Women's Hospital. He grew up as an only child in the Monongahela Valley with an affinity for sports and entertainment. He attended Geibel Catholic Junior-Senior High School in Connellsville before transferring to Charleroi High School, where he graduated in 1999. He graduated from Point Park University, Conservatory of Performing Arts as a theater major with a concentration in acting.

In 2013, Pesi was diagnosed with acromegaly while filming 42. Alfredo Quiñones-Hinojosa removed his tumor, and Pesi credits "Dr. Q" with allowing "me the opportunity to better my health." Pesi refers to this experience as "the greatest gift I've had," with a better appreciation of his life.

== Filmography ==
=== Film ===
Year	Title	Role	Notes
2002	Minimal Knowledge	Police Officer #2	
2007	Game of Life	James	
2007	Loveless in Los Angeles	Taylor	
2007	X's & O's	Riles	
2008	The Hottie & the Nottie	Cheesy Guy	
2008	A 1000 Points of Light	Gerry	Video
2010	Takers	Paulie Jr.	
2010	iHeart	Make-out Dude	Short
2010	Batman of Suburbia	Lou Apachu	Video
2011	S.W.A.T.: Firefight	Wayne Wolport	Video
2011	Battle: Los Angeles	Cpl. Nick Stavrou	
2012	Fifteen Digits	Rich	Short
2012	Turning Point	-	Short
2013	42	Joe Garagiola	
2014	The Cookie Mobster	Fish	TV movie
2018	The Fare	Harris	
2019	Hidden in Plain Sight	Nick	TV movie
2021	Construction	Bobby Kidman	
2024	First Shift	Deo Russo	
TBA	First Shift: Vengeance	Deo Russo	Post-production; also writer
TBA	First Shift: Redemption	Deo Russo	Post-production; also writer

=== Television ===
Year	Title	Role	Notes
2005	CSI: Miami	Guard	Episode: "Identity"
2006	What I Like About You	Tony Meladeo	Episode: "Garden State"
2006	Cold Case	Mateo Zaccardo	Episode: "Sandhogs"
2008	Chuck	Bad Guy #1	Episode: "Chuck Versus the Break-Up"
2009	Trust Me	Male Masseur	Episode: "Promises, Promises"
2010	CSI: NY	Troy Picozzi	Episode: "Point of View"
2011	NCIS	Doug Fisher	Episode: "Ships in the Night"
2011	The Vampire Diaries	Maddox	Recurring Cast: Season 2
2011	The Closer	Deputy Sheriff Mike Burton	Episode: "Fresh Pursuit"
2011	Unleashed	Daniel Simmons	Recurring Cast
2011	Hawaii Five-0	Vitor Boriero	Episode: "Ka Hakaka Maika'i"
2012	The Mentalist	James Barca	Episode: "Cheap Burgundy"
2012	NCIS: Los Angeles	Navy Chief Petty Officer Green	Episode: "Vengeance"
2012	Common Law	Ted Houseman	Episode: "Soul Mates"
2012	Franklin & Bash	Sal Gotelli	Episode: "Voir Dire"
2013	The Client List	Buddy	Episode: "Wild Nights Are Calling"
2014	Grimm	Dread	Episode: "Eyes of the Beholder"
2014	Rush	Ted Cummings	Episode: "Pilot"
2014	JustBoobs Sketch	-	Episode: "Guys Getting Pregnant"
2014	Dallas	George Tatangelo	Recurring Cast: Season 3
2014	NCIS: New Orleans	Max Wolf	Episode: "The Recruits"
2016	Lethal Weapon	Daryl Hennicky	Episode: "Pilot"
2016–18	Shades of Blue	James Nava	Recurring Cast: Season 1 & 3, Main Cast: Season 2
2018–19	9-1-1	Sal Deluca	Recurring Cast: Season 2
2019	Ambitions	Greg Peters	Recurring Cast
2020	Chicago P.D.	Eric McKenzie	Guest Cast: Season 7-8
2021	Bull	Hank Alston	Episode: "Snatchback"
2025	Daredevil: Born Again	Viktor	2 episodes
