= 10 Attitudes =

- Cover of 2004 DVD release
- Directed by: Michael Gallant
- Story by: Michael Gallant; Jason Stuart
- Produced by: Rob Bonet; Michael Gallant; Jason Stuart
- Starring: Jason Stuart; Jim J. Bullock; Christopher Cowan; David Faustino; Sean Kanan; Alexandra Paul; Judy Tenuta
- Cinematography: Michael Gallant; Martin Luecke
- Edited by: Alan Roberts
- Music by: David Benoit
- Production company: Modern Artists Productions
- Distributed by: Culture Q Connection; Ariztical Entertainment (DVD)
- Release date: November 23, 2004 (US)
- Running time: 87 minutes
- Country: United States

10 Attitudes is a 2004 direct-to-video, improvised, gay romantic comedy film that stars Jason Stuart, who also improvised the story with Michael O. Gallant (credited as Michael Gallant). Gallant directed the film and co-produced it with Rob Bonet and Stuart. The film was shown at film festivals and then released on home video by Ariztical Entertainment on November 23, 2004. After ending his ten-year relationship, a 30-ish gay West Hollywood caterer must either find his perfect match within ten dates or return to his hometown. The film received mixed reviews.

== Plot ==
Gay West Hollywood caterer Josh Stevens (Jason Stuart), who is in his 30s, ends his ten-year relationship with his partner Lyle (Rusty Updegraff) who cheats on him with a 19-year-old Todd (Ben Crowley). Josh's friend Brendon (Christopher Cowan) makes a wager with newly single Josh to either find a suitable partner within ten dates or return to his hometown Cleveland, Ohio.

Josh assumes his first suitor Jimmy (Michael Lee Haring) has been using drugs when Jimmy quickly returns from a restroom. Josh's second date Bryce (Scott Kennedy) gives him a magazine filled with Bryce's writings on celebrities' faces, including Bryce's circles on heterosexual male celebrities whom Bryce admires. The third suitor Billy (David Faustino) wants to involve Josh in a threesome proposed by Billy's girlfriend, which Josh rejects. The fourth suitor whom Josh briefly dates at a Los Angeles Pride parade is a US Marine soldier and a circuit boy. Josh visits the apartment of his fifth date, who apparently wants a one-night stand. (Note: Most of the scenes of Josh's fifth suitor did not make the final cut. See #Production.)

The sixth suitor goes to gay bathhouses, which Josh does not want to experience. The seventh suitor Steven (Hilliard Guess) angrily scolds a bartender for putting a lemon slice in Steven's drink instead of the lime he requested, and throws a lemon at the bartender, prompting Josh to end the date. The eighth suitor "does nothing but talk about himself". The ninth suitor Leo (Joey Vieira), a hustler whom Josh met at group therapy sessions, reveals his dark past to Josh and, after their first date, has sex with Josh, going against Josh's wish to date more, making Josh feel regretful and feel like one of Leo's escorts.

After several dates, Josh's tenth-and-final suitor Nick (Scott Larson) at first seems to be a perfect match after their several dates, but Nick does not show up for the latest date. Josh is unaware of Nick's active marriage with his wife and that Nick is having an affair with a drag queen. Depressed, Josh becomes intoxicated for the whole night.

The following week, after his ten failed dates, Josh decides to return to Cleveland for a while. At a train station, he encounters his former schoolmate Jack Langford (Fritz Greve), who also bullied Josh in high school and is also going to Cleveland. Jack then reveals himself as gay by telling Josh he ended his own relationship with a boyfriend. When walking to the train to Cleveland, Jack admits his guilt for the pain he caused Josh and asks Josh how to make up for his past actions.

== Cast and characters ==
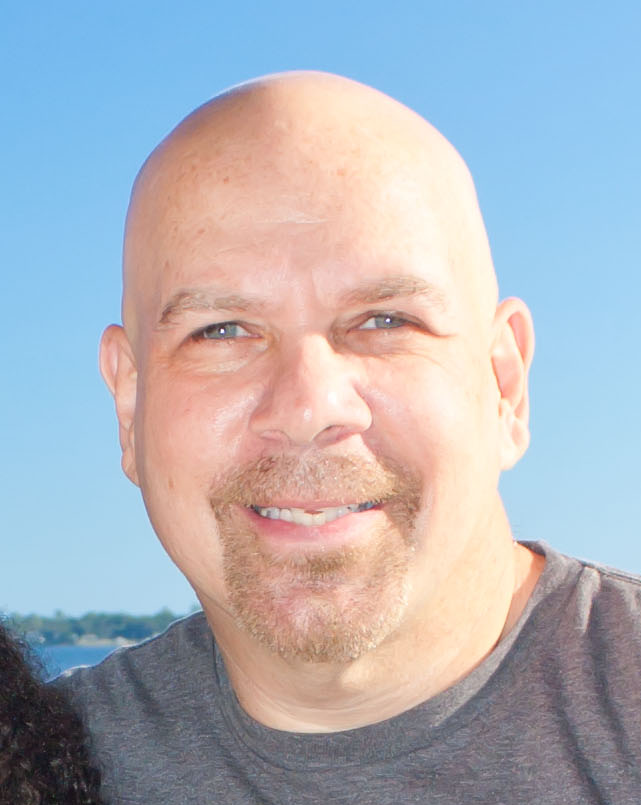
Actor Jason Stuart (pictured in 2010), also one of film producers and one of story improvisers, portrays the film's main character Josh Stevens.

- Jason Stuart as Josh Stevens, a caterer and main character of the film
  - Joseph Cohen as young Josh in October 1979
- Jim J. Bullock as "Tex", an owner of a fashion retail store
- Christopher Cowan as Brandon, Josh's friend
- Fritz Greve as adult Jack Langford, Josh's former bully
  - Mat Botuchus as young Jack in October 1979
- Sean Kanan as Craig, a bar patron
- Lydia Nicole as Claire, Josh's friend and colleague
- Alexandra Paul as Leslie, Josh's sister
- Judy Tenuta as Glenda, therapist of Josh's group therapy sessions

=== The 10 Attitudes ===
- Michael Lee Haring as Jimmy (#1)
- Scott Kennedy as Bryce (#2)
- David Faustino as Billy (#3)
- David Scott Bayer as Chad (#4), a US Marine soldier
- Bryan Shyne as Ryan (#5)
- Fabrice Tasendo as Jean-Luc (#6)
- Hilliard Guess as Steven (#7)
- Tony Rasmussen as Marty (#8)
- Joey Vieira as Leo (#9), a hustler
- Scott Larson as Nick (#10)

== Production ==
The film's "Behind the Scenes" bonus feature, narrated by director Michael Gallant and actor Jason Stuart, reveal the film is mostly unscripted and improvised. Stuart did not know much about the other characters' backgrounds and what would happen next, and that some scenes were re-filmed. The deleted scenes and outtakes of Josh's fifth suitor Ryan (Bryan Shyne), a personal trainer, show Josh explaining his romantic background to Ryan during their training sessions; Ryan invites Josh to his apartment and Ryan massages him on a massage table in the apartment.

== Release ==
10 Attitudes was screened at several LGBT film festivals. As part of the 2001 Philadelphia International Gay and Lesbian Film Festival, it had one screening at Wilma Theater on July 10, 2001. It also had one screening on September 4, 2001, as part of the 14th Annual Austin Gay & Lesbian International Film Festival. The film was shown on September 14, 2002, as part of the second annual Indianapolis Gay & Lesbian Film Festival, where actor Jason Stuart performed a pre-film stand-up show and hosted a reception reserved for festival pass holders.

10 Attitudes won the Best Picture Award at the 2002 Barcelona International Gay and Lesbian Film Festival. The film was then released direct to DVD on November 23, 2004. It then was screened as part of the 2006 Out In Africa South African Gay and Lesbian Film Festival.

== Critical reception ==
In December 2004, Stonewall News Northwest reviewer Christopher Lawrence criticized the acting and improvisation in 10 Attitudes as "border[line] shallow"; he also criticized the sound quality and the use of "home video camera" cinematography. Lawrence praised the appearances of Jason Stuart, Judy Tenuta, and then-newcomer Christopher Cowan, whom Lawrence characterized as "charmingly sweet and more convincing than most of the other men". The same year, Filmcritic.com writer Don Willmott rated the film three stars out of five, criticizing the film for exaggerating clichés of West Hollywood's gay dating scene and its "clunky ending". Willmott also criticized the film production as rushed.

The Independent Critic writer Richard Propes graded 10 Attitudes "B+" and awarded it three-and-a-half stars out of four, calling it "enjoyable" despite being one of the "quirky, bad films". Propes also called the ending "refreshing and well written". In 2016, Pride Source writer Don Calamia criticized the film as "predictable", writing "the story is far too familiar" and irrelevant to those living outside West Hollywood. Calamia also criticized the main protagonist's potential suitors as "recycled jerks", having already been done in other films, and the exaggeration of West-Hollywood clichés. Calamia concluded his review by saying its " 'O. Henry’-ish ending ... is about the most original aspect of the story, but ultimately, it works only if you believe in fairy tales".
