= Air Force One Is Down =

TV series or program

- Story by: Alistair MacLean
- Directed by: Cilla Ware
- Starring: Jeremy Sisto; Jamie Thomas King; Emilie de Raven; Rupert Graves; Ken Duken; Linda Hamilton
- Countries of origin: Luxembourg; United Kingdom; United States
- Original language: English

Production
- Running time: 171 minutes
- Production company: Sonar Entertainment

Air Force One Is Down is a 2013 two-part action television miniseries loosely based on a story by Alistair MacLean that was improvised on a 1981 novel by John Denis. The film stars Jeremy Sisto, Jamie Thomas King, Emilie de Ravin, Rupert Graves, Ken Duken and Linda Hamilton.

== Plot ==
=== Episode I ===
Fergus Markey (Sisto) is given a flashback of children who were killed by an infamous mass-murderer by the name of Arkady Dragutin, and decides to avenge them. When he arrives in front of Dragutin's safe house, he is denied access. He and his allies breach the property, leading to an instant gunfight. Meanwhile, a black vehicle is on the loose, using decoys as defense. Despite this, Markey manages to catch up and arrest Dragutin. At Dragutin's trial in The Hague, the judge sentences him to life imprisonment as a punishment for masterminding wars in the process of creating a so-called "Greater Serbia." A furious Dragutin vows to "rip the heart out of Europe".

The U.S. president Harriet Rowntree is scheduled for a flight to Serbia to discuss their negotiations with NATO. At the Russian Embassy in London, the Russian defense minister Dimitri Kozinski insists Serbia has legal rights to join NATO. Channel 7 news reporter Francesca Romero (alias of her real name Nadia Sierri) is having conversation with Steven Featherstone (King). A woman named Irene Burak warns him Kozinski may be executed by the FSB, due to a strong connection with the Western world. The two enter a parking lot, but are ambushed an unidentified black vehicle, and Burak is taken away. Dragutin does a stealth-method conversation with his right-hand Milosz Petrovic (Duken) in Maryland that everything is going as "planned".

At the Air Force Base in Washington, a maintenance man inserts radioactive tanks onto the landing gear compartment. Romero boards the aircraft minutes from departure. In a small town in Serbia, Markey and other men are breaching Petrovic's residency. However, once they search for him, Markey realizes the men are allies of Petrovic, but are silently taken out.

Dragutin does a "mental" connection with his hideout base in Serbia, where an Englishman is forced to digitally hijack large aircraft. Up in the air, Air Force One is under outside control and is dropped to 3000 feet. Passengers on board the aircraft put on their oxygen masks, but the radioactive tanks put them to sleep. However, Romero stays awake after she loses her grip on her phone. With Market and Featherstone in front of the airstrip, the aircraft arrives, and a group of cars quickly kidnap the President and Romero as the latter tries to sneak away. With them out of the aircraft, Petrovic sends it back up in the air to destroy it at open waters, witnessed by units of Fast Eagle One.

The President regains consciousness at the hideout, and Petrovic orders a man to execute Romero, but she manages to distract him and escape death. She discovers where the President is held and storms into her cell. Markey and Featherstone sneak into the hideout and find the two. The president realizes Petrovic captured her in order to exchange her for Dragutin. The four attempt to the flee the base, but only Markey manages to do so. Petrovic sends a video tape the government and hands them a deal to release Dragutin within 12 hours and Rowntree will be released "unharmed". Markey tries to notify Whitehall that he knows the President's whereabouts. The government agrees to Petrovic's offer, but the President is hidden inside a house surrounded by mines. Featherstone and Romero manage to rescue her, and Dragutin is released in the open, but is removed from radar as he removes a transmitter device implanted in his arm. The President loses consciousness after she accidentally destabilized a mine wire, and Featherstone and Romero are taken back to the base. A missile explodes onto the surface of Markey's open location, watched by Dragutin.

=== Episode II ===
Featherstone and Romero struggle to escape a flooding well, but Markey rescues them. Another aircraft is hijacked by Petrovic, being witnessed by the three. Featherstone realizes he is on the assassination list, because he would have the chance to spread the news of Kozinski having the ability to gain power from the West. The President wakes up with a concussion inside the US Military Hospital in Germany. Sierri informs Kozinski that someone in FSB blew her cover, and are therefore assisting Dragutin, putting Kozinski's life in jeopardy, but he orders her to stay where they are.

Markey heads for the base to arrest Dragutin as revenge for the ones he was supposed to protect under the war, because him and the United Nations did no intervention. The U.S. military receive the hideout's coordinates, but Dragutin and Petrovic are moving out. Featherstone and Sierri locate the hacker (by the name Mackenzie). He takes over the aircraft on Featherstone's will, but receives a video tape by Dragutin, surmised to be on the Russian aircraft heading to destroy London as a revenge for NATO destroying Belgrade. Mackenzie succeeds in destroying the aircraft, but is murdered by a rocket launcher from behind. However, the military ambush the hideout, Petrovic is killed and the colonel assures Dragutin is dead, and the trio says goodbye to each other.

In the Kremlin, Kozinski decides to hand Nadia a vacation to Rome, and Featherstone boards a rebuilt Air Force One at Heathrow Airport. However, his boss Barry mentions he never would (nor did he want to) appear in Washington or London being employed in Rome. The three meet each other in Rome by coincidence, and Markey reveals Dragutin is still alive. He brought a picture of the Sistine Chapel which is Dragutin's target. In the meantime, Dragutin plants a nuclear bomb underground, but Markey yells to Dragutin he wants to be taken hostage. Dragutin leaves for a chopper, but Markey has disarmed Dragutin's detonator, by replacing the bomb inside Dragutin's switch, guarantees him to be dead. Sierri is back at the Kremlin, and brought evidence from Dragutin's pocket, which reveals Dragutin had direct contact with Kozinski. As a result, he is out of office and arrested, as well as Barry who have been received orders from Kozinski, by the quote of Dragutin; "for an old friend's sake". The trio end up in Rome for a real vacation with their own plans; Fergus on rugby finale, Featherstone on opera, and Nadia with a lesbian friend.

== Main cast ==
- Jeremy Sisto as Fergus Markey, a former Irish military agent
- Emilie de Ravin as Francesca Romero / Nadia Sierri, a Russian agent of FSB
- Jamie Thomas King as Steven Featherstone
- Rupert Graves as Arkady Dragutin, the leader of the "Greater Serbia" army
- Ken Duken as Milosz Petrovic, Dragutin's right hand
- Carsten Norgaard as Defence Minister in Russia
- Linda Hamilton as U.S. President Harriet Rowntree
- Jamie Treacher as John Mackenzie, an English computer professional and the hacker of Air Force One

== Production ==
The project was first conceived for television in the late 1970s. MacLean wrote up the story as a 120-page novella about Air Force One being hijacked while hosting a number of oil company executives. Don Sharp was going to make it for Warner Bros and scouted locations in Yugoslavia but then Warner Bros pulled out. The project was turned down by NBC who did not want to make something about terrorism at the time. After The Hostage Tower was made it was revived as a proposed telemovie in 1980 but production was postponed.

== Reception ==
The German website TV Spielfilm criticised the plot and acting and found the series had little to do with the original books. Filmdienst too was very negative about the film, stating, "Intricate action thriller with lots of twists and turns that at least partially distract from the absurdity of the plot. The stereotypical images of the enemy and the television budget that contradict the claimed effort are disturbing." A similar assessment can be found at TV Today. Ultimately, poorly choreographed action scenes, low budget special effects and props, lack of trained stunt doubles and mediocre performances detract from the classic original story and a strong main cast.
