= Jason Stuart =

American actor and comedian (born 1969)

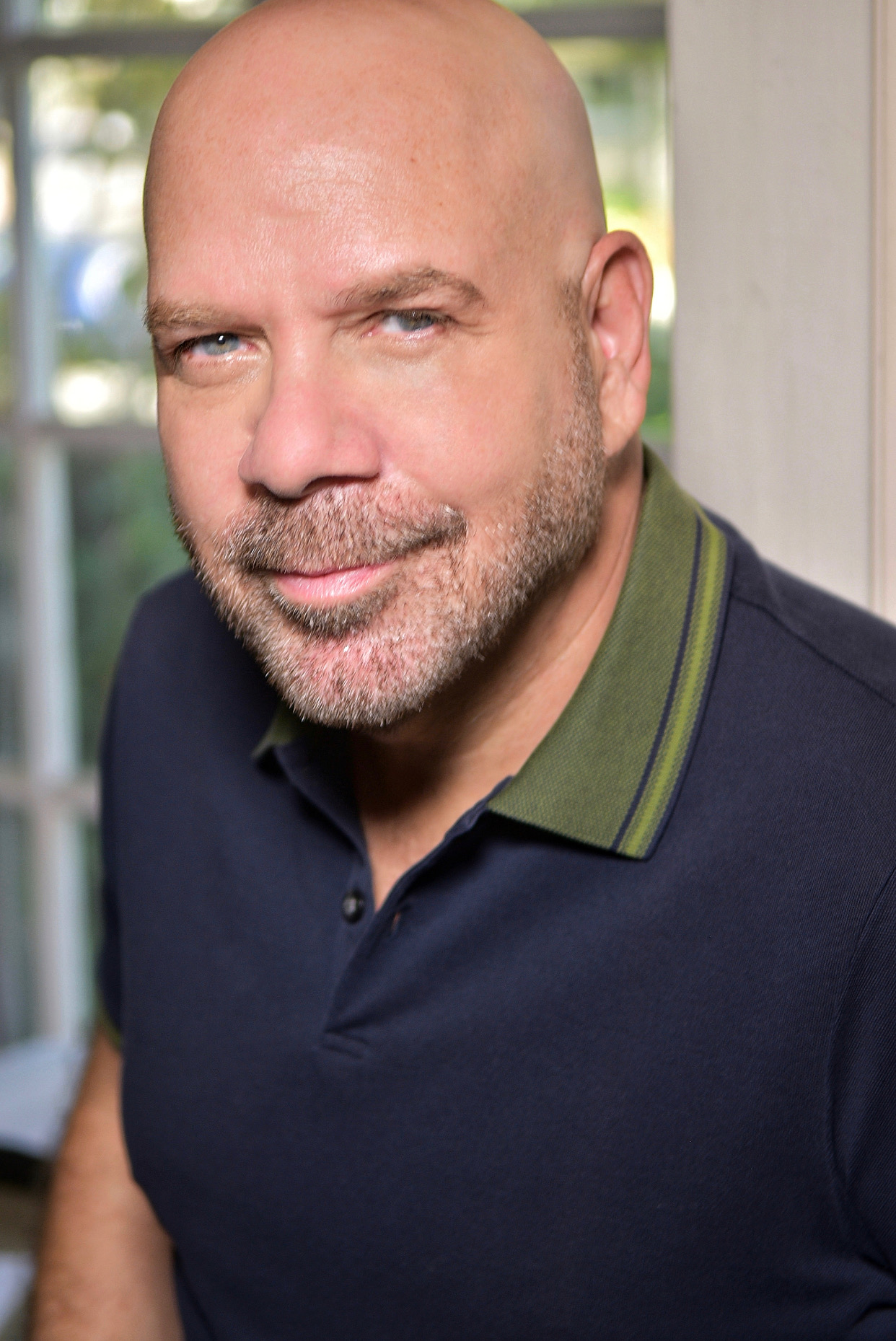
- Jason Stuart - 2019
- Born: Stuart Ted Greif; January 13, 1969 (age 57); The Bronx, New York City, New York, United States
- Occupations: Actor; comedian; talk show host; television personality
- Website: jasonstuart.com

Jason Stuart (born January 13, 1969), also known by his real name Stuart Ted Greif, is an American actor and comedian. He first won notice on Star Search, where he lost to Martin Lawrence. He came out publicly in 1993 on the syndicated daytime talk show Geraldo, and has been called "the first openly gay stand-up comedian" by various media outlets (a title Stuart himself rejects).

== Early life ==
Stuart Ted Greif was born in The Bronx, New York, on January 13, 1969, and raised in Los Angeles, California.

His father Leonard Greif was Jewish and born in Poland. Leonard was only 10 years old when Nazi Germany invaded Poland. Jason's grandmother saw her best friends shot to death, and forced her family to flee even as other Jews and Poles argued that the Nazi occupation wouldn't be that bad. Leonard and his parents spent the war on the run, being hidden by Christian families. Jason's grandmother later learned that the rest of her family had been murdered.

Jason's father emigrated to the United States in 1949. Barely able to speak English, he got a job as a janitor. Jason's mother, Gloria, was born in Brooklyn in New York City. She was 17 years old when she married 22-year-old Leonard Greif. Leonard later got a job cutting ties from cloth in the New York City garment industry, and Gloria became a beautician.

The Greifs had three children: Steven, Stuart, and Karen. The family moved to the Fairfax neighborhood in central Los Angeles, California, when Jason was a year old. Jason Stuart describes his family as "not religious, but culturally Jewish." Jason Stuart says that his father and paternal grandparents suffered from post-traumatic stress syndrome, leaving them constantly angry and afraid. Both parents, he says, had outsize egos and refused to let anyone interrupt or silence them. In Los Angeles, Leonard obtained a job with Castle Neckwear, and eventually rose to the position of vice president. He later became wealthy investing in real estate.

As a closeted gay youth, Jason Stuart says he felt alienated from his dysfunctional family. His father, he says, was more focused on making money than on showing his children love. However, his father's focus on putting one's best self forward in business left Jason with a desire to always be true to himself. His mother inspired him to be an artist, and he began performing at the local Jewish community center when he was eight years old. He began taking acting seriously in junior high.

Jason Stuart was heavily bullied throughout his childhood for his perceived homosexuality. He developed a quick wit and sense of humor because he was terrified and because it was an effective defensive mechanism, "so they could laugh with me rather than at me," he later said. Being funny was also a way to express his feelings, even if they were hidden by irony or sarcasm.

Although he was always making jokes growing up, Stuart says he was despondent. "When I was a kid, everyone thought I was jovial, funny. But I was one of those suicidal kids who went to sleep wishing I wouldn't wake up."

Stuart was chubby as a child, standing 5 feet 9 inches (1.75 m) tall and weighing 250 pounds (110 kg). He was attacked several times in junior high school after his peers assumed he was gay. The word "fag" was written on his locker, a girl punched him in the face (for which he was hospitalized), and another student beat him until he was unconscious. (Note: Stuart says he told no one about the writing on his locker. He looked at it every day for three years.)

As a child, Stuart was impressed by sarcastic and self-deprecating comedians such as Lucille Ball, Totie Fields, Paul Lynde, John Ritter, and Lily Tomlin. He also found actors Whoopi Goldberg, Dustin Hoffman, and Barbra Streisand inspiring. Streisand appealed to him most. He saw her in the film Funny Girl, and her "sad on the inside, funny on the outside" character seemed to mirror his own life.

Stuart's parents divorced when he was 17, and he left home a year later. Both parents later remarried (his mother had 4 partners in total).

== Career ==
=== Early acting career ===
Lacking any connections in the entertainment industry, Stuart called every agent listed in the Players Directory (a directory of talent and casting agents, published twice a year). He had a head shot taken, and sent the photograph to the producer of every television show he liked.

His first acting gig was as an extra on the comedy series One Day at a Time in 1977. He played a student, and had to exit through a door. He was so nervous that not only did he slam the wrong door, but he slammed the door so hard that its molding fell off.

Stuart supported himself by taking a wide range of odd jobs. He also took acting classes and studied under such prestigious teachers as Nina Foch, Harvey Lembeck, Roy London, Allan Miller, and Lawrence Parke. His first credited role on television came on the syndicated series The Life and Times of Eddie Roberts in 1980.

Stuart struggled to find work, however. Casting directors told him that he came across too gay and that no one would hire him. His agents did not know what parts they should have him audition for.

=== Early stand-up career ===
With acting gigs not forthcoming, Stuart's agent suggested in the early 1980s that he try stand-up comedy instead. Although he received neither encouragement nor financial assistance from his parents, he began a career as a professional comedian in 1983. He began touring in 1985.

Numerous comedy club gigs followed, and soon Stuart was headlining at mainstream venues. By 1987, Stuart was considered a major comedy star. That year, he appeared on the nationally syndicated talent show Star Search. Judges voted him superior to three other comedians, but Stuart lost in the fourth showdown to Martin Lawrence.

=== Post-coming out ===
Stuart came out publicly in the spring of 1993. His comedy act consisted of him acting heterosexual, even though he dressed outrageously or androgynously. He grew increasingly unhappy with his act, feeling he was lying to his audiences about who he was. Stuart realized he needed to come out while leading a class on self-esteem for young performers. After being heckled one day for coming off too effeminate, he told the heckler "I'm not gonna let you make me feel bad for being myself." When the teacher thanked him after the class for saying that, he realized he needed to come out professionally.

He first came out in early 1993 to an audience at The Laff Stop in Houston, Texas. Shortly thereafter, Geraldo Rivera invited him to appear in a segment on "Unconventional Comedians" on his nationally syndicated talk show Geraldo. Stuart not only came out of the closet during the show, but kissed Rivera on the air. Coming out made Stuart one of earliest openly gay comedians to be performing nationally, and according to journalist Connor Keaney he was widely said to be the first openly gay stand-up comedian. Stuart himself says such claims are inaccurate.

Stuart has described being an openly gay comedian in the 1990s as fraught with difficulties. He feared that coming out would cost him his day-job, and he was constantly aware that homophobes might physically attack him on stage or as he left the club. He worried that doing pre-show publicity would draw attention from those who might do him harm. Four times, he was picketed by members of the virulently homophobic Westboro Baptist Church. Bookers and other comedians would make fun of his sexuality, or openly harass him to get him to quit. Hosts would introduce him to audiences in crass or offensive ways.

In June 1994, Stuart performed his act on Broadway at the Town Hall theatre in OUTrageous Comedy '94, a benefit for the Gay Games hosted by Sandra Bernhard. He continued to do small roles on television, appearing on The John Larroquette Show, Murder, She Wrote, and seaQuest DSV, among others, but many casting directors openly refused to hire a gay man (and told him so to his face).

Stuart performed for more than 100,000 people at the Millennium March on Washington in 2000. He appeared on the groundbreaking comedy Will & Grace in 2000, and reprised his role in 2002. He released his first comedy album, Gay Comedy Without A Dress, in 2001.

In 2002, Stuart had what was described as a semi-regular role playing a gay therapist on the Damon Wayans comedy My Wife and Kids.

Stuart wrote, produced, and starred in his first film, 10 Attitudes in 2004. The same year, he appeared on House. His first televised comedy special, Jason Stuart: Making It to the Middle, aired on the Here TV cable network in 2005. A year later, he appeared in the comedy crime film Puff, Puff, Pass and was nominated for a Gay International Film Award for Best Supporting Actor for his role in the 2006 independent film Coffee Date. 2008 saw him guesting on Everybody Hates Chris, and in 2009 he appeared on the television series The Closer, in a gay-themed remake of The Pit and the Pendulum, on Logo TV's comedy series One Night Stand-Up, and an episode of the comedy series It's Always Sunny in Philadelphia.

By 2010, Stuart was one of the most in-demand character actors in the United States, and was a favorite of casting directors who wanted a gay or sexually ambiguous performance.

=== Refocus on dramatic acting ===
After spending two decades primarily as a stand-up comedian, Stuart decided to refocus his career on acting in 2012. After learning about the tax breaks that some U.S. states offer production companies, he hired an agent in each of these states and began auditioning nationwide. He portrayed the officiant who marries John Lithgow and Alfred Molina in the critically lauded 2014 film Love is Strange, and appeared in the highly praised 2015 independent feature Tangerine, an innovative production shot with three iPhone 5S smartphones. That same year, he had a guest shot on the TV series Sleepy Hollow, and toured the country with a new stand-up show, I'm Only Gay on the Weekends. The show found a permanent home for a year at the Purple Room, a Palm Springs supper club and jazz venue.

Stuart found his most prominent role to date in the 2016 dramatic period film The Birth of a Nation. In the motion picture, a fictionalized version of Nat Turner's slave rebellion, Stuart plays Joseph Randall, a white, racist plantation owner and rapist. He was deeply disturbed by the racism and violence in the screenplay, leading him to only read it through once. To prepare for the film, Stuart read books on slavery in the Antebellum South and worked for a week perfecting his scenes with actor friends. Stuart told San Diego Jewish World that the role was life-changing, and he rededicated himself to being honest and truthful in his performances. Stuart says it is his favorite role.

In January 2019, Stuart's streaming independent comedy series Smothered premiered. Co-created and co-written with co-star Mitch Hara, the series is about two gay Jewish men who have been married for 30 years but now find their relationship falling apart. Unable to get a divorce for financial reasons, the neurotic men struggle to find an accommodation. Stuart and Hara were both nominated for Best Digital Performance and Smothered for Best Series at the 2021 Queerty Awards. In April 2022, Stuart won the award for Best Actor in a Comedy at the Indie Series Awards. A second season of Smothered began airing on Amazon Prime in the fall of 2022. Stuart also starred as the title character in the 2019 short film Hank, and had a small role in the 2019 independent fantasy anthology film Immortal.

Stuart published his autobiography, Shut Up, I'm Talking: Coming Out in Hollywood and Making It to the Middle, in late 2019. The title of the book came from a phrase his mother repeatedly said while he was growing up.

As of March 2021, Jason Stuart had more than 150 acting credits. That year, he appeared in an episode of the streaming legal drama Goliath, That month, he released his second comedy album, I'm the Daddy and I Have Candy.

== Labor activism ==
Jason Stuart is a member of the performers' union SAG-AFTRA. He co-founded and co-chairs the union's National LGBT Actors Committee, the union's first committee for LGBT people. Stuart was one of those who excoriated journalist Ramin Setoodeh during the Newsweek gay actor controversy. Setoodeh argued in his magazine piece that audiences do not accept openly LGBTQ actors in heterosexual roles. Stuart called Setoodeh's argument "wrongheaded" and said it "sends a damaging and false message that we are limited in the roles we are able to play. ... Unfortunately, harmful attitudes like those of Setoodeh are used to pressure actors to stay in the closet. Our work is clearly not done, and we will continue to fight to end fear within the acting community that being open about who you are means the end of your career. I'm an actor; it's not who I am but what I can play that counts."

In his role as LGBT Committee co-chair, Stuart was the moderator of the first Transgender Actor Panel at the Outfest LGBTQ-oriented film festival in Los Angeles in 2015. Panelists included Alexandra Billings, D'Lo, and Mya Taylor.

In June 2019, Stuart and other members of the SAG-AFTRA LGBT Committee marched as a contingent at the NYC Pride March.

== Personal life ==
Stuart was raised Jewish, but says his family was more observant of tradition than it was religious. As an adult, he identifies as a secular Jew.

Stuart says he relies on his memories of family for a good deal of his comedy act. Stuart is "guardedly friendly" with his older brother and half-siblings from his father's second marriage, but estranged from his younger sister. Leonard Greif died in 2012.

Stuart was single as of 2019. He told an interviewer that year: "I've been a complete failure in every relationship so there's nowhere to go but up!"

== Filmography ==
=== Film ===
Year	Title	Role	Notes
1984	The Lost Empire	Gay Dude	
1987	Cross My Heart	Waiter	
1987	P.A.N.I.C in Griffith Park	Dean	
1990	Kindergarten Cop	Male Hairstylist	
1990	Eternity	James Harris News Team	
1990	Road Lawyers and Other Briefs	Man / Woman / Flight Attendant (segment "Hairline")	
1995	Doin' It Right	Brother	
1995	Cyber Bandits	Street Vendor	
1997	Vegas Vacation	Buffet Guy	
1998	Southern Man	Joseph Ogle	
1999	Sam and Mike	Man at Party	
1999	Lost & Found	Jewelry Store Manager	
2000	Get Your Stuff	Jason	
2000	Flamingo Dreams	Porn Director	
2001	Long Road to Paradise	The Waiter	
2001	10 Attitudes	Josh Stevens	
2002	Dawg	Photographer	
2002	Role of a Lifetime	Phillip	
2004	Space	Businessman	
2004	A Day Without a Mexican	Restaurant Manager	
2004	What Adam Knows	Bradshaw	
2005	Gone Postal	Carl	
2005	Ghosts Never Sleep	Barry Speer	
2006	Coffee Date	Clayton	
2006	Puff, Puff, Pass	Chet	
2007	Ping Pong Playa	Doctor	
2007	Angels with Dirty Spaces	Bob Kamen	
2008	The Candlelight Murders	David Wid	
2008	Friends & Lovers: The Ski Trip 2	Richard	
2008	San Saba	Dylan Clay	
2008	Twisted Faith	Father Reilly	
2009	The Chronicles of Holly-Weird	Leo	
2009	The Pit and the Pendulum	Dimitri Divay	
2009	Wild About Harry	Randolph	
2009	My Lil Homo: Campers Unite	Lil Jason Stuart	
2009	Family of Four	Nurse Nathan	
2009	Split Second	Officer Leonard	
2010	Drop Dead Gorgeous	Tim Honda	
2010	Gay Baby	Darryl	
2011	Part-Time Pool Guys	Owner	
2011	Finding Mr. Wright	Phillip	
2011	Walk a Mile in My Pradas	Dr. Feist	
2011	Monkey Man	Demetrius Delmonico	
2011	The Stand-In	Brian	
2012	Posey	Mark	
2012	Stigma	Counselor Fred	
2012	K-11	Prison Laundry Trustee	
2012	BearCity 2: The Proposal	Scott-O	
2013	Glitter and Ribs	Taylor Swift's Boyfriend	
2013	Big Gay Love	Dan#2	
2013	Goodbye World	Apartment Manager	
2014	The Spy Who Came to Brunch	Operations Director ("G")	
2014	Paper Hearts	Lenny	
2014	Secrets & Toys	Lord of Leather	
2014	Love Is Strange	Officiant	
2015	Tangerine	Joey the Doorman	
2015	Hush Up Sweet Charlotte	Mr. Wills	
2015	Suburban Memoir	Mr. H	
2015	Baby Steps	Dr. Schwartz	
2016	Dirty	Manny Brown	
2016	The Birth of a Nation	Joseph Randall	
2016	Gone: VR 360	Francis	
2017	Viva Diva	Steven	
2017	The Heart of a Woman	Giles Finch	
2017	The Guest House	Ray	
2017	Open	Weeper	
2017	Like Father	Lenny	
2018	The Line	Carl	
2018	Face Off	Lucky	
2018	Jinn	Victor Chase	
2019	American Bistro	Sheldon Crassus	
2019	The Infiltrators	Agent Jensen	
2019	The Fare	The Dispatcher	
2019	Abducted	Detective Walter	
2019	Hank	Hank	
2022	Myra	Baurb Sampson	
2023	Discovering Ella	Charles	
2023	Immortal	Joe	
2023	Breaking The Rules	Bobby	
2024	Garlic Parmasean	Improv Dad	
2025	I Got Next	Coach McMillian	
2025	Blackwood	Lyle	
2026	Redlining	Andrew	

=== Television ===
Year	Title	Role	Notes
1980	The Life and Times of Eddie Roberts	Smith	TV series, 1 episode
1984	Out of Control	Dog butler	TV series, 1 episode
1985	Michael Nesmith in Television Parts	Young Taylor	TV series, 1 episode
1986	Can You Feel Me Dancing?	DeeJay	(TV movie)
1987	Roses Are for the Rich	D.J.	Mini Series, 1 episodes
1988	Superior Court	Murray Decater	TV series, 1 episode
1989	CBS Summer Playhouse	(unknown)	TV series, 1 episode
1990-1992	Sunset Beat	Marty	TV series, 2 episodes
1991	N.Y. Mounted	Vincent	(TV movie)
1993	This Just In	Hairdresser	TV series, 1 episode
1993	The John Larroquette Show	Chris	TV series, 1 episode
1993	Murder, She Wrote	Motel Manager	TV series, 1 episode
1994	SeaQuest 2032	Motivational Speaker	TV series, 1 episode
1996	Don't Quit Your Day Job	Stand-Up Performances No. 20	(Video Game)
1996	L.A. Firefighters	Janitor	TV series, 1 episode
1997	Murder One	Barry Pruitt	TV series, 1 episode
1998	Charmed	Martin	TV series, 1 episode
1998	The Drew Carey Show	Chip	TV series, 1 episode
1998	Gia	Booker No. 2	(TV movie)
2000	Norm	Dennis	TV series, 1 episode
2000	Providence	Stage Manager	TV series, 1 episode
2000-2001	The Huntress	Barry (2000)/ 911 Operator No. 2 (2001)	TV series, 2 episodes
2000-2002	Will & Grace	Stuart	TV series, 2 episodes
2001	Me & My Needs	Karaoke Guy	(Pilot)
2001	Three Sisters	Secretary	TV series, 1 episode
2002	My Wife and Kids	Dr. Steven Michael Thomas	TV series, 4 episodes
2003	The Sausage Factory	Doctor	(Pilot)
2003	Strong Medicine	Talk Show Host	TV series, 1 episode
2004	House	Adam Brown	TV series, 1 episode
2005	Fat Actress	McG's Assistant	TV series, 1 episode
2006	George Lopez	Sales Manager	TV series, 1 episode
2007	The DL Chronicles	Sassy Customer	TV series, 1 episode
2007	Mind of Mencia	Gay Advocate	TV series, 1 episode
2007	Orlando's Bed and Breakfast	Lenny Greenbaum-Brooks	(Pilot)
2008	Everybody Hates Chris	Lonnie	TV series, 1 episode
2009	It's Always Sunny in Philadelphia	Event Manager	TV series, 1 episode
2009	The Closer	Greg Lewis	TV series, 1 episode
2009	Keep Dreaming	Mark	(Pilot)
2010	The Pink House	Judge	(Pilot)
2010	Friends & Lovers	Richard	TV series, 1 episode
2010	Warren the Ape	Ira	TV series, 1 episode
2011	America's Most Wanted: America Fights Back	Detective Hudson	TV series documentary, 1 episode
2011	Paul Cruz: Latin Actor (A Mockuseries)	Samuel	TV series, 3 episodes
2011	Entourage	Doc Hock (uncredited)	TV series, 1 episode
2012	Fumbling Thru the Pieces	Tommy	TV series, 2 episodes
2012	The Secret Life of the American Teenager	Hotel Manager	TV series, 1 episode
2012	Home Invasion	Maurice Lapeer	(TV movie)
2012	Bitter Bartender	Rodney Silverstein	TV series, 4 episodes
2013	A Dog's Life	Rich Dog (voice role)	(TV movie)
2014	Mentor	Jason	TV series 6 episodes
2014	Futurestates	Ronald Kopstein	TV series, 1 episode
2014-2015	Just Us Guys	Principal O'Dell	TV series, 1 episode
2015	Sleepy Hollow (TV series)	Curator	TV series, 1 episode
2015	Real Rob	Billy the sauna guy	TV series, 1 episode
2015	Adam Astra Casting	Jason Stuart	(Pilot)
2017	Odd Man Out: The Series	Mr. Corker	TV series, 1 episode
2017	The Mephisto Box	Anton	TV series, 1 episode
2017	Kevin Hart Presents: The Next Level	Father	TV series, 1 episode
2017	Love (2016 TV series)	Dr. Powell	TV series, 1 episode
2018	The Strivers	Frank Kaufer	(Pilot)
2018	Hilton Head Island	Raymond	TV series, 1 episode
2018	Swedish Dicks	Oscar Bustamente	TV series, 1 episode
2020	Smothered (TV series)	Ralph	TV series, 7 episode
2021	Goliath	Charles	TV series, 1 episode

|2021 ||Burbles || Various || TV series, 1 episode |} |2024 ||Becoming Karl Lagerfeld || Voice of Pierre Bergé|| TV series, 6 episodes |}
