= The Midnight Man (2016 crime film) =

- DVD cover
- Directed by: D.C. Hamilton
- Screenplay by: Brinna Kelly; D.C. Hamilton
- Produced by: Brinna Kelly
- Starring: Will Kemp; Brinna Kelly; William Forsythe; Brent Spiner; Doug Jones; Vinnie Jones; Steve Valentine; Max Adler
- Cinematography: Joshua Harrison
- Edited by: D.C. Hamilton
- Music by: Torin Borrowdale
- Production company: Midnight Man Film
- Distributed by: Cinedigm
- Release dates: March 1, 2016 (DVD and digital)
- Running time: 104 minutes
- Country: United States
- Language: English

The Midnight Man is a 2016 American direct-to-video crime thriller film starring Will Kemp, Brinna Kelly, William Forsythe, Brent Spiner, Doug Jones, Vinnie Jones, Steve Valentine, Max Adler and William Miller. Brinna Kelly also produced and co-wrote, along with director D.C. Hamilton. It was released to DVD and digitally by Cinedigm on March 1, 2016.

== Plot ==
When Grady, an assassin with a genetic disorder that renders him unable to feel pain, is sent on a high-stakes assignment, his world is turned upside-down after an attack when he awakens to discover that he can feel pain for the first time in his life. With the clock ticking and his greatest asset gone, Grady will go head-to-head with his greatest fears and unspeakable enemies, while experiencing a tactile world he never could have imagined.

== Cast ==
- Will Kemp as Grady
- Brinna Kelly as Zan
- William Forsythe as Fairbanks
- Brent Spiner as Ezekiel
- Doug Jones as Vick
- Vinnie Jones as Pearl
- Steve Valentine as The Escort
- Max Adler as Simmons
- William Miller as Nomack
- Rich Finley as Riggs
