= Alexandra Paul =

American actress and activist (b. 1963)

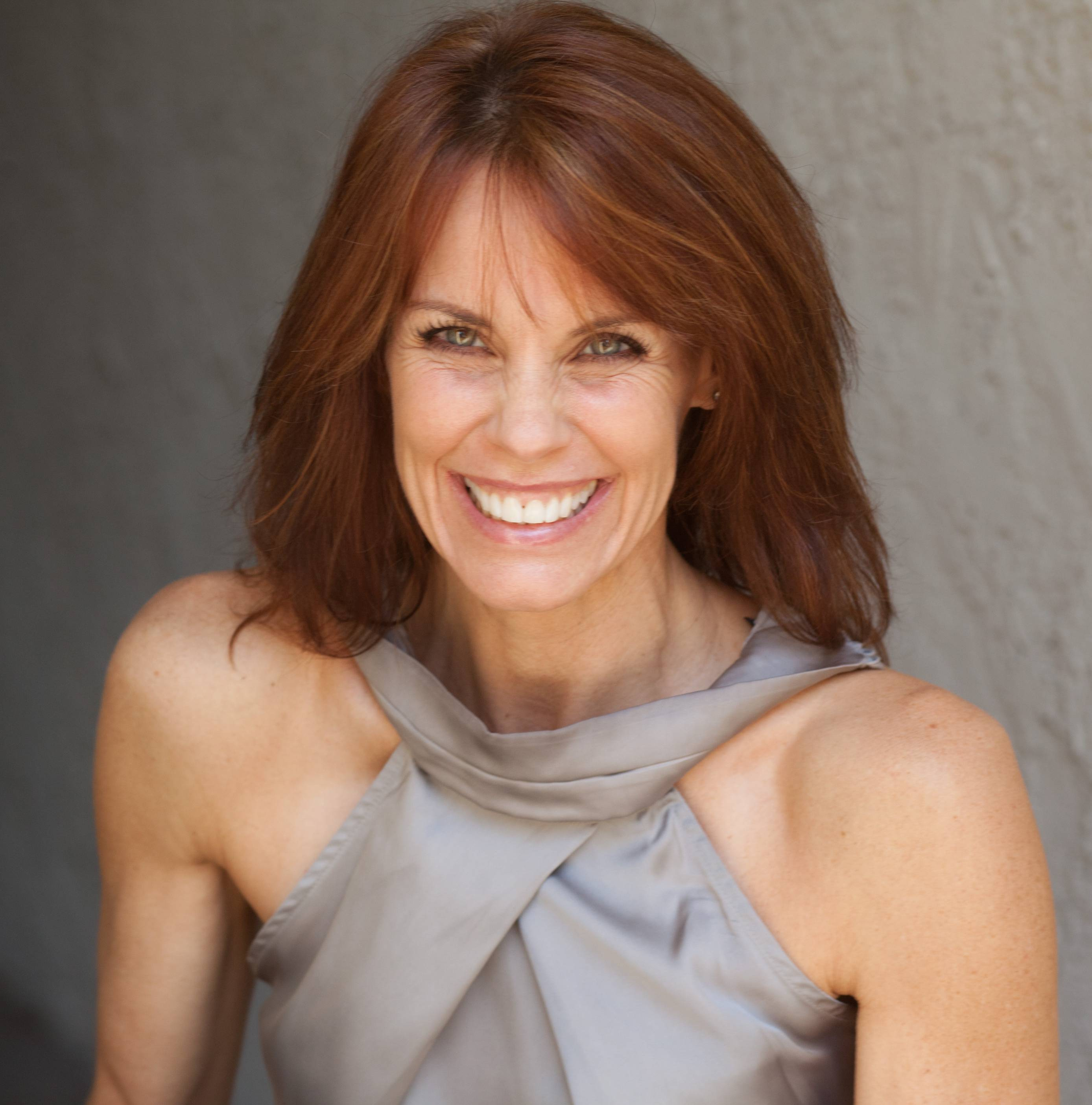
- Paul in 2012
- Born: Alexandra Elizabeth Paul; July 29, 1963 (age 63); New York City, New York, U.S.
- Citizenship: United States; United Kingdom
- Occupation: Actress
- Years active: 1979–present
- Spouse: Ian Murray (m. 2000)

Alexandra Elizabeth Paul (born July 29, 1963) is an American actress and activist. She began her career modeling in New York before landing her first major role in John Carpenter's horror film Christine (1983). This was followed with prominent roles in Just the Way You Are (1984), American Flyers (1985), 8 Million Ways to Die (1986), and Dragnet (1987). She starred as Stephanie Holden in five seasons of the television series Baywatch from (1992-97).

== Early life ==
Paul was born in New York City to Sarah, a social worker from the United Kingdom, and Mark Paul, an American investment banker. Paul was raised alongside her identical twin sister, Caroline, and younger brother, Jonathan, in the rural town of Cornwall, Connecticut. According to Paul, her mother was "a very liberal Democrat and [her] father was a very conservative Republican." Her brother, Jonathan, was an animal rights activist and is currently a wild land firefighter in Oregon. Her twin sister Caroline has been a San Francisco firefighter (where she is often mistaken as Alexandra) and best-selling author. On the set of Christine where Alexandra had a leading role, she brought in her sister for a day of film shooting; as a prank Caroline was put in full costume and makeup which fooled director John Carpenter into thinking that he was directing Alexandra.

Paul attended the Cornwall Consolidated School, and the Groton School in Massachusetts. At ages 17 and 18, Paul underwent two major abdominal operations to remove choledochal cysts, which left her with a scar spanning from her sternum to her navel. Paul was accepted into Stanford University, but chose not to attend so that she could focus on an acting career.

== Career ==
Paul worked prominently in television from the late 1980s onward, perhaps most recognizable in her starring role on Baywatch, from 1992 to 1997. Paul began her career working as a model in New York City, and later moved to Los Angeles when she decided to pursue a career in acting. Her first role was in the independent Canadian horror film American Nightmare (filmed in 1980 but released in 1983), followed by the television film Paper Dolls (1982). Paul then landed a leading role in John Carpenter's horror film Christine (1983), opposite Keith Gordon, followed by a supporting role in the comedy Just the Way You Are (1984).

She later appeared in the sport drama American Flyers (1985) with Kevin Costner, 8 Million Ways to Die (1986), and the comedy Dragnet (1987), opposite Tom Hanks and Dan Aykroyd. She also starred in the films Death Train (1993) and Nightwatch (1995) opposite Christopher Lee and Pierce Brosnan, as well as the horror films The Paperboy (1994) and Spectre (1996).

Since 1999, she has starred in 15 films for Lifetime Network. She has also starred in the Fox TV series Fire Company 132 and appeared in the last eight episodes of Melrose Place. She guest-starred on Mad Men in 2008. She hosted non-fiction TV shows, including WE's Winning Women and a southern California local environmentalism show, Earth Talk Today. She made a cameo appearance with Sacha Baron Cohen in Borat: Cultural Learnings of America for Make Benefit Glorious Nation of Kazakhstan in a deleted scene parodying her Baywatch role. She did a cameo in the comedy spoofs Spy Hard and Sharknado: The 4th Awakens.

In 2015, Paul won Indie Series' Best Supporting Actress in a comedy webseries "Mentor" starring and created by Jason Stuart & Paul Elia .

Paul co-wrote and co-produced two documentaries: Jampacked, a documentary on the world population crisis, and The Cost of Cool: Finding Happiness in a Materialistic World. Jampacked received a Bronze Apple Award and first place recognition at the EarthVision Environmental Film and Video Festival. The Cost of Cool won a 2001 CINE Golden Eagle Award. She also produced eight PSAs on the benefits of driving electric vehicles for the non-profit Plug In America.

In 2019, Paul acted in three movies, among them, Escaping My Stalker. In 2020, she appeared in four projects, and in 2022 she starred in the independent films Tethered and Baby Steps.

For six years (2019-2025), Paul co-hosted the plant based lifestyle podcast Switch4Good with Olympian Dotsie Bausch. In 2024, their show was named Best Vegan Podcast by Mercy for Animals. In 2024, Alexandra was featured in the Hulu docuseries After Baywatch: A Moment in the Sun, an in-depth look at Baywatch and the actors involved in the show.

In 2025, Paul won the Los Angeles Press Club's National Entertainment & Journalism Award for Celebrity Investigative Reporting. She was nominated for her first person account published in The Ankler titled Stalked: a Baywatch Star's 13 Year Nightmare. The two other finalists were from Rolling Stone and Nightline.

== Personal life ==
Paul and triathlon coach Ian Murray have been together since 1995, and they married in 2000. She became a vegetarian at age fourteen after reading the book Diet for a Small Planet by Frances Moore Lappé, and became a vegan in 2010.

As an athlete, Paul raced the Hawaii Ironman in 1997. She ran the 2000 Boston Marathon. She has also swam the 11 mile Fiji Swim, the 12.5 mile Swim Around Key West and the 2014 Reto Acapulco 14 mile swim, among others.

In 2015, Paul became a certified health coach and had her own wellness coaching business for seven years.

In an article she wrote for The Ankler, she described a 13-year ordeal marked by relentless harassment from an obsessive female fan, which cost her $60,000 in legal fees. The stalker allegedly monitored all of Paul's activities, engaged in dangerous driving by running her off the road, accused her of antisemitism, and falsely claimed her husband was a pedophile. After years of such harassment, the stalker was eventually arrested, deported, returned to the United States, and continued to target Paul and her husband until she died in 2024. Despite numerous legal actions—including restraining orders and federal intervention—the stalker's obsession persisted, greatly affecting Paul's daily life and mental health.

== Activism ==
At the age of 22, Paul co-founded Young Artists United with 21 year old producer and manager Daniel Sladek. YAU was made up of young actors, producers, writers and other Hollywood creatives working together to have a positive effect by speaking in schools, raising money for youth organizations and producing PSAs. It was honored by Mothers Against Drunk Driving (MADD). Paul is also an animal rights, environmental, peace and gay rights activist. She walked 5 1/2 weeks on the Great Peace March for Global Nuclear Disarmament in 1986. Paul has been arrested for civil disobedience over a dozen times at the Nevada Test Site between 1987 and 2000. In 1989, she was arrested for peacefully advocating on behalf of people with HIV. She was arrested twice in 2003 for civil disobedience protesting the Iraq War and spent five days in the Los Angeles Metropolitan Detention Center after refusing to pay the $50 fine. In 2005, she was arrested for protesting the crushing of the EV1, and performed 80–100 hours of community service for electric car organizations. Paul's younger brother, Jonathan, is also an animal rights activist, who served 51 months in prison for his role in the arson of a slaughterhouse.

She has traveled to Nicaragua with Operation USA and to South Africa to register voters. Paul volunteered in Sierra Leone with the non profit Population Media Center. She has spoken to dozens of classrooms about the issue of human overpopulation, including several times at San Diego State University and to graduate students at Scripps Institution of Oceanography. In 2006, Paul donated $250 to the Ned Lamont campaign against Joe Lieberman, because Lieberman supported the war in Iraq.

Paul was an active member for 9 years of the Santa Monica, CA chapter of Food Not Bombs, where she picked up donations, cooked, and served hot vegan meals to the homeless community every Thursday evening. She also registered voters sitting at a card table on LA street corners for 2 hours a week from 1989 to 2010 with The First Vote.

She received the 2014 Vegan of the Year by Last Chance for Animals, and in 2007 received a United Nations Environment Programme honor for her contribution to overpopulation issues.

In 2016, Paul joined Direct Action Everywhere in an open rescue of several pigs from a factory farm. In 2017, she joined a sit-in at an Oakland, California slaughterhouse and was arrested. In 2018, she was arrested for a civil disobedience action at Sunrise Chicken Farm. In 2019, she was arrested for peacefully protesting at Reichardt Duck Farm and spent two days in Sonoma County jail. In September 2020, Paul and 6 other DxE activists were arrested for trying to rescue a pig from a Farmer John slaughterhouse in Vernon, California. In 2023, Alexandra went to court for rescuing a chicken from a Foster Farms slaughterhouse truck. After a 9 day trial, she was acquitted. In March 2026 she was arrested after alleged trespassing with other activists on the Ridglan Farms dog breeding facility in Blue Mounds, Wisconsin. . She spent 2 days in jail. She has been charged with felony burglary, along with 50 other activists. Her first court appearance is October 19, 2026.

In discussing her political activism, Paul said:

I am sure there are some who do not like me for my outspokenness and my views, and I totally respect their right to boycott my projects. I actually respect folks who stand up for their beliefs — even if I disagree with them — more than the folks who do not care, are afraid to 'get involved', or who cannot be bothered. I admire passion and commitment. A woman once told me she could not watch those slaughterhouse videos because she 'loves animals so much' and it would upset her. I would prefer to hang out with a hunter who believes he is doing the right thing, than a wuss like her.

== Filmography ==
=== Films ===
Year	Title	Role	Notes
1983	American Nightmare	Isabelle	Filmed in 1980
1983	Christine	Leigh Cabot	
1984	Just the Way You Are	Bobbie	
1985	American Flyers	Becky	
1986	8 Million Ways to Die	Sunny	
1987	Dragnet	Connie Swail	
1988	After the Rain	Annie May Bonner	
1988	It's Cool to Care	-	Short
1991	Millions	Giulia Ferretti	
1991	In Between	Amy Budd	
1992	Kuffs	The Chief's Wife	
1993	Sunset Grill	Anita	
1994	Nothing to Lose	Natasha	
1994	The Paperboy	Melissa Thorpe	
1995	Baywatch the Movie: Forbidden Paradise	Stephanie Holden	
1995	Cyber Bandits	Rebecca Snow	
1995	Mixed Blessings	Beth	
1996	Spy Hard	Woman In Murphy Bed	Cameo appearance
1996	Spectre	Maura South	
1996	Kid Cop	Sarah Hansen	
1997	Kiss & Tell	Bambi	
1998	12 Bucks	Epiphany Lovejoy	
2000	Revenge	Laura Underwood	
2000	The Brainiacs.com	Kara Banks	
2001	For the Love of May	Emily	Short
2001	Above & Beyond	Jill Amorosa	
2001	10 Attitudes	Leslie	
2001	Facing the Enemy	Olivia McCleary	
2001	Diary of a Sex Addict	Katherine	
2001	Breaking Up Really Sucks	Charlie	Short
2001	Exposure	Jackie Steerman	
2002	Redemption of the Ghost	Audrey Powell	
2003	A Woman Hunted	Lainie Wheeler	
2006	Who Killed the Electric Car?	Herself	
2006	Borat	Herself	Deleted scene
2008	Tru Loved	Leslie	
2008	Murder Dot Com	Stacy	
2009	Benny Bliss and the Disciples of Greatness	Mall Gal	
2009	Christmas Crash	Christine Johnson	
2009	He's Such a Girl	Linda	
2009	Family of Four	Janice Baker	
2010	In My Sleep	Roxana	
2010	The Boy She Met Online	Tori Winters	
2011	Javelina	Lora	
2012	16-Love	Margo Mash	
2012	The Frankenstein Brothers	Laurie Martinson	
2014	Dinner at Le Cruel	Wife	Short
2014	Mentor	Alexandra	Short
2015	Flirting with Madness	Detective Kathy Schumaker	
2016	Dirty	Assistant D.A Sara Dunlap	
2018	Say Yes	Mrs. Muñoz	
2020	Finding Sara	Aunt Carrie	
2020	The Estate	Bethenny	
2020	Pink Skies Ahead	Mercedes	
2022	Tethered	Nidia	
2022	Another Coffee House Chronicles Movie	Amy	
2023	Baby Steps	Abigail Munoz	
2025	Redlining	Gloria	

=== Television series ===
Year	Title	Role	Notes
1982	Paper Dolls	Laurie Caswell	
1987	The Hitchhiker	Julie	Episode: "Minuteman"
1992–97	Baywatch	Stephanie Holden	Main Cast: Season 3–6, Recurring Cast: Season 7
1993	What's Up Doc?	Herself	Recurring Guest
1993	Johnny Bago	Erica	Episode: "Spotting Elvis"
1994	This Is Your Life	Herself	Episode: "David Hasselhoff"
1995	Wheel of Fortune	Herself/Celebrity Contestant	Episode: "Celebrity Week 4"
1996	L.A. Firefighters	Firefighter T.K. Martin	Main Cast
1997	Brass Eye	Herself (voice)	Episode: "Animals"
1997	Baywatch Nights	Lieutenant Stephanie Holden	Episode: "The Eighth Seal"
1998	Love Boat: The Next Wave	Gillian Stanfield	Episode: "All That Glitters"
1999	Melrose Place	Terry O'Brien	Recurring Cast: Season 7
2000	Chicken Soup for the Soul	Leann Richards	Episode: "Destiny in a Bottle"
2001	The Test	Herself/Panelist	Episode: "The Slut Test"
2001–04	E! True Hollywood Story	Herself	Recurring Guest
2003	She Spies	Christine Black	Episode: "Date to Mate"
2004	Getaway	Herself	Episode: "Getaway Goes to Hollywood"
2005	Biography	Herself	Episode: "David Hasselhoff: Driven"
2005	Class of...	Herself	Episode: "1989: Life After Baywatch"
2007	Whatever Happened To?	Herself	Episode: "Beach Babes"
2008	Mad Men	Pauline Phillips	Episode: "Maidenform"
2011	The Traveler's Guide to Life	Herself	Episode: "Family" & "Winning"
2014	Alive & Well with Michelle Harris	Herself	Episode: "Look Better, Feel Better"
2020	Coffee House Chronicles	Amy	Episode: "Good Grief" & "Bad Math"
2021	TV Therapy	Stephanie	Episode: "Stephanie"

=== TV films, limited series, and specials ===
Year	Title	Role	Notes
1984	Getting Physical	Kendall Gibley	
1988	Out of the Shadows	Jan Lindsey	
1989	Perry Mason: The Case of the Lethal Lesson	Amy Hastings	
1989	Perry Mason: The Case of the Musical Murder	Amy Hastings	
1989	Perry Mason: The Case of the All-Star Assassin	Amy Hastings	
1990	Laker Girls	Heidi/Jenny	
1992	Prey of the Chameleon	Carrie	
1993	Death Train	Sabrina Carver	
1995	Piranha	Maggie McNamara	
1995	Night Watch	Sabrina Carver	
1995	Mixed Blessings	Beth	
1996	Daytona Beach	Annie Gibson	
1997	Echo	Olivia Jordan	
1999	Arthur's Quest	Caitlin Regal	
2000	Green Sails	Laura Taylor	
2001	Rough Air: Danger on Flight 534	Flight Attendant Katy Phillips	
2003	Baywatch: Hawaiian Wedding	Allison Ford	
2004	Saving Emily	Cheryl	
2005	Landslide	Emma Decker	
2005	The Phone Ranger	Short	
2005	A Lover's Revenge	Liz Manners	
2006	Disaster Zone: Volcano in New York	Dr. Susan Foxley	
2006	Love Thy Neighbor	Laura Benson	
2006	Gospel of Deceit	Emily	
2006	A.I. Assault	Marlon Adams	
2006	Trapped!	Samantha Reed	
2007	Demons from Her Past	Allison Buchanan	
2009	A Sister's Secret	Katherine	
2011	Betrayed at 17	Michelle Ross	
2011	Christmas Spirit	Winnie	
2012	Love at the Christmas Table	Eve Reed	
2013	Stars in Danger: The High Dive	Herself	
2014	Firequake	Dr. Eve Carter	
2016	Sharknado: The 4th Awakens	Stephanie Holden	
2017	Born and Missing	Detective Breuer	
2020	Escaping My Stalker	Sandy	

== Bibliography ==
- Lechaux, Bleuwenn & Violane Roussel (2010). Voicing Dissent: American Artists and the War on Iraq. Routledge. ISBN 978-0-415-80058-7.
