= Death Train =

- Movie cover
- Also known as: Detonator
- Genre: Action; Thriller
- Based on: Death Train by Alistair MacNeill
- Written by: David Jackson
- Screenplay by: Alistair MacLean
- Directed by: David Jackson
- Starring: Pierce Brosnan; Patrick Stewart; Christopher Lee; Ted Levine; Alexandra Paul
- Theme music composer: Trevor Jones
- Country of origin: United States
- Original language: English

Production
- Producer: Peter Snell
- Production locations: Zagreb, Croatia; Ribnica, Slovenia
- Cinematography: Timothy Eaton
- Editors: Eric Boyd-Perkins; Peter Musgrave
- Running time: 100 minutes
- Production company: USA Pictures
- Budget: £2.3 million

Original release
- Network: USA Network
- Release: April 14, 1993

Death Train (also known as Detonator) is a 1993 American made-for-television action-thriller disaster film featuring Pierce Brosnan, Patrick Stewart, Christopher Lee, Ted Levine, and Alexandra Paul. The script was based on an Alastair MacNeill novel of the same name, which in turn was based on an Alistair MacLean screenplay.

== Plot ==
With the aid of a German nuclear physicist, dissident Russian General Konstantin Benin (Christopher Lee), a military casualty of the Soviet collapse, is conspiring to restore the Soviet Union to superpower status. His plan is to place a nuclear bomb on a train controlled by mercenaries, led by Alex Tierney (Ted Levine), bound for Iraq, forcing the Russian army to invade Iraq to recover it and once again mobilize its might - creating a new military union in the process. Malcolm Philpott (Patrick Stewart), the head of the United Nations Anti-Crime Organisation (UNACO), entrusts the mission of stopping the train and its deadly cargo to a multinational team led by field operative Mike Graham (Pierce Brosnan) and information analyst Sabrina Carver (Alexandra Paul) who are forced to form a reluctant partnership as the international balance of power hits crisis point.

== Cast ==
- Pierce Brosnan as Mike Graham
- Patrick Stewart as Malcolm Philpott
- Alexandra Paul as Sabrina Carver
- Ted Levine as Alex Tierney
- Christopher Lee as General Konstantin Benin
- John Abineri as Dr. Karl Leitzig
- Clarke Peters as C.W. Whitlock
- Nick D'Avirro as Major Gennadi Rodenko
- Andreas Jung as Lt. Sergei Kolchinsky
- Ron Berglas as Roger Flint
- Terrence Hardiman as Captain Wolf
- Jay Benedict as Halloran
- Daniel Stewart as Corporal Tretyak
- Darko Milas as Corporal Kuznetsov
- Vili Matula as Sigi

== Novel ==
MacLean had written a number of unfinished storylines before he died in 1987. These were fleshed out in novel form by Alistair MacNeill: Death Train and Night Watch. One review of Death Train said "MacLean fans have to wonder just how much of the detail is indeed his. For example, MacLean's heroes are traditionally thrown on their own wits to survive in sticky situations. Death Train’s three agents are rarely tested this way, and yell for help when the going gets tough. Having Big Brother step in on cue with its muscle is no substitute for imaginative heroics".

In 1991 a Warwickshire Council trading standards department sued the publisher of the novels claiming misleading advertising, in part because MacLean's name featured in bigger type on the book cover than MacNeill's. In September the publishers were fined £6,250 for misleading advertising. By that stage they had sold 355,000 copies of MacNeill's first two novels.

When a third MacNeill novel, Time of the Assassins, came out in late 1991 the cover art was amended so MacNeill's name was as large as MacLean's.

== Locations ==
Film rights were bought by USA Pictures, an offshoot of the USA Network. They would make films for screening on the USA Network in the US but which could be shown theatrically in other territories. Death Train was the first in a slate of four pictures.

It was the first project Brosnan made following the death of his wife. In Brosnan's words: "It's boy's own adventure. It's everything I've wanted to do - run along the top of trains, shoot guns and climb in and out of helicopters".

The film was shot entirely on location in Slovenia and at Jadran Film Studios, Zagreb, Croatia as a co-production between Yorkshire International Films Ltd., and Jadran Film. Filming finished by June 1992. The country was in turmoil at the time due to the Yugoslav Wars. Brosnan said it was "a heightened exhilaration in a lot of ways because the hotel we were staying in was overrun by soldiers. The combat outfits that we wore were just like the Croatian Army, which seems to be a hodgepodge of uniforms. At times, going to work was like going to the front because it was very tough (to shoot)".

== Reception ==
The film was popular at the box office in the United Kingdom, but debuted in the United States on the USA Network.

== Home media ==
The film was released on by New Line Home Video on VHS tape in the US as "Detonator" in 1993.

The Region 2 UK DVD release (by Prism Leisure) of Death Train lacks English subtitles for the Russian dialogue. The scenes with Russian dialogue are meant to be hard-subbed, as was the case with TV broadcast, VHS, and the Region 1 American DVD versions.

== Sequel ==
Pierce Brosnan and Alexandra Paul returned for the sequel Detonator II: Night Watch. Night Watch is available on Region 1 DVD both individually and bundled as a double pack with Death Train.
