= Night Watch (1995 film) =

1995 American television spy film

- DVD cover
- Also known as: Detonator II: Night Watch
- Genre: Action; Thriller
- Based on: Night Watch by Alistair MacNeill
- Written by: Alistair MacLean
- Screenplay by: David Jackson
- Directed by: David Jackson
- Starring: Pierce Brosnan; Alexandra Paul
- Theme music composer: John Scott
- Country of origin: United States
- Original language: English

Production
- Producer: Peter Snell
- Cinematography: Michael Negrin
- Editor: Eric Boyd-Perkins
- Running time: 101 minutes
- Production companies: J&M Entertainment
- Budget: $6 million

Original release
- Network: USA Network
- Release: October 13, 1995

Night Watch (also known as Detonator II: Night Watch) is a 1995 American television spy film directed by David Jackson starring Pierce Brosnan and Alexandra Paul. The film, also known as Alistair MacLean's Nightwatch, was shot in Hong Kong. The film premiered on USA Network on October 13, 1995. It is a sequel to Death Train.

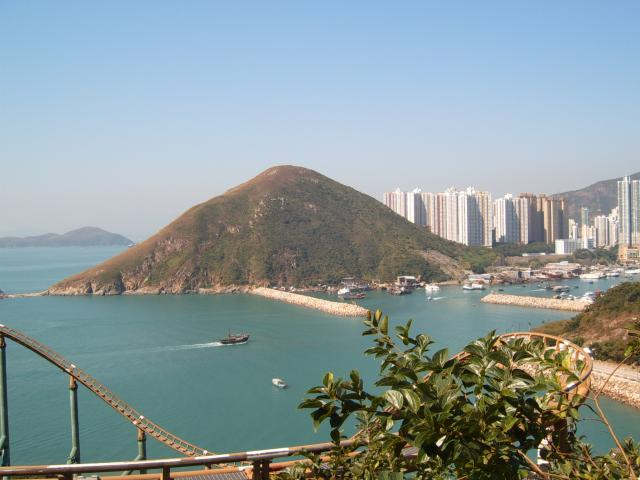
Hong Kong location

== Cast ==
- Pierce Brosnan as Mike Graham
- Alexandra Paul as Sabrina Carver
- William Devane as Nick Caldwell
- Michael J. Shannon as Martin Schraeder
- Lim Kay Siu as Mao Yixin (as Lim Kay Siu)
- Irene Ng as Myra Tang
- Hidde Maas as Miles Van Dehn
- Tom Jansen as Insp. De Jongh
- Tomislav Ralis as Louis Armand
- Harold Bone as Lemmer
- Rolf Saxon as Fisk
- Natalie Roles as Jennifer
- Kate Harper as Psychologist
- Mark King as Luke Sheehan
- Terry Diab as U.N.A.C.O. Voice (voice)
- Ron Berglas as Roger Flint
- Suncana Zelenika as Stephanie
- Ron Li-Paz as New York Broker
- Jasna Bilušić as Amsterdam G.N.N. Reporter
- Neo Swee Lin as Croupier (as Swee-Lin)
- Goran Višnjić as UN security officer
- Rex Wei as Korean Ship Captain
- Adrian Pang as Korean Technician
- Ed Miller as Hong Kong C.I.A. Technician

== Novel ==
Like Death Train, the film was based on a novel by Alistair MacNeill which in turn was based on a story by Alistair MacLean.

MacLean had written a number of unfinished storylines before he died in 1987. These were fleshed out in novel form by Alistair MacNeill. Night Watch came out in 1990. A review of the novel said: "The book doesn't have MacLean's touch, but MacNeill has managed to capture some of the verve and daring spirit of the original. Like other recent remakes - including Ian Fleming and Rex Stout - this version of Alistair MacLean will probably fan the fires of loyalty among his fans". In 1991 a Warwickshire Council trading standards department sued the publisher of the novel claiming misleading advertising. In September the publishers were fined £6,250 for misleading advertising. By that stage they had sold 355,000 copies of MacNeill's novels.

When a third MacNeill novel, Time of the Assassins, came out in late 1991 the cover art was amended so MacNeill's name was as large as MacLean's.

== Production ==
The film was shot in Zagreb, with some second unit filming involving Brosnan in Hong Kong. It was the last film Brosnan made before he played James Bond in Goldeneye.

Producer Neil MacDonald said the budget "will cost less to make altogether than Pierce's fee for appearing as James Bond in his next film".

== Release ==
Night Watch aired on the USA Network on October 13, 1995. In the Philippines, the film was theatrically released by Globe Vision as The Destroyer in mid-1997.

== DVD release ==
Detonator II: Night Watch is available on Region 1 DVD both individually and bundled as a double pack with Detonator (a.k.a. Death Train).
