= List of Baywatch episodes =

Below is a list of all the episodes from Baywatch (1989–2001). Will Rogers State Beach served as the predominant beach location for Baywatch, although some scenes were filmed at Long Beach, California, and in Malibu, California.

== Series overview ==
Season	Episodes	Originally released		
Season	Episodes	First released	Last released	Network
Pilot		April 23, 1989		NBC
1	21	September 22, 1989	April 6, 1990	NBC
2	22	September 23, 1991	May 18, 1992	Syndication
3	22	September 14, 1992	May 10, 1993	Syndication
4	22	September 20, 1993	May 16, 1994	Syndication
5	22	September 26, 1994	May 22, 1995	Syndication
6	22	September 25, 1995	May 13, 1996	Syndication
7	22	September 23, 1996	May 12, 1997	Syndication
8	22	September 22, 1997	May 18, 1998	Syndication
9	22	September 21, 1998	May 17, 1999	Syndication
10	22	September 20, 1999	May 15, 2000	Syndication
11	22	October 2, 2000	May 14, 2001	Syndication
Reunion		February 28, 2003		Fox

== Episodes ==
=== Pilot TV movie (1989) ===
Title	Directed by	Written by	Original release date	Viewers (millions)
Panic at Malibu Pier	Richard Compton	Story by : Michael Berk & Douglas Schwartz and Gregory J. Bonann; Teleplay by : Michael Berk & Douglas Schwartz	April 23, 1989	25.9
Mitch Buchannon (David Hasselhoff), just promoted to lieutenant, is having regrets about what he is giving up. He has an argument with his former wife Gayle (Wendie Malick), who has filed suit to have full custody of their son Hobie (Brandon Call). Eddie Kramer (Billy Warlock) and Shauni McClain (Erika Eleniak) are two of the rookie class of '89 to qualify. An Australian immigrant, Trevor Cole (Peter Phelps), is a lifeguard at a beach club which uses part of the beach overseen by Baywatch but he alienates Mitch with his arrogant, competitive attitude, which extends to putting lives at risk during a rescue. Shauni resents being assigned to a lifeguard boat, but when ordered to perform CPR on Cindy (Danielle Delaunay), a young girl who has been rescued, she freezes and lifeguard Jill Riley (Shawn Weatherly) tries to console her. A young woman, Laurie Harris (Mädchen Amick), attempts suicide by jumping off a pier and is rescued by Craig Pomeroy (Parker Stevenson) who takes her back to his tower to keep an eye on her. She develops an extreme infatuation with him and when Craig is about to close his tower, Laurie disrobes and tries to seduce him. Craig rebuffs her but they are seen by fellow lifeguard Owen (John Sherrod) arriving to give Craig a lift. Later at Mitch's party, Laurie manages to convince Craig's wife Gina (Gina Hecht) that she and Craig had sex together. Next day, Craig and Gina find a distraught Laurie with bruises on her neck which she says were inflicted by her father, so they let her spend the night in their house. Next morning, Craig visits Laurie's mother (Veronica Cartwright) who tells him that Laurie's father has been dead for ten years and Laurie was recently released from a mental hospital because she was harming herself. Fearing that Gina might be in danger from Laurie, Craig finds them under the pier with Laurie attacking Gina with a knife. Craig wrestles the knife away from her and subdues her. Mitch is ordered to tell his long-time lifeguard friend Al Gibson (Richard Jaeckel) that he is being taken off the beach because he is past his prime. Later, Al takes Hobie on a fishing trip and an accidental propane explosion in the ship's kitchen destroys the boat. Al tries to calm the other survivors as they cling to debris in the water. Among the rescuers is Shauni, who must overcome her fears, and Mitch who, along with Al, try to rescue three people including Hobie trapped underneath the capsized boat on the ocean floor. After Mitch dives to the boat to investigate, he returns to a rescue boat for scuba gear, while Al free-dives and reaches those trapped. Mitch and Al rescue the survivors, but, in the process, Al's legs become tangled in a fishing net, preventing him from surfacing. Mitch dives and releases him, but, despite Mitch performing CPR on him, Al dies. Baywatch arranges a funeral at sea for Al, at which Mitch eulogizes his fallen friend. Notes: Richard Jaeckel who plays Al Gibson in this episode, also played Lieutenant, later Captain, Ben Edwards from 1991 to 1994. Gina Hecht]plays Gina Pomeroy in the pilot but Holly Gagnier takes over the role in subsequent episodes. Nancy Valen who plays Hallie in the pilot, later became a regular cast member in 1996 as Captain Samantha Thomas. Brian Austin Green, who would later go on to star on Beverly Hills, 90210 has a small role as Brian, a boy on the beach in this episode. John Sherrod has a small role as life guard Owen in this episode. Kellie Martin plays Chelsea Carroll, a girl in whom Hobie is interested. Montage Music: "Look Out Any Window" and "The Show Goes On" performed by Bruce Hornsby & The Range, "Slave to Love" performed by Bryan Ferry, "Dirty Dancing" performed by Diana DeWitt.

=== Season 1 (1989–1990) ===
No. overall	No. in season	Title	Directed by	Written by	Original release date	Prod. code	Viewers (millions)
1	1	"In Deep"	Peter H. Hunt	Michael Berk & Douglas Schwartz	September 22, 1989	1003	18.4
Instead of attending summer school, Hobie decides to go power skiing with his friends Scott (Christopher Murphy) and Ron (Lance Gilbert), whose recklessness leads to a tragic accident. Eddie's lack of financial resources is revealed when Craig finds him sleeping in one of the lifeguard towers. Notes: First appearance of Garner Ellerbee (Gregory Alan Williams). Montage music: "Life is a Carnival" - The Band
2	2	"Heat Wave"	Gus Trikonis	Ernie Wallengren	September 29, 1989	1004	15.7
On the run from Patrick Murphy (Bart Braverman), a mysterious man with a gun, Steve Humboldt (Jeffrey Byron), an old friend of Mitch and Craig, shows up with his son Mike (Matt Feemster) and asks to stay with Mitch. Mike and another boy, Ricky Blount (Thomas Ian Nicholas), become stuck in a large drain that is rapidly filling with the incoming tide and Mitch leads a group to rescue them before it's too late. Meanwhile, Craig is given an ultimatum by his law firm boss Marty Dreyfuss (William Joyce) and must make a decision whether to be a lawyer or lifeguard. Montage music: "Room to Move" – Animotion, “Working on It” – Chris Rea
3	3	"Second Wave"	Scott Brazil	Jill Donner	October 13, 1989	1005	14.7
An old acquaintance from Eddie's hometown, Jimmy Roché (Daniel Quinn), comes to Los Angeles and begins to make life difficult for Eddie. Trevor dates Lisa Peters (Mariska Hargitay), the daughter of a rich man at the country club (Gerald Gordon) who proves to be a handful. Mitch is stressed about upcoming lieutenant evaluation tests. Notes: This is the first appearance in the series for Daniel Quinn, who returned in later episodes portraying a total of three different characters, as well as directing an episode. David Spade features in a small role as B.J., one of Jimmy's lackeys. Montage music: “Don’t Look Back” - Charlie Sexton
4	4	"Message in a Bottle"	Kim Manners	Terry Erwin	October 20, 1989	1006	16.5
Gayle is planning to move to Ohio and wants to take Hobie with her. Upset over the squabbling that ensues, Hobie takes off with friends Clark (Marc Dakota Robinson) and Jenny Drake (Jandi Swanson) and the kids become the targets of pirates on a nearby island. Eddie and Shauni squabble after Shauni accidentally hurts Eddie. Montage music: “Something So Strong” – Jim Capaldi, “Touch” – Noiseworks, “Roam” – The B-52s
5	5	"The Sky Is Falling"	Kim Manners	William Rabkin & Lee Goldberg	October 27, 1989	1007	17.1
Gayle and Mitch continue to fight over Gayle's plan to take custody of Hobie in Ohio. She ultimately changes her mind after Hobie risks his life to save a drowning young girl (Ginny Wohland). A plane crashes into the water near the beach with the occupants Harv (James Sloyan) and Sylvia (Carol Siskind), after they are rescued, looking to recover a suitcase of stolen money that they had with them. Captain Don Thorpe (Monte Markham) decides to join Eddie and Shauni on their tower in order to teach them. Thorpe later detains Harv and Sylvia in a way that impresses Eddie. Montage music: “As the Days Go By” – Daryl Braithwaite, “Money (That's What I Want)” – Barrett Strong
6	6	"The Drowning Pool"	Mario DiLeo	William A. Schwartz	November 3, 1989	1008	16.7
Jill pulls Alex Benton (Richard Roat), a drowning man, from the ocean but the lifeguards are unable to revive him. She suspects foul play and while investigating further, she begins seeing Derrick (Christopher Rich), Alex's son. Meanwhile, Fred Rachins (Jeff Altman), the man who initially spotted Alex, becomes obsessed with becoming a lifeguard himself. Note: Jeff Altman makes his first appearance in the series as Fred Rachins, a serial imposter. He would go on to feature in future episodes portraying a total of five different characters. Montage music: Original music by Cory/John
7	7	"Rookie School"	Bruce Seth Green	Lee Goldberg & William Rabkin	November 10, 1989	1009	16.6
Amy Laederach (Christine Elise) steals a book from powerful man Howard Ganza (William Fichtner) and hides out from him with the help of Eddie. Craig and Gina contemplate having children when they are married but have second thoughts after meeting couple Lou (Ken Thorley) and Phyllis (Judy Nazemetz) while on a romantic weekend. Trevor discovers that Jeff Dalender (Todd Bryant), his toughest competitor among the rookies, is using PEDs. Note: Earl Boen features as the annoying clerk in the bed and breakfast where Craig and Gina stay. Montage music: “Stop the World” – Big Big Sun
8	8	"Cruise Ship"	Tommy Lee Wallace	Jill Donner & William A. Schwartz	November 24, 1989	1011	17.3
Eddie does not like Shauni's new boyfriend Andrew Garrison (Steven Eckholdt) or the way he treats her when things do not go the way he wants. Hobie gets in trouble with Jenny, who has a crush on him. Meanwhile, party boat operator Tom Logan (Bryan Cranston) becomes a problem for the lifeguards at Baywatch.
9	9	"The Cretin of the Shallows"	Vern Gillum	William A. Schwartz & Ernie Wallengren	December 1, 1989	1010	14.9
Craig becomes suspicious when a string of murders seem to be connected with the construction of a new hotel which has ties to popular senator Thomas Hastings (Wayne Tippit). Meanwhile, under the influence of anesthesia, Eddie hallucinates a romantic encounter with Gina, causing him to be nervous around Craig. On the beach Shauni finds herself strongly adored. Note: Betsy Randle, Robert Trebor and Janice Lynde all feature in brief roles. Montage music: “Power of Suggestion” – Steve Stevens, “The Look” – Roxette
10	10	"Shelter Me"	Scott Brazil	Terry Erwin	December 8, 1989	1012	14.7
An approaching tropical storm has the Baywatch lifeguards preparing for its effects but the presence of two wanted criminals, Frank (Neil Giuntoli and Dick (Sherman Howard), cause unforeseen events. Eddie and Shauni begin to spark a romance. Hobie and his friend Alex (Jenny Lewis) wait out the storm at the Buchannon house. Montage music: “True Love” – Glenn Frey
11	11	"The Reunion"	Rob Bowman	W. Reed Moran	December 15, 1989	1013	14.6
Mitch attends his high school reunion and reunites with classmate Allison Gibson (Dana Sparks), which stirs up old feelings. Eddie, frustrated at having no car, buys one at an extremely low price from his buddy Corey Darrow (Tony Higgins) but quickly discovers the reason why the cost was so low. Montage music: “Showdown at Big Sky” – Robbie Robertson, “Healing Waters” – Starship, “I Get Up” – Julian Lennon
12	12	"Armored Car"	Michael Ray Rhodes	Story by : Michael Berk and Douglas Schwartz; Teleplay by : Lee Goldberg & William Rabkin	January 5, 1990	1014	16.3
A pro-am beach volleyball tournament is being held and Trevor tries to convince Jill to be his partner for the competition. Their main rival in the competition is Jill's previous volleyball partner and ex-boyfriend Chris Barron (Jon Lindstrom), which cements Jill's resolve to compete. Meanwhile, an exhibition geared to drum up interest in saving a local pier leads to Shauni and Eddie becoming trapped underwater in a locked armored truck after part of the pier collapses. Montage music: “Lay Your Hands on Me” – Bon Jovi
13	13	"Home Cort"	Paul Schneider	Terry Erwin & William A. Schwartz	January 12, 1990	1015	15.0
Former lifeguard John D. Cort (John Allen Nelson) returns to Baywatch and stirs up different emotions for the current staff. Jill and Shauni go into business selling sandwiches but find competition to be stiffer than expected. Montage music: “No One Else” – East of Eden
14	14	"We Need a Vacation"	Gus Trikonis	Lee Goldberg & William Rabkin	January 26, 1990	1016	15.8
Craig joins Cort and Eddie on a trip to Mexico for a long overdue vacation but find themselves defending a small town from a troublesome gang with the help of local bar owner Ines (Roxann Biggs). Meanwhile, Mitch has an unexpected house guest after Captain Thorpe considers divorcing his wife Doris, and Hobie falls in love with Shauni. Note: John Quade, Aaron Lohr and Tony Genaro all feature in minor roles. Montage music: “Vacation (In My Mind)” – Tom Cochrane
15	15	"Muddy Waters"	Paul Schneider	William A. Schwartz & Terry Erwin	February 2, 1990	1017	17.8
Cort and Eddie are assigned to a local water park to teach teenagers about lifeguard duties but one of them, Tad (Ricky Paull Goldin) quickly resents Eddie's presence. Hobie's teacher Amanda Keller (Sherilyn Wolter) reveals to Mitch that the parents of other students at school have a dim view of the occupation of lifeguarding. Craig assists Shauni when she gets into trouble after pictures of her are published in a swimsuit calendar. Montage music: “Whole Lotta Shakin'” – The Georgia Satellites
16	16	"Snake Eyes"	Gus Trikonis	Kate Boutilier	February 9, 1990	1018	13.9
An illegal offshore casino causes problems for Cort and some of his fellow lifeguards. Hobie thinks his English class is going to be a breeze when Mitch starts dating Amanda but soon learns otherwise. Montage music: “One Good Woman” – Peter Cetera
17	17	"Eclipse"	Paul Schneider	Claire Whitaker	February 23, 1990	1019	16.5
Eddie believes he sees a ghost by the water and the others believe that he is losing his mind. Hobie learns that his friend Katie (Hayley Corr)'s dog Rocky is going to be euthanized for an alleged attack and resolves to help both of them. Montage music: “Breaking Point” – The Moody Blues
18	18	"Shark Derby"	Gregory J. Bonann	Kate Boutilier & Terry Erwin	March 2, 1990	1020	19.4
Local business owner Bucky Allen (Peter Brown) organizes a shark derby and Mitch's fears are realized when a shark attack turns deadly. Notes: Michael Stoyanov features as Roy, one of Bucky's lackeys. Montage music: “Goodbye My Friend” – Linda Ronstadt
19	19	"The Big Race"	Kevin Inch	Rolf Wallengren	March 16, 1990	1021	15.4
Cort enters a race for prize money to save a charitable organization he supports. Meanwhile, Shauni anguishes over the events of the past few weeks and deliberates her future. Montage music: “When the Going Gets Tough, the Tough Get Going” – Billy Ocean
20	20	"Old Friends"	Douglas Schwartz	William A. Schwartz	March 30, 1990	1022	14.1
Mitch, Craig and Garner go on a hang gliding trip that results in a series of accidents for all three. Meanwhile, Cort thinks he sees his old friend Lance Jarvis (Jeff Lester) that he thought had died a year ago. Note: Jeff Lester would later guest star in the season 2 finale episode "Summer of '85" as environmentalist Lane Brody. Montage music: “Miss You Now” – Trevor Rabin
21	21	"The End?"	Reza Badiyi	Lee Goldberg & William Rabkin	April 6, 1990	1023	15.3
An earthquake shakes Baywatch headquarters and causes many problems for the lifeguards, and for one, a life altering decision is made.

=== Season 2 (1991–1992) ===
No. overall	No. in season	Title	Directed by	Written by	Original release date	Prod. code
22	1	"Nightmare Bay: Parts 1 & 2"	Gregory J. Bonann	Michael Berk & Douglas Schwartz	September 23, 1991	2001
23	2	"Nightmare Bay: Parts 1 & 2"	Gregory J. Bonann	Michael Berk & Douglas Schwartz	September 23, 1991	2002
Underwater photographer Linda Harrelson (Kelly Garrison) is attacked and more than a few people believe a sea monster is responsible. While a nosy reporter Kaye Morgan (Pamela Bach) furthers the hysteria over a potential "toxic mutant jellyfish", Mitch and his fellow lifeguards are determined to get to the bottom of the mystery. Shauni's work as a lifeguard leads to conflict with a bunch of locals, as well as her own father Robert (Albert Stratton). Note: Pamela Bach makes her first appearance as Kaye Morgan, a news reporter (later surf restaurant owner) in this two-part episode. Bach was the then-wife of David Hasselhoff. Montage music: Original music by Cory/John, “Get Up” – Mike and the Mechanics, “Rock Hard” – Jimmy Jamison, “Keep Me Running” – Noiseworks, “Current of Love” – David Hasselhoff
24	3	"The One That Got Away"	Gus Trikonis	Ronni Kern	September 30, 1991	2008
A fisherman (Rick Dean) tricks new lifeguard Megan (Vanessa Angel) into rescuing him in order to sexually assault her. When he continues to stalk her, Mitch has to find a way to stop him. Meanwhile, when Shauni suffers from lifeguard burnout, Eddie takes her on a romantic weekend getaway, which quickly turns passionate. Montage music: ”Don’t Do That” – Marshall Crenshaw, “When Love Comes Down” – Jimmy Jamison
25	4	"Money, Honey"	Monte Markham	Alan Swyer	October 7, 1991	2004
Mitch is offered the lead role in an action movie when the star Larry Brooks (Mark Hutch Eliot) is injured but risks losing his role when he rejects the amorous advances of the film's producer Dita (Leslie Easterbrook). Meanwhile, Shauni tries to raise money to keep an animal rescue organization from shutting down. Montage music: “Boom Band Boom” – Steve Schiff, “Summertime Girls” – Y&T
26	5	"Fabulous Buchannon Boys"	Gus Trikonis	W. Reed Moran	October 14, 1991	2006
Mitch's brother Buzz (Tim Thomerson) comes to visit with his estranged son Kyle (Chance Michael Corbitt), who proves to be a bad influence on Hobie (Jeremy Jackson). When Kyle illegally surfs near the condemned San Dimas Pier, he collides with a submerged piling and is sent underwater, unconscious. Montage music: “All the Best Things” – The Fixx, “Cloud 8” – Frazier Chorus
27	6	"Point of Attack"	Alan Myerson	Alan Swyer	October 21, 1991	2010
Cort returns to Baywatch, helping Eddie in an aquatics program designed for inner-city youths. When Eddie takes gang leader Memo Urueta (Richard Coca) under his wing, he finds himself in conflict with Memo's father Carlos (Danny Trejo), who has encouraged Memo's gang activity. Montage music: “Crazy” – Seal, “All Love” – Ziggy Marley
28	7	"Sandcastles"	Monte Markham	Garner Simmons	October 28, 1991	2012
Hobie becomes enamored with homeless girl Charlene "Charlie" Reed (Nikki Cox) whose mother June (Wendy Robie) has disappeared. Montage music: “Future Love Paradise” – Seal, “(I Just Wanna) B with U” – Transvision Vamp
29	8	"Thin or Die"	Douglas Schwartz	Deborah Schwartz & Douglas Schwartz	November 4, 1991	2009
Eddie teaches the importance of self-esteem to Nicole (Melinda Riemer), an overweight girl who has loved him from afar, while Mitch and Hobie adopt Sandy, a dog that is the only witness to its owner Tillie McCabe (Fran Ryan)'s kidnapping. Montage music: “So Quiet and So Still” – Natalie Archangel
30	9	"The Trophy: Part 1"	Douglas Schwartz	David Braff	November 11, 1991	2003
Lonely teenager Caroline Larkin (A. J. Langer) lies to impress her peers by claiming she and Eddie spent the night together in his lifeguard tower. When her father Frank (David Groh) hears the story, Eddie's life is thrown into shambles. Meanwhile, Eric Turner (Daniel Quinn), a paraplegic former lifeguard returns to Baywatch, attempting to face his past and former girlfriend Megan. Notes: A. J. Langer would later return to the series in season 4 episode "Guys & Dolls" as grifter Rachel Henderson/Nancy Krebs/Linda. Kelly Packard appears in this two-part episode as Joanie. She would continue to appear in guest roles on subsequent seasons before becoming a regular cast member in season 8 as lifeguard April Giminski. Montage music: Original Music by Cory/John, “Fascination” – West End Girls, “Dream in Color” – Starship, “Angry Young Man” – Jimmy Jamison
31	10	"The Trophy: Part 2"	Douglas Schwartz	David Braff	November 18, 1991	2020
Facing statutory rape charges, Eddie is suspended from Baywatch but when Shauni confronts Caroline to ask her to tell the truth and exonerate Eddie, Caroline, tired of feeling like an outcast, attempts to kill herself. Mitch saves Eric's life in a daring glider rescue.
32	11	"If Looks Could Kill"	Douglas Schwartz	Teleplay by : I.C. Rapoport & Michael Berk; Story by : I.C. Rapoport	November 30, 1991	2011
Mitch falls for Allison Fowles (Shannon Tweed), a beautiful woman he has rescued, never dreaming she is actually a murderess. Montage music: “Lily Was Here” – Candy Dulfer featuring David A. Stewart, “To Have and To Hold” – David Hallyday
33	12	"Reunion"	Gus Trikonis	Teleplay by : Michael Berk; Story by : Jill Sherman Donner & Michael Berk	January 27, 1992	2007
Mitch attends his high school reunion, rekindling an old flame with Gayle, while Eddie plays father for the day when baby Elizabeth Gerson is mysteriously left under his lifeguard tower with a note. Montage music: Original music by Cory/John
34	13	"War of Nerves"	Douglas Schwartz	Deborah Schwartz & Douglas Schwartz	February 3, 1992	2017
Ex-con and martial arts master Mason Sato (Cary-Hiroyuki Tagawa), terrorizes Mitch, Kaye and Hobie. Montage music: “Real Thing” – Brent Bougois, “Saltwater” – Julian Lennon
35	14	"Big Monday"	Gregory J. Bonann	Gary Capo & Julian Whatley & Michael Berk	February 10, 1992	2016
Kaye introduces deaf girl Lili Seger to sign language, while Mitch confronts a terrifying childhood memory and a fear of waves. Montage music: “Life Hold On” – Beth Nielsen Chapman, “Heat of the Jungle” – Chris Isaak
36	15	"Sea of Flames"	Gregory J. Bonann	Michael Berk & Douglas Schwartz	February 17, 1992	2014
The Baywatch crew crack a seaborne drug ring and Ben finds love with aging movie star Maggie James (Constance Towers). Montage music: “Tear It Up” – 38 Special, “Can’t Slow Down” – Joe Satriani
37	16	"Now Sit Right Back and You'll Hear a Tale"	Douglas Schwartz	Lloyd J. Schwartz	February 24, 1992	2019
A routine rescue sends Eddie on a madcap adventure to "Gilligan's Island". Notes: In a special guest appearance, Bob Denver and Dawn Wells reprise their roles as Gilligan and Mary Ann Summers. This episode served as an homage to the classic sitcom created by Sherwood Schwartz, the uncle of Baywatch creator Douglas Schwartz. Music: Gilligan’s Island theme
38	17	"The Chamber"	Gregory J. Bonann	Alan Swyer & Gregg Segal	March 2, 1992	2013
Mitch rescues Hal (Kevin Page), a diver trapped 90 feet below the ocean surface, but almost dies while experiencing the effects of decompression sickness. Montage music: “Point of Origin” – Yanni, “After the Sunrise” – Yanni
39	18	"Shark's Cove"	Monte Markham	Deborah Schwartz & Douglas Schwartz	April 20, 1992	2021
Shauni's friend, beautiful Olympic hopeful Debbie Kent (Monica Creel), disappears after a savage shark attack. Eddie brings his mentally challenged brother Bobby (Blake Gibbons) for a weekend visit. Note: Blake Gibbons would later return to the series in season 5 as Riley Ferguson, a seismologist and love interest of Stephanie Holden (Alexandra Paul). Montage music: “After Venus” – Enya, “House Full of Reasons” – Jude Cole
40	19	"Lost Treasure of Tower 12"	Cliff Bole	Glenn A. Bruce & David Braff	April 27, 1992	2022
Two thieves, Beggs (Brian Patrick Clarke & Clark Stuart Fratkin), lose their loot under a lifeguard tower and Shauni is swept off her feet by eccentric beach poet Ian (Michael Bendetti). Montage music: “Women in Chains” – Tears for Fears, “Night and Day” – Cole Porter, “Sound of Your Voice” – 38 Special
41	20	"The Big Spill"	Cliff Bole	David Braff	May 4, 1992	2018
Former Baywatch lifeguard turned environmentalist Lane Brody (Jeff Lester) aims to expose corporate executive Mr. Drishler (James Sloyan) illegally dumping toxic waste. Montage music: “Another Nice Day in LA” – Eddie Money, “The Bug” – Dire Straits, “When the World Was Young” – John Cafferty and the Beaver Brown Band, “Different Destinations” – David Hallyday
42	21	"Game of Chance"	Georg Fenady	David Braff	May 11, 1992	2015
Harvey and Mitch pursue and capture disgruntled gambler turned high-seas pirate John Miles (Eric Waterhouse) who uses an amphibious vehicle prototype. Shauni quarrels with Robert over his disapproval of her relationship with Eddie. Notes: Jason Brooks played Brown Goodman in this episode. He would later appear as a regular cast member as Sean Monroe in the final two seasons of the series. Montage music: “Ooh La La” – David Hallyday, “The Horses” – Daryl Braithwaite
43	22	"Summer of '85"	Michael Berk	Michael Berk	May 18, 1992	2023
Shauni brings Eddie to visit fortune teller Rosalind (Toni Basil) who predicts that he will cross paths with his first love. When he finds her, Lorna Cosgrove (Michelle Rogers), at the marina, it complicates his relationship with Shauni and entangles him in a web of lies and an unsolved murder. Notes: Eddie's first love Lorna Cosgrove is portrayed by Michele Berk (credited as Michelle Rogers), wife of Baywatch executive producer Michael Berk. She would later feature in an episode of the third season of the show as Dr. Faye Taylor. Montage music: “About You” – David Hallyday

=== Season 3 (1992–1993) ===
No. overall	No. in season	Title	Directed by	Written by	Original release date	Prod. code
44	1	"River of No Return: Parts 1 & 2"	Douglas Schwartz	Michael Berk & Douglas Schwartz	September 14, 1992	3001
45	2	"River of No Return: Parts 1 & 2"	Douglas Schwartz	Michael Berk & Douglas Schwartz	September 14, 1992	3002
Mitch receives news of his uncle's death and recruits Hobie, Eddie and Shauni to trek to northern California's rugged gold country to claim his inheritance. They soon discover Uncle Alex may have found a legendary and valuable gold nugget known as the Golden Boot. Eddie and Shauni are having problems in their relationship due to Eddie accepting a year-long lifeguard exchange assignment in Australia. Meanwhile, Summer Quinn and her mother Jackie arrive in California to start a new life. Lifeguard recruit Matt Brody steps in to help Summer when she is confronted by Jackie's abusive ex-boyfriend who has tracked them from Pittsburgh. In search of Uncle Alex's treasure, the group becomes the target of the same two prospectors (Mickey Jones & Bill McKinney) who murdered Uncle Alex. The gang join former Baywatch lifeguard turned river guide C.J. Parker on a raft ride down river to search for Uncle Alex's hiding spot and must fend off multiple attacks by the looters. Notes: This is the first appearance of Pamela Anderson (as C.J. Parker), David Charvet (as Matt Brody), Nicole Eggert (as Summer Quinn), and Susan Anton (as Jackie Quinn). Eddie mentions that it was Chief Thorpe's recommendation that led to his acceptance into the lifeguard exchange program. Absent: Gregory Alan Williams as Garner Ellerbee, Kelly Slater as Jimmy Slade, Alexandra Paul as Stephanie Holden Montage music: “Poison Girl” – Chris Whitley, “All My Life” – Linda Ronstadt
46	3	"Tequila Bay"	Lyndon Chubbuck	David Braff	September 28, 1992	3004
A woman from Mitch's past, Stephanie Holden (Alexandra Paul in her first appearance), becomes one of his fellow lifeguards and stirs up memories for Mitch; Matt and Jimmy Slade (Kelly Slater in his first appearance) must contend with surfers wanting to take over part of the beach. Montage music: “Diamente” – Zucchero, “As Time Goes By” – Harry Nillson
47	4	"Rookie of the Year"	Gus Trikonis	Deborah Schwartz & Gregory J. Bonann	October 5, 1992	3003
The lifeguards compete against each other to determine who is the best; Stephanie and C.J. move in together but things get complicated for both of them. Note: Buzz Belmondo makes his first of several appearances as Guido Torzini. Montage music: “Color Me You” – Colorhaus, “Guardian of the Breath” – Howard Jones
48	5	"Pier Pressure"	Gus Trikonis	Deborah Schwartz & Douglas Schwartz	October 12, 1992	3005
Hobie weaves a web of lies to impress a girl Heather (Juliet Sorcey); Summer is humiliated by local girls (including Courtney Bremmer (Elizabeth Berkley)) when she mistakes an offhand invitation from Jimmy Slade for a date. Note: Jason Marsden features as Tony Valentino, a local kid involved in a fight who tries to get Hobie to lie for him. Montage music: “Drag” – Steve Wynn, “One Summer” – Daryl Braithwaite
49	6	"Showdown at Malibu Beach High"	Douglas Schwartz	Michael Berk & Douglas Schwartz	October 19, 1992	3012
The love strings between Courtney (Elizabeth Berkley), Slade and Summer are pulled tight; C.J. accepts a position at Malibu Beach High; Garner tires of work on the beach beat. Montage music: “Young Love” – The Outfield, “I Just Wanna Make Love to You” – Rhythm Syndicate, “Freedom” – Noiseworks
50	7	"Point Doom"	Gregory J. Bonann	Daniel M. Peterson & David Trim	October 26, 1992	3009
Matt meets a motorist, Jessie Majors (Jennifer Campbell) and they go on a date. Matt drives his motorcycle on the cliffs above Malibu and challenges Hudson; Mitch trains to beat Stephanie with Garner as his coach. Montage music: “Who Do You Think You Are? – Sass Jordan, “I’m Too Sexy” – Right Said Fred, “Save Me Tonight” – Giant
51	8	"Princess of Tides"	Parker Stevenson	Michael Berk & Peter Kiwitt	November 2, 1992	3008
C.J. is almost run over in a race, causing Mitch and Newmie to finish; Lewiston is engaged to a princess; Catherine's bodyguard Roland kidnaps her. Montage music: “In the Hands of Time” – Hardine, “Killer” – Seal
52	9	"Masquerade"	Heather Hill	I.C. Rapoport	November 9, 1992	3011
Mitch and Stephanie go undercover as two wealthy individuals to stop murderous pirates from taking over Baywatch. Montage music: “Evening” – Pat Benatar
53	10	"Lifeguards Can't Jump"	Gregory J. Bonann	Lloyd J. Schwartz	November 16, 1992	3010
Mitch and Garner work with the local street bookie (Lou Rawls) and go undercover as street basketball players to discover the truth about a player's mysterious death from an alleged drug overdose. A newlywed groom on his honeymoon (Jeff Altman) makes a date with C.J. Montage music: “Running Wild” – Soup Dragons, “Taste of Love” – Jimmy Jamison, “Good Times” – Arc Angels
54	11	"Dead of Summer"	Cliff Bole	Terry Erwin	November 23, 1992	3006
The governor holds a speech on the pier; three bad guys plan to blow the pier into pieces with a boat. Garner meets his sister's old friend Wendi again. Guest star Randolph Mantooth. Montage music: “Class War” – Blackbird, “Reach Out” – The Zoo, “Don’t Play with My Heart”, “Loney without Your Love”, “Don’t Stop the Beat” – TAG
55	12	"A Matter of Life and Death"	Sidney Hayers	Gary Capo & Julian Whatley & Michael Berk	January 4, 1993	3007
Mitch's parents Irene (Anne Jeffreys) and Al (Joseph Campanella) come to visit; Mitch's father wants him to take over his architectural firm; Summer must tell Jackie about her horrible nightmares. Montage music: “Caribbean Blue” – Enya, “Life is a Highway” – Tom Cochran
56	13	"Island of Romance"	Gregory J. Bonann	Michael Berk & Deborah Schwartz	January 11, 1993	3015
C.J. and Stephanie go to Catalina for their women's weekend, but the trip does not go according to plan; Hobie and Mitch agree to hire a housekeeper. Montage music: “Sighs Smell of Farewell” – The Cocteau Twins, “I Just Wanna Be With You” – Chris Rea
57	14	"Strangers Among Us"	Alan Myerson	John Whelpley	January 18, 1993	3019
A diamond smuggler looks for loot he has hidden in one of Slade's surfboards; a group searching for extra-terrestrials drives the lifeguards crazy. Note: Michele Berk (wife of Baywatch executive producer Michael Berk) makes her second appearance in the series, featuring in this episode as Dr. Faye Taylor. She portrayed Eddie's first love Lorna Cosgrove in season 2. Montage music: “Around the World” – The Weathermen, “Bare” – Geoffrey Williams
58	15	"Vacation: Part 1"	Gus Trikonis	David Braff	January 25, 1993	3013
After the Baywatch crew rescues the daughter of a cruise ship captain, he invites them all to be guests on the next voyage. Meanwhile, henchmen help their crime boss escape during prison transit and board the cruise ship to leave the country. On the ship, Guido hatches a plan to woo a wealthy widow (Diana Bellamy) in hopes to gain funding for his new business. C.J. has a relapse with a dormant gambling addiction. Stephanie has a dangerous encounter with the criminals. Montage music: “A Kissed Out Float Boat” – The Cocteau Twins, “All I Need Is You” – Blue Train, “Heaven’s Gate” – Toni Childs
59	16	"Vacation: Part 2"	Gus Trikonis	David Braff	February 1, 1993	3014
Mitch and Stephanie fight the elements to stay alive drifting in the ocean. Matt comes to C.J.'s aid when she gets in over her head at the casino. Summer sounds the alarm for missing Mitch and Stephanie, and the ship is commandeered by the criminals. Montage music: (See Vacation Part 1)
60	17	"The Tower"	Gregory J. Bonann	Deborah Schwartz & Michael Berk	February 8, 1993	3024
A homicidal psychopath escapes from prison and takes Stephanie and Summer hostage. Mitch has to get clever in order to perform the rescue. Montage music: “Chase the Clouds” – The Rembrandts, “Sentinel” - Tubular Bells
61	18	"Stakeout at Surfrider Beach"	Parker Stevenson	Story by : Jim Hilton; Teleplay by : David Braff	February 15, 1993	3018
An exotic actress (Fabiana Udenio) is stalked by two crooks, requiring the help of Mitch. Guido enlists the help of Summer and C.J. to convince his visiting mother (Rhoda Gemignani) that he is a lifeguard. Montage music: “Working Man” – Glenn Frey, “Damn I Wish I Was Your Lover” – Sophie B. Hawkins
62	19	"Shattered: Part 1"	Douglas Schwartz	Deborah Schwartz	April 19, 1993	3017
Mitch suffers a paralyzing injury during a rescue. At the rehabilitation hospital he meets his spunky physical therapist Sophie Jones (Kiki Shepard) and befriends Jason, a young paraplegic from Chicago who is secretly under witness protection. A mob boss (Antony Ponzini) sends his Chicago PD mole Detective Riddick (Matt McColm) to L.A. to kill Jason. Note: Robert Pine features as Mitch's his doctor. Montage music: “Right Till the End” – Terry Reid, “5th of July” – Terry Reid
63	20	"Shattered: Part 2"	Douglas Schwartz	Deborah Schwartz	April 26, 1993	3023
Mitch struggles with physical therapy and the thought of never walking again, leading him to lash out at Hobie. The Baywatch lifeguards and Hobie separately reminisce memories of Mitch as an active part of their lives. Detective Riddick kidnaps Jason and Mitch must follow clues to rescue him before it's too late, even while still bound to his own wheelchair. Montage music: (See Shattered Part 1)
64	21	"Kicks"	Michael Berk	Michelle Berk & Trish Garland & Peter Kiwitt	May 3, 1993	3020
Matt competes in kickboxing with Mitch as his coach; Mitch meets Michael Branson again; C.J. has the opportunity to become a model. Montage music: “Here Comes Trouble” - Bad Company, “Love in the 21st Century” – Glenn Frey
65	22	"Fatal Exchange"	Paul Cajero	David Braff	May 10, 1993	3021
Strange occurrences take place at Baywatch after the arrival of a new Australian lifeguard (Trevor Goddard). Note: Trevor Goddard makes the second appearance by a main actor in Mortal Kombat (1995 film) after Cary-Hiroyuki Tagawa appeared in season 2. Montage music: “Take Me” – Blackbird, “Senza Una Donna” – Zucchero and P. Yound

=== Season 4 (1993–1994) ===
No. overall	No. in season	Title	Directed by	Written by	Original release date	Prod. code
66	1	"Race Against Time: Parts 1 & 2"	Gregory J. Bonann	Michael Berk & Deborah Schwartz	September 20, 1993	4001
67	2	"Race Against Time: Parts 1 & 2"	Gregory J. Bonann	Michael Berk & Deborah Schwartz	September 20, 1993	4002
Gayle surprises Mitch and Hobie with a new fiancé, Ken. On the way to their wedding in Mexico, Ken's private plane crashes into the ocean, requiring rescue by Mitch and the Baywatch lifeguards. Matt's father repossesses Matt's motorcycle; Jackie has problems with the renovation of her Summer Place restaurant. Note: Michelle Williams makes her on-screen debut in a small speaking role as Hobie's classmate Bridget Bowers. Montage music: “Wheels in Motion” – Jimmy Barnes, “Searchin’ My Soul” - Vonda Shepard, “I Would Die For You” – Jann Arden, “Hungry Town” – Big Pig
68	3	"Lover's Cove"	Gus Trikonis	Steven Barnes	September 27, 1993	4004
Hobie falls in love with a new girl (Anndi McAfee) in junior lifeguards; Mitch and Jackie have a number of interrupted dates; Matt and Summer discover that they love each other. Thinking he is romantic, Hobie takes the girl on jetski to a cove near a seaside monastery to kiss her as the bells toll, but they get caught in a dangerous current. After rescuing them, Mitch reveals to Hobie that his love interest has a terminal illness and was enrolled by Baywatch as a result of the Make a Wish Foundation. Montage music: “Hunny Bunny” – Book of Love, “Once in a Lifetime” – Sarah Brightman, “River of Time” – Laura Christy
69	4	"Blindside"	Douglas Schwartz	Deborah Schwartz	October 4, 1993	4008
Cort returns to Baywatch to finally plant roots, but while rekindling an old romance with C.J. she becomes worried about his eyesight. A boardwalk "freak show" attraction features a very tall man (Giant Gonzalez) who befriends Hobie. Note: Former Los Angeles Dodgers player Steve Garvey makes a special guest appearance as Dr. Corey. Montage music: “Spirit” – Beloved, “Pelican Man” – Jimmy Hart
70	5	"Sky Rider"	Lyndon Chubbuck	Sherri Ziff & Michael Berk	October 11, 1993	4010
Matt and Slade have a confrontation on the waves over Summer and decide to have a huge bungee-jumping contest; Garner and Mitch chase pickpockets. Montage music: “Treaty” – Yothu Yindi, “Book of Days” – Enya
71	6	"Tentacles: Part 1"	Lyndon Chubbuck	Teleplay by : Michael Berk; Story by : Sherri Ziff & Michael Berk	October 18, 1993	4016
Matt and Slade compete for Summer's affections by surfing. Mitch encounters a desperate woman who needs help for her boyfriend. Meanwhile Summer, Matt and Slade all go into an underwater cave searching for Matt's surfboard when Summer is pulled down and nearly killed by an octopus. C.J. tries to help Summer overcome her eating disorder. Montage music: “Fly” – His Boy Elroy
72	7	"Tentacles: Part 2"	Gregory J. Bonann	Teleplay by : Michael Berk; Story by : Sherri Ziff & Michael Berk	October 25, 1993	4023
Stephanie's sister, Caroline (Yasmine Bleeth), arrives at Baywatch with exciting news, but her joy is shattered by a cataclysmic event. Mitch finds himself at the mercy of a wounded but dangerous adversary. Montage music: “Water x 3” – Sun 60
73	8	"Submersion"	Gregory J. Bonann	Michael Berk	November 1, 1993	4020
Mitch must make a difficult decision when he must choose which boy to rescue from the ocean, and the boy he does not save first ends up in a coma. Note: Donny Most makes a special guest appearance as Roger Clark. Montage music: “Ordinary Day” – Jim Jacobson
74	9	"Ironman Buchannon"	Douglas Schwartz	David Braff	November 8, 1993	4003
Mitch tries to show he can still compete with younger men by taking part in the Ironman competition; Matt's late hours make Summer suspicious. Standing in for a tired Matt, Summer Quinn is knocked unconscious attempting a rescue. Montage music: “Dream On” – Beloved, “You Want It All” - The Weathermen
75	10	"Tower of Power"	Gus Trikonis	David Braff	November 15, 1993	4007
A local gang causes trouble for a new lifeguard at Baywatch. C.J. befriends a local magician–escape artist who tries to impress her with a dangerous stunt. Montage music: “Elemental” – Tears for Fears, “Just Another Day” – Jon Secada
76	11	"The Child Inside"	Douglas Schwartz	Deborah Schwartz	November 22, 1993	4015
Baywatch is host to the Special Olympics and a long-time friend of Mitch arrives to help oversee the event. There is a special appearance by gymnastics great Mary Lou Retton. Montage music: “The Best Is Yet to Come” – David Hasselhoff, “The Child Inside” – Robin and Judithe Randall
77	12	"Second Time Around"	Lyndon Chubbuck	Garner Simmons	January 17, 1994	4006
Matt rescues a woman (Jennifer Campbell) following a jet ski accident and realizes he knows her from before. Things get complicated for Matt as the woman pleads with him to help her fend off a rejected suitor from her past. Note: Michelle Williams makes her second appearance in the series in an uncredited role as a groupie in Hobie's imagination music video sequence. Montage music: “Sail Across the Water” – Jane Sibury, “Rock On” – David Essex, “Tighter Tighter” – David Hasselhoff
78	13	"The Red Knights"	Cliff Bole	Elroy Schwartz	January 24, 1994	4005
A reunion of older lifeguards stirs up painful memories for Ben. Jackie's big chance to impress a local music executive could be damaged by problems that are unexpected. Montage music: “Ordinary World” – Duran Duran, “Anything You Ask” – Susan Anton
79	14	"Coronado Del Soul: Part 1"	Gus Trikonis	David Braff	January 31, 1994	4011
Four Baywatch lifeguards travel to San Diego to demonstrate the usage of the Scarabs and jetskis to the local county lifeguards. During their stay at the Hotel Del Coronado, Summer experiences strange occurrences and discovers there is a legend of a ghost haunting by a former guest. Meanwhile C.J. becomes enamored with a dolphin trainer at SeaWorld San Diego. Montage music: Original music by Cory/John, “Running into the Sun” – Noel, “State of Grace” – Tia Carrere
80	15	"Coronado Del Soul: Part 2"	Gus Trikonis	David Braff	February 7, 1994	4012
Stephanie, with the aid of the Coast Guard, searches frantically for the missing Mitch and Buzz. Summer and the other lifeguards find out the truth behind the ghost tales at the hotel. Montage music: (See Coronado Del Soul: Part 1)
81	16	"Mirror, Mirror"	Douglas Schwartz	Deborah Schwartz	February 14, 1994	4018
A woman (Carrie-Anne Moss) who has dissociative identity disorder becomes obsessed with Mitch and takes him hostage. Montage music: Original music by Cory/John
82	17	"The Falcon Manifesto"	Charles Braverman	Michele Berk & Susan Hamilton Brin	February 21, 1994	4025
A woman on the run from a deadly man finds comfort and protection when she meets Mitch; Matt pushes for a houseboat but Summer stands firm against the ideas. Montage music: “Looking For Something” – Vonda Shepard
83	18	"Rescue Bay"	Gregory J. Bonann	Steven Barnes	February 28, 1994	4019
TV producer Don Brand (Jeff Altman) becomes excited with the potential of a series centered around the lifeguards and law enforcement at a California beach. Stephanie becomes jealous when a role based on her is given to C.J. Montage music: “Lie To Me” - Paul Norton, “I Want You” – Nikoli Steen, “Art of Living” – The Boomers
84	19	"Western Exposure"	Gregory J. Bonann	Deborah Schwartz	April 25, 1994	4028
A famous country musician (Ricky Van Shelton) makes a stop on his tour in attempt to find his estranged wife and son in L.A. The Baywatch lifeguards agree to help with the search. Hobie's love interest (Jessica Wesson) has a crush on Mitch. Notes: Martina McBride appears in a special guest role as C.J.'s friend and aspiring musician Sadie Jennings. Jimmy Hart features as Jesse Lee Harris' road manager. Montage music: “Talking to God” – Ricky Van Shelton, “My Baby Loves Me” – Martina McBride, “Life #9” – Martina McBride, “Where Was I” – Ricky Van Shelton
85	20	"The Life You Save"	Michael Berk	Michael Berk	May 2, 1994	4024
When the Baywatch gang find out that their jobs are in jeopardy due to budget cuts, everyone decide to volunteer as civilian lifeguards. Mitch and Stephanie organize a meeting with the budget commissioners to introduce them to past rescue survivors in hopes they will be convinced of the necessity of Baywatch staff. Note: Several past guest stars reprise their roles from previous episodes to tell their tales of rescue, including Nikki Cox. Montage music: “Sunshine Like You” – The Waterlillies, “Climb On” – Shawn Colvin
86	21	"Trading Places"	Paul Cajero	David Braff	May 9, 1994	4017
Stephanie participates in a cross-role training with the US Coast Guard and becomes attracted to a rescue swimmer who must help her overcome her fear of helicopters. Montage music: “Stand Up” – Jimmy Barnes
87	22	"Guys & Dolls"	Cliff Bole	David Braff	May 16, 1994	4021
Matt rescues a woman (A. J. Langer) from the ocean and tries to get her reacquainted with her dying father (Dick Van Patten) but she refuses; Stephanie falls for her Coast Guard partner. Note: This was A. J. Langer's second appearance in the series, first appearing in season 2 as teenager Caroline Larkin who claimed to have had relations with Eddie in his lifeguard tower. Montage music: “Beautiful” – Babble, “Dream a Perfect Dream” – Tia Carrere

=== Season 5 (1994–1995) ===
No. overall	No. in season	Title	Directed by	Written by	Original release date	Prod. code
88	1	"Livin' on the Fault Line: Part 1"	Gregory J. Bonann	Michael Berk	September 26, 1994	5001
The team arrives to Los Angeles in order to place an underwater seismometer in the Malibu fault. Stephanie agrees to be their safety officer, because she is in love with the team leader Reily Ferguson. Reily is an expert oceanographer and free-diver. It is revealed that Summer left Baywatch to enroll at Penn State University. Logan and Matt get into an argument after resuscitating a drowning girl. Gordon Jump guest stars. Montage music: “Off the Hook” – Peter Frampton, “You Can Run” – Jeremy Jackson, “I’m Gonna Miss You” – Jeremy Jackson, “Meanwhile” – 3rd Matinee
89	2	"Livin' on the Fault Line: Part 2"	Gregory J. Bonann	Michael Berk	October 3, 1994	5002
The big earthquake was a 7.2 on the Richter scale. While Stephanie is rescuing Max and Tom on the surface, Riley is trapped underwater under some rocks, Jackie is in big trouble as her trailer is about to go off the cliff and Mitch rescues Hobie in the garage just before the big heavy boat engine is about to fall down on him. Montage music: (See Livin' on the Fault Line: Part 1)
90	3	"Aftershock"	Gus Trikonis	David Braff	October 15, 1994	5003
Gayle and Mitch rekindle their romance and decide to get remarried. Matt's distrust of Logan leads to continued quarrel and punishment. Note: Mila Kunis features in a small role as a student who flags down Stephanie when her classmates need rescue. Montage music: “Summer of Love” – David Hasselhoff, “Return to Me” – October Project
91	4	"Baja Run"	Douglas Schwartz	Deborah Schwartz	October 22, 1994	5004
Cort returns to Los Angeles after a year in Mexico; Mitch and Cort participate in the Baja run; Caroline chooses Logan over Matt; Matt soon falls for C.J. Montage music: “LaBamba” – Los Lobos. “Silver” – The Williams Brothers
92	5	"Air Buchannon"	Roy Campanella II	David Braff	October 29, 1994	5005
Mitch and Stephanie enjoy a 24-hour shift together and during their time on duty they have a deep heart-to-heart concerning the possibility of dating again. Montage music: “The Limit” – Jim Jacobson, “Everyone’s a Star” – Francis Dunnery, “Lessons of Love” – Lea Solanga
93	6	"Short Sighted"	Douglas Schwartz	Deborah Schwartz	November 5, 1994	5006
Logan earns the title "Rookie of the Year" after completing rookie school; Hobie's friend's father, a dwarf, almost drowns while trying to save a girl and her dog. Montage music: “Ri Na Cruinne” – Clanned, “Best of Whatever You Are” – Robin and Judithe Randall
94	7	"Someone to Baywatch Over You"	Reza Badiyi	Kimmer Ringwald	November 12, 1994	5007
A cynical, female FBI agent goes undercover as a lifeguard in Mitch's tower to catch an escaped convict. Guest star: Kathleen Kinmont Montage music: “Cantaloop” – US3, “If You Go” – Jon Secada
95	8	"KGAS, the Groove-Yard of Solid Gold"	Charles Winkler	Reuben Leder	November 19, 1994	5009
Former reporter Kaye Morgan (Pamela Bach) holds the grand opening of her new restaurant on the beach called the Sandy Cay Cafe (formerly Jackie's Summer Place). For extra publicity, she allows a radio DJ (Jeff Garlin) to broadcast live on site, promoting a scavenger hunt with a $100,000 prize. When the contest attracts thousands of people to the beach looking to get rich, Mitch and Garner find themselves with their hands full, while even Matt and C.J. join in on the hunt. Montage music: “Summer of Love” – The Beach Boys, “You Can Get It If You Really Want It” – Desmond Dekker, “Daydream” – Sarah Vaughn
96	9	"Red Wind"	Gregory J. Bonann	Eric Blakeney	November 26, 1994	5015
Destiny Desimone (Lisa Stahl) returns to Baywatch to warn Mitch about an astrological alignment that will lead to outlandish behavior around Southern California, which C.J. is very leery of. A beautiful woman Kim (Bobbie Phillips) starts showing up at Mitch's tower, and eventually reveals that he rescued her from the water 11 years prior, and she hasn't stopped thinking about him. Now that she's engaged, she's come to see if she's making a mistake. Meanwhile, her nerdy fiancée Albert Romero (Geraldo Rivera in a special appearance) devotes himself to learning to be more like Mitch, so she will go through with the marriage. A crazed man Bill Cooper (John O'Hurley) sends Caroline into the water to save his drowning daughter. While the Baywatch lifeguards find no trace of the girl, Mitch interviews Bill and determines she is more likely just missing, and calls off the search. After angrily confronting Mitch, telling him he made the wrong decision, Caroline sees Bill enter the water, again searching for his daughter, requiring Caroline to rescue him and find out the truth about the girl. Notes: Lisa Stahl makes her second and final appearance in the series, but she would later reprise her Destiny role as a recurring character in the spinoff series Baywatch Nights. Montage music: “What Silence Knows” – Shara Nelson, “Don’t Force It” – Arrow, “Adouma” – Angelique Kidjo
97	10	"I Spike"	Gregory J. Bonann	Michael Berk	November 28, 1994	5008
While Baywatch leadership assesses the usefulness of a new hovercraft, Mitch becomes enamored with the manufacturer's representative Tracy Dodsworth (Rebecca Carlton, credited as Rebekah Carlton-Luff). Garner faces his fears with an attempt to sing on stage at a jazz club. Happenstance allows Matt to team up with a pro for a volleyball tournament; C.J. expresses her disdain for a new oil drilling project near Zuma Beach. Notes: Karch Kiraly and Kent Steffes make a special guest appearance. Montage music: “Knock Me Down” – Jimmy Barnes, “I’ll Drown In My Tears” – Greg Alan-Williams
98	11	"Silent Night, Baywatch Night: Part 1"	Douglas Schwartz	Deborah Schwartz	December 5, 1994	5011
As Christmas nears, Mitch and Tracy are falling in love. The Baywatch gang goes through decorations and Tracy laments that she always wanted a white Christmas with snow, and this may be her last chance. After stealing cash from Sid (Cliff Emmich), a local bookie, con-woman Kyla Jennings (Paula Trickey) gets arrested, and her partner-in-crime daughter Joey (Ashley Gorrell) (posing as a boy) gets Mitch and Hobie let her stay with them. She then enlists Hobie in a scheme to secretly raise money for her mother's bail, meanwhile the bookie's goon is still after Joey to recover the money they stole. Matt reveals to C.J. that the holiday season depresses him due to having no happy Christmas memories. He later meets a group of dwarfs vacationing on the beach, including Benny (Danny Woodburn) and Debbie (Debbie Lee Carrington), and begins to suspect they could really be Santa's elves. While working on Christmas activities for homeless children, C.J. meets Father Sam Ryan (Julian Stone) and comes to believe he has developed romantic feelings for her. Notes: Following her appearance in this two-part episode, Ashley Gorrell would return to reprise her role as Joey in season 6. Montage music: “Let It Snow” – Leon Redbone, “Santa Baby”, “Have Yourself a Merry Christmas”, and “Winter Wonderland” as instrumentals, “Black Coffee” – Angela Teek
99	12	"Silent Night, Baywatch Night: Part 2"	Douglas Schwartz	Deborah Schwartz	December 12, 1994	5012
While fleeing from Sid's goon, Joey falls into the ocean, requiring rescue by Hobie and the Baywatch lifeguards. A conversation with Garner allows Mitch to determine who Joey's mother is and reunite them. When Father Sam hints that he is considering leaving the priesthood, C.J. worries it's because he has fallen in love with her. Mitch arranges a private date night on the beach with Tracy. Matt becomes more and more convinced the group of dwarfs he met on the beach are Santa's elves. Mitch surprises Tracy with a foam snow party on the beach. Montage music: (See Silent Night, Baywatch Night: Part 1)
100	13	"Rubber Ducky"	Gregory J. Bonann	David Braff	January 30, 1995	5010
The 100th episode of the series. With his visa expiring in two weeks, Logan continues to court Kathleen Huntington (Annette McCarthy), the rich heiress that he sees as a possible way to stay in the US, through marriage. Preferring to be with Caroline, he partners with his old friend Gator from Tasmania in a rubber ducky (inflatable rescue boat) race, planning to use the prize money for an expedited green card. After introducing Tracy to his mother Irene (Anne Jeffreys), Mitch expresses to Tracy that he thinks it's time for his mother to move on from the death of her husband, his father. But when Irene begins to be courted by her old high school classmate and original Baywatch lifeguard Cliff Odom (Robert Colbert), Mitch is bothered because of Odom's playboy past. Being old friends from Australia, Gator greets Tracy and asks about her relationship with Mitch, and if she has "told him" yet about some secret she has, suggesting Mitch has a right to know. Montage music: “Mystery Game” – Clanned, “Celtic Warrior” – Stephen Housden
101	14	"Homecoming"	Gus Trikonis	Steven Barnes	February 6, 1995	5022
Returning from their long sailing trip, Stephanie and Riley make one last stop in the Channel Islands. Soon after, their boat is stolen by a frantic environmental terrorist who takes Stephanie hostage. Meanwhile, Garner falls for a young lifeguard, and Mitch decides to play matchmaker by telling each that the other has a hearing disability. Montage music: “Jebbas” - David Foster, “Generator” – Royal Jelly
102	15	"Seize the Day"	Douglas Schwartz	Deborah Schwartz	February 13, 1995	5018
Mitch discovers that Tracy is terminally ill and tries to make the best of their short time together; Logan and Caroline confront two reckless drivers. Montage music: “Days of Our Love” - David Hasselhoff, “If I Could Touch You One More Time” – Robin and Judithe Randall
103	16	"A Little Help"	Michael Berk	Susan Hamilton Brin & Michele Rogers Berk	February 20, 1995	5019
Hobie seeks advice from a radio station on how to help ease his father's pain over losing Tracy; Caroline saves a person who has AIDS.
104	17	"Father's Day"	Gregory J. Bonann	Michael Berk & Tanquil Lisa Collins	February 27, 1995	5014
Logan has recurring flashbacks of a traumatic childhood incident; after his father dies, Mitch learns that his father appreciated his job as a lifeguard. The end credits contain a dedication to the memory of Dr. Archer Gordon, who was one of the pioneers in developing the modern CPR technique. Montage music: “A Gentle Place" - Clanned
105	18	"Fire with Fire"	Michael Preece	David Braff	April 24, 1995	5021
Andy Jamieson (Tim Wrightman), a part-time sheriff and old friend of Mitch, arrives at Baywatch wanting to fill out some time as a part-time lifeguard. Stephanie is apprehensive when she finds he is aggressive toward vagrants on the beach. Meanwhile, Logan tells Caroline that he's annulled his marriage to the heiress, and asks a reluctant Stephanie for help to acquire a green card. Montage music: “The Fire” – Jim Jacobson, “Here We Go” – Stakka Bo
106	19	"Deep Trouble"	Gus Trikonis	John Allen Nelson & Max Strom	May 1, 1995	5013
Matt and C.J. find John D. Cort, now homeless, with his eyesight condition progressed to near blindness, sleeping under C.J.'s tower. C.J. questions his presence, which also brings up some jealousy in Matt. Meanwhile, Kaye introduces Mitch and Hobie to Nick, a 10-year-old boy dying from leukemia who desperately needs a bone marrow transplant within 48 hours. Mitch and Cort attempt to track down Nick's older brother brother Jamie, an archaeologist diver who has been kidnapped with his wife (Debbe Dunning) by a drug lord (special appearance by Richard Lynch) and his men looking to find a stash of narcotics lost in a wreckage 100 feet on the ocean floor. Notes: Guest Debbe Dunning and Pamela Anderson both had recurring roles as the "Tool Time girl" on Home Improvement. Special guest star Mike Piazza appears as himself. Montage music: “Falling Forward" - Julia Fordham, " I Love You...I'll Kill You" - Enigma
107	20	"Promised Land"	Paul Cajero	David Braff	May 8, 1995	5017
Mitch is injured as he attempts to track down the sister of a young Chinese girl he rescued only to find out that the woman he rescued is pregnant and cannot return to China for fear of losing the child. Montage music: “Inside Job” – Michael Lanning, “Boom Papa Boom” Jimy Vaughan
108	21	"The Runaways"	L. Lewis Stout	David Braff	May 15, 1995	5020
Kaye hires Molly (Jayne Collins), a young Englishwoman busking at the beach, as a waitress at the Sandy Cay Cafe. Kit Evans (Amy Wheaton) is a young teenage runaway girl whom Molly has taken under her wing. In addition to wanting to be a famous singer, Molly also has a possessive fiancé from England shadowing her. Meanwhile, British businessman and daredevil stuntman Richard Branson (in a guest starring role as himself) arrives to set a new world record by water skiing from behind a blimp, and Mitch and Matt have to handle the safety for the event. Stephanie begins to get on Caroline's nerves by being an overbearing older sister. Note: Little Richard guest stars as a cook at the cafe, and Gladys Knight makes a brief cameo as herself. Montage music: “Until the Last Teardrop” – David Hasselhoff and Jayne Collins, “No Turning Back” – Jayne Collins, “Good Golly Miss Molly” – Little Richard
109	22	"Wet and Wild"	Paul Lazarus	Kimmer Ringwald	May 22, 1995	5016
Hobie and his friends are enamored with a motorcycle daredevil Johnny Danger (Ellis Edwards) who encourages the teens to drink alcohol, leading to a near drowning. A new lifeguard named Neely Capshaw (Heather Campbell) has been transferred to Baywatch from Huntington. She requests to work with Matt, and then comes onto him at their tower, leading Matt to push her away, saying C.J. and his relationship with her are important to him. Later, while on duty alone, Neely ducks into her tower to drink alcohol, causing her to miss a rescue which Matt has to make on her behalf. After he reports the incident to Mitch, Neely claims that Matt came onto her and threatened her job if she didn't sleep with him. This leaves Mitch no choice but to ask Matt to take a leave of absence, and C.J. plots to secretly record Neely admitting her lie. Notes: This was Heather Campbell's only appearance as Neely, as she was replaced in the role by Gena Lee Nolan in future episodes. Campbell later made a featured appearance in the spinoff series Baywatch Nights as a client for Mitch's detective agency. Ellis Edwards would go on to make two more appearances in the series, in season 6 as a drunk boat driver, and uncredited in season 7 as a man on a boat. Montage music: “Our World, Our Times” – Alannah Myles, “Sun’s Gonna Rise” – Sass Jordan

=== Season 6 (1995–1996) ===
No. overall	No. in season	Title	Directed by	Written by	Original release date	Prod. code
110	1	"Trapped Beneath the Sea, Part 1"	Gregory J. Bonann	Michael Berk	September 25, 1995	6003
Stephanie recruits competitive swimmer Cody Madison (David Chokachi) as a new lifeguard and desires to coach him into the Olympics. While taking credit for his partner Gator's designs, Logan attempts to get funding for their fashion business by wooing Beth (Kelly Packard), the young daughter of Edward Campfield (Jim McMullan), a wealthy investor. Neely Capshaw (Gena Lee Nolan) returns to Baywatch and is greeted with a hostile reception from Caroline and C.J. due to her false sexual harassment claims against Matt [in the series' prior season]. Mitch reveals to Hobie his childhood dream of becoming a private investigator (foreshadowing the spinoff series Baywatch Nights.) An old naval mine collides with a condemned offshore oil rig, causing it to explode and sink into the ocean depths with people inside. Notes: Gena Lee Nolan replaces Heather Campbell in the role of Neely. Richard Hatch guest stars as environmental expert Tom. Kelly Packard makes her fourth appearance in the series, first appearing in season 2 as Joanie in the two-part episode "The Trophy," and later as an unnamed girl. She would later appear as a series regular beginning in season 8. Montage music: “Casablanca” – The Ambush, “Cursum Perficio” – Enya
111	2	"Trapped Beneath the Sea, Part 2"	Gregory J. Bonann	Michael Berk	October 2, 1995	6004
Stuck in the sunken oil rig, Neely and Cody work to rescue the two young couples who were trespassing. Mitch and other Baywatch lifeguards join forces with the Coast Guard to create a way into the structure and bring everyone out before the air supply is depleted. Neely's heroics impress Mitch and Cody, but Stephanie and Caroline are still not thrilled about her being on the staff. Mitch reveals his new Acura NSX-T belongs to a detective agency. Montage music: (See Trapped Beneath the Sea, Part 1)
112	3	"Hot Stuff"	Georg Fenady	David Braff	October 9, 1995	6008
Logan becomes jealous when Cody begins to flirt with Caroline during and after rescues; Neely wants to break away from manning the switchboard and become a tower lifeguard; Kaye asks Hobie to help volunteer a group of four young blind children she is looking after at a blind school; all of Baywatch springs into action when a wildfire spreads along the coast, and Mitch has to rescue Hobie and one of the blind children who wandered off. Notes: Beverly Mitchell and Mila Kunis feature as two of the blind children. (This was Kunis' second appearance in the series, featuring in season 5 as a young student Annie.) Montage music: “Crazy Cool” – Paula Abdul, Original music by Cory/John
113	4	"Surf's Up"	Gus Trikonis	David Braff	October 16, 1995	6005
A popular surf spot becomes polluted from storm drain runoff, causing a protest on the beach. While there, Stephanie runs into her ex-husband Billy Foster (Michael Spound), rekindling old feelings between the two, but making Caroline leery. Mitch recruits The Beach Boys to perform a benefit concert to raise funding for diverting the runoff to a sewage treatment plant. Neely flirts with Cody while convincing him to let her teach him to surf, making Caroline suspicious of her intentions. Montage music: “Surfer Girl”, California Girls”, “Fun, Fun, Fun”, “Don’t Worry Baby”, “Summer of Love” all by The Beach Boys
114	5	"To Everything There Is a Season"	Douglas Schwartz	Deborah Schwartz	October 23, 1995	6007
Mitch's mother Irene (Anne Jeffreys) visits and it is discovered that she has Alzheimer's disease; Stephanie helps train Cody for the Olympics; Logan continues to be insanely jealous with Cody hanging around Caroline, while the manipulative sociopath Neely sees an opportunity to use their feud to her own advantage by continuing to taunt Logan with some damaging information she has about him. Montage music: “Stranger In Paradise” – Kourosh, “Only a Matter of Time” – Robin and Judithe Randall
115	6	"Leap of Faith"	Douglas Schwartz	Deborah Schwartz	October 30, 1995	6002
C.J. returns from her trip to visit Matt in France. She goes with Stephanie and Caroline on a teamwork building excursion for female junior lifeguards on Catalina Island. Despite not being invited, Neely shows up and continues to antagonize C.J. and Caroline. When two of the girls, Erika (Lindsay Parker) and Lauren Taylor (Anndi McAfee) wander off and get pulled into a submerged cavern, the team has to work together to rescue them. Meanwhile, Mitch receives a request to appear at the reading of a will. The attorney Mr. Samuels (Paul Comi) reveals that Kyla Jennings [the con-woman from season 5] passed away in a car accident, and left custody of her daughter Joey (Ashley Gorrell) to Mitch. Worried that he and Hobie ultimately won't accept her, she determines to become a real hero lifeguard like them by attempting a rescue. Notes: Ashley Gorrell reprises her role as Joey Jennings from season 5 in the first of a three-appearance story arc. Montage music: “Garden of Eden” – Paula Cole, “I’m Always Here” – Jimmi Jackson
116	7	"Face of Fear"	Douglas Schwartz	Deborah Schwartz	November 6, 1995	6001
Hobie and his friends almost drown while surfing in a dangerous part of the beach; Caroline befriends an ex-jockey who is pretending to be blind. Montage music: Original music by Cory/John, “You Painted Smile” – Bryan Adams
117	8	"Hit and Run"	Gus Trikonis	Grant Rosenberg	November 13, 1995	6009
C.J. rescues a sea lion caught in a net on the beach and adopts him, creating a mess both at headquarters and the apartment. When Logan is unable to get anyone to lend him a car to get to a meeting for his fashion business, he takes Cody's car without permission. While on the road, he is involved in an accident and provides aid to the other driver, but tells police that he was only walking, and the driver of Cody's car ran off. Still frustrated with her assignment on switchboard, Neely becomes convinced that Stephanie is trying to get her to quit. When a call comes in for backup on a rescue, she goes herself. After Cody is arrested on the charge of hit and run as the owner of the vehicle, he finds Logan's bracelet in his car and confronts him as the thief. Mitch and Stephanie get into an argument over having his lifeguarding hours cut back due to his second career with the detective agency (on Baywatch Nights). Hobie suggests they settle things through a paintball competition. During the match, Cody and Logan get into a fistfight, leading to Cody nearly falling off a cliff. Montage music: “Could I Be Your Girl” – Jann Arden
118	9	"Home Is Where the Heat Is"	L. Lewis Stout	Michael Berk	November 20, 1995	6020
Matt Brody (David Charvet as special guest star) returns to Baywatch to maintain his active lifeguard status and try to make up his lost relationship with C.J. While hanging out with Hobie at the Venice Beach Boardwalk, Joey spots Trapper (Richard Moll), a local beatnik criminal ringleader to whom Joey's mother owed money. He insists that Joey help him on a heist, or else he'll ruin her adoption. Meanwhile, Mitch sends Matt and Neely on Scarab motorboat patrol together, and they come across a group of modern day pirates who have commandeered a yacht and taken hostage Price and Jill Reynolds (Camilla More), a millionaire couple on their honeymoon. When Mitch and C.J. go looking for them, the lifeguards must defeat the pirates and rescue the couple, whom the pirates handcuffed to the submerged oil rig [from the two-part episode "Trapped Beneath the Sea"]. As Joey is being forced to steal for Trapper, Mitch comes to the rescue and threatens to have him arrested if he ever shows up again. Montage music: Original Music by Cory/John
119	10	"Sweet Dreams"	Gregory J. Bonann	Tanquil Lisa Collins	November 27, 1995	6017
After finding an abandoned baby in his tower, Logan wrongly assumes he's the father and decides to raise it. Cody participates in the trials for the Olympic swim team. Montage music: “Everything you Do” – Keely Hawkes, “Stonage” – Stone Edge
120	11	"The Incident"	Gregory J. Bonann	Kimmer Ringwald	January 15, 1996	6014
Caroline blames herself for a victim drowning after a night time rescue. Spurred on by Neely, Caroline takes a walk on the wild side. Montage music: “Throwing Fire At The Sun” – Heather Nova, “Pleasure Grounds” – Mae Moore
121	12	"Beauty and the Beast"	David W. Hagar	David Braff	January 29, 1996	6006
After swimmers are attacked by an alligator living in a storm drain, Mitch, Logan and Cody hunt for the creature. C.J., Caroline and Neely compete to become the cover model for Inside Sports magazine. Montage music: “Supermodel Sandwich” – Terence Trent D’Arby, “Adiemus” – Adiemus
122	13	"Desperate Encounter"	Douglas Schwartz	Deborah Schwartz	February 5, 1996	6018
Romance begins to spark between C.J. and Cody. Logan has been helping as a horse wrangler for an owner who is at risk of losing her ranch, with the horses going to slaughter for meat production. While honeymooning on their sailing yacht in Baja California, Damon Sinclair (Daniel Quinn) pushes his new wife Debra (Lisa Boyle) overboard in an attempted murder for her fortune. After Mitch and his new girlfriend Shelby attempt a rescue, Damon fears they suspect him of foul play and begins to chase them. Country-western singer Jesse Lee Harris (Ricky Van Shelton) is back in town for a recording session, and after hearing of the ranch predicament, puts on an impromptu benefit show to raise money for the horses and awareness of the hippophagy business. Notes: This is Daniel Quinn's third of four total appearances in the series, portraying as many different characters. Ricky Van Shelton reprises his role as Jesse Lee Harris from season 4. Montage music: “Pretty Woman”, “One Last Chance”, “Backroads” all performed by Ricky Van Shelton
123	14	"Baywatch Angels"	Georg Fenady	Michele Rogers Berk & Susan Hamilton Brin	February 12, 1996	6019
When Logan is terrorized by a mad man, Caroline dreams that the detectives from Charlie's Angels arrive at Baywatch to help him. In her dream, Caroline is Kelly Garrett, C.J. is Jill Munroe and Stephanie is Sabrina Duncan. Montage music: “Funky Junky” – Peter Andre
124	15	"Bash at the Beach"	Douglas Schwartz	Deborah Schwartz	February 19, 1996	6015
Hulk Hogan and the Baywatch team work to raise money to keep a youth recreation center open. Randy Savage and Ric Flair face off in a wrestling match for charity; Stephanie discovers that she has developed skin cancer. The title of the episode comes from WCW's Bash at the Beach 1995. The wrestling event featured Randy Savage and Ric Flair facing off in a "Lifeguard Match". Montage music: “American Made” – Hulk Hogan and Hulk’s Boot Band
125	16	"Freefall"	Michael Berk	Michael Berk	February 26, 1996	5023
Mitch is involved in a sky-surfing incident that stirs up bad memories; C.J. forms a relationship with a football player. Montage music: “Over My Shoulder” – Mike and the Mechanics, “Welcome to the Real World” – Frankie Knuckles, “I Believe” – David Hassel Hoff, “Lovin’ Me Insane” – The Rembrandts
126	17	"Sail Away"	Paul Cajero	David Braff	March 18, 1996	6011
Stephanie gets her fellow Baywatch lifeguards to participate in a sailing regatta. Mitch looks to formally adopt Joey but unforeseen complications threaten to dash his hopes.
127	18	"Lost and Found"	Reza Badiyi	Evan Somers	March 25, 1996	6010
Mitch and Caroline help to reunite a Vietnamese refugee with her American father. C.J. and Cody help a comedian who uses a wheelchair fulfill his dream of swimming in the ocean. Montage music: “Day In The Sun” – Peter Frampton, “Lets Get Together” – The Youngbloods, “Can’t Wait For You” – Kindred Spirit
128	19	"Forbidden Paradise, Part 1"	Douglas Schwartz	Deborah Schwartz	April 22, 1996	5024
Mitch, Stephanie, Matt, C.J., Logan, and Caroline travel to Hawaii to train with the Hawaiian lifeguards. Note: This two-part episode was originally released in 1995 as the direct-to-video film Baywatch the Movie: Forbidden Paradise Montage music: “Couple of Days Off” - Huey Lewis and the News, “Cruisin on Hawaiian Time” – Dave Jenkins and Kabpono, “Funky Jam” – Primal Scream, “Bone Down” – T-Ride
129	20	"Forbidden Paradise, Part 2"	Douglas Schwartz	Deborah Schwartz	April 29, 1996	5025
While in Hawaii, Mitch and Matt are saved by islanders; Stephanie finds love and Logan proposes to Caroline. Montage music: (See Forbidden Paradise, Part 1)
130	21	"Last Wave"	Reza Badiyi	Tanquil Lisa Collins & David Braff	May 6, 1996	6016
Kaye is reunited with her ex but disaster strikes. Stephanie seeks treatment for her skin cancer. Caroline catches Logan and Neely together. Montage music: “Tintinnabulum” - Adiemus, “Deep as You Go” – October Project, “Blue Hills” – Daryl Braithwaite, “Memorial Beach” – A-Ha
131	22	"Go for the Gold"	Peter H. Hunt	David Braff	May 13, 1996	6012
While Stephanie is training Cody in underwater search-and-rescue techniques, Cody finds a Spanish medallion. He has the medallion appraised and the shop owner offers Cody $3500 for it. But he does not accept it and is convinced that he will find more gold at the bottom of the ocean. Montage music: “Search for the Hero” – M People, “Way Down Deep” – Jennifer Warnes

=== Season 7 (1996–1997) ===
No. overall	No. in season	Title	Directed by	Written by	Original release date	Prod. code
132	1	"Shark Fever"	Gregory J. Bonann	David Braff	September 23, 1996	7004
Logan wants to become a director, and he has written a script named Shark Fever. He makes a movie about it and Caroline stars in it. In the movie, Caroline is supposed to be attacked by a shark and the shark is driven by Newmie. But the shark will not work. Logan gets disappointed and asks a captain on a boat if he can sedate a shark. Montage music: “Chains” – Tina Arena, “Nice Doin’ Business” – Louise Hoffsten
133	2	"The Contest"	Reza Badiyi	Michael Berk	September 30, 1996	7011
Mitch judges a beachside beauty contest, but is tempted by two of the contestants, who both vie for his vote. Caroline's acting teacher puts her relationship with Logan in jeopardy. Cody designs a new rescue vehicle. Montage music: “Sun” – Babble, “I Just Wanna Be Your Underwear” Bryan Adams, “PCH” – ZZ Top
134	3	"Liquid Assets"	Reza Badiyi	Michael Berk	October 7, 1996	7001
C.J. befriends a homeless man, who then dies and leaves her a fortune in his will. Hobie helps aspiring lifeguard Manny make the Junior Lifeguard. Montage music: “Venice Grooves” – Jim Jacobson, “Runaway” – The Cors
135	4	"Windswept"	Georg Fenady	David Braff	October 14, 1996	7010
Mitch is the prize in a bachelor auction, but things go awry when he and his date end up stranded on a deserted island. Cody competes with his roller hockey team to win a championship. Montage music: “The Life” – Mark Tschanz
136	5	"Scorcher"	Gregory J. Bonann	Kimmer Ringwald	October 21, 1996	7012
A heatwave precedes a visit to the beach by the President of the United States, as Mitch encounters a bumbling Secret Service agent. Cody faces an audit by the IRS. Caroline thinks no one has remembered her birthday. “In the Summertime” – Shaggy, “Soul” – Sovory
137	6	"Beach Blast"	Douglas Schwartz	Story by : Deborah Schwartz; Teleplay by : Kimmer Ringwald	October 28, 1996	7019
Mitch and the Baywatch gang compete against Jenny McCarthy and the MTV VJs in a charity games to raise money for the Special Olympics. Meanwhile, Mitch finds himself being admired from afar by Idalis, who has a cryptic secret about herself she wants him to uncover. Montage music: “Cat on the Loose” - Catonda Loose, “House Is Rockin’” – The Brian Setzer Orchestra
138	7	"Guess Who's Coming to Dinner"	Douglas Schwartz	Deborah Schwartz	November 4, 1996	7021
C.J.'s mother pays her a visit while on the run from criminals.
139	8	"Let the Games Begin"	Gregory J. Bonann	Tanquil Lisa Collins	November 11, 1996	7013
The International Ironman Competition is held at Baywatch and Neely sets off a battle of the sexes when she decides to enter the competition. Montage music: “The Celts” – Enya, “You’re the Voice” – David Foster, “Happy” – Mark Tschantz
140	9	"Buried"	David W. Hagar	David Braff	November 18, 1996	7006
An earthquake causes Mitch and other lifeguards to be trapped in tunnel that collapses during the lifeguard training session; Donna's past of posing in Playboy might affect her future with Baywatch. Montage music: “She’s a River” – Simple minds, “Ready to Go” – Republica
141	10	"Search and Rescue"	Gregory J. Bonann	Michael Berk	January 13, 1997	7024
The lifeguards must save the lives of those on a pier that catches fire; a man that thinks he is a vampire causes problems for Mitch; Cody asks C.J. to paint his portrait. Montage music: “The Band Played On” – Simple Minds, “Survival” – Martin Okasili
142	11	"Heal the Bay"	Gus Trikonis	Kimmer Ringwald	January 27, 1997	7017
After Mitch falls ill from swimming over contaminated waters, Cody, Caroline and C.J. investigate the cause. Montage music: “That Girl” – Maxi Priest, “Beyond the Invisible” – Enigma
143	12	"Bachelor of the Month"	Reza Badiyi	David Braff	February 3, 1997	7002
Stephanie and Tom plan their wedding. Despite having cheated on her with Neely, Logan and Caroline agree to resolve their problems with a new beginning as just friends, without having her seeing his accent stuff, before he left Baywatch for good. Montage music: “Heaven Help My Heart” -Tina Arena, “Bringing Out the Elvis” – Louise Hoffsten, “Grooving” – The Hunting Party
144	13	"Chance of a Lifetime"	Douglas Schwartz	Deborah Schwartz	February 10, 1997	7005
Disaster strikes on Stephanie and Tom's honeymoon. But even worse, Stephanie realizes there is a kid missing. She finds Trisha in the cabin and risks her life, then the sail of the boat falls and lands on Stephanie, crushing her. She dies and they hold a funeral service for her at Baywatch and Mitch gives a speech. Montage music: “Bless a Brand New Angel” – Judithe Randall
145	14	"Talk Show"	Gregory J. Bonann	Kimmer Ringwald	February 17, 1997	7007
Mitch rescues the life of a talk show host, who then invites him to appear on her show. C.J. is convinced that a stray dog found by her and Caroline possesses the reincarnated soul of the late Stephanie. Montage music: “Dog” – Milo Z, “The Only Thing That Looks Good On You Is Me” – Bryan Adams
146	15	"Life Guardian"	Gregory J. Bonann	Tanquil Lisa Collins	February 24, 1997	7022
While rescuing some youths, Caroline receives help from a boy who mysteriously vanishes; Neely gets a surprise visit from her ex-husband. Montage music: “Greatest Gift” – Tina Arena, “Watching the World” – Maxi Priest
147	16	"Matters of the Heart"	Michael Berk	Kimmer Ringwald	March 3, 1997	7023
Manny attempts to help a young boy turn his troubled life around; Mitch and Samantha reveal their relationship. Montage music: “High Time” – Cory Lerios, “Da roof” – War
148	17	"Rendezvous"	Gus Trikonis	Kimmer Ringwald	April 7, 1997	7014
Cody has an encounter with a mermaid; two teens form a suicide pact after their parents disapprove of their relationship. Montage music: “Children” – Robert Miles, “Cool Water” – Joy Askew
149	18	"Hot Water"	L. Lewis Stout	Michele Rogers Berk & Susan Hamilton Brin	April 14, 1997	7008
Sam, Neely and Caroline investigate a military jet containing a virus that crashes into the ocean; C.J., Cody and Newmie try to shut down a nude beach.
150	19	"Trial By Fire"	L. Lewis Stout	David Braff	April 21, 1997	7015
Caroline is sued by the mother of a victim of a failed rescue. C.J.'s desire for motherhood hits a snag when she realizes Cody's not ready for that type of commitment. Montage music: “Miracle” – Heidi Berry
151	20	"Baywatch at Sea World"	Douglas Schwartz	Story by : Deborah Schwartz; Teleplay by : Deborah Schwartz and Kevin Beggs	April 28, 1997	7016
The gang travels to Sea World in San Diego for the opening of the Baywatch stunt show. Montage music: “18 ‘til I Dies” – Bryan Adams, “The Giving Sea” – Crusoe
152	21	"Golden Girls"	Gus Trikonis	David Braff	May 5, 1997	7020
Neely tries to help a depressed bodyboarder named Jamie Duncan; Newmie meets a beautiful woman who does not speak English (Layla Harvest Roberts). Montage music: “Keep Up” – Christine Anu, “I Wanna Know” – Michael English
153	22	"Nevermore"	Douglas Schwartz	Deborah Schwartz	May 12, 1997	7018
C.J. finds out she has a secret admirer. Montage music: “Mine” – The Hoodoo Gurus

=== Season 8 (1997–1998) ===
No. overall	No. in season	Title	Directed by	Written by	Original release date	Prod. code
154	1	"Rookie Summer"	Gregory J. Bonann	David Braff	September 22, 1997	8001
It's a new year on the beach as Lifeguard hopefuls try out to join the Baywatch squad. Lani is haunted by a man from her past who does not want her to start a new life without him. Montage music: “Leave Your Hat On” – Alex Fox
155	2	"Next Generation"	Gregory J. Bonann	David Braff	September 29, 1997	8015
Lifeguard Rookies compete to join the Baywatch team, while Mitch makes a choice about accepting the job of Captain. Montage music: “Desire” – Toad the Wet Sprocket, “Good Vibrations”- The Beach Boys
156	3	"The Choice"	Gregory J. Bonann	Gillian Horvath	October 6, 1997	8002
Veteran lifeguard Jack 'J.D.' Darius shows up to try for the open Lieutenant position, but memories of a failed rescue still haunt him. Montage music: “Satisfied” – Bus Stop, “Proud Man” – Jon Stevens
157	4	"Memorial Day"	Gregory J. Bonann	Kimmer Ringwald	October 13, 1997	8003
Two old codgers try to give their old Navy buddy a 'proper' burial at sea. Romance blossoms between Cody and Lani. Montage music: “Freedom” – Michael English, “Cellophane Girl” – Louis Says, “Believer” – Chantal Kreviazuk
158	5	"Charlie"	Gregory J. Bonann	Tanquil Lisa Collins	October 20, 1997	8005
April's brother Charlie and her mother Paige are living with her in her small apartment. It's very hard for April to see Charlie so sick and that everyone is being nice to him out of pity. Everyone has been told that Charlie has a rare form of cancer and that he is getting treatment for it at UCLA. Later April tells Mitch that Charlie is not being treated there, they just use him for research. Charlie dies, and Baywatch, the Los Angeles County Fire Department, and United States Coast Guard, hold a memorial service for him. Montage music: “Peace and Love” – The Blessed Union of Souls, “Sarangi” – Hooverphonic, “Make a Difference” – Michael Cuccione
159	6	"Lifeguard Confidential"	David W. Hagar	Michael Berk	October 27, 1997	8004
Caroline Holden returns to Baywatch and sparks fly between her and her new boyfriend, J.D. while sleaze-ball reporter "Riptide" Roger Pelton (Shadoe Stevens) plagues the lifeguards with insider scoops. The tables are soon turned when his cameraman falls in the shark-infested ocean and his copter sinks. Montage music: “Right On” – Pianoboy, “Something Between You and I” – Say-So
160	7	"Out of the Blue"	Parker Stevenson	David Braff	November 3, 1997	8007
Caroline is torn when she must make a choice between J.D. and her dream of being an actress. Jordan meets her birth mother. Montage music: “Searching” – Cyndi Lauper, “Ouch” – Camus
161	8	"Eel Nino"	Douglas Schwartz	Gillian Horvath	November 10, 1997	8008
The Santa Ana winds blow an air of mystery into Baywatch, as well as a deadly creature that is disturbing the ocean calm. April's love life is reeling as she has to choose between Manny and Hobie.
162	9	"Homecoming"	Paul Cajero	Kimmer Ringwald	November 17, 1997	8009
Neely returns from a skiing accident hooked on painkillers. Craig Pomeroy returns to Baywatch to defend an old Native American trying to die on his tribe's land, now the public beach. Montage music: “Gitch Manido” and “Ly Oley Ale Loya” – Sacred Spirits
163	10	"Missing"	Parker Stevenson	David Braff	November 24, 1997	8021
Cody breaks regulations and leaves his tower five minutes early. In those few precious minutes a teenage girl disappears in the surf. A full scale search and rescue mission is instigated. Montage music: Original music by Cory/John
164	11	"Hijacked"	Robert Weaver	Gillian Horvath	December 1, 1997	8011
Caroline is hijacked by a young thief and forced on a wild chase across the beach. Mitch confronts Neely about her addiction to painkillers -- and learns a shocking secret. Montage music: “Getting Scared” – Imogen Heap, “Footsteps” – Annika
165	12	"No Way Out"	Gregory J. Bonann	Tanquil Lisa Collins	January 26, 1998	8019
While diving, April and Craig are pulled through a power plant intake pipe and into a chamber and must fight for their lives to avoid getting sucked into the deadly turbines. Montage music: “Burn” – Tina Arena, original music Cory/John
166	13	"Countdown"	Rick Jacobson	Tanquil Lisa Collins	February 2, 1998	8016
Cody is left to die in a sunken boat after he and Mitch track down and are captured by smugglers. Montage music: “MmmBop” – Hanson, “The Reddest Rose” – Annika
167	14	"Surf City"	Gregory J. Bonann	David Braff	February 9, 1998	8024
When Manny breaks up with April, romance heats up between her and Craig. Montage music: “Show Me Heaven” – Tina Arena, “Tears Laughter” – The Odds, “Shine” – Louis Says
168	15	"To the Max"	Douglas Schwartz	Deborah Schwartz	February 16, 1998	8006
When Cody and J.D. try to make extra money collecting sea urchins, disaster strikes and Lani loses her hearing during the rescue. After engineering a meeting with a beautiful woman, Mitch has the wildest first date of his life. Montage music: “To the Max” – Robin and Judithe Randall
169	16	"Night of the Dolphin"	Tracy Lynch Britton	Kimmer Ringwald	February 23, 1998	8014
Mitch helps old buddy Garner Ellerbee track down drug smugglers. Montage music: “Meil” – Imogen Heap
170	17	"Full Throttle"	L. Lewis Stout	Kimmer Ringwald	March 2, 1998	8010
Cody makes a wild bet with some local hotshots. Montage music: “Summertime” – The Sundays, “Friends” – Wannadies
171	18	"Quarantine"	Douglas Schwartz	Kim Weiskopf	April 20, 1998	8018
Comedian Jeff Altman guest stars as an annoying medical supplies salesman who drives the lifeguards crazy while they are quarantined at headquarters (except for Michael) - a quarantine that is interfering with everybody's plans. Montage music: “Part Time” – Gloria Estefan, “She Can Rock It” – Power Station, “Postcards” – Texas, “Walk the Walk” – Sylvia Powell
172	19	"Diabolique"	Parker Stevenson	Kimmer Ringwald	April 27, 1998	8022
The new nanny for Neely's baby develops a deadly obsession for Mitch. Montage music: “Falling” – Olive, “On the Blue Danube” – Johann Strauss
173	20	"Bon Voyage"	Douglas Schwartz	David Braff	May 4, 1998	8023
A beautiful jewel thief tricks Hobie into asking her to join him and the other lifeguards on a cruise to Alaska. Montage music: “Padded Bra” – Louise Hoffsten
174	21	"White Thunder at Glacier Bay: Part 1"	Douglas Schwartz	Story by : Deborah Schwartz; Teleplay by : Michael Berk	May 11, 1998	8012
On a cruise to Alaska, a brush with death intensifies the growing relationship between Mitch and Neely. Note: This two-part episode, along with the preceding Bon Voyage episode, was also released as the 1998 direct-to-video film Baywatch: White Thunder at Glacier Bay Montage music: “Wide Wide Blue” – Pianoboy, original music by Cory/John, “I Wanna Wake Up” – Annika, “These Lovin’ Eyes” – David Hasselhoff
175	22	"White Thunder at Glacier Bay: Part 2"	Douglas Schwartz	Story by : Deborah Schwartz; Teleplay by : Michael Berk	May 18, 1998	8013
On a cruise to Alaska, Mitch and Neely realize they're in love. Montage music: (See White Thunder at Glacier Bay: Part 1)

=== Season 9 (1998–1999) ===
No. overall	No. in season	Title	Directed by	Written by	Original release date	Prod. code
176	1	"Crash, Part 1"	Gregory J. Bonann	David Braff	September 21, 1998	9001
In the teaser, Mitch is approaching a tower while talking to Craig over the radio. It turns out that tower 14 has been washed very close to the shoreline. As a result of a storm, the tower's ramp has been moved from the tower. Meanwhile, a Boeing 747 jet airliner takes off as El Nino strikes. It gets struck by lightning and crashes into the ocean. Meanwhile, Mitch discovers that his marriage to Neely is invalid, and her ex-husband shows up with no knowledge of her baby or her current marriage, and Mitch realizes she lied to him all along. Montage music: “Where You Are” – Jim Jacobson, “Wasn’t It Good” – Tina Arena
177	2	"Crash, Part 2"	Gregory J. Bonann	David Braff	September 28, 1998	9004
Mitch receives a phone call at home about the plane crash. Later, Craig finds out that it's Cody and April's flight. When the lifeguards arrive to the scene, Mitch is relieved when he finds Cody alive in the water. Meanwhile in the first-class compartment, Francine starts having contractions. If that's not enough for April to handle, Hans freaks out and is convinced that he is going to die. Later, Neely and Mitch separate after her lies were revealed in the previous episode, and she goes back to her conniving and devious ways. Montage music: (See Crash, Part 1)
178	3	"Sharks, Lies and Videotape"	Parker Stevenson	Maggie Marshall	October 5, 1998	9005
Mitch and Cody witness a disaster involving a parasailer and a boat. While heading for the rescue, they are again beaten to the scene by Bayguard, a new firm that specializes in privatizing lifeguards. When the rescue has been completed, Mitch is introduced to Alex Ryker, CEO of Bayguard. She tells Mitch that she plans on going up against him for the county contract as Baywatch's contract is about to expire. The next day, Alex shows the Chief a videotape of some of Bayguard's amazing rescues. She also shown the Chief a tape showcasing the Baywatch team apparently slacking off. Mitch objects, but the Chief thinks Alex's proposal warrants consideration. Later, Mitch tells his lifeguards to start acting like professionals, otherwise they will not have any jobs left by the end of the week. Meanwhile, when April sees a man having a heart attack, she calls for backup and heads for the water. But Arnold, one of the Bayguards, detains her. This upsets Mitch who brings April to Bayguard for an apology from Alex. When Mitch and April arrive to Bayguard, they see Arnold paying off a stuntman. That stuntman turns out to be the parasailer who almost drowned. Mitch realizes the rescue was a fraud. After that, Cody fakes an argue with Mitch and starts working at Bayguard instead. Alex wants him as her new lieutenant. Later Cody approaches the Bayguard mobile tower truck and climbs inside. From there he talks to Mitch over his cell phone, and by using Bayguard's lap top computer, he finds out that almost all of the lifeguards at Bayguard are on short-term contracts. When the summer starts, Alex will be left alone with a couple of wannabees protecting the beach. But Arnold arrives to the truck and Cody is busted. When April tells them that a diabetic boy named Teddy is missing, Baywatch and Bayguard must work together as a team. It turns out that Teddy is trapped in a storm drain. Mitch and Alex manages to get him out. Later, Mitch learns the Chief has hired Alex to be Baywatch's new administrative consultant. Bridget (played by Marci Brickhouse) decides, after an opportunity presents itself, to stay at Baywatch rather than become a model. Montage music: “Real Woman” – Gloria Estefan, “Spice Up Your Life” – The Spice Girls
179	4	"Dolphin Quest"	Gregory J. Bonann	Tanquil Lisa Collins	October 12, 1998	9009
When Mitch and Cody have rescued a little girl, it all turns out to be just another training exercise for some kids. While doing this, they are observed by Alex's nephew Timmy, who is mildly autistic and doesn't speak. Timmy loves dolphins and his mom Valerie is taking him to Hawaii where he can visit Dolphin Quest, an organization specializing in providing young children the opportunity to swim with dolphins. When Valerie arrives to the beach and tells Alex that she can't get away from work, Mitch convinces Alex to take Timmy. Cody joins them to participate in an outrigger race. At the Dolphin Lagoon, Alex and Cody want Timmy to swim with the dolphins but he is afraid of the water. When Cody and Alex turn their back on him, he suddenly disappears. They find him with an artist named Wyland who also happens to like dolphins. Later, Cody meets Kali McKenzie, who tells him the outrigger race has been postponed due to a storm. Now Cody does not have any plans so Kali decides to give him a guided tour around the islands. When a boy falls off a cliff and ends up in a cave, Cody and Kali must work together to save him. When they return to the beach, Alex goes to help them out and forgets about Timmy for a couple of seconds. Timmy sees a girl knocked out cold by a windsurfer. He is able to bring her to shore and perform CPR before Cody and Alex arrive. Before they leave Hawaii, Timmy receives a painting from Wyland and also gets the opportunity to see a pregnant dolphin giving birth. Before Cody leaves, he says goodbye to Kali; although attracted to each other, they decide to put their feelings aside. When they return to Los Angeles again, Timmy shows the painting Wyland gave him to his mother. Timmy utters the word "Mama" to her as he touches the painting and then his mother's heart. Montage music: “Our World” – Maire Brennan, “You Can Fly” – Wade Hubbard
180	5	"The Natural"	Rick Jacobson	Sherri Ziff Lester	October 19, 1998	9010
The episode starts with someone rescuing a surfer in trouble. When the rescue has been completed, the phantom lifeguard is nowhere to be seen. A minute later, J.D. arrives in a lifeguard truck and he is able to see tracks in the sand showing clearly that someone else made the rescue. He tells Cody, Sheryl and Bridget about the incident. Later during a roll call, Mitch is surprised to find out that Alex has hired a new maintenance person, a girl named Jessie Owens. Everyone likes her at first, especially Cody and J.D.. While Cody and J.D. are on patrol, they are surprised to see Jessie jumping off a pier. They are convinced that she is trying to commit suicide. But they soon figure out that Jessie wants to become a stuntwoman. Jumping off the pier was just one of many tricks she has been working on. It turns out that Jessie is the phantom lifeguard when she rescues a little girl named Beth and then disappears mysteriously once again. It does not take very long until everyone finds out that Jessie turns out to be a bad maintenance person. Alex has no choice but to fire her. While Alex is talking to Jessie, she notices scars on her arm. Beth, the little girl Jessie rescued, had the same kind of scars. Later Jessie rescues Sean. When two of Sean's future fraternity pals bury him up to his neck, he starts sinking into a sinkhole. Mitch, Alex, J.D. and Cody assist Jessie during the rescue. When everyone has seen for themselves what a great lifeguard Jessie is, she gets the opportunity to join rookie school that is supposed to start next week. One day, Alex approaches Mitch and tells him that she wants to come out from behind her desk. Mitch knows that she is a lifeguard and a certified paramedic, but still he lets her stay at headquarters. Ed Symes returns (8.18 "Quarantine") and offers Mitch some free medical supplies if he lets him ride in the call car with him. Alex comes along and Ed bothers her all the time. When Sheryl calls them from her tower about a man with a possible heart attack, they drive to her tower. It turns out, however, the man just has cramps from a too-vigorous workout. Ed who wants to be a hero, rushes towards them with the defibrillator. Trying to save the jogger, Mitch is shocked instead. To get even with Ed, he and Alex ask him to demonstrate a sling/stretcher victim. When Ed is completely tied up and helpless, Mitch and Alex leave him on the beach. Montage music: “Girl on Fire” – INXS
181	6	"Drop Zone"	David W. Hagar	Kimmer Ringwald	October 26, 1998	9008
While Mitch and Newmie are walking down the beach, Mitch tells Newmie about a confrontation he has had with a gang. He tells Newmie that he talked them out of returning. Then suddenly Mitch's tower explodes. That is a warning from the gang. Meanwhile, April meets two tourists from Salt Lake City on the beach. They are named Sherri and Vic. Sherri wants to paint while Vic goes for a swim. When the swells are getting bad, April warns Vic but he assures her he is a good swimmer. A while later however, Vic gets swept under by the growing waves. April tries to rescue Vic but the waves are too big. When April resurfaces, Vic is nowhere to be seen. Many lifeguards arrive to the beach to search for Vic, but they are not able to find him anywhere. Mitch feels sorry for Sherri and promises her to continue the search the next morning. Mitch decides to escort Sherri to her hotel where she tells him that she is pregnant. Later at headquarters when April tries to comfort Sherri, she confronts April and blames her for Vic's death. When Vic's body finally is recovered, Sherri knows for sure he is dead. When Jessie and Alex walk by a group of convicts working on a chain gang, Jessie keeps staring at one of them named Deke. When Jessie and Alex have walked away, Deke's partner Garcia fakes a stomach-ache. When the security guard approaches Garcia, Deke knocks him down and the two convicts are able to escape. Deke decides to hide himself in Jessie's tower. It turns out that Deke is her ex-boyfriend and now he wants Jessie to follow him to Mexico. She makes him believe that is what she wants as well. But it all turns out to be a trap because Jessie has alerted the Coast Guard. Deke tries to escape by climbing up a cliff followed by Newmie. When Deke almost falls down, he is rescued by a Coast Guard helicopter and returned to prison. Jessie tells Mitch and Alex about her life with Deke. They let her stay in rookie school. Montage music: “Angry Angel” – Imogen Heap
182	7	"Hot Summer Night"	Rick Jacobson	Kimmer Ringwald	November 2, 1998	9002
When Mitch and Hobie are walking down the beach after a tough day, they notice a strange smell in a tunnel. When they have entered the tunnel, Mitch immediately recognizes the smell. Some workers have accidentally damaged a gas line. One of the workers drops his cigarette into the tunnel and Mitch and Hobie have to run out before it explodes. Later in the marina, Hobie meets his friends Brad, Josie and Randy. Because they are in no condition to drive, Hobie drives Brad's dad's boat. While they are driving, Josie pulls the throttle to full speed. Hobie loses control and it is just a matter of time before the boat turns over. Hobie manages to rescue everyone with the help of Jessie and April. Josie ends up in a coma and Brad lies to Josie's father, falsely accusing Hobie of causing the accident. Hobie ends up in prison due to reckless driving. His bail is set at $300,000. Mitch pays his bail using the deed to his house along with some money contributed by April as collateral. When Hobie meets Josie's father at the hospital, he threatens to sue Hobie because of Brad's lies. The next day, Mitch has to give Hobie the bad news that he is temporarily off the lifeguard roster. Hobie leaves upset and feels like everyone has abandoned him. Mitch takes Hobie to the hospital to meet Josie who has come out of her coma. Josie tells her father the truth that she pulled the throttle. After finding out about the truth, Josie's father apologizes to Hobie. Meanwhile, Jessie is a little scared about taking tower responsibility. She is afraid she is going to lose someone just like April did (9.6 "Drop Zone"). When she is in her tower, Jessie has a terrible nightmare that she is guarding the beach and then everyone starts drowning and calling to her. Later the same day when she and April are supposed to pick up a ghost net, they are forced to make a rescue instead when a diver has been caught in the net. But Jessie is frozen with fear. After the rescue has been completed, Jessie announces that she is going to quit Baywatch. But Mitch talks her out of it and she decides to stay. Montage music: “Sweet Religion” – Imogen Heap
183	8	"Swept Away"	L. Lewis Stout	David Braff	November 9, 1998	9011
Mitch meets a young boy who is physically abused at home. Jessie and J.D. develop feelings for each other. Alex becomes a contestant on Jeopardy!, and she later meets Alex Trebek when she saves him from drowning. However, she is later disqualified from Jeopardy! for knowing somebody on the show, which is against the rules. But Alex then gives her a bunch of Jeopardy! merchandise to make up for not being on the show. Jeopardy! host Alex Trebek guest stars as himself. Montage music: “Halfway” – Gloritone
184	9	"The Swimmer"	Gregory J. Bonann	Kimmer Ringwald	November 16, 1998	9014
Jessie hires a medical supply instructor as her stunt instructor. Montage music: “This the Trip” – Sister 7, “Is This Real” – Lisa Hall, “I’m the Man” – The Philosopher Kings
185	10	"Friends Forever"	Douglas Schwartz	Deborah Schwartz	November 23, 1998	9015
Mitch takes in an orangutan, named Morton, that escapes from its abusive dwarf owner, which complicates Mitch's and Alex's plans for Baywatch's annual Special Olympics program, while Cody and Jessie deal with Morton's owner, Herbert Green. One of the Special Olympics participators, a hearing-impaired girl named Kara, takes a liking to Morton and when she tries to hide Morton from Herbert, they end up trapped in a cave with a rising tide that threatens to drown her and the orangutan. Montage music: “We Can Do Anything” – Jeanette Clinger, “I’m Always Here” – Lerios/D’Andrea, “Forever Friends” Robin and Judithe Randall
186	11	"The Edge"	Robert Weaver	Steven Barnes	December 14, 1998	9013
Cody puts his career (and life) on the line when he starts using a performance-enhancing supplement in hopes of making it to the 2000 Sydney Olympics, which soon begins affecting his life guarding job as well. Meanwhile, Newman makes a play for Alex who's oblivious to his moves, while she quarrels with Mitch over running the Baywatch lifeguard program. But when Mitch spends more time with Alex, including getting stuck in a traffic jam and ending up in a lifeguard tower to spend the night, Newman becomes jealous. Montage music: “Push It” – Garbage, “Airplane” – Imogen Heap
187	12	"The Big Blue"	Gregory J. Bonann	Tanquil Lisa Collins	January 11, 1999	9003
Mitch becomes acquainted with some old armed service friends of an Army parachutist team where he tries to reunite one sky jumper, Tracy McComb, with her estranged Naval officer father who has a terminal illness. Jessie becomes intrigued with skydiving and persuades Mitch to go along with her for a jump, which takes a turn when they are forced to rescue some people from a boat wreck off Catalina. Meanwhile, Cody helps out Mehgan Hanley-Grier, a world famous, beautiful free-diver in training for a national deep dive competition. Montage music: “Just Like You” – Babble, “How Far” – Vennesa Daou
188	13	"Come Fly With Me"	David Hasselhoff	David Braff	January 18, 1999	9016
Mitch finds himself on the wrong side of the law when he becomes reacquainted with Tanner, the abused nine-year-old boy, whom he saves from his abusive father, Blake, and lets the boy stay at his house while Alex becomes Mitch's co-conspirator in helping Tanner. Meanwhile, Jessie has a secret admirer that turns out to be a stunt pilot who is apparently leaving her expensive gifts in her lifeguard tower, much to J.D.'s indifference. Alex has her share of trouble when several swimmers show signs of food poisoning from a bad batch of hot dogs. And Mitch and Tanner bond during a ride on the windjet but it's interrupted by Blake, the abusive father, and a fight breaks out between Mitch and Blake. In the end, Blake heads off to prison and Mitch becomes Tanner's foster dad and Tanner moves in with him. Montage music: “I’ll Be the One” – Wade Hubbard
189	14	"Boys Will Be Boys"	Georg Fenady	Kimmer Ringwald	February 1, 1999	9012
Craig returns to Baywatch after spending three weeks in Washington D.C. Both Mitch and April notice a change in him. Craig seems more depressed than usual. During a rescue, Mitch rescues the woman, while Craig is stuck with a 300-pound man. Craig is almost knocked unconscious by the man, but Mitch arrives just in time to return them to safety. Mitch is concerned about Craig's health after the rescue. He tells Craig that divorces can be tough and if he needs someone to talk to, Mitch will always be there to listen. Craig just tells him that everything is fine. Mitch and April decide that he needs to talk to Craig. Therefore he plans on taking him paddle boarding. Just before they are about to go out on their boards, Craig tells Mitch that he has lymphoma. The doctors discovered it early and Craig might live for another ten years. When they have paddled out, they are caught in a fog. While they are waiting for the fog to disappear, Craig starts eating a candy bar that he had stored in a compartment of his wet suit. Of course Mitch wants some and they end up losing it in the ocean. Craig tells Mitch that he is going to break up with April. He does not want her to end up without a boyfriend when he dies. Mitch talks him out of it. Later a shark arrives and knocks Craig off his board. Craig is knocked unconscious. After Mitch has scared away the shark, he rescues Craig. When Mitch hears a seagull, they know they are close to shore. They end up at San Clemente, an island the military use for target practice. They are arrested by the military and returned home. Craig decides to give his relationship with April another chance. Meanwhile, Cody and J.D. get into a battle of egos. Both J.D. and Cody try to put up the sail on their sailboat. But both of them fail and Jessie is the one who ends up doing it. J.D. is working extra at a local Bally Total Fitness club. When Cody arrives, he starts training the girls for free. This upsets J.D. who thinks that Cody is stealing money right out of his pocket. The two of them also decides to have a churro contest. Cody is planning on entering the Oceanside pre-Olympic triathlon. J.D. tells him that he can do it too. Then Jessie decides to participate as well. Cody and J.D. keeps ruining the race for each other all the time. And in the end, when they have injured themselves, Jessie beats them at the finish line. Meanwhile, Manny has returned for his ten days on the beach. He goes to school at Stanford. Manny wants to talk to April but she avoids him all the time. She is afraid to tell Manny the truth about her and Craig. When Manny finally gets to talk to April, he tells her that he is engaged to someone else. He met her at Stanford. April is happy for him and confesses that she too is in love with someone else. They decide to remain good friends. Montage music: “Free My Soul” – Jon Stevens, “Walk Right On” – Stefan Anderson
190	15	"Baywatch Grand Prix"	Georg Fenady	David Braff	February 8, 1999	9017
Mitch gets the need for speed when Tanner's cousin Damon Lusk, a race car driver, visits for a race car competition, and who also has a meeting of the minds with Alex. But when Damon falls ill due to an allergic reaction to shellfish, he asks Mitch to take his place for a major grand prix race, where Mitch comes up against Mark Martin, an old rival from his own former race car days. Meanwhile, after the rescue of an obnoxious couple from the ocean that attracts a lot of media attention; Newman, Cody, April and the other lifeguards help to develop a new TV show about lifeguards, titled 'Beachside', which Newman's brother-in-law is going to sponsor. Montage music: “Hey Now Now” – Swirl 360, “Hooray for Hollywood” -Jim Jacobson, “New Clear Days” – Crusoe
191	16	"Baywatch Down Under, Part 1"	Gregory J. Bonann	Maurice Hurley	February 15, 1999	9021
Mitch, Alex, April, Jessie, Cody and Jake Barnes from Zuma Beach are participating in a big rescue. A car has ended up in Bologna Creek. When the driver has been returned to safety, Mitch notices that Jake is missing. Jake is trapped under a fallen tree. Montage music: “Mouth to Mouth” – Venessa Daou, “My Island Home” – Christina Anu, “The Show Goes On” – Bruce Hornsby
192	17	"Baywatch Down Under, Part 2"	Gregory J. Bonann	Maurice Hurley	February 22, 1999	9022
Terry leaves the house in the morning and leaves a note for Jake. He goes to the dock where Clare's sailboat is. He takes his dog Spencer with him and sails away. Jake finds the note and tells Allie and Jessie that he needs some clues about where Terry is hiding. Montage music: (See Baywatch Down Under, Part 1)
193	18	"Water Dance"	Douglas Schwartz	John Whelpley	March 22, 1999	9007
While out paddling on their surfboards, Mitch and Cody encounter Ariana, a beautiful violinist, on a yacht. Lena Svenson, the yacht's owner, is Ariana's guardian and has forced her to live a restricted life. The next day, Ariana performs a recital hosted by industrialist Miles Clayton. Unbeknownst to Ariana, Lena and Miles plan on smuggling a valuable etching in Ariana's violin case. After the recital, Ariana runs away and turns up in a lifeguard tower, with the etching hidden in her violin bow. First Mitch and Cody, then Ariana's two bodyguards show up. A fight and chase ensue. Montage music: “Aquamarine” – Linda Lampenius
194	19	"Double Jeopardy"	Parker Stevenson	Chad Hayes & Carey W. Hayes	April 26, 1999	9006
While on her way to her grandmother's birthday party, Alex's day gets sidetracked when she tries to save a diamond runner, named Ben, whose partners, Lisa and Jason, want to silence him for good, which leads to a standoff in an underwater cave with Alex and Ben trying to avoid the rising tide and the smugglers circling above in their motorboat. Meanwhile, Hobie and Mitch begin to get on each other's case over privacy in the house, which prompts Hobie to think about moving out. But when Hobie cannot get in with his friends, Neely Capshaw returns and makes Hobie a lucrative offer to move in with her for awhile, which makes Mitch angry knowing that Neely always has an agenda. Montage music: “Letter of Fate” – Goldie
195	20	"Wave Rage"	Parker Stevenson	Kimmer Ringwald	May 3, 1999	9018
April tries to save Manny from himself after he sustains a life-altering back injury during a rescue. April then decides to take Manny's place with Hobie in a boat race with the other lifeguards from Baywatch. Meanwhile, Neely begins a new plan of revenge against Mitch first by taunting him and then bringing assault charges against him. Then Neely meets her match when she goes after Alex who tries to intervene in the feud between Neely and Mitch. When Neely tries to drug Alex with sleeping pills, Alex is forced to take time off and she finally stands up to Neely by firing her from Baywatch, and gives her a farewell punch to the face witnessed by lifeguards and beachgoers. Montage music: “Holy Waters” – Angelique, “Ave Mari” – Ke’
196	21	"Galaxy Girls"	Douglas Schwartz	Kimmer Ringwald	May 10, 1999	9019
Newmie and Alex are spending a lot of time together riding SeaDoos, going scuba diving and stuff like that. Newmie is convinced that Alex has the hots for him and plans to make a move on her. He tells Mitch about it, but Mitch tells him that it can not be true. Montage music: “Chinese Burn” – Curve, “Lose Your Mind” – Motorbaby
197	22	"Castles in the Sand"	Parker Stevenson	David Braff	May 17, 1999	9020
Minor sub-plot: Alex one morning is doing her morning workout run on the beach where she finds a big beautiful sand castle on the beach in front of her tower; she gets curious and tries to find out who has been making these lovely sandcastles. A couple of days later she runs down to her tower to find a young boy building a sand castle outside her tower. He sees Alex and runs away; she chases him and discovers something personal about his appearance. Montage music: “Inconceivable” – Leah Andreone

=== Season 10 (1999–2000) ===
No. overall	No. in season	Title	Directed by	Written by	Original release date	Prod. code
198	1	"Aloha, Baywatch"	Gregory J. Bonann	Maurice Hurley	September 20, 1999	2101
Mitch feels that he needs to "find himself", so he travels to Hawaii to have some time off. While on the beach in Hawaii, Mitch rescues a family in trouble, but he barely makes it. He then realizes that he would have saved them all much more effectively if he knew more about the currents and these waters in general. In an effort to reinvent himself, he sets out to begin Baywatch Hawaii, an international training camp for lifeguards. He has to pick out the best of the best, and make a perfect team to start out with. Meanwhile, Jessie realizes that she has some competition for J.D. after he meets Kekoa.
199	2	"Mahalo, Hawaii"	Georg Fenady	Maurice Hurley	September 27, 1999	2119
The Baywatch team moves in and gets acquainted, and they're all introduced to the new training routine. Sean makes them jump off a huge cliff as a startup, but none of them gets scared. Later on they face some problems with the personal differences between the team members; J.D. is an organization freak while Kekoa and Jessie are already fighting. Mitch saves Hina, a former victim, from a secondary drowning. Later on, Mitch and Sean plan a team exercise that's going to put all the lifeguards' cooperative skills to the test.
200	3	"Weak Link"	Gregory J. Bonann	Donald R. Boyle	October 4, 1999	2107
The 200th episode of the series. Dawn Masterton, a specialist in the human body, joins the team, but the other members are not confident in her skills. When they start off with an exercise led by Dawn herself, she blacks out, and the other team members have to rescue her. Dawn and J.D. later discuss how they should handle their little secret, that they know each other from before, and decides to keep it secret. Dawn manages to annoy Jessie with initiating that Jessie does not have a chance against her when it comes to J.D. Mitch and Tanner join Allie on a helicopter ride, but it ends pretty soon when they notice a possible victim waving at them from shore nearby. Later on, Tanner meets a girl who wants to teach him to ride the waves on a board. He then discovers that she's really sick and wants to end her life. J.D. gets to ride the boat "America's Cup" and makes it to the team, but he turns them down. In the end, Sean wants to cut Dawn from the team, but Mitch refuses, so he gives her an underwater challenge she passes perfectly.
201	4	"Shark Island"	Georg Fenady	Donald R. Boyle	October 11, 1999	2109
Mitch and Tanner visit Shark Island and a mysterious man who lost his son there appears in front of Tanner. Meanwhile, the lifeguard team performs a big mistake when assisting the Coast Guard in a rescue, which leads to a new kind of training for the team. Allie meets Nick Montgomery, a rescue swimmer working for the Coast Guard, and finds him fairly attractive. Kekoa flirts a lot with J.D., which pisses Jessie off completely. Later, Sean tells Jessie about his attribution to nude swimming, and she decides to try it. After a while, a swimmer nearby gets in trouble, and Jessie has to save him. In the end, they return to the new training involving the Coast Guard. Jason is chosen to wear blacked-out swim goggles because Sean finds him too self-reliant. He then gets placed on a cliff without knowing where he is. By accident, Sean, who's hiding close to Jason to make sure that he's safe, gets a rock in his head and needs a Coast Guard rescue. Jason has to take off the swim goggles and help him, even though he knows that he might lose his job by doing so.
202	5	"Strike Team"	Gregory J. Bonann	Maurice Hurley	October 18, 1999	2106
Baywatch teams up with the Coast Guard to search for a group of kids in the water. They all have to search in caves all day, but they still can not find all the kids. Allie is filming the caves with a camera with an infrared sensor to see what they have. When night falls, there's still two kids missing, but after watching over the film from their camera, they see what they think is a hand in one of the caves. They then decide to go out at night looking for the last ones, but soon discover that the victims have been swept into another cave via an underwater channel.
203	6	"Sunday in Kauai"	Gregory J. Bonann	Maurice Hurley & Donald R. Boyle	October 25, 1999	2114
The Baywatch team go on a weekend getaway to the Waimea Valley. Jessie and Kekoa are still fighting for J.D., and he loves it. After a while, they decide that they should stop being childish and start sorting stuff out, which they manage to do. When going paddling, Jessie and Kekoa have to save a man trapped in a waterfall by working together. Jason and J.D. are going to check out girls, but they do not have much success. Meanwhile, Allie and Sean search for treasure, but end up in some kind of graveyard.
204	7	"Risk to Death"	Georg Fenady	Maurice Hurley & Donald R. Boyle	November 1, 1999	2121
The new training center is finally done and ready to be boarded. Jason's individuality becomes a problem as he performs a way too risky jet ski pickup, so Sean wants to dismiss him from the team. After talking to the other lifeguards, Sean decides that he'll try to teach Jason some risk management; basically the skill of preventing accidents - on the sand. Jason learns and does his job perfectly, but three guys would not listen to him, and one of them breaks his neck. Meanwhile, Dawn outstays her welcome when she joins Nick and Allie in their private helicopter ride. All of a sudden they find a boat with no crew, and later find out that a pregnant woman went into labor after falling overboard. Then Hawaii governor Ben Cayetano appears in the episode.
205	8	"Father of the Groom"	L. Lewis Stout	Donald R. Boyle	November 8, 1999	2113
Hobie is suddenly getting married and Mitch needs to stop the wedding. Meanwhile, Sean notices that Kekoa hesitates a lot like she's afraid to commit to the team, and demands that she finds out why before she gets someone killed. She thinks it's because she's so afraid of failure, something she's been afraid of for a long time. Her father wanted a son and did the usual thing when he got a daughter instead, so she's always tried to be the best athlete - and she's made it. That is until she joined Baywatch, where all the people are top trained, which leads to her decision of leaving Baywatch since she does not think she can change something that goes this deep. Before everything is settled with Kekoa deciding to leave the team, the lifeguards have to make a difficult rescue to a victim trapped in an underwater cave. Kekoa has not left the team yet, so she helps out as best as she can. When performing CPR she breaks down completely before the victim wakes up, and realizes just how much of a difference they've done this day. In the end, this means that Kekoa overcomes her fear of failure.
206	9	"The Hunt"	Georg Fenady	John Whelpley	November 15, 1999	2115
Jessie and Jason notice a shark coming way too close to shore on their watch. When they're unable to scare it away with the jet ski, they dive down to see that the shark fins have been cut straight off. Both of them find themselves emotionally affected by this, and Jessie sets out on a personal mission to stop a shark hunting boat in the area. Jason feels that he has an emotional connection to the shark, so he decides to visit one of the true Hawaiian men to figure out what he's experiencing. When Jessie tries to stop the people hunting sharks, they throw shark bait on her after ruining her jet ski. The lifeguard team comes to save Jessie and Jason proves himself as a true kama'aina - a person belonging in the Hawaiian family.
207	10	"Gold From the Deep"	Robert Weaver	Maurice Hurley & Donald R. Boyle	November 22, 1999	2104
The team becomes obsessed with money-lust for a sunken treasure. Their argument about who the unfound treasure belongs to sets Sean off; he thinks they're destroying the team. Jason convinces Sean to permit their treasure hunt by referring to it as a scuba diving exercise and succeeds. The Coast Guard rescue swimmer Nick helps Allie find the areas where they'll most likely find a ship, but warns her that it's very unlikely that they'll be able to locate anything. Sean confronts Dawn with her lack of engagement to the team, and expresses his wish for her to step out of the sideline and into the game. Later on, they are able to locate the sunken ship and dive down to it, but the search becomes dangerous when Jason causes a torpedo to shake loose at the site.
208	11	"Bent"	Robert Weaver	Maurice Hurley & Donald R. Boyle	December 6, 1999	2122
An experimental submarine and its passengers ends up in a devastating tragedy for Allie, who finds & loses love all too quickly. She finally learns to trust Nick, a rescue swimmer working at the U.S. Coast Guard; a man she's been into for two weeks. Nick takes some huge risks when trying to save the passengers in the submarine, which unfortunately leads to him getting a severe case of the bends. He never wakes up, and Allie is devastated. Mitch arranges a lifeguard memorial service for Nick. Mitch tells her "Nick wasn't a lifeguard, but he died being one."
209	12	"Path of Least Resistance"	Rick Jacobson	Maurice Hurley & Donald R. Boyle	December 13, 1999	2103
Jason experiences success during a training exercise with the lifeguards, able to find "the path of least resistance" - being underwater instead of swimming with his head over water. J.D.'s inventions pay off, as he performs a daring underwater rescue. Jessie and Allie become parents for a day after they come across a boy who has lost his mommy. Also, Dawn deals with a painful memory of a life and death choice from her past, as a lawsuit comes her way. Sean promises to fix the mess she's in, and he's able to do so pretty easy. They all get to know that J.D. and Dawn knew each other from the past, which makes the relationship between J.D. and Jessie even more complicated.
210	13	"Liquid Visions"	Gregory J. Bonann	Cal Clements, Jr.	January 17, 2000	2124
Dawn rescues a man, underwater for over 20 minutes, and tries to learn his magical secret. The doctors said his body "shunted", something Dawn knows a bit about from before. Meanwhile, Jessie, Kekoa and Allie spend a girls' night out after spending the day shopping - all because they feel that they all need to cheer up. Kekoa can not seem to find the right guy, Allie is missing Nick (who died in S10E11, "Bent"), and Jessie needs a day off. None of them would expect that it all ends up with a rescue off the side of a cruise ship while they're all in their underwear. Later on, Sean shows interest in the secret of the man who survived 20 minutes underwater, and Dawn decides to show him a special emerger technique she learned in India, giving them a weird underwater experience Sean finds quite frightening. In a rescue at the end of the episode, Dawn gets trapped underwater, and tries to make her own body shunt. After several minutes underwater, Sean is able to get her out and get her heart going again after performing CPR.
211	14	"Lines in the Sand"	Gregory J. Bonann	Maurice Hurley & Donald R. Boyle	January 31, 2000	2123
Sean and Jason encounter Jenna for the first time when Sean spills shaved ice on her chest. They then realize that Jenna's plans for the team will make life on the station more difficult. Later on, environmental activists starts a protest against the radioactivity in the air, craving attention from the public authorities. Jessie and J.D. find themselves alone on a beach they're supposed to watch for the whole day, seeing this as an opportunity to discuss their personal issues with each other. After they've finished their watch, J.D. is set to be the judge for a beauty contest - to Jessie's annoyance.
212	15	"The Hero"	Rick Jacobson	Maurice Hurley & Donald R. Boyle	February 7, 2000	2105
The rescues the team makes make them forget about their personal troubles. Sean and Kekoa begin a romantic flirtation, which leads to a confrontation between Sean and the female lifeguards. While all this is happening, Jason accidentally makes his way into a movie cast and finds that the lead actress is attractive.
213	16	"Thunder Tide"	Gregory J. Bonann	Maurice Hurley & Donald R. Boyle	February 14, 2000	2102
Jason returns to a beach where lifeguards have lost their lives, and fights the memories that haunt him. An underwater maze leaves Jessie fighting for her life.
214	17	"Breath of Life"	Rick Jacobson	Tanquil Lisa Collins	February 21, 2000	2118
Sean sends Jason to pick up a canoe from some friends of his. It turns out that Sean wanted Jason to build a canoe of koa wood, so Jason learns an ancient Hawaiian tradition from a wise old man and his granddaughter. In the beginning, his granddaughter detests Jason, but as Jason learns to respect their old traditions, the mood changes, and they begin a romantic flirtation. While all this is going on, Sean's dating Jenna, ending with a dinner. In the middle of it, Jenna starts talking Sean into giving her more rights when it comes to the training center, which makes Sean run off angry.
215	18	"Big Island Heat"	Rick Jacobson	Maurice Hurley & Donald R. Boyle	March 13, 2000	2120
Sean and Jenna, even after working together in a daring rescue, are still fighting for control of the team. Allie and Jason make a double rescue.
216	19	"Maui Xterra"	Gregory J. Bonann	Cal Clements, Jr.	April 24, 2000	2117
With Dawn's help, Jessie prepares herself mentally and physically for the competition of a lifetime.
217	20	"Baywatch O'Hana"	Rick Jacobson	Maurice Hurley & Donald R. Boyle	May 1, 2000	2116
Sean and Jenna plan a romantic getaway in Maui, but end up in a rescue that puts Jenna's life at risk.
218	21	"Last Rescue"	Gregory J. Bonann	Rick Husky	May 8, 2000	2112
Jessie exhibits a psychic bond with her grandfather, but the emotional understanding between him and Mitch saves him from ending his life.
219	22	"Killing Machine"	L. Lewis Stout	Michael Sloan	May 15, 2000	2111
Mitch faces off with an old Navy Seal vet who is planning to bomb in the name of ecoterrorism. While Mitch is diving he is supposedly killed by a bombing attack.

=== Season 11 (2000–2001) ===
No. overall	No. in season	Title	Directed by	Written by	Original release date	Prod. code
220	1	"Soul Survivor"	Frank South	Frank South	October 2, 2000	3101
A new group of recruits has arrived for training at the new Lifeguard Training Center. Jenna has returned to oversee the center, making life difficult for Sean. Adding to the problems is Sean's friend Cliff, who has troubles of his own.
221	2	"A Knife in the Heart"	Jefferson Kibbee	Frederick Rappaport	October 9, 2000	3102
Sean's relationship with J.D. begins to get more complicated as J.D. begins to feel resentful about being on the team. The two have a falling out in front of all of the lifeguards. Kekoa's ex-boyfriend has returned to win her back, and her life gets even more complicated when she's threatened with a lawsuit from the father of a teenager who endangered the lives of a married couple swimming at a beach she lifeguarded. Later on, J.D. and Sean hug it out.
222	3	"Bad Boyz"	Jefferson Kibbee	Kris Dobkin	October 16, 2000	3103
Leigh gets jealous when Sean becomes attracted to a new team sponsor.
223	4	"Dangerous Games"	Anson Williams	André Jacquemetton & Maria Jacquemetton	October 23, 2000	3104
Leigh falls for an adrenaline junkie who might put her life at risk. Meanwhile, Kekoa tries to win the respect of her father while her cousin is visiting. Things get complicated when Kekoa's father snaps at J.D. and Kekoa and then her cousin.
224	5	"Stone Cold"	Anson Williams	Frank South	October 30, 2000	3105
Jason becomes smitten with a volleyball player who has a heart disorder. Jenna takes advantage of the tension between Sean and Leigh.
225	6	"Broken Promises"	Jefferson Kibbee	Frederick Rappaport	November 6, 2000	3106
Danny reluctantly joins the rookie team when he gets into trouble with the law again. Kekoa moves out of her father's home. Two women steal Zack and Jason's truck.
226	7	"Dream Girl"	Anson Williams	Kris Dobkin	November 13, 2000	3107
Zack endangers J.D. and Kekoa during a rescue and is placed on suspension. Jenna shows up and takes possession of a Scarab and two Jet Skis. While Zack's on suspension, he meets a mysterious woman who places him on a new path. Kekoa, seeing how close J.D. came to losing his life during Zack's rescue, starts to realize she's falling in love with J.D.
227	8	"The Cage"	Rick Jacobson	André Jacquemetton & Maria Jacquemetton	November 20, 2000	3108
Sean deals with a notorious "shark tour" provider. Jason has problems with a bumbling tourist trying to impress his son. J.D. and Kekoa try to keep their relationship a secret.
228	9	"Ben"	Gregory J. Bonann	Kris Dobkin	November 27, 2000	3109
Sean sees visions of his dead son after a teenage friend dies on a surfboard outing. Jason, J.D., Leigh and Carrie are forced to have Jenna on their team in a lifeguard competition.
229	10	"Ties That Bind"	Gabrielle Beaumont	Frederick Rappaport	December 4, 2000	3110
Zack and Jason befriend a man and his daughter who are on the run from the man's ex-wife. Sean promotes Carrie to lieutenant despite Zack's attempts to catch a purse snatcher.
230	11	"Black Widow"	Gabrielle Beaumont	André Jacquemetton & Maria Jacquemetton	December 11, 2000	3111
A millionairess is vacationing in Hawaii with her husband who dies while swimming. As Sean attempts to unravel the mystery of the murder, she accuses him of molesting her on the beach and draws the ire of the new police chief.
231	12	"The Ex-Files"	David W. Hagar	Frank South	January 29, 2001	3112
During a rescue, Jenna's reckless behavior places her life in danger and that of Zack, who rescues her, in return. Zack's in danger of losing his hearing, which stirs up feelings of remorse on Jenna's part. Sean discovers that the rescue was a false alert and discovers that it was Councilman McKenna's own son who was calling in the false alerts, which put Jenna and Zack in danger in the first place. Pat Morita (The Karate Kid) makes a guest appearance as Kekoa's father.
232	13	"The Stalker"	Rick Jacobson	Kris Dobkin	February 5, 2001	3114
Carrie, one of the rookies who was made a permanent member of Baywatch Hawaii, helps rescue a pair of scuba divers. After the rescue, one of the divers becomes infatuated with Carrie and begins stalking her. Sean becomes suspicious of this stranger, and it quickly becomes apparent as he begins showing up everywhere Carrie is. After Sean, Jason and Zack save Carrie from the stalker, she realizes that she's no longer safe and that she isn't cut out to be a lifeguard. The incident has left her so shaken up she leaves Baywatch Hawaii for good.
233	14	"Father Faust"	Rick Jacobson	Frank South	February 12, 2001	3116
Kekoa's father visits her beach. During his visit, he's saved by a junior lifeguard. At the same time, another vacationer complains to Sean that his gold watch has been stolen. As these two incidents merge, Sean is served with two lawsuits and restricted from having any contact with the beaches or the lifeguards. J.D. and Kekoa announce their engagement. Kekoa's father forces her to make a tough decision regarding her lifeguarding profession as well as her relationship with J.D. Meanwhile, Zack teaches junior lifeguards and makes a connection with one of them. In the aftermath, Kekoa's father, who filed one of the lawsuits, suffers a massive stroke after Kekoa confronts him about going after the center just to break up her marriage to J.D.
234	15	"A Good Man in a Storm"	Anson Williams	Frederick Rappaport	February 19, 2001	3117
There's a hurricane coming, and the lifeguards at the Baywatch headquarters are all preparing for the worst. In the middle of this mess, Jenna sends a false rescue to Sean because she needs a ride back to HQ. This puts them both in a dangerous situation as the storm is approaching when they're far away from the other lifeguards. They accidentally crash their Scarab and find shelter in an old military bunker. A tree falls over the entrance, making it impossible for them to get out, and later on it starts to leak water into the small bunker. Sean manages to find a drain, but the water isn't draining at the same speed it's flowing in. They both realize that they're going to drown in there, and share a lot of personal experiences with each other. At HQ, Zack is all alone with his music and Jason's donuts. All of a sudden, a tourist approaches. He later finds out that she's a freelance journalist named Ivy, searching for some big news to get on television. She's so desperate that she's going to put them both in danger.
235	16	"My Father, the Hero"	Anson Williams	André Jacquemetton & Marie Jacquemetton	February 26, 2001	3118
Sean and Jenna save a man who got his head smashed against some rocks while surfing. A friend of the victim starts a romantic flirtation with Jenna. He is working with finance, and Jenna wants him to help her with some investments. In the meantime, Jason and J.D. spends some time with Derek, a childhood friend of J.D. They soon find out that he has got a lot of personal troubles, and that he is going to put J.D. in a life-threatening situation. Later on, Jenna gets drugged by her new romance. He's trying to run off with her money, and Jenna contacts Sean for backup.
236	17	"Boiling Point"	Gary Capo	Frederick Rappaport	April 9, 2001	3113
Jason, J.D., Kekoa and Zack are sent to Kauai to go on a trip with Britt, the daughter of one of Baywatch's sponsors. In the meantime, Sean and Brian make a rescue of Matt, a boy new to windsurfing. Afterwards, the brand-new computer system at HQ breaks down. Sean was supposed to show this system to the sponsor coming over that day, so he is pretty stressed out. Matt shows up later on and offers his help to fix the computers, and he's able to do so right before the sponsor shows up. In Kauai, J.D. and Kekoa are bickering about a watch J.D. got from Jessie. They decide to stand by at the lowland to sort out their problems while Jason and Zack lead Britt away. They're both arguing for Britt's attention.
237	18	"The Return of Jessie"	Jefferson Kibbee	Howard Grigsby	April 16, 2001	3115
Jessie returns to Baywatch Hawaii with news that she's entered to race in the Ironman Triathlon. Things get awkward when she discovers that J.D. and Kekoa are seeing each other, and she wants to get back together with him.
238	19	"Trapped"	Anson Williams	Kris Dobkin	April 23, 2001	3119
Sean and Leigh are held captive by the head of a local company that's using toxic chemicals to create a manmade reef. Zack accidentally breaks a friend's paddle and tries to replace it.
239	20	"Dead Reckoning"	Jefferson Kibbee	Frederick Rappaport	April 30, 2001	3120
Sean, Jason and Zack along with the rest of the team participate in a natural obstacle course. Jenna helps Leigh get out of a prickly situation.
240	21	"Makapu'u Lighthouse"	Rick Jacobson	Frank South	May 7, 2001	3121
Sean turns down a free week at the Hilton Hawaiian Village after saving a local TV celebrity, so Zack goes in his place. Zack and Jason argue about a photographer. Sean helps a friend with a boat situation.
241	22	"Rescue Me"	David W. Hagar	Frank South	May 14, 2001	3122
The final episode of the series. Leigh's getting married as Sean contemplates a job offer from Australia to train with their lifeguards. He's also still dealing with his feelings for Leigh as he tries to choose between the two. Kekoa and J.D. reevaluate their relationship and finally decide to get married in the future.

=== Reunion movie (2003) ===
Title	Directed by	Written by	Original release date	Viewers (millions)
Baywatch: Hawaiian Wedding	Douglas Schwartz	Story by : Michael Berk & Douglas Schwartz; Teleplay by : Michael Berk	February 28, 2003	5.84
Mitch Buchannon, who supposedly died in "The Killing Machine", is recovering from amnesia in Los Angeles. He returns to Hawaii to marry Allison, a woman who looks like the late Stephanie Holden, but who's actually part of a revenge plot by Mitch's old nemesis Mason Sato (from "War of Nerves").
