= Second Noah =

American television drama series

- Genre: Drama
- Created by: Pamela K. Long
- Written by: Stephen J. Brackley; Sam Egan; Naomi Janzen; Gary R. Johnson; Anne Kenney; Brenda Lilly; Pamela K. Long; Josh Talbot; Edward Tivnan
- Directed by: Paris Barclay; Arvin Brown; Donna Deitch; Victor DuBois; Michael Fash; Lorraine Senna Ferrara; Patrick Norris; Kenny Ortega; Sandy Smolan
- Starring: Daniel Hugh Kelly; Betsy Brantley; James Marsden; Gemini Barnett; Erika Page White; Jeffrey Licon; Zelda Harris; Ashley Gorrell; Jeremy Cole Torgerson; Jon Torgerson; Deirdre O'Connell
- Theme music composer: Stephen Stills
- Opening theme: Stephen Stills
- Ending theme: Christophe Beck
- Composers: Christophe Beck (as "Jean-Christophe-Beck" in pilot episode); James McVay; Ron Ramin; Ken Tamplin
- Country of origin: United States
- Original language: English
- No. of seasons: 2
- No. of episodes: 21

Production
- Executive producer: Pamela K. Long
- Production companies: Longfeather Entertainment; MT2 Services; New World Entertainment

Original release
- Network: ABC
- Release: February 5, 1996 – June 8, 1997

Second Noah is a television drama that was broadcast in the United States on ABC television from February 5, 1996, to June 8, 1997. Reruns then continued until August 10, 1997.

== Premise ==
The series stars Daniel Hugh Kelly as Noah Beckett, whose wife Jesse (Betsy Brantley) is a veterinarian at Busch Gardens in Florida. Noah is a former basketball coach who is now a writer working on a second book, to be titled The Ark, after his first effort has sold over 2,000,000 copies. Noah and Jesse have a tendency to take in both stray animals and stray children, having adopted eight. The iguana star in the series and on the cover of the book is Peepers Saccardo. After Peeper's death, he is forever immortalized by taxidermy and sits proudly in front of the owner's fireplace.

== Characters ==
Their oldest adopted child was Ricky (James Marsden). He had fathered a child, Ben (Gemini Barnett), when he was fourteen with his girlfriend Kaylie. Noah and Jesse adopted Ben. Kaylie, daughter of a wealthy family, left town during her pregnancy and did not return until after Ben's birth; Kaylie's own father is not aware that she has ever been pregnant or had a child. Ricky and Kaylie were not together for most of the series. Instead, Ricky was with Darby, played by Joey Lauren Adams.

The series pilot tells the story of how the Becketts came to adopt children #7 and 8, Roxanna and Luis. Starting with the first non-pilot episode of the show, Roxanna and Luis are played by different actors, Erika Page White and Jeffrey Licon respectively. Roxanna is not immediately accepted at her new high school; she and Ricky develop a friendship as he tries to stand up for her. Luis is a chronic liar who tells everyone that Julio Iglesias is his father.

Ranny and Danny, played by Jon and Jeremy Torgerson, are twins a little younger than Ricky and Roxanna. They have also been adopted by the Becketts for the longest. Ranny is more of a "bad boy" who searches for his birth parents while Danny is quieter and shy.

Bethany (Zelda Harris - although RuDee Sade played the role of Bethany in the pilot episode) and Hannah (Ashley Gorrell) are the same age but Hannah was adopted later. They are very close to each other; this is highlighted by the fact that Hannah rarely speaks outside of the family and Bethany must speak for her in various situations. Hannah's mother kept her locked in a closet with little human contact prior to her adoption by the Becketts and she continues to seek comfort by hiding in closets during stressful situations. Later in the series, a man is introduced whom Bethany believes to be her father, though the show remains ambiguous on the truth of that claim. It is worthwhile to note that Bethany is Black and Hannah is White and racial tensions are often explored around these characters.

In the pilot, the Becketts find a housekeeper, Shirley (Deirdre O'Connell), who becomes part of the family. Her son, JoJo (Michael McLafferty), appears in town at some point and we learn that he used to be a drug addict and that Shirley blames him for the death of her other son, Robbie (Russell Breslow). Shirley believed that Robbie got the drugs that killed him from JoJo. There is a romance between Roxanna and Shirley's son in four episodes, "The Big Hurt"; "Faith Hope and Charity"; "Slings and Arrows"; and "The Choice".

== Order of adoption ==
According to various conversations throughout episodes, the order of the children's adoption is as follows:

In episode 9, "The Big Chief", when Jesse explained to her father why she and Noah had no biological children, she mentioned how, when on a romantic getaway in New Orleans they saw "a newspaper article about two twins whose mother had abandoned them", which means that both Ranny and Danny were the first to be adopted. In episode 7, "Ghost Story", Noah and Jesse reminisce on how they adopted Bethany at "two and a half years old", when they saw her "singing for her supper on the corner of Brighten and Broadway" in Tampa. Since Ranny and Danny are only two years older than Bethany, it is clear that Bethany was adopted second.

It is vague as to when they adopted Ricky and Hannah, because there is no direct quote explaining it. We know that Ricky fathered Ben at fourteen which was some while after he, himself was adopted. As far as Hannah is concerned, we know that she was adopted at least a year or two before her appearance in the pilot, because of her close relationship with Bethany.

After Ben was born, we were told in episode 19 ("Heart Matters") that Jesse and Noah picked him up from the adoption agency in Boston right after he was born. The reason he was born in Boston is because Kaylie was sent there to boarding school. She did not return for four years, namely the episode "Heart Matters." Luis and Roxanna were the last to be adopted. Luis was first, since in the pilot, Jesse and Noah were still trying to find Roxanna.

Therefore, the adoption order is as follows:

1. Ranny (Randolph Samson)
2. Danny (Daniel Samson) (as told in episode three, "Close Encounters")
3. Bethany
4. Ricky
5. Hannah
6. Ben
7. Luis
8. Roxanna

== Animals ==
Many animals have had major roles in various episodes. In episode 2, "Hoops and Dreams", Jesse took care of a monkey named "Caesar" after his mother, "Chloe" had died. In episode 4, "Stormy Weather", an alligator came into the house through a dog door during Hurricane Betsy. There was also another alligator who almost attacked Luis when he was trying to find their pet pig, Homer. In episode 10, a grey parrot, was found and Jesse brought it home to be Ben's pet. In episode 11, "A Dog's Life", Ricky saves an abused dog (Buddy) from his owner. In episode 17, "Slings and Arrows", Jesse is concerned about two rhinos who, like herself at one point, had trouble conceiving.

== Jesse's pregnancy ==
In episode 14, it was revealed the Jessie, who was suffering from a "mysterious ailment" in the previous episode ("Fly Like a Bird"), was finally pregnant at 41 years of age. She revealed that the conception took place when both she and Noah visited New Orleans in episode 4, "Stormy Weather." This pregnancy was a major change in the series, because the basic premise for why Jesse and Noah adopted so many children was because of her infertility.

At the news of the pregnancy, several people in the house were upset. Bethany was worried that she would become an outcast because of her skin color, asking Jesse during a private moment, "It's gonna look like you, isn't it?". Ricky was upset, because he figured Noah and Jesse would begin to treat all of them differently. He knew for himself how it felt to biologically father a child, and he was certain that there would be a rift within the family when the baby was born. Ben was upset, because he was no longer going to be the youngest. He even went as far as opening all the animal pins, one of which he let out a bull, which trampled Jesse in her attempt to rescue Ben from danger. Luis was upset, because, as Ranny and Danny stated, "Luis, have you ever heard of the phrase, 'Last hired, first fired'?" Since he and Roxanna were the last to be adopted, he worried that they would get rid of them on the arrival of the baby.

Since the child's birth was never seen due to the show's cancellation, there is no definite way to know the baby's sex. Yet, in episode 14, "God's Last Laugh", Shirley reveals that she, along with the rest of the household, did the "hang the needle test, and the needle don't lie." The needle test said that the baby was going to be a girl. Earlier in the episode, Jesse had the same hunch when she came home from the hospital. She is quoted as saying, "She's gonna be ok. I know she's gonna be ok..." to which Noah replied, "She?"

In the final episode, Jesse feels the baby kick for the first time.

== Cast ==
=== Main ===
- Daniel Hugh Kelly as Noah Beckett
- Betsy Brantley as Jesse Beckett, Noah's wife
- James Marsden as Ricky Beckett, Noah & Jesse's adoptive son
- Rudee Lipscomb (pilot) & Zelda Harris as Bethany Beckett, Noah & Jesse's adoptive daughter
- Ashley Gorrell as Hannah Beckett, Noah & Jesse's adoptive daughter
- Jon Torgerson as Ranny Beckett, Noah & Jesse's adoptive son and Danny's identical twin brother
- Jeremy Torgerson as Danny Beckett, Noah & Jesse's adoptive son and Ranny's identical twin brother
- Gemini Barnett as Ben Beckett, Noah & Jesse's adoptive son
- Sean Naegeli (pilot) & Jeffrey Licon as Luis Beckett, Noah & Jesse's adoptive son
- Justina Machado (pilot) & Erika Page White as Roxanna Beckett, Noah & Jesse's adoptive daughter
- Deirdre O'Connell as Shirley Crockmeyer
- Michael McLafferty as JoJo Crockmeyer, Shirley's son (Season 2)

=== Recurring ===
- Joey Lauren Adams as Darby
- Russell Breslow as Robbie Crockmeyer, Shirley's son

== Episodes ==
=== Season 1: 1996 ===
No. overall	No. in season	Title	Directed by	Written by	Original release date
1	1	"Pilot"	Donna Deitch	Pamela K. Long	February 5, 1996
2	2	"Hoops and Dreams"	Unknown	Unknown	February 12, 1996
3	3	"Close Encounters"	Unknown	Unknown	February 19, 1996
4	4	"Stormy Weather"	Unknown	Unknown	February 26, 1996
5	5	"The Good Samaritan"	Kenny Ortega	Naomi Janzen	March 2, 1996
6	6	"Julio is My Dad"	Unknown	Unknown	March 4, 1996
7	7	"Ghost Story"	Michael Fash	Pamela K. Long	March 11, 1996
8	8	"Rendezvous"	Patrick Norris	Anne Kenney	March 18, 1996
9	9	"The Big Chief"	Paris Barclay	Edward Tivnan	April 1, 1996
10	10	"Dreamboat"	Sandy Smolan	Naomi Janzen	April 8, 1996
11	11	"A Dog's Life"	Michael Fash	Sam Egan	April 15, 1996
12	12	"King of the Road"	Paris Barclay	Brenda Lilly	April 22, 1996

=== Season 2: 1996–97 ===
No. overall	No. in season	Title	Directed by	Written by	Original release date
13	1	"Fly Like a Bird"	Sandy Smolan	Story by : Steven J. Brackley & Edward Tivnan & Sam Egan; Teleplay by : Edward Tivnan & Steven J. Brackley	September 14, 1996
14	2	"God's Last Laugh"	Andre R. Guttfreund	Hollis Rich	September 21, 1996
15	3	"The Big Hurt"	Patrick Norris	Steven J. Brackley	September 28, 1996
16	4	"Faith, Hope and Charity"	Brian Grant	Brenda Lilly & Stephen J. Brackley	October 5, 1996
17	5	"Slings and Arrows"	Arvin Brown	Lance Kinsey	October 12, 1996
18	6	"The Choice"	Alan Metzger	Gary Johnson	October 19, 1996
19	7	"Heart Matters"	Allison Liddi	Pamela K. Long & Edward Tivnan	May 25, 1997
20	8	"Desperately Seeking Mickey"	Michael Fash	Edward Tivnan	June 1, 1997
21	9	"Diving In"	Patrick Norris	Stephen J. Brackley & Hollis Rich	June 8, 1997

== Filming location ==
The series pilot episode was actually filmed in its setting of Tampa, Florida in a house near Bayshore Boulevard. The city of Tampa received a million dollars from SN′s production there. After the show was picked up for season one the location was moved to another Floridian style home on a lake on N. Boulevard in North Tampa where it remained until the series demise.

== Cancellation ==
Second Noah was cancelled in the summer of 1997 due to low ratings, though the show's development occurred before The Walt Disney Company purchased Capital Cities/ABC in the fall of 1996, just before the start of the show's second season. Disney quickly ended all ABC programming and program plots that promoted other theme parks over its own properties, Walt Disney World and Disneyland, including the Busch Gardens-set Second Noah, especially as it was developing its own Florida-based wildlife park, Disney's Animal Kingdom, opening in April 1998. The last three episodes of the series aired in the summer of 1997 were re-written and re-set instead to feature, and be set at, Walt Disney World.

== International broadcast ==
In Canada, the series was shown on CHCH, in simulcast with ABC.

== Bilbliography ==
- Tim Brooks and Earle Marsh, The Complete Directory to Prime Time Network and Cable TV Shows 1946–Present, Ninth edition (New York: Ballantine Books, 2007) ISBN 978-0-345-49773-4
