= Private Lives of Nashville Wives =

American reality television series

- Genre: Reality
- Starring: Ana Fernandez; Betty Malo; Cassie Chapman; Erika Page White; Jenny Terrell; Sarah Davidson
- Country of origin: United States
- Original language: English
- No. of seasons: 1
- No. of episodes: 8

Production
- Executive producers: Alex Baskin; Douglas Ross; Greg Stewar; Robyn Younie
- Camera setup: Multiple
- Running time: 42 minutes
- Production company: Evolution Media

Original release
- Network: TNT
- Release: February 24 – April 14, 2014

Private Lives of Nashville Wives is an American reality television series that premiered on February 24, 2014, and aired on TNT. The series revolves around the social circle of six women who reside in Nashville, Tennessee.

CAST

== Main ==
- Ana Fernandez – Fernandez is a single mother of two, and the identical twin to Betty Malo.
- Betty Malo – Malo is married to The Mavericks lead singer and songwriter, Raul Malo.
- Cassie Chapman – Chapman is married to Christian music artist Gary Chapman.
- Erika Page White – White formerly starred in soap operas and is looking to return to acting after a hiatus. She is married to Bryan White.
- Jenny Terrell – Terrell is the vice president at a leading Internet company, and is married to JT Terrell.
- Sarah Davidson – Davidson is the ex-wife of songwriter Dallas Davidson.

== Recurring ==
- Tina Brady – Brady is married to Stan Brady, a Nashville dentist.

== Episodes ==
No.	Title	Original release date	U.S. viewers (millions)
1	"Bright Lights, Big City"	February 24, 2014	0.54
2	"Fun Sponge"	March 3, 2014	0.40
3	"Behind Closed Doors"	March 10, 2014	0.92
4	"Get Out"	March 17, 2014	0.73
5	"No Sad Songs"	March 24, 2014	0.64
6	"To Tell the Truth"	March 31, 2014	0.64
7	"Long Ride Home"	April 7, 2014	0.72
8	"Bless and Release"	April 14, 2014	0.91
