= Erika Page White =

American actress (born 1975)

- Born: Erika Page; September 17; Dallas, Texas, U.S.
- Occupation: Actress
- Years active: 1994–present
- Spouse: Bryan White (2000-present)
- Children: 2

Erika Page White (born September 17) is an American actress, known for her role as Roseanne Delgado on the ABC daytime soap opera One Life to Live from 1998 to 2001. In 2000, she received ALMA Award for Outstanding Actress in a Daytime Drama.

Page, who was adopted as an infant, was born and raised in Dallas, Texas. She made her acting debut appearing in the 1994 television film Without Consent starring Jennie Garth and Jill Eikenberry. From 1996 to 1997, she starred in the ABC drama series, Second Noah and later made her film debut appearing in Little Bigfoot (1997) and its sequel Little Bigfoot 2: The Journey Home (1998). From 2001 to 2002, she had a recurring role in the Showtime drama series Resurrection Blvd., and in 2008 played Dr. Amber Kress in the NBC soap opera Days of Our Lives. In 2014, she guest-starred in the TNT prime time soap opera Dallas, and starred in the reality series Private Lives of Nashville Wives.

== Personal life ==
Page married country music singer Bryan White in 2000. The couple have two sons, Justin and Jackson.

== Filmography ==
Year	Film	Role	Notes
1994	Without Consent	Rachel	Television film
1996–1997	Second Noah	Roxanna	Series regular, 21 episodes Nominated — Young Artist Award for Best Performance in a TV Series - Young Ensemble (1997)
1997	Little Bigfoot	Aiyana Stillwater	
1998	Little Bigfoot 2: The Journey Home	Aiyana Stillwater	
1998–2001	One Life to Live	Roseanne Delgado	Series regular ALMA Award for Outstanding Actress in a Daytime Drama (2000); Nominated — ALMA Award for Outstanding Actress in a Daytime Drama (2001); Nominated — Soap Opera Digest Award for Outstanding Female Newcomer (1999)
1999	L.A. Heat	Prof. Sandra Cutknife	Episode: "Legacy of a Buffalo Soldier"
2001	Special Unit 2	Jessie Turnbow	Episode: "The Drag"
2001–2002	Resurrection Blvd.	Vivian	Recurring role, 6 episodes
2008	Days of Our Lives	Dr. Amber Kress	Recurring role
2014	Dallas	Saphire	Episode: "Lifting the Veil"
2016	The Inspectors	Jocelyn Andrews	Episode: "Dangerous Delivery"
