= Ashley Gorrell =

American actress

- Born: Ashley Elizabeth Gorrell; January 1, 1985 (age 41); Sarasota, Florida, U.S.
- Occupation: Former actress
- Years active: 1993–2012
- Spouse: Brett Markley (as of 2019)
- Children: 2

Ashley Gorrell (born January 1, 1985) is an American former actress best known for her role as Jessica Whitaker in Thunder in Paradise. She also appeared in five episodes of Baywatch.

== Filmography ==
=== Film ===
- Thunder in Paradise II (video, 1994, as Jessica Whitaker)
- Thunder in Paradise 3 (video, 1995, as Jessica Whitaker)
- I'll Be Home for Christmas (TV movie, 1997, as Jilly Greiser)
- Mail to the Chief (TV movie, The Wonderful World of Disney S3 Ep10, 2000, as Heather Boyd)
- Bad Blood (2006, as Jess)
- Bad Blood... the Hunger (2012, as Jess)

=== Television ===
- Thunder in Paradise (1994, 18 episodes, as Jessica Whitaker)
- Baywatch (1994 - 1996, 5 episodes, as Joey Jennings)
- Second Noah (1996-1997, 21 episodes, as Hannah)
- One Tree Hill (2005, 1 episode, as Catty Girl #3)

=== Video game ===
- Thunder in Paradise Interactive (1995, as Jessica Whitaker)

== See also ==
· ·
