= List of F Troop episodes =

F Troop is a satirical American television sitcom that originally aired for two seasons on ABC. The first episode aired on September 14, 1965, and the final episode aired on April 6, 1967. There were 65 episodes in all, 34 in black and white (season 1) and 31 in color (season 2).

== Series overview ==
Season	Episodes	Originally released	
Season	Episodes	First released	Last released
1	34	September 14, 1965	May 10, 1966
2	31	September 8, 1966	April 6, 1967

== Episodes ==
=== Season 1 (1965–66) ===
All episodes in black-and-white

No. overall	No. in season	Title	Directed by	Written by	Original release date
1	1	"Scourge of the West"	Charles R. Rondeau	Story by : Jim Barnett and Ed James & Seaman Jacobs, Teleplay by : Ed James & Seaman Jacobs	September 14, 1965
Col. Malcolm (Alan Hewitt) sends clumsy Capt. Wilton Parmenter (Ken Berry) to do The General's (Barry Kelley) laundry. Because of sneezing due to an allergy, Parmenter accidentally leads a successful cavalry charge. The General awards Parmenter command of Fort Courage and F Troop. Sgt. Morgan O'Rourke (Forrest Tucker) and Cpl. Randolph Agarn (Larry Storch) tell Parmenter the troop are ready for his first inspection. The troop are a bit disheveled. Parmenter is introduced to Wrangler Jane Angelica Thrift (Melody Patterson), who runs the Trading Post in town. Parmenter learns that Lt. Jefferson Hawkes (Jay Sheffield) will be coming for an inspection. O'Rourke is worried that his partnership with the local Hekawi Indians to sell their wares to the tourists will be discovered. O'Rourke and Agarn go to see Chief Wild Eagle (Frank de Kova). Wild Eagle tells them the still is broken. To impress Lt. Hawkes, O'Rourke suggests they stage a battle. Meanwhile, the Shug Indian Chief (Henry Brandon) intends to attack the fort. Lt. Hawkes arrives. The Shugs attack and the troop think it's the Hekawis. Jane tells them it's the Shugs. The Shug Indian Chief orders a retreat when he hears that Capt. Parmenter, "The Scourge of the West", is in charge. James Hampton as Hannibal Dobbs. Edward Everett Horton as Roaring Chicken. Joe Brooks as Trooper Vanderbilt.
2	2	"Don't Look Now, One of Our Cannon Is Missing"	Charles R. Rondeau	Howard Merrill & Stan Dreben	September 21, 1965
O'Rourke asks Chief Wild Eagle to have the Hakawis make more blankets. Wild Eagle will agree only if they can borrow the fort's cannon for their Moon Festival. Agarn reluctantly goes along with it. They just have to keep Parmenter from finding out. Knowing that Wrangler Jane likes Parmenter, O'Rourke arranges a date between the two. O'Rourke and Agarn sneak the cannon out of the fort. While Wrangler and Parmenter kiss, they hear a cannon go off. The next morning, Wild Eagle refuses to give up the cannon until the clouds stop covering the moon. At the fort, Hannibal Dobbs blows Reveille. Parmenter notices the cannon missing. O'Rourke makes up a story about the cannon being out for repairs. Col. Donnely (Don "Red" Barry), from the Inspector General's office, arrives. He tells Parmenter that General Grant is on a inspection tour and will arrive tomorrow. O'Rourke wants Agarn to impersonate Grant. O'Rourke then tells Parmenter that while Agarn was getting the cannon, the Hakawis took the cannon from him. Parmenter tries to negotiate with Wild Eagle for the cannon. Agarn, as Grant, arrives. Argarn frightens Wild Eagle into giving up the cannon. Parmenter learns about O'Rourke's plan and the real Grant arrives. Don Diamond as Crazy Cat. Bob Steele as Trooper Duffy.
3	3	"The Phantom Major"	Leslie Goodwin	Arthur Julian	September 28, 1965
It is pay call at the fort. Wrangler Jane comes by with a letter for Parmenter. It's from the War Department in Washington and marked Top Secret. Meanwhile in Washington, Col. Herman Saunders (Willis Bouchey) is speaking with Col. Leslie Willoughby (John Holland), of the British Army. They will be sending Maj. Bently Royce (Bernard Fox), of the Bengal Lancers, to Fort Courage. He has new method of fighting Indians. Royce is a master of disguise and has ways of infiltrating the enemy. Royce is known as The Phantom Major. At the fort, Parmenter goes to get his rifle and finds Royce in his closet. Royce says that once he's done training F Troop, the fort will be obsolete. They will become a band of roaming fighters. Parmenter introduces Jane to Royce. Jane is quite taken with him. Agarn is worried about what will happen to O'Rourke Enterprises and the Hakawis. O'Rourke figures that once Royce sees how disorganized the troop is, that will be the end of that. His plan didn't work. Royce has the troop disguised in various ways and takes them out on a maneuver. O'Rourke and Agarn go to see Wild Eagle. They tell him about Royce and that they need to get rid of him. They find a way to make Royce's methods look bad in front of Saunders and Willoughby. Bella Bruck as Old Squaw, Wild Turkey. Gary Epper as Trooper.
4	4	"Corporal Agarn's Farewell to the Troops"	Charles R. Rondeau	Stan Dreben & Howard Merrill	October 5, 1965
Parmenter and Wrangler Jane are looking at a wanted poster. It's offering a $5000 reward for the capture of the Colton Brothers. Jane mentions how the money would be nice for a couple just getting married. Meanwhile, O'Rourke tells Doc Emmett (Forrest Lewis), the veterinarian, that his horse isn't feeling well. Agarn is also not feeling well. Parmenter takes Agarn to Doc Emmett. Agarn goes to see the Hakawis' medicine man, Roaring Chicken. Agarn overhears Doc Emmett tell O'Rourke that his horse is a goner. Agarn thinks they are talking about him. Doc Emmett tells Agarn that he will be fine, but Agarn thinks he's just being nice. Parmenter tells O'Rourke that everyone should be nice to Agarn, because it's all in his mind. Convinced that he is dying, Agarn writes a full confession about O'Rourke Enterprises to the Inspector General. Agarn tells O'Rourke about what he did. He also says that he didn't mention O'Rourke, he took the full blame. O'Rourke tells Agarn that the Doc was talking about his horse. They now have to get the letter back. Jane tells them the mail just went out. O'Rourke suggests to Agarn that they pretend to be the Colton Brothers and rob the mail. Things get confusing when the real Coltons also try to rob the mail. Parmenter arrests all four. O'Rourke does get Agarn's letter back and they find a way to cure O'Rourke's horse. Vic Tayback as Bill Colton.
5	5	"The Return of Bald Eagle"	Leslie Goodwins	Arthur Julian	October 12, 1965
Dobbs tells Parmenter he wants to turn in his bugle as he doesn't think he's a good bugler. Parmenter tells him to keep trying. Wrangler Jane comes by and tells Parmenter and Agarn that Bald Eagle (Don Rickles) was spotted at Fort Dodge. He is headed for Fort Courage. Meanwhile, O'Rourke is at the Hakawi camp supervising them making sandals. Agarn arrives and tells O'Rourke about Bald Eagle. Wild Eagle starts to panic. Bald Eagle suddenly shows up. O'Rourke and Agarn learn that he is Wild Eagle's son. Bald Eagle wants to kill them, but O'Rourke tells him they and his father are partners. Bald Eagle wants to attack Fort Courage, even if it's by himself. At the fort, Parmenter is worried that Bald Eagle could actually get the Hakawis to attack. Bald Eagle scales the fort wall, but is captured. O'Rourke wants to send Bald Eagle away. Parmenter got a directive and wants to use Operation Bury The Hatchet. Learning it's Bald Eagle's Birthday, Parmenter wants to throw him a party. At the party, Bald Eagle takes Parmenter hostage and leaves. O'Rourke, Agarn and Jane search for them. Parmenter learns that Bald Eagle is afraid of the dark. Bald Eagle is also tired of people telling him he should be more like his cousin, Geronimo. Parmenter and Bald Eagle become friends.
6	6	"Dirge for the Scourge"	Leslie Goodwins	Ed James & Seaman Jacobs	October 19, 1965
O'Rourke and Agarn think that Pete the Bartender (Benny Baker) may be taking money from the till. Pete says he's sloppy but honest. Jane is disgusted with the saloon and the riff-raff it attracts and insists that Parmenter close it down. Parmenter decides she's right. O'Rourke and Agarn can't afford to have their saloon closed. While outside the saloon, Parmenter has a couple clumsy accidents with Sam Urp (Jack Elam). Drunken Sam tells O'Rourke and Agarn that he's a gunslinger and the next time he sees Parmenter, he's going to kill him. Later, Parmenter, O'Rourke and Agarn go to the saloon. There is now a sign that says it's an ice cream parlor. They go inside and everything is neat and proper. Parmenter doesn't know it's just a front. Parmenter leaves with Jane and knocks Urp over again. O'Rourke and Agarn can't afford to lose Parmenter so they need to damage Urp's shooting hand. Turns out Urp can shoot just as well with his other hand. O'Rourke talks Wild Eagle and the Hakawis into kidnapping Urp. But some of the Braves misunderstand and kidnap Agarn instead. Back in town, Urp confronts Parmenter. Parmenter gets a clumsy shot off that winds up ensnarling Urp. Don Diamond as Brave. Harvey Parry as Charley. Rudy Bowman as Townsman. Gary Epper as Trooper. Philo McCullough as Townsman. Rod McGaughy as Townsman.
7	7	"The Girl from Philadelphia"	Charles R. Rondeau	Arthur Julian	October 26, 1965
O'Rourke, Agarn, Wild Eagle and Roaring Chicken are smoking a peace pipe. O'Rourke wants the Hakawis to start making peace pipes for the tourists. In town, Wrangler Jane gives O'Rourke the mail for Fort Courage. A woman introduces herself to O'Rourke and Agarn as Lucy Landfield (Linda Marshall), from Philadelphia. Turns out she's Parmenter's old girlfriend. She tells Parmenter that her father has friends in Washington that can get him transferred to Philadelphia. Parmenter really doesn't want to leave. He shows Lucy around town and she is not impressed. Jane comes by and her and Lucy exchange insults. O'Rourke wants Jane to make a play for Parmenter before Lucy gets her hooks in him. Lucy invites O'Rourke, Agarn and Jane to tea on Saturday. Lucy claims her and Parmenter will be announcing their engagement. O'Rourke tells Wild Eagle they may have to end their business. They come up with a plan to have Jane look more like a lady. At the Saturday tea, Parmenter is quite taken with the way Jane looks. When Lucy mentions marriage to Parmenter, Jane and Lucy start arguing. O'Rourke and Wild Eagle make it look as though Parmenter is already married to Flying Sparrow and they have a child. Later Parmenter explains to Lucy that he's not really married, he just really wants to stay at Fort Courage. Jack Tornek as Townsman.
8	8	"Old Ironpants"	Charles R. Rondeau	Arthur Julian	November 2, 1965
Wrangler Jane has a letter for Parmenter from Army Headquarters. Parmenter tells Jane and Dobbs that he's being transferred to Fort Riley. It's only temporary. He'll be taking a two week course at Command School. Parmenter wonders if he could come back a Major. O'Rourke tells Agarn that while Parmenter is gone, they can start a new money making part of O'Rourke Enterprises, mail-order brides. Jane asks Parmenter if he'll miss her. After Parmenter leaves, O'Rourke starts his Dream Bride business. Almost two weeks later, O'Rourke is expecting the brides to arrive. General Custer (John Stephenson) and Parmenter arrive instead. Custer commends Parmenter on how well he did in the course. Parmenter has turned into an iron-fisted officer. Parmenter wants to get rid of town drunk Charley and close the saloon. He takes away Dobbs' bugle. O'Rourke and Agarn go to see Wild Eagle. They would like him to stage a fake attack on the fort. O'Rourke tells Parmenter that most of the men are in sick bay. The Hakawi are circling the fort. O'Rourke, Agarn and Jane get Parmenter to be his old self. Later, the brides arrive and they are all old women. John Mitchum as Hoffenmueller. Almira Sessions as Dobbs' Bride.
9	9	"Me Heap Big Injun"	Charles R. Rondeau	Arthur Julian	November 9, 1965
Parmenter mentions to the troop that Agarn's enlistment is up next week. Parmenter brought along the reenlistment papers. O'Rourke doesn't want Agarn to sign them. He wants Agarn to be an outside man for O'Rourke Enterprises. He'll even make Agarn vice president. When O'Rourke mentions picking out dance hall girls, Agarn tears up the papers. Parmenter is surprised when he learns Agarn is leaving. Parmenter convinces Agarn to sign. Just as he starts to sign, O'Rourke comes in and stops him. O'Rourke gets Parmenter to give Agarn a weeks leave to thinks things over. O'Rourke really wants Agarn to go to the Hakawis to check on their production. Wild Eagle complains to O'Rourke that Agarn has turned Indian and he's overworking the tribe. Wild Eagle insists that O'Rourke get Agarn to reenlist. They make up a really hard list of things Agarn needs to do as an initiation. Surprisingly, Agarn does all the hard stunts. O'Rourke, Parmenter and Wrangler Jane pretend to join the Hakawis and run it like the Army. Agarn signs his reenlistment papers.
10	10	"She's Only a Build in a Girdled Cage"	Leslie Goodwins	Larry Markes & Michael Morris	November 16, 1965
Parmenter tells the men that he will be gone for a week at the Inspector General's Office. Dobbs gets a letter from his mother. Now that she has retired from being a nurse in a hospital, she will be coming for a visit. She sent along a newspaper clipping mentioning her retirement. O'Rourke finds the letter. There's a picture of Laura Lee (Patrice Wymore), a beautiful dance hall singer, on the other side of the clipping. He thinks Laura Lee is Dobbs' fiancé and she will be doing her final appearance at the fort. O'Rourke wants Agarn to go to the Hakawi camp and have them make up posters. Later, Parmenter and Col. Griswald (Bartlett Robinson) come to the fort. They see Agarn hanging a poster of Laura Lee. Griswald says he will stay until Saturday to see Laura Lee. Griswald would like to invite some other Generals. Parmenter learns from Dobbs that he's never met Laura Lee and she is not his fiancé. Parmenter doesn't know how he'll explain this to the Generals. O'Rourke tells Parmenter that he's selling tickets and they'll be having the performance at the saloon. Parmenter gets Dobbs to agree that they will pretend that Laura Lee was called to England to perform there. Meanwhile, Postmaster Abijah Mimms (Charles Seel) gives Laura Lee a special delivery letter. Parmenter and Dobbs start to tell the men the truth when the stage pulls up. Laura Lee gets out and gives Dobbs a kiss. In the stage is also Mama Dobbs (Nydia Westman). Turns out that the letter Laura Lee received was from Parmenter.
11	11	"A Gift from the Chief"	Charles R. Rondeau	Al Gordon & Hal Goldman	November 23, 1965
It's the middle of the night and Parmenter has the troop assembled. Parmenter tells them that they will be going on night maneuvers. The men are not happy and O'Rourke is not able to talk Parmenter out of it. Parmenter wants to head to the river, but O'Rourke says they are headed to the Hakawi camp. O'Rourke is worried that Parmenter will see the still he set up for the Hakawis to make liquor. They run into Wild Eagle and Roaring Chicken, who are not happy about being woken up. A boulder falls from up the mountain and almost hits Wild Eagle. Roaring Chicken claims that Parmenter saved Wild Eagle's life and must be rewarded. The next morning, Wrangler Jane tells Parmenter that the whole town is talking about him saving Wild Eagle. That night O'Rourke, Agarn and Parmenter are woken up by a baby crying. There's a note saying that the baby is for Parmenter. Parmenter says they have to give the baby back because the manual says so. O'Rourke doesn't want to insult Wild Eagle. The baby is constantly crying and they can't figure out why. Jane is able to quiet the baby down, but she thinks the baby should go back to its mother. Roaring Chicken says that Wild Eagle must save Parmenter's life and then Parmenter can give the baby back. They come up with a plan to have Wild Eagle save Parmenter from drowning in the river. Turns out Wild Eagle can't swim and the horse pulled Parmenter out. Parmenter saves Wild Eagle from another falling boulder and is given another baby. Jane finds a way to give the babies back. Mae Clarke as Woman.
12	12	"Honest Injun"	Charles R. Rondeau	Ed James & Seaman Jacobs	November 30, 1965
O'Rourke tells Agarn that he'll plant a little gold, have someone find it and start a gold rush. They'll be able to sells claims to all the people. What the two don't know is that con artist Professor Cornelius Clyde (John Dehner) and Running Bull witnessed what O'Rourke did. Clyde wants to start a gold rush of his own. O'Rourke talks Parmenter into taking some men to look for the gold. O'Rourke leads Parmenter to the spot where he planted the gold but it's not there. Back in town there is no one around. Wrangler Jane tells them that everyone bought a claim and are looking for gold north of Laramie. She says the man selling the claims is at the fort. At the fort, Clyde is selling the claims and Running Bull's Magic Elixir. O'Rourke and Agarn confront Clyde and tell him to return the money. Clyde tells them he has their gold and knows about their scheme. Clyde and Running Bull get in their stagecoach and leave. Clyde doesn't know that he dropped the gold. Agarn finds it and the men start digging in the fort. Parmenter wants O'Rourke to go after Clyde because he fleeced the men. O'Rourke tells Agarn that they will just pretend to look for Clyde. O'Rourke doesn't want Clyde to tell Parmenter about his original scheme. O'Rourke and Agarn go to the Hakawis and discover Clyde is there. Clyde has the Hakawis making the elixir instead of O'Rourke's liquor. O'Rourke finds a way for Parmenter to no longer need to go after Clyde and he gets the men's money back.
13	13	"O'Rourke vs. O'Reilly"	Leslie Goodwins	Arthur Julian	December 7, 1965
O'Rourke, Agarn and Pete the Bartender are diluting the whiskey with water. Pete mentions that O'Rourke owns the saloon. Meanwhile, beautiful Lily O'Reilly (Lee Meriwether) arrives in town. Lily tells O'Rourke that she'll be opening a saloon in town. O'Rourke will try to make sure that Parmenter doesn't give Lily a liquor license. When O'Rourke says the town doesn't need two saloons, Parmenter wonders if he should close the existing one. Agarn comes into Parmenter's office pretending to be drunk. Parmenter says he will definitely not issue another license. When Parmenter meets pretty Lily, he agrees to give her a license. O'Rourke tells Lily that a widow with 16 children owns the saloon. He'd hate to see Lily's saloon put this one out of business and leave the children to starve. Pete let's it slip that O'Rourke owns this saloon. At the Hakawi camp, Wild Eagle is overseeing the making of more whiskey. O'Rourke and Agarn tell Wild Eagle about the other saloon and ask him to not sell Lily any whiskey. Lily comes to the camp and Wild Eagle asks her how soon she wants the whiskey. Lily then says she's taking over O'Rourke's saloon. She blackmails O'Rourke with a threat to tell the Army that he owns the place. O'Rourke tries to get the town to join his temperance league and close the saloon. A massive fight starts in the saloon. Lily gives O'Rourke his saloon back and she'll go to another town. Victor Adamson as Trooper.
14	14	"The 86 Proof Spring"	Charles R. Rondeau	Fred S. Fox & Iz Elinson	December 14, 1965
O'Rourke and Agarn see a smoke signal from the Hekawis saying the still is broken. They have to hide the still at the fort to fix it. Colonel Watkins (Parley Baer) arrives and tells Parmenter that the Indians in the area have been obtaining liquor. Parmenter must find the source of the liquor and destroy it. Watkins will stay at the fort until the mission is completed. Parmenter tells O'Rourke and Agarn to search the town. O'Rourke says they have checked the town and there's nothing. Wrangler Jane tells Parmenter to check the fort. O'Rourke tries to keep Parmenter out of the NCO club, where the still is hidden. Agarn gets the still out of the club. He also dumps some of the whiskey in the well. All the men are now drinking the spiked well water. Watkins and Parmenter are drinking the water and are getting drunk. The next morning all the men are hungover. Parmenter disguises himself and wants to go to the Hekawi and ask about the liquor. Agarn goes there first to make sure Wild Eagle doesn't say anything. Parmenter sees that the Medicine Man (J. Pat O'Malley) has a tonic that makes one tell the truth. Back at the fort, Agarn drinks some of the tonic and says the still is in the NCO club. O'Rourke panics, but when he and Parmenter get to the club, there is no still. Turns out the Hekawis took the still because the Medicine Man saw Parmenter take the tonic. To get Watkins to leave, O'Rourke tricks him into thinking a natural spring was the source of the whiskey.
15	15	"Here Comes the Tribe"	Charles R. Rondeau	Ed James & Seaman Jacobs	December 21, 1965
O'Rourke and Agarn check on whiskey production at the Hekawi camp. Wild Eagle's daughter Silver Dove comes by to say hello. Some men from the Shug tribe ride in and kidnap Silver Dove. Wild Eagle says that the men from the fort should rescue her. O'Rourke and Agarn tell Parmenter what happened and would like permission to go after Silver Dove. O'Rourke, Agarn and Parmenter dress up as Indians. Some men from the fort think they are real and jump them. At the Shug camp, O'Rourke, Agarn and Parmenter see Silver Dove kissing War Cloud (MaKee K. Blaisdell). Parmenter gets into the tent where Silver dove is. Silver Dove doesn't want to go, but is taken back to the Hekawis. As a reward for rescuing his daughter, Wild Eagle tells O'Rourke that Parmenter will marry her in one week. Silver Dove is sent to the fort and Parmenter thinks she's just a housekeeper. O'Rourke and Agarn are worried that if Parmenter does marry Silver Dove, he will find out about the Hekawis making whiskey for them. They tell Wrangler Jane that Parmenter has an Indian housekeeper. Jane is not happy when she sees how pretty Silver Dove is. Parmenter is to marry Silver Dove now. O'Rourke tells Agarn to stall for time and don't let Parmenter know he's to be married. Medicine Man starts the ceremony and Parmenter learns he's the groom. O'Rourke arrives dressed as a Wedding Spirit Medicine Man and says he brings the true husband for the bride. War Cloud rides in and takes Silver Dove.
16	16	"Iron Horse Go Home"	Charles R. Rondeau	Ed James & Seaman Jacobs	December 28, 1965
O'Rourke is having the men drink up the beer is his bar during their rest period, because business has been so bad. Parmenter comes by and tells the men they need to get back to the fort and clean things up. Parmenter tells O'Rourke and Agarn that his Uncle, Colonel Jupiter Parmenter (Allyn Joslyn), is coming. Jupiter is planning the route for the trans-continental railroad. O'Rourke is thinking about all the potential customers. Jupiter arrives and inspects the troops. Jupiter says that the railroad will go by Fort Laramie. O'Rourke manipulates Parmenter into suggesting the railroad be routed through Fort Courage. To accomplish this, the U.S. Army must persuade the Hekawis to move. Wild Eagle at first refuses to move, but then Parmenter says they will buy the land for $300. The next morning the Hekawis move into Fort Courage. Jupiter says he'll be back in 48 hours and the Hekawis better be gone. O'Rourke and Agarn try to do things to annoy and tire the Hekawis, but nothing works. They then overhear Wild Eagle say that the Hekawi don't like living in the fort. Wild Eagle is waiting for O'Rourke to pay them to leave. O'Rourke and Agarn make it look as though other tribes are attacking the fort. But then the Shug tribe actually attack. Later, Wild Eagle says the Hekawis are leaving because all his women spent all their money at Wrangler Jane's store. Jupiter comes back and says the railroad will be going by Laramie. Rod McGaughy as Trooper.
17	17	"Our Hero, What's His Name?"	Charles R. Rondeau	Howard Merrill and Stan Dreban	January 4, 1966
Wrangler Jane announces mail call. Agarn gets a letter from his girlfriend Betty Lou MacDonald (Jackie Joseph, Ken Berry's real-life wife at the time). He and O'Rourke head back to the fort. Jane reminds Parmenter that they are going on a picnic. They find a nice place and suddenly a bear approaches. The bear does run away. Jane says the bear has been doing damage in the area and Parmenter says they'll need to set a trap. Agarn learns it's a "Dear John" letter from Betty Lou. O'Rourke comes up with a plan. They will write her a letter stating that hero Agarn single handedly killed Geronimo (Mike Mazurki). Betty Lou's father decides to print the news on the front page of his newspaper. The news makes it to the Secretary of War (Bill Woodson). The Secretary will go to Fort Courage to give Agarn a citation and a medal. Geronimo sees the story and decides to go see his cousin Wild Eagle and the Hekawis. Geronimo will seek revenge on Agarn by killing him. Parmenter and Jane are still trying to catch the bear. Dobbs tells Parmenter there's a rumor that the Secretary is coming to award a medal. Wild Eagle tells Geronimo that Agarn is a friend and business partner. Betty Lou arrives and tells Agarn that he's to receive the medal. The Secretary arrives and so does Geronimo. O'Rourke tells the Secretary that this was all part of Agarn's plan to capture Geronimo. Betty Lou tells Agarn she's going home to marry Clarence (Robert Sorrells). Gary Epper as Trooper. Jamie Farr as Geronimo's Friend. Philo McCullough as Townsman.
18	18	"Wrongo Starr and the Lady in Black"	Charles R. Rondeau	Stan Dreben & Howard Merrill	January 11, 1966
O'Rourke and Agarn learn from Parmenter that they will be getting a new replacement, Private Leonard W. Star (Henry Gibson). O'Rourke and Agarn know him as Wrongo Star and tell Parmenter the man is a jinx. The stage coach arrives with Wrongo. A woman dressed in black gets out of the coach. She is widower Hermione Gooderly (Sarah Marshall). She says she wants to open a knick knack shop in town. At the fort, Wrongo tells Parmenter that long ago he was riding short gun on a stage coach and Indians started attacking. He accidentally shot a Medicine Man, who then put a curse on him. Ever since he's had bad luck. Parmenter tells Wrongo to call himself Lucky Star. Later, O'Rourke and Agarn take Wrongo to see Wild Eagle. A bad thing happens to Wild Eagle. Wrangler Jane tells O'Rourke that Hermione is known as The Happy-Go-Lucky Widow. She had four service men husbands who all died mysteriously and then she collected the insurance. Agarn goes to Hermione's shop and she starts flirting with him. She gives him a glass of wine. Agarn tells O'Rourke and Parmenter that he's marrying Hermione on Friday. O'Rourke comes up with a plan to make Wrongo think he inherited a lot of money. O'Rourke tells Hermione about Wrongo's good fortune. Hermione gives Wrongo the special wine and Wrongo will marry her. Agarn comes out of his spell. Hermione learns Wrongo has no money and wants nothing to do with him. Parmenter has Wrongo transferred. Clyde Howdy as Man.
19	19	"El Diablo"	Seymour Robbie	Arthur Julian	January 18, 1966
Parmenter tells the men that the new Medical Officer, Lt. George Anderson (Hal England), is going to give them their annual physical. Anderson says that he just graduated medical school last week. Anderson is definitely inexperienced. Wrangler Jane comes by with a letter from the War Department for Parmenter. It says that the famous Mexican bandit El Diablo (Larry Storch in a dual role), was seen in the territory. Turns out that El Diablo is Agarn's look-alike cousin. Agarn asks Parmenter if he could go out to capture El Diablo single-handedly to clear the family name. Parmenter says that Agarn can go with the troop under his command. El Diablo and some of his men arrive at the Hekawi camp. After Wild Eagle says that El Diablo looks like Agarn, El Diablo wants to know where Fort Courage is. El Diablo also says he will rob the bank. O'Rourke's saloon is empty because everyone is afraid of El Diablo. At the saloon, Diablo takes Parmenter, Jane, O'Rourke and Dobbs prisoner. Diablo wants to drink up and eat up the provisions in the saloon, much to O'Rourke's dismay. Diablo gets Parmenter and Jane to dance while Felipe (Tony Martinez) plays guitar. Meanwhile, Agarn and the men are lost. Anderson comes to the saloon and suddenly El Diablo feels sick. El Diablo agrees to go to the fort dispensary. When they get to the fort, Agarn and the men are there. El Diablo and his men are then locked up.
20	20	"Go for Broke"	Seymour Robbie	Howard Merrill & Stan Dreben	January 25, 1966
Parmenter tells Agarn that the Inspector General is coming to check the troop's pension fund. Agarn says that O'Rourke is balancing the books right now. Meanwhile, O'Rourke is losing at poker to Dapper Dan Fulbright (Del Moore). Agarn tries to get more money, with no luck, from the men, Wild Eagle and then Wrangler Jane. Jane introduces Agarn to her cousin Henry Terkel (George Gobel). Henry shows Agarn an invention of his. It's a box that you talk into and a person with another box can hear you. O'Rourke tells Agarn he lost the pension fund and his saloon. Parmenter meets Henry and Henry shows him another of his inventions. Henry also shows Parmenter how he can tell what is on the other side of a playing card. Parmenter learns there's gambling at the saloon and wants it stopped. He also wants Dapper Dan out of town before the Inspector arrives. Agarn learns about Henry's talent with cards. Agarn tells Parmenter about the pension fund. He convinces Parmenter to pretend to be someone else and win the money back. Thanks to Henry's talker box, Parmenter learns that Dapper Dan has been cheating. Parmenter agrees to try and win the money back posing as Beauregard Clayton. Thanks to Henry, Parmenter wins eveything back. Gertrude Astor as Townswoman. Philo McCullough as Townsman. Charles Morton as Bartender.
21	21	"The New I.G."	Charles R. Rondeau	Arthur Julian	February 8, 1966
Wrangler Jane asks Parmenter if he remembers what the 23rd of the month is. Parmenter checks and says that's when their treaty with the Hekawis ends. Jane says it's also the six month anniversary of their meeting. Parmenter wants to take O'Rourke to see Wild Eagle. Meanwhile, Major Chester Winster (Andrew Duggan) tells General Morgan (Ed Prentiss) that Hekawis will never sign another peace treaty. Winster believes that this Saturday, when the treaty expires, there will be a full scale attack on Fort Courage. Morgan assigns Winster, as the new Inspector General, to the Fort Courage area. Winster must make F Troop a top notch fighting unit. Winster has a new rifle he designed. Wild Eagle shows O'Rourke and Agarn the toy rifle souvenirs the tribe has made. Parmenter tells O'Rourke and Agarn to set up a treaty meeting with Wild Eagle for Saturday morning. Just then Winster arrives and says that he is not impressed with the men of the troop. Winster also says they will let the treaty expire and then wipe out the Hekawis. Parmenter, Winster, O'Rourke and Agarn arrive at the Hekawi camp. Winster lists some new demands in the treaty. Winster gets upset that Wild Eagle agrees to the demands and signs the treaty. Back at the fort, Winster claims the Hekawis broke the treaty and they must attack the tribe. O'Rourke and Agarn give the troop the toy rifles. Because of the toy rifles, Winster has to surrender to the Hekawis and they sign the treaty.
22	22	"Spy, Counterspy, Counter Counterspy"	Charles R. Rondeau	Stan Dreben & Howard Merrill	February 15, 1966
Parmenter tells the men that they received a communication from the Secretary of War (Bill Woodson). They have been chosen for a secret project. Meanwhile in Washington, the Secretary is showing his assistant the bulletproof vest he wants F Troop to test. An orderly overhears this. Parmenter tells O'Rourke and Agarn another communication says that a box will arrive on the stagecoach. It's a secret weapon. Also on the stagecoach is pretty Lorelei Duval (Abbe Lane), who claims to be the new schoolmarm. Agarn lets it slip to Lorelei about the secret weapon. An old woman comes to Parmenter's office. It turns out to be the orderly who says his name is B Wise (Pat Harrington, Jr. imitating Maxwell Smart). He says he's from Counter Intelligence in Washington and is there to protect the secret weapon. Parmenter tells O'Rourke and Agarn about B Wise. Just then Lorelei arrives and asks Parmenter about teaching the men. B Wise tells Parmenter he suspects that Lorelei is a spy. Agarn is having a drink with Lorelei at the saloon. He tells her about the secret weapon and it will be tested tomorrow. Parmenter and O'Rourke come by and Lorelei gets Parmenter drunk. Parmenter learns that Lorelei took the instructions for the test from him. The next day, Parmenter gets Agarn to put on the bulletproof vest. Lorelei comes by and B Wise wants her arrested. Lorelei claims she's from Counter Intelligence and wants B Wise arrested. B Wise is the actual spy and is taken into custody. Rod McGaughy as Trooper.
23	23	"The Courtship of Wrangler Jane"	Gene Reynolds	Arthur Julian	February 22, 1966
O'Rourke and Agarn are at the Hekawi camp. O'Rourke is impressed with a steam room Wild Eagle has. He wants to build his own money making steam room in the NCO club. O'Rourke needs to get Parmenter married because married officers live off the post. He knows that Wrangler Jane has a thing for Parmenter. O'Rourke and Agarn talk to Jane and tell her they will get Parmenter to propose. They start talking up marriage to Parmenter. Jane comes by all dressed up and brings Parmenter an apple pie. Parmenter is preoccupied and winds up going on an errand. O'Rourke comes up with a plan to make Parmenter jealous by having Agarn pretend to court Jane. The next day Parmenter sees that Jane has brought Agarn breakfast. Agarn and Jane spend more time together and it is clearly bothering Parmenter. Things backfire when Parmenter tells O'Rourke he's putting in for a transfer. O'Rourke says he'd like to throw a combination farewell party for Parmenter and a bachelor party for Agarn. At the party, O'Rourke toasts Parmenter. Parmenter then wants to toast Agarn, but he sees Agarn kissing a waitress. Agarn implies to Parmenter that he's marrying Jane for the things she can give him and not for love. Jane confesses to Parmenter about O'Rourke's plan. Parmenter tears up his transfer papers and he and Jane get back together.
24	24	"Play, Gypsy, Play"	Gene Renolds	Arthur Julian	March 1, 1966
Wrangler Jane comes by the fort with a telegram from Washington for Parmenter. It says a wagon train out of Dodge reports that one of their wagons is missing. Parmenter tells O'Rourke to take some men and search for the wagon. O'Rourke tells Agarn that he'll be in charge of O'Rourke Enterprises while he's away. Meanwhile, Wild Eagle catches Crazy Cat acting like the chief. Agarn shows up to talk business. Just then a wagon pulls up with three women on it, who are singing. Agarn tells Wild Eagle they are Hungarian Gypsies. Marika (Zsa Zsa Gabor) introduces herself and her two sisters, Tanya (Jackie Loughery) and Sonya. Marika says they got separated from their wagon train and are looking for Fort Courage. Agarn sees a money making deal with the Gypsies coming to the fort. Marika agrees to a 50/50 split. Agarn brings them to the fort. They meet Parmenter and he agrees to let them stay for a couple days. After a while, Parmenter thinks the Gypsies are disrupting the normal routine. He orders Agarn to make them leave. Agarn tells Marika they have to leave and he gets his share of the money. Marika comes up with a plan. She looks at Agarn's hand and says he is their long lost prince, Egor. Agarn tells Parmenter he wants to resign and travel with the gypsies. Parmenter learns from Jane that the Gypsies have fleeced the men from three forts. Parmenter finds a way to get all of Agarn's money and now the Gypsies want nothing to do with him.
25	25	"Reunion for O'Rourke"	Charles R. Rondeau	Ed James & Seaman Jacobs	March 8, 1966
Trooper Vanderbilt announces that the Indians are attacking and the troop starts shooting. O'Rourke is upset because Parmenter denied him furlough. He has been with the cavalry for twenty five years and would like some time off. Turns out there were no Indians, they were turkeys. O'Rourke wants to go out East to find some buyers for their souvenirs. Agarn goes to talk to Parmenter. Parmenter tells Agarn that he wants to give O'Rourke a surprise testimonial dinner. Agarn should try and get a hold of some of O'Rourke's old friends. Agarn does subtly get some names from O'Rourke. Agarn hopes that Wild Eagle and the Hekawis can previde some entertainment. It's the night of the party, but Agarn tells Parmenter that he can't get O'Rourke to leave the fort. O'Rourke accidentally gets knocked out and they are able to carry him to the saloon. When he comes to, O'Rourke is thrilled to see all the people. Wild Eagle and some of the Hekawis sing an Irish song. There are some other surprises as well. O'Rourke also gets a customer for the souvenirs. Marjorie Bennett as Ella Vorhees. Eve McVeagh as Wilma McGee. Ben Gage as Mike O'Hanlon. Richard Reeves as Jim Sweeney.
26	26	"Captain Parmenter, One Man Army"	Charles R. Rondeau	Howard Merrill & Stan Dreben	March 15, 1966
Agarn tells O'Rourke that their old Captain, "Cannonball" Bill McCormick (Willard Waterman), is in town. The men have a drink with Bill at the saloon. They reminisce about some of the tricks they pulled on Bill. Bill tells them that when they reenlisted for another two years, he had already been retired. They were sworn in by a civilian and their enlistments are invalid. O'Rourke tells Agarn that they can do great things for O'Rourke Enterprises. They explain to Parmenter that they are no longer in the Army. Parmenter is now the only soldier on duty at Fort Courage. The men are celebrating at the saloon and tell the waitresses their future plans. O'Rourke and Agarn want to go into the formal suit business and tell Wild Eagle. Parmenter has Jane send a wire to Washington about what happened to the men. The Shug tribe intercept the wire and plan to attack Fort Courage. The men are going to Dodge City for the weekend. A Scout (William Edward Phipps) tells Parmenter that the Shugs are coming. Parmenter and Jane place a number of dummies that look like soldiers on the fort wall. The Shugs do retreat. Parmenter has Jane send another wire. The men all come back to reenlist, except O'Rourke and Agarn. O'Rourke and Agarn do capture the Shug Chief and decide to reenlist. Later, the Shug Chief does escape.
27	27	"Don't Ever Speak to Me Again"	Charles R. Rondeau	Arthur Julian	March 22, 1966
The Colonel (George Tyne) comes to Fort Courage for an inspection. He asks the men if they have any complaints and there are none. O'Rourke tells Parmenter that something must be going on as this was the third inspection this week. In Washington, Jenkins gives the Secretary of War the inspection reports from the Cavalry posts. The Secretary is stunned when F Troop will receive a citation for their high morale. Wrangler Jane comes to the fort with a telegram for Parmenter. He tells the troop about the citation. The Secretary will arrive in two days. O'Rourke orders Agarn to move all their souvenirs to the Hekawi camp until the Secretary leaves. O'Rourke and Agarn get into an argument. Meanwhile, Wild Eagle and Crazy Cat get into an argument. O'Rourke and Agarn bring the souvenirs to Wild Eagle and the arguing continues. The fighting and arguing spread to the other men in the fort. Even Parmenter and Jane go at it. The Secretary arrives and congratulates the troop. The Secretary leaves and the arguing continues. He returns because he forgot something and sees the fighting. The Secretary and Jenkins start arguing. Parmenter defends his men and everyone is friends again, but will it last.
28	28	"Too Many Cooks Spoil the Troop"	Gene Reynolds	Stan Burns & Mike Marmer	March 29, 1966
Major Duncan (James Gregory) is at Fort Courage and having a meal with Parmenter. Parmenter mentions the fort's cook, Private Smathers. Duncan says that as his cook was taken by Colonel Heinz, he'll be taking Smathers. O'Rourke tells Parmenter that Agarn is a great cook. Agarn is actually a bad cook, but O'Rourke has a plan. They can order excess supplies and use some in the saloon and sell some to the Indians. At the Hekawi camp Wild Eagle, Crazy Cat, O'Rourke and Agarn are listening to jokes from Standup Bull (Jamie Farr). The jokes are not very good. Wild Eagle puts in a food order. Later, Parmenter questions why Agarn needs so many supplies. That night, the men complain about the food. O'Rourke tells them that when Parmenter shows up, they should pretend to like it. It's been a week and the food is not getting any better. O'Rourke arranges for Crazy Cat to cook at the fort, but still have Parmenter think it's Agarn. Major Duncan comes by again and now wants Agarn to be his cook. With Wild Eagle's help, O'Rourke finds a way for Major Duncan to not want Agarn. Private Smathers winds up back at the fort.
29	29	"Indian Fever"	Gene Reynolds	Arthur Julian	April 5, 1966
Agarn keeps waking O'Rourke up during the night thinking he sees an Indian through the window. O'Rourke thinks he's dreaming it. Agarn sees the Indian again and wakes up the other men. The next day, Dobbs teases Agarn and Agarn bends Dobbs' bugle. Parmenter thinks that Agarn has "Indian Fever". If it persists, Agarn may have to be transferred East. Just then, Agarn sees the Indian in the window. O'Rourke suggests that Parmenter give Agarn a week's furlough. O'Rourke tells Agarn to spend some time at the Hekawi camp checking on their souvenirs. At the camp Agarn sees the Indian he keeps seeing at the fort. Crazy Cat says he's heard that an Apache scout has been roaming around. Wild Eagle says that Apache Chief Mean Buffalo (Victor Jory) may go on the warpath. O'Rourke has Wild Eagle arrange a treaty meeting with Mean Buffalo. Mean Buffalo and Beware of Dog arrive at the fort. Things go well and they agree to a treaty.
30	30	"Johnny Eagle Eye"	Seymour Robbis	Stan Dreben & Howard Merrill	April 12, 1966
Wrangler Jane brings Parmenter a telegram. There will be an Army sponsored Marksmanship contest next Saturday at Fort Bravo. F Troop is to send a representative. Parmenter will hold a shooting contest among the man to find the winner. O'Rourke and Agarn go to see Wild Eagle. Wild Eagle's sister Whispering Breeze (Cathy Lewis) and nephew Johnny Eagle Eye (Paul Petersen) are there. Whispering Breeze's husband is Sitting Bull. Johnny Eagle Eye is an expert marksman and O'Rourke would like to have him represent F Troop. O'Rourke plans to make a lot of money betting on the boy against Fort Bravo's crack shot, Sergeant Crawford (James Griffith). O'Rourke bets $1000. Whispering Breeze comes to the fort to make sure her son will be back at the camp by Saturday night. Otherwise, Sitting Bull will attack the fort. Parmenter tells O'Rourke and Agarn that the winner of the contest will be transferred to Washington to be the President's bodyguard. O'Rourke will have to loose the money and talk Johnny Eagle Eye out of being in the contest. O'Rourke tricks Johnny Eagle Eye into thinking Vanderbilt is a better shot than him. Vanderbilt wins the contest when Crawford is disqualified.
31	31	"A Fort's Best Friend Is Not a Mother"	Seymour Robbis	Ed James & Seaman Jacobs	April 19, 1966
Parmenter's mother (Jeanette Nolan) arrives at the fort. She's only staying a couple days while on her way to California. After meeting Wrangler Jane, Mrs. Parmenter decides to stay a little longer. She says that if she can make a General out of her husband, she can do the same for her son. Agarn worries about how they will sell their souvenirs with Mrs. Parmenter snooping around. O'Rourke has a plan to frighten her into leaving. While showing Mrs. Parmenter around town, a lot of wild and dangerous things happen. She tells her son and the others that she is going back to Philadelphia. O'Rourke's plan backfires, because she wants to put in a request to have Parmenter transferred back East as well. No one wants Parmenter to leave. O'Rourke convinces Mrs. Parmenter that her son is the only one that can keep the peace with the Indians. Mrs. Parmenter is proud of her son and wants him to stay at Fort Courage.
32	32	"Lieutenant O'Rourke, Front and Center"	David Alexander	Arthur Julian	April 26, 1966
Major Duncan returns to Fort Courage. He will evaulate the men to see if any should be put in an officer training course. A lot of the men come up with excuses for not participating in an obstacle course, but they are made to do it anyway. Things do not go well and Duncan calls off the test. Duncan decides that O'Rourke will be selected. O'Rourke worries that he won't be able to run O'Rourke Enterprises. Agarn hopes to get Duncan to believe that O'Rourke parties at the Hekawi camp every night and he's a disgrace to his uniform. This backfires because Duncan also likes to party. To thank O'Rourke, Duncan makes him a second lieutenant and he will be transferred. O'Rourke finds a way to have Duncan make him a sergeant again. Philo McCullough as Townsman.
33	33	"The Day the Indians Won"	David Alexander	Ed James & Seaman Jacobs	May 3, 1966
Wrangler Jane brings Parmenter a letter from Territory Headquarters. Major Duncan writes that he's worried about the Hekawis as they have been quiet too long. Parmenter sends O'Rourke and Agarn to check on the Hekawis. Meanwhile Snake Eyes tells Wild Eagle and Crazy Cat that the Hekawis need a victory or else be kicked out of the Council of Indian Nations. Wild Eagle figures they'll have to attack the Shugs. O'Rourke and Agarn know the Shugs could beat the Hekawis and there would go the souvenir business. They try to help train the Hekawis, but it doesn't go well. O'Rourke and Agarn agree to rig a fight between them and the fort. Jane hints to Parmenter about marriage. O'Rourke is able to get Parmenter out of the fort by taking some men and bringing a Hekawi treaty to Duncan. The Hekawis arrive at the fort and pretend to take the men prisoner. Snake Eyes is very impressed, but he would like Wild Eagle to burn down the fort. Parmenter and the men are returning. Snake Eyes is afraid and runs off. O'Rourke gets the Hekawis out of the fort.
34	34	"Will the Real Captain Try to Stand Up"	Charles R. Rondeau	Fred S. Fox & Iz Elinson	May 10, 1966
O'Rourke betrayed Parmenter's trust and is demoted and put in the guard house. Flashback to days earlier. Parmenter is addressing the troops when Charlie (Frank McHugh), the town drunk, comes in the fort pretending to be a soldier. Later, Charlie tells O'Rourke and Agarn that his daughter Cindy (Linda Foster) is coming from out East. Not wanting her to know he's the town drunk, he wrote her and told her he is the Captain of F Troop. As she will only be in town one day, Agarn thinks they should help Charlie, but O'Rourke is against it. Agarn gets Pete the Bartender to bet O'Rourke $100 that he can't pass Charlie off as the Captain. O'Rourke enlists Dobbs and Wrangler Jane's help in getting Parmenter drunk and passing out. O'Rourke gets Parmenter to believe he's in a Dodge City Hospital and he has "Sagebush Shakes". Cindy arrives. Parmenter realizes that he's really in the saloon in town. O'Rourke tells him the plan to help Charlie. Parmenter plays along to impress Cindy. Back to the present. Parmenter demoted O'Rourke because he really did the whole thing for the $100. Agarn tells Parmenter that O'Rourke gave the money to Cindy so she could by school books for her young students. Parmenter makes O'Rourke a Sergeant again. Charlie quits drinking.

=== Season 2 (1966–67) ===
All episodes filmed in color

No. overall	No. in season	Title	Directed by	Written by	Original release date
35	1	"The Singing Mountie"	David Alexander	Arthur Julian	September 8, 1966
Lucky Pierre Agarniere (Larry Storch in a dual role), Agarn's fur trapping Canadian cousin, arrives in town. Pierre tells Agarn and O'Rourke that he is being pursued by crooks who want to steal his furs. O'Rourke tells Pierre to hide out at the Hekawi camp. O'Rourke wants to go into the fur business. Canadian Mountie Sgt. Ramsden (Paul Lynde) arrives at Fort Courage singing. He is looking for a fur thief named Lucky Pierre. Instead of making money in the fur business, O'Rourke wonders what the reward money would be. Parmenter introduces Ramsden to the men. Ramsden at first thinks that Agarn is Pierre with his beard and mustache shaved off. Agarn is able to prove who he is. Ramsden wants Agarn confined to quarters so he doesn't contact Pierre. Parmenter is not happy when Ramsden flirts with Wrangler Jane and she leaves with him. O'Rourke goes to the Hekawi camp and Pierre tells him that Ramsden may be looking for another fur thief, the Burglar of Bamf. Parmenter finds Pierre with the Hekawis. They discover that Ramsden is really the Burglar of Bamf. The real Sgt. Ramsden shows up. Note: It is stated several times throughout the episode that Paul's character is with the Royal Canadian Mounted Police but the Royal Canadian Mounted Police was not established until 1920. Its predecessor, the North West Mounted Police (later Royal North West Mounted Police), would have been more accurate but even they were not established until 1873, when the show takes place in the 1860s.
36	2	"How to Be F Troop Without Really Trying"	David Alexander	Arthur Julian	September 15, 1966
Wrangler Jane tells Parmenter, O'Rourke and Agarn that she saw Major Bradley (George Tyne), the Inspector General, heading to the fort. Major Bradley tells them that F Troop must train new recruits, their replacements at Fort Courage. F Troop will then be transferred with the exception of Agarn. O'Rourke and Agarn want Parmenter to wire Washington to have the order rescinded, but he refuses. Lt. Mark Harrison arrives with the new recruits. Harrison flirts with Jane and now Parmenter will wire Washington. Washington turns them down. Training starts. Harrison asks Parmenter what his relationship with Jane is. O'Rourke wants to go tell Wild Eagle that Agarn will be taking over O'Rourke Enterprises. Something Agarn says gives O'Rourke an idea. He wants Wild Eagle to tell Major Bradley that Parmenter is the only one the Hekawis trust. If he and the men are shipped out, they will break their peace treaty. Major Bradley sets up a meeting with the Hekawis. Bradley tries to tell Wild Eagle that Lt. Harrison will treat the Hekawis the same way that Parmenter did. After a threat from Bradley, Wild Eagle agrees to except Harrison. F Troop leaves the fort and Bradley puts Harrison in charge of G Troop. Something happens to make Bradley change his mind and F Troop returns.
37	3	"Bye, Bye, Balloon"	Seymour Robbie	Austin & Ima Kalish	September 22, 1966
Wrangler Jane brings Parmenter a letter marked urgent. Parmenter tells O'Rourke and Agarn that Col. Heindreich von Zeppel (Harvey Korman), a Prussian balloonist, is arriving today. He will consider activating a balloon corp with F Troop as it's personal. O'Rourke figures he could borrow the balloon from time to time for O'Rourke Enterprises. Heindreich arrives with his balloon and dog, Schnitzel. Because he polished his boots with bacon grease, Schnitzel is licking Agarn's boots. Heindreich thinks the dog likes Agarn and he makes Agarn his valet. Agarn gets a little carried away with his new job. Heindreich says his real mission is to attack the Hekawis from the air. If it works, the Apaches are next. O'Rourke and Agarn tell Wild Eagle and Crazy Cat Heindreich's plan. O'Rourke would like the Hekawis to move away for a while. Wild Eagle thinks talk of a balloon is crazy. Heindreich thinks Parmenter insulted Prussia and challenges him to a duel. The two are dueling with swords. Agarn and Schnitzel fall into the balloon and the line is cut by a sword. A Hekawi arrow brings the balloon down. Parmenter and Heindreich settle their differences over a poker game. Philo McCullough as Townsman. Charles Morton as Bartender. Joe Ploski as Trooper.
38	4	"Reach for the Sky, Pardner"	Seymour Robbie	Arthur Julian	September 29, 1966
Tombstone and Pecos (George Barrows) rob F Troop's payroll train. Meanwhile, O'Rourke is adding a banquet room to the Saloon. Banker Shaun MacGuire (Charles Lane) comes riding by. He reminds O'Rourke that his note is due in 48 hours or the Saloon will be repossessed. O'Rourke tells Agarn that today is payday. When he collects all his IOU's, he'll have the money for MacGuire. Parmenter tells them the payroll was robbed. O'Rourke figures that because he and MacGuire are Irish, he can work something out with him. Outside the bank, O'Rourke and Agarn hear MacGuire tell Widow O'Brien (Mary Young) that he's foreclosing on her home as she missed a payment. O'Rourke now tries to borrow the money from Wild Eagle, with no luck. O'Rourke asks Parmenter to make an emergency request for the payroll because some hardship cases with the men. But O'Rourke can't come up with any hardships. Wrangler Jane brings a wire that says a train is leaving from Dodge City tomorrow with another payroll. O'Rourke and Agarn want to ride along on the train as mail clerks to protect the money. Parmenter sneaks onto the train in a mail sack. Tombstone and Pecos get on the train, but get captured. O'Rourke pays off MacGuire and with the reward money, he pays Widow O'Brien's debt. Song: Forrest and Larry sing "When Irish Eyes Are Smiling".
39	5	"The Great Troop Robbery"	Seymour Robbie	Stan Burns & Mike Marmer	October 6, 1966
Agarn tells O'Rourke and Parmenter that he bought his horse Thunder from a guy who does a traveling medicine show. Agarn claims the horse can do tricks, but O'Rourke and Parmenter think Agarn was taken. Agarn gets thrown from the horse and develops a slight case of amnesia. O'Rourke wants to take Agarn to the Hekawi camp because they have a new medicine man there. Wise Owl (Milton Berle) speaks with Agarn, but makes no progress. The men complain because things have been stolen from them. Parmenter wonders whether it could be Agarn. O'Rourke goes to the Hekawi camp and asks Wild Eagle if there have been any strange men around there. Wise Owl says that for a price, he will find out who the thief is. Wise Owl interrogates Agarn, Dobbs and Crazy Cat in unusual ways. Wise Owl wants to set a trap for the three suspects using Parmenter's money. The money is taken and Wise Owl thinks he saw Agarn take it. Parmenter and O'Rourke do find Duddleson's wallet in Agarn's boot. Agarn thinks he's the thief and just keeps forgetting he did it. O'Rourke figures out that Wise Owl is the thief. Agarn gets his memory back, but then is thrown from his horse and loses it again.
40	6	"The West Goes Ghost"	Seymour Robbie	Arthur Julian	October 13, 1966
O'Rourke takes Agarn, Dobbs, and Vanderbilt to a ghost town he wants them to homestead. O'Rourke says the town is called Paradise Junction. O'Rourke got a tip that the railroad will run right through there. The four will have to resign out of the Army. Wrangler Jane mentions that Paradise Junction has an actual ghost. O'Rourke doesn't believe it, but Agarn is concerned. O'Rourke and Agarn go to see Wild Eagle and would like an advance on some whiskey. Wild Eagle has heard about the ghost of Black Jack Crawford and wants nothing to do with the town. Parmenter gets a letter saying the railroad will be going through Red Wood City, not Paradise Junction. Parmenter figures the guys will reenlist when they hear the news. Jane thinks they should pretend to be ghost's to scare the four. That night the four hear a scream and then see a man riding with a bride dressed in white. O'Rourke learns that it was Harry The Hermit (Don Beddoe). Harry has been scaring people out of the town, because he wants it for himself. They then see Parmenter and Jane dressed as ghosts go riding through town. Agarn, Dobbs, Vanderbilt and Harry get scared off. O'Rourke figures out it was Parmenter and Jane. He also heard about the railroad. The men reenlist.
41	7	"Yellow Bird"	David Alexander	Stan Dreben & Howard Merrill	October 20, 1966
O'Rourke and Agarn are out searching for Apaches. They take a break and then see a beautiful blonde Indian woman. The woman makes off with their horses. They find a locket that she dropped. At the fort, they show Parmenter the locket and tell him about the woman. Inside the locket is says to my daughter Cinthia from your father Gideon D. Jeffries (Jacques Aubuchon). Parmenter thinks Cinthia was raised by the Apaches. Gideon is a silver mine owner. Parmenter thinks they should go after the Apaches. O'Rourke and Agarn will pay Wild Eagle to get the woman from his cousin Geronimo. O'Rourke figures Gideon will gladly pay him a reward for Cinthia's return. Wild Eagle does get Yellow Bird (Julie Newmar), as she's called. Yellow Bird becomes fond of Parmenter and Wrangler Jane is not happy about it. After learning about it, Yellow Bird wants to elope with Parmenter. Gideon arrives and is eager to see Cinthia. They find Parmenter and Cinthia and she remembers her father. Gideon gives O'Rourke and Agarn shares in his Silverado Mine. When he sells part of the mine, those shares will be worth $100,000. They just have to pay a transfer fee of $1000. Later, they get a wire from Gideon saying Silverado Mine is in bankruptcy due to flooding.
42	8	"The Ballot of Corporal Agarn"	Seymour Robbie	Austin & Ima Kalish	October 27, 1966
Agarn gets an absentee ballot in the mail. O'Rourke asks him who he's going to vote for, Derby Dan McGurney (Tol Avery) or George C. Bragan (Lew Parker). Agarn doesn't believe his little vote will make a difference. In Passaic, New Jersey, Mindy Dawson (Luana Patten) tells her Uncle Dan that she can't believe the vote came out a tie. Knowing who the absentee ballot belongs to, Dan drags Mindy to Fort Courage. In an effort to get his vote for Dan, Mindy starts flirting with Agarn. Wrangler Jane brings Bragan to the fort. He's there to court Agarn's vote as well. O'Rourke tells Agarn his vote should go to the highest bidder. The two men keep making Agarn offers. Bragan finally makes Agarn an offer that O'Rourke thinks he should accept. McGurney hears about it and figures he's out. But then McGurney hears about O'Rourke and Agran's dealings with the Hekawis. McGurney blackmails Agarn about O'Rourke Enterprises. Agarn gets a telegram that his vote was invalidated. Bragan says that the City Council will have to decide the winner. Later they learn that Bragan was chosen. Kid Chissell as Trooper. Philo McCullough as Townsman.
43	9	"Did Your Father Come from Ireland?"	David Alexander	Arthur Julian	November 3, 1966
O'Rourke will be going on a horse buying mission for the fort. While he's away, O'Rourke's father, Morgan O'Rourke (Forrest Tucker in a dual role), comes for a visit from Ireland. Parmenter will send some men to get O'Rourke. Instead of the hotel, Morgan wants to stay at the fort. Agarn tells Parmenter that Morgan is becoming quite a nuisance. Morgan also wants the men to paint the whole fort green. Morgan wants some of the men to form a fire brigade. Things do not go well. To get Parmenter's attention, Morgan talks Wrangler Jane into wearing dresses. Agarn takes Morgan to see the Hewakis. Agarn asks Wild Eagle to make Morgan an honorary chief so he can brag to the folks at home. Wild Eagle charges Agarn to do it. Morgan tries to start a Hekawi fire brigade and burns down most of the camp. Later, Morgan tells Agarn that the leprechauns will tell him where his son is. Agarn, Parmenter and Jane dress up as leprechauns and tell Morgan he shouldn't go looking for his son by himself. Morgan is not fooled. Just then O'Rourke shows up. Morgan tells his son what great people he's associated with.
44	10	"For Whom the Bugle Tolls"	David Alexander	Hal Goldman and Al Gordon	November 10, 1966
The men put the watch tower back up. But when Vanderbilt gets to the top, it falls down again. Wrangler Jane brings a wire stating that Col. William Bartlett (Richard X. Slattery) will be arriving for an inspection. O'Rourke knows him as "Bugle Bill" Bartlett. Bugle Bill bases his decisions about a fort on the ability of the fort's bugle player. Knowing that Trooper Dobbs is a terrible bugle player, O'Rourke and Agarn send him to Glass Mountain to practice. O'Rourke tells Parmenter about the problem they could have with Bartlett. They try to find another bugler, with no luck. Dobbs comes back to the fort and is practicing non-stop, which is driving everyone crazy. Bartlett arrives a day early and wants to hear the bugler. Officer Jenks (Tommy Farrell) arrives and tells Bartlett he needs to go check out some horses that headquarters is interested in. And then Barlett is due at Fort Mills the next day. Barlett will have to postpone inspection for a couple months. Agarn brags about their bugler. This backfires because now Barlett says he'll come back that night. Dobbs goes missing, but is found at the Hekawi camp. Crazy Cat is cleaning out the still pipes and it sounds like a great bugler. Barlett returns and Dobbs pretends to play, while it's really Crazy Cat. Barlett is very impressed.
45	11	"Miss Parmenter"	Seymour Robbie	Richard Baer	November 17, 1966
Parmenter tells O'Rourke and Agarn that the stagecoach is carrying the monthly payroll. Also on the stage is Parmenter's sister, Daphne (Patty Regan). Apparently Daphne is as clumsy as her brother. Daphne is also clearly looking for a man and Parmenter tells her to stop pushing. Daphne is attracted to Private Dobbs. Daphne bakes some cookie that turn out black. Meanwhile, Crazy Cat tries to talk Wild Eagle into buying a canoe for the tribe. O'Rourke and Agarn bring Wild Eagle the cookies and he actually likes them. Wrangler Jane joins Parmenter and Daphne for lunch. Jane learns that Daphne calls her brother Silly Willy. Daphne also mentions she's been on the road for four years looking for a husband. The Hekawis send a smoke signal saying Wild Eagle has a stomach ache and they should send help. O'Rourke believes Wild Eagle has appendicitis and will get a doctor. Parmenter says the nearest surgeon is twenty miles away. O'Rourke and Agarn find Dr. Mordecai is away on vacation. O'Rourke will do the surgery himself and it is a success. Daphne decides to give up looking for a husband and go into nursing. Daphne still wants Dobbs to write to her.
46	12	"La Dolce Courage"	David Alexander	Austin & Ima Kalish	November 24, 1966
Parmenter calls for a Surprise Indian Alert Drill to awaken the troop. Trooper Duffy tells Parmenter there's a suspicious wagon and camp outside the fort with a man speaking a foreign language. O'Rourke and Agarn go to check it out. They meet Emilio Barberini (Jay Novello) and his daughter Gina (Letícia Román). Gina says that they are running from Mario Maracucci (Joby Baker). They had to leave Sicily because Mario wanted to marry Gina. While she loves Mario, she won't marry him because he belongs to a secret society that made trouble for Emilio's restaurant. Emilio is going to San Francisco to open a restaurant there. Seeing an opportunity to make money, O'Rourke offers Emilio a spot in his saloon to sell food. What they don't know is that Mario is nearby. Wild Eagle will help make wine. O'Rourke, Agarn and Parmenter start finding warnings from the Black Foot Society that Mario belongs to. Emilio and Gina are frightened and want to leave town, but Parmenter talks them into staying. Agarn finally runs into Mario. Mario threatens to kill Agarn because he thinks Gina loves him. Gina knows Mario is there and tries to make him jealous. O'Rourke, Agarn and Parmenter find a way to get Mario and Gina together. Mario agrees to leave the Black Foot Society.
47	13	"Wilton the Kid"	Phil Rawlins	Richard Baer	December 1, 1966
O'Rourke and Agarn are going to the bank to deposit their earnings from the saloon. The Bank Teller comes running out of the bank claiming it's being robbed. O'Rourke and Agarn see the crook and think it's Parmenter. They want to talk Parmenter into turning himself in and a confusing conversation ensues. O'Rourke and Agarn go to see Wild Eagle about increasing the whiskey output. Suddenly the crook that robbed the bank shows up. The crook wants another horse. Later at the saloon, O'Rourke is starting to believe the crook has to be a double of Parmenter. The crook shows up at the saloon. Thinking it's Parmenter, Wrangler Jane confronts him. Nearsighted Sheriff Pat Lawton (Sterling Holloway) shows up. Lawton tells O'Rourke that this is Kid Vicious (Ken Berry in a dual role). Kid Vicious is able to escape the saloon and makes his way to hide in Fort Courage. The next day Agarn tells them that the horse Vicious stole from Wild Eagle made it back to the Hekawi camp. Vicious will need to steal another horse. While O'Rourke leads a search party, Vicious confronts Parmenter and switches clothes with him. Later, O'Rourke does figure out who the real Parmenter is. Thanks to Parmenter's clumsiness, Vicious is caught.
48	14	"The Return of Wrongo Starr"	Gary Nelson	Stan Dreben, Howard Merrill, & Jim Barnett	December 8, 1966
O'Rourke wants to have a goat as the fort mascot. They would get an annual allowance of $100 to feed the animal. O'Rourke says they can feed the goat with scraps from the mess hall and keep the money. Parmenter tells the troop that the fort will be receiving a shipment of a new explosive called dynamite. Wrangler Jane comes by and tells them that Pvt. Leonard "Wrongo" Starr (Henry Gibson) is escorting the dynamite. Wrongo arrives and Parmenter tries to boost his confidence. O'Rourke and Agarn go see Wild Eagle to see if he has any good luck charms. Parmenter tells the men that they will use some dynamite to blow up part of a mountain that the Apaches use to attack wagon trains. Wrongo is to guard the dynamite until Friday. Parmenter gives Wrongo a special assignment to prove he isn't a jinx. Agarn mentions that this Friday is the 13th. O'Rourke thinks the goat ate some of the dynamite. O'Rourke sees a Hekawi smoke signal saying Wild Eagle is dying. O'Rourke and Agarn get to the Hekawi camp. Wild Eagle believes that when a white goat crosses one's path, they will die. Word arrives that the Apaches are on the war path at Canyon Trail. That is where Parmenter sent Wrongo. Thanks to Wrongo and the goat, the dynamite goes off and stops the Apaches.
49	15	"Survival of the Fittest"	Gary Nelson	Arthur Julian	December 15, 1966
Captain Jonathan W. Blair (George Furth) arrives at the fort. He tells Parmenter that he will need two volunteers to undergo a 10 day survival test where they have to fend for themselves. If the men survive the test, they will get a 30 day furlough. Hearing about the furlough, O'Rourke volunteers himself and Agarn. Wrangler Jane arrives and is impressed with all of Blair's medals. To try to impress Jane, Parmenter decides to take O'Rourke's place in the test. Blair finds some food that Agarn hid in his clothes. Parmenter and Agarn are dropped off in the wilderness. Agarn starts a fire and then not thinking, he puts it out. Parmenter hears a bear and goes after it, but that doesn't go well. An Undertaker (Arthur Julian) comes to town claiming he's there for, soon to be, two dead bodies. Blair goes to meet Colonel Ferguson (I. Stanford Jolley). O'Rourke hints to Dobbs and Duffy that they go bring some food to Parmenter and Agarn. O'Rourke also asks Wild Eagle to put out food. Parmenter catches Dobbs and Duffy placing food around. Then he catches Wild Eagle and Crazy Cat. After finding some evidence, Blair asks Ferguson to place O'Rourke under arrest for disobeying orders. Blair also wants Parmenter court-martialed. Parmenter comes back with the others and Ferguson commends him because he never ate any of the food.
50	16	"Bring on the Dancing Girls"	David Alexander	Arthur Julian	December 22, 1966
O'Rourke is worried because business has been dropping off at the saloon. Parmenter still believes that Pete the Bartender owns the saloon. O'Rourke and Agarn ask Parmenter if he would allow Pete to have dancing girls to help his business. Parmenter will allow it. A Dan Larson (Peter Leeds) rides into the fort wanting to see Parmenter. Larson tells O'Rourke and Agarn that he is the new owner of the saloon. Turns out Larson is a blackmailer. He found out O'Rourke is illegally owning the place and that's how he took over the saloon. At the Hewkai camp, the tribe is bottling more whiskey. O'Rourke tells Wild Eagle that he lost the saloon. O'Rourke wants them to not sell whiskey to Larson. They learn that Larson gets his whiskey from the Apaches. Wrangler Jane doesn't like the idea of dancing girls. O'Rourke also gets Parmenter to restrict the men to the fort. The men are now mad at Agarn and O'Rourke, because they want to see the dancing girls. Parmenter allows the men to go into town. O'Rourke finds a way to have Parmenter run Larson out of town. But the dancing girls have to go as well.
51	17	"The Loco Brothers"	Hollingsworth Morse	Richard Baer	December 29, 1966
Parmenter is having the men, in teams of two, practice opening the gates as fast as they can. Vanderbilt and Duffy are the first team. As they open the gates, two Indians ride in and carry off Parmenter. O'Rourke figures they took the Captain to hold for ransom. Wrangler Jane finds out what happen to Parmenter. O'Rourke and Agarn go talk to Wild Eagle, who says it sounds like to Loco Brothers (James Daris and Med Flory). Wild Eagle says they are renegades. Meanwhile, the brothers tells Parmenter they are just looking for a friend. The troop are out searching for Parmenter. They see Parmenter try to escape out of a cave, but the brothers get him. Jane arrives and they all try to come up with a way to save Parmenter. O'Rourke suggests that Jane try to lure the brothers out. In the cave, the brothers complain about how their father never had time for them. Jane gets upset when the brothers aren't interested in her. Agarn then dresses as a woman and tries to get the brothers attention. The brothers chase Agarn around and Parmenter is rescued. The troop capture the brothers. Later, the brothers ride off with Agarn.
52	18	"From Karate with Love"	Hollingsworth Morse	Arthur Julian	January 5, 1967
Wrangler Jane will be in Dodge City for three days and O'Rourke and the troop will watch her store. The stage coach arrives and a Japanese woman named Miko Tanahara (Miko Mayama) comes into the store. Miko would like refuge in the fort as she is being chased by "honorable bad man". Parmenter reluctantly agrees to her request. Miko gives Parmenter, O'Rourke and Agarn some Japanese gifts as a thank you. O'Rourke wants to go into the Japanese souvenir business and have the Hekawis make the products. O'Rourke and Agarn show Wild Eagle and Crazy Cat the items they want them to make. After O'Rourke and Agarn leave, a Samurai Warrior (Mako) comes to the camp looking for a Japanese girl. Jane comes to the fort and O'Rourke and Agarn try to keep her from Parmenter's office. Jane gets upset when she sees Miko catering to Parmenter. Miko explains that the Samurai has come to take her back to her father. Her father arranged her to marry a man she doesn't love. The Samurai arrives at the fort and knocks down the gate. He demands Parmenter turn over Miko. O'Rourke has Jane dress up as Miko, but Samurai is not fooled. Miko is dressed as Jane and Samurai follows her to Jane's store. Samurai destroys parts of the store before he is captured by O'Rourke and Agarn. Not wanting more trouble, Miko agrees to go back to her father. Samurai wants to stay here with Miko.
53	19	"The Sergeant and the Kid"	Seymour Robbie	Arthur Julian	January 12, 1967
Parmenter, Agarn and part of F Troop are dressed as Indians to have war games with O'Rourke and the rest of the troop. Wrangler Jane doesn't know about the war games. Thinking Parmenter is a real Indian in the fort, she attacks him. After she realizes her mistake, Jane tells Parmenter that ten-year-old Joey Walker (Peter Robbins) is missing from his farm. What no one knows is that Joey is in the fort. Later, they find Joey and he says he wants to enlist in the Cavalry. Joey's mother, Molly Walker (Pippa Scott), arrives. She is not happy about her boy wanting to be a soldier. Parmenter understands as Molly is the widow of a cavalry trooper. O'Rourke tells Molly that Joey will just run away again. She should leave the boy at the fort and O'Rourke will find a way to discourage the boy. Agarn leads the troop in excercises. Joey is the only one left standing. When Wild Eagle charges too much to stage a fake attack on Molly's farmhouse, O'Rourke will have the men dress as Indians again and do it themselves. Agarn and the men show up at the farnhouse and then Wild Eagle and his men show up. Joey recognizes Agarn and O'Rourke's plan falls apart. O'Rourke manages to talk Joey into staying at home and gets a date with Molly.
54	20	"What Are You Doing After the Massacre?"	Phil Rawlins	Austin & Ima Kalish	January 19, 1967
A flaming arrow is shot into the fort with a note as a warning. A second arrow is shot. Parmenter, O'Rourke and Agarn go to see Wild Eagle. A flaming arrow is shot into the camp. Wild Eagle says that 147-year-old Hekawi chief Flaming Arrow (Phil Harris) must be coming down from the mountains. Last time Flaming Arrow came around, he started trouble with the white man. Just then Flaming Arrow arrives in camp. He claims that drinking mountain blackberry juice has given him the long life. Later, Flaming Arrow tells Wild Eagle that he wants to get land back from the white men and lead a massacre. Parmenter brings gifts to Flaming Arrow, but he isn't interested. Flaming Arrow tells him he wants all the land in the US back, starting with Fort Courage. Parmenter wants the men to get ready for a possible attack. Flaming Arrow wants to lay siege to the fort until they are too weak to fight. Because Flaming Arrow trusted George Washington, O'Rourke wants Agarn to pose as Washington and talk peace. They are able to put Flaming Arrow behinds bars and end the siege. An Old Indian Woman (Dorothea Neumann) comes looking for Flaming Arrow. Turns out she is his mother. Rod McGaughy as Indian.
55	21	"A Horse of Another Color"	Phil Rawlins	Arthur Julian	January 26, 1967
For his latest addition to O'Rourke Enterprises, O'Rourke has set up a horse wash in the Hekawi camp. On the way back to the fort, O'Rourke and Agarn see a herd of wild horses in the canyon. Everyone calls the leader of the horses "Black Devil". If they could capture the beautiful horse, O'Rourke thinks they could make a lot of money selling it to the Wild West Show that's coming to town. Meanwhile, Parmenter and Wrangler Jane are on a picnic. Jane mentions what a beautiful horse Black Devil is. With Jane's birthday coming up, Parmenter would like to get the horse for her. Dobbs tries to teach Parmenter how to rope a horse. O'Rourke asks Wild Eagle if one of the Hekawi could rope Black Devil. Wild Eagle has some "horse nip" that he has for sale. Agarn sprinkles some of the horse nip by the canyon. He and O'Rourke then go to the saloon. On the way, the rest of the horse nip is leaking out of the bag. Black Devil follows the trail to the saloon, gets the bag and leaves. Agarn thinks they could lure Black Devil with a female horse named Zelda. Agarn learns that Parmenter wants to capture Black Devil for Jane. Black Devil chases Parmenter and Agarn into a cave and keeps them there. O'Rourke and Jane both try to rope Black Devil. Black Devil and Zelda run off together.
56	22	"V Is for Vampire"	Hollingsworth Morse	Austin & Ima Kalish	February 2, 1967
Count Sforza (Vincent Price), driving a hearse, arrives in town. Parmenter tells O'Rourke and Agarn that he received a memo saying to be on the look-out for spies or suspicious characters. They then see Sforza with his crow. Sforza goes to Wrangler Jane's store, introduces himself and says he's from Transylvania. Parmenter comes into the store and Sforza introduces the crow as his brother. Sforza says he has rented the Worthington mansion, which the town thinks is haunted. O'Rourke wonders why Sforza always says "Good Evening" no matter the time of day. Agarn thinks he's a vampire. O'Rourke says that Sforza comes out during the day, so he can't be a vampire. Jane tells Parmenter that she is making a delivery to Sforza's mansion. That night, Jane isn't around for her date with Parmenter. Parmenter, O'Rourke and Agarn go to the Worthington mansion. Parmenter searches upstairs. O'Rourke disappears behind a trick wall. Parmenter finds Sforza asleep and gets stuck under his bed. Agarn thinks Parmenter was turned into a chicken. Sforza wakes up and the three try to get out of the house. Jane arrives and says she was in Carson City. Sforza explains things and they all realize he's not a vampire. Philo McCullough as Barfly.
57	23	"That's Show Biz"	Hollingsworth Morse	Arthur Julian	February 9, 1967
O'Rourke sees some of the men practicing to dance for the upcoming Military Ball. O'Rourke tells Parmenter that the stagecoach with the musicians is arriving. The musicians arrive and it's not the string quartet that O'Rourke was expecting. They are some young guys called the Bedbugs (The Factory). O'Rourke wants to just pay them off and send them back to Dodge. Agarn thinks they should give them a chance, but it doesn't work. One of the group tells Agarn they will make their fortune playing the saloon circuit. Agarn wants to resign from the Army to manage the Bedbugs. O'Rourke has a plan and has the band play at the town saloon. The men in the saloon start throwing things at the band on stage. O'Rourke tells Agarn to have the group spend the night at the Hekawi camp. O'Rourke gives Agarn reenlistment papers. Wild Eagle thinks the band could do well on the Teepee circuit. Agarn decides to stay their manager. O'Rourke wants to have Agarn think he's going deaf from the loud music. Agarn figures out their trick. Wrangler Jane says they should form a group, The Termites, to compete with the Bedbugs to get the Hekawi backing. Things work out and Agarn reenlists. Songs: Melody Patterson sings "Lemon Tree" and "Mr. Tambourine Man".
58	24	"The Day They Shot Agarn"	Hollingsworth Morse	Austin & Ima Kalish	February 16, 1967
Agarn is taken out of the guard house to face a firing squad. Major Hewitt (Fred Clark) arrives to oversee the execution. Dobbs reads the charges that Agarn is responsible for the death of Sgt. O'Rourke. Flashback to Major Hewitt bringing prisoner Cpl. Matt Delaney (Victor French) to Fort Courage. While Parmenter introduces Wrangler Jane to Hewitt, Delaney tries to get away but is caught. Agarn is chosen to escort Delaney to prison. O'Rourke thinks someone should go with Agarn, meaning himself. Parmenter decides to go and the three leave the fort. Before going to sleep, Parmenter and Agarn each handcuff themselves to Delaney. In the morning they realize no one brought the keys. The three run into Wild Eagle and Crazy Cat. Wild Eagle uses a tomahawk to cut the chain between Parmenter and Delaney's handcuffs. Delaney grabs Parmenter's gun and leaves with Agarn. The two run into Clem Hackett (Charles Seel), a Prospector. Delaney convinces Hackett that Agarn is the prisoner and Hackett seperates them. Agarn makes it back to the fort. Hewitt says that for letting Delaney escape, Agarn must complete his prison sentence. O'Rourke finds Delaney. Hewitt is lead to believe that Delaney killed O'Rourke. Back to the present. Just as Agarn is about to be shot, O'Rourke arrives with Delaney as his prisoner. John Mitchum, who appeared in season 1 as Pvt. Hoffenmueller, as Balladeer.
59	25	"Only One Russian Is Coming! Only One Russian Is Coming!"	Hollingsworth Morse	Arthur Julian	February 23, 1967
Agarn's look-alike Cossack cousin Dmitri Agarnoff (Larry Storch in a dual role) arrives in Fort Courage and becomes a rival for Wrangler Jane's affections.
60	26	"Guns, Guns Who's Got the Guns?"	Phil Rawlins	Arthur Julian	March 2, 1967
An inspector general insists that one of the troopers in F Troop is smuggling guns to the Apaches.
61	27	"Marriage, Fort Courage Style"	Phil Rawlins	Arthur Julian	March 9, 1967
Wrangler Jane hires a matchmaker (guest star Mary Wickes as Samantha "Marrying Sam" Oglesby) to get her married to Parmenter.
62	28	"Carpetbagging, Anyone?"	Phil Rawlins	Arthur Julian	March 16, 1967
A greedy land speculator (James Gregory) takes over Fort Courage, and the troop plans how to get the town back.
63	29	"The Majority of Wilton"	Phil Rawlins	Arthur Julian	March 23, 1967
After Parmenter comes down with a cold, everyone gives him alcohol-based remedies.
64	30	"Our Brave in F Troop"	Seymour Robbie	Austin & Ima Kalish	March 30, 1967
When O'Rourke and Agarn sneak Wild Eagle into F Troop to have his tooth pulled, he quickly gets promoted through the ranks by visiting General Courage (Cliff Arquette).
65	31	"Is This Fort Really Necessary?"	Hal March	Austin & Ima Kalish	April 6, 1967
The troop worries when an officer (Charles Drake) in charge of closing unnecessary forts arrives in Fort Courage.
