= Ed James (writer) =

American screenwriter (1908–1995)

- Born: Edward James; June 5, 1908
- Died: March 6, 1995 (aged 86); San Diego, California, U.S.
- Occupations: television writer, producer

Edward James (June 5, 1908 – March 6, 1995) was an American television writer and television producer during the 1950s and 1960s. Among his credits are contributions to the long-running television sitcoms Father Knows Best (based on the characters created by Ed James) and F Troop. He also produced the 1959 film No Place Like Home

== Career ==
James' career as a comedy writer spanned four decades, and encompassed work in both radio and television. After working as a freelance writer, it was in 1949 that he had the idea for the sitcom Father Knows Best. He wrote the pilot episode which aired on U.S. radio. The series later enjoyed a successful television run during the 1950s and early '60s. James went on to write for other shows, including Leave It to Beaver, F Troop and My Favorite Martian. He retired in 1972, and died 23 years later in San Diego, California.

== Television ==
- Lux Video Theater (1956–1957)
- Leave It to Beaver (1958)
- Armchair Theatre (1959)
- The Many Loves of Dobie Gillis (1959)
- No Place Like Home (1959) writer/producer
- Father Knows Best (1960)
- Shirley Temple's Storybook (1960)
- My Favorite Martian (1963)
- Petticoat Junction (1963–1964)
- Grindl (1964)
- The Addams Family (1964)
- My Three Sons (1963–1964)
- No Time for Sergeants
- F Troop (1965–1966)
- The Jean Arthur Show (1966)
- Family Affair (1967–1968)

== Personal life ==
Ed James married Louise E Neagley (a secretary at NBC) in 1955, a union which produced one daughter. He adopted another daughter during his previous marriage and adopted Louise's youngest son from her previous marriage. Ed and Louise were married until his death in 1995. Louise died in 2011.
