= Vic Tayback =

American actor (1930-1990)

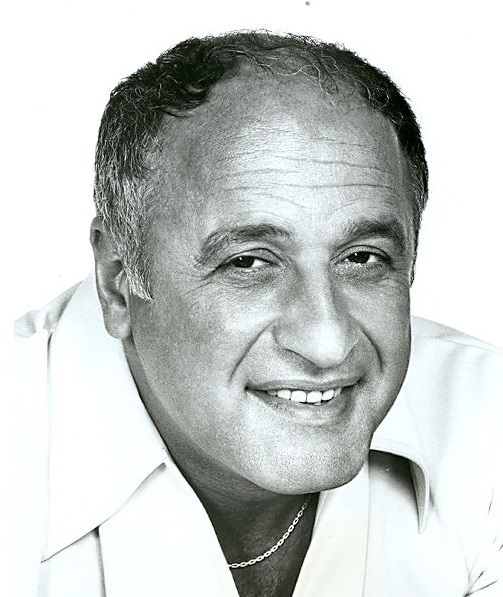
- Tayback in 1976
- Born: January 6, 1930; New York City, New York, U.S.
- Died: May 25, 1990 (aged 60); Glendale, California, U.S.
- Resting place: Forest Lawn Memorial Park
- Education: Glendale Community College; Actors Studio
- Occupation: Actor
- Years active: 1955–1989
- Known for: Alice; The Love Boat
- Spouse: Sheila Maureen Barnard (m. 1963)
- Children: 1

Victor Tayback (January 6, 1930 – May 25, 1990) was an American actor. He was best known for his role as diner owner Mel Sharples in both the movie Alice Doesn't Live Here Anymore (1974) and on the television sitcom Alice (1976–1985) that was based on it, as well as his multiple guest appearances on The Love Boat (1977–1987). The former earned him two consecutive Golden Globe Awards (for Best Supporting Actor in a Television Series) and a Primetime Emmy Award nomination for Outstanding Continuing Performance by a Supporting Actor in a Comedy Series.

== Early life ==
Tayback was born on January 6, 1930 in Brooklyn, New York, to Syrian Catholic immigrant parents Helen (née Hanood; Arabic: هيلين هنود تايباك) and Najeeb James Tayback (Arabic: نجيب جيمس طيبك) . Both of his parents had emigrated to the United States from Aleppo, Syria. He moved with his family to Burbank, California during his teenage years and attended Burbank High School, from which he graduated in 1948. He also attended Glendale Community College and the Frederick A. Speare School of Radio and TV Broadcasting.

== Career ==
Tayback served in the United States Navy before beginning his acting career at the age of 25. A lifetime member of the Actors Studio, he was a familiar face on television in the 1960s and 1970s, appearing on numerous series, including The Man from U.N.C.L.E., Star Trek, Bonanza, Here Come the Brides, That Girl, Gunsmoke, The Mary Tyler Moore Show, The Partridge Family, All in the Family, Fantasy Island, Columbo, Bewitched and The Love Boat. He also appeared in many films such as Bullitt (1968), Papillon (1973), The Gambler (1974), The Cheap Detective (1978), and All Dogs Go to Heaven (1989), as well as more than 25 stage productions, including Twelve Angry Men, The Diary of Anne Frank, Death of a Salesman, and Brighton Beach Memoirs. He was the co-founder of the theatre troupe Company of Angels. He also appeared in television commercials, notably in 1968 with Richard Dreyfuss for the AMC Javelin.

Tayback's most famous role was as diner owner Mel Sharples in both the film Alice Doesn't Live Here Anymore (1974) and the television series Alice (1976–1985). He was the only actor in the original film to reprise his role for the rest of the series. For the role, he was nominated for a Primetime Emmy Award in 1978 and won two consecutive Golden Globe Awards in 1980 and 1981. In 1971, he made a guest appearance as Dirks in season 16, episode 19 of the long-running CBS Western series Gunsmoke.

== Personal life ==
Tayback was married to Sheila Maureen Barnard (1932–2001) from March 16, 1963, until his death on May 25, 1990. They had one son.

== Death ==
Tayback died of a heart attack at age 60 on May 25, 1990. Tayback was pronounced dead at 1:56 a.m. at Glendale Adventist Medical Center, where he was taken after his wife called paramedics. She said he had climbed out of bed, taken a few steps and collapsed. Tayback was a lifelong smoker and had a history of heart problems. He had undergone a triple bypass in 1983.

He is buried at Forest Lawn Memorial Park (Hollywood Hills).

== Filmography ==
=== Film ===
- The Power of the Resurrection (1958) – Simon the Canaanite
- T-Bird Gang (1959) – Cop #1 at gas station
- Gangster Story (1959) – Norm, Resort Guard (uncredited)
- North to Alaska (1960) – Roustabout (uncredited)
- Five Minutes to Live (1961) – Fred Dorella
- With Six You Get Eggroll (1968) – Truck Driver
- Bullitt (1968) – Pete Ross
- Blood and Lace (1971) – Calvin Carruthers
- Emperor of the North Pole (1973) – Yardman
- The Blue Knight (1973) – Neil Grogan
- The Don Is Dead (1973) – Ralph Negri
- Papillon (1973) – Sergeant
- Thunderbolt and Lightfoot (1974) – Mario Pinski
- The Gambler (1974) – One
- Alice Doesn't Live Here Anymore (1974) – Mel Sharples
- Report to the Commissioner (1975) – Lieutenant Seidensticker
- Lepke (1975) – Lucky Luciano
- No Deposit, No Return (1976) – Big Joe
- The Big Bus (1976) – Goldie
- Special Delivery (1976) – Wyatt
- Mansion of the Doomed (1976) – Detective Simon
- The Shaggy D.A. (1976) – Eddie Roschak
- The Choirboys (1977) – Zoony
- The Cheap Detective (1978) – Lieutenant DiMaggio
- Treasure Island (1986) – Silver
- Weekend Warriors (1986) – Sergeant Burdge
- The Underachievers (1987) – Coach
- Loverboy (1989) – Harry Bruckner
- Beverly Hills Bodysnatchers (1989) – Lou
- All Dogs Go to Heaven (1989) – Carface Caruthers (voice)
- Horseplayer (1990) – George Samsa (final film role)

=== Television ===
- Alice (1976–1985) as Mel Sharples
- Griff as Captain Barney Marcus
- Khan! (1975) as Lieutenant Gubbins
- I Dream of Jeannie as Turhan (episode: "This Is Murder")
- Buckskin (episode: "The Battle of Gabe Pruitt") – Claude
- Alfred Hitchcock Presents (season 4 episode 7: "A Man with a Problem") (1958) – Man Talking to Cab Driver
- 77 Sunset Strip (episode: "Trouble in the Middle East") (1960) - Bearded Rebel
- Rawhide (episode: "The Gray Rock Hotel") (1965) – Monte
- F Troop (episode: "Corporal Agarn's Farewell To The Troops") (1965) – Bill Colton
- The Man from U.N.C.L.E. (episode: "The Re-Collectors Affair") (1965) – Sargent
- Daniel Boone (episode: "Onatha") (1966) – Hongas
- Family Affair (episode 8 season 1: "Who's Afraid of Nural Shpeni?") (1966) – Policeman
- Gunsmoke (episode: "Ladies From St. Louis") (1967) – Gaines; (episode: "The Fugitives S18E7") (1972) – Bill Hankins
- Get Smart (episode: "Appointment in Sahara") (1967) – Jamal
- The Monkees (1966-1967) - George / Rocco / Chuche
- Here Come the Brides (1968–1970)
- Star Trek: The Original Series (1968) (episode: "A Piece of the Action") – Jojo Krako
- That Girl (season 3 episode 12) (1968) – Max
- Lancer (episode: "Devil's Blessing") (1969) – Porter
- The Bill Cosby Show (episode: "The Fatal Phone Call") (1969) – Calvin
- Bonanza (episode: "Caution, Easter Bunny Crossing") (1970) – Everett Gaskell
- The Partridge Family (episode: "Danny and the Mob") (1971) – Rocco
- The Mary Tyler Moore Show (episode: "Second Story Story") (1971) – Officer Jackson
- Bewitched (episode: "The Good Fairy Strikes Again") (1971) – Officer #1
- Columbo (episode: "Suitable for Framing") (1971) – Sam Franklin
- The F.B.I. (1971-1972) – Ed Larch / Neil Parks
- Arnie (episode: "Boom or Bust") (1972) – Sergeant
- The Bold Ones: The New Doctors (episode: "Is This Operation Necessary?") (1972) – Frank Wells
- The Rookies (episode: The Commitment) (1972) - Gus Caldwell
- Emergency! (episode: "Boot") (1973) – Truck Driver
- All in the Family (episode: "Et Tu, Archie?") (1974) – Joe Tucker
- The Rookies (episode: Take Over) (1974) - Brakow
- Barney Miller (episodes: "Stakeout", "The Social Worker") (1975) – Mr. Savocheck / Master Forger
- The Practice (episode: "The Choice") (1976) – Frankie Nyles
- Mary Hartman, Mary Hartman (episode 29, season 1) (1976)
- Hawaii Five-O (episodes: "Bones of Contention"; "Angel in Blue") (1975–1978) – Martin Lynch / Parmel
- The Eddie Capra Mysteries (episode: "How Do I Kill Thee?") (1978) – Logan
- Getting Married (1978) – Burt Carboni
- $weepstake$ (episode: "Billy, Wally and Ludmilla, and Theodore") (1979) – Sergeant Yarbrough
- Flo (episode: "What Are Friends For?") (1981) – Mel Sharples
- Fantasy Island (1979–1983) – George Walters / Laura Walters / Norman Atkins / Chet Nolan / Melvyn Mews
- T. J. Hooker (episode: "Hooker's War") (1982) – Lieutenant Pete Benedict
- Hotel (episode: "Relative Loss") (1983) – Wallace Egan
- Finder of Lost Loves (episode: "Maxwell Ltd: Finder of Lost Loves Pilot") (1984) – Thomas Velasco
- Murder, She Wrote (episode: "One Good Bid Deserves a Murder") (1986) – Sal Domino
- Crazy Like a Fox (episode: "The Duke Is Dead") (1986) – Pete Ross
- The Love Boat (1977–1987) – Himself / Jack Hamilton / Shelley Sommers / 'Dutch' Boden / Sergeant Harry Beluski / Harry Stewart
- Adderly (1987) – Gregorin
- Tales from the Darkside (episodes: "The New Man" (as Alan Coombs), Season 1, 1984, and "Basher Malone" (as Tippy Ryan), Season 4, 1988)
- MacGyver (1990, episode: "Jenny's Chance") – George Henderson (final television appearance)

== Awards and nominations ==
| Award | Year | Category | Work | Result |
|---|---|---|---|---|
| Golden Globe Award | 1980 | Best Supporting Actor in a Television Series | Alice | Won |
| Golden Globe Award | 1981 | Best Supporting Actor in a Series, Miniseries or Television Film | Alice | Won |
| Golden Globe Award | 1982 | Best Supporting Actor in a Series, Miniseries or Television Film | Alice | Nominated |
| Primetime Emmy Award | 1978 | Outstanding Continuing Performance by a Supporting Actor in a Comedy Series | Alice | Nominated |

== See also ==
- Syrian Americans in New York City
