= Blood and Lace =

1971 film by Philip Gilbert

- Theatrical one-sheet
- Directed by: Philip Gilbert
- Written by: Gil Lasky
- Produced by: Ed Carlin; Gil Lasky
- Starring: Gloria Grahame; Milton Selzer; Len Lesser; Vic Tayback; Melody Patterson
- Cinematography: Paul Hipp
- Edited by: Marcus Tobias
- Production companies: Contemporary Filmmakers; Carlin Company
- Distributed by: American International Pictures
- Release date: February 12, 1971 (Chicago)
- Running time: 87 minutes
- Country: United States
- Language: English
- Budget: $200,000

Blood and Lace is a 1971 American exploitation horror film directed by Philip Gilbert, written by Gil Lasky, and starring Gloria Grahame, Melody Patterson, Len Lesser, and Milton Selzer. The film follows an orphaned teenager (Patterson) who arrives at a remote orphanage run by a madwoman (Grahame) and her handyman, both sadists and child murderers.

Shot in Los Angeles in 1970 and released theatrically in early 1971, Blood and Lace became a frequent billing on the drive-in theater circuit throughout the 1970s. At the time, it was considered to be one of the most graphic American films to receive what was then known as the GP rating, precursor to the modern PG rating; it would later be re-rated R upon its release on home video. It has been cited as a progenitor of the modern slasher film.

== Plot ==
Teenager Ellie Masters is orphaned after her prostitute mother and one of her johns are beaten to death with a hammer, and the house set on fire. Calvin Carruthers, a detective investigating Ellie's mother's murder, takes an avid interest in her well-being. Ellie is sent to an isolated orphanage run by the sadistic Mrs. Deere, and her handyman, Tom Kredge. The day before Ellie arrives, one of the orphans, Ernest, attempts to escape, and is chased by Kredge, who cuts off his hand and leaves him to bleed to death.

After arriving at the orphanage, Ellie soon finds that Mrs. Deere runs it like a workhouse, and the children are forced to complete incessant physical tasks while she and Kredge split the monthly welfare checks. Harold Mullins, a social worker responsible for overseeing the orphanage, is easily swayed by Mrs. Deere and overlooks inconsistencies he observes in the house. Before Mullins arrives to inspect the orphanage and complete a head count, Mrs. Deere and Kredge retrieve the bodies of several deceased orphans from a basement freezer, and pose them in beds in the infirmary to appear as though they are ill. Also stored in the freezer is the body of Mrs. Deere's dead husband, whom she occasionally speaks to as though he is alive.

Carruthers visits Ellie at the orphanage, and she confides to him that Mrs. Deere and Kredge are exploiting the children. Meanwhile, Ellie's roommate, a teenaged girl named Bunch, grows jealous as Ellie competes for the affection of Walter, a 21-year-old who helps Mrs. Deere around the house. Ellie is disturbed when she finds Jennifer, one of the orphans, has been tied up in the attic for days on end after attempting to run away; Ellie tries to give Jennifer water, but is stopped by Kredge. Ellie soon makes a plan to run away herself and find her biological father. Kredge agrees to help Ellie run away under false pretenses, and attempts to sexually assault her when she meets him in the basement; Mrs. Deere, however, stops the rape attempt. Ellie confronts Mrs. Deere about Jennifer, and expresses concern that she might die. Mrs. Deere explains calmly that even if Jennifer should die, that advancements in medical science will soon allow the dead to be revived anyway.

That night, Ellie awakens to a masked figure standing over her bed with a hammer, but Mrs. Deere assures her it was only a nightmare. The next morning, Ellie attempts to run away after finding Walter in bed with Bunch; she retrieves a suitcase, but upon opening it finds Ernest's severed hand. She screams in terror and attempts to flee, but Kredge locks her in the basement freezer. Pete, one of the orphans, witnesses this and attempts to warn the others. Mullins arrives at the house to inquire about the missing children and threatens to involve the police, prompting Kredge and Mrs. Deere to murder him and bring his body to the freezer. In the basement, the masked figure appears and attacks Kredge, killing him. Ellie manages to escape in the melee, and the masked figure chases her into the woods. Mrs. Deere drags Kredge's body into the freezer, but is locked inside by Jennifer, who has been freed from the attic.

In the woods, Ellie finds Ernest's corpse before being confronted by the masked figure in a clearing, who reveals himself as Detective Carruthers. He explains that he knows Ellie killed her mother, and that his suspicions of Mrs. Deere and Kredge led him to try and drive Ellie to run away in order to observe how Mrs. Deere would respond. Carruthers reveals he is romantically interested in Ellie, and uses his knowledge of her crime to blackmail her into marrying him. After she agrees, Carruthers admits to Ellie that her mother lost her virginity to him. Realizing she has agreed to marry her father, Ellie laughs hysterically.

== Cast ==
- Gloria Grahame as Mrs. Deere
- Melody Patterson as Ellie Masters
- Milton Selzer as Mr. Mullins
- Len Lesser as Tom Kredge
- Vic Tayback as Calvin Carruthers
- Terri Messina as Bunch
- Ronald Taft as Walter
- Dennis Christopher as Pete
- Peter Armstrong as Ernest
- Maggie Corey as Jennifer
- Mary Strawberry as nurse
- Louise Sherrill as Edna Masters
- Joe Durkin as unidentified man

== Production ==
The film's writer and producer, Gil Lasky, was a real estate developer in Southern California who first worked as a producer on Spider Baby (1967).

=== Filming ===
Blood and Lace was shot in 1970 in Los Angeles and Orange County, California on a budget of $200,000 with the exterior forest scenes being shot in Runyon Canyon, which at the time was private property. Louise Sherrill, who appears in the opening sequence as Ellie's mother, was a horror film enthusiast who had previously directed The Ghosts of Hanley House (1968). Sherrill helped secure the house used in the film as the Deere Orphanage, located on Franklin Avenue; the residence was uninhabited at the time of filming.

Star Melody Patterson was quoted as saying the production was enjoyable, as well as lauding Gloria Grahame's presence on-set. Patterson became ill with the flu early into production, which impacted her speaking voice. Because of this, her voice in the film's opening scene was dubbed in post-production by actress June Foray.

The film bore the working title The Blood Secret, which appears on its original print. It was, however, changed to Blood and Lace upon its theatrical release.

=== Music ===
Given the film's minuscule budget, the filmmakers utilized music and sound effects from free library archives, resulting in compositions and sonic elements reminiscent of 1950s and 1960s horror and monster movies.

== Release ==
In December 1970, it was announced that American International Pictures had acquired the film for distribution. Blood and Lace opened at the McVicker's Theater in Chicago on February 12, 1971, before screening in Knoxville, Tennessee on March 3, 1971. It showed at drive-ins in Kansas City, Missouri the weekend of March 5, 1971, and in Phoenix, Arizona theaters in early March.

The film became a regular at American drive-in theaters on double bills with other horror films: It was paired with such films as Curse of the Crimson Altar (1968), Horror House (1970), Count Yorga, Vampire (1970), House of Dark Shadows (1970), Circus of Horrors (1960), and Murders in the Rue Morgue (1971). Many drive-ins also screened the film alongside an array of Vincent Price films.

=== Home media ===
Blood and Lace was unavailable on home media for decades after its theatrical showings, failing to receive a VHS release. The film received a Blu-ray/DVD combo release from Shout! Factory on November 24, 2015, marking its first-ever home media release. For this release, the film was re-rated R by the American Motion Picture Association for "some violence." This edition went out of print in 2019, though Kino Lorber would later reissue the film on Blu-ray in late 2024 as part of their Kino Cult sub-label.

== Reception ==
=== Critical response ===
Upon its release, Blood and Lace proved controversial for its violent content, particularly its opening murder scene, given that the film's GP rating allowed audience members of all ages to attend. In retrospect, Melody Patterson said that she had "never considered the film that gory because the effects were so bad. Even Vic Tayback's mask that he wears running around was phony looking."

The film received mostly negative critical reception. The New York Times said of the film: "There's a good deal of blood and a minimum of logic, or lace for that matter, in Blood and Lace, which was exposed in local theaters yesterday, to illustrate, we assume, that horror can be both vague and silly... [it is] a low-grade exercise in shadows, screams, traumas and slayings that are largely more laughable than shocking." The New York Post said: "The story manages to keep you guessing all the way to its macabre end, if you can stand it that long." Ann Guarino of the New York Daily News said: "The cast tries to bring believability to the plot, but the audience couldn't help laughing in the wrong places." The Motion Picture Guide gave the film a middling review, stating that it "manage to keep some tension despite murky photography and muddy sound."

Lou Cedrone of The Evening Sun derided Blood and Lace as "a nasty, ugly little film that critics have labeled as low camp, but I can't go along with them", adding that the film should not be viewed by children despite is GP rating.

A review published in Variety was also mixed, noting: "Director Gilbert settles for fast pace to cover actors' inadequacies, [and] does manage to work up [a] nail-chewer climax... Miss Grahame makes some brave stabs at cutting through the silliness, but eventually succumbs to the uneven style of acting supplied by the remaining cast members."

=== Modern assessment ===
Although largely decried by critics upon its release, Blood and Lace developed a cult following through its presence as a regular drive-in bill as well as through television syndication in the late 1970s. The film's opening scene, which features a point-of-view shot of the killer wielding a hammer while ascending the stairs and entering a bedroom has been oft compared to similar sequences that appeared in later slasher films, such as Bob Clark's Black Christmas (1974) and John Carpenter's Halloween (1978).

Ken Hanley of Fangoria has credited the film as being one of the first American "proto-slasher films," predating Halloween, Black Christmas (1974), and The Texas Chain Saw Massacre (1974).

== See also ==
- List of American films of 1971

== Sources ==
- Arena, James (2011). Fright Night on Channel 9: Saturday Night Horror Films on New York's WOR-TV, 1973-1987. Jefferson, North Carolina: McFarland. ISBN 978-0-786-48891-9.
- Craig, Rob (2019). American International Pictures: A Comprehensive Filmography. Jefferson, North Carolina: McFarland. ISBN 978-1-476-66631-0.
- Lentz, Robert J. (2011). Gloria Grahame, Bad Girl of Film Noir: The Complete Career. Jefferson, North Carolina: McFarland. ISBN 978-0-78643-4831.
- Lisanti, Tom (2012). Drive-in Dream Girls: A Galaxy of B-movie Starlets of the Sixties. Jefferson, North Carolina: McFarland. ISBN 978-0-78647-1652.
- Shelley, Peter (2009). Grande Dame Guignol Cinema: A History of Hag Horror from Baby Jane to Mother. Jefferson, North Carolina: McFarland. ISBN 978-0-786-44569-1.
- Smith, Richard Harland (2015). Blood and Lace (Blu-ray audio commentary). Shout! Factory and Metro-Goldwyn-Mayer.
