= Milton Selzer =

American actor (1918–2006)

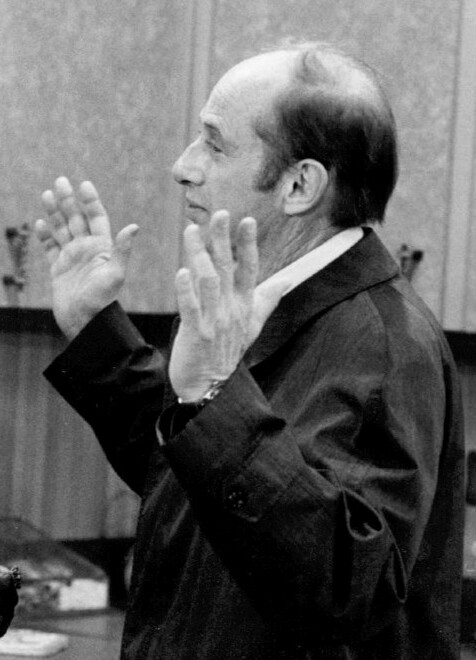
- Selzer in 1975
- Born: October 25, 1918; Lowell, Massachusetts, U.S.
- Died: October 21, 2006 (aged 87); Oxnard, California, U.S.
- Occupations: Film, stage, television actor
- Years active: 1954–1995
- Spouse: Alice Hickox (m. 1953)
- Children: 1

Milton Selzer (October 25, 1918 – October 21, 2006) was an American stage, film, and television actor.

== Early life ==
Born in Lowell, Massachusetts, Selzer and his family moved to Portsmouth, New Hampshire, where he was raised. After graduating from Portsmouth High School, he attended the University of New Hampshire before serving in World War II. He also attended the American Academy of Dramatic Arts and Erwin Piscator's Workshop of the School for Social Research. During World War II he was in the infantry in Italy.

== Career ==
Selzer's acting career began in summer stock theater after he completed his military service. After moving to Hollywood in 1960, he began a prolific career as a character actor making many guest appearances in film and television.

=== Stage ===
Selzer's Broadway credits include Tiger at the Gates (1955), Once Upon a Tailor (1954), Arms and the Man (1950), and Julius Caesar (1950). His debut as a professional director occurred in Houston in 1970 at the Alley Theatre.

=== Television ===
Selzer's many television roles included appearances on The Twilight Zone, where he portrayed an alien in "Hocus-Pocus and Frisby", and as the miserly son-in-law in "The Masks". He appeared as Dr. Nobel in an episode of Have Gun Will Travel, He appeared in an episode of The Asphalt Jungle in 1961. He made two memorable guest appearances on Perry Mason; in 1963 he played defendant and title character Dr. Aaron Stuart in "The Case of the Decadent Dean," and in 1964 he played murder victim Dr. Max Taylor in "The Case of the Bullied Bowler".

From 1965–67, he made seven guest appearances as Professor Parker in Get Smart followed by roles on That Girl, The Rat Patrol, Hogan's Heroes, and The Bold Ones: The Protectors. In the many crime shows of the 1960s and 1970s, Selzer would often portray unsympathetic characters who would also possess sad and often pathetic qualities. He was a regular on the 1973 situation comedy Needles and Pins as Julius Singer.

He made his last onscreen appearance in the 1995 television film Cagney & Lacey: Together Again.

=== Film ===
Selzer's film career includes roles in The Young Savages (1961) opposite Burt Lancaster, A Big Hand for the Little Lady (1966), In Enemy Country (1968), The Buddy System (1984) and Sid and Nancy (1986).

== Death ==
On October 21, 2006, four days before his 88th birthday, Selzer died of pulmonary complications.

== Filmography ==
=== Film ===
Year	Title	Role	Notes
1959	The Last Mile	Peddie	
1960	North to Alaska	Salvation Army Player	Uncredited
1961	The Young Savages	Dr. Walsh	
1963	The Yellow Canary	Vecchio	
1964	Marnie	Man at Track	
1965	The Cincinnati Kid	Sokal	
1966	A Big Hand for the Little Lady	Fleeson	Alternative title: Big Deal at Dodge City
1968	In Enemy Country	Bartowski	
1968	The Legend of Lylah Clare	Bart Langner	
1971	Blood and Lace	Harold Mullins	
1972	Lady Sings the Blues	The Doctor	
1975	Hey, I'm Alive	Glen Sanders	
1977	Another Man, Another Chance	Miller	Uncredited
1978	Capricorn One	Dr. Roger Burroughs	
1978	Blue Collar	Sumabitch	
1978	The Evil	The Realtor	
1980	Raise the Titanic	Dr. Vogel	Uncredited
1984	The Buddy System	Landlord	
1986	Sid and Nancy	Grandpa	
1987	Walker	Judge	
1988	Tapeheads	Merlin Hinkle	
1988	Shoot to Kill	Mr. Berger	Alternative title: Deadly Pursuit

=== Television ===
Year	Title	Role	Notes
1954–1955	You Are There	Demosthenes / General Knox / French Prisoner / Mahatma Gandhi	3 episodes
1954–1957	Studio One	2nd Guard / Gerald / Drunk / Harold Rich / Mr. Weston	6 episodes
1958–1959	Playhouse 90	Fernando / Second Convict	3 episodes
1959–1960	NBC Sunday Showcase	Julian Blumberg	3 episodes
1960–1970	Gunsmoke	Albert Schiller / Pa Hack / Painter / Jezra	4 episodes
1961	The Asphalt Jungle	The Professor - Doc Stehlmeyer / Lou Gordon	2 episodes
1961	The Detectives Starring Robert Taylor	Ozzie	Episode: "Act of God"
1961–1962	The Untouchables	Harry Garden, Jason Fiddler, Maxie Schram, Alan Sitkin	4 episodes
1961–1962	Have Gun – Will Travel	Dr. Alfred Nobel / Rabbi Reb Elya	2 episodes
1962	Route 66	Gunther	Episode: "From an Enchantress Fleeing"
1962	Stoney Burke	Dr. Laird	Episode: "The Wanderer"
1962–1964	The Twilight Zone	Alien / Wilfred Harper	Episodes: "Hocus-Pocus and Frisby" and "The Masks"
1963	Combat!	Col. Glinski	Episode: "Gideon's Army"
1963	Perry Mason	Dr. Aaron Stuart	Episode: "The Case of the Decadent Dean"
1964	The Man from U.N.C.L.E.	Dr. Shtallmacher	Episode: "The Green Opal Affair"
1964	Voyage to the Bottom of the Sea	Dr. Charles Melton	Episode: "The Blizzard Makers"
1964	Perry Mason	Dr. Max Taylor	Episode: "The Case of the Bullied Bowler"
1965	The Fugitive	Lou Cartwright / Ben Willoughby	2 episode
1965	A Man Called Shenandoah	Captain Crowell	Episode: "The Fort"
1965–1966	Get Smart	Professor Parker	7 episodes
1966	That Girl	Al Morgenthaler	Episode: "Time for Arrest"
1966–1967	The Rat Patrol	Tobar / Colonel Martin Schweiger	2 episode
1966–1973	The F.B.I.	William Sampson / Lou Dubbins / Jordan James Alexander / Mr. Ragatzy / Miller	5 episodes
1967	The Invaders	A.J. Richards	Episode: "Quantity: Unknown"
1967–1968	Hogan's Heroes	Otto Von Krubner, Sgt. Franks	2 episodes
1967–1972	Mission: Impossible	Dr. Erich Rojak / Stanley / Inspector Koder / Jan Vornitz	5 episodes
1968–1978	Hawaii Five-0	Ghoriades / Kellman / Sam Green / Tabernash / Ron / Lester Willighby	6 episodes
1969–1973	Mannix	Albie / Lt. Maury Strauss / Dave Wright	3 episodes
1971	Green Acres	Danny (Bank Robber)	Episode: "Star Witness"
1971	The Bill Cosby Show		Season 2, Episode 26
1972	Awake and Sing!	Myron Berger	PBS - TV
1973	Needles and Pins	Julius Singer	3 episodes
1974	Barnaby Jones	Sam Benson	Episode: "The Platinum Connection"
1974	The Bob Newhart Show	Principal Brimskill	Episode: "A Matter of Principal"
1974	Kojak	Consigliere Nathan Davidoff	2 episodes
1975	The Jeffersons	Mr. Wexler	Episode: "The Good Life Is Bad for Louise"
1975	Barney Miller	Murray Grossman (Delicatessen Owner)	Episode: "Bureaucrat"
1975–1978	The Rockford Files	Irving Rockfelt / Patrick Elber	2 episodes
1976	All in the Family	Dr. Seymour Shapiro	Episode: "Archie's Operation: Part 1"
1977	Sanford and Son	Sam Gittleman	Episode: "Funny, You Don't Look It"
1977	The Feather and Father Gang	Gardella	Episode: "For the Love of Sheila"
1978	The Harvey Korman Show	Jake Winkleman	4 episodes
1979	Wonder Woman	Captain Louie	Episode: "Going, Going, Gone"
1978–1980	Quincy, M.E.	Mr. Avery / Mr. Jackson	Episodes: "Crib Job" and "Deadly Arena"
1980	Little House on the Prairie	Elija Pattman	Episode: "New Beginning"
1981	The People vs. Jean Harris	Dr. Roth	Television film
1981	The Adventures of Nellie Bly	Dr. Woodville	Television film
1982	Lou Grant	Claude Cunningham	Episode: "Ghosts"
1983	Hill Street Blues	Murray Kaplan	2 episodes
1984	Trapper John, M.D.	Mr. Trankis	Episode: "The Jackpot Pays Off"
1985	Berrenger's		Episode: "Maelstrom"
1986	St. Elsewhere	Rabbi Tolkien	Episode: "Once Upon a Mattress"
1987	L.A. Law	Judge Morris Hood	3 episodes
1988	A Year in the Life	Max	Episode: "Fathers and Other Strangers"
1989–1990	The Famous Teddy Z	Abe Werkfinder	20 episodes
1990	MacGyver	Itzak 'Izzy' Zimmer; Otto Romburg	2 episodes
1991	Doogie Howser, M.D.	The Judge	Episode: "Doogie Has Left the Building: Part 1"
1992	Miss Rose White	Uncle Shimon	Television film
1993	Down the Shore	Dr. Feldman	Episode: "Test of Strength"
1994	Valley of the Dolls	Manny Henry	65 episodes
1995	Walker, Texas Ranger	Larry	Episode: "The Big Bingo Bamboozle"
