= F Troop =

American Western television series (1965–1967)

- Opening title showing the cannon knocking down the watchtower
- Genre: Sitcom; Western
- Created by: Seaman Jacobs; Ed James; Jim Barnett
- Starring: Forrest Tucker; Larry Storch; Ken Berry; Melody Patterson; Frank de Kova; James Hampton; Bob Steele; Joe Brooks
- Theme music composer: William Lava; Irving Taylor
- Composers: William Lava; Frank Comstock
- Country of origin: United States
- Original language: English
- No. of seasons: 2
- No. of episodes: 65 (list of episodes)

Production
- Executive producers: William T. Orr (1965–1966); Hy Averback (1966–1967)
- Producers: Hy Averback (1965–1966); Herm Saunders (1966–1967)
- Camera setup: Single-camera
- Running time: 25:30
- Production company: Warner Bros. Television

Original release
- Network: ABC
- Release: September 14, 1965 – April 6, 1967

F Troop is an American Western satirical television sitcom that ran from September 14, 1965 to April 6, 1967, with a total of 65 episodes, airing for two seasons on ABC. The show is about U.S. soldiers and American Indians in the Wild West during the 1860s. The first season of 34 episodes was broadcast in black-and-white and the second season was in color.

The series relied heavily on character-based humor, verbal and visual gags, slapstick, physical comedy, and burlesque comedy. The series played fast and loose with historical events and persons, and often parodied them for comical effect. Some indirect references were made to the culture of the 1960s, such as a "Playbrave Club", a parody of a Playboy Club, and two rock-and-roll bands, one of which performs songs written in the 1960s.

== Setting and story ==
F Troop is set at Fort Courage, a fictional United States Army outpost in the Old West, soon after the American Civil War. Fort Courage was named for the fictitious General Sam Courage (portrayed by Cliff Arquette). A town of the same name is adjacent to the fort. The fort is constructed in the stockade style typically found in most American Westerns.

The commanding officer is the gallant although laughably clumsy Captain Wilton Parmenter (Ken Berry), who is descended from a long line of distinguished military officers. He is awarded the Medal of Honor after accidentally instigating the final Civil War charge at the Battle of Appomattox Court House. Serving as a private in the Quartermaster Corps, he is ordered to fetch the commanding officer's laundry (presumably General Grant's). As Parmenter rides off to get the laundry, he repeatedly sneezes. A group of Union soldiers mistake his sneezing for an order to attack, turning the tide of the battle and "earning" Parmenter the nickname "the Scourge of Appomattox". He also is awarded the Purple Heart after he is accidentally pricked in the chest by his father and commanding officer while receiving his first medal, making him "the only soldier in history to get a medal for getting a medal." He is promoted to captain of remote Fort Courage, a dumping ground for the Army's "least useful" soldiers and misfits; the Secretary of War (William Woodson) notes, "Why, the Army sent them out there hoping they'd all desert." Indeed, of the three commanding officers at Fort Courage before Captain Parmenter, two did desert, while the third suffered a nervous breakdown.

Much of the humor of the series derives from the scheming of Captain Parmenter's somewhat crooked but amiable non-commissioned officers, Sergeant Morgan O'Rourke (Forrest Tucker) and Corporal Randolph Agarn (Larry Storch). They, in league with the fictitious American Indian tribe, the Hekawis—led by Chief Wild Eagle (Frank de Kova)—are always seeking to expand and conceal their shady souvenir business, covertly and collectively referred to as "O'Rourke Enterprises". Initially, rations and pay were drawn for 30 men at Fort Courage, though only 17 are actually accounted for; the other 13, according to O'Rourke, are Indian scouts who only come to the fort at night and leave before dawn). The pay for the fictitious scouts is apparently used to help finance O'Rourke's operation. Although O'Rourke and Agarn try to take full advantage of Captain Parmenter's innocence and naïveté — Parmenter is referred to as "Great White Pigeon" by Wild Eagle — they are also very fond of and fiercely protective of him. Parmenter also struggles to exert his authority outside the ranks. Very bashful, he tries to escape the matrimonial plans of his girlfriend, the amorous shopkeeper–postmistress Jane Angelica Thrift, known locally as "Wrangler Jane" (played by Melody Patterson)—though he becomes a bit more affectionate toward her during the second season. Patterson was 15 when she was cast as Jane, but claimed to be 18.

The episode "Captain Parmenter, One Man Army" reveals that all of the soldiers (troopers) of "F Troop" have been at Fort Courage for at least 20 months, meaning they spent at least part of the Civil War there. They are so incompetent that when they are formed into a firing squad in the episode titled "The Day They Shot Agarn", all of their shots miss Agarn despite the fact they are standing only a few yards from him. The most common running gag through both seasons of the series (shown in every first season opening except for the pilot episode) involves the fort's lookout tower. Every time the cannon is fired in salute, the lit fuse burns out. Corporal Agarn or Private Dobbs then kicks the cannon's right wheel, collapsing the cannon and causing it to fire off target. The cannonball strikes a support leg of the lookout tower, bringing it crashing to the ground along with the trooper in it. (In the opening credits, this coincides with the line in the lyrics, "Before they resume with a bang and a boom.") In one episode, an arrow brings the tower crashing down, and in another, Parmenter yanks down the tower with a lasso. In another episode, loud music causes the tower to collapse. The fort water tower is also prone to this gag. In one variation, Vanderbilt, Parmenter, O'Rourke, and Agarn are standing in the water tower platform when a lone Indian, "Bald Eagle" (played by Don Rickles), tries to capture Fort Courage by scaling the tower and jumping on the platform; the combined weight causes the floor to collapse and "Bald Eagle" to be captured. In another variation of the cannon gag, the cannon collapses as it is fired, and blows up the fort's powder magazine, causing Agarn to be saved from a vengeful Chief Geronimo.

== Episodes ==
Season	Episodes	Originally released	
Season	Episodes	First released	Last released
1	34	September 14, 1965	May 10, 1966
2	31	September 8, 1966	April 6, 1967

== Characters ==
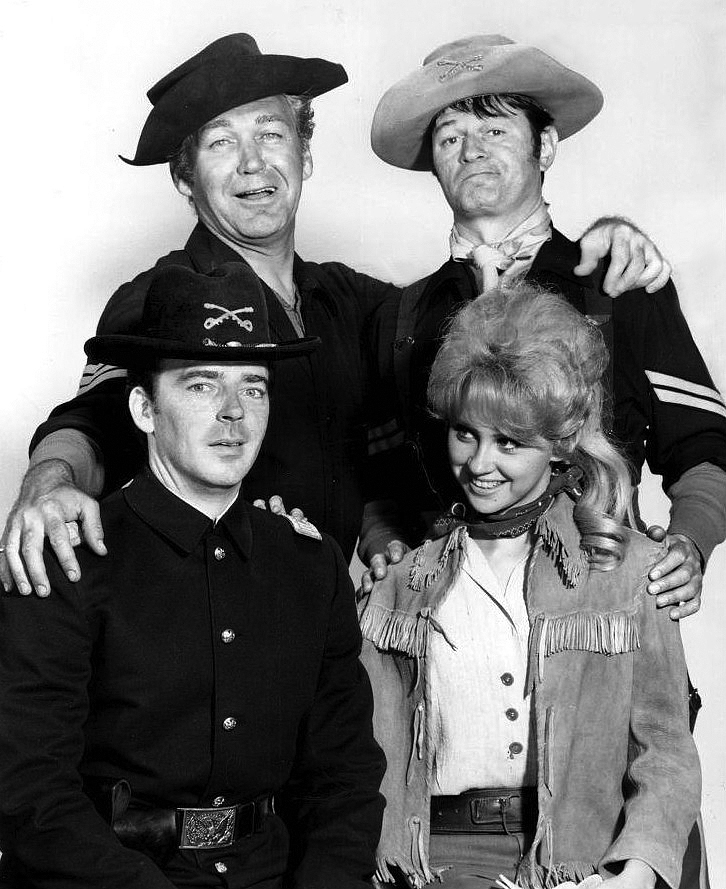
Main cast (clockwise from top left): Forrest Tucker, Larry Storch, Melody Patterson, Ken Berry

=== Main ===
==== F Troop officers and enlisted men ====
- Captain Wilton Parmenter (portrayed by Ken Berry) is the so-called "Scourge of the West." As military governor of the territory and commander of Fort Courage, he is credited with keeping peace. Parmenter is well-meaning and sweet-natured, although essentially clueless and a bit gullible. He also invariably is kind and encouraging to his men, and always bravely leads them into action, albeit ineptly. Parmenter, born in Philadelphia, comes from a "proud family" with a history of serving in the military.
- Sergeant Morgan Sylvester O'Rourke (portrayed by Forrest Tucker) is originally from Steubenville, Ohio, and has been in the Army at least 25 years. O'Rourke's business dealings involve illegally running the local town saloon and an exclusive-rights treaty with the Hekawi to sell souvenirs to tourists. Though most of his business schemes fail, he apparently is the only competent soldier in F Troop. O'Rourke is stated to be a veteran of the Mexican–American War.
- Corporal Randolph Agarn (portrayed by Larry Storch) is O'Rourke's somewhat dimwitted sidekick and business partner in the shady O'Rourke Enterprises. Agarn, originally from Passaic, New Jersey, took six years after enlistment to become a lowly corporal. At the time of the series, Agarn has been in the cavalry for 10 years, and has been posted to Fort Courage for four years.
- Bugler Private Hannibal Shirley Dobbs (portrayed by James Hampton) is F Troop's inept bugler, originally from New Orleans, who can only play "Yankee Doodle" and "Dixie" with regularity. A southern "mama's boy", he is also Captain Parmenter's orderly, as well as serving in the fort's cannon crew—usually with disastrous results. Private Dobbs is a personal thorn in Agarn's side, with his regular taunts resulting in Agarn's frequent retort, "I'm warning you, Dobbs!", even threatening him with a court-martial.
- Trooper Vanderbilt (portrayed by Joe Brooks) is the fort's lookout, who seems all but blind even with glasses (20/900 in each eye, according to Agarn) and answers questions from the lookout tower about what he sees with incongruous responses. In one episode, he shoots his pistol in a crowded barracks—and manages to miss everyone. Vanderbilt was a bustle inspector in a dress factory before joining the Army.
- Trooper Duffy (portrayed by Bob Steele) is an aged, old-time cavalryman with a limp. He claims to be the lone survivor of the siege of the Alamo in 1836, and enjoys recounting his exploits with Davy Crockett and Jim Bowie, "shoulder to shoulder and backs to the wall" roughly 30 years before joining F Troop. However, no one ever seems to take his claim seriously, and he may be engaged in telling tall tales.

==== Townspeople ====
- "Wrangler" Jane Angelica Thrift (portrayed by Melody Patterson) is Captain Wilton Parmenter's beautiful but tomboyish, feisty, romantically aggressive Annie Oakley-like girlfriend, dressed in buckskins and a cowgirl hat. She owns Wrangler Jane's Trading Post and runs the U.S. post office in town. She is a telegrapher and the best sharpshooter in the territory. Whenever the fort is attacked, she fights alongside everyone else, usually shooting more Indians than everyone else. She is determined to marry the ever-romantically elusive and naïve Parmenter and is often obliged to rescue him from his various predicaments.

==== The Hekawi tribe ====
The Hekawi are a small Native American tribe who live an indeterminate distance from Fort Courage. In "Reunion for O'Rourke", Chief Wild Eagle explains how the tribe got its name: "Many moons ago, tribe leave Massachusetts because Pilgrims ruin neighborhood! Tribe travel west, over stream, over river, over mountain, over mountain, over river, over stream! Then come big day... tribe fall over cliff. That when Hekawi get name. Medicine man say to my ancestor, "I think we lost. Where the heck are we?". "Where the heck are we?" became "We're the Hekawi" (the original name for the tribe in the series, 'Fugawi', was changed after the censors discovered the sentence "Where the Fugawi?").

The Hekawis are often 50/50 partners with O'Rourke Enterprises. They make most of the company's products, usually in the form of Indian souvenirs and whiskey. They are peaceful (mainly due to cowardice) and are self-described as "the tribe that invented the peace pipe", "lovers, not fighters", and "proud descendants of cowards".

Frank de Kova as Chief Wild Eagle

- Chief Wild Eagle (portrayed by Frank de Kova) is the shrewd, cranky, but essentially good-natured leader of the Hekawi tribe, and business partner in O'Rourke Enterprises. Like all the Indian characters portrayed in F Troop, he speaks with a mock American Indian accent in a semibroken English dialect stereotypical of American Westerns.
- Crazy Cat (portrayed by Don Diamond) is Chief Wild Eagle's assistant and heir apparent. He often speculates on when he will become chief, but is subsequently rebuked by Chief Wild Eagle. Appearing sporadically in the early first-season episodes, Crazy Cat became a regularly featured character later in the first season, as Roaring Chicken and Medicine Man were phased out of the series.

=== Recurring ===
- Happy Bear/Smokey Bear (portrayed by Ben Frommer) is an overweight, usually silent Hekawi brave in black braids and a fire ranger's hat (a parody of Smokey Bear). In the first season, Frommer appears (usually uncredited) as Happy Bear, sometimes as Smokey Bear, once as Papa Bear, as Red Arrow, and a few times without a name. In the second season, he appears solely as Smokey Bear. Overall, Frommer appeared in 52 episodes.
- Trooper Duddleson (portrayed by Ivan Bell) is a sleepy, obese soldier, who is hit on the head repeatedly by Agarn for having his body in line, but not his belly, or sleeping when he is supposed to be at attention. According to his service record, Duddleson was a female impersonator with a carnival in civilian life.
- Trooper Hoffenmueller (portrayed by John Mitchum) is a trooper who can either only speak in his native German or speaks English with a German accent, depending upon the episode. According to his service record, Hoffenmueller can speak Cherokee, Sioux, Apache, and Hekawi.
- Stagecoach Driver (portrayed by Rudy Doucette) briefly appears in seven episodes, including one as Slim.
- Roaring Chicken (portrayed by Edward Everett Horton) is an ancient Hekawi medicine man and son of Sitting Duck.
- Pete (portrayed by Benny Baker), the bartender at the saloon, appears in five episodes.
- Charlie (portrayed by Harvey Parry and Frank McHugh) is the town drunk. The role was created especially for Parry to show off his skills (he was in his 60s by then, but appears in only three episodes).
- Major Duncan (portrayed by James Gregory) is Captain Parmenter's superior from the territory headquarters, who usually "brings a saddlebag full of trouble" according to O'Rourke.
- Secretary of War (portrayed by William Woodson) appears in three episodes.
- Trooper Leonard "Wrongo" Starr (portrayed by Henry Gibson) is a jinxed soldier. His name is a play on Beatles drummer Ringo Starr.
- Medicine Man (portrayed by J. Pat O'Malley) is an unnamed Hekawi "doctor", who prescribes various tribal dances to treat diverse ailments.

== Development and production ==
Although the show's opening credits claim F Troop was created by Richard Bluel, a final arbitration by the Writers Guild of America eventually gave Seaman Jacobs, Ed James, and Jim Barnett credit.

Episode writers included Arthur Julian (who, alone, wrote 29 of the 65 episodes; he also appeared as an undertaker in his "Survival of the Fittest" script), Stan Dreben (Green Acres), Seaman Jacobs, Howard Merrill (The Dick Van Dyke Show), Ed James, Austin and Irma Kalish, and the highly successful comedy writing duo of Tom Adair and James B. Allardice, who collaborated on some of the most successful American TV sitcoms of the 1960s, including The Munsters, My Three Sons, Gomer Pyle, USMC, and Hogan's Heroes.

The series was directed by Charles Rondeau and Leslie Goodwins, among many others, and produced by William T. Orr and Hy Averback. I. Stanford Jolley, Forrest Tucker's former father-in-law, appeared as Colonel Ferguson in the 1966 episode "Survival of the Fittest". The entire series was shot on the Warner Bros. backlot in Burbank, California.

The plot engine of O'Rourke and Agarn's moneymaking schemes echoed that of an American television series of the late 1950s, The Phil Silvers Show, which had featured swindling by the wily Sergeant Bilko, also based at a "peacetime" Army base — albeit in the mid-20th century, although with the twist of involving local preindustrial aboriginals with US military men in money-making schemes. It also echoes some of the money-making schemes found in the American television series McHale's Navy, which was written by some of the same writers from the Bilko show.

The concept of misfit troops sent out West bears some resemblance to the 1964 Western comedy Advance to the Rear.

Melody Patterson lied about her age to get the part of Wrangler Jane. She was 15 at the time of her audition, but turned 16 by the time filming started. As a result, the romance between Jane and Parmenter was kept very low key during the first season. By the time production of the second season started, Patterson had turned 17 and Parmenter's affections were made stronger and Jane was made more sexually aggressive (Patterson was 10 days short of turning 18 when the last episode was aired).

The show's ratings were still healthy after the second year (ranked number 40 out of 113 shows for the 1966–67 season, with a 31.3 share), but according to Tucker, Warner Bros.' new owners, Seven Arts, discontinued production because they thought it was wasteful for so much of the Warner Ranch to be taken up by a single half-hour TV show. Producer William Orr says the studio was also unhappy with the added costs of producing the show in color during its second season.

== Other media ==
Dell Comics published a seven-issue tie in series.

An illustrated hardcover book The Great Indian Uprising was published by Whitman in 1967. It was authored by William Johnston and illustrated by Larry Pelini.

A board game was published by Ideal Toy Company.

In July 1992, an F Troop feature film adaptation reportedly was in development with writer director Bob Logan with Leslie Nielsen and Martin Short being considered as Sylvester O'Rourke and Randolph Agarn, respectively. New Line Cinema and Permut Presentations were looking to produce the film with the intention of offering cameos to original cast members of the series. By September 1995, development on the film was ongoing and no longer at New Line and was apparently being considered by several other studios. The planned plot for the film was to center on an evil capitalist trying to shut down Fort Courage. Producer David Permut was planning to fill out the film's cast with alumni of The Kids in the Hall and Saturday Night Live, as well as play more blue humor in contrast to the original series with an early version of the script featuring a bad actress who goes by the name "Sleeps With Producer".

== Release ==
=== Broadcast and syndication ===
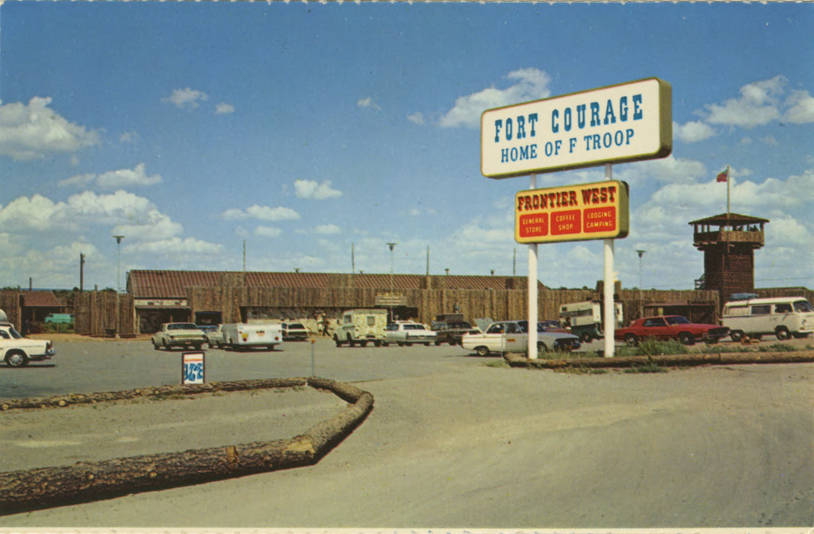
A replica of Fort Courage was built in Houck, Arizona, as a tourist attraction along Route 66.

Although only two seasons were produced, F Troop enjoyed a healthy second life in syndication. The show was a particular favorite on Nick at Nite in the 1990s, running from 1991 to 1995 despite an archive of only 65 episodes. Reruns began airing on TV Land from 1997 to 2000, GoodLife TV Network in 2004, and on MeTV on September 2, 2013. Circle Country previously carried the show since 2020. In the United Kingdom, reruns commenced in October 2017 on Sky TV channel Forces TV.

Reruns premiered on the ITV network in the United Kingdom on October 29, 1968, and were screened repeatedly until July 16, 1974. The series was also broadcast nationally in Australia on ABC-TV, in Ireland on Telefís Éireann, and in Italy during the '80s as a "filler" show during summers (when ratings usually dropped due to large numbers of people going on holidays).

=== Home media ===
In 1998, 30 of the series' 65 episodes were digitally remastered and released on 10 VHS tapes by Columbia House.

On September 27, 2005, Warner Home Video released the first F Troop DVD compilation as part of its "Television Favorites" series. The six-episode DVD included three black-and-white episodes and three color episodes. Following the successful sales from the "Television Favorites" sampler release, Warner Home Video released F Troop: The Complete First Season, with all 34 black-and-white episodes included. The Complete Second Season of F Troop was released on DVD on May 29, 2007. Both seasons of this show have been released on DVD by Warner Home Video. The DVD features interviews with original F Troop members, writers, and other production personnel, as well as behind-the-scenes information. However, only one major actor from the series, Ken Berry, was interviewed for the half-hour special. Also, audio segments were included of an interview with actor Joe Brooks (Private Vanderbilt).

The complete series has been released on iTunes in both standard-definition and remastered high-definition television. For the high-definition remaster, the original film elements were rescanned into high-resolution video.
