= Rod McGaughy =

American film and television actor (1923–2011)

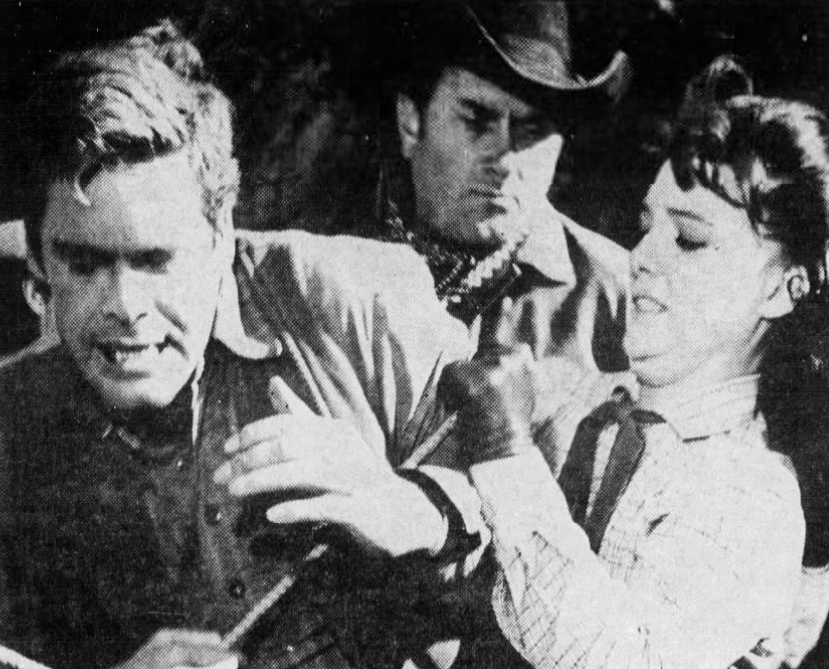
- McGaughy (center) with Doug McClure and Marilyn Wayne in The Virginian, 1965
- Born: Rodney Henry McGaughy; December 19, 1923; Los Angeles, California, U.S.
- Died: October 10, 2011 (aged 87); Westlake Village, California, U.S.
- Occupations: Film and television actor

Rodney Henry McGaughy (December 19, 1923 – October 10, 2011) was an American film and television actor.

== Life and career ==
McGaughy was born in Los Angeles, California, the son of Rubin McGaughy and Allie May, a member of the Order of the Eastern Star. He began his screen career in 1955, appearing in the syndicated western television series Annie Oakley. In 1958, he played an uncredited role of a townsman in an episode of the NBC western television series The Californians. During his screen career, he performed on rodeo, and was a stuntman in the 1965 film The Great Race.

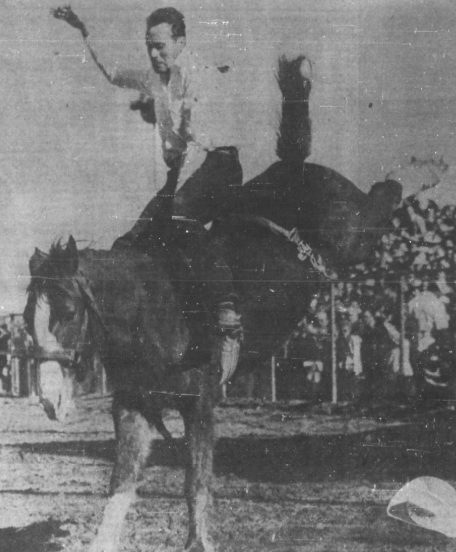
McGaughy performing on rodeo, 1956

Later in his career, McGaughy guest-starred in numerous television programs including Gunsmoke, Bonanza, Death Valley Days, The Untouchables, The Fugitive, The Waltons, Have Gun – Will Travel, The Life and Legend of Wyatt Earp, The Deputy, Wanted Dead or Alive, Tombstone Territory and The Virginian. He also appeared in numerous films such as Gunfight in Abilene, A Big Hand for the Little Lady, The Man Who Shot Liberty Valance, Support Your Local Gunfighter, Young Jesse James, Seven Ways from Sundown, Posse from Hell, Texas Across the River and Blazing Saddles.

McGaughy retired from acting in 1982, last appearing in the NBC historical drama television series Little House on the Prairie.

== Death ==
McGaughy died on October 10, 2011, in Westlake Village, California, at the age of 87.
