= Melody Patterson =

American actress (1949–2015)

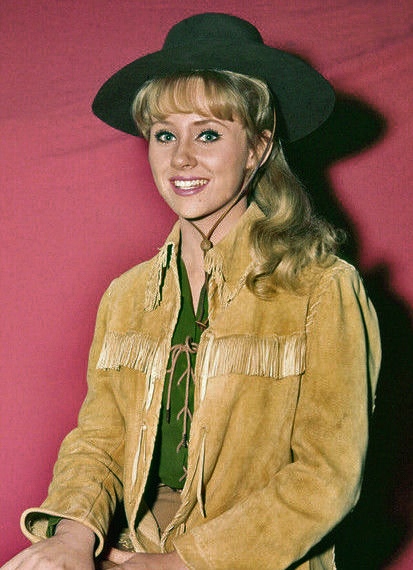
- Then 16-year-old Patterson on the set of F Troop (1966)
- Born: April 16, 1949; Inglewood, California, U.S.
- Died: August 20, 2015 (aged 66); Hollister, Missouri, U.S.
- Occupations: Actress, singer
- Years active: 1965–1989
- Spouses: James MacArthur (m. 1970; div. 1975) Robert Seaton (m. 1976; div. 1998) Vern Miller (m. 1998)

Melody Patricia Patterson (April 16, 1949, – August 20, 2015) was an American actress known for her role as Wrangler Jane in the 1960s television series F Troop and for her role as Ellie in the horror film Blood and Lace (1971).

== Early life ==
Melody Patterson was born on April 16, 1949, in Inglewood, California. She was the daughter of machinist Pat Patterson and the former Rosemary Wilson, an official in the Miss Universe contest. Her mother had been a dancer with Warner Bros., who "doubled for Joan Crawford in several films."

She started performing at the age of four, appearing in Mrs. McThing at the Downey Community Theatre in Downey, California. Patterson wrote and directed a play at the age of five. Before turning 10, she had also been a photographer's model, an actress, and an ice skater. In the ninth grade, she enrolled in the Hollywood Professional School. She continued her education in the Warner Bros. school while she acted on F Troop. She later studied at the American Academy of Dramatic Arts in New York City.

== Career ==
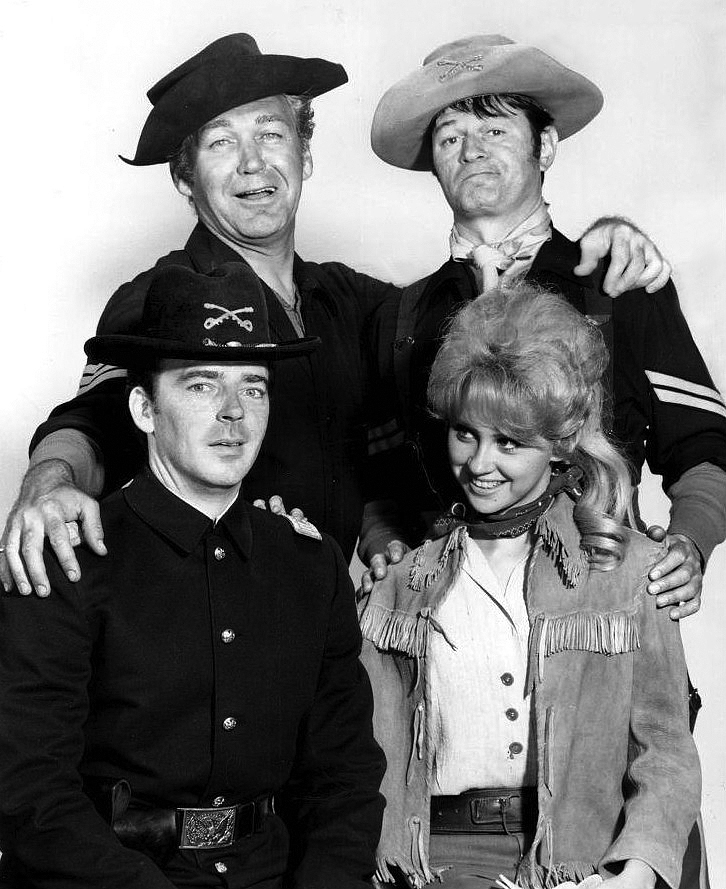
F Troop cast--clockwise from top, Forrest Tucker, Larry Storch, Patterson and Ken Berry. (1965)

Patterson in 1965 reportedly auditioned for F Troop on a lark. To her surprise, she was asked to read some lines from the script of the Doris Day Calamity Jane film, which happened to be Patterson's favorite movie, one that she had seen enough times on television to know "every scene and line from the film". Her reading impressed the producers and led to her being cast as Wrangler Jane. She, however, was not quite 16 years old, and she misrepresented her age in order to get the audition. Her comments about her efforts to secure the part were later quoted in an interview:

"I did well on the F-Troop audition and I knew it...So when the producers asked me, 'You're eighteen, right?' I didn’t argue with them. I said, 'Right.' Then they said, 'Well, you can ride a horse, right?' I didn’t argue about that either. I thought to myself, 'If I can just get tested, then I will have some film.' Then when they offered me the role, I thought, 'Well if I can just do the pilot I'll still be ahead of the game.'"

Once Patterson secured the part, she finally told the series' producers her real age. Their shock and consternation were ameliorated shortly thereafter by her maturity and professionalism. After the 1967 cancellation of F Troop, Patterson worked in television, radio, and the theater. She also appeared on Mr. Novak and Shindig! In the 1970s, she appeared in three episodes of Hawaii Five-O, and began modeling and appearing in television commercials.

Patterson's first screen appearance was an uncredited walk-on in Bye Bye Birdie (1963). Her first featured role was in the 1968 drama The Angry Breed. She also appeared in a lead role in the action film The Cycle Savages, with Bruce Dern, followed by a leading part in the slasher film Blood and Lace (1971). In 1973, she appeared in a small part in The Harrad Experiment (1973). Her final film credit was in The Immortalizer (1990), a direct-to-video sci-fi horror film.

While living in Hawaii, Patterson performed in the play Butterflies Are Free, with Barbara Rush and Dirk Benedict. She appeared in other plays such as House of Blue Leaves for the University of Hawaii, and played the part of Peggy in The Front Page written by Charles MacArthur, and directed by her then-husband James MacArthur (Charles' son).

In 1999, she received her bachelor's degree from Sierra Nevada College.

== Other activities in entertainment ==
Patterson entertained troops in Vietnam with the Johnny Grant and Friends show. Her first tour was in December 1967, with Diane McBain, Sherry Jackson, and Sabrina Scharf. Her second tour was in June 1968 with Vicki Lawrence and Karen MacQuarrie (Miss Welcome to Long Beach 1968). Patterson was a disc jockey for the Armed Forces Radio Service. She later wrote a column called "Wrapping with Wrangler" for Wildest Westerns magazine.

== Recognition ==
In 1965, the Motion Picture and Television Make-Up Artists and Hair Stylists group selected Patterson as one of 12 young actresses named Deb Stars of 1966. She was nominated by the Warner Bros. studio.

== Personal life ==
Patterson was married three times. She married actor James MacArthur in July 1970. MacArthur was known for playing Danny "Danno" Williams in the TV series Hawaii Five-O. She put her career aside to move to Honolulu, where the show filmed. They divorced in 1975. Her second marriage was to Robert Hill Crump Seaton, Jr., and ended in divorce April 29, 1998. Her last marriage was to aircraft mechanic Vern Miller on November 28, 1998, and ended with her death. Patterson had no children from those marriages.

== Death ==
Patterson died in a nursing home in Hollister, Missouri, on August 20, 2015, at age 66. Multiple organ failure was the reported cause. Her F Troop co-star Larry Storch (Corporal Agarn) announced her death on Facebook as follows: "It's with a heavy heart that we can let you know our beloved Wrangler Jane, Melody Patterson, passed away today. Our hearts are sad today. RIP Sweet Melody. We love you." Patterson was cremated and has no final resting place.

== Filmography ==
=== Film ===
Year	Title	Role	Notes
1963	Bye Bye Birdie	Teenager	Uncredited
1967	The Angry Breed	April Banner	
1969	The Cycle Savages	Lea	
1971	Blood and Lace	Ellie Masters	
1973	The Harrad Experiment	Jeannie	Uncredited
1990	The Immortalizer	Nurse Jane	

=== Television ===
Year	Series	Role	Notes
1965	Wendy and Me	Eleanor Martinson	S1.E28: "You Can Fight City Hall"
1965–67	F Troop	Wrangler Jane Angelica Thrift	65 episodes
1967	The Monkees	Ella Mae	S2.E7: "Hillbilly Honeymoon"
1968	Adam-12	Valerie	S1.E2: "Log 141: The Color TV Bandit"
1968	Green Acres	Lorelei Appleby	S4.E4: "Eb's Romance"
1969–74	Hawaii Five-O	Missy; Sherry Walsh; Kathy	S2.E12: "The Devil and Mr. Frog" (1969); S6.E21: "Nightmare in Blue" (1974); S7.E5: "Bomb, Bomb, Who's Got the Bomb?" (1974)
