= Joe Brooks (actor) =

American character actor

- Publicity Photo of Joe Brooks
- Born: John Joseph Brooks Jr. December 14, 1923; Los Angeles, California, U.S.
- Died: December 5, 2007 (aged 83); California, U.S.
- Occupation: Actor
- Years active: 1944–1986
- Spouse: Betty Jean Davis

John Joseph Brooks Jr. (December 14, 1923 – December 5, 2007) was an American character actor, best known for portraying Trooper Vanderbilt, the near-sighted soldier, in F Troop. He was born and died in Los Angeles, and began his acting career after graduating from high school; he had his first speaking part in the 1944 John Wayne film, The Fighting Seabees. During World War II, Brooks put his acting career on hold and served his country fighting in the South Pacific. He then returned to California and continued to act, mainly as an extra and in bit parts until he was called to audition for the role of Vanderbilt. His career spanned some 22 movies and numerous television appearances over 40 years. His other credits include the films East Of Eden (1955), Tall Man Riding (1955), The Young Lions (1958), Born Reckless (1958), Flaming Star (1960), Robin and the 7 Hoods (1964), Batman (1968), Pursuit (1972), The Bad News Bears (1976), Gremlins (1984), and Eye of the Tiger (1986), and the TV shows Rawhide, The Six Million Dollar Man, Bewitched, The Munsters, and Cheyenne.

His interment is located in Forest Lawn – Hollywood Hills Cemetery.
