= List of Titus episodes =

The following is the list of episodes of the American sitcom Titus as they are presented in U.S. broadcast order. The show ran on the Fox network for three seasons (2000–2002) airing 54 episodes; a two-part reunion episode/finale was livestreamed in 2020 and released in 2021 for paid download and viewing on Christopher Titus' website. It was added to YouTube on April 15, 2023.

== Series overview ==
Season	Episodes	Originally released	
Season	Episodes	First released	Last released
1	9	March 20, 2000	May 22, 2000
2	24	October 3, 2000	May 22, 2001
3	21	November 14, 2001	August 12, 2002
4	2	August 21, 2020	

== Episodes ==
=== Season 1 (2000) ===
No. overall	No. in season	Title	Directed by	Written by	Original release date	Prod. code	Viewers (millions)
1	1	"Dad's Dead"	Michael Lessac	Christopher Titus, Jack Kenny & Brian Hargrove	March 27, 2000	1ADK-01	13.15
Titus (Christopher Titus) and Dave (Zack Ward) become worried when their hard-nosed, alcoholic, chain-smoking, five-times-divorced father Ken (Stacy Keach) does not come out of his room for four days – not even to get a beer. Along with Titus' girlfriend, Erin (Cynthia Watros) and Titus' wimpy, normal friend, Tommy (Dave Shatraw), the brothers contemplate life without dad and how much Ken influenced their lives. NOTE: Though this was produced as the first episode, the next episode "Sex With Pudding" was the first episode broadcast on FOX. The complete season one and two DVD of Titus (as well as the complete series release on Christopher Titus' YouTube channel) has "Dad's Dead" as the premiere episode.
2	2	"Sex With Pudding"	Jeff Melman	Brian Hargrove & Jack Kenny	March 20, 2000	1ADK-09	14.19
Titus thinks Erin is cheating on him and goes to her place of work to find the culprit, only to discover there is no affair and that Erin is being sexually harassed.
3	3	"Dave Moves Out"	Jack Kenny	Sally Lapiduss	April 3, 2000	1ADK-06	9.22
Ken has Dave arrested for trying to steal a VCR. When Christopher admits to helping Dave move out, Ken has him arrested as an accomplice.
4	4	"The Breakup"	Howard Murray	Christopher Titus	April 10, 2000	1ADK-03	9.02
After a fight, Christopher and Erin break up – and proceed to sleep with other people.
5	5	"Titus Integritous"	Lee Shallat-Chemel	John Augustine & Jim Hope	April 17, 2000	1ADK-05	9.41
Titus refuses, on principle, to add a racing wing to a custom hot rod, while Tommy, Dave, Erin, and Ken try to change his mind when the customer offers a large check for the work.
6	6	"Red Asphalt"	Jack Kenny	Matt Rosenberg & Ritch Shydner	May 1, 2000	1ADK-07	8.15
While driving to his father's birthday party in a custom-made car for Ken, Titus and the gang become the target of a gun-toting motorist.
7	7	"Mom's Not Nuts"	Jeff Melman	Jack Kenny & Brian Hargrove	May 8, 2000	1ADK-02	9.24
Juanita, Christopher's violent, manic-depressive schizophrenic mother, comes over unannounced after being released from the mental hospital and put on Myocet for her mood swings. While Erin, Dave, Tommy, and Ken are relieved that she's gotten better, Christopher is on edge because he knows Juanita is a manipulative liar and her moments of sanity don't last.
8	8	"Intervention"	David Lee	Adam Belanoff	May 15, 2000	1ADK-04	8.53
Christopher, Erin, Tommy, and Dave stage an intervention for Ken Titus after learning that Ken has stopped drinking and his sobriety is making him a miserable, boring, old man. But when Ken has a drink and becomes his old self again, he gets revenge by revealing terrible secrets about Christopher, Dave, Tommy, and Erin.
9	9	"Episode Eleven"	Brian Hargrove	Christopher Titus	May 22, 2000	1ADK-08	7.83
Ken ends up in the hospital after his latest heart attack and blames Titus for causing it, as it was triggered by Ken trying to find the distributor cap to his boat and getting angry that Titus stole it. However, when a police officer shows Titus and Dave that Ken's heart attack and subsequent car crash was caused by Ken getting oral sex while driving (with his date, Angela, ending up with severe head injuries) and tells them that Ken could get his license revoked and be registered as a sex offender, the brothers decide to prank Ken for lying to them.

=== Season 2 (2000–01) ===
No. overall	No. in season	Title	Directed by	Written by	Original release date	Prod. code	Viewers (millions)
10	1	"Titus is Dead"	Jack Kenny	Jack Kenny & Brian Hargrove	October 3, 2000	2ADK-01	10.73
Following the events of "Episode Eleven", Titus tries to make up for the testicle-shaving prank that caused Ken's latest heart attack, but Ken declares Titus dead to him, even after he hires Kathy, the no-nonsense hospital nurse from the previous episode.
11	2	"The Test"	Brian Hargrove	Christopher Case	October 10, 2000	2ADK-02	10.63
In the wake of Ken's heart attack, Titus wrangles everyone into donating blood – but he and Erin face bigger problems when they both confess to not using protection when they cheated on each other, and Titus fears that he may have HIV.
12	3	"The Surprise Party"	Robert Berlinger	Tom Saunders & Kell Cahoon	October 17, 2000	2ADK-03	9.89
A surprise party to welcome Kathy into the family ends with Dave being kicked out of the house with all of his possessions on the lawn.
13	4	"What's Up, Hollywood?"	Kevin Rodney Sullivan	Sally Lapiduss	October 31, 2000	2ADK-04	7.53
After Titus customizes his father's truck, Christopher becomes suspicious when Ken congratulates him on a job well done. But Ken soon returns to his old self after getting busted for drunk driving and appearing on the local news (which Titus and Dave videotape).
14	5	"Locking Up Mom"	Jeff Melman	Christopher Titus	November 14, 2000	2ADK-06	9.56
Following the events of "Mom's Not Nuts", Christopher and the gang attend Juanita's (now played by Frances Fisher) competency hearing at the mental hospital. Ken is adamant about keeping her locked up, but Christopher has a change of heart after learning that Juanita's letters to him were discarded by Ken.
15	6	"The Perfect Thanksgiving"	Jeff Melman	Chris Sheridan	November 21, 2000	2ADK-05	10.03
A Thanksgiving dinner between the Tituses and the Fitzpatricks (Erin's Irish Catholic family, consisting of her unhappily married parents, Nora and Merritt; her drugged-out sister, Kim, and her homophobic, petty thug brother, Michael) turns into a brawl that ends with the two families in the hospital and Erin having doubts about being together with Christopher.
16	7	"Tommy's Girlfriend"	Robert Berlinger	Patrick Meighan	November 28, 2000	2ADK-08	10.65
A simple misunderstanding turns into a hostage situation when Tommy tries to reconcile with his ex-girlfriend (Nicole Sullivan), who claims that Tommy tried to rape her in high school when he came over her house naked.
17	8	"The Reconciliation"	Robert Berlinger	Jim Hope	December 12, 2000	2ADK-07	10.11
Juanita Titus comes to visit for a family dinner with her new boyfriend (who turns out to be the psychiatrist she's seeing about her mental illness), but Ken is less than happy to see her with a new man.
18	9	"The Last Noelle"	Jack Kenny	Jennifer Fisher	December 19, 2000	2ADK-10	10.33
Christopher attends the funeral of his first girlfriend, Noelle, but things get sticky when Erin discovers that Titus had another love before her and that Titus' first serious girlfriend was as abusive and manipulative as his mother.
19	10	"Sunday! Sunday! Sunday!"	Robert Berlinger	John R. Morey	January 9, 2001	2ADK-09	11.56
At a car show, Titus takes credit for Tommy and Dave's work, leading to a fight that threatens the future of Titus's shop.
20	11	"When I Say Jump"	Brian Hargrove	Christopher Case	January 16, 2001	2ADK-11	10.82
Titus and his friends go bridge-jumping with parachutes to get off on the thrill of excitement. But when Erin protests, Titus realizes that now that he has something to live for, he has second thoughts. Unfortunately, so does Erin.
21	12	"Episode Twenty-Seven"	Joe Regalbuto	Sally Lapiduss	January 30, 2001	2ADK-12	10.90
Ken asks Christopher to be the best man at his wedding to Kathy. When Kathy pushes Christopher too far at the rehearsal dinner, Christopher retaliates – by showing her the video from "What's Up, Hollywood".
22	13	"The Smell of Success"	Jack Kenny	Christopher Titus	February 6, 2001	2ADK-13	10.11
After his antics at a national car show are published in Street Rodder magazine, Christopher finds his shop losing customers and revenue. Things get worse when Ken refuses to help his son and Christopher starts hitting the bottle.
23	14	"Deprogramming Erin"	Gary Shimokawa	Chris Sheridan	February 13, 2001	2ADK-14	10.91
After losing his shop and his girlfriend, Titus quits drinking and decides to win Erin back, but Erin's dysfunctional family (most of which were last seen in "The Perfect Thanksgiving") will not let their daughter go without a fight.
24	15	"NASCAR"	Jeff Melman	Christopher Case	February 20, 2001	2ADK-15	10.33
Erin tricks Christopher into taking his father with him on his trip to North Carolina to deliver a NASCAR stock car.
25	16	"Life Forward"	Robert Berlinger	Jim Hope	February 27, 2001	2ADK-16	9.53
A self-help guru (David Hyde Pierce) gets more than he bargained for when the Titus family arrives at his seminar "Life Forward".
26	17	"Gift of the Car Guy"	Robert Berlinger	Jennifer Fisher	March 13, 2001	2ADK-17	10.28
Christopher sells Erin's car without telling her to buy a drag racing funny car to revive his dead car shop, but soon learns that Erin has been working as a strip club waitress to support herself and Titus following the closing of Titus's business.
27	18	"Tommy's Girlfriend II"	Jeff Melman	Patrick Meighan	March 27, 2001	2ADK-18	10.56
Tiffany, the waitress Christopher slept with in "The Break Up", begins dating Tommy – but Christopher thinks the relationship is just a ruse to get closer to him -- and Tiffany reveals her true intentions after getting paralyzed while having sex with a prep cook.
28	19	"Hard Ass"	Bill Shea	Chris Sheridan	April 10, 2001	2ADK-20	8.94
Erin and Titus argue over how to discipline Amy, Erin's wild, destructive teenage niece who was thrown out after beating Erin's brother with a skateboard and has plans to sell marijuana from the garage.
29	20	"Private Dave"	Gary Shimokawa	Sally Lapiduss	April 17, 2001	2ADK-21	9.61
Titus tries to save his brother from committing suicide (after Dave finds a "Dear John" letter from his girlfriend, Nancy) at the bus station, but Titus discovers something worse: Dave has enlisted in the Army.
30	21	"Three Strikes"	Joe Regalbuto	David L. Moses	April 24, 2001	2ADK-22	8.51
After coming home to find his house burglarized and his girlfriend laid up on the couch with a broken leg, Titus accuses Erin's degenerate brother, Michael (who will be sent to prison for life under California's "three strikes" law) of the crime and has him arrested – only to regret his decision when the actual burglar returns to the scene of the crime.
31	22	"The Pit"	John Amodeo	Robert Hawkins	May 8, 2001	2ADK-23	8.78
Part one of two. To get his shop's reputation back, Christopher begins drag racing to get his name back into the car world. After an argument with his father, Christopher ends up clinging to life when his car crashes. Guest Starring: Jay Leno as himself
32	23	"The Pendulum"	Jack Kenny	Christopher Titus	May 15, 2001	2ADK-24	10.13
Conclusion. With Titus in a coma following his accident from "The Pit", Ken (who is narrating from the Neutral Space) and Erin must decide whether to let Titus come out of the coma or pull the plug. Note: This episode is dedicated to Christopher Titus's father, Ken (of whom Stacey Keach's character on the show is based).
33	24	"The Wedding"	Kevin Rodney Sullivan	John R. Morey	May 22, 2001	2ADK-19	9.20
While at the church to make preparations for their wedding, Christopher and Erin spontaneously decide to marry avoid having to deal with their dysfunctional families. But when Tommy blows their cover, Titus and Erin struggle to go through with the ceremony until Juanita's abusive psychiatrist boyfriend punches her in the face and Titus and Dave tie him down and try to convince Juanita to dump him.

=== Season 3 (2001–02) ===
No. overall	No. in season	Title	Directed by	Written by	Original release date	Prod. code	Viewers (millions)
34	1	"Racing in the Streets"	Brian Hargrove	Chris Sheridan	November 14, 2001	3ADK-01	8.81
To help pay for Erin's grad school tuition, Titus gets involved in illegal street-racing – despite that he has post-traumatic stress disorder from the car crash that nearly killed him.
35	2	"Amy's Birthday"	Gary Shimokawa	John R. Morey	November 21, 2001	3ADK-03	7.30
Erin plans a sixteenth birthday party for her niece Amy, but everything goes downhill when Amy's mother passes out on the cake in a drugged-out stupor, Tommy calls Social Services after seeing Amy's squalid apartment, and Amy's abusive alcoholic stepfather comes home.
36	3	"Tommy's Not Gay"	Gary Shimokawa	Christopher Case	November 28, 2001	3ADK-04	8.46
Tommy severs ties with his father, Perry, after Perry comes out of the closet and Tommy comes to the realization that he has been copying his father's effeminate mannerisms (which, in turn, makes everyone think Tommy is gay). But when Perry is beaten up by Titus's homophobic friends, Tommy must choose whether or not to defend his father.
37	4	"Shannon's Song"	Joe Regalbuto	Sally Lapiduss	December 5, 2001	3ADK-08	6.80
When Titus' half-sister Shannon (Elizabeth Berkley) arrives, he tries to upstage her at every opportunity – until Shannon's husband, Stefan, leaves her after learning that she is pregnant.
38	5	"Grad School"	Gary Shimokawa	Jennifer Fisher	December 12, 2001	3ADK-02	7.21
Erin disdains, then requests, Titus's help when she visits a foster home filled with troubled teens (the leader of which is a surly teenage runaway who was impregnated by her father) for her first grad-school assignment as an interning social worker.
39	6	"Houseboat"	Joe Regalbuto	Jim Hope	December 19, 2001	3ADK-06	7.50
Christmas on a houseboat brings a kinder, gentler Ken when he thinks he killed his best friend Bob (David Carradine) by pushing him overboard in a drunken haze.
40	7	"The Trial"	Jack Kenny	Christopher Titus	January 2, 2002	3ADK-05	8.29
Following the murder at the end of "The Wedding", Juanita (now played by Connie Stevens) stands trial for shooting her abusive husband. Titus tries to save her from serving jail time by defending her in court, but the trial ends in a hostage situation when Juanita reveals that she is sick of Titus defending her and her violent behavior.
41	8	"Grandma Titus"	Brian Hargrove	Shawn Thomas	January 9, 2002	2ADK-25	6.29
Phyllis Diller guest stars as Grandma Titus, who still intimidates Ken – despite showing signs of Alzheimer's disease, which has her trying to teach a high-school class. Note: Though this episode aired in Season 3, it was the last episode produced for Season 2.
42	9	"Errrr"	Jack Kenny	Chris Sheridan	January 16, 2002	3ADK-13	7.81
After rescuing Amy from attempting suicide over being jilted by a lover named "Charlie", Titus tells Amy the story of how he fell in love with Erin and how Titus attempted suicide after Erin rejected him.
43	10	"Tommy's Crush"	Kevin Rodney Sullivan	Patrick Meighan	January 23, 2002	3ADK-09	9.37
Tommy has an affair with a pregnant Shannon, much to Christopher's disgust. However, when Shannon suffers a miscarriage, Tommy showers Shannon with gifts, and Stefan returns to apologize for walking out on Shannon and decides to take her back when she tells him that she lost the baby, which he never wanted in the first place.
44	11	"Into Thin Air"	John Amodeo	Robert Hawkins	January 30, 2002	3ADK-11	8.16
Christopher and Erin are forced to inform Dave that his girlfriend Nancy is cheating on him. When Chris and Dave end up on a 400-foot (120 m) cliff, Christopher refuses to save Dave, arguing that he must become a man by saving himself – and Tommy, who plummets down to join them.
45	12	"Too Damn Good"	Gary Shimokawa	David L. Moses	February 6, 2002	3ADK-16	8.99
A young car executive (played by Malcolm in the Middle's Frankie Muniz) seeks a new design from Titus, who turns to Ken for inspiration when he hits a creative block.
46	13	"Bachelor Party"	Leslie Kolins Small	Jennifer Fisher	February 13, 2002	3ADK-15	7.84
In this episode as told by Erin in Titus's Neutral Space, Titus, Dave, Ken, and Tommy help a single, pregnant woman (Alex Borstein) deliver her baby at a roadside diner.
47	14	"Hot Streak"	Joe Regalbuto	Patrick Meighan & John R. Morey	February 20, 2002	3ADK-14	7.30
To earn his father's love and respect, Christopher takes him to the Bahamas, where Ken spends most of his time at the casino rather than in the tropical paradise. While Ken soon begins to treat Christopher like a buddy, he suffers another heart attack – and Christopher must decide whether to save his father or keep his friend.
48	15	"The Session"	Brian Hargrove	Matt Ember	March 6, 2002	3ADK-10	8.06
As an exercise for her psychology class, Erin takes the Titus family to group therapy, where Titus opens up about his emotional problems and discovers that his breakdown is being studied by Erin's class.
49	16	"Same Courtesy"	Bill Shea	Christopher Case	March 20, 2002	3ADK-12	6.88
Titus plans an elaborate revenge on Erin and his family after being embarrassed during their mock therapy session by pitting family members against each other on Erin's birthday over an heirloom model cannon.
50	17	"After Mrs. Shafter"	Bill Shea	Shawn Thomas	July 29, 2002	3ADK-17	2.65
Titus and Tommy's friendship is put to the ultimate test when Ken begins dating Tommy's mom. Titus assures Tommy that, being Ken, the relationship will not last. But everyone is shocked to learn that Ken considers Tommy's mother to be the true love of his life. The situation grows even more complicated when Tommy's estranged gay father shows up to reconcile his marriage after realizing being an openly gay elderly man is not all that's cracked up to be.
51	18	"The Visit"	Katy Garretson	Christopher Titus	July 29, 2002	3ADK-18	2.86
Titus and Erin's plans to formally adopt Amy are thrown for a loop when Titus' insane mother Juanita unexpectedly shows up at the house seeking Titus' forgiveness -- and things get weirder when a police officer from Missouri calls with news that Juanita committed suicide.
52	19	"Insanity Genetic"	Kevin Rodney Sullivan	Jim Hope	August 5, 2002	3ADK-19	3.34
53	20	"Insanity Genetic"	Gary Shimokawa	Nancy Steen & Matt Ember	August 5, 2002	3ADK-20	3.76
On the airplane home from his mother's funeral, Titus suffers a nervous breakdown after smelling a cooked turkey dinner, remembering his visits to the mental hospital to see his mom, and going laughing mad after reading a magazine article on mental illness being genetic. This, along with several comic misunderstandings, lead to Titus, Dave, Erin, and Ken to be arrested on conspiracy to commit a terrorist act. While being interrogated by the FBI and pleading their innocence, Dave, Erin, and Ken are given an option: either all four of them go to prison or the three are let go and Titus is put in a mental hospital for three months. Note: This episode is the last one produced for FOX. The next episode, "The Protector," was a temporarily banned episode that only aired because the series was being burned off after news hit that FOX had canceled the show.
54	21	"The Protector"	Gary Shimokawa	Nancy Steen	August 12, 2002	3ADK-07	3.07
When Amy gets in trouble for beating up a boy who sexually harassed her by calling her a "slut" and making lewd comments about her butt, Titus takes matters into his own hands – and gets into trouble when the boy's father, Frank, arrives. But when Amy has a panic attack over Frank and tells Erin that Frank molested her as a child while her parents were in jail and rehab, Erin and Titus must find out if Amy is telling the truth or trying to ruin an innocent man's life by making a wild accusation. Note: This was a late entry by FOX (the episode was banned because of its references to child sexual abuse) and was not intended to be the season/series finale.

=== Season 4 (2020) ===
No. overall	No. in season	Title	Directed by	Written by	Original release date	Prod. code
55	1	"Homecoming"	Christopher Titus	Christopher Titus	August 21, 2020	4ADK-01
56	2	"Homecoming"	Christopher Titus	Christopher Titus	August 21, 2020	4ADK-02
Eighteen years ago, Titus ended with Christopher being put away in a mental hospital following his nervous breakdown over his mother's suicide. After being released from his eight-year stay (caused by Dave foolishly trying to spring Titus from the mental hospital), Titus discovers that his life has changed dramatically: his custom cars had to be sold to keep the shop from going under, Dave started his own marijuana dispensary, only to sell the business; Ken has moved to Mexico to party until he dies, and Erin has decided that she's had enough of Titus' dysfunctional life and chooses Tommy over him.
