= List of The Secret World of Alex Mack episodes =

The Secret World of Alex Mack is an American television series that aired on Nickelodeon from October 8, 1994, to January 15, 1998. It also aired on YTV in Canada and NHK in Japan, and was a staple in the children's weekday line-up for much of the mid-to-late 1990s on the Australian Broadcasting Corporation. Repeats of the series aired in 2003 on The N, but it was soon replaced there. The series was produced by Thomas Lynch and John Lynch of Lynch Entertainment, produced by RHI Entertainment, Hallmark Entertainment, and Nickelodeon Productions and was co-created by Tom Lynch and Ken Lipman. During the course of the series, 78 episodes of The Secret World of Alex Mack aired over four seasons.

== Series overview ==
Season	Episodes	Originally released	
Season	Episodes	First released	Last released
1	13	October 8, 1994	February 4, 1995
2	20	October 14, 1995	September 28, 1996
3	25	October 5, 1996	March 4, 1997
4	20	September 23, 1997	January 15, 1998

== Episodes ==
=== Season 1 (1994–95) ===
No. overall	No. in season	Title	Directed by	Written by	Original release date	Prod. code	U.S. households (millions)
1	1	"The Accident"	Peter Lauer	Ken Lipman & Thomas W. Lynch	October 8, 1994	101	N/A
After a disastrous first day of middle school, Alex Mack is accidentally drenched in an experimental chemical, leaving her with unusual powers.
2	2	"Hoop War"	Christopher T. Welch	Thomas W. Lynch	October 15, 1994	103	N/A
After being framed for a cafeteria food fight by Jessica (Jessica Alba) and Ellen, Alex and Ray challenge them to a basketball game to determine who must clean up the mess.
3	3	"Shock Value"	Peter Lauer	Brian Hargrove & Jack Kenny	October 22, 1994	102	N/A
Alex procrastinates on her science project and uses her powers to present it at the last minute, but when she cannot explain the results, she is accused of cheating.
4	4	"The Videotape"	Allison Liddi	Magda Liolis	November 5, 1994	110	N/A
During a field trip to Paradise Valley Chemical Plant, Alex accidentally displays her powers on camera and must retrieve the videotape before Danielle Atron discovers it.
5	5	"School Dance"	Allison Liddi	Ken Lipman	November 12, 1994	106	1.73
Alex hopes to attend the school dance with her crush, Scott, but must compete with Jessica for his attention.
6	6	"Science Fair"	Sean McNamara	Ken Lipman & Thomas W. Lynch	November 19, 1994	107	N/A
Annie’s science project is selected for the plant's annual science fair, but Danielle Atron's nephew Carlton (Jason Marsden) frames Alex for sabotaging it.
7	7	"False Alarms"	Sean McNamara	Neena Beber	December 3, 1994	105	N/A
It's time for midterms at Atron Junior High, and Libby, the most popular kid at school, would rather skip class than study. Looking to escape, Libby pulls the fire alarm and talks to Alex into taking the blame.
8	8	"The Feud"	Christopher T. Welch	Ken Lipman & Sean McNamara	December 10, 1994	109	N/A
When Alex wins a pair of concert tickets on the radio, Ray is disappointed to learn that Alex is taking Nicole to the concert instead of him. Desperate for a ticket of his own, when Ray finds a flyer from the Plant offering a cash reward to whoever reveals the kid in the accident, he tries to make up a story convincing enough for him to get the reward money without revealing to the Plant that the kid is Alex.
9	9	"Alex and Mom"	Paul Hoen	Christine Ecklund & Keith Hoffman	January 7, 1995	108	N/A
Alex "disorganizes" her mother's files after a huge fight, causing Barbara to nearly lose her job at the Plant. A remorseful Alex tries to make amends when Barbara's final chance at saving face seems doomed to disaster.
10	10	"Cold Day in Paradise Valley"	Christopher T. Welch	Christine Ecklund & Keith Hoffman	January 14, 1995	104	N/A
Alex has a cold, and her powers are going berserk as a result. With a reporter (and Plant spy) in the house trying to interview her for a newspaper article, Alex finds herself trapped.
11	11	"Annie Bails"	Ron Oliver	Christine Ecklund & Keith Hoffman	January 21, 1995	112	N/A
As Annie attends a college interview, Alex struggles to manage uncontrollable morphing spasms on her own.
12	12	"The Solo"	Leslie Hill	Jennifer Wharton	January 28, 1995	111	N/A
Ray is chosen to perform at a school recital, but his stage fright threatens the performance.
13	13	"Road Trip"	Thomas W. Lynch	Ken Lipman & Thomas W. Lynch	February 4, 1995	113	N/A
Alex and her father take a road trip to the mountains in an effort to strengthen their relationship.

=== Season 2 (1995–96) ===
No. overall	No. in season	Title	Directed by	Written by	Original release date	Prod. code	U.S. households (millions)
14	1	"The Journal"	Christopher T. Welch	Ken Lipman & Thomas W. Lynch	October 14, 1995	203	N/A
Ever since the accident, Alex has been keeping a journal of everything that's happened to her. When she leaves it in a bag that Annie unknowingly brings to Alex at school, she finds herself in very hot water.
15	2	"Double Bogey"	Paul Tassie	Matt Dearborn	October 14, 1995	205	2.10
Alex and her father enter the Plant's Father-Daughter Golf Tournament.
16	3	"New Kid in Town"	Allison Liddi	Anna MacGregor	October 21, 1995	202	N/A
Ray befriends new student Louis Driscoll, prompting Alex to grow jealous as Ray begins spending more time with him.
17	4	"The Secret"	Paul Tassie	Thomas W. Lynch	October 28, 1995	210	2.13
On Halloween, Alex explores an abandoned house and encounters a mysterious ghost who appears to know details about Danielle Atron.
18	5	"Suspect"	Allison Liddi	Brian Hargrove & Jack Kenny	November 4, 1995	204	N/A
Hoping to earn extra money, Alex agrees to babysit for the snobbish Kelly Phillips.
19	6	"Pressure"	Paul Hoen	Ken Lipman	November 11, 1995	212	2.22
Nicole struggles with an upcoming exam, and Alex attempts to help by obtaining a copy of the test. Meanwhile, George begins discovering the mutagenic properties of GC-161.
20	7	"The Secret World of Ray Alvarado"	Christopher T. Welch	Ken Lipman	November 18, 1995	207	2.49
After a freak accident between them, Alex's powers somehow get transferred into Ray. Unfortunately, Ray doesn't have the same level of self-control as Alex does.
21	8	"Rat Trap"	Linda Shayne	Carolyn Quinn	December 2, 1995	208	2.39
Alex has made it onto the school's track team. Now, everyone in Paradise Valley is looking towards Alex's unique performance... including the ever-suspicious Danielle Atron.
22	9	"Busted"	Christopher T. Welch	Bernie Ancheta	December 9, 1995	201	N/A
After being grounded for staying out late, Alex sneaks out again and finds herself in deeper trouble.
23	10	"The Gift"	Paul Tassie	Ken Lipman & Thomas W. Lynch	December 23, 1995	218	2.75
It's Christmas, and Alex and her father are learning that all the glitz and glamour don't make the holiday. Meanwhile, Dave tries to give Vince a chimpanzee for a gift, but chaos ensues when the ape ingests a vial of GC-161.
24	11	"Ray Goes to Washington"	Christopher T. Welch	Matt Dearborn	December 30, 1995	209	2.17
Ray campaigns for eighth-grade class president and learns firsthand about the brutal world of politics.
25	12	"Trophy Case"	Allison Liddi	Matt Dearborn	January 6, 1996	211	N/A
Jealous of Annie's accomplishments, Alex searches for recognition of her own.
26	13	"On the Rocks"	Jeff Blyth	Mindy Schneider	January 13, 1996	217	2.42
Annie's attempt to impress her love interest, Bryce, while mountain climbing leaves her hanging... literally. Can Alex save her older sister's life when it's hanging by an actual rope?
27	14	"Saturn"	Paul Tassie	Matt Dearborn	July 20, 1996	213	N/A
Alex's attempts to ask Scott to a dance are continuously ruined by her father.
28	15	"Mack TV"	Paul Hoen	Dorie D'Amore	July 27, 1996	214	N/A
Ray's videotape of Alex using her powers is entered into the Atron Junior High Video Awards, where Danielle and Vince serve as judges.
29	16	"The Party"	Jeff Blyth	Danielle Gantner	August 10, 1996	220	N/A
While Alex's parents are away for the weekend, Kelly manipulates her trust to throw a party at the Mack home.
30	17	"Carnival"	Linda Shayne	Anna MacGregor	September 7, 1996	216	1.75
Annie ditches taking Alex to the carnival in favor of Bryce, while Danielle puts up with a former employee-turned-government inspector who is actively trying to shut the Plant down.
31	18	"Local Hero"	Allison Liddi	Joe Purdy & Rick Gitelson	September 14, 1996	215	2.25
Alex, Ray, and Louis manage to save a young child from certain death, but it's Louis who gets all the credit. In response, the Plant has turned their suspicions towards him.
32	19	"World Without Alex"	Paul Tassie	Peter Egan	September 21, 1996	221	2.17
Convinced the world would be better off without her, Alex experiences an alternate reality in which she never existed.
33	20	"Nerve"	Paul Hoen	Peter Egan	September 28, 1996	206	1.96
Faced with Atron Junior High's dreaded "Rooney Runabout", Robyn is convinced that she'll never pass P.E. It's up to Alex to buoy her friend's hopes.

=== Season 3 (1996–97) ===
No. overall	No. in season	Title	Directed by	Written by	Original release date	Prod. code	U.S. households (millions)
34	1	"The Other Side"	Jeff Blyth	Ken Lipman & Thomas W. Lynch	October 5, 1996	224	1.91
35	2	"The Other Side"	Jeff Blyth	Ken Lipman & Thomas W. Lynch	October 8, 1996	225	2.81
In part one, after getting drenched with the Plant's new "GC-Divide" compound, a second Alex forms from the original. This new Alex quickly proves to be a cruel and self-centered brat, leaving the good Alex trapped in a demolition site while she escapes. In part two, Alex finds herself in danger when her evil double starts spreading havoc over Paradise Valley.
36	3	"Working"	Paul Hoen	Mindy Schneider	October 10, 1996	219	2.16
Alex and Robyn get a new job at a local video store, but are unaware that Vince and Dave have rigged it with GC-161 sensors.
37	4	"Operation: Breakout"	Paul Hoen	Burk Sauls	October 15, 1996	222	2.03
Danielle Atron's newest scheme to lure the accident victim out of hiding is to claim that they already have them. Unable to turn her back on the rumor, Alex sneaks into the Plant alone.
38	5	"The Neighbor"	David Straiton	Bernie Ancheta	October 17, 1996	223	2.16
As Paradise Valley lodges complaints about the Plant's reckless pollution, Alex is convinced that her new neighbor is a Plant spy.
39	6	"Images"	Sean McNamara	Ken Lipman & Thomas W. Lynch	October 22, 1996	226	2.02
Alex signs up for the school's yearbook staff as a photographer to get extra credit for English class, and discovers that her crush Scott also works on yearbook.
40	7	"Big Ray"	Paul Hoen	Matt Dearborn	October 24, 1996	303	2.15
Ray has found a new group of friends in a local group of basketballers, and is starting to ignore Alex as a result. Meanwhile, Alex's father must deal with the Plant's newest researcher, Lars Fredrickson.
41	8	"New World Order"	Jeff Blyth	Matt Dearborn	October 29, 1996	302	N/A
Alex discovers an unusual reaction between her mother's curry recipe and her chemically-altered body: temporary bouts of super-strength. She now needs to get her strength in control before Kelly can catch her on film.
42	9	"Bubbling Over"	Paul Hoen	Ken Lipman	November 5, 1996	301	2.05
Just why is Alex coughing up bubbles for no apparent reason? Unfortunately, it doesn't look like Annie is going to find the answer, as she's too upset over her break up with Bryce.
43	10	"Muckraker"	Allison Liddi	Danielle Gantner	November 7, 1996	304	2.38
Alex wants to spice up the school paper, but Louis takes his reporter duties too far. Alex's mother, in the meantime, has re-enrolled in college, and has some conflicts with her professor.
44	11	"Bad Girl"	Lizzie Borden	Ken Lipman	November 12, 1996	305	2.25
Alex befriends the new girl in school, who has her own "unique" style, and one that Alex tries to emulate. Meanwhile, Vince gets fired from the Plant for his consistent screw-ups, and now he's more determined than ever to identify Alex.
45	12	"The Understudy"	Allison Liddi	Neil Landau	November 14, 1996	306	2.22
Ray, with a little help from Louis, manages to impress a new girl, but his superficial charm can't last forever. Annie starts her internship at the Plant.
46	13	"Mystery Man"	Paul Hoen	Story by : John Truby; Teleplay by : Tim Ryan	November 19, 1996	309	N/A
Just who exactly is Paradise Valley's most popular radio DJ? Alex and Ray decide to find out.
47	14	"Chemistry"	Diane Wynter	Julia Poll	November 21, 1996	308	N/A
Alex's habit of literally glowing when under emotional stress is putting her chances with a good-looking boy at school at risk.
48	15	"A Room of Her Own"	Paul Hoen	Kati Rocky	November 26, 1996	307	2.09
Annie takes over her and Alex's shared room to accommodate a lab partner. Seeking her privacy, Alex retaliates by moving to the backyard shed.
49	16	"Spivey"	David Straiton	Matt Dearborn	December 3, 1996	310	2.34
Louis is determined to make his first impression with his old friend Spivey (Josh Server) count. This impression, though, is putting Alex's donut shop job at risk.
50	17	"Woman of the Year"	Jeff Blyth	Vance DeGeneres	December 5, 1996	311	2.06
Paradise Valley's "Woman of the Year" contest is nothing but a nest of corruption, and Alex wants to find out exactly what's going on. However, her attitude takes a sudden turn for the intolerable when she drinks a beverage that Vince had made with a GC-161-reactant chemical.
51	18	"Twelve and a Half"	Paul Hoen	Matt Dearborn	December 10, 1996	312	N/A
Alex puts up with an admirer from the seventh grade, while Vince's attempt to spy on the Macks backfires when he gets stuck in the air vent.
52	19	"The Test"	Allison Liddi	Mindy Schneider	December 26, 1996	313	N/A
Alex has finally reached high school, but the placement tests prove to be too much for her to handle. Determined to pass at any cost, Alex resorts to cheating. Dave, meanwhile, has taken up spy lessons in hopes of finding the accident victim. When he does find her, however, Dave finds himself faced with a crucial moral dilemma.
53	20	"The Creeper"	Matt Dearborn	Matt Dearborn	January 2, 1997	314	N/A
Alex finds herself torn between her old friends and a new friend that's generally unpopular to everyone else.
54	21	"Triangle"	Paul Hoen	Jennifer Wharton	February 18, 1997	315	2.03
Both Alex and Annie have found a new boyfriend. There's just one problem... they're both the same guy!
55	22	"Friends Like That"	Jeff Blyth	Neil Landau	February 20, 1997	316	2.40
Alex has made a new friend named Grace, but she doesn't realize that the "student" is actually another one of the Plant's spies.
56	23	"BMX"	Patrick Williams	Matt Dearborn	February 25, 1997	317	1.92
While out biking, Alex and Ray run into an old hermit in the woods who admits to being the original creator of GC-161. When Lars learns of him, he hires Vince to silence the hermit so as to protect Danielle Atron's interests.
57	24	"Nightmare in Paradise"	Allison Liddi	Magda Liolis	February 27, 1997	318	2.48
Alex's powers and wits are tested when a local school bully begins to pick on her. Meanwhile, Annie's attempt to pass off GC-161-related material to her father puts George under suspicion.
58	25	"Cheers"	Shawn Levy	Story by : Kati Rocky; Teleplay by : Ken Lipman & Matt Dearborn	March 4, 1997	319	1.82
Alex has made it onto the cheerleading team, but she'd rather have her carefree life over the perks of glory. At the Plant, Louis gives Annie a diskette for a new computer game he created, which she unwittingly mistakes for a diskette on her GC-161 research.

=== Season 4 (1997–98) ===
No. overall	No. in season	Title	Directed by	Written by	Original release date	Prod. code	U.S. households (millions)
59	1	"Driving"	Patrick Williams	Danielle Gantner	September 23, 1997	401	2.97
Alex wants to buy her own car, so she takes a job at a distribution company run by Louis' father.
60	2	"Green Day"	Matt Dearborn	Matt Dearborn	September 25, 1997	402	2.42
Alex and Robyn are friends, but Robyn's environmentalist group is putting Alex's doughnut shop job under fire.
61	3	"Camping"	Paul Hoen	Danielle Gantner	September 30, 1997	320	1.92
Alex and her old rival Kelly are stuck as summer camp counselors. When the two girls get in danger, however, they learn that friendship may not be so bad between the two of them.
62	4	"Ashley"	Jeff Blyth	Matt Dearborn	October 2, 1997	321	2.03
When her Aunt Ashley comes to visit, Alex is instantly taken in by her optimistic and fun-loving attitude towards life.
63	5	"Oscar"	Paul Hoen	Ken Lipman	October 7, 1997	322	1.97
Oscar, the GC-161-enhanced chimpanzee, is back, and Alex is struggling to hide him from both Vince and her parents.
64	6	"Foot Fault"	Shawn Levy	Matt Dearborn	October 9, 1997	324	2.14
While searching for UFOs, Louis catches Alex's powers on film, although he doesn't know it. Alex, meanwhile, is trying to get her father to overcome his fear of bowling.
65	7	"The Switch"	Allison Liddi	Neil Landau	October 14, 1997	326	N/A
In a freaky accident, Alex and her mother switch bodies, leaving them both in shock and confusion.
66	8	"The Storm"	Jeff Blyth	Ken Lipman	October 16, 1997	323	2.22
While a storm blows outside, Alex and Annie reminisce on all that has happened since Alex got her powers.
67	9	"Leaving"	Bill Scarlet	Ken Lipman	October 21, 1997	325	2.05
As Annie prepares to leave for college, Alex's recent exploits to get an ailing woman to the hospital raises Danielle's suspicions.
68	10	"Señora Garcia"	Paul Hoen	Danielle Gantner	October 23, 1997	327	2.17
Alex can't help but feel responsible that her tough-as-nails Spanish teacher (Carmen Zapata) got fired, but is she really to blame?
69	11	"The Doctor"	Allison Liddi	Matt Dearborn	October 28, 1997	328	N/A
Alex's doctor check-up is coming, and she's desperate to escape. After all, her altered DNA would be a dead giveaway to the doctor (Todd Waring) that she's not quite average.
70	12	"The Band"	Jeff Blyth	Kati Rocky	November 4, 1997	329	N/A
Alex, Ray, and Louis decide to form a band, but realize that the life of a rocker isn't as easy as one would think.
71	13	"Things Change"	Shawn Levy	Ken Lipman	November 6, 1997	330	N/A
Ray has a new girlfriend, but he hasn't told Alex about it. When Alex does find out, however, her jealousy over her best friend reveals itself.
72	14	"The Return"	Paul Hoen	Ken Lipman	November 18, 1997	403	N/A
A new kid named Hunter (Will Estes) has come to town, and Alex manages to befriend him. However, he seems to be curious about the connection between Danielle Atron and GC-161.
73	15	"Friendly Fire"	Paul Hoen	Kati Rocky	November 20, 1997	404	N/A
While her parents are away, Robyn moves in with Alex, but it doesn't exactly turn out like she thought it would. Meanwhile, George tries to find out why Dave is leaving him envelopes filled with classified information on GC-161 that he's not supposed to know about.
74	16	"Lies and Secrets"	Shawn Levy	Danielle Gantner & Ken Lipman	November 25, 1997	405	N/A
Having heard of the accident, Hunter has now focused on finding the accident victim, in hopes that he can get one step closer to his agenda. What can Alex do?
75	17	"Without Feathers"	Matt Dearborn	Matt Dearborn	December 2, 1997	406	N/A
Alex plays matchmaker for Louis and sets up a date between him and Hannah Mercury, with Alex and Hunter tagging along. Ray, on the other hand, is occupied with his new job at a fancy restaurant.
76	18	"24 Hours"	Allison Liddi	Matt Dearborn	December 4, 1997	409	2.26
Just exactly why is all of Paradise Valley acting strangely around Alex? Did someone rat her out to the Plant, or is there something else involved? This happens to be that the town people are playing a prank on Alex, but she thinks that everything in the prank is real.
77	19	"Paradise Lost"	Paul Hoen	Story by : Ken Lipman & Thomas W. Lynch; Teleplay by : Ken Lipman	January 13, 1998	407	N/A
78	20	"Paradise Regained"	Paul Hoen	Story by : Ken Lipman & Thomas W. Lynch; Teleplay by : Ken Lipman	January 15, 1998	408	N/A
Part 1: Danielle Atron is just moments away from releasing her GC-161-enhanced weight-loss drinks to the public. Meanwhile, Louis finds out about Alex, and while he pledges to keep the secret, he isn't as careful as the others, leading to Danielle finding out about Alex, who is subsequently kidnapped and brought to the Plant. Part 2: After being kidnapped, Alex finds herself trapped inside the Plant. Her parents are also brought in, and Alex reveals her powers to them. Meanwhile, Danielle plots to blow up the Plant with Alex and her parents inside to eliminate any evidence linking her to GC-161. With the help of Ray and Hunter, Alex and her parents are rescued before the Plant blows up and Danielle is arrested. Alex comes across Dave, who had alerted the FDA about GC-161, and thanks him for not telling Danielle about her even though he knew. Later, George gives Alex an antidote for GC-161, which he has secretly been developing, but it is left ambiguous whether or not she takes it.
