= Kingdom Come (2001 film) =

2001 film by Doug McHenry

- Theatrical release poster
- Directed by: Doug McHenry
- Written by: David Dean Bottrell; Jessie Jones
- Produced by: Edward Bates; John Morrissey
- Starring: LL Cool J Jada Pinkett Smith; Vivica A. Fox; Loretta Devine; Anthony Anderson; Whoopi Goldberg; Toni Braxton; Darius McCrary
- Cinematography: Francis Kenny
- Edited by: Richard Halsey
- Music by: Tyler Bates; John E. Rhone
- Distributed by: Fox Searchlight Pictures
- Release date: April 11, 2001
- Running time: 105 minutes
- Country: United States
- Language: English
- Budget: $7 million
- Box office: $23.4 million

Kingdom Come is a 2001 American comedy-drama film, written by David Dean Bottrell and Jessie Jones, and directed by Doug McHenry. This film stars LL Cool J, Jada Pinkett Smith, Vivica A. Fox, Anthony Anderson, Toni Braxton, Whoopi Goldberg, Loretta Devine, and Darius McCrary.

== Plot ==
Kingdom Come is a story of a family called the Slocumbs, living out in the country, who must come together after the death of a family member, whom no one seems to remember with much fondness. It is based on the Off-Broadway play Dearly Departed.

First, there's Woodrow "Bud" Slocumb, the man in question, whose wife, Raynelle (Whoopi Goldberg), is pretty nonchalant about his death from a stroke. Then, there's Ray Bud (LL Cool J), a recovering alcoholic who has a problem with seeing his father dead because of their rocky relationship; his wife, Lucille (Vivica A. Fox), is a loving, devoted housewife who goes out of her way to make sure that everyone has everything they need, but can't have the one thing she wants out of life: a child. Next, Junior (Anthony Anderson) has blown all of his money on a failed invention, and his loud mouthed wife, Charisse (Jada Pinkett Smith), is no help; she hits the roof after his infidelity and reminds him often that she could have been married to his rich lawyer cousin, who, it is later revealed, left his own wife Juanita (Toni Braxton). Then, there's Marguerite (Loretta Devine), a pious, overbearing mother who usually calls her wayward son, Royce (Darius McCrary), a "Demon Seed"; she fears that he will end up in jail like his brother, and the latter is an unemployed worker who is irritated by his mother's unsolicited and shrill advice on how to live his life.

== Cast ==
- LL Cool J as Raymond "Ray" Bud Slocumb
- Jada Pinkett Smith as Charisse Slocumb
- Vivica A. Fox as Lucille Slocumb
- Loretta Devine as Marguerite Slocumb
- Anthony Anderson as Junior Slocumb
- Toni Braxton as Juanita Slocumb
- Cedric the Entertainer as Rev. Beverly H. Hooker
- Darius McCrary as Royce Slocumb
- Whoopi Goldberg as Raynelle Slocumb
- Richard Gant as Clyde Kincaid
- Kellita Smith as Bernice Talbot
- Clifton Davis as Charles Winslow
- Dominic Hoffman as Antoine Depew
- Ellis E. Williams as Woodrow "Bud" Slocumb (uncredited)

== Production ==
Filming took place in summer of 2000 in Ferndale, California.

== Reception ==
On the review aggregator website Rotten Tomatoes, 26% of 65 critics' reviews are positive. The website's consensus reads: "While it has its moments, Kingdom Come is marred by a script that's low on laughs and uneven in tone." Metacritic, which uses a weighted average, assigned the film a score of 48 out of 100, based on 26 critics, indicating "mixed or average" reviews.

== Awards and nominations ==
- In 2002, received an NAACP Image Award nomination for "Outstanding Actress" for Whoopi Goldberg; "Outstanding Supporting Actor" for Cedric the Entertainer; "Outstanding Supporting Actress" for Loretta Devine; and "Outstanding Supporting Actress" for Vivica A. Fox.

== Soundtrack ==
- "Kingdom Come" - Written by Kirk Franklin
  Performed by Kirk Franklin and Jill Scott
  Produced by Kirk Franklin for Fo Yo Soul Productions/B-Rite Music
  Kirk Franklin appears courtesy of GospoCentric Records
  Jill Scott appears courtesy of Hidden Beach Recordings
- "It's Alright" - Written by Kirk Franklin
  Performed by Trin-i-tee 5:7
  Produced by Kirk Franklin for Fo Yo Soul Productions/B-Rite Music
  Trin-i-tee 5:7 appears courtesy of B-Rite Music
- "Someday" - Written by Kirk Franklin
  Performed by Crystal Lewis
  Produced by Kirk Franklin for Fo Yo Soul Productions/B-Rite Music
  Crystal Lewis appears courtesy of Metro One Records
- "Every Woman" - Written by Kirk Franklin
  Performed by Az Yet
  Produced by Kirk Franklin for Fo Yo Soul Productions/B-Rite Music
- "Stand" - Written by Kirk Franklin
  Performed by Shawn Stockman
  Produced by Kirk Franklin for Fo Yo Soul Productions/B-Rite Music
  Shawn Stockman appears courtesy of Universal Records
- "God's Got It All In Control" - Written by Kurt Carr
  Performed by Kurt Carr and friends featuring Tamela Mann from The Family
  Produced by Kurt Carr for Kurt Carr Productions/GospoCentric Records
  Kurt Carr, Yvette Williams and Tamela Mann appear courtesy of GospoCentric Records
- "Thy Will Be Done" - Written by Kirk Franklin
  Performed by Deborah Cox
  Produced by Kirk Franklin for Fo Yo Soul Productions/B-Rite Music
  Deborah Cox appears courtesy of J Records LLC
- "Daddy's Song" - Written by Kirk Franklin
  Performed by Carl Thomas, Natalie Wilson and SOP
  Produced by Kirk Franklin for Fo Yo Soul Productions/B-Rite Music
  Carl Thomas appears courtesy of Bad Boy Records
  Natalie Wilson and SOP appear courtesy of GospoCentric Records
- "Try Me" (Reprise) - Written by Kirk Franklin
  Performed by the cast with Ashley Guilbert, Shanika Leeks and Caltomeesh West
- "Try Me" - Written by Kirk Franklin
  Performed by Tamar Braxton and One Nation Crew
  Produced by Kirk Franklin for Fo Yo Soul Productions/B-Rite Music
  Tamar Braxton appears courtesy of DreamWorks Records
  One Nation Crew appears courtesy of B-Rite Music
- "Thank You" - Written by Kirk Franklin
  Performed by Kirk Franklin and Mary Mary
  Produced by Kirk Franklin for Fo Yo Soul Productions/B-Rite Music
  Mary Mary appears courtesy of Columbia Records
  Kirk Franklin appears courtesy of GospoCentric Records
