= Kleptomania (disambiguation) =

Kleptomania is the inability to refrain from the urge for stealing.

Kleptomania or Klepto may also refer to:

- Kleptomania (album), a 2004 album by Mansun
- Kleptomania (band), a 1970s Belgian rock band that included Dany Lademacher
- Kleptomania, a boutique at Carnaby Street, London in the 1960s
- Klepto (film), a 2003 film
- Klepto (EP), a 1999 EP by Slaves on Dope
- "Kleptomaniac", an episode of Strange Experiences
