= David Dean Bottrell =

American actor, comedian and screenwriter

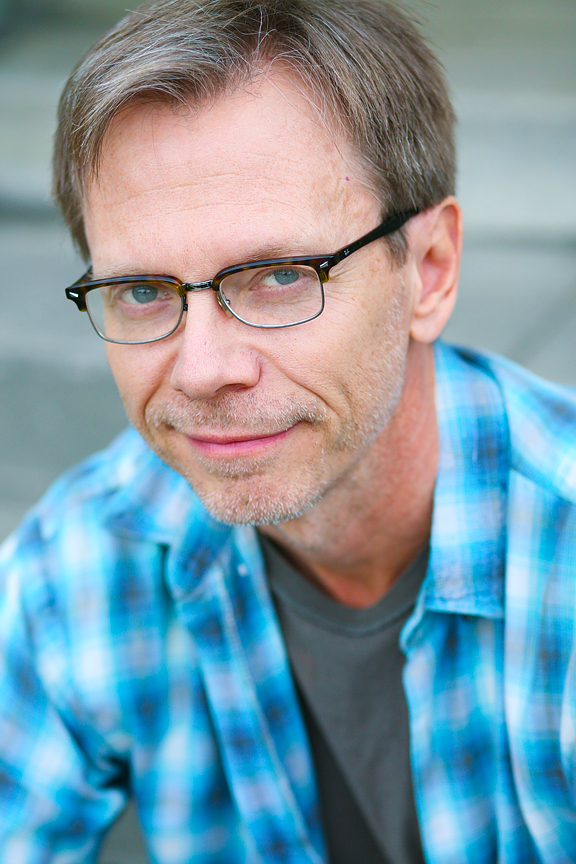
- David Dean Bottrell in 2012
- Born: 6 April 1959 (age 67); Louisa, Kentucky
- Occupations: Actor, comedian, screenwriter
- Years active: 1983–present

David Dean Bottrell (born April 6, 1959) is an American actor, comedian and screenwriter best known for playing on numerous TV series & as Lincoln Meyer on 8 episodes of the ABC television series Boston Legal. He is also the author of "Working Actor: Breaking In, Making a Living and Making a Life in the Fabulous Trenches of Show Business" published by Ten Speed Press, a division of Random House.

He started his career in New York, working at such theatres as the Second Stage, the Public Theater, the Manhattan Punch Line and regionally at the Long Wharf Theatre and the Actors Theatre of Louisville. His television work includes guest starring roles on And the Band Played On, Head of the Class, JAG, Caroline in the City, Mad About You, Dharma & Greg, Days of Our Lives, Ugly Betty, Criminal Minds, iCarly, Castle, Bones, Harry's Law, NCIS, Justified, Mad Men, Longmire, Modern Family, Law & Order: SVU, Rectify and The Blacklist.

He also co-wrote (with Jessie Jones) the off-Broadway play Dearly Departed, which he and Jones later adapted into a film version titled Kingdom Come, starring Whoopi Goldberg, LL Cool J and Jada Pinkett Smith, produced by Fox Searchlight Pictures.

Bottrell has written about his experiences in the entertainment industry for the Huffington Post, Backstage, Salon.com and MetroSource magazine. On stage, he was one of the original cast members of both the Los Angeles and New York companies of the long-running comedy revue, Streep Tease: An Evening of Meryl Streep Monologues performed by an All-Male Company in which he performed a 6-minute rendition of the entire plot of Out of Africa.

In the summer of 2011, Bottrell (who is openly gay) performed his comedic one-man show, David Dean Bottrell Makes Love: A One-Man Show at the Rogue Machine Theatre in Los Angeles. In 2019, Bottrell brought a heavily revised version of the show to New York's Dixon Place and, in January 2020, Penguin Random House Audio recorded a live version of the show, releasing it as an audiobook on 11 Feb. 2020.

Bottrell has taught acting at UCLA and The American Academy of Dramatic Arts (both the New York and Los Angeles campuses). He is also one of the producers of Sci-Fest, the first annual Los Angeles Science Fiction One-Act Play Festival, held annually in May.

== Filmography ==
=== Films ===
Film
Year	Title	Role	Notes
2010	For Christ's Sake	Sam	
2010	Bad Kitty	Man	(Short)
2012	The Strangely Normal	Prissy Dad	(Short)
2014	Fist	Dr. Avery	(Short)
2016	So B. It	Dietz	
2017	The Lady Killers	Paul's Client	
(post-production)	Christmas Eve Eve Or: the Things I Can't Remember	Phil	(Short)

=== TV ===
Television
Year	Title	Role	Notes
1990	Head of the Class	Chip (credited as David Bottrell)	(TV Series), 1 episode: "The Reel Charlie Moore"
1993	And the Band Played On	Man #3	(TV Movie)
1995	JAG	McKissick	(TV Series), 1 episode: "Brig Break"
1996	Shadow (TV Series)	(credited as David Dean)	(TV Series), 1 episode
1996	Space: Above and Beyond	Monitor #2 (credited as David Botrell)	(TV Series), 1 episode: "Who Monitors the Birds?"
1997	Caroline in the City	Customer #2 (credited as David Bottrell)	(TV Series), 1 episode: "Caroline and the Novelist"
1998	Mad About You	Animal Handler	(TV Series), 1 episode: "There's a Puma in the Kitchen"
1998	Dharma & Greg	Patron (credited as David Botrell)	(TV Series), 1 episode: "Old Yeller"
2000	Titus	Bobby (credited as David Bottrell)	(TV Series), 1 episode: "Sex with Pudding"
2006	Boston Legal	Lincoln Meyer	(TV Series), 8 episodes
2007	Women's Murder Club	Oliver Duprix	(TV Series), 1 episode: "To Drag & to Hold"
2007	Ugly Betty	Lawyer	(TV Series), 1 episode: "Family/Affair"
2009	Criminal Minds	Chad Brown	(TV Series), 1 episode: "Amplification"
2010	iCarly	Bob	(TV Series), 1 episode: "iGot a Hot Room"
2010	Castle	Byron H. Singer	(TV Series), 1 episode: "Murder Most Fowl"
2011	Away		(TV Movie)
2011	Harry's Law	Pastor Darcy	(TV Series), 1 episode: "Bad to Worse"
2011	Days of Our Lives	Al	(TV Series), 1 episode: "6 episodes"
2012	The Watcher	Dr. Kramon	(TV Series), 1 episode: "The Good Doctor"
2012	NCIS	Assistant Director of Operations Donald Linder	(TV Series), 1 episode: "You Better Watch Out"
2012	Holly's Holiday	Maitre D'	(TV Movie)
2012	True Blood	Professor Kannell	(TV Series), 1 episode: "Gone, Gone, Gone"
2013	Mad Men	Preacher	(TV Series), 1 episode: "In Care Of"
2013	Save Me	Brian	(TV Series), 1 episode: "Whatever the Weather"
2013	Justified	Alvin	(TV Series), 1 episode: "This Bird Has Flown"
2014	Hairapy	Kevin Q	(TV Series), 4 episodes
2014	CSI: Crime Scene Investigation	Bruce Grady	(TV Series), 1 episode: "Let's Make a Deal"
2014	Bones	Tripp Warshaw	(TV Series), 1 episode: "The Cold in the Case"
2014	American Koko	Sparrow	(TV Series), 1 episode: "Don't Black Girls Go to Baptist Church Anymore"
2015	Law & Order: Special Victims Unit	Stan	(TV Series), 1 episode: "Melancholy Pursuit"
2015	Longmire	Jerry Napek	(TV Series), 1 episode: "Highway Robbery"
2015	Mandie and Earring	Party Dad	(TV Series), 1 episode
2015	Dig	John Donaldson	(TV Series), 1 episode: "Trust No One"
2016	Rectify	Daniel's Therapist	(TV Series), 2 episodes: "Happy Unburdening" and "All I'm Sayin'"
2016	Mistresses	Father O'Brian	(TV Series), 1 episode: "The Show Must Go On"
2016	Modern Family	Mr. Wilkerson	(TV Series), 1 episode: "Thunk in the Trunk"
2017	The Blacklist	Conductor	(TV Series), 1 episode: "Dr. Bogdan Krilov (No. 29) "
2018-2019	After Forever (TV Series)	Paul #2	(TV Series), 13 episodes
2026	Widow's Bay	Pastor Collins	(TV Series), 1 episode: "Our History"
