= Sci-Fest LA =

Sci-Fest LA (The Los Angeles Science Fiction One-Act Play Festival) is an annual festival featuring one-act plays in the science fiction genre, held in Los Angeles. It was co-founded by veteran Los Angeles theatre producers Michael Blaha and Lee Costello and actor David Dean Bottrell (“Boston Legal”), and was first held at the ACME Comedy Theatre in Los Angeles on May 6, 2014.

The annual 4-week festival features two rotating evenings of new, 15-25 minute science fiction stage plays.

2014: The inaugural festival took place from May 6th - June 1st with a line-up that included 7 new Science Fiction one-act plays plus a world premiere adaptation of sci-fi legend Ursula Le Guin’s “The Wife’s Story” and an innovative revival of Ray Bradbury’s “Kaleidoscope.” In addition, Sci-Fest LA presented 5 late-night comedy shows with Sci-Fi themed improv groups and short comedy sketches. The 9 one-act plays produced by the festival featured many well-known actors from iconic Sci-Fi franchises including Nelson Ascencio (“The Hunger Games”), David Blue (actor) ("Stargate: Universe"), David Dean Bottrell ("True Blood"), L. Scott Caldwell (“Lost”), Dean Haglund ("The X-Files"), James Kyson (“Heroes”), David H. Lawrence XVII (“Heroes”), Madison McLaughlin (“Supernatural”), Julie McNiven (“Stargate: Universe” & “Supernatural”), Jasika Nicole (“Fringe”), Tim Russ (“Star Trek: Voyager), Armin Shimerman (“Star Trek: Deep Space Nine” & “Buffy the Vampire Slayer”) and Patricia Tallman (“Babylon 5”). The festival also included pre-recorded appearance by Adrienne Wilkinson (“Xena: Warrior Princess”) and Pauley Perrette ("NCIS"). Directors included Dan Castellaneta (“The Simpsons”), Philippe Mora (“Communion”) and Jack Kenny (“Warehouse 13” and "Falling Skies")

2015: On January 17, the festival produced a one-night only fundraising performance of Orson Welles' radio version of H.G. Wells' "The War of the Worlds" featuring actors from all five television versions of "Star Trek" including Walter Koenig (“Lt. Chekhov” on the original “Star Trek”), René Auberjonois (“Star Trek: Deep Space Nine”), Tim Russ ("Star Trek: Voyager"), Linda Park ("Star Trek: Enterprise") and Will Wheaton and Michael Dorn (“Star Trek: The Next Generation”). The second annual Sci-Fest LA Festival took place from May 7th - May 31st and included 8 new Science Fiction one-act plays plus two new adaptations of Neil Gaiman's "The Case of Four and Twenty Blackbirds" and Clive Barker's "The Departed." Cast members included: David Dean Bottrell (“True Blood”), Veronica Cartwright (“Alien”), Nazneen Contractor (“Star Trek: Into Darkness”), Dale Dickey (“True Blood”), Cullen Douglas (“Agents of Shield”), Tina Huang (“Rizzoli and Isles”), Eddie McClintock (“Warehouse 13”), Alan Polonsky (“Aliens”), Mark Povinelli (“Boardwalk Empire”), Marque Richardson (“True Blood”), Tim Russ (“Star Trek: Voyager”), Jeryl Prescott Sales (“The Walking Dead”), Tucker Smallwood (“Star Trek: Enterprise”), Bobby Ray Shafer (“The Office”), Armin Shimerman ("Star Trek: Deep Space Nine”) and Patricia Tallman (“Babylon 5”). The Festival also initiated two new Science Fiction short story competitions: THE TOMORROW PRIZE for Los Angeles-area high-school students, and THE ROSWELL AWARD for adult writers. The winner of The Tomorrow Prize was Ashley Anderson whose short story, "Freedom", was read by Anna Maria Horsford ("Amen"). The winner of the Roswell Award was "Grandma's Sex Machine" written by William Hawkins and read by Gates McFadden (“Star Trek: The Next Generation”). Comic book legend Stan Lee pre-recorded a video welcome to the festival.
