= Maggie (1998 TV series) =

- Genre: Comedy
- Created by: Dan O'Shannon
- Directed by: Pamela Fryman
- Starring: Ann Cusack; John Getz; Morgan Nagler; John Slattery
- Composers: Starr Parodi; Jeff Eden Flair
- Country of origin: United States
- Original language: English
- No. of seasons: 1
- No. of episodes: 22

Production
- Executive producer: Dan O'Shannon
- Producer: David Menteer
- Camera setup: Multi-camera
- Running time: 30 minutes
- Production companies: Atomic Television; Paramount Network Television

Original release
- Network: Lifetime
- Release: August 18, 1998 – March 13, 1999

Maggie is an American comedy television series starring Ann Cusack. The series premiered August 18, 1998, on Lifetime Television, running for one season and airing its final episode on March 13, 1999.

== Premise ==
Maggie Day and Dr. Arthur Day have been married for 19 years, and together they have a 17-year-old daughter, Amanda. Amanda's friend Reg is a budding cartoonist. After Maggie gets a job at an animal clinic and develops a crush on the veterinarian, Richard, she starts seeing a therapist, Kimberly.

== Cast ==
=== Main ===
- Ann Cusack as Maggie Day
- John Getz as Dr. Arthur Day
- Melissa Samuels as Amy Sherwood
- Morgan Nagler as Amanda Day
- John Slattery as Richard

=== Recurring ===
- Todd Giebenhain as Reg
- Francesca P. Roberts as Kimberly

== Production ==
The working title for the series was Maggie Day. In November 1998, series creator, writer and executive producer Dan O'Shannon left the series with the episode "Love the One You're Not With", due to creative differences with Lifetime Television.

== Episodes ==
No.	Title	Directed by	Written by	Original release date
1	"Pilot"	Pamela Fryman	Dan O'Shannon	August 18, 1998
2	"The Other Woman"	Michael Zinberg	Daphne Pollon	August 25, 1998
3	"Maggie's First Save"	Michael Zinberg	Amy DeBartolomeis & David Warick	September 1, 1998
4	"Liar Liar"	Michael Zinberg	Mike Teverbaugh & Linda Teverbaugh	September 8, 1998
5	"If You Can See What I Hear"	Joe Regalbuto	Dan O'Shannon	September 15, 1998
6	"Cats"	Sheldon Epps	Story by : Mike Teverbaugh; Teleplay by : Dan O'Shannon & Daphne Pollon	September 29, 1998
7	"The Maris Syndrome"	Sheldon Epps	Andy Guerdat	October 6, 1998
8	"A Two Story House"	Joe Regalbuto	Dan O'Shannon	October 13, 1998
9	"Ka-Boom"	Joe Regalbuto	Aron Abrams & Gregory Thompson	October 20, 1998
10	"The Greatest Story Ever Told"	Joe Regalbuto	Bill Barol	October 27, 1998
11	"The Ballad of Maggie Day"	Max Tash	Aron Abrams & Gregory Thompson	November 3, 1998
12	"Black and White"	Max Tash	Aron Abrams & Gregory Thompson	December 1, 1998
13	"Just Shoot Him"	Art Dielhenn	Norma Safford Vela	December 8, 1998
14	"Every Little Star"	Joe Regalbuto	Aron Abrams & Gregory Thompson	December 15, 1998
15	"Love the One You're Not With"	Joe Regalbuto	Dan O'Shannon	January 9, 1999
16	"Art History"	Unknown	Unknown	January 16, 1999
17	"Maggie Outs Art"	Unknown	Unknown	January 23, 1999
18	"Remains of the Days"	Matthew Diamond	Brian Hargrove & Jack Kenny	January 30, 1999
19	"The Dawn of a New Maggie Day"	Unknown	Unknown	February 13, 1999
20	"This Is Just a Test"	Unknown	Unknown	February 20, 1999
21	"Don't Quit Your Day Job"	Unknown	Unknown	March 6, 1999
22	"Uh-Oh Baby"	Max Tash	Jana Hunter & Mitch Hunter	March 13, 1999
