= Al Israel =

American actor (1935–2011)

- Born: Alexander Joseph Israel, Jr. April 16, 1935; New York City, U.S.
- Died: March 16, 2011 (aged 75); West Covina, California, U.S.
- Occupation: Actor

Alexander Joseph Israel, Jr. (April 16, 1935 – March 16, 2011) was an American film and television actor.

== Life and career ==
Israel was born April 16, 1935, in Manhattan, New York City.

He is best known for his role as the chainsaw-wielding Colombian drug dealer "Hector the Toad" in the 1983 film Scarface. He also appeared alongside Al Pacino in Carlito's Way a decade later. He was also one of three original cast members to voice the 2006 video game based on the film. The game entitled Scarface: The World Is Yours sold more than two million units in less than two years.

Israel died on March 16, 2011, in West Covina, California. He was 75 years old.

== Filmography ==
=== Film ===
Year	Title	Role	Notes
1982	The Soldier	Keene / Gunman #1	
1983	Scarface	Hector "The Toad"	
1984	Old Enough	Bodega Owner	
1984	Body Double	Corso, The Director	
1990	Marked for Death	Tito Barco	
1993	Carlito's Way	Rolando Ruiz	
1994	Confessions of a Hitman	Frank	
1994	Drop Zone	Schuster Stephens	
1995	Dangerous Minds	Mr. Santiego	
1996	Driven	Juanita	
1998	Luz de la mission		
1998	Broken Vessels	Detective McMahon	
2000	Attention Shoppers	Carlos	
2002	God Squad!	Adrian	
2003	Klepto	Watch Salesman	
2004	Killer Snake	Parking Attendant	
2004	Three Way	The Cashier	

=== Television ===
Year	Title	Role	Notes
1985	Miami Vice	Guzman	Episode: "Evan"
2007	The Shield	Old School Salvadoran Gangster	Episode: Baptism by Fire

=== Video game ===
Year	Title	Role	Notes
2006	Scarface: The World is Yours	Hector "The Toad"	
