= Brian Hargrove =

American television writer & producer (born 1956)

- Born: David Brian Hargrove; April 2, 1956 (age 70); Tarboro, North Carolina, U.S.
- Education: University of North Carolina, Chapel Hill (BFA); Juilliard School (GrDip)
- Occupations: Television writer, producer
- Years active: 1994–present
- Spouse: David Hyde Pierce (m. 2008)

David Brian Hargrove (born April 2, 1956) is an American television writer and producer. He was a co-creator of the television series Titus (2000–2002) along with Christopher Titus and Jack Kenny.

== Early life and education ==
Born David Brian Hargrove in Tarboro, North Carolina, he earned his BFA degree from the University of North Carolina at Chapel Hill. He then studied acting at New York City's Juilliard School as a member of the drama division's Group 10 (1977–1981).

== Career ==
Hargrove is the creator and producer of many television shows, including Titus, Wanda at Large, and Nora. He also has written for several television series, including Dave's World, Caroline in the City, Holding the Baby, and Maggie.

Hargrove wrote the book and lyrics for the musical It Shoulda Been You, which opened on Broadway in March 2015 (previews). It is directed by David Hyde Pierce.

== Personal life ==
Hargrove married his long-time partner, actor and comedian David Hyde Pierce, on October 24, 2008. They have been together since the early 1980s.

== Television credits ==
- The Secret World of Alex Mack (1994–1995: writer)
- Dave's World (1994–1996: story editor, writer, actor)
- Caroline in the City (1996–1998: producer, writer, actor)
- Maggie (1998: supervising producer)
- Holding the Baby (1998: supervising producer, writer)
- Titus (2000–2002: co-creator, composer, executive producer, director, actor)
- Wanda at Large (2003: executive producer, writer)
