= Dave's World =

American sitcom (1993–1997)

- Dave's World intertitle
- Genre: Sitcom
- Created by: Fred Barron
- Based on: Dave Barry's Greatest Hits and Dave Barry Turns 40 by Dave Barry
- Starring: Harry Anderson; DeLane Matthews; Zane Carney; Andrew Ducote; Shadoe Stevens; Meshach Taylor; J.C. Wendel
- Opening theme: "You May Be Right" by Southside Johnny
- Country of origin: United States
- Original language: English
- No. of seasons: 4
- No. of episodes: 98

Production
- Executive producers: Jonathan Axelrod; James Widdoes; Fred Barron
- Producer: Faye Oshima Belyeu
- Running time: 30 minutes
- Production companies: The Producers Entertainment Group Ltd. Krost/Chapin Productions; Axelrod-Widdoes Productions; Fred Barron Productions; Livestock Productions; Kitten in the Oven Productions; CBS Entertainment Productions; CBS Productions

Original release
- Network: CBS
- Release: September 20, 1993 – June 27, 1997

Dave's World is an American sitcom television series, created by Fred Barron, that aired on CBS from September 20, 1993, to June 27, 1997. The series is based on the writing of Miami Herald columnist Dave Barry.

== Plot ==
The show focuses on the daily trials and tribulations of columnist Dave Barry (Harry Anderson) and his wife, Beth (DeLane Matthews), along with their sons, Tommy (Zane Carney) and Willie (Andrew Ducote). Dave worked at the Miami Record-Dispatch (a fictionalized version of the Miami Herald, where Barry worked in real life), where Kenny Beckett (Shadoe Stevens) was his editor, although Dave typically worked from home, where Mia (J.C. Wendel) was his assistant. Neighbor Sheldon Baylor (Meshach Taylor) was a successful plastic surgeon and Dave's best friend from high school. Starting in the second season, the Barrys hired Eric (Patrick Warburton) to do some work on their house, which led to Eric and Mia dating and eventually moving next door to the Barrys and getting married. Later in the series, Dave completes a book based on his and his friends' lives during the 1960s, and Shel loses all of his money when his business manager runs off. Kenny is also fired from the newspaper and becomes a weatherman.

== Setting and background ==
The show was set in Miami, Florida (Barry's actual city of residence), and was based on Barry's books Dave Barry's Greatest Hits and Dave Barry Turns 40.

The show's theme song was a version of Billy Joel's "You May Be Right" sung by Southside Johnny; however, it is not used in the DVD releases (see below).

During the run of the show, the real Dave Barry divorced his wife, Beth.

== Cast ==
=== Main ===
- Harry Anderson as Dave Barry
- DeLane Matthews as Beth Barry
- Shadoe Stevens as Kenny Beckett
- J.C. Wendel as Mia
- Zane Carney as Tommy Barry
- Andrew Ducote as Willie Barry
- Meshach Taylor as Dr. Sheldon "Shel" Baylor
- Patrick Warburton as Eric (seasons 3–4)

=== Recurring ===
- Tammy Lauren as Julie (season 1)
- Eugene Roche as Eric, Jr. (season 3)
- Bea Arthur as Mel Bloom (season 4)

== Episodes ==
=== Series overview ===
Season	Episodes	Originally released	
Season	Episodes	First released	Last released
1	23	September 20, 1993	May 2, 1994
2	25	September 12, 1994	May 22, 1995
3	26	September 13, 1995	May 20, 1996
4	24	September 13, 1996	June 27, 1997

=== Season 1 (1993–94) ===
No. overall	No. in season	Title	Directed by	Written by	Original release date	Prod. code	Viewers (millions)
1	1	"Pilot"	James Widdoes	Fred Barron	September 20, 1993	3004	21.7
2	2	"The Insecurity System"	James Widdoes	Fred Barron and Marco Pannette	September 27, 1993	106	22.8
3	3	"Martian Death Flu"	James Widdoes	Donald Todd	October 4, 1993	102	20.4
4	4	"The Anniversary Schmaltz"	James Widdoes	Marco Pannette	October 11, 1993	103	21.9
5	5	"The Great Mandala of Life"	James Widdoes	Fred Barron	October 18, 1993	101	19.2
6	6	"I Sort of Saw What You Did"	James Widdoes	Jennifer Heath	October 22, 1993	104	11.7
7	7	"It's a Small Van After All"	James Widdoes	Jennifer Heath	October 25, 1993	107	20.8
8	8	"Heatwave"	James Widdoes	Donald Todd	November 1, 1993	105	20.6
9	9	"Writer's Block"	James Widdoes	Stuart Silverman	November 8, 1993	108	19.9
10	10	"Educating Rita"	James Widdoes	Fred Barron and Marco Pennette	November 15, 1993	110	21.6
11	11	"Death and Mom Take a Holiday"	Unknown	Unknown	November 22, 1993	109	19.8
12	12	"Exorcising with Dave Barry"	James Widdoes	Donald Todd	November 29, 1993	111	20.6
13	13	"I Saw Mommy Kissing Santa Claus: Part 1"	James Widdoes	Marco Pennette	December 13, 1993	113	18.7
14	14	"I Saw Mommy Kicking Santa Claus: Part 2"	Unknown	Unknown	December 20, 1993	114	19.3
15	15	"Just Kidding"	Unknown	Unknown	January 3, 1994	112	21.5
16	16	"The Road Taken"	Unknown	Unknown	January 10, 1994	115	21.9
17	17	"Shel in Love"	Unknown	Unknown	January 24, 1994	117	22.6
18	18	"Four Characters in Search of a Ring"	Unknown	Unknown	January 31, 1994	116	23.4
19	19	"Lost Weekend"	Unknown	Unknown	February 28, 1994	119	21.4
20	20	"Rat Story"	Unknown	Unknown	March 7, 1994	118	22.8
21	21	"Six Years Old and All Washed Up"	Unknown	Unknown	March 14, 1994	120	20.7
22	22	"The Funeral"	James Widdoes	Marco Pennette & Fred Barron	March 28, 1994	122	18.7
23	23	"Saved by Estelle"	Unknown	Unknown	May 2, 1994	121	14.6

=== Season 2 (1994–95) ===
No. overall	No. in season	Title	Directed by	Written by	Original release date	Prod. code	Viewers (millions)
24	1	"I Lost It at the Movies"	James Widdoes	Fred Barron & Marco Pennette	September 12, 1994	202	18.3
25	2	"The Last Auction Hero"	James Widdoes	Carol Gary	September 19, 1994	204	19.0
26	3	"A Room with a View"	Tommy Thompson	Tom J. Astle	September 26, 1994	123	21.1
27	4	"Please Won't You Be My Neighbor"	James Widdoes	Donald Todd	October 3, 1994	201	20.1
28	5	"You Can't Always Get What You Want"	James Widdoes	Fred Barron	October 10, 1994	203	20.5
29	6	"Gone with the Wind: Part 1"	James Widdoes	Carol Gary	October 17, 1994	124	21.4
30	7	"Gone with the Wind: Part 2"	James Widdoes	Donald Todd	October 24, 1994	125	20.1
31	8	"Lobster Envy"	James Widdoes	Marco Pennette & Fred Barron	October 31, 1994	207	19.8
32	9	"Family Membership"	James Widdoes	Donald Todd	November 7, 1994	208	19.7
33	10	"One Mump or Two?"	Tommy Thompson	Brian Hargrove & Jack Kenny	November 14, 1994	209	20.8
34	11	"The Donor Party"	James Widdoes	Carol Gary & Dylan Gary	November 21, 1994	210	20.2
35	12	"How Long Has This Been Going On?"	Tommy Thompson	Story by : Deborah Zoe Dawson & Jodie Mann Massimi; Teleplay by : Fred Barron & Marco Pennette	November 28, 1994	211	19.7
36	13	"Sorry Seems to Be the Hardest Word"	James Widdoes	Donald Todd	December 5, 1994	205	19.6
37	14	"Dis Who's Coming to Dinner?"	James Widdoes	Mark Wilding	January 2, 1995	206	23.2
38	15	"A Pool's Paradise"	James Widdoes	Brian Hargrove & Jack Kenny	January 16, 1995	212	20.4
39	16	"Bear with Me"	James Widdoes	Sheryl J. Anderson	January 23, 1995	213	19.3
40	17	"A Cut Above the Rest"	James Widdoes	Marco Pennette	February 6, 1995	215	20.9
41	18	"The Country Girl"	James Widdoes	Fred Barron & Marco Pennette	February 13, 1995	218	20.0
42	19	"The Accidental Tourists"	James Widdoes	Mark Legan	February 20, 1995	219	20.9
43	20	"The Joint Venture"	Paul Kreppel	Tom J. Astle	February 27, 1995	217	20.8
44	21	"Those Wedding Shel Blues"	Jim Drake	Sheryl J. Anderson	March 13, 1995	220	20.5
45	22	"Nightmare on Maple Street"	James Widdoes	Brian Hargrove & Jack Kenny	April 10, 1995	221	17.1
46	23	"The Mommies"	James Widdoes	Mark Wilding	May 8, 1995	222	16.0
47	24	"Piano, No Strings"	James Widdoes	Donald Todd	May 15, 1995	216	13.7
48	25	"Tommy Doesn't Live Here Anymore"	James Widdoes	Mark Wilding	May 22, 1995	214	13.7

=== Season 3 (1995–96) ===
No. overall	No. in season	Title	Directed by	Written by	Original release date	Prod. code	Viewers (millions)
49	1	"Cleanliness is Next to Nakedness"	Tim O'Donnell	Katherine Green	September 13, 1995	302	13.9
50	2	"It's Not About That..."	James Widdoes	Nick LeRose	September 20, 1995	301	15.0
51	3	"You Must(ang) Remember This"	Jim Drake	Brian Hargrove & Jack Kenny	September 27, 1995	303	13.2
52	4	"What the Early Bird Gets"	Jim Drake	Tom Reeder	October 11, 1995	304	15.8
53	5	"Do the Write Thing"	Tommy Thompson	Mark Legan	October 18, 1995	306	14.8
54	6	"Death of a Saleswoman"	Paul Kreppel	Sheryl J. Anderson	October 25, 1995	307	12.6
55	7	"Writing Wrongs"	Jim Drake	Harry Anderson	November 1, 1995	305	13.7
56	8	"Catch of the Day"	Tim O'Donnell	Nick LeRose	November 8, 1995	308	13.2
57	9	"Health Hath No Fury"	James Widdoes	Brian Hargrove & Jack Kenny	November 15, 1995	310	12.8
58	10	"Leave a Mystery at the Beep"	Jim Drake	Katherine Green	November 22, 1995	309	10.0
59	11	"The Green-Eyed Monster"	Henry Winkler	Tom Reeder	November 29, 1995	311	12.4
60	12	"Working Stiffs"	Jim Drake	Tim O'Donnell	December 20, 1995	312	11.8
61	13	"Pardon My Nuptials"	Jim Drake	Katherine Green	January 3, 1996	314	12.7
62	14	"Gator Bait"	Jim Drake	Nick LeRose	January 10, 1996	313	13.1
63	15	"Those Who Do Be Do Be Do"	Jim Drake	Katherine Green	January 31, 1996	315	13.9
64	16	"Fame"	Jim Drake	Rick Newberger	February 7, 1996	318	11.4
65	17	"Loves Me Like a Rock"	Jim Drake	Rick Newberger	February 14, 1996	316	10.7
66	18	"Nuts and Bolts"	Tommy Thompson	Nick LeRose	February 21, 1996	319	11.5
67	19	"My Girl"	Jim Drake	Brian Hargrove & Jack Kenny	March 6, 1996	317	11.6
68	20	"Stayin' Alive"	Unknown	Unknown	March 13, 1996	321	10.5
69	21	"Do You Want to Know a Secret?"	Jim Drake	Katherine Green	April 3, 1996	322	9.5
70	22	"Double Fault"	Linda Day	Tom Reeder	April 10, 1996	323	8.7
71	23	"Don't Blame Me"	Art Dielhenn	Rick Newberger	April 29, 1996	324	15.5
72	24	"The Good Doctor"	Unknown	Unknown	May 6, 1996	320	15.8
73	25	"L.A. Times"	James Widdoes	Harry Anderson	May 13, 1996	326	16.2
74	26	"It's Not About That, Either"	James Widdoes	Nick LeRose	May 20, 1996	325	14.2

=== Season 4 (1996–97) ===
No. overall	No. in season	Title	Directed by	Written by	Original release date	Prod. code	Viewers (millions)
75	1	"Based on a True Story"	James Widdoes	Rick Newberger	September 13, 1996	401	8.6
76	2	"Solitaire"	Jim Drake	Tom Reeder	September 20, 1996	403	10.3
77	3	"Missed Manners"	Jim Drake	Katherine Green	September 27, 1996	402	9.5
78	4	"Crime and Coconuts"	Unknown	Unknown	October 4, 1996	404	9.9
79	5	"Miami Beached"	Unknown	Unknown	October 11, 1996	405	10.1
80	6	"Daveberry, RFD"	Unknown	Unknown	October 18, 1996	407	10.3
81	7	"A Very Barry Pumpkin Show"	Unknown	Unknown	November 1, 1996	408	10.9
82	8	"Falling"	Unknown	Unknown	November 8, 1996	406	10.8
83	9	"Stress"	Unknown	Unknown	November 22, 1996	409	9.6
84	10	"Starr Tours"	Unknown	Unknown	December 13, 1996	410	8.0
85	11	"The Importance of Missing Earnest"	Unknown	Unknown	December 20, 1996	411	8.7
86	12	"Does the Whale Have to Be White?"	Unknown	Unknown	January 3, 1997	412	10.12
87	13	"Playdate with a Playmate"	Unknown	Unknown	January 10, 1997	413	11.41
88	14	"Spontaneous Combustion"	Unknown	Unknown	January 17, 1997	416	10.80
89	15	"Dave Barry, Call Your Agent"	Unknown	Unknown	January 31, 1997	418	10.35
90	16	"Touched by an Agent"	Unknown	Unknown	February 7, 1997	419	9.98
91	17	"Bad News Barry's"	Unknown	Unknown	February 21, 1997	420	9.70
92	18	"Liar's Poker"	Unknown	Unknown	February 28, 1997	414	9.49
93	19	"Testing... Testing..."	Unknown	Unknown	April 30, 1997	417	9.71
94	20	"Tropical Depression"	Unknown	Unknown	May 7, 1997	423	9.72
95	21	"Oh Dad, Poor Dad"	Unknown	Unknown	June 6, 1997	424	6.87
96	22	"A Woman of Independent Seams"	Unknown	Unknown	June 13, 1997	421	6.02
97	23	"Let Simmer, Then Grill"	Unknown	Unknown	June 20, 1997	422	5.38
98	24	"The Creeping Peril"	Unknown	Unknown	June 27, 1997	415	5.80

== Home media ==
CBS DVD (distributed by Paramount) released the first two seasons of Dave's World on DVD in Region 1 in 2008 and 2009. The theme song for the DVD releases was replaced with a generic rock track.

On July 24, 2012, Season 3 was released as a Manufacture-on-Demand (MOD) release via Amazon.com's CreateSpace program.

DVD name	Ep#	Release date
The First Season	23	August 12, 2008
The Second Season	25	February 3, 2009
The Third Season	26	July 24, 2012

== Ratings ==
The show was originally a hit for CBS when it aired on Monday nights. However, by the third season, it was moved to Wednesdays, and the ratings declined. By the fourth season, the show had moved to the "Friday night death slot" and the resulting drop in ratings led to the program's cancellation.
