= Hilary Salvatore =

American film and television actress (born 1980)

- Born: Hilary Jean Salvatore; February 14, 1980 (age 46); New York City, New York, U.S.
- Occupation: Actress
- Years active: 1995–
- Spouse: Jack Angelo (m. 2005)

Hilary Jean Salvatore (also known as Hilary Salvatore Angelo; born February 14, 1980) is an American film and television actress.

== Education ==
Salvatore comes from an acting family; her brother Jack is also an actor. She graduated with highest honors from Louisville High School in Woodland Hills, California and magna cum laude from California State University, Northridge, where she earned a Bachelor of Arts in Radio, TV and Film with an emphasis in screenwriting. In college, she was a member of the Kappa Kappa Gamma sorority.

== Acting career ==
Salvatore's first big break came with the role of Kelly Phillips in the Nickelodeon series The Secret World of Alex Mack. She has guest-starred on many television programs, including The West Wing, Without a Trace, Easy Streets, 18 Wheels of Justice, Promised Land, NCIS, Dharma and Greg and many others. On the big screen, she has had featured roles in films such as American Pie, Bring It On and Charlie Wilson's War.

== Personal life ==
On October 22, 2005, Salvatore married Jack Angelo, a Los Angeles-based screenwriter and director.

== Filmography ==
=== Film ===
Year	Title	Role	Notes
1996	Ho Ho Nooooooo!!! It's Mr. Bill's Christmas Special!	Older Sister	
1998	The Birth of Jesus	Mary	
1999	American Pie	Girl Holding Out	
2000	Bring It On	Toothless Cheerleader	
2000	Veil	Zoe	Short film
2002	Local Boys	Nicole	
2003	Tangy Guacamole	Jodie	
2007	Charlie Wilson's War	Kelly	Credited as Hilary Angelo

=== Television ===
Year	Title	Role	Notes
1995–1998	The Secret World of Alex Mack	Kelly Phillips	Recurring role; 16 episodes
1997	EZ Streets	Young Theresa	Episode: "A Terrible Beauty"
1998	Saved by the Bell: The New Class	Chloe	Episode: "The Lyin' King"
1998	Promised Land	Rebecca Hixon	Episodes: "On My Honor" & "Restoration"
1998	Dharma & Greg	Dakota	Episode: "Like, Dharma's Totally Got a Date"
1999	Profiler	Claire Putnam	Episode: "Burnt Offerings"
1999	Beverly Hills, 90210	Sally	Episode: "The Phantom Menace"
2001	18 Wheels of Justice	Nikky	Episode: "Wrong Place, Wrong Time"
2001	Go Fish	Corey	Episode: "Go Wrestling"
2001	Gilmore Girls	Lemon	Episode: "Like Mother, Like Daughter"
2002	The West Wing	Emily	Episode: "The Red Mass"
2002	Without a Trace	Unknown role	Episode: "Midnight Sun"
2004	Karen Sisco	Alexa	Episode: "Dog Day Sisco"
2004	Cold Case	Beth Reardon (1992)	Episode: "Late Returns"
2005	NCIS	Petty Officer Jessica Smith	Episode: "Conspiracy Theory"
2007	The Unit	Maddy	Episode: "Every Step You Take"; Credited as Hilary Angelo
2010	Frenemies	Lori Logan	TV series Credited as Hilary Angelo
2014	Sean Saves the World	Kristen	Episode: "Sean the Fabulous"; Credited as Hilary Angelo
2023	Cocaine Sisters	Virginia	Episode: "One Mo' Gin"; Credited as Hilary Angelo
