= Jack Kenny =

American writer, director, actor, and producer

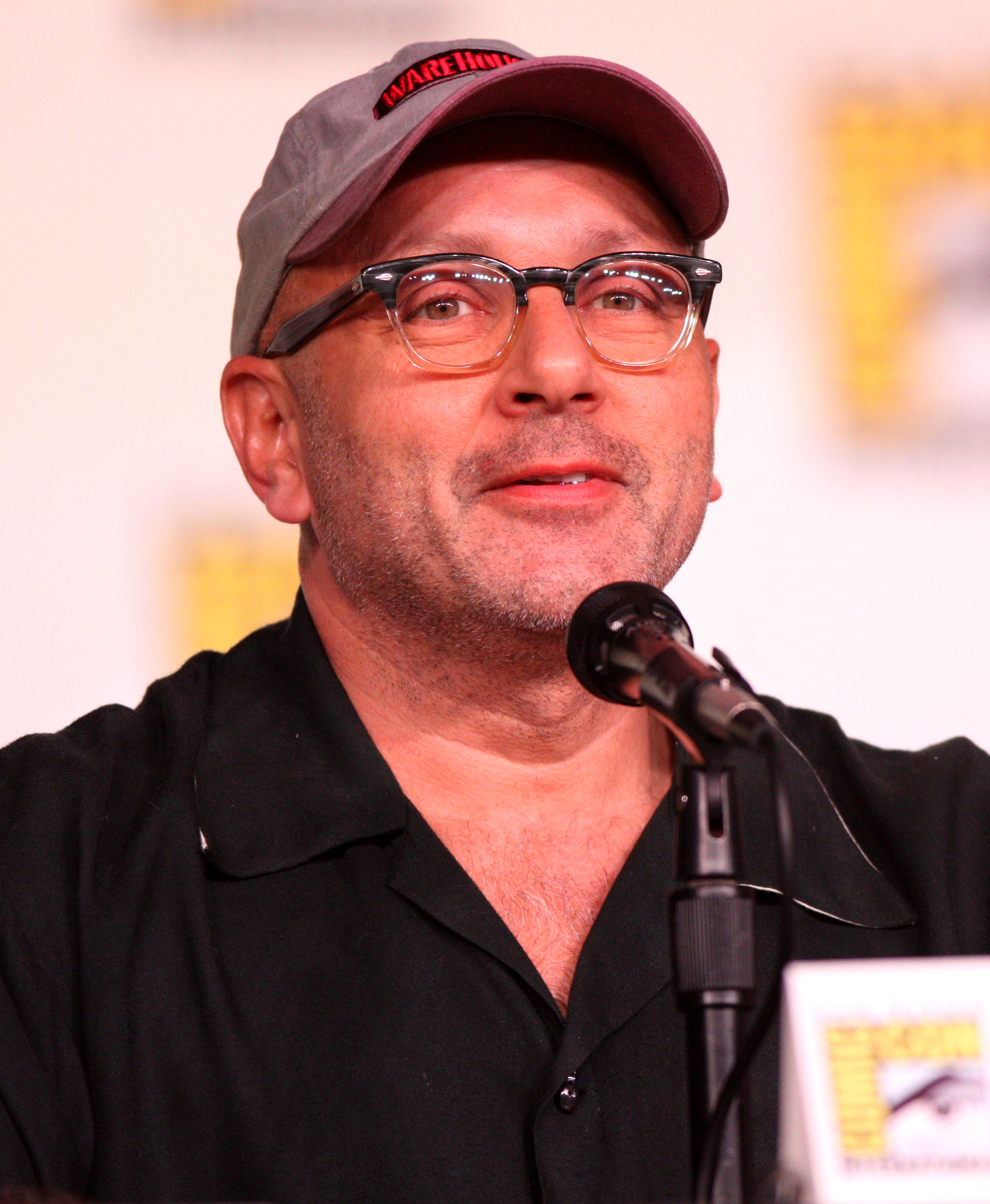
- Kenny at the 2012 San Diego Comic-Con
- Born: March 9, 1958 (age 68); Chicago, Illinois, U.S.
- Education: Juilliard School (BFA)
- Occupations: Writer; director; actor; producer
- Spouse: Michael Goodell (m. 2008)
- Relatives: Roger Goodell (brother-in-law)

Jack Kenny (born March 9, 1958) is an American writer, director, actor, and producer.

== Early life and education ==
Kenny was born in Chicago, Illinois, the son of Sally, a mother and housewife, and Jack, Jr., a business manager for IBM. He grew up in Poughkeepsie, New York and Raleigh, North Carolina. He is a graduate of the Juilliard School Theatre Center, where his classmates in Group 11 included Megan Gallagher, Penny Johnson Jerald, Jack Stehlin, and Lorraine Toussaint.

== Career ==
After graduating from Juilliard, Kenny was a member of John Houseman's The Acting Company, and toured for two seasons. His New York acting debut was in the original production of The Normal Heart at Joseph Papp's Public Theater, and his Broadway debut was as "Motel, the tailor" in the 25th anniversary production of Fiddler on the Roof. He has performed at several Off-Broadway houses, including the Manhattan Theatre Club, Playwrights Horizons, and the Manhattan Punchline. He has numerous TV and film credits, but his first television appearance was on Miami Vice in 1987.

His first TV writing credit was for Square One on PBS. Kenny has written for Nickelodeon's The Secret World of Alex Mack, CBS's Dave's World, NBC's Caroline in the City, Fox's Holding the Baby, Lifetime's Maggie, TNT's Falling Skies, Netflix's Jessica Jones and A Series of Unfortunate Events, ABC's Kevin (Probably) Saves the World, NBC's Zoey's Extraordinary Playlist, among others. He has also written numerous television pilots.

Kenny co-created the television comedy series Titus, which ran for 54 episodes on the Fox Network from 2000 to 2002, with his writing partner Brian Hargrove and comedian Christopher Titus. Kenny and Hargrove also ran the short-lived Fox Network series Wanda at Large.

He was also the creator of the 2006 NBC television series The Book of Daniel, which was cancelled after four episodes had aired. Though NBC gave no official explanation, the program had been the victim of an advertiser boycott by the American Family Association and other groups for its content before a single episode had aired. In a 2006 article in The Advocate, Kenny, who is gay, took issue with the LGBT community for not acting when he and the show were attacked. The Book of Daniel has the further distinction of being the first television series to air on the internet when its last four episodes were streamed in February and March 2006.

In 2008, he signed on as showrunner and executive producer of the original Syfy series Warehouse 13, and subsequently produced 63 episodes of the series, writing and directing several episodes, and appearing in the series finale.

As a director, Kenny has helmed several episodes of Titus, Reba, ABC Family's Roommates, Warehouse 13, a pilot for the WB, and in 2018, he wrote and directed the short film, The Birds Sing Too Loud with Jane Lynch and Kate Mulgrew, which won several festival awards, and was featured on Funny or Die.

In 2014, Kenny joined the advisory board of Sci-Fest, the first annual Los Angeles Science Fiction One-Act Play Festival. He directed a play in the first year of the festival, and was slated to direct another in 2016.

== Personal life ==
Kenny has been with his husband, Michael Goodell, a Level 4 Pilates teacher in Los Angeles, and the son of the late US Senator Charles Goodell of New York, and brother of NFL Commissioner Roger Goodell since August 1982. The couple were legally married in California in July 2008.

His sister, Adele Kenny Sweetwood, is a marketing executive and author of the book The Analytical Marketer.

Kenny has always been active in gay rights causes and gay politics. In 1991, he, along with Ken Daigle and Tom Viola, founded Broadway Pride, a group of Broadway and Off-Broadway LGBT actors and crew to march in that year's Gay Pride Parade in New York City. It was the first such organization to march in a Pride parade that was strictly a professional-oriented group with no health or AIDS-related affiliations.
