= Meredith Bishop =

American actress, writer and producer

- Occupations: Actress; writer; producer
- Years active: 1985–present

Meredith Bishop is an American actress, writer and producer. Bishop is best known for her role as Annie Mack in Nickelodeon's The Secret World of Alex Mack, which ran on the network from 1994–1998.

== Career ==
Bishop began acting professionally in 1985, though would not gain international recognition until her role as Annie Mack in Nickelodeon's The Secret World of Alex Mack in 1994.

Bishop has appeared in numerous theater productions in the Los Angeles area over the course of several decades. In 1996, Bishop received a Los Angeles Drama Critics Circle Award for Best Lead Performance in Lee Blessing's Eleemosynary. Bishop has also received two Ovation Award nominations, one for Best Lead Actress in a Play for The Concept of Remainders and one for Best Featured Actress in a Play for her performance in Aftermath. Bishop also co-starred in Better at the Echo Theater, Complete at the Matrix Theater, and played a young Rose Kennedy in The Color of Rose which premiered at the Kirk Douglas Theatre.

Bishop executive produced and starred in the 2003 film Klepto, which premiered at the 2003 CineVegas Film Festival.

Bishop is also known for co-producing and co-starring in the comedy web series Grip and Electric for which she earned an Indie Series Award nomination for Best Actress in a Comedy. Grip and Electric, which co-starred Henry Thomas, Lin Shaye, Janet Varney, Burl Moseley, Izzy Diaz, and Andrew Burlinson, was favorably reviewed by the New York Times and TubeFilter.

In 2018, Bishop wrote, co-produced and starred in the short film See You Soon, a dark comedy which was an official selection at the HollyShorts Film Festival.

Bishop has also appeared on many network TV programs including Scrubs, Mad About You, Felicity, Good Luck Charlie and Agents of S.H.I.E.L.D..

Bishop has also appeared in numerous commercials including the KitKat "Jack-O'-Lantern" commercial, the Bud Light "Book Club" commercial which aired during Super Bowl XLIV and the GEICO "Reality Show" commercial which features a young couple competing in a fake reality TV show called Tiny House. "Reality Show" was listed among the top ten most popular GEICO commercials of all time.

== Filmography ==
=== Film ===
Year	Title	Role	Notes
1985	Kidsongs	Jumproper	Video short, "A Day at Old MacDonald's Farm"
2003	Klepto	Emily Brown	
2010	Bed & Breakfast: Love is a Happy Accident	Celeste	
2012	Austin, We Have a Problem	Austin Powders / Jen	Short
2014	Knights of the Long Table	Guinevere / Wonder Woman	Short
2015	The Serenader	Joy Lewis	Short
2015	Body + Blood		Short
2016	Skin	Girlfriend	Short
2018	See You Soon	Meg	Short

=== Television ===
Year	Title	Role	Notes
1994–98	The Secret World of Alex Mack	Annie Mack	Main role, series regular
1997	Mad About You	18-Year-Old Mabel	Episode: "Letters to Mabel"
1998	Sliders	Jenny Anderson	Episode: "The Dying Fields"
2000	Chicken Soup for the Soul	Denise	Episode: "The Right Thing"
2001	Nikki	Lurleen	2 episodes
2001–02	Felicity	Samantha	3 episodes
2006	Scrubs	Melissa	Episode: "My Day at the Races"
2008	Speedie Date	Nina	New media series
2014	Good Luck Charlie	Rhonda	Episode: "Good Bye Charlie"
2015	Agents of S.H.I.E.L.D.	Officer Anderson	Episode: "Love in the Time of Hydra"
2016	Grip and Electric	Heather	New media series

== Theatre ==
Recent theatre performances include:

- Atonement (2007)
- The Concept of Remainders (2008)
- Breaking and Entering (2009)
- The Color of Rose (2010)
- London's Scars (2010)
- AfterMath (2011)
- Complete (2013)
- Better (2014)

== Awards and nominations ==
Los Angeles Drama Critics Circle Awards

- 1996: Winner, Lead Performance for the role of Echo in Eleemosynary

Ovation Awards

- 2008: Nominated for Lead Actress in a Play for the role of Sophie in The Concept of Remainders
- 2011: Nominated for Featured Actress in a Play for the role of Natalie in Aftermath

Indie Series Awards

- 2017: Nominated for Best Actress in a Comedy for the role of Heather in Grip and Electric
