= Jessie Jones (actress) =

American actress and playwright (1950–2026)

- Born: August 21, 1950; Texas, U.S.
- Died: March 20, 2026 (aged 75); Washington, D.C., U.S.
- Education: University of Texas at Austin
- Occupations: Actress, playwright

Jessie Jones (August 21, 1950 – March 20, 2026) was an American television actress and playwright. She was on the internationally broadcast shows Murphy Brown, Melrose Place, Night Court, and Who's the Boss?. She also co-wrote scripts with Nicholas Hope and Jamie Wooten. Jones died after a long illness on March 20, 2026, at the age of 75.
