= Titus (TV series) =

American television sitcom

- The Titus logo used in the opening credits
- Genre: Sitcom; Black comedy
- Created by: Christopher Titus; Jack Kenny; Brian Hargrove
- Starring: Christopher Titus; Zack Ward; Cynthia Watros; Stacy Keach; Frances Fisher; David Shatraw; Rachel Roth; Elizabeth Berkley
- Country of origin: United States
- Original language: English
- No. of seasons: 4
- No. of episodes: 56 (list of episodes)

Production
- Executive producers: Christopher Titus; Jack Kenny; Brian Hargrove; Michael Hanel; Mindy Schultheis
- Producers: Chris Sheridan; Randy Cordray; Faye Oshima Belyeu
- Camera setup: Multi-camera
- Running time: approx. 22 minutes
- Production companies: Kenny & Hargrove; Deranged Entertainment; 20th Century Fox Television

Original release
- Network: Fox
- Release: March 20, 2000 – August 12, 2002

Titus is an American dark comedy sitcom that debuted on Fox in 2000. The series was created by its star, Christopher Titus, Jack Kenny, and Brian Hargrove. The sitcom is based on Titus's stand-up comedy act, more specifically his one-man show Norman Rockwell is Bleeding (which itself would be broadcast on television in 2004), which was based loosely upon his real-life family; lines from Norman Rockwell is Bleeding were spoken by Titus as commentary. Titus plays an outwardly childish adult based on himself, who owns a custom car shop. The show follows him and his dimwitted adopted brother Dave, his girlfriend Erin with the "heart of gold", his goody-goody friend Tommy, and his arrogantly lewd, bigoted, heavy smoking and drinking, womanizing, divorced multiple times, father Ken "Papa" Titus.

== Production history ==
Titus began doing comedy when he was 18. After two years of relatively normal comedy bits, his act soon began to evolve to focus around his family, particularly his father's heart attacks and his mother's mental illness.

One night while performing, an assistant to a Fox executive was in the audience, and he brought his bosses to the show.

Knowing he had a deal with Fox, Titus wanted "Dad is Dead" to be the pilot. After the series ended, Titus commented that, if one watches Norman Rockwell is Bleeding, and then "Dad is Dead", the latter essentially "rapes" the former.

Because Kenny and Hargrove came from live theater, and Titus from live comedy, it was a unanimous decision that the live story would be shot in real time, like a play, in as few takes as possible; the action would pause briefly, as cues for the editors in post-production for incorporation of flashbacks and action in the neutral space, and then the action would resume. Episodes were blocked and rehearsed extensively, and shot on Friday every week.

The cast also had different methods of working. Being a comedian, Titus knew where the punchline would be and never explored anything else. Zack Ward had difficulty finding the joke during rehearsals, but Kenny realized that he was looking for where the joke could be. Watros asked Titus to point out where the joke was, and promised to hit her marks. During breaks in rehearsal, Shatraw would work by himself on set, looking for specific quirks or actions that Tommy would do or take.

The season two episode "The Last Noelle" is one of Titus's favorites, and is based on his relationship with an abusive ex-girlfriend.

As a running gag, in most of the episodes there is a reference to guns and/or fire, usually the threat of someone or something being set on fire, as well as Titus's story of how he drunkenly fell into a bonfire and nearly died when he was a teenager.

=== Casting ===
Cynthia Watros was the first person to audition for the role of Erin, and was also the first person cast. Steve Carell and Zack Ward both auditioned for Tommy; Carell lost out to David Shatraw, while Ward was soon cast as Titus's brother, Dave. After a number of auditions for Titus's father Ken, Stacy Keach was cast after Titus admitted Keach intimidated him.

Before his death, Christopher's real father, Ken Titus, would give tips to Keach on how to better portray him. Titus also admitted that, even with the driest line the writers could invent, Keach would find a way to make the line funny. This often upset Titus because Keach's set-up would be funnier than Titus's punchline. Hargrove has also commented that Keach could get an audience response with just a look; Hargrove's favorite moment is the look Ken gives Tommy in "Insanity Genetic (1)" after Tommy comments "I have no nuts."

=== Censorship by the network ===
More than one episode was censored/banned by Fox, including a two-part episode made in the months after the September 11 attacks that centers on the premise that the U.S. government believes Titus and his family and friends are a terrorist group after a series of misunderstandings – as a result of his mother's suicide, Titus suffers a nervous breakdown on the plane ride home, Tommy complains to a flight attendant about his mispronunciation of 'chicken à la king', to the point where Tommy gets down on his knees and cries "A la, a la, a la king!" (which sounds like "Allah king"), and Dave comes out of the plane's bathroom gurgling mouthwash, which seems like he is speaking unintelligibly, and wearing a towel turban, a robe, and shaving cream on his face which resembles an Islamic beard.

The episode "The Intervention" was also almost banned, as the censors were wary about the episode glorifying alcoholism, since the story focused on Titus convincing his father, Ken, to start drinking again since Ken's sobriety is making him boring. Titus had to read the script to the president of Fox page-by-page over the phone to show him how the episode could be funny.

Another episode, "The Protector", was not aired until the very end of the last season, as it dealt with the revelation that Erin's niece, Amy, was molested by a male family friend who looked after her while her parents were in prison, which Amy remembers because the man had a rose tattoo on his penis. Had "The Protector" aired in production order, viewers would have seen the real reason behind Amy's asocial, criminal behavior (besides the fact that her parents are drug addicts who neglected her and were always in jail for drug crimes or domestic violence). Also, if "The Protector" had been broadcast in production order, the references to Amy being molested and going after a boy who sexually harassed her in school (who turns out to be the son of the man who molested Amy) in such episodes as "The Session" and "Insanity Genetic (2)" (which, in production code order, aired after "The Protector") would have made more sense.

"The Wedding" was aired out of order, as well, as the season three premiere "Racing in the Streets" deals with Titus's recovery from the accident in "The Pit" and continues in "The Pendulum", yet he seems unaffected and the accident is not mentioned in the season two finale. This is also confirmed by these episodes' production codes, which puts "The Wedding" in between "Tommy's Girlfriend II" and "Hard Ass". "The Wedding" was banned due to scenes depicting violence at a church—Juanita's second husband punches her in the face after the two argue about Juanita taking her medication, and Juanita ends up shooting him after Titus, Ken, Dave, and the priest presiding over the wedding tie up the man and yell at him for abusing her.

=== Cancellation ===
On a Sirius Radio interview on Raw Dog 104, Titus said the show got canceled due to an argument with executives. They wanted to split up Titus and Erin because the show Dharma & Greg had done similar and their ratings went up. Titus refused, because not only was he still married to his then-real wife, Erin Carden, but the entire focus of the show as "two screwed up people living a normal life" would be compromised. Upon Titus's refusal, on-air promotion ceased and the show was soon canceled. In another radio interview, he claimed the show was also taken down for its content and being "too edgy".

=== Cancelled revival ===
As of May 2010, Christopher Titus was reportedly in negotiations with the Fox network to start up a new series again, billed as a sequel of sorts to his first sitcom (and based on his comedy specials The 5th Annual End of the World Tour and Love Is Evol). The series was confirmed to eventually be revived and pick up eight years later with Titus divorced from Erin, Titus's father dead, and Titus dealing with his new normal girlfriend and her perfect family.

In March 2014, Titus posted on his Facebook page that the revival project was shut down due to legal issues with 20th Century Fox and limited funding.

== Format ==
Part of the show's success was its unique format; a few exceptions aside, the show stuck to what worked. The "neutral space" was where Titus opened and ended the show. This lead-in and lead-out allowed for one liners and a monologue, before heading to what the producers called the Main Narrative, or "Live Story". The live story was the bulk of the action, and was the basis for the theme of the episode and the other gags. The live story was unique in that it was extensively rehearsed throughout a production week, and shot in one day, in as few takes as possible. The result allowed the actors to keep their comedic timing, and kept the studio audience engaged to the point that the show did not have to employ a laugh track. Also of note was that the Live Story was (for an overwhelming majority of shows) shot on just one set.

Most episodes also took place over a short course of time, usually only a few hours; very rarely would a plot carry over to "the next day". The main narrative was frequently intercut with the neutral space, sometimes just a quick one-liner from Titus, or for either informative exposition, a quick flashback, or a sparingly used fantasy scene. The Live Story would also usually take place in one place, either a recurring location like Ken's house, the garage of Titus's car shop, or a one-time location like a bus station or a houseboat.

=== Neutral space ===
Christopher Titus in the "neutral space", where he provides commentary and exposition

The show always opened and closed in the black and white neutral space, usually with the same sentence, or a reasonable facsimile thereof. Titus was the neutral space's only occupant except in two episodes, when he was replaced by Ken and Erin, respectively, and would appear always wearing similar clothes, with a wooden chair, a lightbulb, and the bland walls. Frequently, props appeared for one-shot gags in the neutral space. Very rarely would anything from the Live Story appear there (one notable exception was Dave's suicide note in "Private Dave"), nor would anything from the neutral space appear in the Live Story. There are many allusions to the neutral space being Titus's mind, though it is never said outright. On a few occasions, the neutral space is used to demonstrate the passing of time, or Christopher will do something "in" the neutral space when he is really just thinking about it while doing it; we only see his thought process. Also, as in "The Trial", sometimes he will say something in the neutral space and not realize he is also saying it in reality, like when he calls the prosecutor an idiot, thinking he only thought it. Following the credits in the final episode of the series ("The Protector", not "Insanity Genetic" or "Homecoming"), Titus drags the bare wooden chair into the middle of a real life street, sets it on fire, and walks away, whistling part of the theme song.

=== Flashbacks ===
Flashbacks – always introduced from the Neutral Space – were frequently used for character development and background. Flashbacks generally went back to one of three time periods: when Titus was five, ten, or seventeen. Three different child actors played the five- and ten-year-old versions of Titus, the latter sometimes joined by five-year-old and ten-year-old versions of Dave and Tommy. Flashbacks to high school with the seventeen year old Titus had all of the current actors playing the younger versions of themselves. To compensate for being too old to believably play the roles, the actors have humorously exaggerated costumes and mannerisms. Except for a few flashbacks in "Grandma Titus" that featured Ken as a child, Stacy Keach is the only one to appear in all of his character's flashbacks; only his hair and clothes change with the times. The flashbacks themselves had no specific format other than being quick, one laugh gags. They frequently showcased Ken Titus's unique approach to parenting, relationships, and drinking. The women that Ken is shown dating (or even married to) in these flashbacks are frequently not given a name, and their faces are rarely shown. Episodes with guest characters who had any connection with the main characters, like Tommy or Erin's families, frequently appeared in flashbacks as well.

Occasionally, instead of a flashback, a far-fetched "What if...?" scenario (showing an alternate reality, what Titus's life will be like when he is older, or a one-off gag similar to those found on The Simpsons and Family Guy) will be presented, such as Titus and Erin as a bickering married couple in their old age, Titus and his father as rich men who use their butlers to beat each other up while Christopher and Ken read the newspaper, Titus trying to deal with Ken being married to a man, and Titus, Dave, and Ken as heads on a couch.

== Characters ==
Overview of characters on Titus
Role	Performer	Character Summary
Christopher Titus	Christopher Titus	The protagonist and center of the dysfunctional chaos of the show. Christopher tries to mediate things in his dysfunctional life (his hard-nosed, alcoholic father, his gifted, yet mentally deranged mother, and his stoner brother) and situations, although he finds himself at loss for words in some situations. Christopher owns his own car shop called Titus High Performance, and employs his brother Dave and his friend Tommy there. Titus sometimes feels that Erin is in denial or disillusion when it comes to dealing with "crazy people" and has his own way of going about things, sometimes behind her back. Christopher is always striving to seek his father's approval but rarely gets far, though it is clear that he loves both his parents despite their faults.
Erin Fitzpatrick	Cynthia Watros	Christopher's girlfriend and later fiancé, with a dysfunctional family of her own. Both her parents – Nora (Susan Barnes) and Merritt (Hamilton Camp) – are alcoholics; her sister, Kim, is a sexually promiscuous drug addict with a wild teenage daughter [Amy] whom she hardly cares for; and her brother, Michael, is a criminal who is constantly beaten by his father. Erin put herself in denial when it comes to dysfunctionality, often convincing herself that everything is fine. She often puts herself in over her head and Christopher usually comes to her rescue. She often tries to mend the relationship between Christopher and Ken, but rarely gets far. She is the only girl that Ken likes and often is willing to do things for her. She is loving and caring but often is taken advantage of, causing her to sometimes do the exact opposite of what she really feels. She is based on Christopher Titus's then-wife Erin Carden.
Dave Scoville aka Dave Titus^{[a]}	Zack Ward / Adam Hicks (child)	Christopher's adopted brother. Dave was abandoned by his mother (Ken's third wife, who left Ken because she couldn't handle having her self-esteem crushed by him) when he was young. He is a stoner who, despite his marijuana habit, is a savant when it comes to detailing cars and has flashes of genius (on "Houseboat", there was a flashback of Dave reviving his dead father, Ken, by opening a beer just as the paramedics were ready to pronounce Ken dead from a heart attack).
Ken Titus	Stacy Keach	Christopher and Dave's father, a hard-drinking, chain-smoking, skirt-chasing, politically incorrect man who often pulls cruel pranks on Christopher and Dave (but not Shannon or the other stepkids who temporarily lived with him) to keep them from being "wussies". He was married and divorced five times, with all of his ex-wives cleaning him out every time. Despite being an addict, Ken has, to quote Titus, "never missed a car payment, never missed a house payment, never missed a day of work," and would make sure his kids were provided for before himself, often going without for the sake of his kids if money was ever tight. Ken also has a daughter named Shannon (Elizabeth Berkley) from the episode "Shannon's Song", whom he treats better than his own son. According to the episodes "Houseboat", "Grandma Titus", and "The Session", it's implied that Ken's behavior is the result of being raised by a drunken father who always partied and a cruel mother (played by Phyllis Diller) who often took out the emotional abuse she got from Ken's father on her own son.
Tommy Shafter	David Shatraw / Sean Marquette (child)	Christopher's buddy since childhood. The supposed "normal" one, Tommy is often mistaken for being a homosexual – the result of emulating his father, Perry (who actually was gay, but kept it a secret while married to Tommy's mother). When Perry came out of the closet, Tommy severed ties with his father, not because of his homosexuality, but because Perry lied to his mother and abandoned her without any consideration for her feelings. In "After Mrs. Shafter", Perry realizes he was wrong to break up with Tommy's mother and tries to reconcile with her, only to find that Ken wants to date her. In the end, Perry, Mrs. Shafter, and Ken enter a sort of three-way relationship, which Titus, Dave, and Erin find morally abhorrent, but Tommy likes, as it means he can bond with his father again. Perry can do the affectionate things she likes, while she can have sex with Ken.
Amy Fitzpatrick	Rachel Roth	Erin's rebellious teenage niece who lives with Erin and Christopher during the third season after getting in trouble for beating her uncle (Erin's brother, Michael) over the head with a skateboard. Lived with her drug addict mom (Erin's sister, Kim) and her abusive alcoholic stepfather (Kim's boyfriend, Bob), both of which were either too stoned or in jail too often to care for Amy. In "The Protector", it was revealed that Amy was sexually molested by a man who offered to care for Amy while Amy's parents were in jail (and the man is the father of a boy who harasses Amy at school and sells pornographic magazines out of his locker to the other kids). In "Errr", it is revealed that Amy is a lesbian and has a girlfriend named Charlie.

^a"Dave Titus" appears on the DVD material, but Dave's last name was given as Scoville in the show. The only clue to this discrepancy in the show proper is when Dave says he was never legally adopted by his father in the first season episode "Red Asphalt".

== Episodes ==
Season	Episodes	Originally released	
Season	Episodes	First released	Last released
1	9	March 20, 2000	May 22, 2000
2	24	October 3, 2000	May 22, 2001
3	21	November 14, 2001	August 12, 2002
4	2	August 21, 2020	

== Season ratings ==
Ratings for Titus
Season	TV Season	Ratings Rank	Viewers (in millions)
1	1999–2000	No. 61	9.53
2	2000–2001	No. 67	9.7
3	2001–2002	No. 89	7.9

== Home releases ==
Anchor Bay Entertainment (under license from 20th Century Fox Home Entertainment) released the entire series on DVD in Region 1 in two packages in 2005/2006. Both are now out of print. In 2020, Christopher Titus himself began sharing full episodes of the show on his YouTube channel, eventually uploading all of the episodes. A few of them also have introductions where Titus briefly describes the premise of the episode itself.

Home media releases for Titus
DVD name	Ep #	Release date	Additional information
Seasons 1 & 2	33	July 12, 2005	Audio Commentaries; Hard Laughs; Rehearsal Footage; Promos for Titus; Cross-Promo Trailers: Doogie Howser M.D. & Profit
Season 3	21	January 17, 2006	Audio Commentary with Creator/Star Christopher Titus and Creators Brian Hargrove and Jack Kenny; "Brotherly Love": An Interview with Zach Ward; "His Better Half": An Interview with Cynthia Watros; "Honor Thy Father": An Interview with Stacey Keach; Gag Reel

== Reunion episode ==
On August 21, 2020, Titus aired "The Titus Family Reunion" show on YouTube through Eventbrite which brought back the primary actors and added Titus's real-life wife Rachel Bradley as Rachel. The reunion episode (titled Titus Family for legal reasons) was set eight years after the finale with Titus getting released from the mental institution and coming home to find that Erin is leaving him for Tommy and ending with Titus going to Mexico to get Papa Titus out of a Mexican jail. The special was written, directed and produced by Titus under his brand Combustion Films and was shot in a few days during the COVID-19 pandemic. The two-part episode was available as a downloadable purchase on Christopher Titus's Combustion Films website, and is available as a 2-part Homecoming episode on YouTube.
