= Klepto (film) =

2003 film directed by Thomas Trail

- Klepto DVD cover
- Directed by: Thomas Trail
- Written by: Thomas Trail; Ethan Gross
- Starring: Meredith Bishop; Jsu Garcia; Leigh Taylor-Young; Henry Czerny; Kansas Bowling
- Distributed by: Magnolia Pictures
- Release dates: March 5, 2003 (Cinequest Film Festival); April 18, 2006 (United States)
- Running time: 82 minutes
- Country: United States
- Language: English

Klepto is a 2003 straight-to-DVD independent thriller film starring Meredith Bishop and Jsu Garcia. It is the debut film of director Thomas Trail and premiered at the 2003 CineVegas Film Festival.

== Plot ==
In Los Angeles, Emily Brown is a kleptomaniac who is addicted to pills and misses her jailed father, and is undergoing therapy trying to resolve her compulsion. She has a police record for shoplifting, and her mother Teresa is a compulsive shopper whose spending has ruined her financially. The security guard Nick, of Bernstein's department store, sees Emily through a camera and becomes fascinated with her. She resists his advances, which are tinged with blackmail, but her mother approves. When Nick, a couch-surfing divorcee, gets in trouble dealing ecstasy, he presses Emily to help him rob Bernstein's. She resents being coerced into a carefully planned crime and finds a way of both thwarting his plans and bailing-out her mother.

== Cast ==
- Meredith Bishop as Emily Brown
  - Grace Korkunis as Young Emily Brown
- Jsu Garcia as Nick
- Leigh Taylor-Young as Teresa
- Henry Czerny as Ivan
- Michael Nouri as Dr. Cohn
- Michael Irby as Marco
- Kirk B.R. Woller as Jeffries
- Michael E. Rodgers as Sandy Hauser
- Dorian Lopinto as Ms. Hall
- Tori Meyer as Gretchen
- Scott Satenspiel as Jason Klartich
- Kansas Bowling as Nick's Daughter (credited as Kansas Skye)
- Teressa Tunney as Nick's Ex-Wife
- Jeff Garvin as Jimmy, The Store Clerk
- Teala Davies as Shoplifter
- Mark Chaet as Pharmacist
- Al Israel as Watch Salesman

== Reviews ==
Dennis Harvey, of Variety called Klepto an "engaging serio-comedy" and "nifty little character study-cum-caper" picture.

Preston Jones, of DVD Talk praised "a pair of winning performances" in a screenplay which "draws you in close for a subtly surprising finale".

== Home media ==
A Region-free PAL 4:3 (original was anamorphic 1.78:1) DVD was published in Australia by Flashback Entertainment.
