= The Secret World of Alex Mack =

American television series (1994–1998)

- Genre: Science fiction; Superhero; Fantasy; Teen drama; Comedy
- Created by: Thomas W. Lynch; Ken Lipman
- Starring: Larisa Oleynik; Darris Love; Meredith Bishop; Michael Blakley; Dorian Lopinto
- Theme music composer: John Coda
- Composer: Jerry J. Grant
- Country of origin: United States
- Original language: English
- No. of seasons: 4
- No. of episodes: 78 (list of episodes)

Production
- Executive producers: Thomas W. Lynch; John D. Lynch
- Producers: David Brookwell; Sean McNamara; Matt Dearborn; Gary L. Stephenson; Greg A. Hampson
- Production location: Santa Clarita, California
- Editor: Cindy Parisotto
- Running time: 23–24 minutes
- Production companies: Lynch Entertainment; Hallmark Entertainment (Note: Known as RHI Entertainment during the first two seasons.); Nickelodeon Productions

Original release
- Network: Nickelodeon
- Release: October 8, 1994 – January 15, 1998

The Secret World of Alex Mack is an American science fiction television series that aired on Nickelodeon from October 8, 1994, to January 15, 1998. The series was co-created by Ken Lipman and Thomas W. Lynch and was produced by Lynch Entertainment, Hallmark Entertainment and Nickelodeon Productions. The Secret World of Alex Mack was accompanied by a tie-in series of 34 paperback books, as well as a variety of merchandise.

== Plot ==
"I'm Alex Mack. I was just an average kid until an accident changed my life. And since then, nothing's been the same. My best friend Ray thinks it's cool. My sister Annie thinks I'm a science project. I can't let anyone else know. Not even my parents. I know the chemical plant wants to find me and turn me into some experiment. But you know something? I guess I'm not so average anymore."

— Alex Mack's opening exposition

Alexandra "Alex" Mack is an ordinary teenage girl living in the industrial town of Paradise Valley with her parents, George and Barbara, and her precocious older sister Annie. The town largely revolves around Paradise Valley Chemical, a factory that employs most of the adult residents but has a notoriously shady history and staff.

While walking home after her first day of junior high, Alex is nearly hit by a truck from Paradise Valley Chemical driven by David Watt, and during the incident, she is accidentally drenched in GC-161, an experimental chemical developed by the factory. She soon discovers it has given her strange powers, including telekinesis, the ability to generate electricity from her fingertips, and the ability to morph into a mobile puddle of liquid. Though Alex finds her powers exciting, they are unpredictable—sometimes her skin glows bright yellow when she's nervous. She confides only in Annie and her best friend Ray, choosing to keep her powers a secret from everyone else, including her parents, in order to protect herself from the chemical factory's ruthless CEO Danielle Atron.

=== Series overview ===
The series evolves from seasons 1–4 from innocent hijinks to darker connotations; seasons 1–2 mostly deal with cheerful misadventures and comedic encounters with incompetent Paradise Valley Chemical staff Vince and Dave. Seasons 3–4 take on a more serious and dark development, in which it is revealed that Danielle Atron had been developing GC-161 as far back as the 1970s and that she may have had fellow scientists and researchers systematically assassinated to cover up GC-161's mutagenic effects on people.

Subplots of the series included Barbara Mack going back to college as a mature student; Alex and her friends being targeted by a school bully; Alex's crush, Scott, turning out to be a fairweather friend; and Louis Driscoll befriending Alex and Ray after moving to Paradise Valley as a new student. Vince, meanwhile, is fired in season 3 and replaced by an asocial Vienna-born scientist named Lars Frederickson. Vince frequently reappears as a guest character, obsessed with getting his job back. While Alex was initially bullied by an older student named Jessica in season 1, Jessica's actress, Jessica Alba, left for other projects, and the character was replaced with Kelly, a preppy but mean-spirited cheerleader, and later Jo (the aforementioned school bully who goes after Alex and Ray).

In season 4, Alex develops a serious relationship with Hunter, a new boy in town. She initially believes he is infatuated with Danielle Atron after discovering what appears to be a love shrine to the woman in his bedroom, but Hunter is revealed to be investigating Danielle's potential involvement in the death of his scientist father by drowning. Alex shares her first kiss with Hunter.

== Characters ==
=== Main ===
- Alexandra "Alex" Mack (portrayed by Larisa Oleynik) – Alex is an average teenage girl in Paradise Valley. While walking home from school, she is nearly hit by a truck carrying GC-161 and is doused with it, thus giving her extraordinary powers. Among them are telekinesis, the ability to generate electricity from her fingertips, and the ability to liquefy and travel from place to place in the form of a puddle of liquid. She briefly manifests superhuman strength due to her body having an unusual reaction to a new curry recipe her mother had just tried. However, this was only valid in one episode, as her mother never used the recipe again.
- Raymond "Ray" Alvarado (portrayed by Darris Love) – Alex's best friend and next door neighbor, and the only one besides Annie to know about Alex's powers.
- Anne "Annie" Mack (portrayed by Meredith Bishop) – Alex's older sister, and a scientific genius in her own right. Next to Ray, she is the only one who originally knows about Alex's powers. She administers various scientific tests to ensure Alex's safety. She also hopes to one day present her research, in an effort to stop Danielle Atron.
- George Mack (portrayed by Michael Blakley) – Annie and Alex's father. He is a brilliant chemist who works for Danielle Atron at the Paradise Valley Chemical Plant.
- Barbara Mack (portrayed by Dorian Lopinto) – Annie and Alex's mother. She is a more down-to-earth woman who works in a public relations firm which represents the chemical plant.

=== Villains ===
- Danielle Atron (portrayed by Louan Gideon) – The CEO of the Paradise Valley Chemical Plant who is the main antagonist of the series. She wants to market GC-161 as a radical new weight-loss drug, and is increasingly focused on finding the GC-161 child (who she never discovers is Alex until the last two episodes) and capture them, as both a test subject and a threat to the secrecy of her plans. In season 2, Danielle's childhood is examined, revealing that she was a prodigy. When Danielle stopped speaking to her grandparents, neighbors started gossiping that she was removed from her home after she was discovered locked in the basement by her mother. Her grandmother sold the land Danielle later bought as a location to build Paradise Valley Chemical. In season 4, it's revealed in a newspaper clipping in Hunter's bedroom that Danielle had rescued several people in a fire at a rival chemical plant, but that the accident caused toxicity and genetic defects affecting Danielle and the other fire victims, after which Danielle established Paradise Valley Chemical as the main factory in town. Danielle's grandmother was played by Michael Learned in season 2's "The Secret", a Halloween-themed episode. By the end of the series, Atron's departure by helicopter is thwarted by Hunter and she is arrested by the authorities.
- Vincent "Vince" Carter (portrayed by John Marzilli) – The head of security at the Paradise Valley Chemical Plant, Vince is a former Navy Seal and uses illegal tactics to protect Danielle's interests. Vince often remarks about the Federal Government, "I'm not one of their favourite guys", and is mentally unstable, although it is never made entirely clear what occurred in his past that drove him to work for Paradise Valley Chemical. He makes it his obsession to find the GC-161 child (even after he gets fired from the Plant). After being fired, he wears military garb and talks to himself. Despite often being cruel to Dave, he at times does treat Dave as possibly the only real friend he has. While trapped in an air duct in the Mack House at one point, he breaks down sobbing after Barbara says of him "the man had no friends" (from her time working alongside him).
- Lars Frederickson (portrayed by Kevin Quigley) – A skilled chemist hailing from the Paradise Valley Chemical Plant's foreign branch in Vienna. He becomes Danielle Atron's chief subordinate after Vince gets fired. Lars has a shy wife named Inez, who attends an awkward dinner at the Mack household. Annie and Lars together uncover a disturbing report from the 1970s revealing that GC-161 is older than either of them initially believed, and that all the scientists on the original research project, aside from Danielle Atron, are missing or deceased. This bothers Lars, who goes to Danielle to question her, but then he decides to help her cover up the report.
- Elias Griffin (portrayed by Francis X. McCarthy) – Griffin was a member of the Food and Drug Administration, who was secretly being bribed by Danielle Atron to hide the side-effects of GC-161 so that it would be approved faster. After failing a lie detector test given by Gino, Griffin is arrested. The character appears throughout season 4.

=== Recurring ===
- Louis Driscoll (portrayed by Benjamin Kimball Smith) – Alex and Ray's abrasive friend, who moves to Paradise Valley from Cincinnati in season 2. At first Alex is jealous of Louis, but they finally become friends. Alex and her gang generally find Louis annoying, with a grandiose personality, but at times he can be a very caring and well-meaning person, such as when he attempts to rescue a young child trapped beneath a cement pipe, or when he helps Alex make a friendship video for Nathan Dean in their class. Louis's father is a businessman and entrepreneur.
- David "Dave" Watt (portrayed by John Nielsen) – The seemingly dim-witted truck driver who was driving the truck that accidentally dumped the GC-161 chemical on Alex. As the only witness to the accident, Dave is often forced by Danielle Atron to serve as a partner to Vince Carter in trying to capture Alex. After seeing Alex using her powers while she was in high school, Dave keeps it a secret from Danielle to protect her as he knew what kind of horrible experiments Danielle had planned for her. In season 4, Dave reveals himself to be much more intelligent than Danielle believes, telling her that he just likes living a simple life, and serving as a whistleblower to George Mack about corruption at the plant. Alex hugs him after learning that he kept her secret to protect her, and George, in gratitude, later promises Dave a job at another chemical plant.
- Scott Greene (portrayed by Jason Strickland) – Alex's junior high school crush, an older sports jock who dates Kelly later on. Alex eventually discovers Scott's vapid nature when he steals her photos that she took while working for the school scrapbook.
- Jessica (portrayed by Jessica Alba) – Scott's first girlfriend and Alex's first school rival.
- Kelly Phillips (portrayed by Hilary Salvatore) – Scott's second girlfriend and Alex's second school rival. Kelly deviously discredits Alex at every given turn, much to Alex's dismay.
- Robyn Russo (portrayed by Natanya Ross) – One of Alex and Ray's neighborhood friends. Though she possesses a sardonic sense of humor and is fun to be around, she suffers from low self-esteem and can be very depressing, sometimes expressing grim opinions of death and nihilism. Robyn often wears black and dresses more goth as the series goes on. She has a hamster named Donald that dies, sending her into an intense grieving period. Robyn eventually discovers Alex's powers in the series finale, initially not believing Louis when he tells her.
- Nicole Wilson (portrayed by Alexis Fields) – Another of Alex and Ray's friends. An opposite personality to Robyn, has a take-charge attitude and rebellious demeanor. Nicole is often involved in social justice causes, mainly environmentalism and animal rights. In season 3's episode "The Neighbor", Danielle Atron strangely sees her younger self in Nicole's idealism and goals of making the world a better place, but admits that becoming the CEO of Paradise Valley Chemical has since made her apathetic. Nicole does not appear in the final episode of the series to discover Alex's powers.
- Carlton (portrayed by Jason Marsden) – Carlton is Danielle's geeky, manipulative nephew and Annie Mack's scientific rival. Carlton attempts to sabotage Annie's project at a science fair in season 1. Vince initially believes Carlton to be the GC-161 child, but this turns out to be false. Carlton then loses the science fair to Annie and is last seen crying next to his failed project.
- Oscar – A chimpanzee that Dave buys Vince as a Christmas present; Oscar consumes an open jelly glass of GC-161 in season 2, gaining similar powers to Alex's. In season 3, he's revealed to have been adopted by Dave, living in Dave's trailer park.
- Hunter Reeves (portrayed by Will Estes) – Hunter comes to Paradise Valley with an agenda concerning the disappearance of his father in relation to GC-161. Alex finds a shrine to Danielle in his bedroom after sneaking in, but then discovers that he's actually been investigating the plant. Alex eventually kisses him and reveals her powers to him in season 4. Hunter also plays a part in helping to stop Danielle in the final episode.
- Jo (portrayed by Jennifer Manley) – Jo is a school bully who torments Alex, Ray and Robyn in several episodes throughout seasons 3–4.|
- Bryce Lester (portrayed by Josh Keaton) – Annie's longtime boyfriend throughout Season 2. Bryce and Annie go mountain-climbing, and volunteer at an amateur magic show. Eventually they break up but remain friends, leaving Annie devastated, although she does get closer to her sister afterwards.
- Nathan "Creeper" Dean (portrayed by Hank Harris) – Nathan is a shy, neurodivergent boy in Alex's film class who embarrasses Alex with a bizarre video project shown to the other students and teacher.
- Gloria (portrayed by LaReine Chabut) – Gloria is a donut shop owner at the local bakery "Wayne's Wigwam" and Alex's boss. In Season 4, Alex has a falling out with Gloria over the practice of using Styrofoam plates that damage the environment.
- Mr. Alverado (portrayed by J.D. Hall) – Ray's dad who shares Ray's passion for music.
- Gino Lawless (portrayed by Frankie Como) – Gino was a security guard at Paradise Valley Chemical. He later becomes a reoccurring government agent investigating the plant. Gino's surname was chosen ironically as he is one of the few Paradise Valley Chemical staff who has any scruples.
- Hannah Mercury (portrayed by guest star Charlotte Ayanna) – The most popular girl in Alex's school, who Ray has a crush on.
- Chester (potrayed by Jim Wise) – A local police officer who is one of Alex's acquaintances.
- Jenny (portrayed by Francesca Marie Smith) – Jenny is an insecure younger girl who idolizes Alex, to the point of being extremely annoying and manipulative. She bullies another girl by calling her "bubblebutt", after which Alex tries to get Jenny to behave better and appreciate the friends she has.
- Gordon "Scooter" Kramer (portrayed by Corey Joshua Taylor) – Scooter is George Mack's work colleague and a supporting character throughout seasons 3-4.
- Coach Rooney (portrayed by Glenn Morshower) – A loud sports coach and gym teacher with military-like behavior. Coach Rooney appears in all seasons of the series.

== Episodes ==
Season	Episodes	Originally released	
Season	Episodes	First released	Last released
1	13	October 8, 1994	February 4, 1995
2	20	October 14, 1995	September 28, 1996
3	25	October 5, 1996	March 4, 1997
4	20	September 23, 1997	January 15, 1998

== Production ==
Thomas W. Lynch, who had created the programs Night Tracks and Kids Incorporated, said the idea for the series was based on an incident from his own childhood. Lynch's father, a nuclear physicist, worked with radioactive material in the family's garage and the chemical spilled out of its container. Lynch said, "Today, they would've shut the whole block down. It cracked me up—the idea that that stuff was right there. What if I ate it? What would happen to me?" For the fictional chemical GC-161 in the show, Lynch said he came up with the GC part of the name while doing DNA research, while the 161 came from the number eight.

Though the character of Alex Mack was initially conceived as a boy, Nickelodeon had the writers change the character to a girl.

The series was filmed in Valencia, Santa Clarita and the Santa Clarita Valley. The Mack home and Paradise Valley Chemical Plant interiors were filmed in a converted warehouse used as a soundstage. The junior high scenes were filmed at Charles Helmers and James Foster Elementary Schools. Castaic Middle School was used for senior high scenes. The house, used for exterior shots, is located in the Westford Place neighborhood of Valencia.

Near the end of the series' run, Lynch presented star Larisa Oleynik with a package deal that included a fifth season of the show and a feature film, but Oleynik turned the deal down. Said Oleynik, "I have absolutely no regrets about that. It was an incredible thing he was offering me and I knew that at the time, but I was a little burnt out."

== Television airing ==
The show premiered on Nickelodeon (part of SNICK line-up) in 1994 and ended in 1998. Internationally, it also aired on YTV in Canada, Kabel 1 in Germany, SVT in Sweden, France 2 in France, Viasat 3 in Hungary, Rai 1 in Italy, Fox Kids in Latin America, Channel 4 in the UK, NHK in Japan and was in the children's weekday lineup for much of the mid-to-late 1990s on the ABC in Australia. Repeats of the show aired in 2003 on The N, but it was soon replaced there. The show aired occasionally on TeenNick's 1990s-oriented block, The '90s Are All That.

== Cast reunion ==
The Secret World of Alex Mack 20 Year Reunion was recorded in 2018 and released as a TV movie on YouTube and Vimeo. Initially a live convention interview, the reunion featured numerous cast and crew members from the original TV series, revelations about their lives post-series, and discussions of a possible reboot or sequel. It was revealed that many of the cast members had gone on to various endeavors, with moderate success: Larisa Oleynik (Alex) had gone on to earn mainstream adult roles in shows such as 10 Things I Hate About You, while other cast members had largely left acting. Alexis Fields (Nicole) had gone on to a career in interior design, John Marzilli (Vince) had adopted a son who attended the cast reunion, and Darris Love (Ray) became involved in acting and music.

== Home media ==
A single VHS volume containing two episodes titled "In the Nick of Time" was released by Sony Wonder in the United States in 1996.

The show's first season (consisting of 13 episodes on two discs) was released by Genius Entertainment on DVD format on October 2, 2007. The set is noteworthy for giving Jessica Alba top billing on the package, most likely in an effort to sell more copies, even though she actually only appears in a supporting role, and only in a few episodes. This was then released in Region 2 on April 2, 2012, and in Region 4 on June 6, 2012.

The first and second seasons are available through Amazon.com's Instant Video section, through iTunes and on Paramount+.

Mill Creek Entertainment released the complete series on DVD for the very first time on August 1, 2017.

=== DVD boxed set controversy ===
The UK release of the series' DVD boxed set received a rating of '15' from the British Board of Film Classification (BBFC), a rating considered restrictive, particularly since the series was initially aimed at preteens. It was eventually revealed by the BBFC that the '15' rating was applied to the boxed set because of a season 1 episode called "Annie Bails" where Alex is seen climbing into a clothesdryer. According to the BBFC, "The presentation of this behaviour is comic and no negative consequences are shown which would warn young viewers of the potential dangers of hiding in such appliances. While fatal incidents of children trapped in washing machines or fridges are rare, there remains sufficient cause for serious concern. The distributor indicated that they would be happy to accept a higher certificate rather than cutting the episode. The TV series is rather dated and would not have much appeal to a young audience when compared to current children's TV programmes. In addition, as the work was being targeted at an adult 'nostalgia' market, children would not be the natural audience."

== Book series ==
A book series aimed at young readers was released along with the series. The first and last books of the series are novelizations of the first and last episodes, respectively. The rest of the series consists of completely original stories, tied into the main series through the mentioning of various plot points from the TV episodes. There were 34 books in total, all released as mass-market paperbacks from Simon & Schuster. Authors Diana G. Gallagher and Cathy East Dubowski were the predominant authors of the series, although other authors were recruited in-between to write certain titles.

The following titles were included in the series (in order, published between the years 1995 to 1998; note that the exclamation point at the end of each title was a stylized and intentional punctuation):

1. Alex, You're Glowing! by Diana G. Gallagher
2. Bet You Can't! by Diana G. Gallagher
3. Bad News Babysitting! by Ken Lipman
4. Witch Hunt! by Diana G. Gallagher
5. Mistaken Identity! by Diana G. Gallagher
6. Cleanup Catastrophe! by Cathy East Dubowski
7. Take A Hike! by Cathy East Dubowski
8. Go For the Gold! by Diana G. Gallagher
9. Poison In Paradise! by Diana G. Gallagher
10. Zappy Holidays! by Diana G. Gallagher
11. Junkyard Jitters! by Patricia Barnes-Svarney
12. Frozen Stiff! by Diana G. Gallagher
13. I Spy! by John Peel
14. High Flyer! by Patricia Barnes-Svarney
15. Milady Alex! by Diana G. Gallagher
16. Father-Daughter Disaster! by Clayton Emery
17. Bonjour, Alex! by Cathy East Dubowski
18. Hocus Pocus! by "Joseph Locke" (pseudonym of Ray Garton)
19. Close Encounters! by David Cody Weiss
20. Halloween Invaders! by John Vornholdt
21. Truth Trap! by Cathy East Dubowski
22. New Years' Revolution! by Diana G. Gallagher
23. Lost in Vegas! by John Peel
24. Computer Crunch! by Patricia Barnes-Svarney
25. In Hot Pursuit! by Mel Odom
26. Canine Caper! by Diana G. Gallagher
27. Civil War in Paradise! by Bonnie D. Stone
28. Pool Party Panic! by V.E. Mitchell
29. Sink Or Swim! by Cathy East Dubowski
30. Gold Rush Fever! by Diana G. Gallagher
31. New York Nightmare! by Erica Pass
32. Haunted House Hijinks! by John Vornholdt
33. Lights, Camera, Action! by Ray Garton
34. Paradise Lost, Paradise Regained! by Diana G. Gallagher
- Zappy Holidays!, New Years' Revolution! and Paradise Lost, Paradise Regained! were marketed as "Super Editions", having more pages than the shorter remaining books in the series. Zappy Holidays!, in addition, came with an inserted page of pop-out cardstock holiday ornaments, themed on The Secret World of Alex Mack, which the book's buyers could detach and hang on their Christmas trees at home. All 34 books have been out of print since the 1990s, although second-hand copies continue to circulate.
