= Christopher Titus =

American comedian and actor (born 1964)

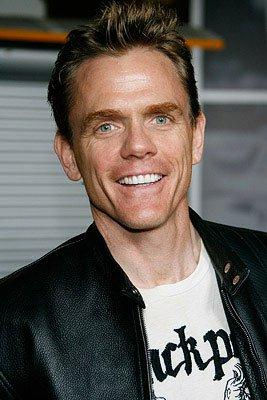
- Titus in 2010
- Born: October 1, 1964 (age 62); Castro Valley, California, U.S.
- Occupations: Comedian; actor
- Years active: 1984–present
- Spouses: Erin Carden (m. 1991; div. 2006); Rachel Bradley (m. 2013)
- Children: 2
- Website: www.christophertitus.com

Christopher Titus (born October 1, 1964) is an American comedian, podcaster, and actor. He was the star, executive producer, and co-creator of the eponymous Titus sitcom on FOX from 2000 to 2002. His life experience with a dysfunctional family is a common topic of his stand-up comedy.

== Early and personal life ==
Titus was born in Castro Valley, California. His parents divorced when he was young, and Titus went to live with his father, who struggled with alcoholism. He later lived with his mother, then his grandparents, before again living with his father from age twelve. His mother died by suicide in 1994.

Titus married Erin Carden in 1991; they had two children before divorcing in 2006.

== Career ==
=== Stand-up comedy ===
==== Norman Rockwell is Bleeding ====
As Titus's first special, this monologue was the basis for his TV show and centered around his dysfunctional family experiences. It aired in 2000 at the Montreal Just for Laughs festival; a filmed version was aired on Comedy Central in 2004.

==== 5th Annual End of the World Tour ====
This special was filmed in Miami January 7, 2007, for Comedy Central. It deals with Titus' struggle to raise his two kids in the wake of 9/11, while also addressing the death of his father, his subsequent funeral, and Titus' fulfillment of his last wishes.

==== Love is Evol ====
Love is Evol is centered around his divorce from Erin (renamed "Kate" in the special for legal reasons), who he stated was turned into "a demon slithering from the fiery depths of Satan's anus" during the divorce proceedings. In it, he recounted his perspective on how his marriage to Erin fell apart, the ensuing divorce, his analysis of why people stay in bad relationships, his crisis of faith because of the divorce, meeting his new girlfriend's family, and dating again for the first time in two decades. It was recorded in October 2008 for Comedy Central and aired on February 14, 2009.

==== Neverlution ====
Titus's fourth stand-up act, filmed in San Diego, was Neverlution In it, Titus talked about bringing the country back to its former glory, the new generation, and politics. Comedy Central Records released a double CD of Neverlution.

==== Voice in My Head ====
Titus's fifth stand-up act is called Voice in My Head. This act deals with the different levels of failure and success Titus has encountered throughout his life, including his first job as a low-rent Darth Vader look-alike, up to why his TV show was cancelled. It was filmed on January 26, 2013, at the Fresno Tower Theatre.

==== Angry Pursuit of Happiness ====
Titus's sixth act was called Angry Pursuit of Happiness which was filmed on September 27, 2014 in Santa Barbara.

==== Born with a Defect ====
This is his seventh special and was filmed in Center Theater in Escondido, California, and was released in 2016.

==== Amerigeddon ====
Titus's eighth act was released in 2018 and dealt with America under the Trump administration.

==== Zero Side Effects ====
Released in April 2023, and filmed at the historic El Portal Theater in North Hollywood, CA, this performance focused on topics including white supremacy, apologies to Millennials and Gen Z, and experiences with dental correction and surgery.

==== Carrying Monsters ====
Titus's tenth act toured the USA through at least March 30, 2024.

Christopher talks about growing up in San Fernando Valley and dealing with the Los Angeles County Courthouse, Family Court, first as a kid and then as a parent.

==== Doomed To Repeat ====
Titus's eleventh act premiered in February 2025 and is scheduled to tour the USA through the year until the end of November.

=== Podcast ===
Since January 28, 2011, Christopher Titus has been co-hosting the self-titled Christopher Titus Podcast with his wife Bombshell Rae (Rachel Bradley). Stuntman Tommy was a co-host until October 2012. "Nerdpunk" Jeff Fox had a co-hosting stint until leaving in January 2014. Rapper Ken "the Highlander" Hylind is the current co-host.

== Filmography ==
=== Film ===
Year	Title	Role	Notes
1988	Killer Klowns from Outer Space	Bob McReed	Credited as Chris Titus
1996	Crash Dive	Dent	
2007	Scar	Jeff	
2008	Remarkable Power	JP Zahn	
2012	Bad Parents	Nick	
2017	Special Unit	Garrett Fowler	Also director, executive producer and writer

=== Television ===
Year	Title	Role	Notes
1989	21 Jump Street	Jack Archer	Episode: "Woolly Bullies"
1989	Columbo	Paramilitary Man No. 1	Episode: "Grand Deceptions"
1996	Lois & Clark: The New Adventures of Superman	State Trooper	Episode: "Dead Lois Walking"
1997	Deep Family Secrets	Cowboy No. 1	Television film
1997	Union Square	Guy	Episode: "Michael's First Stand"
1998	Jenny	Surf Guy	Episode: "A Girl's Gotta Get It"
1998	Prey	Marksman	Episode: "Discovery"
1998	Damon	Murphy	Episode: "The Apartment"
1998	Beyond Belief: Fact or Fiction	Greg Hanson - The Farmer	Episode: "The Motorcycle"
2000	Who's Watching Who?	Starring	Television film
2000–2002	Titus	Christopher Titus	Also executive producer and writer 54 episodes
2002	The Twilight Zone	Gabe O'Brien	Episode: "Gabe's Story"
2003	Yes, Dear	Brian	Episode: "When Jimmy Met Greggy"
2003	Future Tense	John Chase	Television film
2006	Special Unit	Garrett Fowler	Also executive producer and writer Television pilot
2007–2008	Big Shots	Brody Johns	11 episodes
2011	CSI: Miami	Trevor Mason	Episode: "Caged"
2014	Pawnography	Host	30 episodes
2015	The Exes	Officer Burke	Episode: "Requiem for a Dream"
2015	Rizzoli & Isles	Jerry Jankowski	Episode: "Gumshoe"
2015	Finding Carter	Detective Dougherty	Episode: "The Corrections"
2018	We're Not Friends	Vic	Episode: "Don Sucks"
2020	Titus 20th Anniversary	Christopher Titus	Unofficial web special, 1 episode

== Discography ==
- Norman Rockwell is Bleeding (2004) Comedy Central Records
- The Fifth Annual End of The World Tour (2007) Comedy Central Records
- Love Is Evol (2009) Comedy Central Records
- Neverlution (2011) Comedy Central Records
- Voice in My Head (2013) DVD Exclusive
- Angry Pursuit of Happiness (2015)
- Born With a Defect (2016)
- Amerigeddon (2018)
- Zero Side Effects (2022)
- Carrying Monsters (2024)
- Doomed to Repeat (2025)
