= Jerry Grant (composer) =

- Born: Jerome Grant; December 31, 1936 (age 89); Detroit, Michigan, US
- Occupations: Film and television music score/theme composer, musical arranger, jazz musician
- Years active: 1971–present

Jerry Grant (born December 31, 1936) is an American film and television music score and theme composer, Musical arranger, and jazz musician.

== Early life ==
Born and raised in Detroit, Grant began his career as a jazz/rock studio musician there in Detroit, contributing to Motown Records tracks, while composing and performing in the concert medium. He attended Wayne State University where he received a B.S. degree in music, and subsequently attended the Detroit Institute of Musical Arts for graduate study. He then attended USC for graduate study and received a master's degree in composition at CSU Northridge. Private study on Saxophone and Flute for 6 yrs with Larry Teal, 5 years of private study with George Tremblay in composition, 2 yrs. of private study in composition with Ruth Wylie and 1 yr. of private study in conducting with Lawrence Christensen round out his music training.

While serving in the U.S. Army, Jerry was chosen for the faculty at the band training school. Entering the All Army entertainment contest, he became a finalist with his co-led jazz group. From there, he was chosen to be musical director and arranger for the Rolling Along Show, a 25-member variety review which toured the world entertaining military personnel. Relocating to Los Angeles, he became a studio performing musician on saxophone and flute and began vocal, string and horn arranging for records as well as songwriting, landing a contract at ABC Records. He organized, conducted and composed the library for the 12-piece symphonic jazz/fusion group Spectrum for 10 years, from 1971 to 1981, performing concerts in the Los Angeles area. A review in Variety called it, "exciting, moody and pulsating, laced with dramatic images." Pete Carpenter heard the group and enlisted him to begin composing as part of a team consisting of him, Grant and fellow TV and film score composer Mike Post, which lasted for another nine years.

== Career ==
Composer/Conductor Jerry Grant spans the music world as a creator of music for television and film, with works for Chorus and Chorus with Ensembles, Chorus with Electronics, Jazz Orchestra, Chamber Ensembles, Symphony Orchestra and Wind Ensemble. He blends jazz, symphonic and dramatic influences into an eclectic style that speaks with compelling imagery. Having had a career in film composition since 1978, Jerry has scored and supervised or conducted over 500 episodes of television film and features.

Grant composed music for films and television during the 1980s and 1990s. Asides from his work with his own band, Spectrum, he also composed and arranged for a new 13 piece jazz orchestra he formed, Nujazz Alternative from 1998 to 2005, recording the album, Rush Hour: Jerry Grant and the L.A Nujazz Alternative.

Grant's film score composing credits include the films Ninja Academy (1988), Bloodstone (1988), Darkroom (1988), Hired to Kill (1990), World of Valor (1992), The Secret World of Alex Mack, The Naked Truth (1992), and In the Cold of the Night (1990). His TV series composing credits include Quantum Leap, Hunter, Magnum P.I., The A-Team, Hardcastle and McCormick, Riptide, Wiseguy, and more recently, Bonkers, and the animated series Darkwing Duck.

Plus Discovery Channel's World of Valor.
