= Hired to Kill =

Hired to Kill may refer to:

- The Italian Connection, a 1972 Italian film also released under the title 'Hard to Kill'
- Hired to Kill (1990 film), a 1990 action film
