= Y: A Musical Cabaret =

British stage musical

- Genre: Musical theatre/cabaret
- Date of premiere: 27 June 1983
- Final show: 28 July 1984
- Location: Piccadilly Theatre, London

Creative team
- Director: Jean Marie Riviére
- Composer: Frédéric Botton
- Composer: Robert Purvis
- Designer: Pierre Simonini
- Choreographer: Molly Molloy

Y: A Musical Cabaret was a musical review starring quick-change artist Arturo Brachetti which ran at the Piccadilly Theatre from 27 June 1983 to 28 July 1984. The show was set in the style of a Paris cabaret complete with topless dancers (female and male), illusion, visual effects, dancing and song.

== Development ==
The show started as "I"' and was scheduled to preview on 16 March 1983 as the most expensive show ever mounted in the West End, but was withdrawn the night before. It had been due to open on 22 March 1983. After substantial rewrites and development, the show reopened as "Y" and ran for over a year.

The Piccadilly Theatre was remodelled to accommodate kitchens for audience members in the stalls where the seats were replaced by dining tables. Some of the waiting staff would also participate in selected moments of the show. A three-course meal and the show was £25 in the stalls

== Public perception ==
Reviews were mixed for the show. Martin Walker of The Guardian wrote:

"Y is so luridly and brashly vulgar that it tramples aside any quibbles about taste or artistic fitness or the lunatic profligacy that spent a reputed £2 million to bring this Parisian cabaret to the London stage"

John Barber in The Daily Telegraph wrote:

"Late nighters will welcome an attractive new theatre restaurant in London and will find "Y" slick and showy enough to make late" Talk of The Town" revues look pretty antediluvian".

Robert Cushman in The Observer wrote:

"Y the long cursed spectacular that has finally opened at the Piccadilly, now transformed into a rather taking dinner-theatre, complete with performing waiters"

Francis King in The Sunday Telegraph observed:

"Unfortunately, the performers spend much of their time miming, like drag artists on an off-night at the Vauxhall Tavern, to deafening tapes"

== Marketing ==
Y opened for previews on June 9, 1983, the day of the General Election and this was used in the initial marketing of the show.

On Independence Day, July 4, 1983, a free bottle of champagne was offered to any Americans who could show their passport.

New Year's Eve 1983 was marketed as a "Fancy Dress Ball with Russian Extravaganza". A special "Ballet Russes" number was written and performed especially for the evening performance. The theatre was licensed until 3am and breakfast was served until 4am on New Year's Day

== Closure ==
On Friday July 13, 1984, it was reported that Y was to close, "the most expensive theatrical show ever seen in London". Y closed two weeks later with losses of £4.75M.

== Musical numbers ==
Musical Numbers
Name	Cast Member(s)	Costumes	Composer
Prologue	Full Company	Pierre Simonini	Frédéric Botton
Paris Piccadilly	The Waiters	Caroline Robho	Frédéric Botton
Tribute To The Stars	Tracy Cullen, Adrain Richard Swerhun, Fiona Lewis, Gillian Winn, Bunty Bailey	Roberto Rosello	Frédéric Botton
Cabaret De Paris	Miranda Coe, Claire Lutter, Adrian Swerhun, Suzie Casabianca, Gilian Wunn, Caroline Roboh, Tracy Cullen, Lesley Collinson, Robin James, Lynne Winslo, Fiona Lewis, Tim Ricketts, Mark Elie, Heavon Grant, Stefan Reekie, Jon Peterson, Michael Hervieu, Tony Papas, Chris Marlowe	Robert Rosello	Frédéric Botton
Dodo Dollar	Arturo Brachetti, Marc Lincoln, Caron Cardelle	Roberto Rosello	Frédéric Botton
Presentation of The Orchestra	Tracy Cullen, Adrian Swerhun		Frédéric Botton
Venice Under The Sea	Full Company	Pierre Simonini	Frédéric Botton
Sweet Dreams	Tracy Cullen, Lynne Winslo, Tony Papas, Adrian Swerhun		Eurythmics
Horror Story	Arturo Brachetti, Norbert Dingo, Caroline Roboh, Tim Ricketts, Caron Cardelle, Fiona Lewis, Bunty Bailey, Lesley Collinson, Michael Hervieu, Stefan Reekie		Frédéric Botton
Ostriches	Stefan Reekie, Adrian Swerhun	Pierre Simonini	Frédéric Botton
Illusions	Nicola Kimber	Pierre Simonini	Robert Purvis
Eye	Arturo Brachetti	Pierre Simonini	Frédéric Botton
Gentleman	Tracy Cullen, Heavon Grant, Adrian Swerhun, Jon Peterson, Michael Hervieu	Pierre Simonini	Frédéric Botton
Tigers	Stefan Reekie, Lesley Collins, Bunty Bailey, Miranda Coe, Robin James, Claire Lutter, Suzie Casabianca, Stefan Reekie	Roberto Rosello, Pierre Simonin	Frédéric Botton, Robert Purvis
The Flight	Arturo Brachetti	Pierre Simonini	Robert Purvis
Zubadia	Caroline Roboh, Adrian Swerhun, Heaven Grant, Chris Marlow, Jon Peterson	Roberto Rosello, Pierre Simonini	Frédéric Botton
Running Wild	Tracy Cullen, Tim Ricketts, Jon Peterson, Orchestra		Frédéric Botton
The Grand Piano	Full Company	Roberto Rosello	Frédéric Botton
Applaudissez	Full Company		Frédéric Botton

== Creative team ==
Creative Team
Name	Role
Jean Marie Riviere	Theatre director
Pierre Simonini	Designer
Molly Molloy	Choreographer
Frédéric Botton	Composer
Roberto Roselllo	Costume Designer
Jenny Cane	Lighting Designer
Jean Daniel Mercer	Musical Arranger
Robert Purvis	Musical Director and Composer
Tim Spain Ricketts	Assistant Choreographer
Patricia Tomlinson	Ballet Mistress
Paco	Assistant Director
Caroline Roboh	Artistic Supervision
Michael White	London Production Consultant
David Astor	London Consultant
Vladimir Forgency	Producer

== Production staff ==
Production Staff
Name	Role
Jane Rees	Company Manager
Howard Harrison	Stage Manager
Jonathan Baylis	Deputy Stage Manager
Peter Bouchier	Assistant Stage Manager
Marc Lincoln	Assistant Stage Manager
Peter Litten	Production Manager
George Dugdale	Assistant Production Manager
Helen Molchanoff	Interpreter
Geoff Sharpe	Costume Supervisor
Denise Monti-Colombi	Costume Supervisor
Sean Casey	Wardrobe Master
Enza Dormizzi	Wardrobe Assistant
Kate Elliott	Wardrobe Assistant
Yvonne Savage	Wig Supervisor
Sue Strothers	Deputy Wig Supervisor

== Orchestra ==
Orchestra
Name	Instrument(s)
Robert Purvis	Piano and Musical Director
Steve Melling	Keyboards
Geoff Young	Woodwind
Duncan Smith	Trumpet
Mike Smith	Trombone
Bobby Patrick	Bass Guitar
Paul Donnelly	Guitar
Peter Buchan	Percussion
Porter Young Management	Orchestral Management
