= Marjean Holden =

American actress

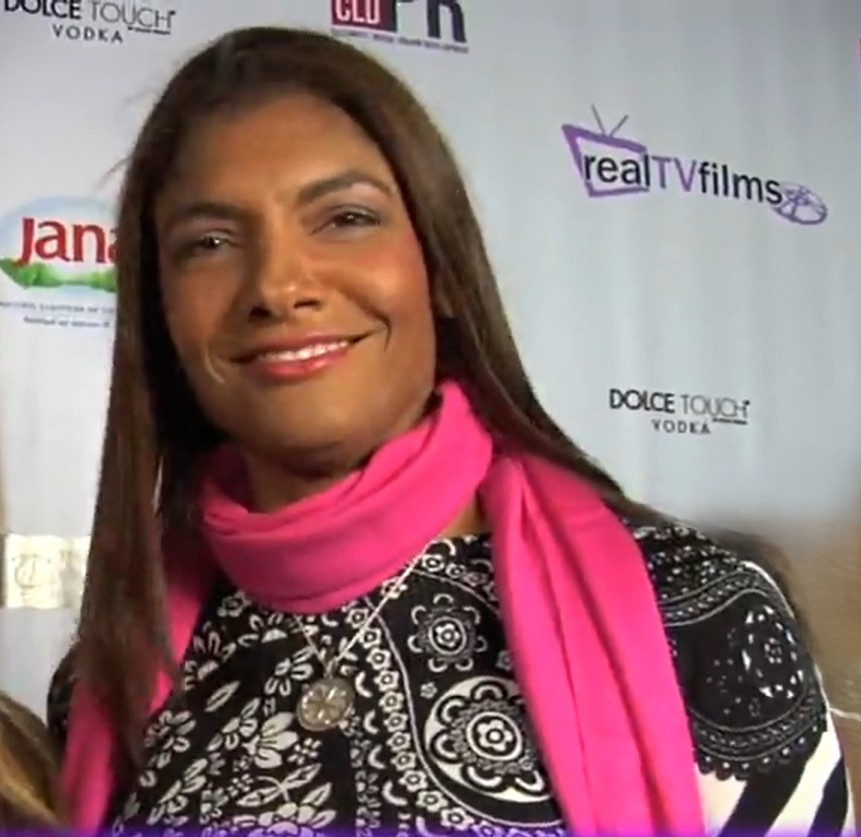
- Born: Margaret Jean Holden; November 3, 1964 (age 62); Minneapolis, Minnesota, U.S.
- Occupations: Actress, stuntwoman, martial artist, author, director
- Years active: 1985–present
- Spouse: Anton Knezevich

Marjean Holden (born Margaret Jean Holden; November 3, 1964) is an American actress, stuntwoman, martial artist, author and director.

== Early life and education ==
Born in Minneapolis, Minnesota and raised in Vail, Colorado, Holden attended Battle Mountain High School, where she was a hitter on the volleyball team. She attended Northern Arizona University, where she had a volleyball scholarship, and Arizona State University.

== Career ==
Holden made her professional acting debut in 1989 in the feature film Bill & Ted's Excellent Adventure. She has guest-starred in JAG, Tales from the Crypt, Star Trek: Deep Space Nine, La Femme Nikita, The Fresh Prince of Bel-Air, Suddenly Susan, and The Steve Harvey Show.

She was featured in Steven Spielberg's The Lost World and Jan de Bont's Speed 2: Cruise Control, as well as other films including Philadelphia Experiment II as Jess after Courteney Cox bowed out of the role.

Holden is known for such television roles as Arina in the adventure series BeastMaster. Holden played a role as an Earthforce navigator on board the Excalibur, in the Babylon 5 movie Babylon 5: A Call to Arms.

In the short-lived Babylon 5 spin-off television series Crusade she served as Chief Medical Officer Dr. Sarah Chambers on the same ship. She appeared as Sheeva in the film Mortal Kombat Annihilation, and starred as Jesse Gavin, an undercover cop specializing in martial arts alongside Cory Everson in Ballistic (1995).

In 2023, it was announced that Holden was making her feature film directorial debut. The project will be centered around a group of veteran police officers who go undercover as an '80s rock band to stop a drug kingpin.

== Personal life ==
Outside of the world of film and television, Holden has worked with combat veterans, and received an award from the Military Order of the Purple Heart in 1996 for "caring about combat-wounded veterans and veterans as a whole". In 1998 she married writer Anton Knezevich, and they have one daughter together.

== Filmography ==
=== Film ===
Year	Title	Role	Notes
1985	The Click	Voodoo Priestess (uncredited)	
1988	Bloodstone	Shirley	
1988	Glitch!	Kathy	
1989	Stripped to Kill II: Live Girls	Something Else	
1989	Bill & Ted's Excellent Adventure	Student Speaker	
1989	Dr. Caligari	Patient In Bed	
1990	Secret Agent OO Soul	Limousine Driver	
1990	Silent Night, Deadly Night 4: Initiation	Jane	Video
1992	Sweet Justice	M.J.	
1992	Stop! Or My Mom Will Shoot	Stewardess	
1992	Nemesis	Sam	
1993	Philadelphia Experiment II	Jess	
1995	Ballistic	Detective Jesse Gavin	
1995	Automatic	Epsilon Leader	
1997	The Lost World: Jurassic Park	Screamer	
1997	Mortal Kombat Annihilation	Sheeva, Shao Kahn's General	
1998	Vampires	Female Master #6	
1998	Thursday	Pregnant Woman	
2001	Ghosts of Mars	Young Woman	
2003	George of the Jungle 2	Sally	Video
2005	Hostage	Officer Carol Flores	
2010	Bring Me the Head of Lance Henriksen	Marjean	
2020	Pheromone: Providence		Short film Also director

=== Television ===
Year	Title	Role	Notes
1989–1990	A Different World	Nikki	Episode: "Great Expectations" and "Hillman Isn't Through with You Yet"
1990	So Proudly We Hail	Harvard Student	TV film
1990	Jake and the Fatman	Sarah Fox	Episode: "You Took Advantage of Me"
1992	True Colors	Tiffany	Episode: "Half a Man"
1993	The Fresh Prince of Bel-Air	Shantay	Episode: "Bundle of Joy"
1993	Where I Live	Karen	Episode: "I Live Where?"
1993	Renegade	Lieutenant Sharon Miller / Tigress	Episodes: "Fighting Cage: Parts 1 & 2"
1994	The Sinbad Show	Gillian	Episode: "The Dog Episode"
1994	Wings	Marjean	Episode: "Exclusively Yours"
1994	One Woman's Courage	Sandra Widdoes	TV film
1994	Tales from the Crypt	Andrea Johnson	Episode: "The Pit"
1995	Pointman	Shanda	Episode: "Everything in the World"
1995	Hangin' with Mr. Cooper	Doreen	Episode: "Hero"
1995	In the House	Rogina	Episode: "Birthday Presence"
1996	JAG	Lieutenant Sanford M.D.	Episode: "The Brotherhood"
1996	Suddenly Susan	Wendy	Episode: "Hoop Dreams"
1997	Star Trek: Deep Space Nine	Stolzoff	Episode: "Empok Nor"
1997	Pacific Blue	Biggs	Episode: "Only in America"
1998	The Steve Harvey Show	Maxine	Episode: "Just My Imagination"
1999	Babylon 5: A Call to Arms	Earthforce Navigator	TV film
1999	La Femme Nikita	Aurora	Episode: "Hand to Hand"
1999	Crusade	Dr. Sarah Chambers	Main role (13 episodes)
2000–2002	BeastMaster	Arina	Recurring role (22 episodes)
2001	Code Red	Lieutenant Joyce Darwin	TV film
2009	ER	Elise Warner	Episode: "T-Minus-6"
2022	Garrison7		
