= Terminal Exposure =

- Directed by: Nico Mastorakis
- Written by: Nico Mastorakis; Roger Tweten
- Produced by: Isabelle Mastorakis; John Michaels
- Starring: Mark Hennessy; Scott King; Hope Marie Carlton; Steve Donmyer; Ted Lange; John Vernon
- Cinematography: Cliff Ralke
- Edited by: Nico Mastorakis
- Music by: Hans Zimmer
- Production company: Omega Entertainment
- Distributed by: United Film Distribution Company
- Release date: 1987
- Running time: 103 minutes
- Country: United States
- Language: English

Terminal Exposure is a 1987 American comedy film directed by Nico Mastorakis. It involves two amateur beach photographers who accidentally capture a murder on film. Searching for the only clue, a gorgeous woman with a small rose tattoo, they are drawn into an ever-deepening pool of crime and action.

== Background ==
Although the film is one of the many beach comedies that were produced in the late 1980s, Terminal Exposure is notable in that it was an early work in the career of composer Hans Zimmer who would go on to compose music for The Last Samurai, The Dark Knight, Madagascar and The Lion King among many other films.

== Music ==
In 2021, a limited edition CD of the soundtrack containing 18 tracks was produced. A number of tracks weren't included in the CD. Two of them were "Can't Stop Lovin' You" by Adrian Dodz and "No Negatives of You" by David Williams.
