= Nightmare at Noon =

1988 action horror film

- Directed by: Nico Mastorakis
- Written by: Nico Mastorakis; Kirk Ellis
- Produced by: Nico Mastorakis; Isabelle Mastorakis
- Starring: Wings Hauser; Bo Hopkins; George Kennedy; Brion James
- Cinematography: Cliff Ralke
- Edited by: Nico Mastorakis; George Rosenberg
- Music by: Stanley Myers; Hans Zimmer
- Production company: Omega Entertainment
- Distributed by: Republic Pictures Home Video
- Release date: July 29, 1988
- Running time: 96 minutes
- Country: United States
- Language: English

Nightmare at Noon, also titled Death Street USA, is a 1988 American action horror film written and directed by Nico Mastorakis, and starring Wings Hauser, Bo Hopkins, George Kennedy, and Brion James. The film was shot on-location in Moab and Arches National Park, Utah. The score was composed by Stanley Myers and Hans Zimmer.

== Plot ==
A mad albino scientist (Brion James) injects a substance into the water supply for the fictional town of Canyonland, an isolated town in rural Utah, with the help of a shadowy, unknown agency. Anybody who drinks the water eventually turns into a rabid zombie. Some visitors who recently arrived in a recreational vehicle observe the zombies. After recollecting seeing something unusual at the river as they were driving to the town, they suspect it is the water turning the towns residents crazy. They attempt in vain to warn city officials and reach the outside world for help. The escape attempts are futile as the mad scientist has severed all means to leave or communicate with the outside world. Survivors at city hall formulate a theory they are part of a test of a new bio-weapon, capable of destroying an entire nation with relative ease. The surviving towns people realize the next phase of the experiment is to incinerate the remains of the town to erase all traces of the test. By the time the Sheriff learns the water is poisoned it is too late, he has already drank. The Sheriff, in a last act of defiance before he transforms into a zombie, tries to force his way into a van the townspeople suspect is the command center, while others set fire to the van. While this cripples the experiment, the Albino is still alive. One of the visitors, Reilly (Bo Hopkins) offers to take the lead to kill the albino to atone for his past; he and the Sheriff's daughter (who is also a deputy) decide to pursue the Albino on horseback, and once outside the town radio for help, thinking horses are the only viable way out of town. A chase ensues and the albino is eventually killed after the agency's attempt to extricate him via helicopter turns into a duel. The pilot of another helicopter arrives, after hearing a distress call, and engages the Albino's helicopter. Once the situation is contained, the Sheriff's daughter and the visiting stranger contemplate a relationship as they observe the decimated town.

== Cast ==
- Wings Hauser as Ken Griffiths
- Bo Hopkins as Reilly
- George Kennedy as Sheriff Hanks
- Kimberly Beck as Cheri Griffiths
- Brion James as The Albino
- Kimberly Ross as Julia
- Neal Wheeler as Charlie
- David Christiansen as Dr. Miller
- Kim Milford as Anton
- Mark Haarman as Deputy Marks
- Jean St. James as Lori
- S.A. Griffin as Benson
