= Dolls (1987 film) =

1987 film by Stuart Gordon

- Theatrical release poster
- Directed by: Stuart Gordon
- Written by: Ed Naha
- Produced by: Charles Band; Brian Yuzna
- Starring: Stephen Lee; Guy Rolfe; Hilary Mason; Ian Patrick Williams; Carolyn Purdy-Gordon; Cassie Stuart; Bunty Bailey; Carrie Lorraine
- Cinematography: Mac Ahlberg
- Edited by: Lee Percy
- Music by: Fuzzbee Morse; Victor Spiegel
- Distributed by: Empire Pictures
- Release dates: April 27, 1987 (Seattle Film Festival); May 22, 1987 (Los Angeles); November 6, 1987 (New York City)
- Running time: 77 minutes
- Country: United States
- Language: English
- Budget: $1.2 million

Dolls is a 1987 American horror film directed by Stuart Gordon, written by Ed Naha, and starring Stephen Lee, Guy Rolfe, Hilary Mason, Ian Patrick Williams, and Bunty Bailey. Its plot follows six people who seek shelter during a storm in the mansion of an elderly doll maker and his wife, only to find that the various puppets and dolls in the home contain the imprisoned spirits of criminals. It was produced by Charles Band and Brian Yuzna through Band's Empire Pictures.

The film was shot in Italy at Empire Studios prior to the making of Gordon's From Beyond (1986), but went unreleased until 1987, when it premiered at the Seattle International Film Festival.

== Plot ==
A violent thunderstorm strands young Judy, her father David, and her stepmother Rosemary in the English countryside. Seeking shelter, the trio break into a nearby mansion, where they meet the owners, a kindly older couple named Gabriel and Hilary Hartwicke. Learning that Judy has "lost" her beloved stuffed bear Teddy (in fact, the cruel Rosemary threw Teddy into the bushes), Gabriel gives Judy a doll named Mr. Punch. Three more people arrive at the mansion, also seeking shelter from the storm: good-natured American businessman Ralph and English hitchhikers Isabel and Enid. Gabriel invites them all to stay the night.

Judy soon discovers that the mansion is full of beautifully detailed toys and dolls like Mr. Punch; Gabriel explains that he and his wife are toy makers. Judy is overjoyed, as is Ralph, who has never given up his fondness of toys.

Isabel and Enid are revealed to be petty thieves who hitchhiked with Ralph intending to rob him. That night, Isabel sneaks out of her room to rob the mansion. Her thievery is thwarted by dolls who attack her, brutally beating her down, and then drag her into the darkness. Judy, in the hallway, briefly sees the attack and she rushes to tell David. However, David is a neglectful and uncaring father; both he and Rosemary refuse to believe Judy, thinking she is making up stories. Instead, Judy convinces Ralph to check out the hallway with her. Ralph is initially very skeptical, but he eventually begins believing Judy after her Mr. Punch doll briefly speaks to them.

Dolls later attack Rosemary as she settles into bed. Trying to escape, she accidentally falls out of a window to her death. Enid searches for Isabel and finds her in the attic, almost entirely transformed into a doll version of herself. A horde of toys (including actual projectile shooting soldier figurines) attack and kill Enid. Meanwhile, Ralph is caught in a trap the dolls set for the other adults before Judy convinces them to save him, because he is her friend and has done nothing wrong. David discovers Rosemary's dead body placed in his bed and believes that Ralph killed her.

Judy and Ralph enter the workshop where the irate David finds them. Ralph tries to explain that the dolls attacked the others, but David refuses to listen, knocking both his daughter and Ralph unconscious. The Mr. Punch doll comes to life and attacks David. Other dolls drag the unconscious Ralph and Judy to safety as the wrathful David destroys the Mr. Punch doll.

The Hartwickes appear and explain that they are a magician couple who see toys as the heart and soul of childhood. Gabriel and Hilary dislike the bitterness of adults, and when people seek shelter at their mansion, the dolls serve as a test for the visitors. People like Ralph (who appreciates the joy of childhood) and children like Judy are spared and leave the house with a fuller appreciation of life. However, those who refuse to change their ways (like David, Rosemary, Enid, and Isabel) can never leave. As the Hartwickes explain this, the incredulous David finds himself slowly (and agonizingly) transformed into a doll to replace Mr. Punch.

The next morning, the Hartwickes convince the reawakened Ralph and Judy that the night's events were just a dream. Gabriel reads a fake letter from David explaining to Judy that he and Rosemary are changing their names and leaving the country with Enid and Isabel. Judy will be able to stay permanently with her caring mother in Boston. Judy finds Teddy in Ralph's car and gives him to Hartwickes as a present. Ralph and Judy leave the house and, as they drive away, Judy hints to him that if he would like to stay with her and her mother; that he could be Judy's new father, which he seems open to.

The film ends with dolls of David, Rosemary, Enid, and Isabel sitting on a shelf as another car of obnoxious parents and hapless children gets stuck in mud near the mansion.

== Cast ==
- Ian Patrick Williams as David Bower
- Carolyn Purdy-Gordon as Rosemary Bower
- Carrie Lorraine as Judy Bower
- Guy Rolfe as Gabriel Hartwicke
- Hilary Mason as Hilary Hartwicke
- Bunty Bailey as Isabel Prange
- Stephen Lee as Ralph Morris
- Cassie Stuart as Enid

== Production ==
Director Stuart Gordon came across Ed Naha's script for Dolls at Empire Pictures and became interested in directing it. Inspired by the book The Uses of Enchantment by Bruno Bettelheim, Gordon conceived the film as horror fairy tale in the vein of "Hansel and Gretel". According to Gordon, Empire originally had the script slated as a potential direct-to-video project, but once Gordon voiced his interest this gave Empire the confidence to position the script as a much larger production. Despite Gordon filming Dolls prior to From Beyond, Empire opted to release From Beyond first in order to capitalize on the success and recognition of Gordon's Re-Animator.

Dolls extensively uses stop motion animation by David W. Allen.

== Release ==
Dolls premiered in the United States at the Seattle International Film Festival on April 27, 1987, before opening in Los Angeles on May 22, 1987. It was released theatrically in New York City that fall, opening on November 6, 1987.

=== Critical response ===
Dolls received mixed reviews. On Rotten Tomatoes, the film has an approval rating of 63%, based on reviews from 16 critics. On Metacritic, the film has a score of 55, based on reviews from five critics, indicating "mixed or average" reviews.

Michael H. Price of the Fort Worth Star-Telegram favored the film, describing it as "a nervy mix of whimsy and jolts," praising the cinematography, performances, and special effects.

Roger Ebert's review of the film was mostly negative, commenting that Dolls lacks the energy and unapologetic excess of Stuart Gordon's two previous films. He also opined that dolls are intrinsically not frightening due to their cute appearance, writing, "The haunted house looks magnificent, but so what, if it's not haunted by great and frightening creatures? At some point Dolls remains only an idea, a concept. It doesn't become an engine to shock and involve us." He gave it two out of four stars.

Ain't It Cool News reviewed the DVD, calling it "a movie that really stands above the type of film you might expect from this era, with this subject matter." HorrorNews.net's Jeff Colebank listed the toymaking couple as one of the 13 Best Horror Movie Couples, stating that Rolfe was "the creepiest toymaker of them all". Allmovie's review of the film was mildly favorable, calling it "a serious-minded, lovingly-crafted modern fairy tale that only misses classic status by a few clumsy, low-budget moments."

=== Home media ===
Dolls was released on VHS and Laserdisc in 1988 by Vestron Video. Dolls was released to DVD by MGM Home Entertainment on September 20, 2005, as a Region 1 widescreen DVD and by the Scream Factory division of Shout! Factory (under license from MGM) on November 11, 2014, as a Region A widescreen Blu-ray. In 2023, Arrow Films released a new Blu-ray as part of a multi-film box set featuring other Empire Pictures films, entitled Enter the Video Store: Empire of Screams.

== Cancelled sequel ==
Stuart Gordon was, at one point, interested in directing a sequel to this film. The initial story would have followed Judy and Ralph back to Boston in which Ralph would have married Judy's mother and they would become a family. One day Judy would receive a box sent from England that contained the toy makers, Gabriel and Hilary, as dolls. The sequel never entered production.

== Legacy ==
In 1989, following the collapse of Empire Pictures, producer Charles Band launched a new film series at his next company, Full Moon Productions, titled Puppet Master. The series is considered a spiritual successor to Dolls and features inanimate puppets brought to life through the use of Egyptian magic. Actor Guy Rolfe appears in several of the films as the puppets’ creator and leader, André Toulon.

The doll character Mr Punch has a cameo appearance in Puppet Master II, Curse of the Puppet Master, and the Demonic Toys spin-off Baby Oopsie.

== Other media ==
Mr. Punch is available as an alternate skin for Jester in Puppet Master: The Game.

== See also ==
- Killer Toys

== Sources ==
- Gallagher, John Andrew (1989). "Stuart Gordon". Film Directors on Directing. Westport, Connecticut: Greenwood Publishing Group. ISBN 978-0-275-93272-5.
