= Island of Death =

1976 Greek horror film directed by Nico Mastorakis

- 1982 British video artwork
- Directed by: Nico Mastorakis (Note: Credited as Nick Mastorakis.)
- Written by: Nico Mastorakis
- Produced by: Nico Mastorakis; Nestoras Pavelas
- Starring: Bob Behling; Jane Lyle; Jessica Dublin; Gerard Gonalons; Jannice McConnell; Nikos Tsachiridis
- Cinematography: Nikos Gardelis (Note: Credited as Nick Gardellis.)
- Edited by: Vasilis Syropoulos
- Music by: Nikos Lavranos (Note: Credited as Nick Lavranos.)
- Production company: Omega Pictures
- Distributed by: Winstone Film Distributors (United Kingdom)
- Release dates: 24 November 1977 (London); 9 April 1976 (United States)
- Running time: 108 minutes
- Country: Greece
- Language: English
- Budget: US$30,000

Island of Death (Greek: Τα παιδιά του Διαβόλου, Ta pediá tou Diavólou, transl. Children of the Devil), also known as Devils in Mykonos and A Craving for Lust, is a 1976 English-language Greek exploitation horror film directed by Nico Mastorakis and starring Bob Behling, Jane Lyle, Jessica Dublin, Gerard Gonalons, Jannice McConnell, and Nikos Tsachiridis. Its plot follows two tourists—a young man and woman, both sexual sadists posing as newlyweds—who visit the Greek island of Mykonos and start a rampage of murder, killing anyone they believe to be sinful or perverted.

Filmed on location in 1975, Island of Death was theatrically released in the United Kingdom in late 1977 in a truncated version. It received a limited theatrical release in the United States under the title Isle of Perversion, bearing an X rating. Due to its graphic depiction of rape, murder, torture, incest, and bestiality, the film was wildly controversial and became one of the most widely banned films in the world. It was among 39 titles banned on home video in the United Kingdom during the "video nasty" panic.

Island of Death was first released fully uncut in 2003 by the American distributor Image Entertainment. Arrow Films released the uncut version again on DVD in 2010, and on Blu-ray in 2015.

== Plot ==
Christopher, an American man, and Celia, a British woman, rent a home on the Greek island of Mykonos for their purported honeymoon. The locals believe them to be a normal newlywed couple; however, Christopher and Celia are, in fact, sexual sadists and murderers and have left London to venture on a killing spree abroad.

The morning after their arrival, Christopher becomes aroused and rapes a goat and then kills it. The two then meet Jean-Claude, a French painter who is attracted to Celia. The two nail him to the ground in a crucifixion pose and pour paint down his throat until he chokes to death. They then dump his body in the ocean. While getting acquainted with the island locals, the couple meets Patricia, a wealthy older woman, and are invited to a gay wedding between a middle-aged American on the island and his Greek lover. Christopher and Celia break into the couple's house on their wedding night. Christopher chases the elderly man into the streets before stabbing him to death; Celia shoots his lover in the head with a pistol and stages it as a murder-suicide.

After this, the couple kills Foster, an American police officer who had been trailing them, by hanging him from his plane and flying it over the ocean. Celia begins to resist Christopher's murderous escapades and hesitates when he targets Patricia. He arrives at her house, and the two begin to have sex while Celia watches from a window. Christopher urinates on her and beats her unconscious before taking her body outside and decapitating her with a bulldozer. The next day, while Christopher goes fishing, two hippies attempt to rape Celia while she is taking a bath. However, Christopher returns home to discover them in the act, leading him to murder one with a speargun and drown the other in the toilet.

Christopher targets a local lesbian bartender, Leslie, who is romantically interested in Celia. Celia visits her house, and Leslie invites her to do heroin; Christopher then enters and knocks her unconscious before injecting her with a lethal dosage. After she dies, he uses an aerosol spray and a candle to burn her face.

Celia begins to dream of a mysterious man and worries that the small size of the island will lead to police suspecting her and Christopher in the string of deaths. When a local crime writer finds Leslie's body, the police begin to search for Christopher and Celia. They flee to a remote farm on the island to hide and meet a mute shepherd who turns out to be the man of whom Celia has been having premonitions. It is then revealed that Christopher and Celia are brother and sister and have been engaged in an incest relationship. The following day, the shepherd rapes Celia in the barn and then knocks Christopher unconscious before anally raping him. He then throws Christopher into a lye pit, and Celia becomes attached to the stranger. A rainstorm arrives on the island, and Christopher dies in the lye pit while Celia and the shepherd have sex.

== Cast ==
- Bob Behling as Christopher (Note: Credited as Bob Belling.)
- Jane Lyle as Celia (Note: Credited as Jane Ryale.)
- Jessica Dublin as Patricia
- Gerard Gonalons as Foster
- Jannice McConnell as Leslie (Note: Credited as Janice McConnel.)
- Nikos Tsachiridis as Shepherd
- Jeremy Rousseau as Jean-Claude
- Ray Richardson (Note: Credited as Ray Zuk.)
- Marios Tartas (Note: Credited as Mario Tatras.)
- Efi Bani (Note: Credited as Efi Banny.)
- Clay Half (Note: Credited as Clay Huff.)

== Themes ==
In the book See No Evil: Banned Films and Video Controversy (2000), writers David Kerekes and David Slater note that Island of Death contains commentary on Mastorakis' home country of Greece, particularly its strong tradition of Eastern Orthodox Christianity, "whether it's intentional or not." Kerekes and Slater write: "Christopher's attempts to clean up the streets of Mykonos parallels the country's intolerance of anything that transgresses Christian values... Christopher is repulsed by the perversions of other people and blind to his own absolute wickedness. He is actually far more corrupt than any of the characters he castigates, and the one person he believes to be pure—the farmer—is the one who is as twisted as himself." Kerekes and Slater also observe references to the Crusades, citing the "aptly named" lead character, whose name parallels Saint Christopher.

== Production ==
Mastorakis filmed Island of Death on location in Mykonos, Greece in early 1975 on a budget of US$30,000. Mastorakis described the production: "I had no money. All the people in it were amateurs. We were going up to people who looked American in the street and asking them if they could act! We shot it quickly and I did everything on it, wrote, produced, directed, photographed and edited."

== Release ==
Island of Death was distributed theatrically in the United Kingdom by Winstone Films in November 1977 under the alternate title A Craving for Lust, in a truncated cut that excised a total of eighteen minutes of footage. The film opened at London's historic Cinema Moulin on a double bill with Her Naked Flesh. The film grossed £50,901 during its month-long run in London.

Little is known about the film's distribution details in the United States. Shortly after its completion in 1975, North American distribution rights to the film were purchased by film advertiser Merwin Bloch before being passed on to Bryanston Distributing Company, a New York City-based distributor who had released several other exploitation films of the era, including Deep Throat (1972), Flesh for Frankenstein (1973), and The Texas Chain Saw Massacre (1974). After Bryanston was subject to obscenity charges and one of its executives was jailed, the distributor failed to release Island of Death. The film was scheduled to be auctioned in New York City by Cineffects Color Laboratory on 23 August 1976, but due to a legal complication, the auction never took place, resulting in the rights being reverted to its original owner, Merwin Bloch.

Despite this, the film did receive a theatrical release in Indianapolis, Indiana on 9 April 1976, under the title Isle of Perversion, bearing an X rating.

=== Home media ===
Island of Death was released on VHS in the United Kingdom by AVI Video in November 1982. It was one of 39 videocassette titles that were banned in the United Kingdom during the video nasty moral panic. The film remained banned in the United Kingdom between 1984 and 2011.

Image Entertainment released the film fully uncut on DVD in the United States on 18 February 2003. Arrow Films released a fully uncut DVD edition in the United Kingdom in September 2011. Arrow released the film on Blu-ray on 26 May 2015 in North America and the United Kingdom.

== Reception ==
A review published by Screen International gave the film moderate praise, noting it was "worthy of better" than the "sexploitation regulars" of the period, with Mastorakis "[using] the beautiful scenery of Mykonos to contrast the sunlit peace with the dark turbulence of the minds of his two leading players." Patrick Fleet of the Bristol Post also praised the film, calling it "far, far better than its title and plot make it sound, and a remarkable achievement for the Greek amateurs who made it, led by Nico Mastorakis."

AllMovie gave the film a mixed review, writing "this graphic Grecian proto-slasher is one of the most perverse exploitation films released to the public, a laundry list of outrages that will cause the viewer to wonder what kind of mind could conceive such a monstrosity."

== Sources ==
- Kerekes, David; Slater, David (2000). See No Evil: Banned Films and Video Controversy. London, England: Headpress. ISBN 978-1-900-48610-1.
- Walker, Johnny (2015). A Cruel Destination: The History and Legacy of Island of Death. Island of Death (Media notes). Arrow Films. pp. 6–17. OCLC 968216618.
