= Spellcaster (film) =

1988 American film by Rafal Zielinski

- Directed by: Rafal Zielinski
- Screenplay by: Dennis Paoli; Charles Bogel
- Story by: Ed Naha
- Produced by: Roberto Bessi
- Starring: Adam Ant; Richard Blade; Gail O'Grady; Bunty Bailey; Kim Johnston Ulrich; Traci Lind
- Cinematography: Sergio Salvati
- Edited by: Bert Glatstein
- Music by: Nathan Wang
- Production company: Empire Pictures
- Distributed by: Columbia TriStar Home Video
- Release date: May 6, 1992; (video)
- Running time: 83 minutes
- Country: United States
- Language: English

Spellcaster is a 1989 American horror film directed by Rafal Zielinski and starring Adam Ant and Bunty Bailey. Originally filmed in 1986, it premiered on television in 1989, before being eventually released to video in 1992.

== Plot ==
Orphaned siblings Jackie and Tom are elated to be chosen to participate in a treasure hunt alongside other players, for a prize of one million dollars. Set in an Italian castle owned by the mysterious Diablo, all they must do to win the contest is be the first to find the check. Also hunting for the money are several others that are highly competitive and willing to do anything to win. The contest is to be recorded for a MTV-esque music channel and sponsored by the recording company of pop star Cassandra Castle, who is to accompany the contestants throughout the hunt along with VJ Rex. Cassandra, however, is unwilling to spend any time with the contestants and prefers to spend all of her time drinking excessively in her private room. Upon a whim Cassandra makes a deal with Rex to hide the money on her person so none of the contestants can find it. Upon the end of the competition the two will split the winnings.

Once the contest begins the contestants begin a frantic search for the check, unaware of Cassandra's duplicity or that supernatural forces are picking the players off one by one. Cassandra's plans are waylaid when the forces begin to torment her and cause her to lose the check, which is carried throughout the castle on a magical breeze. Eventually only Jackie, Cassandra, and Tom are left, upon which point they are unable to ignore that something is very wrong. As Jackie frantically searches for answers she discovers a room at the top of the castle containing a crystal ball and Diablo, who reveals himself to be a demon. He also tells her that he has captured the souls of the other contestants in the sphere and will take them all to Hell, as well as that his next victim will be her brother. Meanwhile Cassandra and Tom have romantically connected with one another. He also discovers the check, which has landed near him and Cassandra. Tom is shocked when Cassandra chooses to burn the check and warns him that the money comes with strings attached that he wouldn't want. She throws the check into a fireplace, only Diablo to magically summon her to his room and chastise her for ruining his plans, revealing that Cassandra had formed a contract with him and that he will be taking her soul to Hell as well. In exchange for her soul she gained fame and wealth, which she quickly realized was not worth the bargain and took to alcohol and drugs to numb herself to her reality. In order to save both Tom and Cassandra Jackie tries to bargain with Diablo, offering her soul in exchange for the both of them. Horrified, Cassandra chooses to destroy Diablo's crystal ball, which puts an end to his evil plans and brings all of the contestants back to life. This also frees Cassandra, who reveals that she convinced Diablo to give her back her soul and to instead VJ at the music channel. The film closes with Diablo hosting a music broadcast and announcing a new contest that will bring him all new victims.

== Cast ==
- Gail O'Grady as Jackie
- Bunty Bailey as Cassandra Castle
- Harold Pruett as Tom
- Adam Ant as "Diablo"
- Richard Blade as Rex
- Kim Johnston Ulrich as Teri
- Michael Zorek as Harlan
- Martha Demson as Myrna
- Dale Wyatt as Jamie
- Traci Lind as Yvette (credited as Traci Lin)
- William Butler as Billy
- Michael Deak as Andy
- Donald Hodson as Bruno
- Marcello Modugno as Tony
- Albert Band as The Cook

== Production ==
Shooting began during July 1986, at Castello di Giove. The 12th-century castle near Rome, Italy, had recently been purchased by Spellcaster's executive producer, Charles Band, who intended to use it as a backdrop for multiple films. The script was written by Dennis Paoli and Ed Naha, who had frequently collaborated with Stuart Gordon. Band's Empire Pictures produced the movie.

== Release ==
Spellcaster was originally scheduled for an early 1987 release. In 1988, Empire Pictures ran into severe financial difficulties, and was seized by a creditor bank. The releases of Empire's remaining films, in various stages of production at the time, were delayed. Spellcaster first played on television in 1989, before eventually being released to video by Columbia TriStar in 1992.

== Reception ==
Review website Cinema Crazed rated the movie favorably, stating that it was "about as goofy an eighties horror film as it gets", and that it "is essentially like a gory, exploitative version of Willy Wonka." Variety called it an "effective if cornball monster film". MTV writer Eric Snider wrote that it was "definitely a movie that has 'MTV generation cult favorite' written all over it, next to 'clearance sale' and '$1.99'."
