= Bloodstone (1988 film) =

1988 film by Dwight H. Little

- Theatrical release poster
- Directed by: Dwight H. Little
- Written by: Nico Mastorakis
- Produced by: Ashok Amritraj; Sunanda Murali Manohar
- Starring: Rajinikanth; Brett Stimely; Anna Nicholas
- Cinematography: Eric Anderson
- Edited by: Nico Mastorakis; Nancy Morrison
- Music by: Jerry Grant
- Distributed by: Omega Entertainment
- Release date: October 7, 1988
- Running time: 87 minutes
- Countries: United States; India
- Language: English
- Budget: $1.5 million
- Box office: $5 million

Bloodstone is a 1988 action-adventure film produced by Ashok Amritraj and Sunanda Murali Manohar, directed by Dwight H. Little and written by Nico Mastorakis. Starring Rajinikanth, Brett Stimely and Anna Nicholas, the film was shot primarily in India. The story revolves around a mythical ruby called the "bloodstone".

The film was dubbed and released in Tamil as Vairavel.

The film is notable for being Indian actor Rajinikanth's only foreign film.

== Plot ==
In 12th Century India, a huge ruby was bestowed with the power of good and the curse of evil by the spilt blood of Princess Lafla. In the 18th Century, the British stole it. In today's India, small-time crook Paul Lorre steals the stone back. While attempting delivery to international fence Ludwig Van Hoeven, he realizes the authorities are onto him and slips the priceless gem into the baggage of the unsuspecting Sandy and Stephanie McVey. Lorre manages to indicate the taxi driver Shyam Sabu to Van Hoeven's thugs. Sabu realizes that he is being followed, but he does not see the huge ruby fall into a crevice inside his trunk while dropping Sandy and Stephanie at their hotel. Soon Sandy and Sabu are both in action; Sandy in a brutal fight with two thieves ransacking his room and Sabu in a life-or-death car chase and shootout.

Stephanie gets kidnapped by Van Hoeven's thugs. Van Hoeven contacts Sandy and proposes Stephanie in exchange for the gem at the waterfalls on the road to Bangalore. Without the ruby, Sandy has no option but the police, but Sabu produces the stone, igniting a vicious fight between the two equally matched men, ending in a second agreement. Sandy will pay well, but the ruby is his to exchange for Stephanie's life. They prepare for a conflict while Sabu lets his Indian friends know that their help may be needed. At every corner, the bungling Ramesh is attempting to keep up with the furious pace, always managing somehow to fail. Sandy and Sabu are ambushed while exiting the rain forests but survive the shootout and capture two of Van Hoeven's men, learning of the lone secret passage before tossing Misba is super them over the waterfalls.

Van Hoeven is giving a festive, lavish party. But Sandy and Sabu have penetrated the palace with plans of their own, when they... drop unexpectedly. The ruby proves to be a fake and they are moments from execution when Sabu's friends storm the fortress and a bloody mêlée ensues. Sandy, Stephanie and Sabu escape directly into the gun barrels of Ramesh's men. They are clean, Van Hoeven and Misba is arrested and Inspector Ramesh is a hero... but the Bloodstone is still missing.

== Cast ==
- Rajinikanth as Shyam Sabu
- Brett Stimely as Sandy McVey
- Anna Nicholas as Stephanie
- Charlie Brill as Inspector Ramesh
- Jack Kehler as Paul Lorre
- Christopher Neame as Van Hoeven
- Tej Sapru as Manu
- Bob Christo as Haggerty
- Deep Dhillon as Tanjeer
- Carol Teasdale as Anna
- Laura Albert as Kim Chi
- Marjean Holden as Shirley
- Dhanushkodi as Maniam

== Production ==
The film was mainly shot in Bangalore. According to an interview with director Dwight Little, the film's producer, Nico Mastorakis, was set to direct the film himself. For reasons unknown, Mastorakis couldn't go to India himself, so he started looking around for a non-union director who had experience with action. Because Little had just made the action film Getting Even, he was hired. Little explained he had a thirty-five day schedule, but was still filming at day seventy-eight. Because Mastorakis had insufficient budget to hire SAG-actors, Brett Stimely and Anna Nicholas were hired. "You can’t really have non-union actors play the lead in a movie like this. It’s asking too much", explained Little. He added that he thought Rajinikanth was "amazing". Rajinikanth was not fluent in English at the time of casting, and took training for a week from a tutor from the American Consulate.

After finishing a rough cut of the film, Little and Mastorakis had creative differences, with Mastorakis finalising the film and Little not involved in the final cut.
