= Richard Blade =

British American radio and television personality (born 1956)

- Born: Richard Thomas Sheppard; May 23, 1956 (age 70); Torquay, England
- Other names: The Young Dick Sheppard; Disco Dick
- Education: Oxford University
- Occupations: Television presenter; radio personality; DJ
- Years active: 1974–present
- Known for: Girls Just Want to Have Fun; 1st Wave Radio; KROQ-FM; The Lockdown Interviews
- Spouse: Krista (m. 2000)
- Awards: Hollywood Walk of Fame 2024

Richard Blade (born Richard Thomas Sheppard; May 23, 1956, in Bristol, England) is a British-American Los Angeles–based radio, television and film personality from Torquay, England. He is best known for his radio programs that feature new wave and popular music from the 1980s. He was a disc jockey at KROQ-FM in Los Angeles from 1982 to 2000 and has been a host for SiriusXM's 1st Wave classic alternative station since 2005.

== Biography ==
Richard Thomas Sheppard attended Oxford University, graduating in 1974 and worked as a club DJ known as "The Young Dick Sheppard" in the United Kingdom and Europe. He moved to the United States in 1976 where he continued his work as a club DJ and served as a party DJ for celebrities in Los Angeles. He began his radio career in 1980, initially working for stations in Bakersfield, San Luis Obispo and Long Beach before joining KROQ-FM in 1982. He took a new name from the science fiction film Blade Runner (1982). Within a few months of working in Los Angeles, Blade had become the No. 1 Arbitron-rated radio personality on the West Coast and in 1982, he began to host a daily television program on KCAL-TV, back then known as KHJ-TV called MV3, which later became Video One.

In 1984, he created, produced and hosted VideoBeat for KTLA. The weekly series ran for two years. Between 1991 and 2003, Blade hosted several music-related television programs, including America's Top 10, which he took over from Casey Kasem and audio music programs for in-flight entertainment produced by Sony Transcom. He hosted several "Flashback" radio programs on KROQ-FM, and was a frequent host at Los Angeles dance clubs on their KROQ Nights, including the famous Palace Theatre, Hollywood. He appeared on the cover of a six-volume set of 1980s music compilations called Richard Blade's Flashback Favorites.

In 2000, he wrote the second-season finale for the UPN science fiction television series Seven Days, titled "The Cure". Blade left KROQ in 2000 after 18 years at the influential radio station and moved to St Maarten in the Caribbean, taking a two-year break from the industry to work on several writing projects.

He moved back to Los Angeles in 2002 and returned to his career in radio and television. In June 2003, he consulted for MTV Networks on the television program Bands Reunited then worked for VH1 as a writer and producer on both seasons of the series. In 2004, he returned to radio on Los Angeles station KYSR (Star 98.7), originally as host of a Saturday night "Totally 80's" program and short features in the afternoon drive-time period. In 2006 when the station became more 1990s and current-based, the Saturday night program ended.

In 2005, he left terrestrial radio and joined Sirius Satellite Radio, where he began hosting a show on 1st Wave, a 1980s new wave music channel. He can be heard on the channel weekdays from 3-9 PM eastern. Recently, Blade has taken over for Ray Rossi on The Pulse on weekends. In April 2006, he co-starred with Gabrielle Anwar and Craig Sheffer in Long Lost Son, which he wrote and shot on location in the Caribbean. It premiered on Lifetime in August 2006. Blade plays 1980s music on "Flashback Lunch" every weekday on Jack FM (KCBS-FM) in Los Angeles. His autobiography, World In My Eyes, was released in November 2017. Blade released his second book, "The Lockdown Interviews" on November 18, 2021. It reached #5 in Biographies of Pop Artists, No. 10 in Punk Music (Kindle Store), and #16 in Biographies of Rock Bands.

In 2024, Blade was presented with a star on the Hollywood Walk of Fame with the award ceremony including Billy Idol and Jimmy Kimmel as presenters.

== Film and television appearances ==
Blade appeared in such television series as Square Pegs and Hunter and appeared as a real contestant (as "Dick Sheppard") on such game shows as Win, Lose or Draw and Card Sharks, winning $2,300 on the latter.

He also appeared in several films, including Girls Just Want to Have Fun (1985), 101 (1989), Rock 'n' Roll High School Forever (1990) and Spellcaster (1991). In August 2007, Blade made an appearance on the reality show Rock of Love. He made regular cameo appearances on Glory Daze, set at a college frat house in 1986.

== Personal life ==
Blade lives in Southern California with his wife Krista, whom he wed around 2000. He became a United States citizen in 1988.
