= Len Lesser =

American character actor (1922–2011)

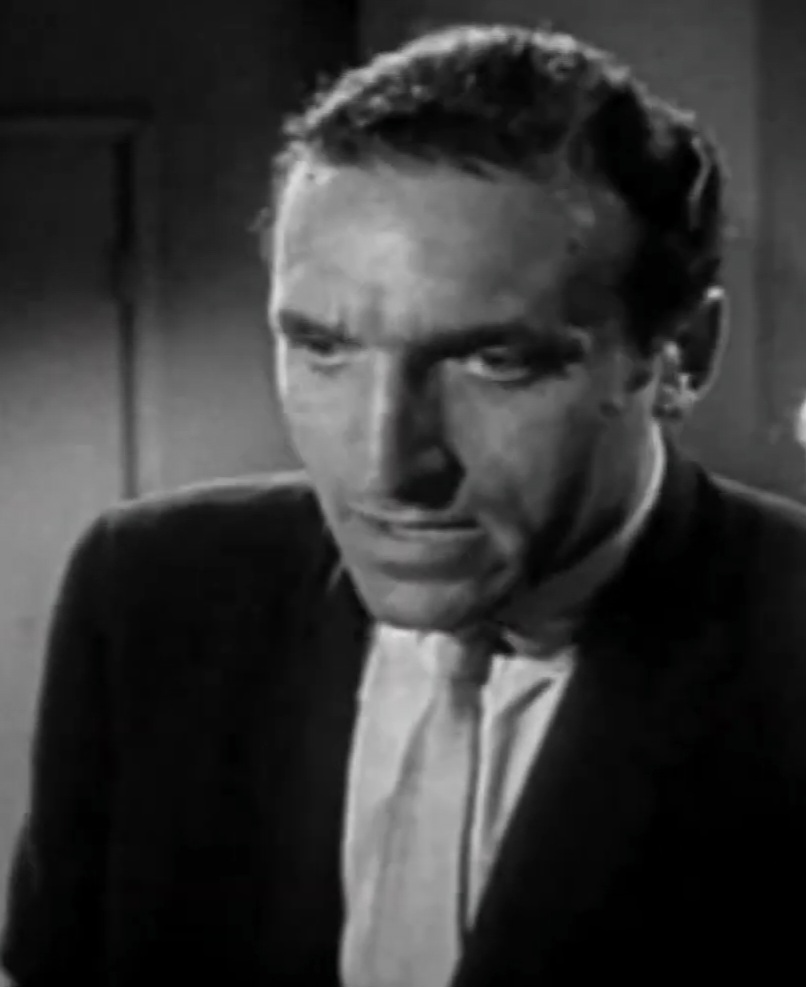
- Lesser in an episode of Lock-Up (1960)
- Born: Leonard King Lesser; December 3, 1922; The Bronx, New York, U.S.
- Died: February 16, 2011 (aged 88); Burbank, California, U.S.
- Occupation: Actor
- Years active: 1949–2011
- Spouse: Janice Burrell (m. 1954; div. 1982)
- Children: 2

Leonard King Lesser (December 3, 1922 – February 16, 2011) was an American character actor and comedian, best known for his recurring role as Uncle Leo, Jerry Seinfeld's uncle in the American sitcom television series Seinfeld. He was also known for his recurring role as Garvin on Everybody Loves Raymond.

== Early life ==
Lesser was born in New York City in 1922. His father, a grocer, was a Jewish immigrant from Poland. Lesser received his bachelor's degree from the City College of New York in 1942 at the age of 19. Lesser enlisted in the United States Army the day after the attack on Pearl Harbor, and served in the China Burma India Theater during World War II. While there, he was promoted to sergeant.

== Career ==
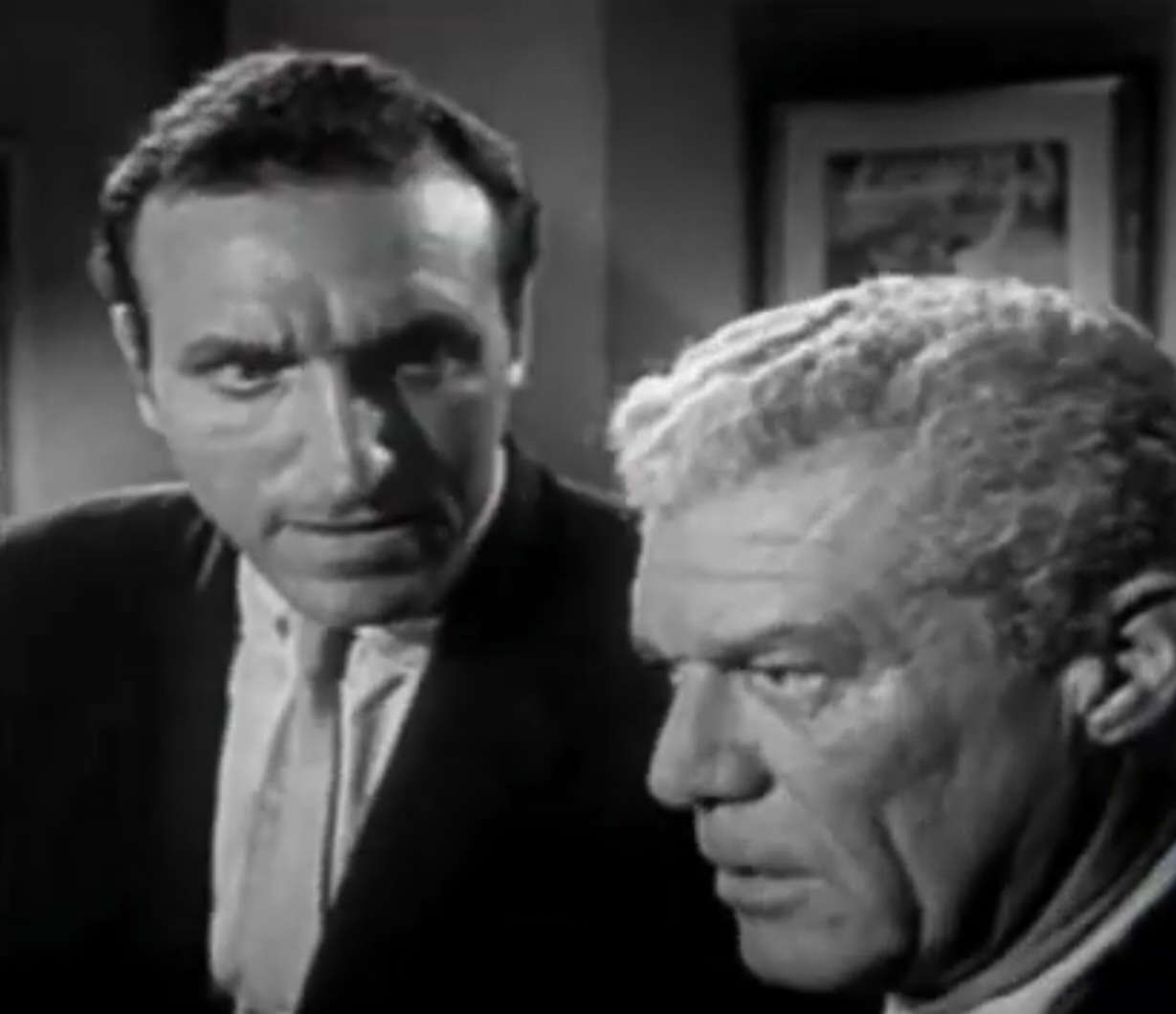
Len Lesser and Frank Gerstle in the television series Lock-Up, episode "The Seventh Hour" (1960)

Lesser was a prolific character actor in film, TV and on stage. He appeared on American television steadily beginning in 1955 on programs such as That Girl, The Untouchables, Peter Gunn, Have Gun - Will Travel, Mr. Lucky, The Outer Limits, Alfred Hitchcock Presents, Gunsmoke, Kentucky Jones, Green Acres, Get Smart, Bat Masterson, Family Affair, The Monkees, Quincy, M.E., The Rockford Files, The Amazing Spider-Man, Mad About You, All in the Family, Boy Meets World, Smart Guy, My Favorite Martian, The Munsters, and Castle. Lesser was in two episodes of Bonanza "Caution, Easter Bunny Crossing", March 29, 1970, and "Heritage of Anger", September 19, 1972. He appeared in a variety of films such as Birdman of Alcatraz (1962), How to Stuff a Wild Bikini (1965), Kelly's Heroes (1970), Blood and Lace (1971), Dirty Little Billy (1972), Papillon (1973), Truck Stop Women (1974), The Outlaw Josey Wales (1976), Supervan (1977), Moonshine County Express (1977), Ruby (1977), Death Hunt (1981), Take This Job and Shove It (1981), Grandmother's House (1988) and Baadasssss! (2003). He also guest starred on the Sabrina the Teenage Witch episode "Tick Tock Hilda's Clock."

== Later years ==
Lesser had a recurring role on Everybody Loves Raymond as Garvin, a friend of Frank Barone, who always lifted his arms in excitement whenever he saw Ray (just as Lesser did in his recurring role on Seinfeld as "Uncle Leo" whenever he saw his nephew Jerry). He also appeared in Jeff Seymour's stage production of Cold Storage at the University of Toronto's George Ignatieff Theatre.

== Personal life and death ==
Lesser was married to fellow actor Janice "Jan" Burrell, from 1954 until they divorced in 1982. The couple had two children, a son and daughter. During the course of their marriage, the couple also collaborated professionally on at least a few occasions: on the stage in 1964, and at least one time onscreen, when both appeared, albeit not together, in the 1977 horror film, Ruby. In July 1987, the ex-spouses appeared on the same bill; Lesser paired with Ivy Bethune, and Burrell, with Michael Champion, in an evening of one-act plays at the first annual L.A. Playwrights' Festival.

On February 16, 2011, Lesser died of cancer-related pneumonia in Burbank, California, at the age of 88. He was survived by his children and three grandchildren.

After learning of Lesser's death, Jerry Seinfeld said of him,

Len was one of our favorites. We always loved having him on the show. I'll never forget when Uncle Leo was in prison and tattooed "Jerry Hello" on his knuckles. He was a very sweet guy.

Another Seinfeld castmate, Jason Alexander, tweeted,

Thanks to all of you for your kind remarks re: Len Lessor [sic]. Tonight was the opening of Gigi at my beloved Reprise Theater Company and I've only returned at this late hour to hear the news. ... "Hellooo" Uncle Leo. And goodbye. Sleep well. Much love. Jason.

== Selected filmography ==
- 1955 Shack Out on 101 as Perch
- 1956 Somebody Up There Likes Me as Reporter At Sparring Session (uncredited)
- 1956 Lust for Life as Cartoonist (uncredited)
- 1956 The Rack as Officer (uncredited)
- 1957 Alfred Hitchcock Presents (Season 3 Episode 4: Heart of Gold") as Thug
- 1957 This Could Be the Night as Piano Tuner (uncredited)
- 1957 Slaughter on Tenth Avenue as Sam (uncredited)
- 1958 Have Gun - Will Travel (Season 1 Episode 38 : "Deliver the Body") as Boldt
- 1958 The Brothers Karamazov as Jailer (uncredited)
- 1958 I Want to Live! as Charlie, Newspaperman (uncredited)
- 1958 Some Came Running as Indianapolis Poker Player (uncredited)
- 1959 Crime and Punishment U.S.A. as Desk Officer
- 1960 Please Don't Eat the Daisies as Waiter At Sardi's (uncredited)
- 1960 Bells Are Ringing as Charlie Bessemer (uncredited)
- 1962 Birdman of Alcatraz as Burns (uncredited)
- 1962 Smog as Lelio Marpicati
- 1965 McHale's Navy Joins the Air Force as NKVD Commissar
- 1965 How to Stuff a Wild Bikini as Pete "North Dakota Pete"
- 1965 The Wild Wild West as Mason
- 1966 Fireball 500 as Man In Garage
- 1966 The Munsters as Manikoo In Heap Big Herman
- 1967 The Last Challenge as Ed, The Bartender (uncredited)
- 1967 The Monkees as "Red" (S2:E13, "Monkees in Texas")
- 1970 Kelly's Heroes as Sergeant Bellamy
- 1970 Bonanza (TV Series) as Fred Gaskell
- 1971 All in the Family as Billy Prendegast
- 1971 Blood and Lace as Tom Kredge
- 1972 Dirty Little Billy as Slits
- 1973 Slither as Jogger
- 1973 Papillon as Guard
- 1974 It's Good to Be Alive as Man At Accident
- 1974 Truck Stop Women as Winter
- 1974 Kolchak: The Night Stalker (They Have Been, They Are.....)
- 1974 Death Wish as Cop At The Precinct (uncredited)
- 1976 The Outlaw Josey Wales as Abe
- 1977 Supervan as Banks
- 1977 Moonshine County Express as Scoggins
- 1977 Joyride to Nowhere as Charlie
- 1977 Ruby as Barney
- 1977 Spider-Man as Henchman
- 1978 House Calls as Waiter
- 1978 Someone's Watching Me! as Burly Man
- 1979 The Main Event as Trainer At Big Bear
- 1981 Take This Job and Shove It as Roach
- 1981 Death Hunt as Lewis
- 1984 Du-beat-e-o as Hendricks
- 1988 Grandmother's House as Grandfather
- 1990 Faith as Uncle Sal
- 1990 Sorority Girls and the Creature from Hell as "Tex"
- 1990 Ain't No Way Back as Papa Campbell
- 1991-1998 Seinfeld as Uncle Leo
- 1994 Rave Review as Al
- 1996 The John Larroquette Show as Preacher (1 episode)
- 1996-2004 Everybody Loves Raymond as Garvin
- 1997 Boy Meets World as Arnie Heck (1 episode)
- 1997 Mad About You as Uncle Arnold (1 episode)
- 1997 Life with Roger as Mr. Mitchell (1 episode)
- 1998 True Friends as Mr. Slotnick
- 1998 Caroline in the City as Waiter (1 episode)
- 1998 The Werewolf Reborn!
- 1998 Smart Guy as Sidney (1 episode)
- 1998 The Secret Diary of Desmond Pfeiffer as Tailor (1 episode)
- 2001 Sabrina the Teenage Witch as Eugene (1 episode)
- 2002 Son of the Beach as Nick Pappasmearos Jr. (3 episodes)
- 2003 Just Shoot Me! as Uncle Jimmy (1 episode)
- 2003 Baadasssss! as Manny & Mort Goldberg
- 2003 Rock Me, Baby as Harvey (1 episode)
- 2004 Quintuplets as Morty (1 episode)
- 2005 Raw Footage as Grampa Joey
- 2005 ER as Woody Ebbots (1 episode)
- 2007 The Wedding Belles as Peppy Miller (1 episode)
- 2007 Cold Case as Elmer Gibbins '07 (1 episode)
- 2008 'Til Death as Gus (1 episode)
- 2008 Turbo Dates
- 2009 Castle as Neighbour (1 episode) (Final role)
