= Philadelphia Experiment II =

1993 film by Stephen Cornwell

- Promotional film poster
- Directed by: Stephen Cornwell
- Written by: Kevin Rock; Nick Paine
- Story by: Kim Steven Ketelsen
- Produced by: Mark Amin; Douglas Curtis; Paul Hellerman; Mark Levinson
- Starring: Brad Johnson; Gerrit Graham; Marjean Holden
- Cinematography: Ronn Schmidt
- Edited by: Nina Gilberti
- Music by: Gerald Gouriet
- Distributed by: Trimark Pictures
- Release date: November 12, 1993
- Running time: 97 minutes
- Country: United States
- Language: English
- Budget: $5 million
- Box office: $2,970

Philadelphia Experiment II (also known as Philadelphia Experiment 2) is a 1993 American science fiction film depicting a hypothetical Nazi-dominated America. It is the sequel to The Philadelphia Experiment (1984), with an entirely new cast and only two characters returning. It stars Brad Johnson as David Herdeg (the hero from the first film) and Gerrit Graham in a dual role as both the main villain Dr. William Mailer and his father Friedrich Mahler.

== Plot ==
Nine years after David Herdeg was transported through time from 1943 to 1984, he has settled down in modern California. He married Allison Hayes, and together they had a son named Benjamin, but Allison has since passed away. Left a single father, David faces several hardships: his business is slowly failing, Ben's school attendance has dropped, and banks are threatening to foreclose on his home. Despite these difficulties he refuses financial aid from Professor Jim Longstreet, the Philadelphia Experiment's original director, who requests that he rejoin the U.S. Navy. David has also been experiencing painful episodes which Longstreet rationalizes as stress-related.

Meanwhile, engineer William Mailer – the son of Friedrich Mahler, a Nazi scientist who worked on a project similar to the Philadelphia Experiment – uses the Experiment's technology for his own creation, meant to teleport a bomber into enemy airspace for a surprise strike and then teleport it out before the enemy could react. Mailer demonstrates this technology by beaming a model aircraft across a room. His experiment garners significant interest, but Longstreet convinces the panel not to back it out of fear for the potential dangers. Longstreet, who gave Mailer the equipment, stipulated that it only be used for testing. Mailer's tests are also the cause of David's recurring episodes.

David learns that Longstreet lied to him and packs to leave California, hoping to get far away from the experiment. Mailer, desperate to prove the validity of his work, uses the technology to teleport an F-117 Nighthawk, but the aircraft does not return. David experiences a painful seizure and witnesses the world change around him, with Ben disappearing in the process. He finds himself in a completely altered 1993 and flees from a heavily armed military unit. David is rescued by Jess, the leader of an underground resistance, who reveals to him that Nazi Germany won World War II and is about to mark 50 years of Nazi rule over America.

The turning point in Germany's victory involved a futuristic aircraft, the Phoenix, which was used to drop atomic bombs on Washington, D.C. and other major targets on the East Coast. The United States and other Allied powers then surrendered to Nazi Germany. The Phoenix was subsequently destroyed in an explosion, and Mahler, who took credit for building it, was ridiculed because he could not reproduce it. The Phoenix was, in fact, the F-117 from Mailer's experiment, sent back in time with a nuclear payload; Mailer intended to send it to Ramstein Air Base in Germany, which succeeded, but also transferred the craft through time. Mahler found the plane and claimed credit for inventing it.

Longstreet, the leader of the resistance group in the altered timeline, recruits David to go back in time and stop the Phoenix from being used; this is possible because David's previous time traveling has given his blood unique properties. Mailer – a Nazi administrator in the new timeline – has also developed the time travel technology and is aware of the Philadelphia Experiment and David's experience with it. The resistance attacks Mailer's base in an attempt to reach the machine, but David is captured and Mailer draws a vial of blood. David escapes and travels back in time, but Mailer soon follows.

David and Mailer arrive in 1943 on the night before the Phoenix leaves on its mission. Mailer encounters his father and tries to explain who he is and what the fate of the Phoenix will be. His father states that he does not have a son. While they speak, David manages to destroy the aircraft. He attempts to escape through the time portal, but Mailer shoots and wounds him. Before Mailer can kill him, David shoots and kills Mahler, causing a time paradox that erases Mailer. David crawls into the portal and returns to a corrected 1993, meeting Ben at his Little League baseball game. He is bemused to discover that Jess is now the mother of one of Ben's teammates.

== Cast ==
- Brad Johnson as David Herdeg
- Marjean Holden as Jess
- Gerrit Graham as Dr. William Mailer / Friedrich Mahler
- John Christian Graas as Benjamin Herdeg
- James Greene as Professor Longstreet
- Cyril O'Reilly as Decker
- Geoffrey Blake as Logan
- Lisa Robins as Scotch
- David Wells as Pinstripes
- Larry Cedar as Hank, The Controller
- Al Pugliese as Coach

== See also ==
- Hypothetical Axis victory in World War II — includes an extensive list of other Wikipedia articles regarding works of Nazi Germany / Axis / World War II alternate history
