= Grandmother's House (film) =

Grandma's House
- Promotional poster
- Directed by: Peter Rader
- Written by: Gayle Jensen; Peter C. Jensen
- Produced by: Nico Mastorakis
- Starring: Eric Foster; Kim Valentine; Len Lesser; Ida Lee
- Cinematography: Peter C. Jensen
- Edited by: Barry Zetlin
- Music by: Nigel Holton; Clive Wright
- Production company: Omega Entertainment
- Distributed by: Academy Entertainment
- Release date: 1988
- Running time: 90 minutes
- Country: United States
- Language: English

Grandmother's House (also known as Grandma's House) is a 1988 American slasher film directed by Peter Rader and starring Eric Foster, Kim Valentine, Len Lesser and Ida Lee. It follows an orphaned brother and sister who, after moving in with their elderly grandparents, come to suspect them to be psychopathic murderers. The film was produced by Nico Mastorakis.

== Plot ==
Adolescent David and his teenage sister Lynn are orphaned after their father dies unexpectedly, and are sent to live with their maternal grandparents at their Victorian home in rural California. The children previously lived in the home with their mother when they were very young, but have little memory of it. En route by bus, the children witness an ominous woman standing in the middle of the road near their grandparents' home, almost causing the driver to get into an accident. During their first night, David has a nightmare about his grandfather killing a woman.

The next day, David and Lynn attend a local swimming competition. The mysterious woman hitchhikes with a local man to the competition, apparently stalking the children. David notices the woman beckoning him from behind the bleachers. In the pool, Lynn meets Kenny, who takes romantic interest in her. When they return home, they find the police gathered near the property, removing the corpse of the man from a pond. Police tell the grandfather that the man's van is missing. That afternoon, a family barbecue is held at the house with the Sacketts and their children, Raymond and Darlene. While exploring the surrounding orange orchards with Raymond, David is told that a woman was allegedly murdered inside the tunnel of an irrigation ditch, and that her body was stuffed behind the stone wall. Convinced there are other bodies in the connected pond, Raymond fashions a makeshift bomb and detonates it, hoping to dredge them.

Fleeing after the explosion, David runs back to his grandparents' home, where he witnesses them burning clothing and dragging a woman's body into the cellar. Upon sneaking into the cellar, David finds the woman's apparently dead body stuffed in a refrigerator—the same woman he saw at the swim competition. David is startled to find his grandfather confronting him at the top of the staircase. During the picnic, a police officer stops by inquiring about the explosion. David attempts to tell him about the woman's body, but is prevented by his grandfather.

As the Sacketts leave, David sneaks into the attic, where his grandfather follows him. David escapes onto the roof of the house, accidentally severing the house's phone line in the process. Moments later, Kenny arrives to take Lynn on a date, leaving David alone at home with his grandparents. While driving in the orchard, Kenny and Lynn get the car stuck after running over an old pipe drain. Lynn returns to the house on foot to retrieve a jack. David confronts Lynn in the garage, where they find the woman seated in their grandparents' large truck, handcuffed to the steering wheel. David is shocked to find the woman is still alive, and she explains she is being kept prisoner, and that she came to warn the children about the dangers of living in their grandparents' house. They manage to undo the woman's handcuffs, after which she begins to attack David.

The children's grandparents stumble upon the melee, and send them to run and retrieve help. They stumble upon a police deputy, who escorts them back to the house. He informs them the woman is in fact their mother—whom they were led to believe was dead—and has recently escaped from a psychiatric hospital in Jamestown, and is dangerous. The woman viciously stabs the deputy to death, and the children flee into the garage and escape in the truck, as the woman clings to the side. They manage to throw her from the truck as they speed through the orchard before the car dies, leaving them stranded on foot. The woman manages to start the truck, and begins chasing the children through the grove.

David and Lynn finally manage to flee back to their grandparents' house. Inside, David uncovers a photograph of their mother, next to the corpse of their grandmother, but Lynn refuses to believe it is the same woman. David fires a shotgun at the front door when a silhouette appears in the window, unintentionally shooting Kenny in the abdomen. Police arrive moments later, searching for the missing deputy, but cannot find the woman David and Lynn claim have attacked them. David is taken to the hospital for his head injury, and kept overnight. He escapes the hospital in the morning, and steals a bicycle to travel back to his grandparents' home. He witnesses his grandfather carrying his incapacitated mother through the orchard. He follows them into the basement, where he watches his grandfather murdering his mother, and referring to David as his son. David realizes he is a product of incest between his mother and grandfather. David confronts his grandfather (and father), and, in a fit of rage, beats him to death with an axe, avenging his mother.

== Cast ==
- Eric Foster as David
- Kim Valentine as Lynn
- Len Lesser as Grandfather
- Ida Lee as Grandmother
- Brinke Stevens as Woman
- Michael Robinson as Kenny
- Craig Yerman as Raymond Sackett
- David Donham as Mr. Sackett
- Joan-Carol Bensen as Mrs. Sackett
- Angela O'Neill as Darlene Sackett
- R.J. Walker as Sheriff
- Furley Lumpkin as Deputy
- Jeanette Jamron as Twin 1
- Anitra Jamron as Twin 2
- David Algeier as Minister
- Michael Flaherty as Swim Coach

== Release ==
=== Critical response ===
The New York Daily News praised the film as a "clever, low-budget chiller, a twisty, stylishly lensed and well-acted sleeper that supplies more than its share of visceral excitement and authentic suspense."

=== Home media ===
In 1999, the film was issued on DVD by Simitar Entertainment. Later, it was released in a restored widescreen edition from Image Entertainment in 2003. In April 2019, the film was restored and released as a DVD-Blu-ray combo-pack by Vinegar Syndrome.

== See also ==
- Psycho-biddy
