= Nico Mastorakis =

Greek filmmaker and radio producer

Nico Mastorakis (Greek: Νίκος Μαστοράκης; born 28 April 1941) is a Greek filmmaker and radio producer. He is probably best known for his 1973 live interview of 17 arrested Greek students, which happened without their consent, in favor of the Greek military junta. The students were later tortured. He is also known for writing and directing the infamous exploitation horror film Island of Death in 1975 and co-creating the nationally available Star Channel in 1993.

== Early career ==
At the age of 18, Mastorakis was a young reporter with the Greek newspaper Ethnikos Kirikas scored his first international scoop, an exclusive interview with the exiled Princess Soraya. Later, as an investigative reporter for the daily Messimvrini, adding to multiple award-winning reports, he created the first "automobile page" in Greek press.

In his last job as a reporter for the daily Apogevmatini he posed as a musician for the group of popular singer Giannis Poulopoulos and gained access to Aristotle Onassis’ yacht, the Christina where Onassis was hosting Jackie and Ted Kennedy.

He used a Minox camera hidden behind the strings of his guitar to take photos but was discovered by Ted Kennedy's security men and, although managing to fly out of Skorpios with his negatives intact, he was later arrested by the junta's secret police and detained for the night while his negatives were discovered and confiscated.

Although his article about that night being heavily censored he broke the news of Onassis and Jackie Kennedy getting married months before the official announcement.

Mastorakis’ time on board the Onassis yacht was later described in detail in both Ari and Nemesis, by Onassis’ biographer Peter Evans, who writes: "Onassis used his pull with the colonels and Mastorakis was picked up in Athens… later Ari showed me a copy of Mastorakis’ original story which had been cut to ribbons by the military censors".

He was already a radio personality since the late 1950s, as Mastorakis was considered by many to be the DJ who brought international pop to Greek radio. In all, he hosted and produced more than 22 different radio shows. In the late sixties, he was introduced to The Beatles and became friendly with John Lennon in particular. On April 17, 1967 he produced the first ever international pop concert in Athens, booking the Rolling Stones for a memorable albeit troubled concert, dominated by police and amidst the riots which regularly occurred in Athens at the time. The military coup came four days later.

As a lyricist and record producer, he launched the careers of almost all of the Greek pop groups of the sixties, working mainly with the Forminx and their keyboard player Vangelis Papathanassiou, later known as the film score composer Vangelis.

Mastorakis was instrumental in the creation of Greek television in the late 1960s. From early 1966 (before the junta years) and until 1973 while Greece was under the Regime of the Colonels, he produced and hosted numerous entertainment shows in the army-owned YENED TV station. While the station's primary goal was to propagandize for the army his shows were mostly apolitical fare, such as game shows and celebrity interviews, including a Greek version of This Is Your Life, and he was among the most popular TV personalities of the time. He produced local versions of many international formats (Candid Camera, To Tell The Truth) and worked for both YENED and ERT, the country's national TV network. In addition to his shows he produced and directed Alati kai Piperi (Salt and Pepper), hosted by noted Greek columnist Freddy Germanos. One of the highlights of that show was when Mastorakis brought John Lennon and Yoko Ono into the military TV's two-camera studio. He wrote, produced and directed dramatic series and variety shows as well as the short-lived breakthrough sci-fi episodic Invasion From Another Planet, the first on Greek TV to be shot on film.

However his TV career took some dramatic turns as he was ousted twice by the junta, the unofficial reason being cited "for speaking freely". The first time that his shows were abruptly banned was for his comment to a 6-year-old girl (on a family show) "how can you ever buy a Christmas tree with the cost of life as they are today", a comment which was considered by the military regime as "anti-government propaganda". At the time he was serving in the navy and eventually returned to TV, only to be ousted (by order of dictator Georgios Papadopoulos) because he interviewed a 12-year-old girl who had married and had a baby. Papadopoulos considered the interview as "corruption of ethics for the Greek family". For almost a year, Mastorakis was producing "underground" with the silent consent of YENED's management until his final return. His career as a journalist also had clashes with the junta. After writing a long piece about Mikis Theodorakis’ concert in London, for the weekly magazine Epikera, he was arrested and detained at the ESA (Military Police) headquarters for a day. Later on, publisher Georgios Athanassiadis, hired Mastorakis for the daily Vradini (which had been shut down by the junta and was about to be published again) only to find out from Dimitrios Ioannidis (head of the Military Police and later the dictator who replaced instigating a bloodier junta) that the newspaper's permit had been withdrawn because "Athanassiadis had hired anarchist-communists like Mastorakis".

== Junta controversy ==
In the aftermath of the 1973 Athens Polytechnic uprising, the regime made use of Mastorakis' popularity to repair its public image. An interview was set up and broadcast, during which he interviewed, in prison, a number of students who had been arrested during the events. Mastorakis claimed that he had guarantees from Minister of Press Spyridon Zournatzis that the interview would not be censored and that the students would not be prosecuted for speaking freely.

After the fall of the regime in 1974, the students were released from prison and stated that they had been beaten and threatened with legal and extra-legal punishment unless they cooperated in the interview. Nico Mastorakis himself claimed that he had been coerced into making the show, but his popularity had evaporated, and the new management of the Greek TV stations wanted nothing to do with him.

== Later career ==
Unable to work in public television after the junta, Mastorakis turned to commercials and features and eventually left the country in 1975 to pursue his career as a B-movie-maker overseas. He had already made two low budget movies, one of which later became a cult classic (Island of Death) and while living in London he wrote the screenplay for The Greek Tycoon (1978), a roman à clef based on his encounters with Aristotle Onassis. The movie, financed by Allan Klein, starred Anthony Quinn and Jacqueline Bisset and was distributed by Universal. Mastorakis landed a two-year contract with Paramount but he turned independent with Blood Tide (1982) which he wrote and produced. He has since written, produced and directed 17 features, mainly low budget but with awards attached (Blind Date, Nightmare at Noon, Grandmother's House) and distribution by major studios and mainstream TV networks. He wrote two published novels (Fire Below Zero and Keepers of the Secret) with Barnaby Conrad and was instrumental in the careers of Hans Zimmer (his first music score for Terminal Exposure), Kirstie Alley, Valeria Golino and award-winning composer Vangelis, with whom Mastorakis wrote a bundle of Greek pop top hits in the sixties.

He then later started production company/distributor Omega Entertainment, in which, by November 1987, had sold off all rights to the 9 major films in 14 major territories and most of the small ones to distributor RCA/Columbia Pictures International Video, excluding North American rights to pics such as Glitch, Nightmare at Noon, Bloodstone and Under the Gun, and the titles he was set to produce and occasionally direct cost $5 million and claimed that his titles would be like hot cakes.

He returned to Greece in late 1989 to launch Antenna TV which he managed for three years. He left in 1993 to create a new independent TV network, Star Channel. Since then, he hosted the relatively successful "Arga" (Late), a late night talk show, and revamped the beauty pageant telecasts.

He also wrote and directed sitcoms including Goodnight, Mom and Divorced With Children, and the politically incorrect satirical show Not the ANT1 News. In 1995, he launched his own classic rock radio station (Radio Gold) which he recently sold to Pegassus Publishing Group.

== Filmography ==
- Island of Death (1975)
- Death Has Blue Eyes (1976)
- The Greek Tycoon (1978)
- Blood Tide (1982)
- Blind Date (1984)
- The Next One (1984)
- Sky High (1985)
- The Zero Boys (1986)
- The Wind (1986)
- Terminal Exposure (1987)
- Glitch (1988)
- Nightmare at Noon (1988)
- Bloodstone (1988)
- Grandmother's House (1988)
- Darkroom (1989)
- Ninja Academy (1989)
- Hired to Kill (1990)
- In the Cold of the Night (1990)
- The Naked Truth (1992)
- .com for Murder (2001)
