= Ed Naha =

American novelist

- Born: June 10, 1950 (age 76); Linden, New Jersey, U.S.
- Education: Kean University
- Occupation: Writer · Producer

Ed Naha (born June 10, 1950) is an American science fiction and mystery writer and producer. His first known publication was artwork that appeared in the first issue of Modern Monsters magazine, dated June 1966.

== Education and early career ==
Naha was born in Linden, New Jersey and graduated from Kean University in New Jersey with a degree in Secondary English Education. His early career was as a journalist, writing pieces about film and rock music for American publications such as Playboy, The Village Voice, Rolling Stone, and The New York Post.

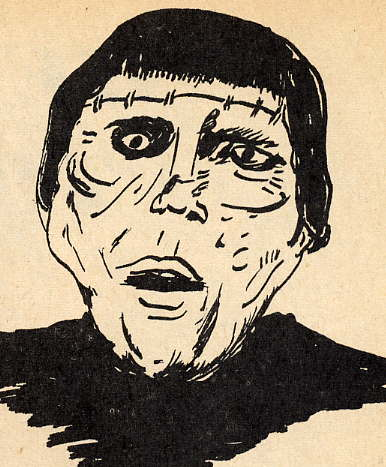
Drawing by 16-yr-old Ed Naha from Modern Monsters magazine, Issue One, June 1966

He worked in publicity and artistic development at Columbia Records, where he was mentored by the producer and talent scout John Hammond. He produced the spoken-word album Inside Star Trek in 1976, featuring the series creator Gene Roddenberry with guests William Shatner, DeForest Kelley, and Mark Lenard. That same year, the Bruce Springsteen album Born to Run, for which Naha was A&R Coordinator, was certified gold.

== Journalism, novels and non-fiction ==
Naha worked as a staff writer and editor for the science fiction film magazine Starlog. Under the pseudonym Joe Bonham (a name borrowed from the protagonist of Dalton Trumbo's anti-war novel Johnny Got His Gun) he edited the first issue of Starlog's sister magazine, the popular horror film magazine Fangoria. Naha has written more than 25 novels in the horror, mystery and science fiction genres, including the Traveler science fiction series under the "house pseudonym" D.B. Drumm, which Naha shared with John Shirley. His mystery novel Cracking Up was nominated for the Edgar Award for "Best Paperback Original" by the Mystery Writers of America in 1992. His novelizations include prose adaptations of the films Dead-Bang, Ghostbusters II, and the first two RoboCop pictures. Naha's nonfiction works include The Science Fictionary, The Films of Roger Corman: Brilliance on a Budget, The Making of Dune (1984), and the posthumous editions of Lillian Roxon's Rock Encyclopedia.

== Screenwriting and television production ==
Naha's screen work includes two screenplays for Roger Corman, Oddballs and Wizards of the Lost Kingdom, and three scripts for producer Charles Band: Troll, Dolls, and Spellcaster. Naha achieved his greatest commercial success through a screenplay collaboration with Dolls director Stuart Gordon and Brian Yuzna on the script for a comedy/science-fantasy feature, The Teenie-Weenies, which became the family-friendly franchise Honey, I Shrunk the Kids. He served as a writer and producer of the TV shows Honey, I Shrunk the Kids and The Adventures of Sinbad. Naha's contractual work for Hollywood is done through his company A Fine Mess, Inc., named in honor of his comedy idols, Laurel and Hardy.

Most recently, Naha has been credited with the screenplays for the first three titles in the "Epic Stories of the Bible" series of animated features produced by Promenade Pictures.

== Politics ==
As a sideline, Naha maintains a political blog, hosted at The Smirking Chimp, which he says was motivated by his concern over the inauguration of George W. Bush as 43rd President of the United States.
