= Jeff Lester =

American actor (born 1955)

- Born: May 4, 1955 (age 71); Orange County, California, U.S.
- Occupations: Actor, Executive Producer, Writer, and Director
- Years active: 1981–present
- Spouse: Susan Anton (m. 1992)

Jeff Lester (born May 4, 1955) is an American actor known for his television appearances. In 1996, Lester transitioned from acting to producing, writing and directing where he has created award-winning commercials and short films.

== Career ==
=== Actor ===
==== Television ====
Lester played the lead role in Once a Hero, as superhero Captain Justice and his alter-ego archeologist, Brad Steele. The show was widely promoted and critically acclaimed, but was a ratings failure, and was cancelled after only three episodes were broadcast (seven episodes were developed).

Among his other performances, Lester played Raymond in a Seinfeld episode called "The Note". In the episode, Lester played a masseur who gave George Costanza a massage which makes George extremely uncomfortable and later becomes frantic that he may now be gay.

Lester was also in Baywatch episodes, Growing Pains and Lou Grant.

==== Film ====
He appeared as an FBI Agent in Star Trek IV: The Voyage Home, as well as The Little Drummer Girl and In the Cold of the Night.

=== Directing ===
Since the start of the 1990s Lester has worked as an executive producer, writer and director for several commercials, stage productions and films. In 1996, Lester began his directing career with the program “Sundance Dailies” where he worked with Robert Redford’s Sundance Channel. He then went on to create, write, produce and direct “The Shorts Show,” a series about filmmakers of short films, hosted by Academy Award winner, Laura Dern. In 1997, Lester and his wife, Susan Anton, opened production company Big Picture Studios. Film work includes the short western The Last Real Cowboys (2000), the thriller Broken (2006), the short drama Mr. President (2007) and the short film Speed of Life (2008).

The Last Real Cowboys (2000), starring Academy Award and Golden Globes winner Billy Bob Thornton and actor Mickey Jones was Big Picture Studios’ debut film. Lester directed, produced and co-authored the story line with screenwriter Rudy Gaines. It premiered at the Santa Barbara International Film Festival. It also went on to air at South by Southwest and the Aspen Shortsfest. The film has won multiple awards at festivals including the New York's Shorts International Film Festival ("Best Comedy"), Telluride Mountain Film Festival ("Best Short Film") and CineVegas Film Festival ("Best Short Film Cinematography”).

Mr. President (2007) depicts a fictitious presidential debate between a Black senator and President George W. Bush. The film premiered at the Los Angeles-based ELEVATE Film Festival (ELEVATE) where it won three awards including the audience award for best narrative film and the jury award for most elevating narrative. Lester also shared the honor of “Best Narrative Director” with Jason Roberts, director of the short 10 Seconds to. At the time of the premiere, ELEVATE was the largest single screen film festival event in the world and filmmakers were challenged to, “create works that inspire people and societies to break out of the limited thinking and prejudices that persistently divide mankind.” The festival was judged by Michel Shane, A. Kitman Ho and Martha De Laurentiis.

Speed of Life (2008) premiered at the 2008 Slamdance Film Festival. The documentary was shown with four other short films as part of the “A Chance at Slamdance 2008” contest. The five films were chosen out of more than 115 submissions.

==== Awards ====
Lester has received several awards, including Telly Awards, Addy Awards and Summit Awards.

His film The Last Real Cowboys (2000) won multiple awards including “Best Comedy” at the New York's Shorts International Film Festival, “Best Short Film” at the Telluride Mountain Film Festival and "Best Short Film Cinematography” at the CineVegas Film Festival. His film Mr. President (2007) also won multiple awards including the audience award for a narrative, the jury award for most elevating narrative and “Best Narrative Director” at the ELEVATE Film Festival.

In 2014, Lester received an Emmy Award Nomination for Vegas PBS program Frank Wildhorn & Friends (Arts/Entertainment – Program category) along with Myron Martin, Kevin Robinson, Adam McCarthy, Cade Cridland and Jessey Riley.

== Partial filmography ==
- 1984: The Little Drummer Girl - American
- 1986: Star Trek IV: The Voyage Home - FBI Agent
- 1990: In the Cold of the Night - Scott Bruin
- 1990: Baywatch - Lance Jarvis -Season 1 Episode 21 "Old Friends"
- 1992: Baywatch - Lane Brody -Season 2 Episode 20 "The Big Spill"
