= The Greek Tycoon =

1978 film by J. Lee Thompson

- Theatrical release poster by David Blossom
- Directed by: J. Lee Thompson
- Screenplay by: Morton S. Fine
- Story by: Nico Mastorakis; Win Wells; Morton S. Fine
- Produced by: Allen Klein; Ely Landau
- Starring: Anthony Quinn; Jacqueline Bisset; Raf Vallone; Edward Albert; Charles Durning; Luciana Paluzzi; Camilla Sparv; Marilu Tolo; James Franciscus
- Cinematography: Tony Richmond
- Edited by: Alan Strachan
- Music by: Stanley Myers
- Production company: ABKCO Films
- Distributed by: Universal Pictures
- Release date: 12 May 1978
- Running time: 107 minutes
- Country: United States
- Language: English
- Budget: $6.5 million
- Box office: $14 million

The Greek Tycoon is a 1978 American biographical romantic drama film, of the roman à clef type, directed by J. Lee Thompson. The screenplay by Morton S. Fine is based on a story by Fine, Nico Mastorakis, and Win Wells, who loosely based it on Aristotle Onassis and his relationship with Jacqueline Kennedy. Mastorakis denied this, instead stating "We're not doing a film about Aristotle Onassis. It's a personification of all Greek Tycoons." The film stars Anthony Quinn in the title role and Jacqueline Bisset as the character based on Kennedy. Quinn also appeared in Thompson's 1979 film The Passage. Various plot lines track the Kennedy assassination and Onassis relationships but the ordering of the timeline being vastly different. Onassis' son did die in a plane crash, one of his ex-wives committed suicide and the marriage was short lived due to a sudden illness. Names were similar but not identical.

== Plot ==
Aging Greek Theo Tomasis rose from his peasant roots to become a mogul who owns oil tankers, airlines, and Mediterranean islands and longs to be elected President of Greece. He eventually falls in love with the considerably younger Liz Cassidy. The two first meet when she is visiting his island estate with her husband James, the Senator from the state of Massachusetts. Theo immediately is attracted to her and, despite the fact she is happily married, begins to woo her aboard his yacht while James converses with the former Prime Minister of the United Kingdom.

Meanwhile, Theo's relationship with his son, Nico, is tenuous at best. He encourages Nico to join the business and make money in the same manner he did. Nico wants to manage his own affairs and convinces his father to jumpstart his ventures. The plan is to buy older freighters and convert them to oil tankers and sell them to the Saudi family. This would allow Saudi oil magnates to control the delivery of oil outside of American Corporate controls. Theo is impressed and helps bankroll the purchase of a fleet of boats.

Upon their return to the States, the Cassidys begin their run for President of the United States, eventually winning the primary and the general election. The First Lady later suffers a miscarriage and becomes depressed and tired of the public life. Tomasis, who has a good relationship with the First Family, offers a vacation on his yacht as a change of pace. The President does not care for Tomasis due to his shady dealings in the shipping business and Arab oil states, so Lizzie goes by herself, much to his anger.

In Greece, the yacht is full of guests and celebrities. Tomasis seems to spend a lot of time with Lizzie, who is a bit restrained. During a dinner however, Lizzie joins in a traditional sensual dance with plates being thrown and the other guests clapping. Lizzie is attracted to Tomasis' free spirit and joie de vivre and leaves the vacation early to go back to the states-much to his protests.

Back in the US, Lizzie and James walk on the family beach-front property, where the President is assassinated by a sharpshooter. After the funeral, Lizzie becomes depressed and stays outside of public eyes even though the former President's brother John (the attorney general) requests she help promote his campaign. She refuses, and Tomasis, re-invites her to Greece for a longer stay.

In Greece, the relationship blooms and Lizzie cheers up. Tomasis' business dealings with Nico are becoming scrutinized by American politicians due to the OPEC embargoes and anger over oil prices. Freighters are getting confiscated and the investment of hundreds of millions at risk. Upon his return from the US, Theo asks Lizzie to marry him. Lizzie wants to but is worried about appearances in her country, but he outlines the arrangement that is fair and financially attractive enough to abandon the Cassidy family fortune and control.

After the wedding, there are growing pains for the relationship, as Lizzie is accustomed to being a voice in her husband's affairs in the past. After Tomasis berates her for interfering in his business, he apologizes for his Greek chauvinism, and they learn to live with each other's cultural differences. The marriage is loving until Niko dies in an accident, and Tomasis gets depressed. Lizzie manages to coax him out of his moods, and things appear to look up as his lawyer and representative cops him a cheap plea deal on the oil manipulation charges. However, his health declines and a doctor gives him a bad prognosis. He holds his medical information secret as his energy and health declines. When Liz wants to shop in Paris, he encourages her to go alone and enjoy herself. She leaves the boat on her vacation, waving, and Tomasis visits his old peasant home on the coast for the last time visiting his old haunts and ending with traditional Greek dance.

== Cast ==
- Anthony Quinn as Theo Tomasis (Aristotle Onassis)
- Jacqueline Bisset as Liz Cassidy (Jacqueline "Jackie" Bouvier Kennedy Onassis)
- James Franciscus as James Cassidy (John F. Kennedy)
- Edward Albert as Nico Tomasis (Alexander S. Onassis)
- Camilla Sparv as Simi Tomasis (Athina Niarchos Onassis Spencer-Churchill Livanos)
- Marilù Tolo as Sophia Matalas (Maria Callas)
- Charles Durning as Michael Russell
- Luciana Paluzzi as Paola Scotti (Renata Tebaldi)
- Roland Culver as Robert Keith (Winston Churchill)
- Robin Clarke as John Cassidy (Robert "Bobby" F. Kennedy)
- Kathryn Leigh Scott as Nancy Cassidy

== Production ==
Producer Nico Mastorakis reportedly offered Jackie Onassis $1 million to play herself in a film called Tycoon. She refused. When Christina Onassis declined to give permission for the movie, Mastorakis changed it to be "fictional".

Quinn said that he met Onassis six months before the latter's death and the tycoon gave his blessing to Quinn's casting. Quinn said Jackie Kennedy asked him to not make the movie. Quinn originally decided not to do it but then changed his mind after Jackie snubbed him at a restaurant.

Filming started 1 October 1976 with a reported budget of $4 million. Quinn was paid $500,000 and Bissett $250,000.

The film was shot on location in New York City, Athens, Mykonos, Corfu, Washington, D.C., and London.

The film's theme song, "(Life is) Just a Dance with Time," was written by John Kongos and recorded by Petula Clark in both English and French (as "Le Grec").

In September 1977 Universal bought the film for a reported $8 million.

== Release ==
=== Critical reception ===
The film opened to negative reviews, for the jet set films of the time were losing audience attention and box office receipts. Audiences had stopped caring about the stories of rich and famous people such as had interested them in the 1960s, in the time of movies like The Carpetbaggers and Where Love Has Gone. In the end, the blockbuster films and special-effects films of the late 1970s attracted more viewers than the films about the decadent rich.

Vincent Canby of The New York Times called the film "as witless as it is gutless" and said it "recalls a sort of newspaper journalism you don't see much anymore — the Sunday supplement recapitulation of a famous murder, divorce or other scandal, put together, from morgue clips, and filled out by the writer with breathless speculation about what really might have happened and what really might have been said, always with more exclamation points than are absolutely necessary. It's the literature of vultures who have no interest in tearing into something of the first freshness."

Roger Ebert gave the film 2 stars out of 4 and wrote, "'The Greek Tycoon' was not made without a certain style, and it cost a lot of money, but watching it is somehow like witnessing a multimillion-dollar cinematic edition of the National Enquirer." Ebert went on to state, however, that "I must give credit where due: The role of the tycoon is wonderfully well-acted by Anthony Quinn, and the movie's good moments are all his."

"Hege" of Variety said, "It's a trashy, opulent, vulgar, racy $6.5 million picture. You've watched the headlines, now you can read the movie."

Gene Siskel of the Chicago Tribune awarded 3.5 stars out of 4 and wrote, "This one is easy to review. 'The Greek Tycoon,' a film a clef about Jackie Kennedy and Aristotle Onassis, is a lot of fun and it's great looking. And surprise—it's not tasteless." He also called Quinn "superb. He's vulgar, cunning, brutal, funny — a Zorba as captain of a multinational business. Everything about the character is correct."

Kevin Thomas of the Los Angeles Times wrote that "surprisingly enough, once past the obligatory gestures to the lavish jet set genre to which 'The Greek Tycoon' inevitably belongs, we're actually able to forget Quinn and Miss Bisset's real-life counterparts and become involved and even moved by a stormy-tender romance between two dramatic people. Writer Mort Fine, working from a story by him and others, and director J. Lee Thompson, who has a knack for drawing fine performances from actors regardless of a film's level or scope, has brought out the very best from Miss Bisset and especially Quinn."

Jack Kroll of Newsweek called it a "foul and sleazy film" that "is so awful you hate to use it to raise an ethical issue, but it does make you wonder just when sleaze curdles into slander - moral if not legal. You don't know whom to feel sorrier for, the bedeviled Jackie Onassis or the beautiful Jackie Bisset. Jackie O can't help being an American obsession, but Jackie B should have known better than to sign on this yacht of fools."

Gary Arnold of The Washington Post called the film "definitely on the blah side ... Producer Allen Klein and the hirelings responsible for 'The Greek Tycoon' lack the courage of their own tastelessness."

TV Guide rated the film one star and commented, "If you can't guess who the characters are in this, you must have been living on Mars for the last few decades . . . If scenery, greenery, and lavish living are what you like to see, you may enjoy The Greek Tycoon. If honesty, drama, and real feelings are more to your taste, read a book."

Time Out London called the film a "glossy travesty" and added, "Upmarket exploitation pics tend to make it (ie. profit) on the merest smell of money, sex and scandal, and this effort just reeks."

=== Box office ===
The film opened at number one in the United States and Canada and was number one the following week as well.

== See also ==
- Cultural depictions of Jacqueline Kennedy Onassis
