= In the Cards =

- Star Trek: Deep Space Nine episode
- Episode no.: Season 5 Episode 25
- Directed by: Michael Dorn
- Story by: Truly Barr Clark; Scott J. Neal
- Teleplay by: Ronald D. Moore
- Production code: 525
- Original air date: June 9, 1997

Guest appearances
- Jeffrey Combs as Weyoun; Brian Markinson as Dr. Elias Giger; Aron Eisenberg as Nog; Chase Masterson as Leeta; Louise Fletcher as Kai Winn

Episode chronology
← Previous "Empok Nor"	Next → "Call to Arms"
- Star Trek: Deep Space Nine season 5

"In the Cards" is the penultimate episode of the fifth season of Star Trek: Deep Space Nine. This episode marks the directorial debut of Michael Dorn, who also played the character Worf on the show.

"In the Cards" was written by Truly Barr Clark, Scott Neal, and Ronald D. Moore, and premiered on June 9, 1997. In addition to the regular Deep Space Nine cast, the episode features Louise Fletcher, Chase Masterson, Jeffrey Combs, and Aron Eisenberg in their recurring roles and a guest performance from Brian Markinson.

Set in the 24th century, the series follows the adventures of the crew of the Starfleet-managed space station Deep Space Nine near the planet Bajor; later seasons of the show follow the conflict between the United Federation of Planets and a hostile empire known as the Dominion. In this episode, Jake Sisko, the son of station captain Benjamin Sisko, and his friend Nog try to acquire a baseball card, while running afoul of more serious political machinations.

== Plot ==
The seeming inevitability of war with the Dominion has Deep Space Nine's command staff depressed, especially Captain Sisko. His son Jake learns that a 1951 Willie Mays rookie card will be for sale at an upcoming auction and decides to buy it as a gift to cheer up his baseball-loving father. Jake enlists Nog's help (and funds) to acquire the antique.

The oddball Dr. Elias Giger buys the lot that includes the card. Giger offers to give the card to Jake in exchange for a strange assortment of equipment—material to construct a "cellular regeneration and entertainment chamber", which Giger believes will grant immortality. Privately, the boys decide the man is crazy but agree to his offer, and obtain the required materials by doing various odd jobs for the station's senior officers, including Chief O'Brien, Dr. Bashir, Major Kira, and Lieutenant Commander Worf. To keep Jake's gift a surprise, they do not reveal the reason they want these items.

Meanwhile, Bajoran spiritual leader Kai Winn is considering a proposed non-aggression pact between Bajor and the Dominion. She is torn, not wishing to align Bajor with the Dominion, but not trusting the Federation to make Bajor's defense a priority in the event of war. Captain Sisko recommends that Winn stall for time before committing herself to a decision. The Dominion negotiator, Weyoun, has guest quarters above Giger's, and is wary of the odd noises emanating from downstairs.

Returning to Giger's quarters to deliver the requested equipment, Jake and Nog find the room empty with no sign of Giger. Jake confronts Winn and accuses her of kidnapping the doctor, earning a reprimand from Captain Sisko. Jake and Nog are unexpectedly beamed aboard Weyoun's ship: Weyoun, aware that the youths have been in contact with Giger, Winn, and the entirety of the station's senior staff, suspects they are up to something. Jake explains the scheme to obtain the card, but Weyoun seems incredulous, so Jake concocts a story that Willie Mays is a time-traveling saboteur he and Nog are investigating. Weyoun believes Jake's first story, deciding it was all innocent coincidence after all, and sends the boys away with the card.

Captain Sisko reflects on how his crew's moods have improved, over a montage illustrating how Jake and Nog's trades have helped them; the montage concludes with the captain hugging his son upon receiving the card.

== Reception ==
Reviewing the episode for Tor.com in 2014, Keith R.A. DeCandido gave the episode a favorable review. He highlighted the episode's role as comic relief in the midst of the weighty storylines of the approaching Dominion War, and the well-developed relationships shown between Jake Sisko and his father and between Jake and Nog; he gave the episode a rating of 9 out of 10. Zack Handlen, writing for The A.V. Club in 2013, also gave the episode a favorable review; he praises it as a comedic episode that provides meaningful stakes for the characters in the midst of dramatic storylines.

In 2019, CBR ranked "In the Cards" the 18th funniest episode of the Star Trek franchise.
