= Once a Hero =

1987 American television series

- Genre: Action-adventure; Sitcom
- Created by: Dusty Kay
- Directed by: Kevin Hooks; Kevin Inch; Claudia Weill; Harry Hurwitz
- Starring: Jeff Lester; Milo O'Shea; Robert Forster; Josh Blake; Caitlin Clarke
- Composer: Dennis Dreith
- Country of origin: United States
- Original language: English
- No. of seasons: 1
- No. of episodes: 7 (4 unaired)

Production
- Executive producer: Dusty Kay
- Producers: Ira Steven Behr; Paul Pompian
- Editors: Stuart Bass; Michael Berman
- Running time: 60 minutes
- Production companies: Garden Party Productions; New World Television

Original release
- Network: ABC
- Release: September 19 – October 3, 1987

Once a Hero is an American action-adventure television series created by Dusty Kay that aired on ABC from September 19 until October 3, 1987. Produced by Garden Party Productions and New World International, the series stars Jeff Lester as Captain Justice, a comic book superhero who crosses from his fictional world into reality but loses his superpowers in the process, and Milo O'Shea as Abner Bevis, the aging comic book artist who created him. Robert Forster co-stars as Gumshoe, a 1940s detective character who accompanies Captain Justice into the real world, with Caitlin Clarke as Emma Greely. Although seven episodes were produced, ABC cancelled the series after airing only three due to poor ratings.

== Premise ==
Abner Bevis (Milo O'Shea) is the creator of a comic-book superhero called Captain Justice. Lately Bevis is in a rut and repeating old storylines, and children have lost interest in the comic, so the comic's owners want to kill off the title. Even the characters in the book's fictional world of Pleasantville have started to notice that their lives are repeating themselves, and the lack of reader interest is causing characters to start fading.

Captain Justice (Jeff Lester) decides to cross the Forbidden Zone into the real world, where he becomes a real human being with no superpowers. Also crossing over is Gumshoe (Robert Forster), the embodiment of generic private detectives, who's looking out for Justice. The Captain's attempts to fight real-world criminals renew interest in the comic, and the owners agree not to cancel it; also, Bevis is inspired to make it more contemporary.

Adding to the stories is suspicious newspaper reporter Emma Greely (Caitlin Clarke), who keeps snooping around. Her troubled and precocious son Woody (Josh Blake) knows the truth about Captain Justice, but she doesn't.

== Cast ==
- Milo O'Shea as Abner Bevis
- Jeff Lester as Captain Justice/Brad Steele
- Robert Forster as Gumshoe
- Caitlin Clarke as Emma Greely
- Josh Blake as Woody Greely
- David Wohl as Edward "Eddie" Kybo

== Production ==
Jim Turner was initially cast as Captain Justice, he "was cast against type, a small, skinny guy ... It was supposed to be a joke", but when the producers became worried he might not be suitable as the lead, the role was recast with Jeff Lester. A pilot with Turner had been shot, and writer Ira Steven Behr suggested that key advertising-agency executives had seen the abandoned version of the pilot, which caused bad word-of-mouth for the show, ultimately dooming it.

== Episodes ==
Seven episodes were created, but only the first three of them were aired in the United States.

No.	Title	Directed by	Written by	Original release date	Prod. code
1	"Believers"	Claudia Weill & Kevin Inch	Dusty Kay	September 19, 1987	587600
In Pleasantville Captain Justice notices many of his adventures are repeats of old storylines, because children have lost interest in his comic. Captain Justice (Jeff Lester) decides to cross the Forbidden Zone into the real world, where he becomes a real human being with no superpowers. Also crossing over is a detective character called Gumshoe (Robert Forster), who's looking out for Justice.
2	"Triangle"	Win Phelps	Carolyn Shelby & Christopher Ames	September 26, 1987	587601
Captain Justice's girlfriend Rachel Kirk crosses the Forbidden Zone into the real world, and Abner is stunned at her resemblance to his late wife.
3	"The Return of Lazarus"	Kevin Hooks	Ira Steven Behr	October 3, 1987	587602
Captain Justice's arch-enemy Victor Lazarus (Richard Lynch) crosses the Forbidden Zone into the real world, and initially resumes his fight with C.J., but in time questions whether he wants to be a villain, or is he just written that way.
4	"Things Get Ugly"	N/A	Carolyn Shelby & Christopher Ames	Unaired	587603
A new Captain Justice movie is being made, and the actor who played C.J. on television (Adam West) now earns a living by making public appearances as that character is being sued by the studio to prevent him making any further appearances. When he crosses the Forbidden Zone into Pleasantville, he gains C.J.'s powers. NOTE: This episode echoed the situation with The Legend of the Lone Ranger and the Clayton Moore lawsuit.
5	"Manos Arriba, Mrs. Greely"	N/A	Richard Manning & Hans Beimler	Unaired	587604
Emma and Gumshoe travel to Latin America in hopes of recovering a roll of film from Eddie's wife (Fran Drescher) which incriminates a mobster.
6	"Remember the Cottonwood"	N/A	Richard Manning & Hans Beimler	Unaired	587605
Heroes from the Battle of the Alamo return to aid C.J. in his fight for justice; although they are not fictional characters, so many legends have built up around them, they exist in the Forbidden Zone as well.
7	"Thank You, Captain Justice"	N/A	Jim Wells	Unaired	587606

== Reception ==
Many ABC stations preempted the show's first episode with Star Trek: The Next Generation, which they correctly decided would be more successful after watching the ABC show; one station stated that "Once a Hero is gone". Although widely promoted, the series was a ratings failure, and was cancelled after three episodes were broadcast.

== In other media ==
=== Comics ===
Marvel Comics published a comic book spin-off, Captain Justice, but this too was short-lived and was cancelled after two issues.
