= Empok Nor =

- Star Trek: Deep Space Nine episode
- Episode no.: Season 5 Episode 24
- Directed by: Mike Vejar
- Story by: Bryan Fuller
- Teleplay by: Hans Beimler
- Production code: 522
- Original air date: May 19, 1997

Guest appearances
- Andrew J. Robinson as Garak; Aron Eisenberg as Nog; Tom Hodges as Pechetti; Andy Milder as Boq'ta; Marjean Holden as Stolzoff; Jeffrey King as Amaro

Episode chronology
← Previous "Blaze of Glory"	Next → "In the Cards"
- Star Trek: Deep Space Nine season 5

"Empok Nor" is the 122nd episode of the television series Star Trek: Deep Space Nine, the 24th episode of the fifth season. The episode aired on television on May 19, 1997. The screenplay was written by Bryan Fuller and Hans Beimler, and it was directed by Mike Vejar.

Set in the 24th century, the series follows the adventures of the crew of Deep Space Nine, a space station near the planet Bajor, as the Bajorans recover from a brutal decades-long occupation by the imperialistic Cardassians. In this episode, Miles O'Brien, Deep Space Nine's chief of operations, leads a team to the abandoned Cardassian space station Empok Nor to salvage equipment for Deep Space Nine. To accomplish this mission, it is necessary to overcome booby traps, including two Cardassian soldiers lying in wait on the station to eliminate intruders.

== Plot ==
Chief O'Brien needs to replace a failing component of Deep Space Nine's machinery. The only way to obtain a replacement is by salvaging it from Empok Nor, an abandoned Cardassian space station built to the same design as Deep Space Nine. The salvage team consists of O'Brien, Cardassian ex-spy Garak, cadet Nog, engineers Pechetti and Boq'ta, and security officers Stolzoff and Amaro. As Cardassians routinely booby-trap abandoned facilities against non-Cardassian intruders, Garak is brought along to help disarm the security measures, and Garak uses the time to bring up O'Brien and his actions as a soldier on Setlik III against Cardassians.

On the abandoned station, the team discovers two empty and recently deactivated stasis tubes, and a third one with a dead Cardassian soldier, whose uniform marks him as a member of an elite and ruthless battalion. Suddenly, the away team's runabout detaches from the station and explodes, stranding them inside with no means to send for help and under threat from the two recently-awoken Cardassians. The team splits into groups to continue the salvage and attempt to establish communications.

The Cardassian soldiers methodically ambush and eliminate Pechetti and Stolzoff. Garak decides to go on the offensive and track down the enemy soldiers himself. He returns after killing one of them, and relays his discovery that the soldiers had been subjected to psychotropic drugs which amplify their natural xenophobic tendencies. The second soldier ambushes Boq'ta, but Garak emerges and kills him before he can kill Amaro, only to then stab Amaro himself.

O'Brien and Nog discover Amaro, who tells them what happened, before dying from his injuries. O'Brien realizes Garak has been affected by the same drug as the soldiers, and sets out to stop him. Garak captures Nog, using him to draw O'Brien out. O'Brien consents to lay down his weapons and face Garak in hand-to-hand combat, but disables him with his own trap, having rigged his phaser to explode.

The three are rescued after collecting the parts they needed. Back on DS9, O'Brien visits Garak in the infirmary. Garak expresses his sincere regret over his actions; O'Brien informs him there will be an inquest, but it will be made clear that Garak was not responsible for his actions. Garak remarks that he was lucky the phaser did not kill him, but O'Brien admits that he had intended for it to do just that.

== Production ==
=== Writing ===
This episode was one of the first written by Bryan Fuller, who went to write dozens more episodes in the Star Trek franchise. Other series he wrote for include Star Trek: Voyager and Star Trek: Discovery. Fuller got his start as a writer through the open submission policy of Star Trek at that time, and his submission for a Deep Space Nine plot was accepted. After his second script for DS9 was accepted, he was hired as a writer for Star Trek: Voyager.

=== Cast ===
In addition to the regular Deep Space Nine cast, this episode features recurring characters Garak, played by Andrew J. Robinson, and Nog, played by Aron Eisenberg. Guest stars include Tom Hodges as Pechetti, Andy Milder as Boq'ta, Marjean Holden as Stolzoff and Jeffrey King as Amaro.

== Reception ==
Keith DeCandido of Tor.com gave the episode four out of ten. Zack Handlen of The A.V. Club called it "creepy, thrilling, and horrifying by turns; the script’s only real failing is in a refusal to go much deeper under the surface of its premise than tension requires."

Den of Geek ranked this episode the 13th best written by Bryan Fuller.

In 2017, this episode was noted as featuring scary or eerie Star Trek content by H&I. In 2018, The Gamer ranked this one of the top 25 creepiest episodes of all Star Trek. They categorized this episode as a psychological thriller and slasher genre.

In 2019, Screen Rant ranked this the tenth best episode for the character Nog, noting how he helps Miles O'Brien despite being a hostage. In 2021, they ranked "Empok Nor" the seventh scariest episode of all Star Trek franchise television episodes, remarking that "Empok Nor" is one of the most unsettling Star Trek episodes of all time.
