= Glitch! =

1988 film by Nico Mastorakis

- Directed by: Nico Mastorakis
- Written by: Nico Mastorakis
- Produced by: Perry Husman; Isabelle Mastorakis; Nico Mastorakis
- Starring: Will Egan; Steve Donmyer; Julia Nickson; Dick Gautier; Ted Lange
- Cinematography: Peter C. Jensen
- Edited by: Nico Mastorakis; George Rosenberg
- Music by: Thomas Marolda
- Distributed by: Omega Pictures; Academy Entertainment
- Release date: 1988
- Running time: 88 minutes
- Country: United States
- Language: English

Glitch! is a 1988 American comedy film directed by Nico Mastorakis. It involves two petty thieves who accidentally become casting directors of a film with a large number of beautiful girls, and later they must dodge the Mafia.

== Plot ==
Two thieves rob a large fancy house when the owner is away, but when a visitor mistakes them for the owner, and they find out about a casting party misscheduled for that day, they decide to stick around for fun. They have only one small problem, though. The real owners owe some bad dudes a lot of money, and they show up to collect it.

== Cast ==
- Will Egan as T.C.
- Steve Donmyer as Bo
- Bunty Bailey as Bimbo
- Julia Nickson as Michelle Wong
- Ji-Tu Cumbuka as Mookie
- Fernando Garzon as Paco Galino
- John Kreng as Lee
- Richard Gautier as Julius Lazar
- Ted Lange as Dubois
- Amy Lyndon as Missy
- Dallas Cole as Faye
