= Bunty Bailey =

British actress, model and dancer

- Born: Therese Bailey; 23 May 1964 (age 62); Camborne, Cornwall, England
- Occupations: Actress; model; dancer
- Years active: 1980–2008

Therese "Bunty" Bailey (born 23 May 1964) is an English former actress, model and dancer. Bunty started her career as a dancer in the dance group Hot Gossip in the early 1980s. She became known as the girl in the music videos of a-ha's singles "Take on Me" and "The Sun Always Shines on T.V." made in 1985. She is the former girlfriend of the band's lead vocalist, Morten Harket, whom she met while working on the videos.

She has since appeared in several films, with her most recent role in 2008 as a Gypsy Momma in Defunct. She lives in Wraysbury, Berkshire. She has also worked as a children's dance teacher at Wraysbury and Datchet Village Hall. Bunty has two sons, who were born in 1996 and 1997 respectively. In June 2009, she was one of the first people to take advantage of the UK government car scrappage scheme and was invited to breakfast with the prime minister at the time, Gordon Brown.

In September 2012, Bailey appeared as the mystery guest on Channel 4's Big Fat Quiz of the '80s, with her appearance in the a-ha videos being the correct answer.

== Filmography ==
- The Kenny Everett Show (early 1980s) with Hot Gossip
- "Talking Loud and Clear", OMD (1984)
- "Take On Me", a-ha (1985) as the Girl
- "The Sun Always Shines on TV", a-ha (1985) as the Girl
- "To Be A Lover", Billy Idol (1986) dancer
- Spellcaster (1987) as Cassandra Castle
- Dolls (1987) as Isabel Prange
- Rock and the Money-Hungry Party Girls (1988)
- Glitch! (1988) as Bimbo
- a-ha: Headlines and Deadlines – The Hits of a-ha (1991)
- Essential Music Videos: Hits of the 80s (2003)
- Video on Trial: "Episode No.2.6" (2006)
- Defunct (2008) as Gypsy Momma
