= Hired to Kill (1990 film) =

- Directed by: Nico Mastorakis
- Written by: Fred Perry
- Produced by: Nino Andro
- Starring: Brian Thompson; Oliver Reed; George Kennedy; José Ferrer; Michelle Moffett; Barbara Niven
- Cinematography: Andreas Bellis
- Edited by: Barry Zetlin
- Music by: Jerry Grant
- Release date: April 1990 (South Korea)
- Running time: 91 minutes
- Country: United States
- Language: English

Hired to Kill is an action and adventure film in which a group of mercenaries posing as a fashion modeling company attempt to release a captive rebel leader from a dictatorial régime. The film was first released to video in South Korea on 28 April 1990.

== Plot ==
Mercenary Frank Ryan (Brian Thompson) is summoned by US agent Thomas (George Kennedy) and given the assignment of releasing rebel leader Petros Rallis, (José Ferrer) who is being held prisoner in the country of Cypra, run by President Michael Bartos (Oliver Reed). To do this, Ryan assembles a group of female mercenaries and poses as a photo modeling company for a photography assignment. They are given a military guard for the photo-shoot but the guards are overcome by the group and together with Bartos' assistant Ana, (Michelle Moffett) they link up with other rebels, storm the prison where Rallis is being held and make their escape. At this time, Ryan realizes that he has been duped and finally confronts Thomas.

== Cast ==
- Brian Thompson as Frank Ryan
- Oliver Reed as Michael Bartos
- George Kennedy as Thomas
- José Ferrer as Rallis
- Michelle Moffett as Ana
- Barbara Niven as Sheila (credited as Barbara Lee Alexander)
- Jordana Capra as Joanna
- Kendall Conrad as Daphne
- Kim Lonsdale as Sivi
- Jude Mussetter as Dahlia
- Penelope Reed as Katrina
- David Sawyer as Louis
- Antzela Gerekou as Tara (credited as Angela Gerekou)

== Production ==
The filming took place mainly on the Greek island of Corfu. Stuntman Clint C. Carpenter was killed when a stunt involving a helicopter went wrong.
