= In the Cold of the Night =

1990 American erotic thriller film

- Promotional release poster
- Directed by: Nico Mastorakis
- Screenplay by: Nico Mastorakis; Fred C. Perry
- Story by: Nico Mastroakis
- Produced by: Nico Mastorakis
- Starring: Jeff Lester; Adrianne Sachs; Marc Singer; Brian Thompson; Shannon Tweed; John Beck; Tippi Hedren; David Soul
- Cinematography: Andreas Bellis
- Edited by: Barry Zetlin
- Production company: Omega Entertainment
- Release date: 1990
- Running time: 91 minutes
- Country: United States
- Language: English

In the Cold of the Night is a 1990 American erotic thriller film produced and directed by Greek filmmaker Nico Mastorakis, who also wrote the screenplay with Fred C. Perry. It stars Jeff Lester, Adrianne Sachs, Marc Singer, Brian Thompson, Shannon Tweed, John Beck, Tippi Hedren, and David Soul.

== Cast ==
- Jeff Lester as Scott Bruin
- Adrianne Sachs as Kimberly Shawn
- Marc Singer as Ken Strom
- Brian Thompson as Phil
- Shannon Tweed as Lena
- John Beck as Rudy
- Tippi Hedren as Clara
- David Soul as Dr. Frieberg

== Release and reception ==
According to the book The Naked Truth: Why Hollywood Doesn't Make X-Rated Movies by Kevin S. Sandler, In the Cold of Night was initially assigned an X rating by the Motion Picture Association of America just prior to their adoption of the NC-17 rating.

Brian Orndorf of Blu-ray.com called the film "ridiculous", and wrote that it "isn't nearly as fun as a could be, laboring through an uninteresting story with an uncomfortably dim protagonist." Rob Hunter of Film School Rejects also referred to the film as "ridiculous", and wrote that "it does overstay its welcome, though, as some elements are dragged out too long, but it's a small price to pay for the softcore fun and stellar B-movie cast."

== Home media ==
In March 2019, the film was restored in 4K and released on DVD and Blu-ray by Vinegar Syndrome.
