= Ninja Academy =

1988 film by Nico Mastorakis

- Directed by: Nico Mastorakis
- Written by: Jonathan D. Gift
- Produced by: Isabelle Mastorakis
- Starring: Will Egan; Gerald Okamura; Kelly Randall
- Cinematography: Steven Shaw
- Edited by: Barry Zetlin
- Music by: Jerry Grant
- Distributed by: Omega Entertainment
- Release dates: December 12, 1989 (Japan); January 1, 1990 (U.S.)
- Running time: 120 min.
- Country: United States
- Language: English

Ninja Academy is a 1989 Nico Mastorakis' comedy film starring Will Egan, Gerald Okamura, Kelly Randall, Michael David, Robert Factor, and Jeff Robinson. It is a low-budget B-movie similar to the Police Academy series of movies.

== Plot ==
Years ago, at a Japanese dojo, Sensei Yamazaki plans to award the dojo's golden nunchakus to one of his two star students, Addleman or Chiba. Chiba ultimately gets the upper hand and shows restraint. Addleman, unhappy with the defeat, cheap shots Chiba and knocks him out. Demanding Yamazaki give him the golden nunchakus, Yamazaki rebuffs the demand and explains even if Addleman won, Chiba's showing of remorse and restraint earned him the nunchakus. An upset Addleman leaves Japan.

Years later, Addleman operates the Beverly Hills Ninja Academy while Chiba runs the rival Topanga Ninjitsu-Ryu Academy. When a martial arts magazine ranks Topanga academy first and Beverly Hills second, a resentful Addleman dispatches his top student, Gonzalez, to infiltrate the rival school and uncover the secret behind its success.

Meanwhile, a group of new students are joining for a week of training at Topanga Ninjitsu-Ryu. They include the affluent Josh, whose father cuts him off unless he can prove himself at the dojo; best friends Suzie and Lynn, who are going because Suzie wants to impress a hunky Tai Chi expert she met at the beach; Philip, a secret agent whose unorthodox style caused too many unwanted deaths and must learn restraint; a mime who is constantly bullied and extorted by local thugs; George, a Rambo-wannabe; and Claude; a total klutz who goes to improve on his coordination.

Under the guidance of Chiba and his daughter Gayle (who Josh ends up getting a massive crush on), the students at first have trouble adapting to the Ninja way. A run leads to Josh finding and ogling a local nudist colony, in response Gayle throws and disciplines him for him not taking the training seriously. Eventually, the students begin to learn new skills. There are running gags including Claude's futile attempts to learn the ninja "disappear" trick with an assistant instructor; Josh constantly getting hit with a Kendo stick by Chiba at night; the assistant instructors engaging in a bonfire with hilarious results; and Philip using some of his secret agent gadgets. Josh eventually tells Gayle his feelings and she wants to reciprocate, but isn't ready yet. She also informs Josh that Chiba is her father, which he finds shocking at first.

One night, during his infiltration, Gonzalez takes a photo of the golden nunchakus but afterwards, spies of Gayle taking a bath. Gonzales leaves and, being alarmed, Gayle tells Chiba someone was around. When Addleman discovers that the #1 school is run by his old rival, he decides to wage war on Topanga Ninjitsu-Ryu. When Addleman and his team infiltrate and make their way to Chiba's school, the students begin to use their skills against some of Addleman's crew. This leads to Chiba's team joining the new students in combat against Addleman's ninjas.

A rematch is imminent between Addleman and Chiba. The two duke it out in front of their ninja crews with Chiba eventually getting the upper hand. However, as he is about to strike a fatal blow to Addleman, he looks at Gayle and remembers why he earned the golden nunchakus. Both ninja clans cheer for Chiba as they know he is a true Ninjitsu master. After the week is out, the new students have been given their new gis and are considered graduates.

The Mime and Lynn, who liked him when they met, finally decide to go on a date. Philip invites Suzie to dinner in Venice, Italy as they head to the airport. Claude, now earning the confidence and coordination he needed, finds a new role model in George, who before the ninja assault revealed his true colors as a coward before learning self-confidence himself. As for Josh, he decides to stay at the dojo as he has learned what it means to not only do things for himself without his father's money, but he and Gayle have become a couple. The next night, Chiba sneaks in to hit Josh again with the Kendo stick only for Josh to finally catch the stick and tell Chiba not to wake the others on the way out.

== Cast ==
- Will Egan as Josh
- Gerald Okamura as Chiba
- Kelly Randall as Gayle
- Michael David as Philip
- Jeff Robinson as The Mime
- Kathleen Stevens as Suzy
- Lisa Montgomery as Lynn
- Robert Factor as George
- Seth Foster as Addleman
- Jack Freiberger as Claude
- Art Camacho as Gonzales
- Al Lampkin as Mr. Keegan
- Michael Morano as Taxi Driver (as Michael Moreno)
- Deena Driskill as Phillip's Girl
- Orly Benyar as Phillip's Girl
- James Lew as Topanga Ninjitsu-Ryu Assistant Instructor
- Mark Dacascos as Topanga Ninjitsu-Ryu Student
- Karen Sheperd as Benverly Hills Ninja Academy Student
