= Primetime Emmy Award for Outstanding Lead Actor in a Limited or Anthology Series or Movie =

American television award

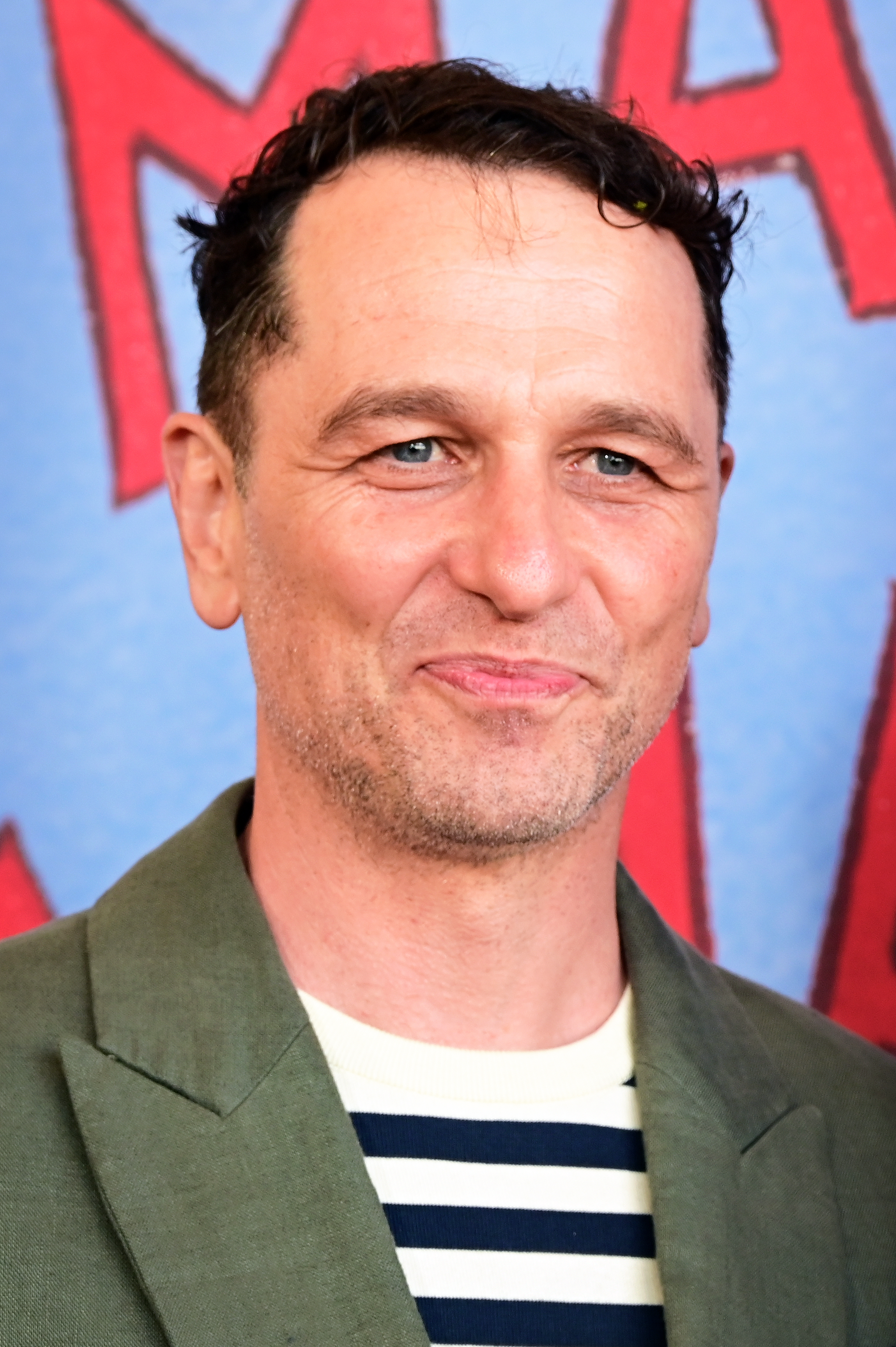
- The 2026 recipient: Matthew Rhys
- Awarded for: Outstanding Lead Actor in a Limited or Anthology Series or Movie
- Country: United States
- Presented by: Academy of Television Arts & Sciences
- First award: 1955
- Currently held by: Matthew Rhys, The Beast in Me (2026)
- Website: emmys.com

The Primetime Emmy Award for Outstanding Lead Actor in a Limited or Anthology Series or Movie is an award presented annually by the Academy of Television Arts & Sciences (ATAS). It is given in honor of an actor who has delivered an outstanding performance in a leading role on a television limited series or television movie for the primetime network season.

The award was first presented at the 7th Primetime Emmy Awards on March 7, 1955, to Robert Cummings, for his performance as Juror #8 on the Studio One episode "Twelve Angry Men". It has undergone several name changes, with the category split into two categories at the 25th Primetime Emmy Awards: Outstanding Lead Actor in a Special Program – Drama or Comedy; and Outstanding Lead Actor in a Limited Series. By the 31st Primetime Emmy Awards, the categories were merged into one, and it has since undergone several name changes, leading to its current title.

Since its inception, the award has been given to 59 actors. Matthew Rhys is the current recipient of the award, for his portrayal of Nile Jarvis on The Beast in Me. Laurence Olivier has won the most awards in this category, with four, while Hal Holbrook has received the most nominations for the award, on seven occasions.

== Winners and nominations ==
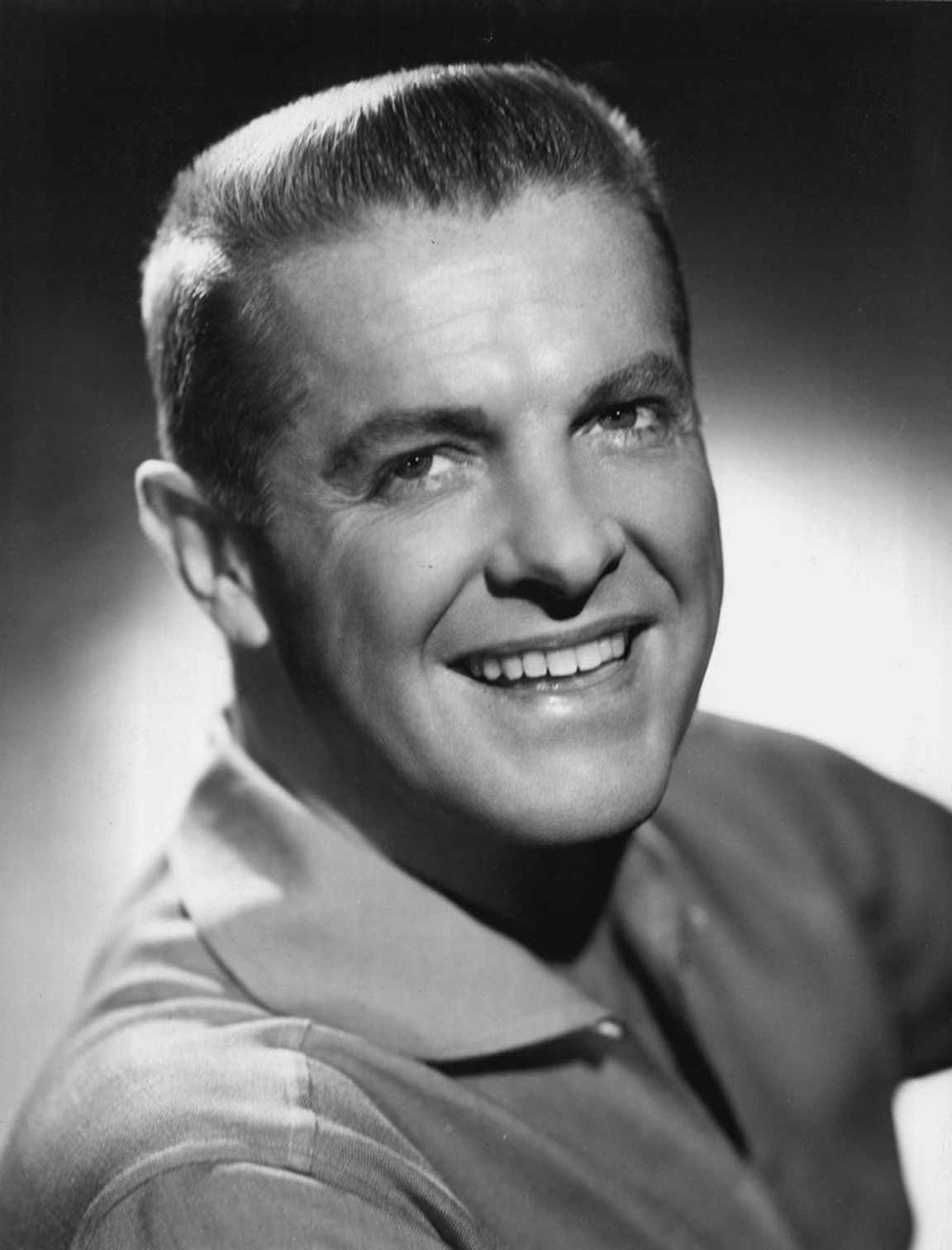
Robert Cummings was the first recipient of this award for his performance in Studio One (1955).

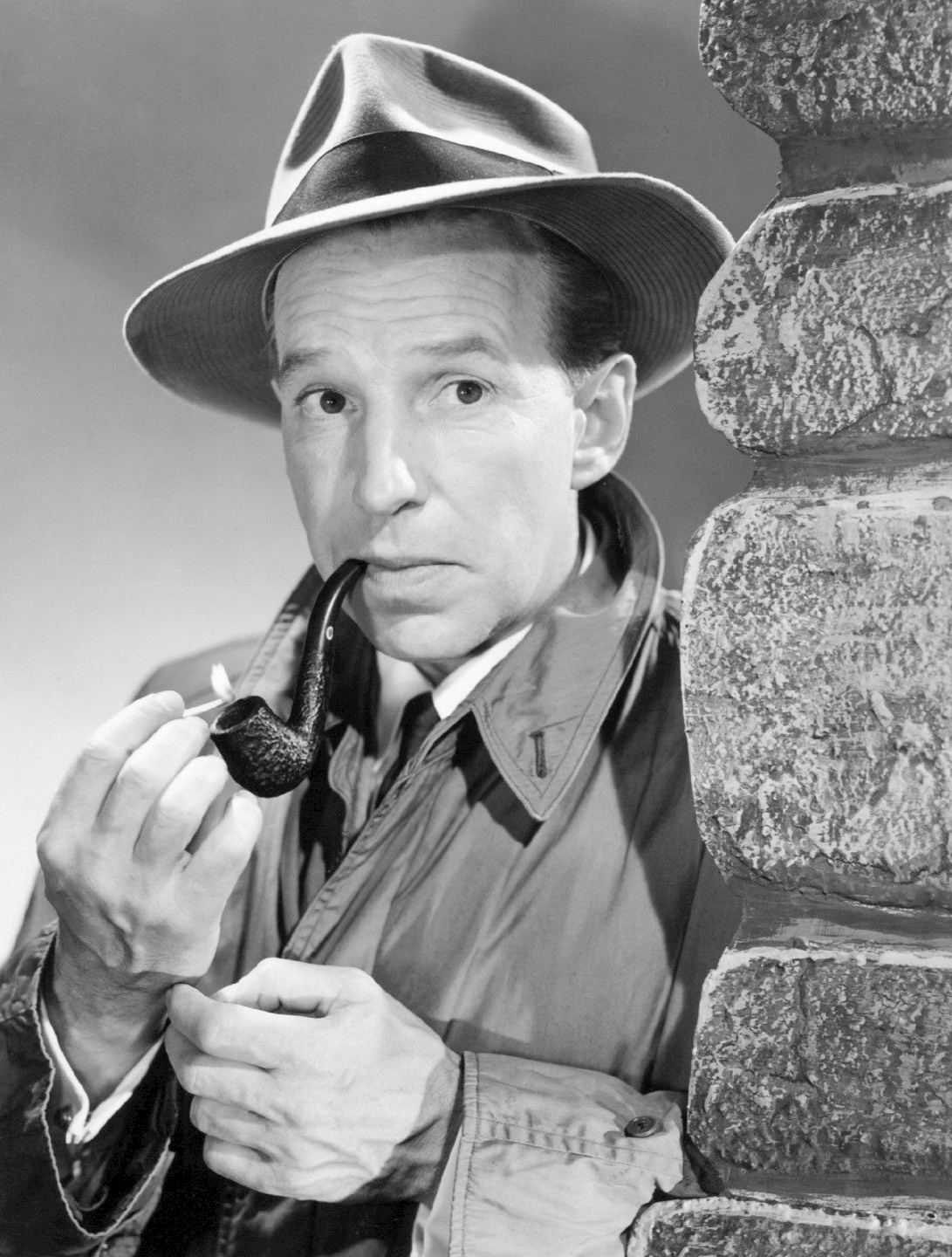
Lloyd Nolan won for Ford Star Jubilee (1956).

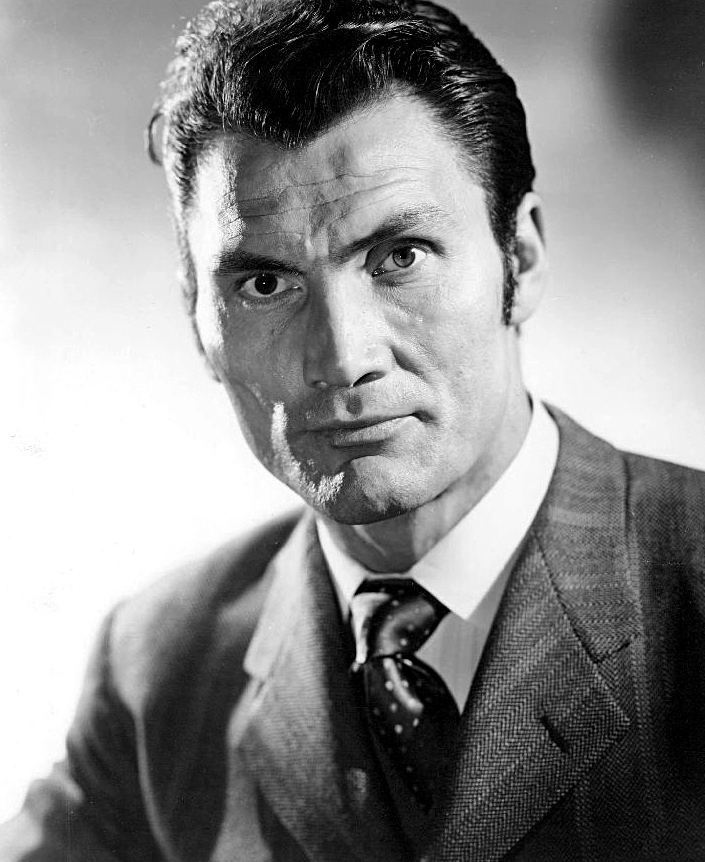
Jack Palance won for Playhouse 90 (1957).

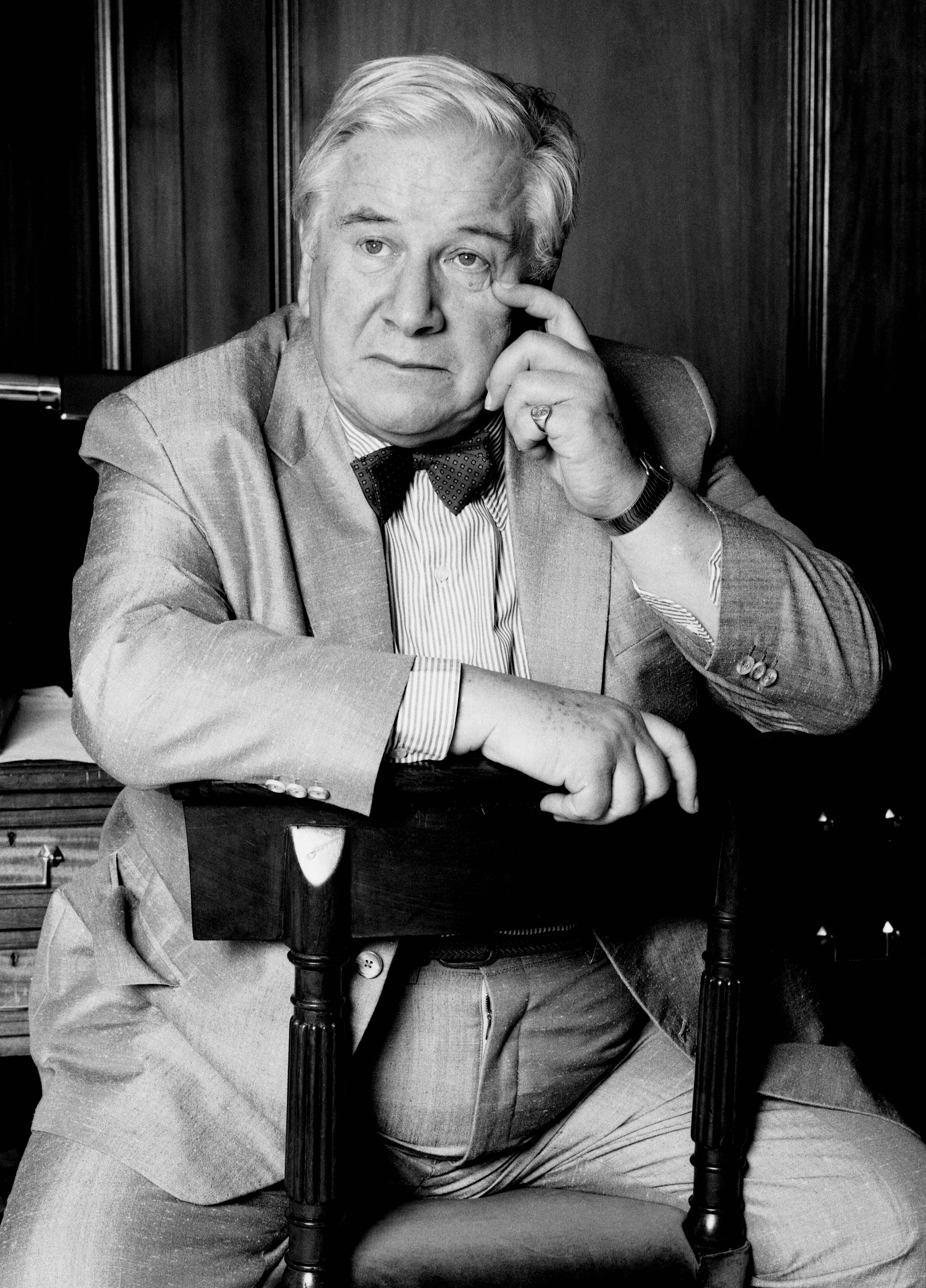
Peter Ustinov won thrice for Omnibus (1958), Hallmark Hall of Fame (1967), and A Storm in Summer (1975).

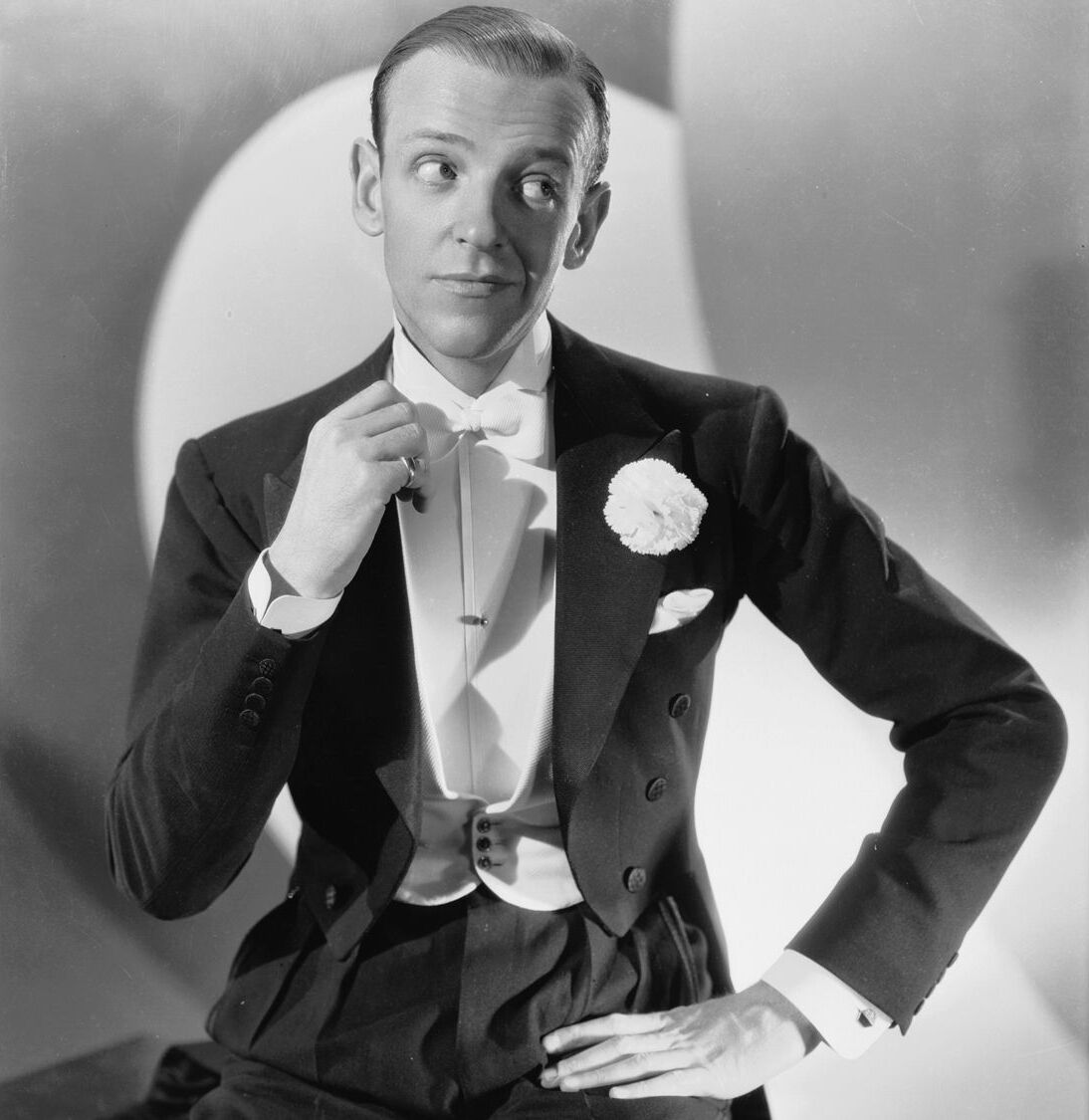
Fred Astaire won twice for An Evening with Fred Astaire (1959) and A Family Upside Down (1978).

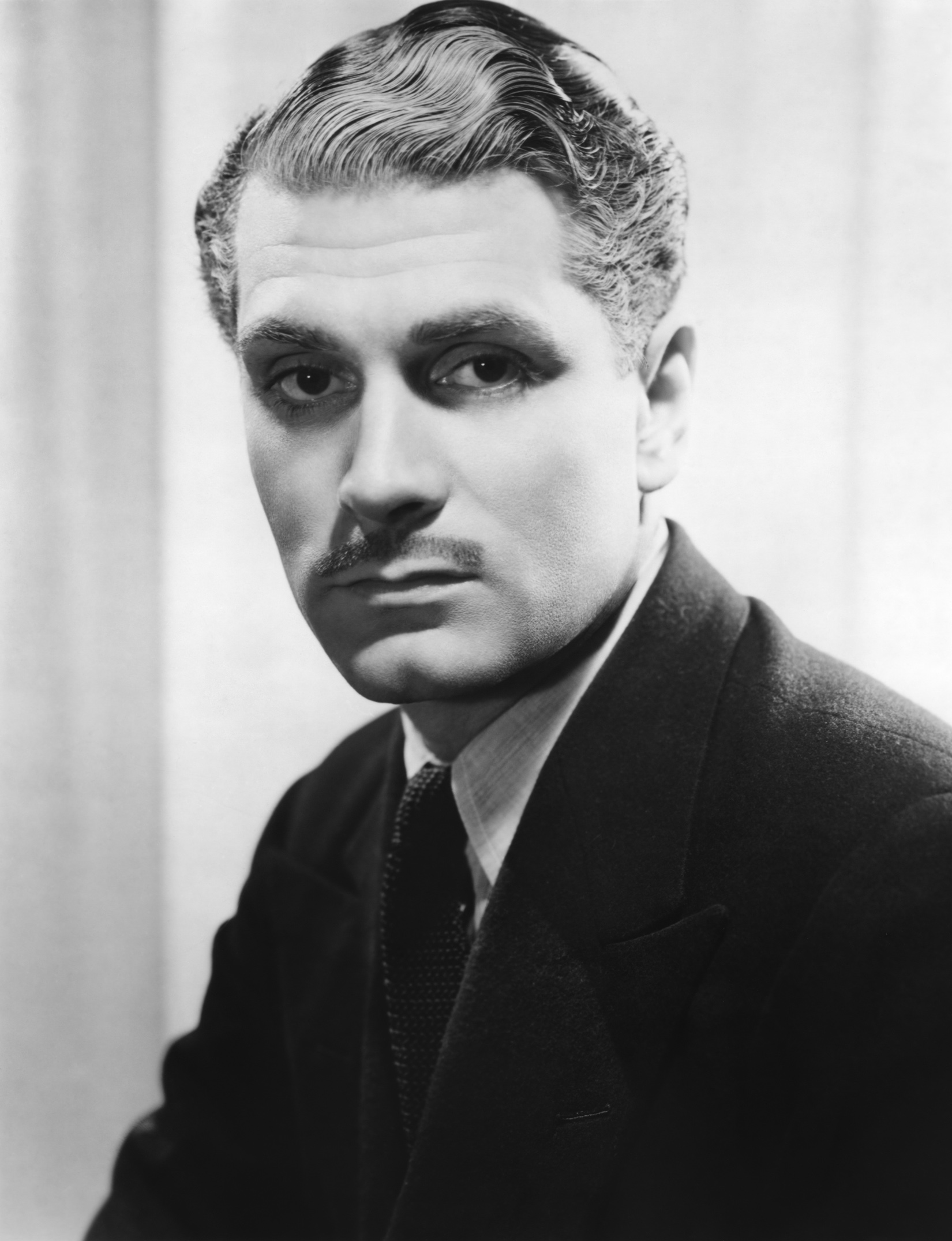
Laurence Olivier won four times for The Moon and Sixpence (1959), Long Day's Journey into Night (1973), Love Among the Ruins (1975), and King Lear (1983).

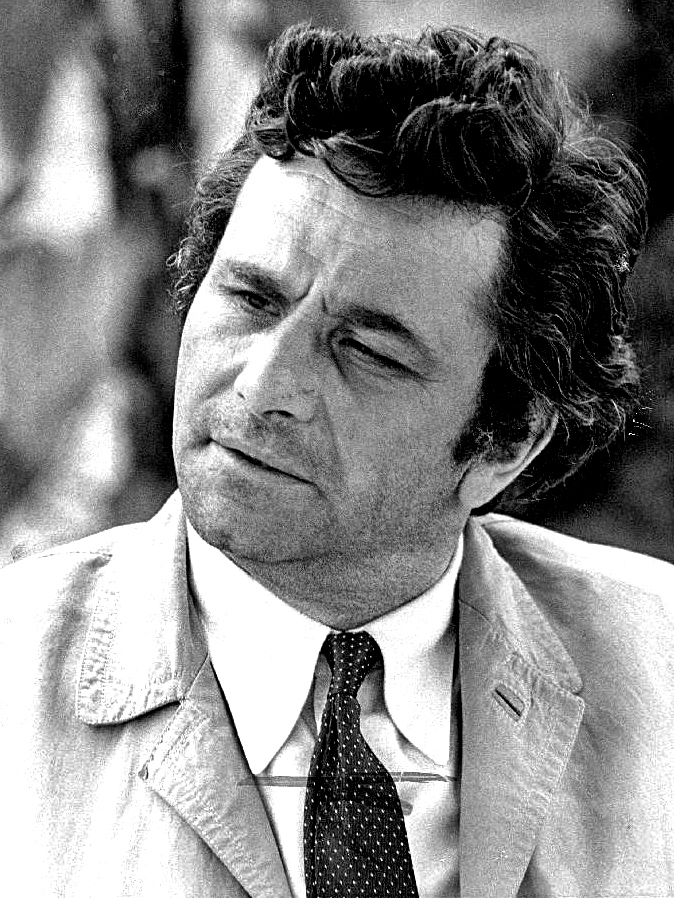
Peter Falk won twice for The Dick Powell Show (1962) and Columbo (1975).

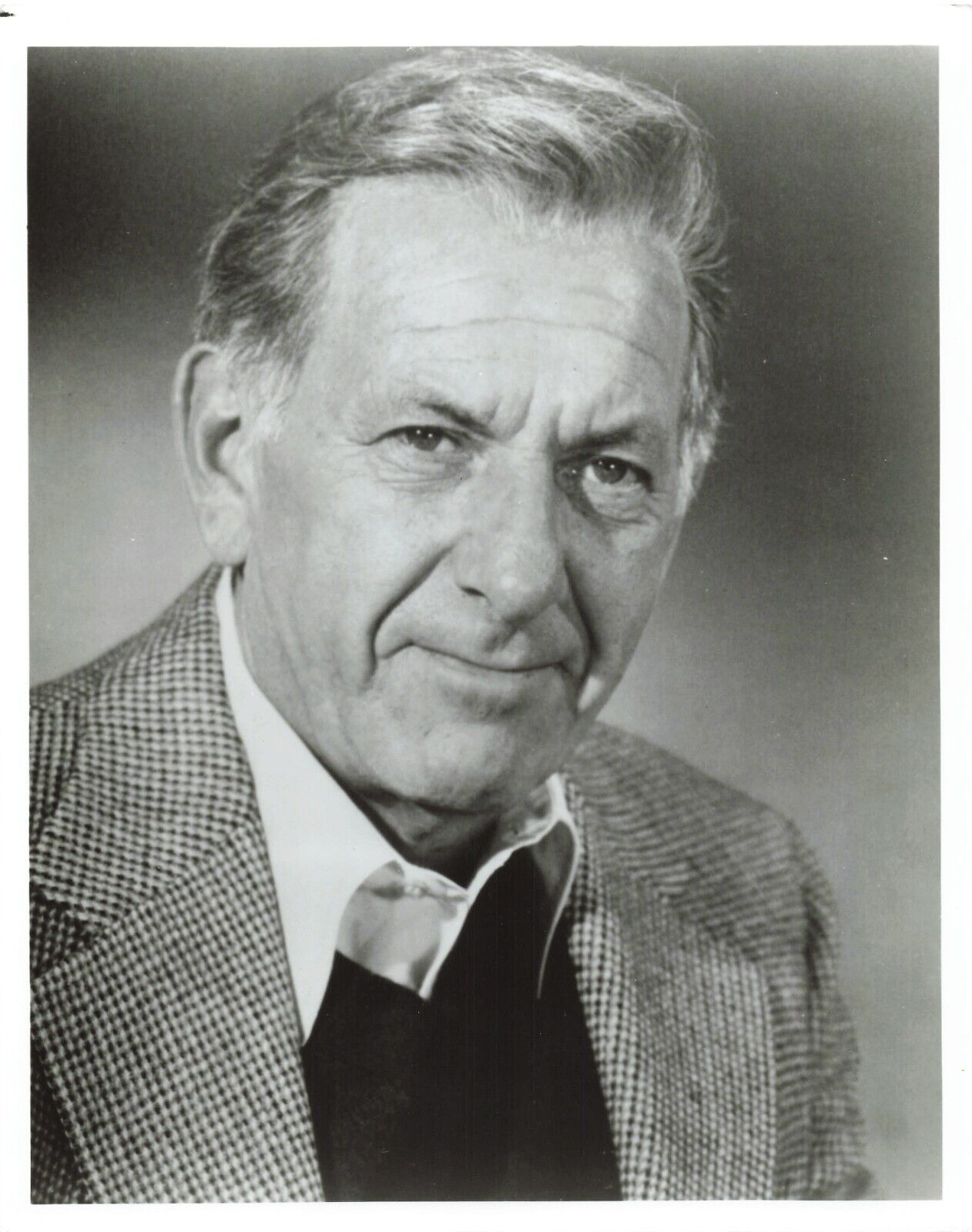
Jack Klugman won for The Defenders (1964).

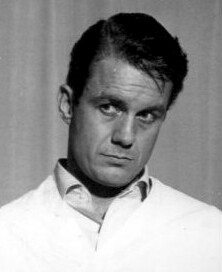
Cliff Robertson won for Bob Hope Presents the Chrysler Theatre (1966).

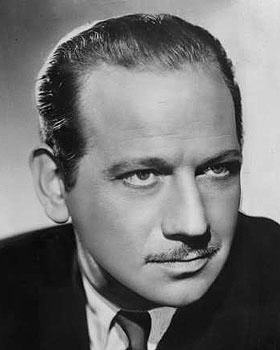
Melvyn Douglas won for CBS Playhouse (1968).

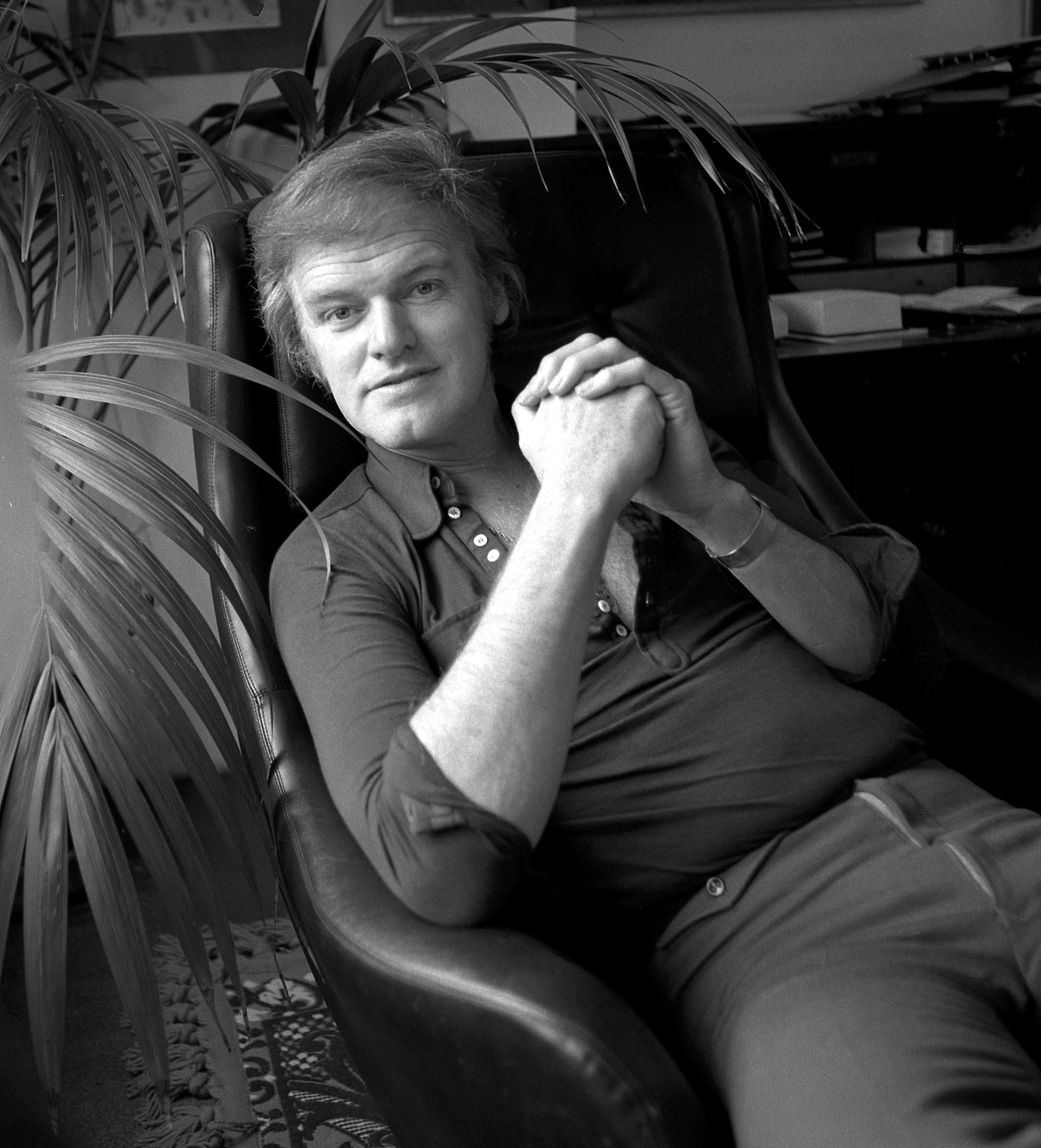
Keith Michell won for The Six Wives of Henry VIII (1972).

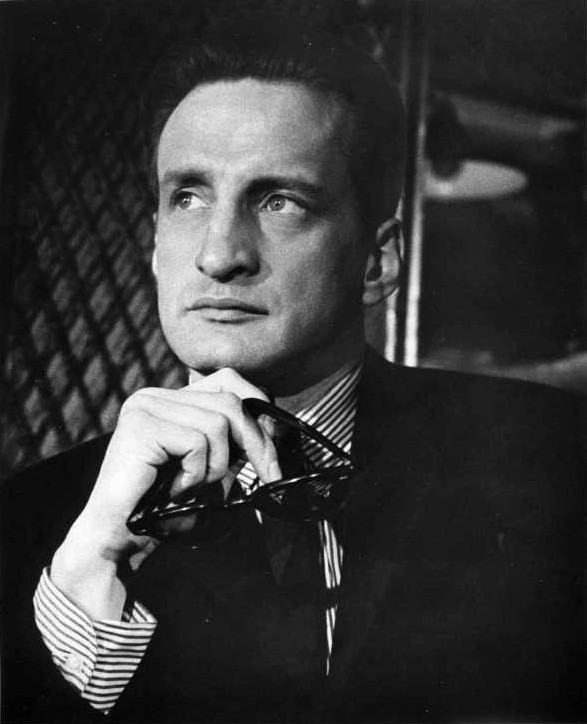
George C. Scott won for The Price (1973).

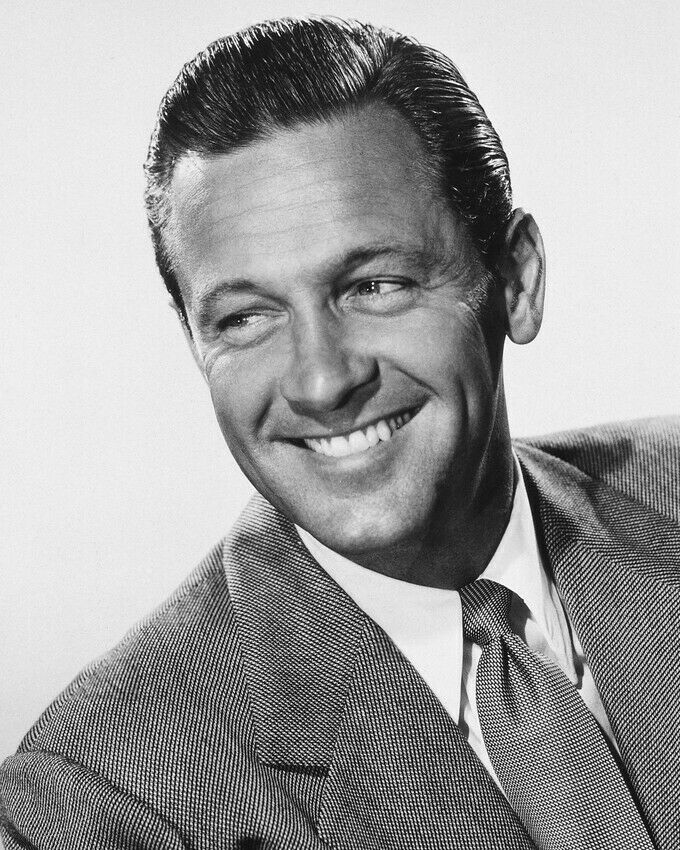
William Holden won for The Blue Knight (1974).

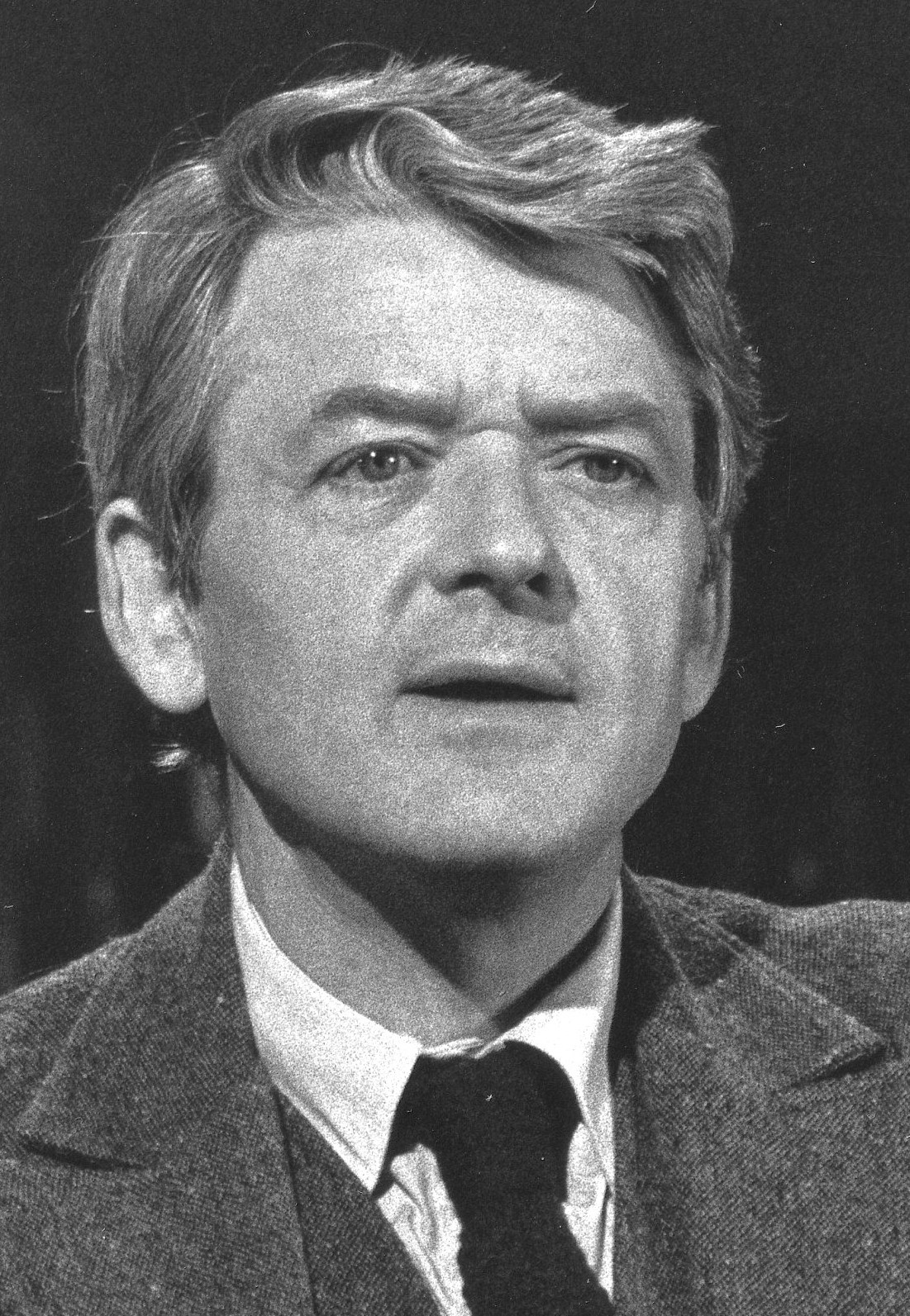
Hal Holbrook won for Pueblo (1974) and Sandburg's Lincoln (1976).

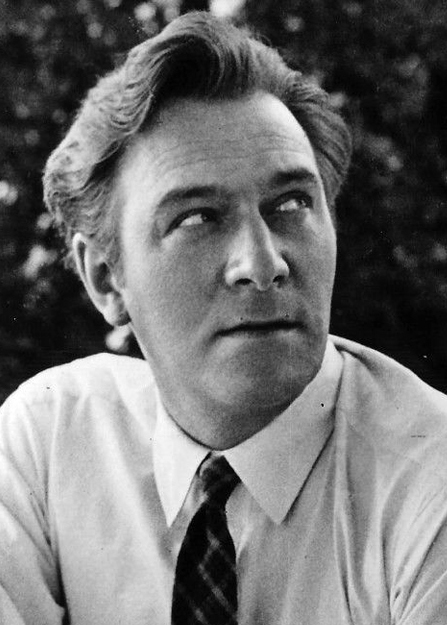
Christopher Plummer won for The Moneychangers (1977).

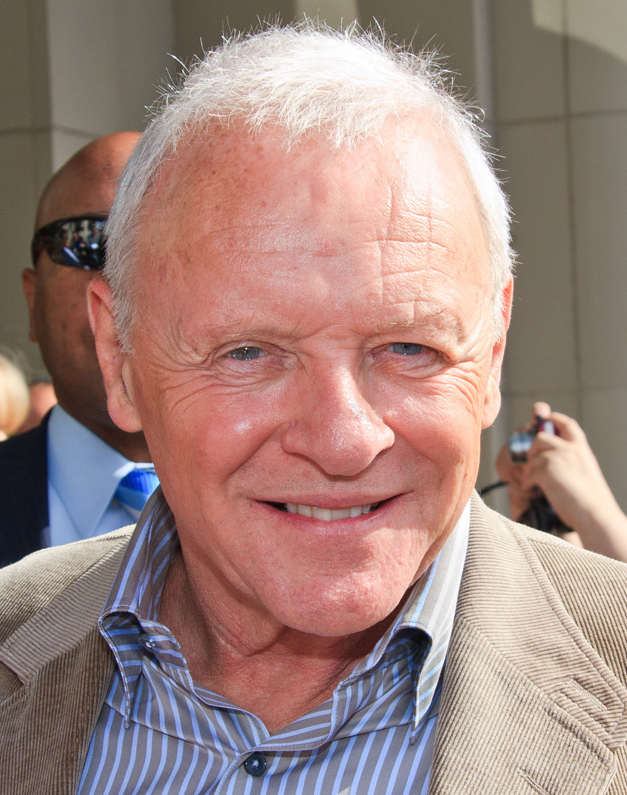
Anthony Hopkins won twice for The Lindbergh Kidnapping Case (1976) and The Bunker (1981).

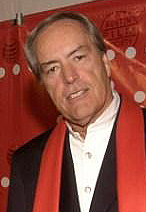
Powers Boothe won for Guyana Tragedy: The Story of Jim Jones (1980).

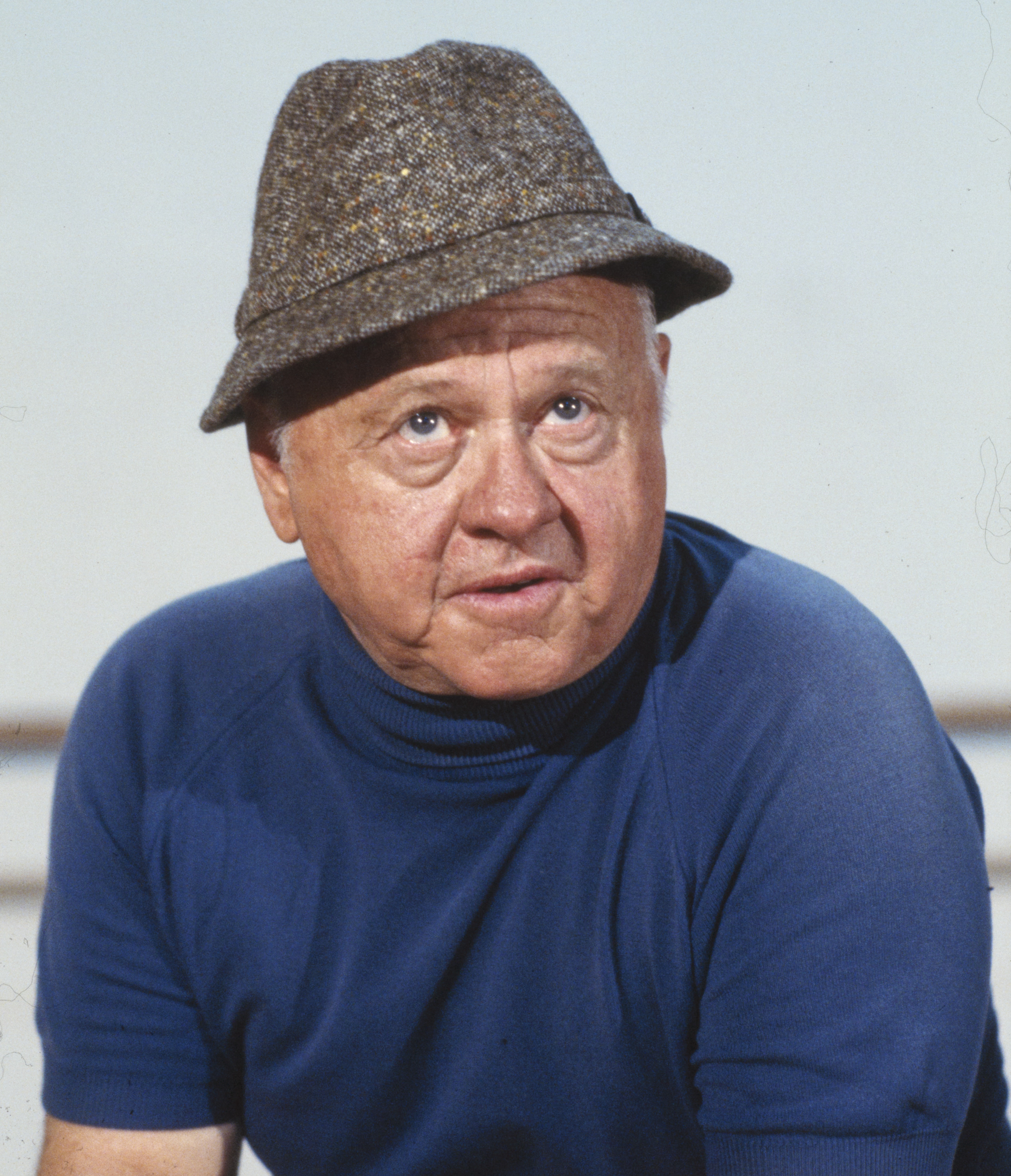
Mickey Rooney won for Bill (1981)

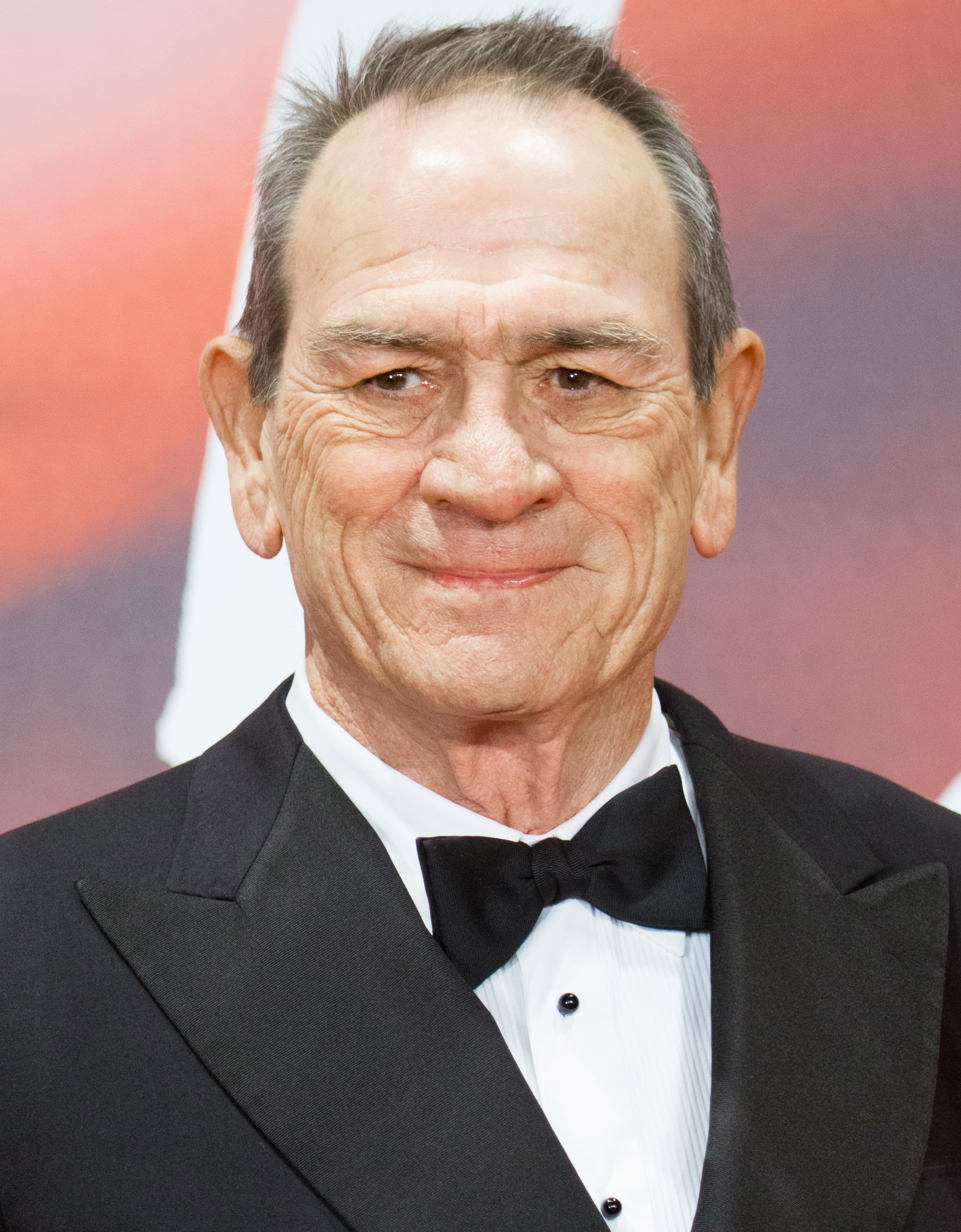
Tommy Lee Jones won for The Executioner's Song (1983).

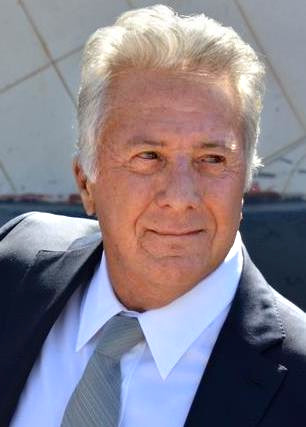
Dustin Hoffman won for Death of a Salesman (1985).

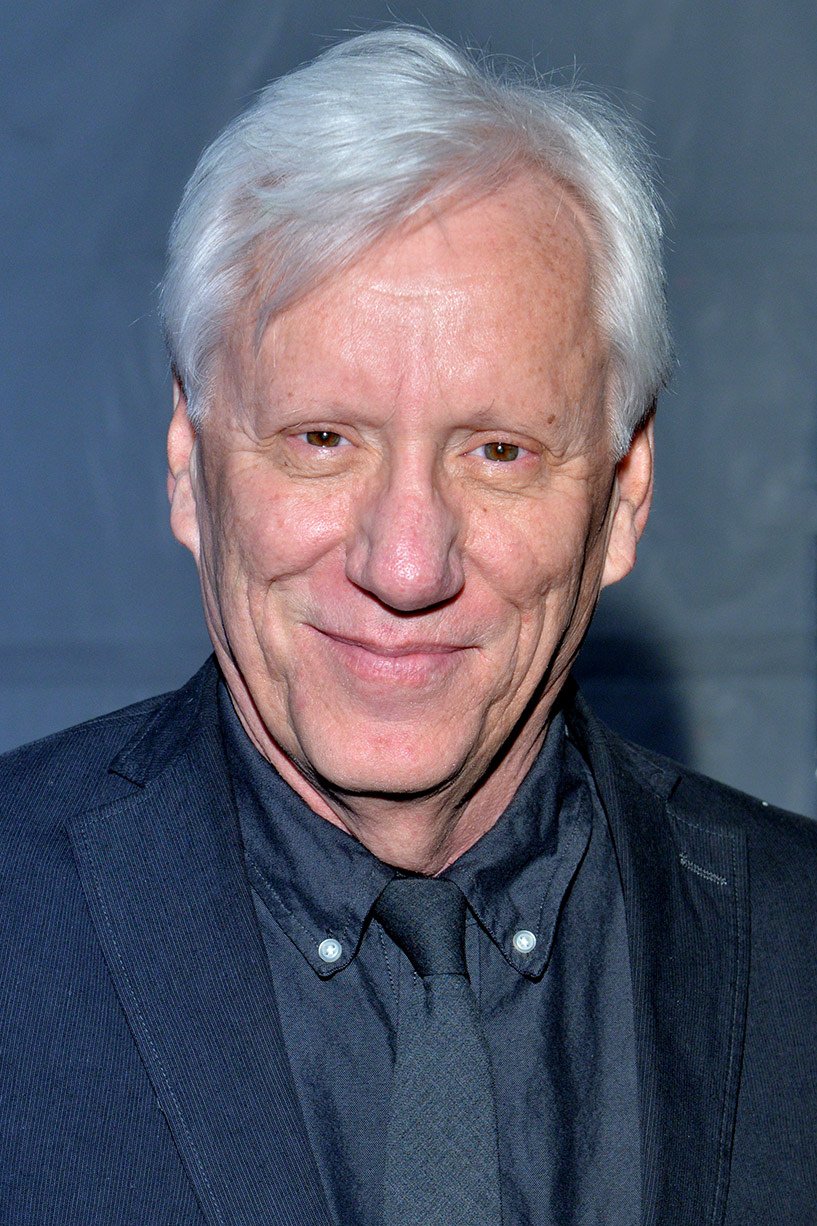
James Woods won twice for Promise (1986) and My Name Is Bill W. (1989).

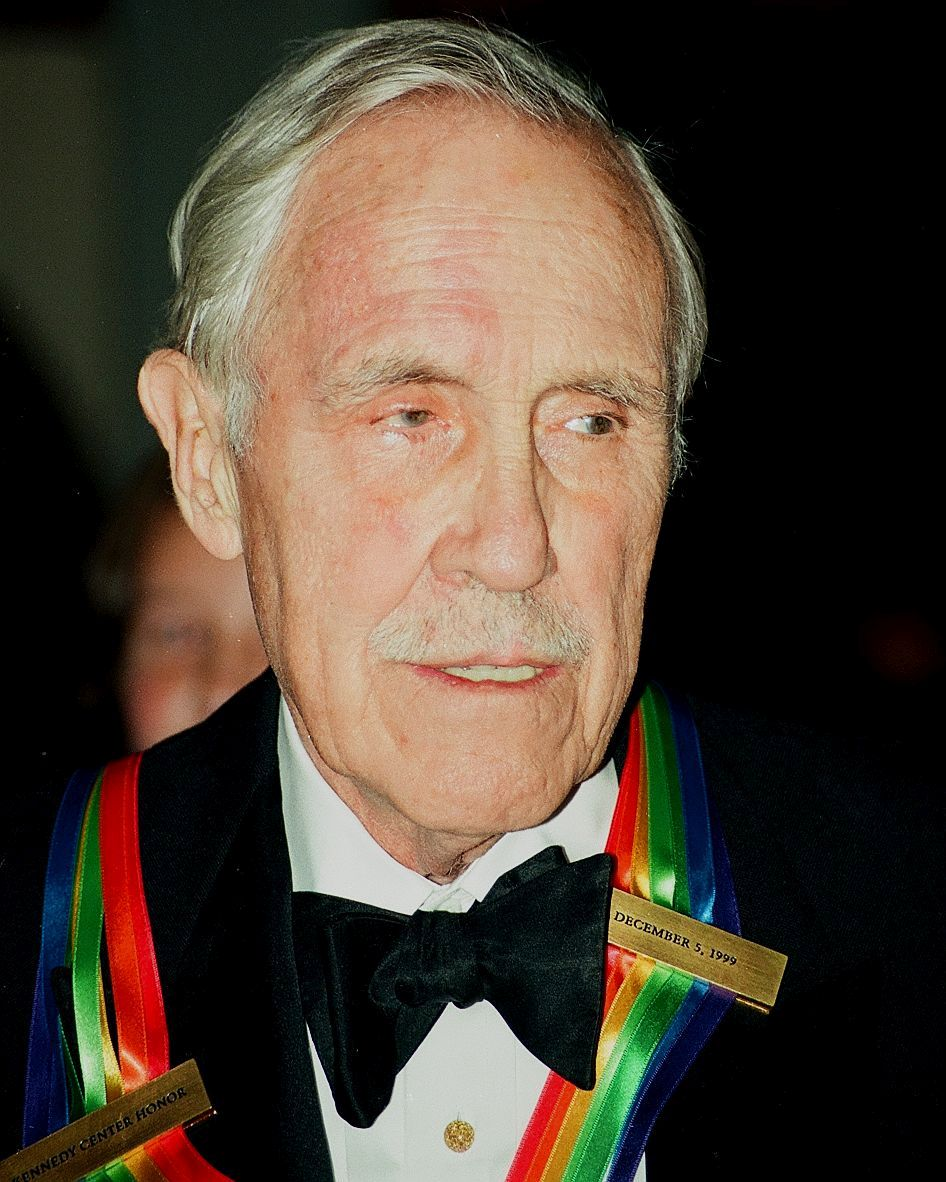
Jason Robards won for Inherit the Wind (1988).

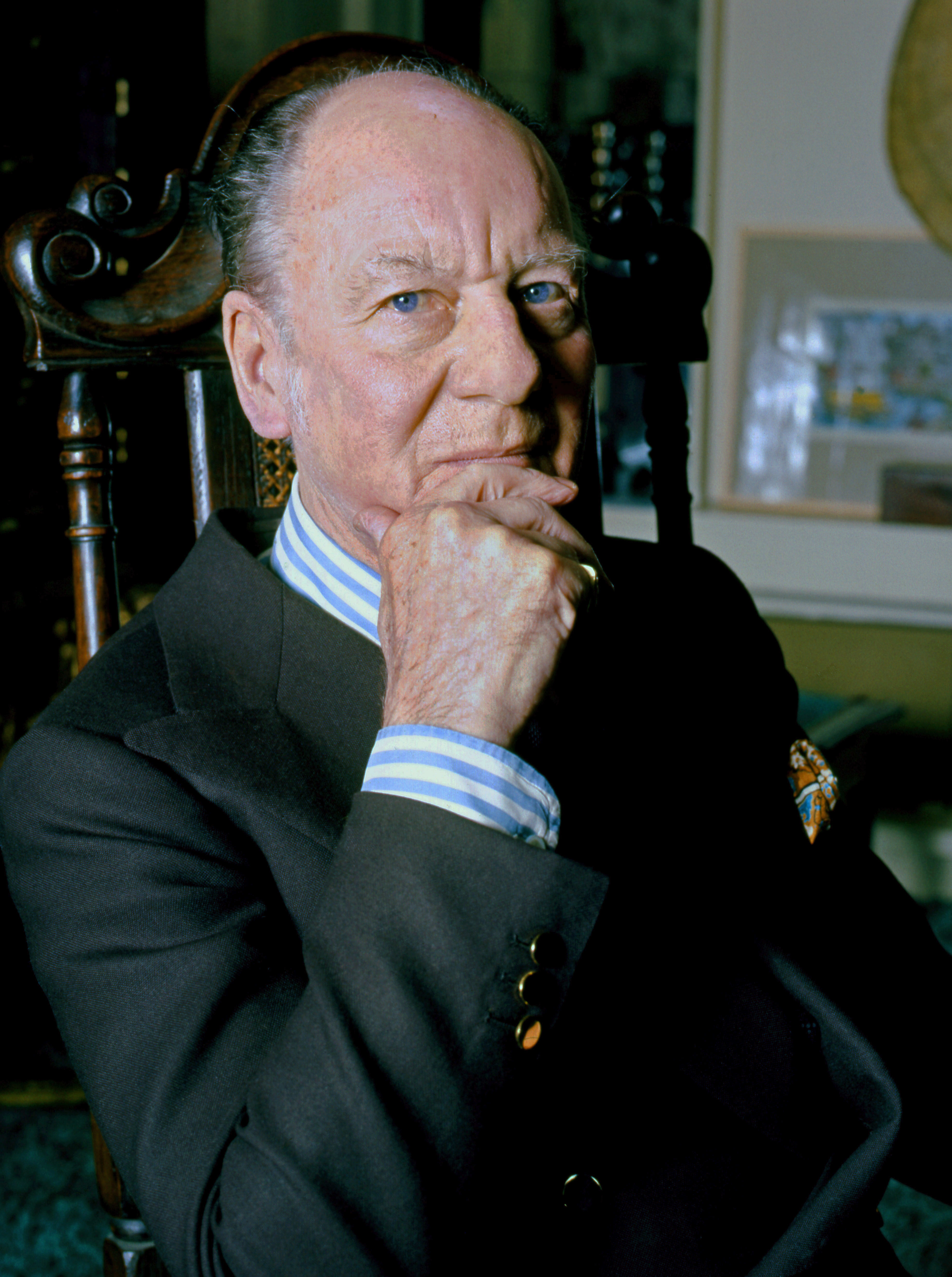
John Gielgud won for Summer's Lease (1991)

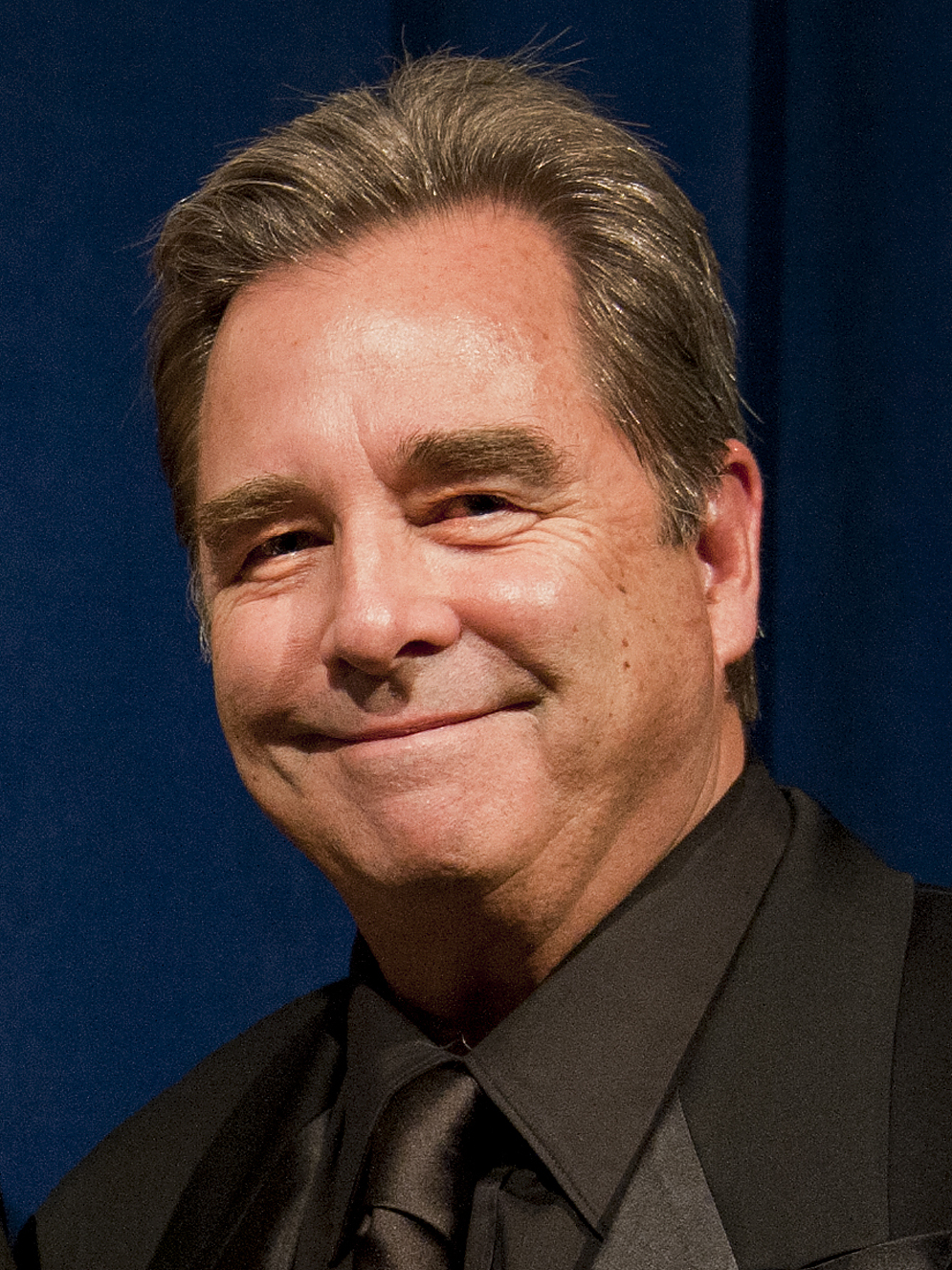
Beau Bridges won for Without Warning: The James Brady Story (1992).

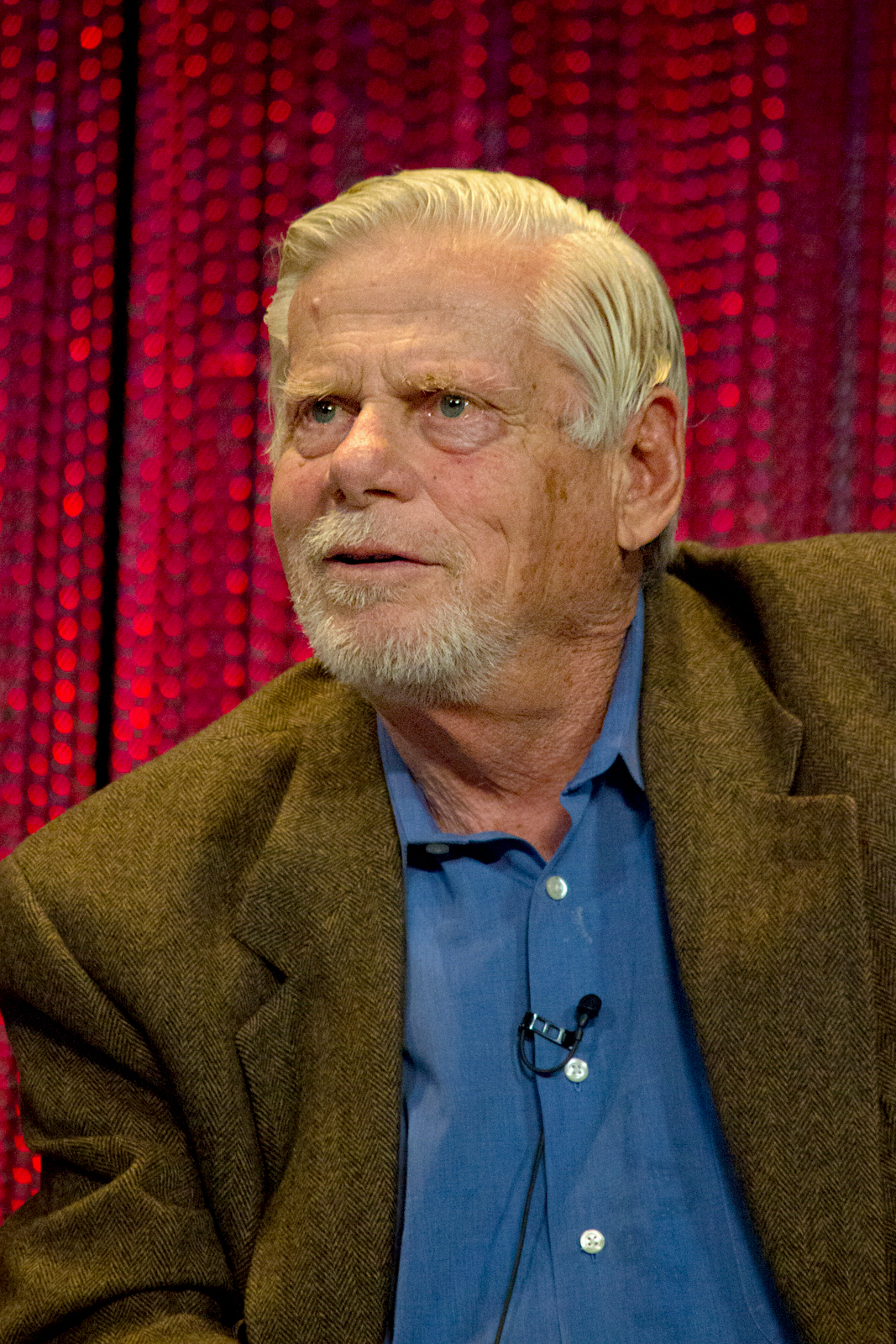
Robert Morse won for Tru (1993).

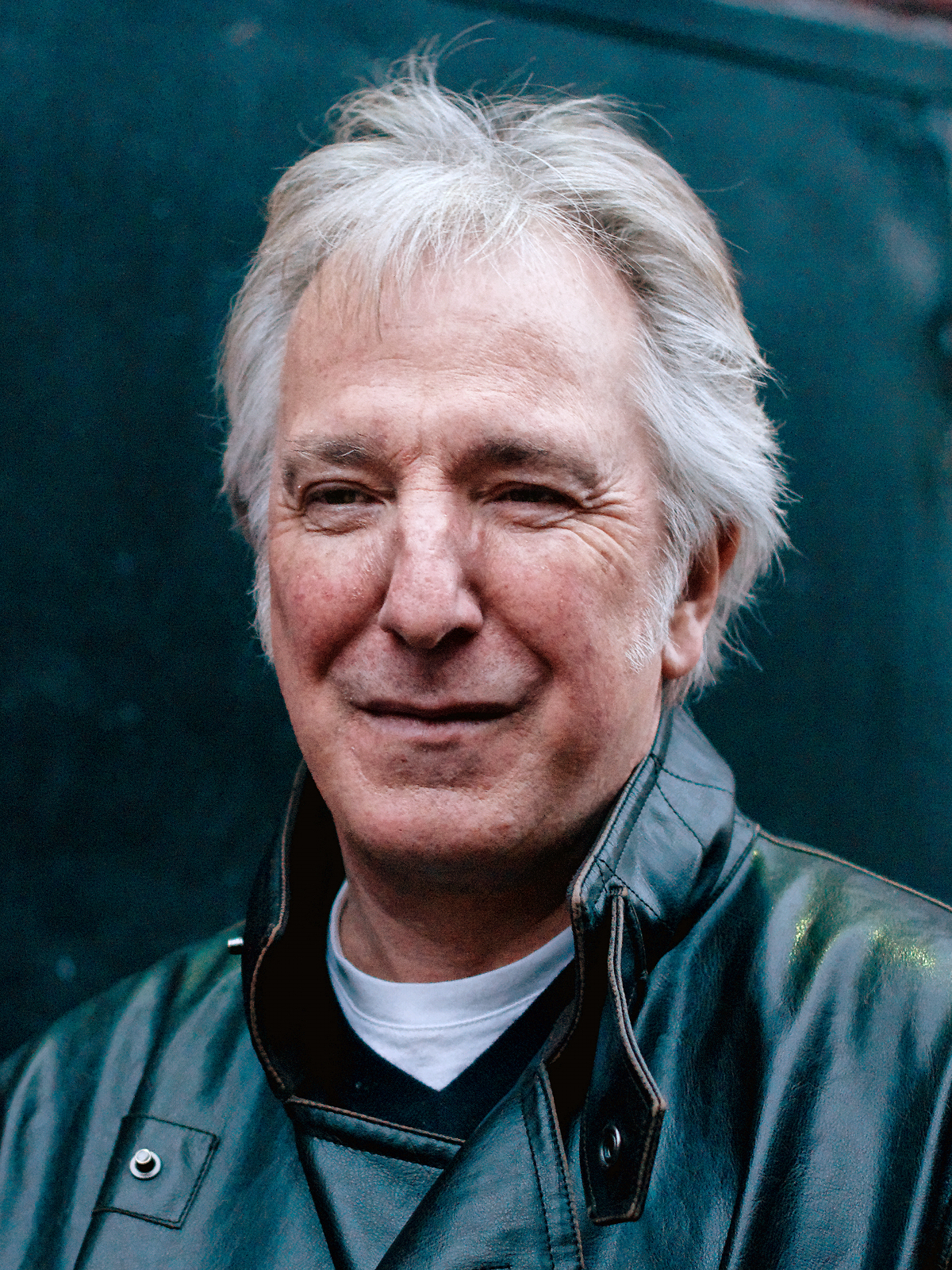
Alan Rickman won for Rasputin: Dark Servant of Destiny (1996).

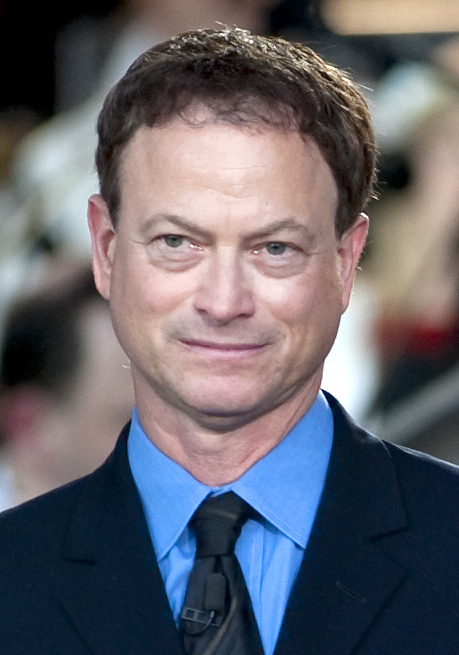
Gary Sinise won for George Wallace (1998).

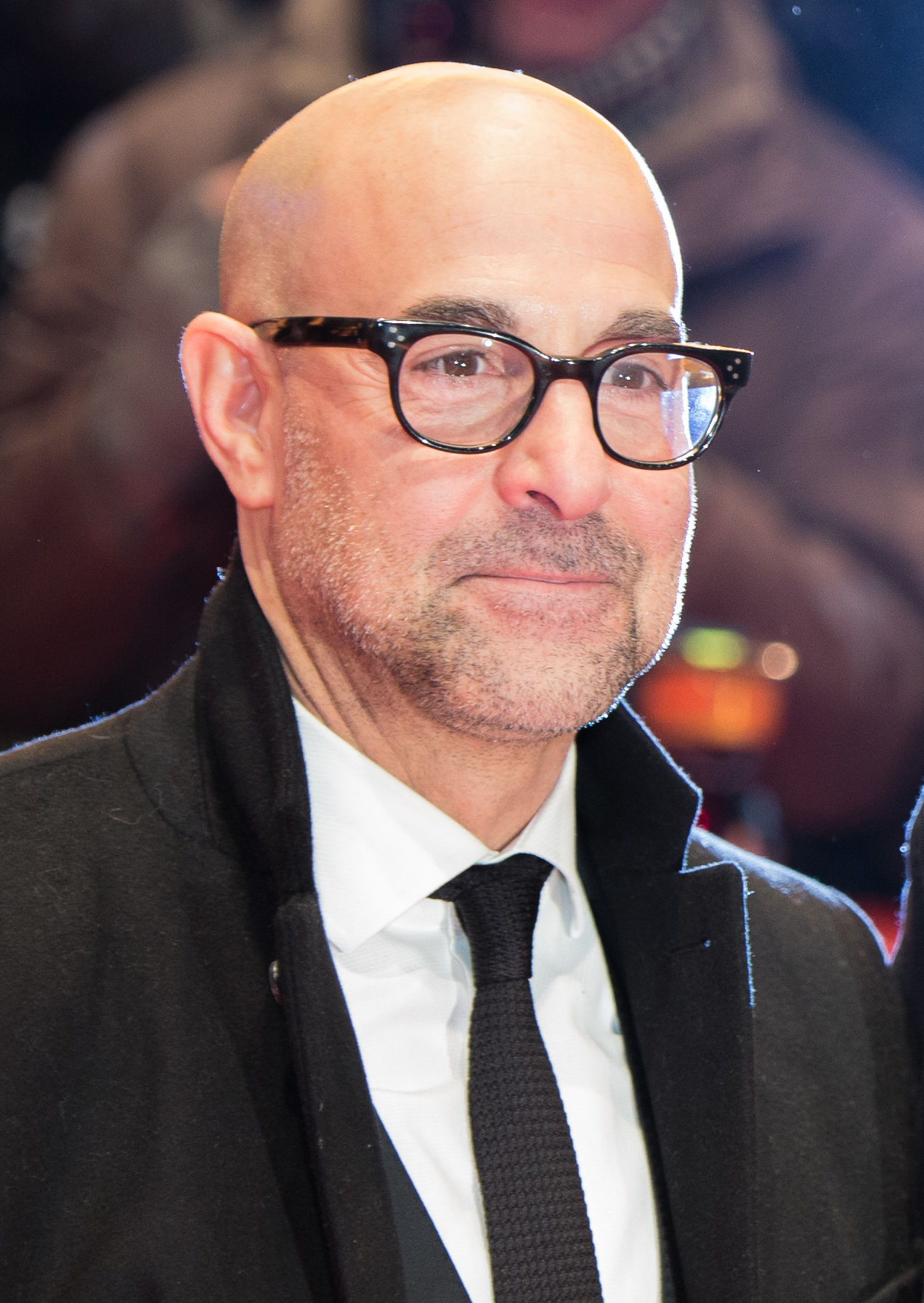
Stanley Tucci won for Winchell (1999).

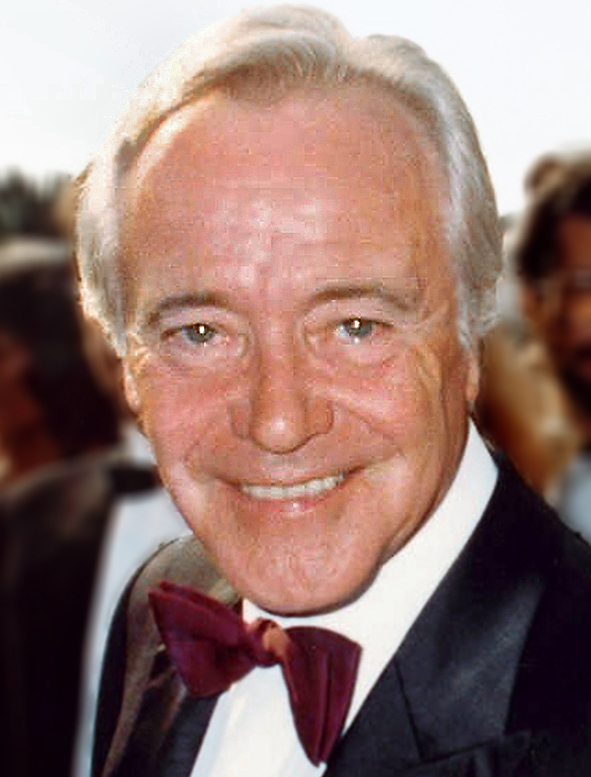
Jack Lemmon won for Tuesdays with Morrie (2000).

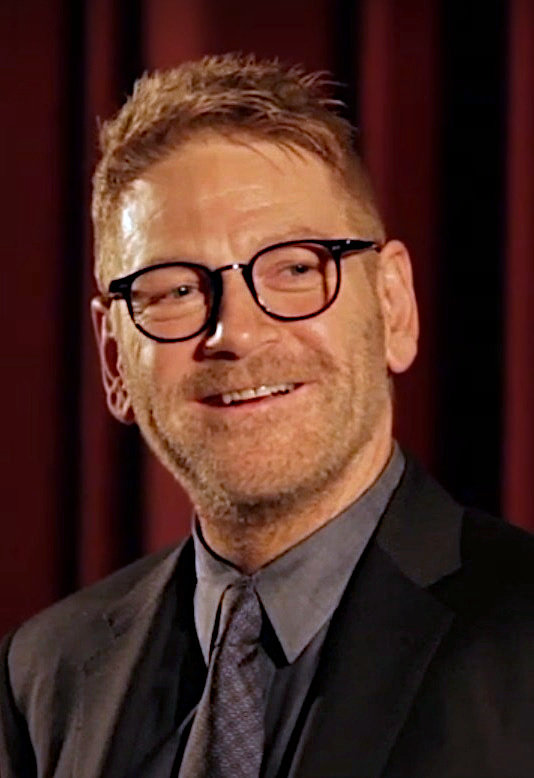
Kenneth Branagh won for Conspiracy (2001).

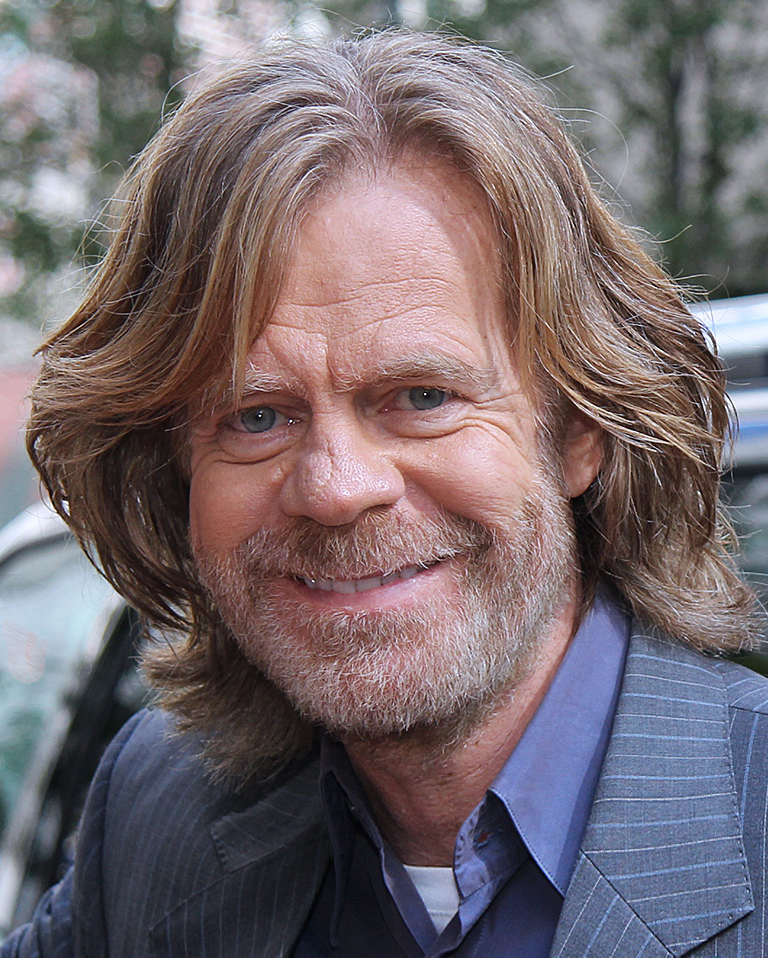
William H. Macy won for Door to Door (2003).

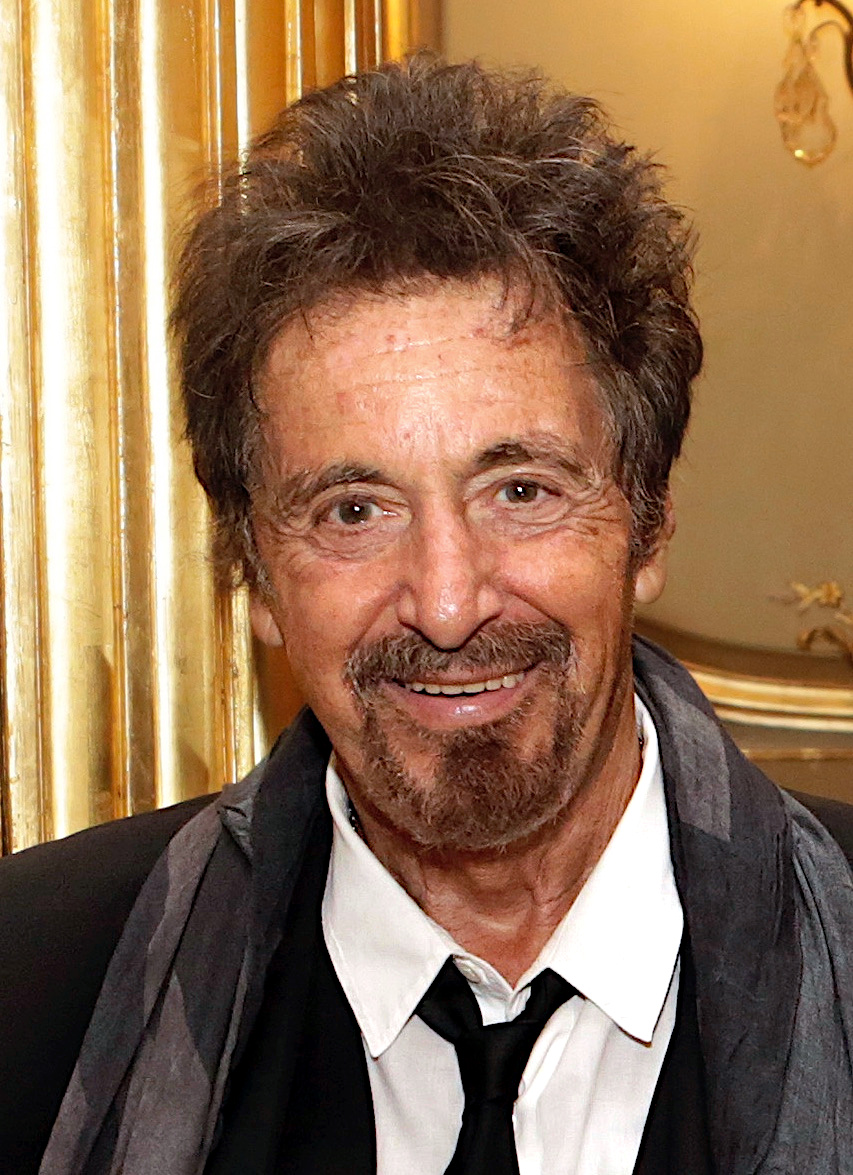
Al Pacino won twice for Angels in America (2004) and You Don't Know Jack (2010).

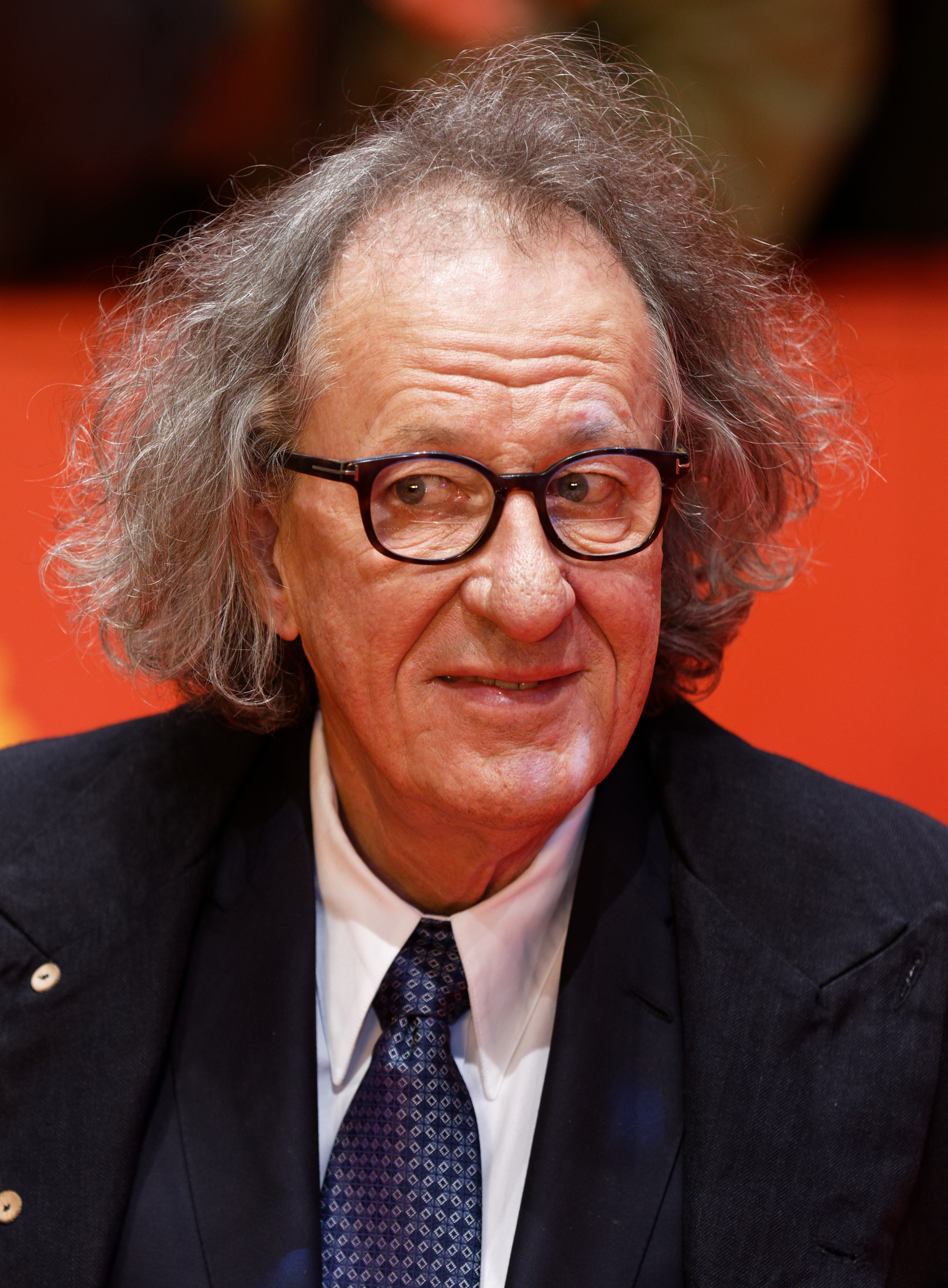
Geoffrey Rush won for The Life and Death of Peter Sellers (2005).

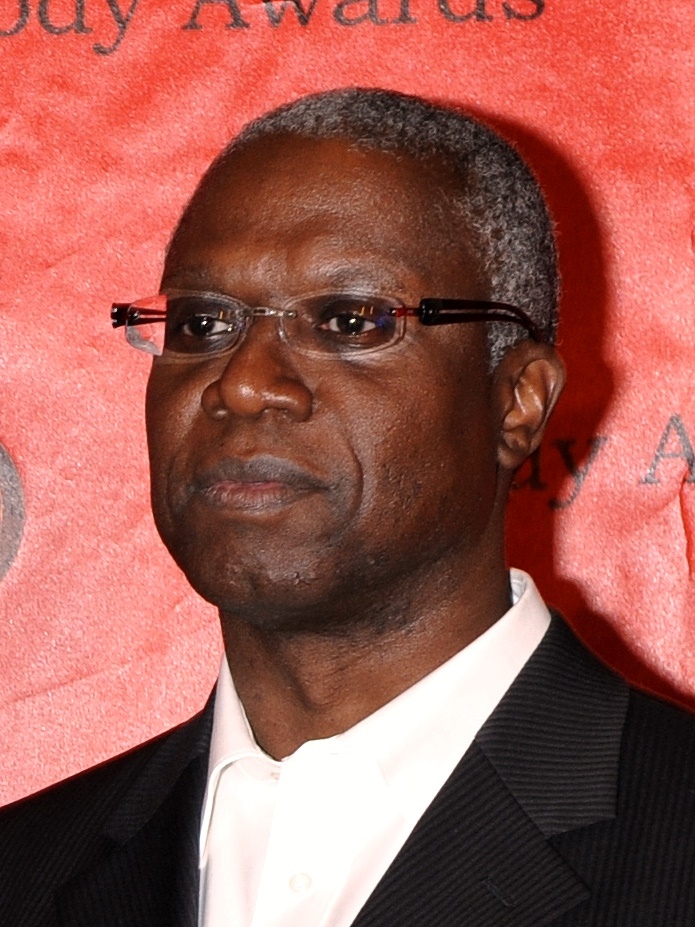
Andre Braugher won for Thief (2006)

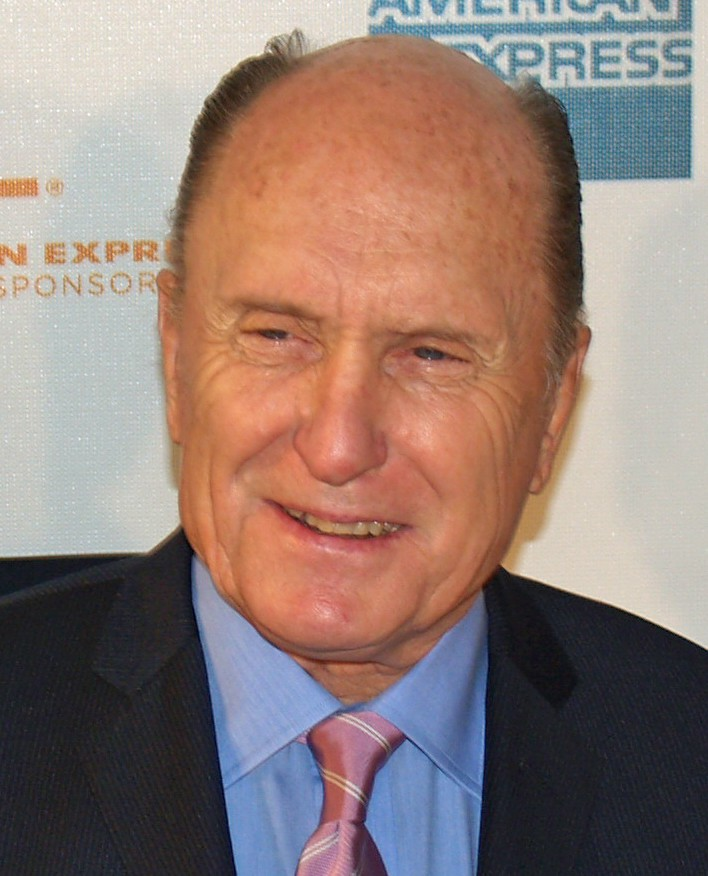
Robert Duvall won for Broken Trail (2007).

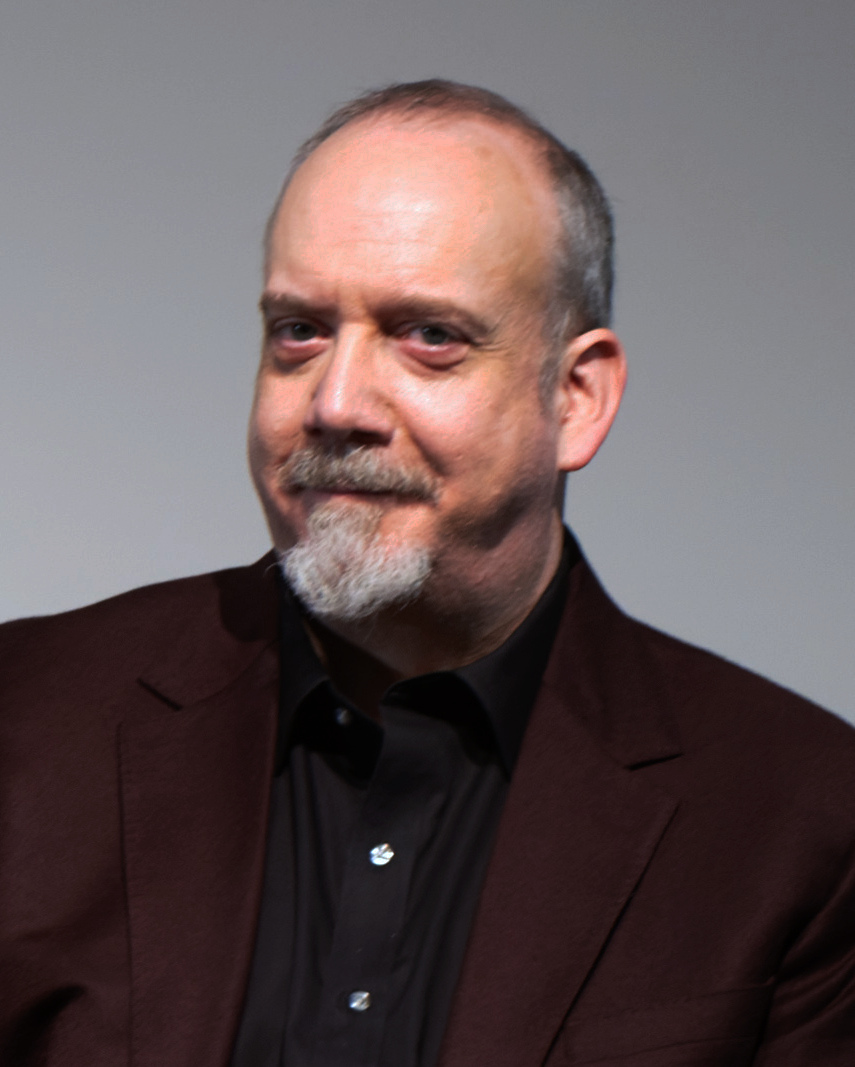
Paul Giamatti won for John Adams (2008).

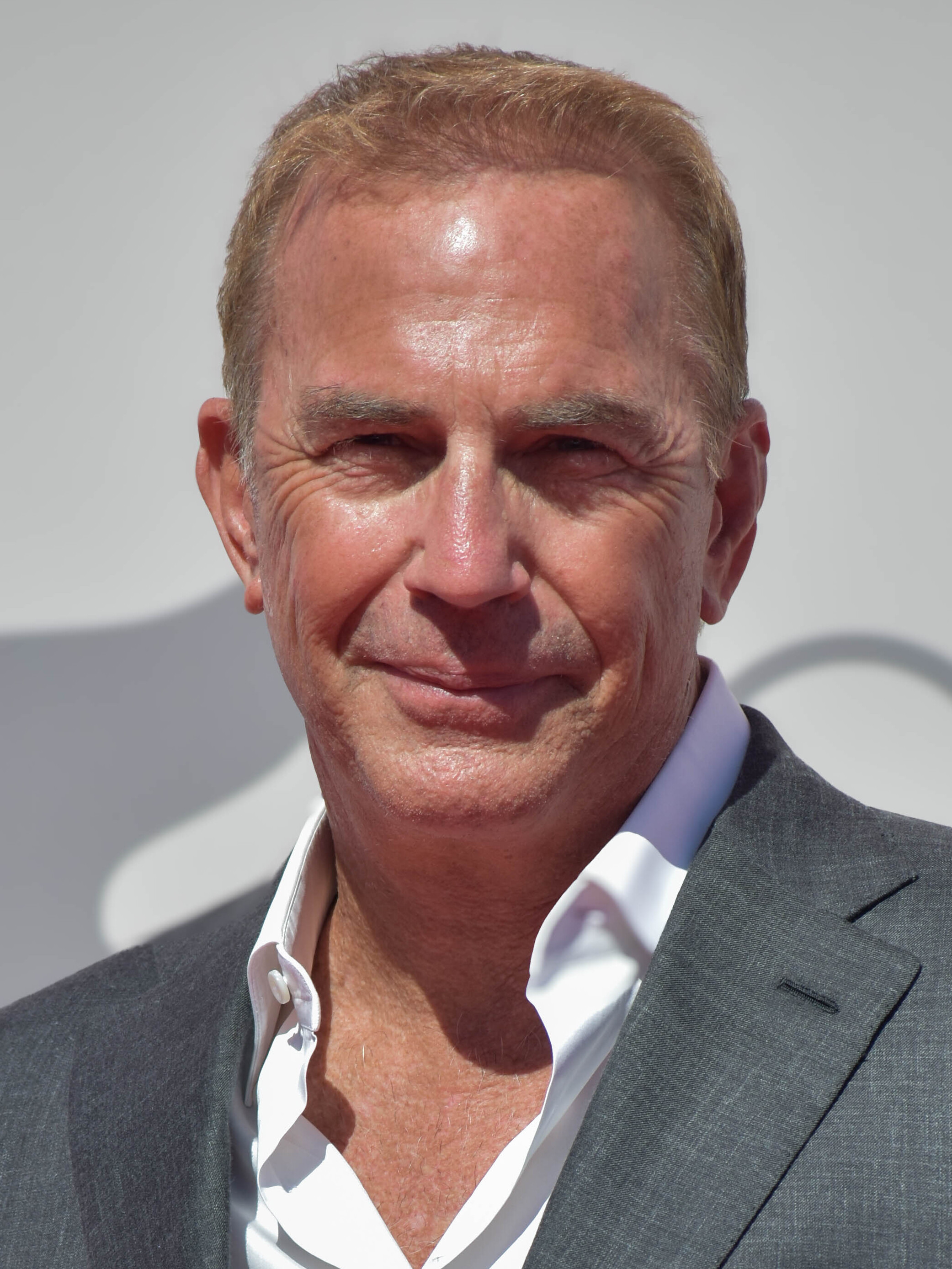
Kevin Costner won for Hatfields & McCoys (2012).

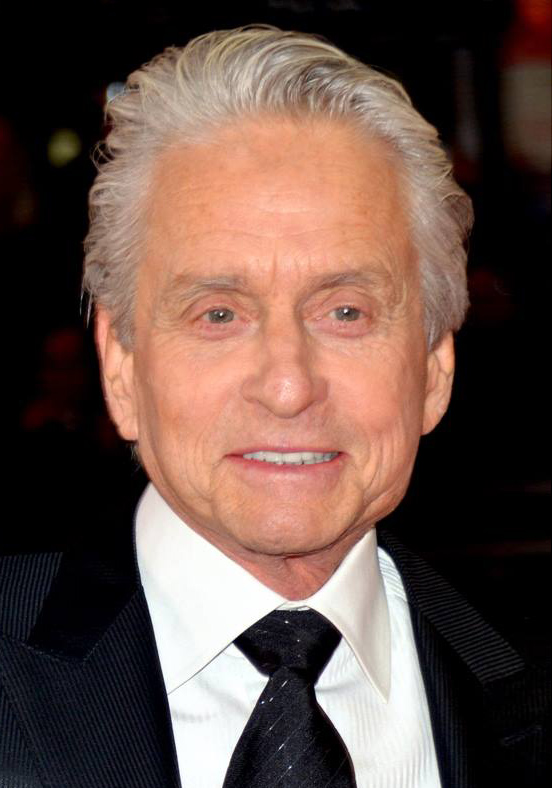
Michael Douglas won for Behind the Candelabra (2013).

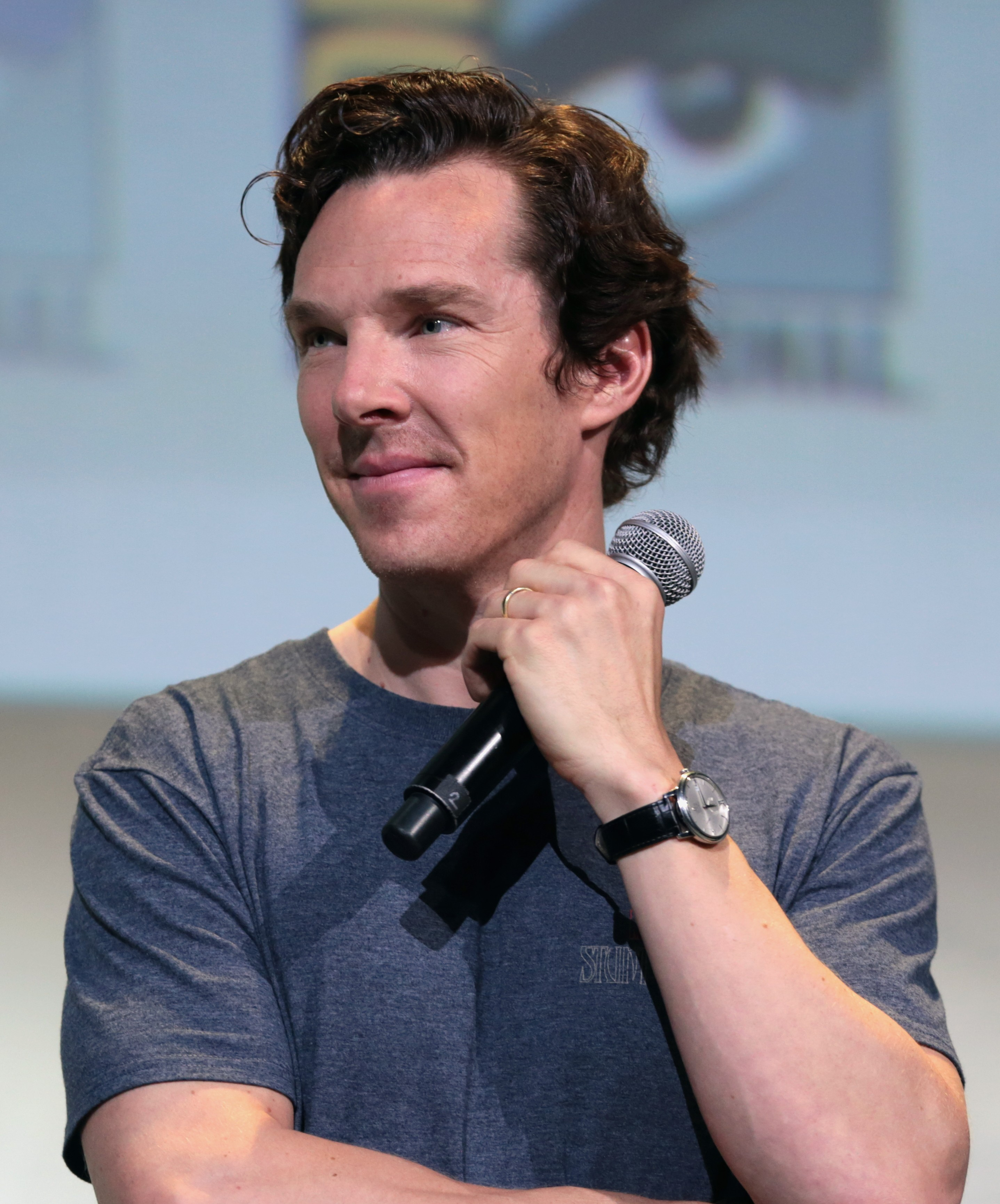
Benedict Cumberbatch won for Sherlock: His Last Vow (2014).

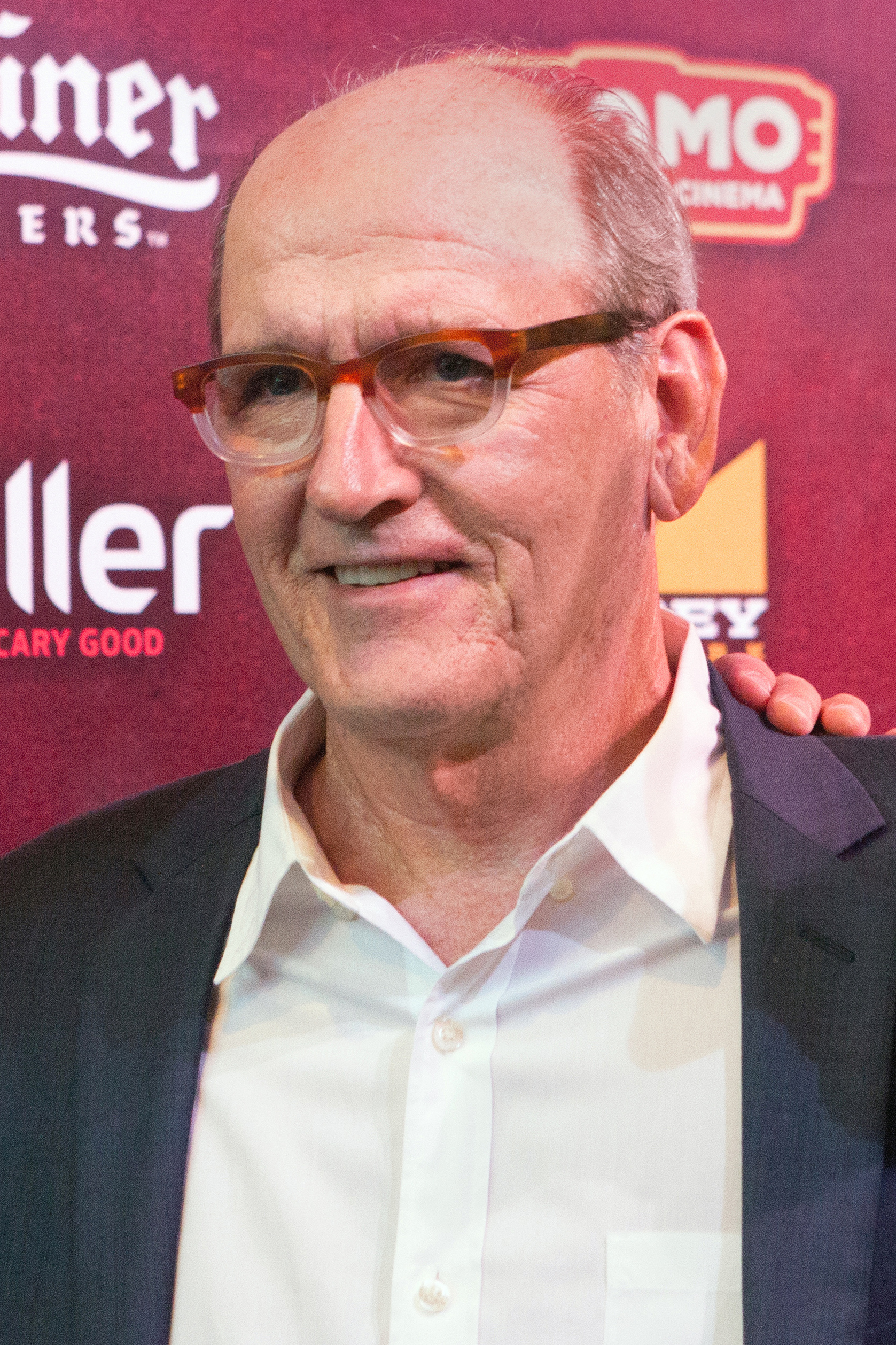
Richard Jenkins won for Olive Kitteridge (2015).

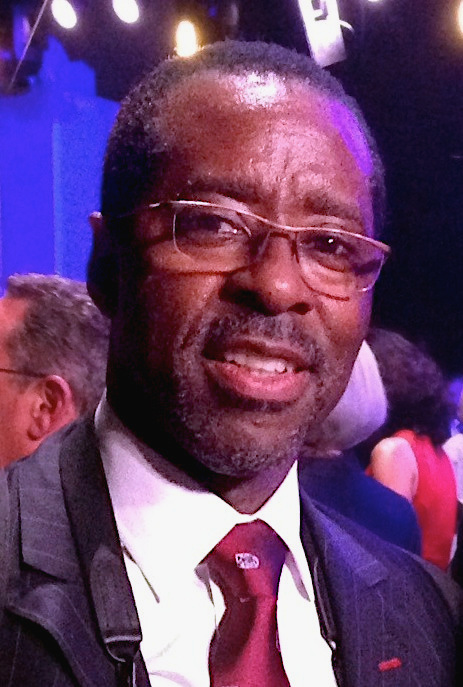
Courtney B. Vance won for The People v. O. J. Simpson: American Crime Story (2016).

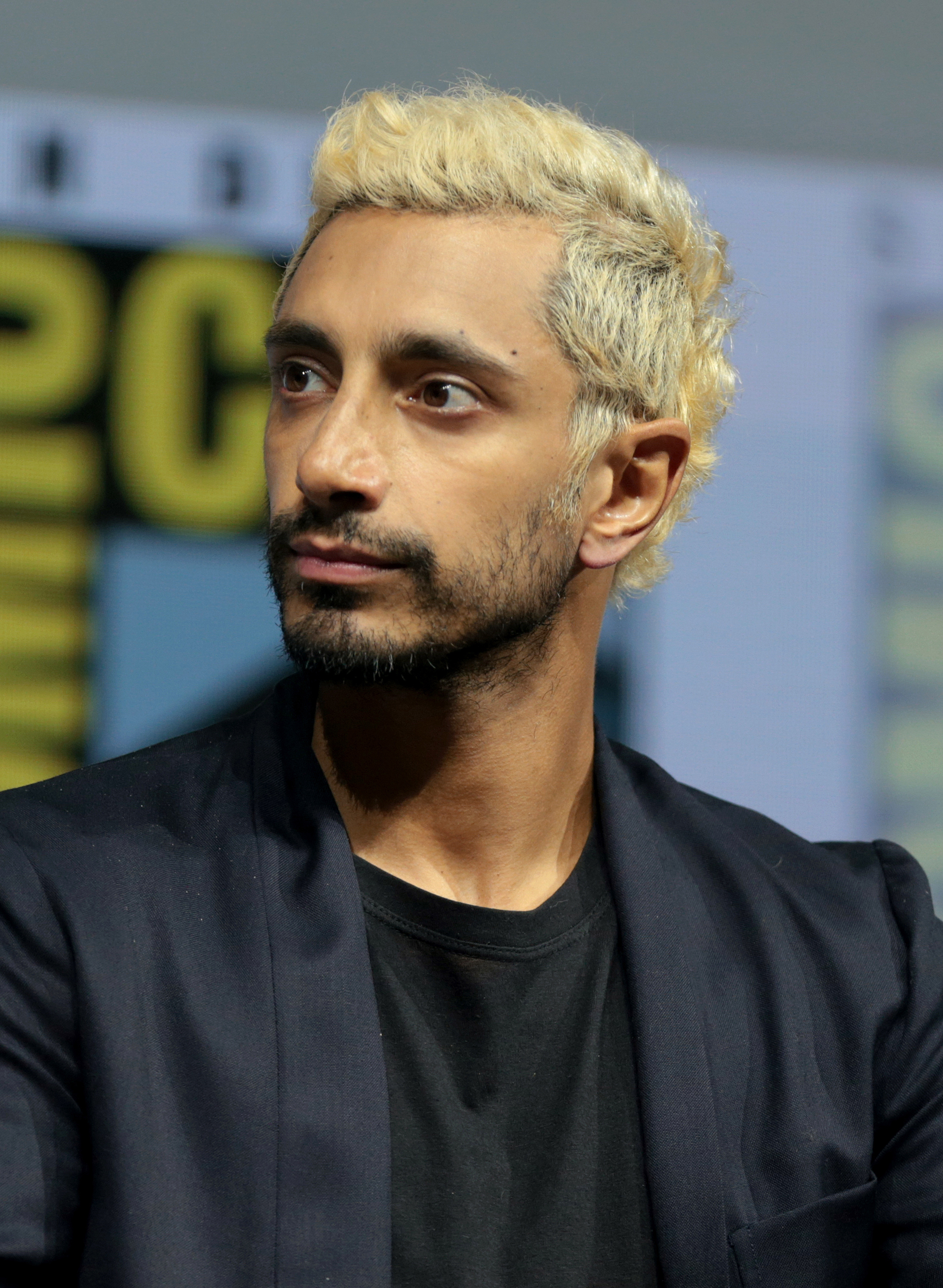
Riz Ahmed won for The Night Of (2017).

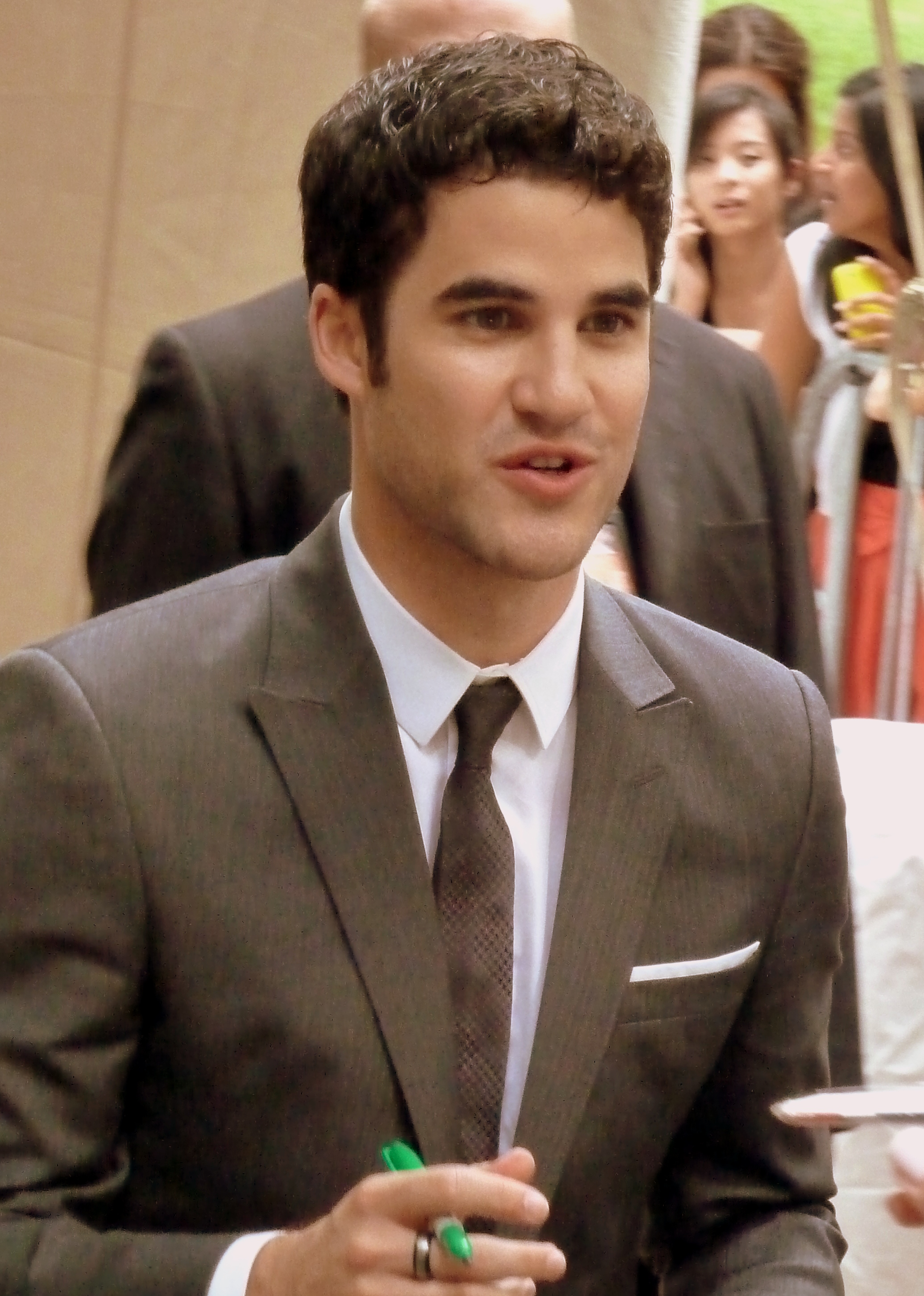
Darren Criss won for The Assassination of Gianni Versace: American Crime Story (2018).

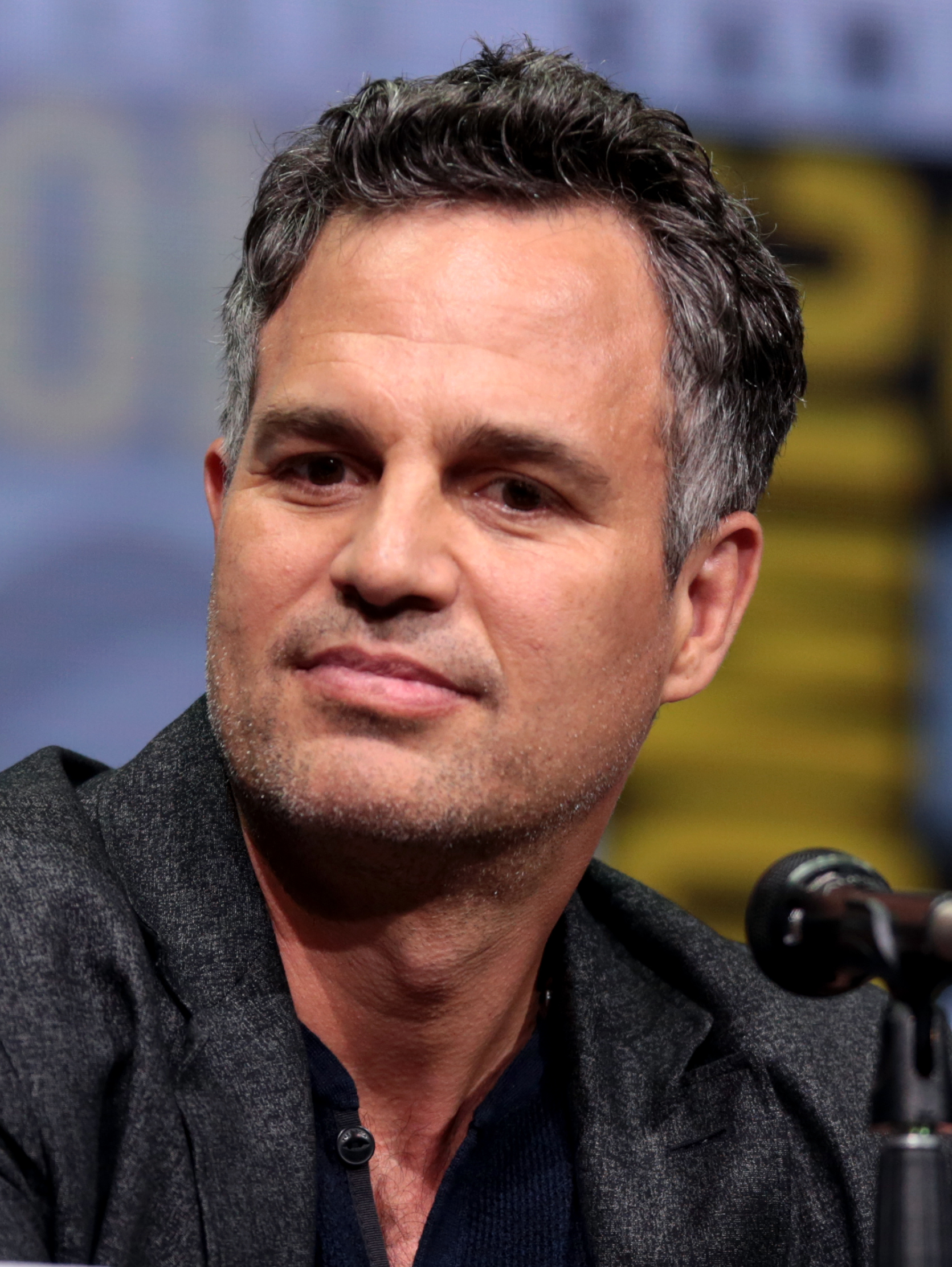
Mark Ruffalo won for I Know This Much Is True (2020).

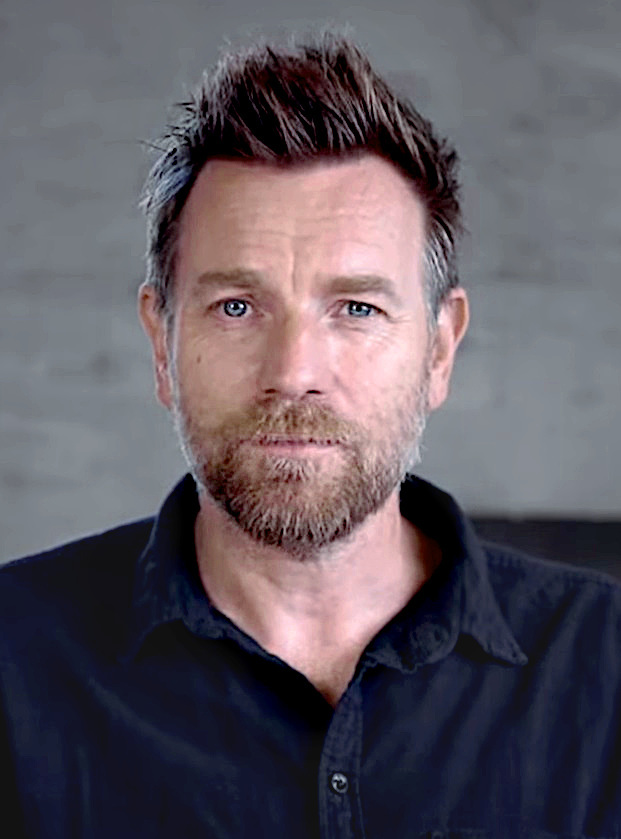
Ewan McGregor won for Halston (2021).

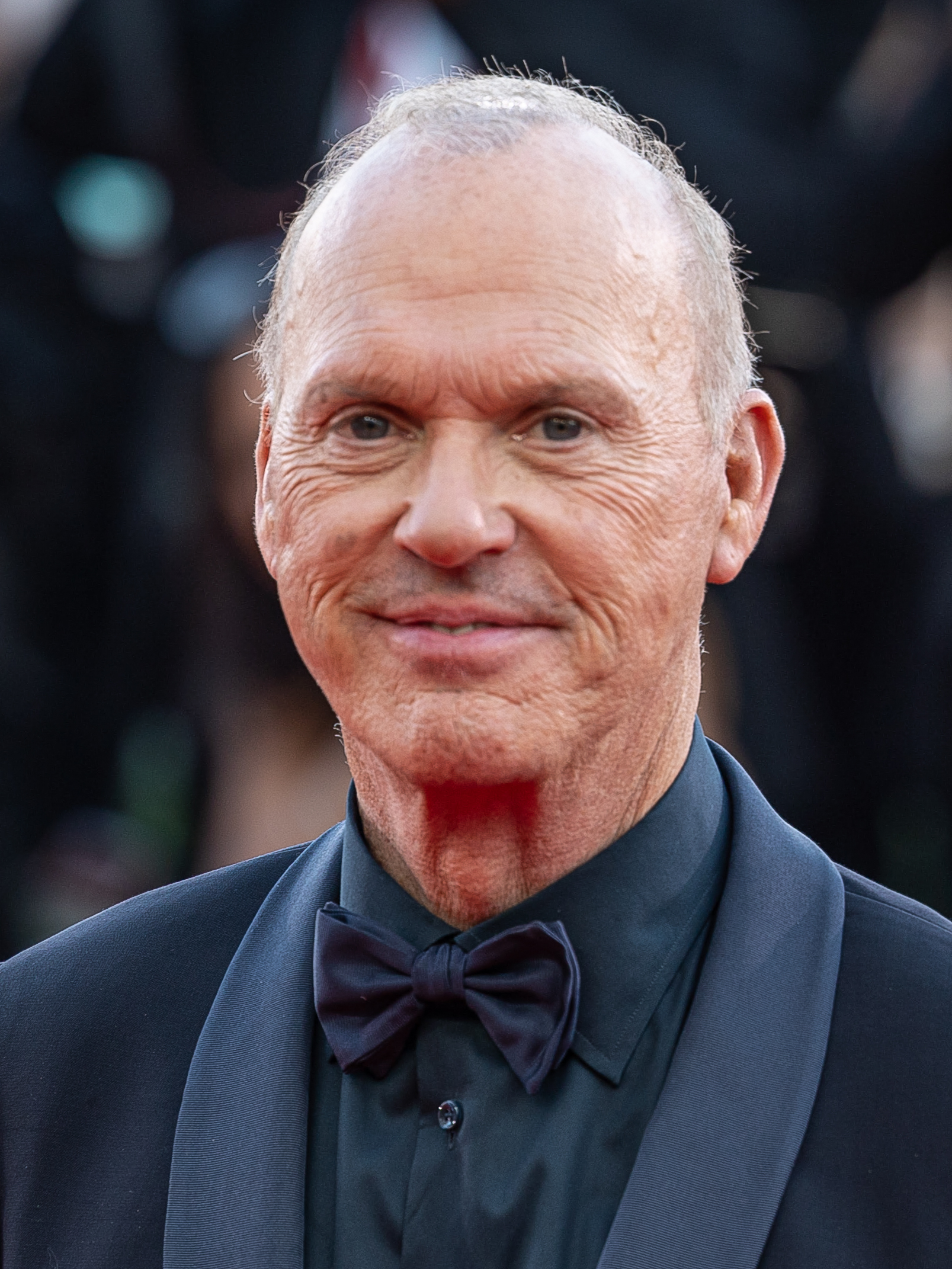
Michael Keaton won for Dopesick (2022).

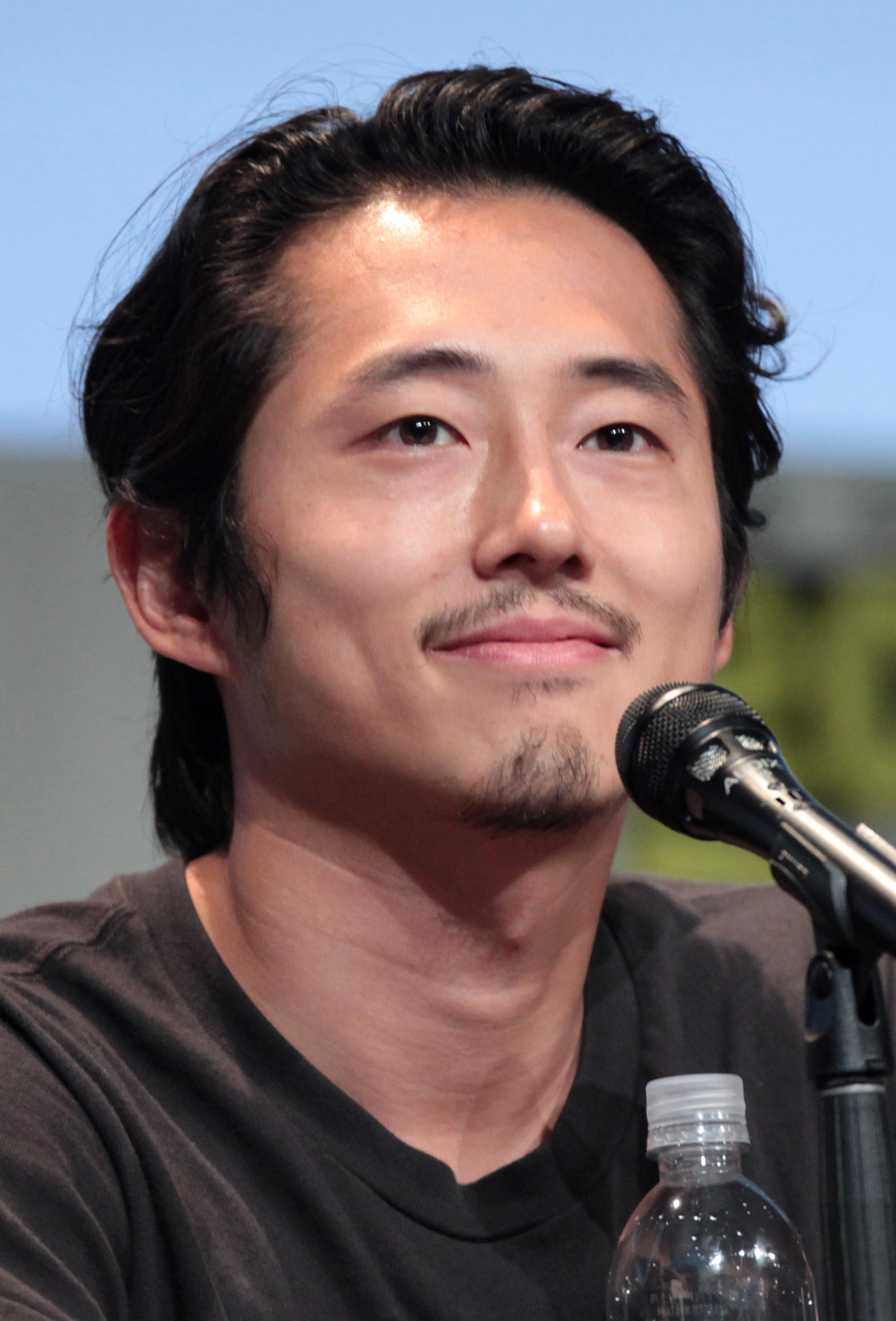
Steven Yeun won for Beef (2023).

Table key
Indicates the winner

=== 1950s ===
Year	Actor	Role	Program	Episode	Network
Best Actor in a Single Performance
1955 (7th)
1955 (7th)	Robert Cummings	Juror #8	Studio One	"Twelve Angry Men"	CBS
1955 (7th)	Frank Lovejoy	Walter Neff	Lux Video Theatre	"Double Indemnity"	CBS
1955 (7th)	Fredric March	Tony Cavendish	The Best of Broadway	"The Royal Family"	CBS
1955 (7th)	Fredric March	Ebenezer Scrooge	Shower of Stars	"A Christmas Carol"	CBS
1955 (7th)	Thomas Mitchell	Father Devlin	Ford Theatre	"The Good of His Soul"	NBC
1955 (7th)	David Niven	Deacon	Four Star Playhouse	"The Answer"	CBS
1956 (8th)
1956 (8th)	Lloyd Nolan	Capt. Queeg	Ford Star Jubilee	"The Caine Mutiny Court-Martial"	CBS
1956 (8th)	Ralph Bellamy	Father	The United States Steel Hour	"The Fearful Decision"	CBS
1956 (8th)	José Ferrer	Cyrano de Bergerac	Producers' Showcase	"Cyrano de Bergerac"	NBC
1956 (8th)	Everett Sloane	President	Kraft Television Theatre	"Patterns"	NBC
1956 (8th)	Barry Sullivan	Defense Attorney Greenwald	Ford Star Jubilee	"The Caine Mutiny Court-Martial"	CBS
1957 (9th)
1957 (9th)	Jack Palance	Harlan "Mountain" McClintock	Playhouse 90	"Requiem for a Heavyweight"	CBS
1957 (9th)	Lloyd Bridges	Alec Beggs	The Alcoa Hour	"Tragedy in a Temporary Town"	NBC
1957 (9th)	Fredric March	Sam Dodsworth	Producers' Showcase	"Dodsworth"	NBC
1957 (9th)	Sal Mineo	Dino Minetta	Studio One	"Dino"	CBS
1957 (9th)	Red Skelton	Buddy McCoy	Playhouse 90	"The Big Slide"	CBS
Best Single Performance by an Actor - Lead or Support
1958 (10th)
1958 (10th)	Peter Ustinov	Dr. Samuel Johnson	Omnibus	"The Life of Samuel Johnson"	NBC
1958 (10th)	Lee J. Cobb	Dr. Joseph Pearson	Studio One	"No Deadly Medicine"	CBS
1958 (10th)	Mickey Rooney	Sammy Hogarth	Playhouse 90	"The Comedian"	CBS
1958 (10th)	David Wayne	James Mennick	Suspicion	"Heartbeat"	NBC
1958 (10th)	Ed Wynn	Gramps Northrup	On Borrowed Time		NBC
Best Single Performance by an Actor
1959 (11th)
1959 (11th)	Fred Astaire	Himself	An Evening with Fred Astaire		NBC
1959 (11th)	Robert L. Crawford Jr.	Tanguy	Playhouse 90	"Child of Our Time"	CBS
1959 (11th)	Paul Muni	Sam Arlen	Playhouse 90	"Last Clear Chance"	CBS
1959 (11th)	Christopher Plummer	Kenneth Boyd	Hallmark Hall of Fame	"Little Moon of Alban"	NBC
1959 (11th)	Mickey Rooney	Eddie	Alcoa Theatre	"Eddie"	NBC
1959 (11th)	Rod Steiger	Harvey Denton	Playhouse 90	"A Town Has Turned to Dust"	CBS

=== 1960s ===
Year	Actor	Role	Program	Episode	Network
Outstanding Single Performance by an Actor (Lead or Support)
1960 (12th)
1960 (12th)	Laurence Olivier	Charles Strickland	The Moon and Sixpence		NBC
1960 (12th)	Lee J. Cobb	Dr. Lawrence Doner	Playhouse 90	"Project Immortality"	CBS
1960 (12th)	Alec Guinness	Jebal Deeks	Startime	"The Wicked Scheme of Jebal Deeks"	NBC
Outstanding Single Performance by an Actor in a Leading Role
1961 (13th)
1961 (13th)	Maurice Evans	Macbeth	Hallmark Hall of Fame	"Macbeth"	NBC
1961 (13th)	Cliff Robertson	Charlie Gordon	The United States Steel Hour	"The Two Worlds of Charlie Gordon"	CBS
1961 (13th)	Ed Wynn	Himself	Westinghouse Desilu Playhouse	"The Man in the Funny Suit"	CBS
1962 (14th)
1962 (14th)	Peter Falk	Aristede Fresco	The Dick Powell Theatre	"The Price of Tomatoes"	NBC
1962 (14th)	Milton Berle	Eddie Doyle	The Dick Powell Theatre	"Doyle Against the House"	NBC
1962 (14th)	James Donald	Albert, Prince Consort	Hallmark Hall of Fame	"Victoria Regina"	NBC
1962 (14th)	Lee Marvin	Hughes	Alcoa Premiere	"People Need People"	ABC
1962 (14th)	Mickey Rooney	Augie Miller	The Dick Powell Theatre	"Somebody's Waiting"	NBC
1963 (15th)
1963 (15th)	Trevor Howard	Benjamin Disraeli	Hallmark Hall of Fame	"Invincible Mr. Disraeli"	NBC
1963 (15th)	Bradford Dillman	Charlie Pont	Premiere, Presented by Fred Astaire	"The Voice of Charlie Pont"	ABC
1963 (15th)	Don Gordon	Joey Tassili	The Defenders	"The Madman"	CBS
1963 (15th)	Walter Matthau	Meredith	The DuPont Show of the Week	"Big Deal in Laredo"	NBC
1963 (15th)	Joseph Schildkraut	Rabbi Gottlieb	Sam Benedict	"Hear the Mellow Wedding Bells"	NBC
1964 (16th)
1964 (16th)	Jack Klugman	Joe Larch	The Defenders	"Blacklist"	CBS
1964 (16th)	James Earl Jones	Joe	East Side/West Side	"Who Do You Kill?"	CBS
1964 (16th)	Roddy McDowall	Paul LeDoux	Arrest and Trial	"Journey Into Darkness"	ABC
1964 (16th)	Jason Robards	Abraham Lincoln	Hallmark Hall of Fame	"Abe Lincoln in Illinois"	NBC
1964 (16th)	Rod Steiger	Mike Kirsch	Bob Hope Presents the Chrysler Theatre	"A Slow Fade to Black"	NBC
1964 (16th)	Harold J. Stone	Elihu Kaminsky	The Doctors and the Nurses	"Nurse Is a Feminine Noun"	CBS
Outstanding Individual Achievements in Entertainment - Actors and Performers
1965 (17th)
1965 (17th)	Alfred Lunt	Oliver Wendell Holmes, Jr.	Hallmark Hall of Fame	"The Magnificent Yankee"	NBC
Outstanding Single Performance by an Actor in a Leading Role in a Drama
1966 (18th)
1966 (18th)	Cliff Robertson	Quincey Parke	Bob Hope Presents the Chrysler Theatre	"The Game"	NBC
1966 (18th)	Ed Begley	Matthew Harrison Brady	Hallmark Hall of Fame	"Inherit the Wind"	NBC
1966 (18th)	Melvyn Douglas	Henry Drummond	Hallmark Hall of Fame	"Inherit the Wind"	NBC
1966 (18th)	Trevor Howard	Napoleon	Hallmark Hall of Fame	"Eagle in a Cage"	NBC
1966 (18th)	Christopher Plummer	Hamlet	Hamlet		Syndicated
1967 (19th)
1967 (19th)	Peter Ustinov	Socrates	Hallmark Hall of Fame	"Barefoot in Athens"	NBC
1967 (19th)	Alan Arkin	Barney Kempinski	ABC Stage 67	"The Love Song of Barney Kempinski"	ABC
1967 (19th)	Lee J. Cobb	Willy Loman	Death of a Salesman		CBS
1967 (19th)	Ivan Dixon	Olly Winter	CBS Playhouse	"The Final War of Olly Winter"	CBS
1967 (19th)	Hal Holbrook	Mark Twain	Hal Holbrook: Mark Twain Tonight!		CBS
1968 (20th)
1968 (20th)	Melvyn Douglas	Peter Schermann	CBS Playhouse	"Do Not Go Gentle Into That Good Night"	CBS
1968 (20th)	Raymond Burr	Robert T. Ironside	Ironside	"Pilot"	NBC
1968 (20th)	Van Heflin	Robert Sloane	A Case of Libel		ABC
1968 (20th)	George C. Scott	John Proctor	The Crucible		CBS
1968 (20th)	Eli Wallach	Douglas Lambert	CBS Playhouse	"Dear Friends"	CBS
Outstanding Single Performance by an Actor in a Leading Role
1969 (21st)
1969 (21st)	Paul Scofield	Emlyn Bowen	Prudiential's On Stage	"Male of the Species"	NBC
1969 (21st)	Ossie Davis	Charles Carter	Hallmark Hall of Fame	"Teacher, Teacher"	NBC
1969 (21st)	David McCallum	Hamilton Cade	Hallmark Hall of Fame	"Teacher, Teacher"	NBC
1969 (21st)	Bill Travers	Crichton	Hallmark Hall of Fame	"The Admirable Crichton"	NBC

=== 1970s ===
Year	Actor	Role	Program	Network
Outstanding Single Performance by an Actor in a Leading Role
1970 (22nd)
1970 (22nd)	Peter Ustinov	Abel Shaddick	A Storm in Summer	NBC
1970 (22nd)	Al Freeman Jr.	Charles Roberts	My Sweet Charlie	NBC
1970 (22nd)	Laurence Olivier	Mr. Creakle	David Copperfield	NBC
1971 (23rd)
1971 (23rd)	George C. Scott	Victor Franz	The Price	NBC
1971 (23rd)	Jack Cassidy	Otis Baker	The Andersonville Trial	PBS
1971 (23rd)	Hal Holbrook	Hays Stowe	A Clear and Present Danger	NBC
1971 (23rd)	Richard Widmark	Paul Roudebush	Vanished	NBC
1971 (23rd)	Gig Young	Jones	The Neon Ceiling	NBC
1972 (24th)
1972 (24th)	Keith Michell	Henry VIII	The Six Wives of Henry VIII	CBS
1972 (24th)	James Caan	Brian Piccolo	Brian's Song	ABC
1972 (24th)	Richard Harris	Philip Rhayadar	The Snow Goose	NBC
1972 (24th)	George C. Scott	Edward Rochester	Jane Eyre	NBC
1972 (24th)	Billy Dee Williams	Gale Sayers	Brian's Song	ABC
1973 (25th)
1973 (25th)	Laurence Olivier	James Tyrone, Sr.	Long Day's Journey Into Night	ABC
1973 (25th)	Henry Fonda	Carl Tiflin	The Red Pony	NBC
1973 (25th)	Hal Holbrook	Doug Salter	That Certain Summer	ABC
1973 (25th)	Telly Savalas	Theo Kojak	Kojak: The Marcus-Nelson Murders	CBS
1973 (25th)	Outstanding Continued Performance by an Actor in a Leading Role (Drama/Comedy - Limited Episodes)			
1973 (25th)	Anthony Murphy	Tom Brown	Tom Brown's Schooldays	PBS
1973 (25th)	John Abineri	Chingachgook	The Last of the Mohicans	PBS
1973 (25th)	Philippe Leroy	Leonardo da Vinci	The Life of Leonardo da Vinci	CBS
1974 (26th)	Best Lead Actor in a Drama			
1974 (26th)	Hal Holbrook	Lloyd Bucher	Pueblo	ABC
1974 (26th)	Alan Alda	Paul Friedman	6 Rms Riv Vu	CBS
1974 (26th)	Laurence Olivier	Shylock	The Merchant of Venice	ABC
1974 (26th)	Martin Sheen	Eddie Slovik	The Execution of Private Slovik	NBC
1974 (26th)	Dick Van Dyke	Charlie Lester	The Morning After	ABC
1974 (26th)	Best Lead Actor in a Limited Series			
1974 (26th)	William Holden	Bumper Morgan	The Blue Knight	NBC
1974 (26th)	Peter Falk	Columbo	Columbo	NBC
1974 (26th)	Dennis Weaver	Sam McCloud	McCloud	NBC
1975 (27th)	Outstanding Lead Actor in a Special Program – Drama or Comedy			
1975 (27th)	Laurence Olivier	Arthur Glanville-Jones	Love Among the Ruins	ABC
1975 (27th)	Richard Chamberlain	Edmond Dantès	The Count of Monte Cristo	NBC
1975 (27th)	William Devane	John F. Kennedy	The Missiles of October	ABC
1975 (27th)	Charles Durning	Al Green	Queen of the Stardust Ballroom	CBS
1975 (27th)	Henry Fonda	Clarence Darrow	Clarence Darrow	NBC
1975 (27th)	Outstanding Lead Actor in a Limited Series			
1975 (27th)	Peter Falk	Columbo	Columbo	NBC
1975 (27th)	Dennis Weaver	Sam McCloud	McCloud	NBC
1976 (28th)	Outstanding Lead Actor in a Special Program – Drama or Comedy			
1976 (28th)	Anthony Hopkins	Richard Hauptmann	The Lindbergh Kidnapping Case	NBC
1976 (28th)	William Devane	John Henry Faulk	Fear on Trial	CBS
1976 (28th)	Edward Herrmann	Franklin D. Roosevelt	Eleanor and Franklin	ABC
1976 (28th)	Jack Lemmon	Archie Rice	The Entertainer	NBC
1976 (28th)	Jason Robards	James Tyrone, Jr.	A Moon for the Misbegotten	ABC
1976 (28th)	Outstanding Lead Actor in a Limited Series			
1976 (28th)	Hal Holbrook	Abraham Lincoln	Sandburg's Lincoln	NBC
1976 (28th)	George Grizzard	John Adams	The Adams Chronicles	PBS
1976 (28th)	Nick Nolte	Thomas Jordache	Rich Man, Poor Man	ABC
1976 (28th)	Peter Strauss	Rudolph Jordache	Rich Man, Poor Man	ABC
1977 (29th)	Outstanding Lead Actor in a Special Program – Drama or Comedy			
1977 (29th)	Ed Flanders	Harry S. Truman	Harry S. Truman: Plain Speaking	PBS
1977 (29th)	Peter Boyle	Joseph McCarthy	Tail Gunner Joe	NBC
1977 (29th)	Peter Finch (post-humously)	Yitzhak Rabin	Raid on Entebbe	NBC
1977 (29th)	Edward Herrmann	Franklin D. Roosevelt	Eleanor and Franklin: The White House Years	ABC
1977 (29th)	George C. Scott	The Beast	Beauty and the Beast	NBC
1977 (29th)	Outstanding Lead Actor in a Limited Series			
1977 (29th)	Christopher Plummer	Roscoe Heyward	The Moneychangers	NBC
1977 (29th)	Stanley Baker	Gwilym Morgan	How Green Was My Valley	PBS
1977 (29th)	Richard Jordan	Joseph Armagh	Captains and the Kings	NBC
1977 (29th)	Steven Keats	Jay Blackman	Seventh Avenue	NBC
1978 (30th)	Outstanding Lead Actor in a Drama or Comedy Special			
1978 (30th)	Fred Astaire	Ted Long	A Family Upside Down	NBC
1978 (30th)	Alan Alda	Caryl Chessman	Kill Me If You Can	NBC
1978 (30th)	Hal Holbrook	Stage Manager	Our Town	NBC
1978 (30th)	Martin Sheen	Taxi Driver	Taxi!!!	NBC
1978 (30th)	James Stacy	Kenny Briggs	Just a Little Inconvenience	NBC
1978 (30th)	Outstanding Lead Actor in a Limited Series			
1978 (30th)	Michael Moriarty	Erik Dorf	Holocaust	NBC
1978 (30th)	Hal Holbrook	Portius Wheeler	The Awakening Land	NBC
1978 (30th)	Jason Robards	Richard Monckton	Washington: Behind Closed Doors	ABC
1978 (30th)	Fritz Weaver	Josef Weiss	Holocaust	NBC
1978 (30th)	Paul Winfield	Martin Luther King, Jr.	King	NBC
Outstanding Lead Actor in a Limited Series or Special
1979 (31st)
1979 (31st)	Peter Strauss	Larry Murphy	The Jericho Mile	ABC
1979 (31st)	Ned Beatty	Gene Mullen	Friendly Fire	ABC
1979 (31st)	Louis Gossett Jr.	Levi Mercer	Backstairs at the White House	NBC
1979 (31st)	Kurt Russell	Elvis Presley	Elvis	ABC

=== 1980s ===
Year	Actor	Role	Program	Network
Outstanding Lead Actor in a Limited Series or Special
1980 (32nd)
1980 (32nd)	Powers Boothe	Jim Jones	Guyana Tragedy: The Story of Jim Jones	CBS
1980 (32nd)	Tony Curtis	David O. Selznick	The Scarlett O'Hara War	NBC
1980 (32nd)	Henry Fonda	Clarence Earl Gideon	Gideon's Trumpet	CBS
1980 (32nd)	Jason Robards	Franklin D. Roosevelt	F.D.R.: The Last Year	NBC
1981 (33rd)
1981 (33rd)	Anthony Hopkins	Adolf Hitler	The Bunker	CBS
1981 (33rd)	Richard Chamberlain	John Blackthorne / "Anjin-san"	Shōgun	NBC
1981 (33rd)	Toshiro Mifune	Lord Yoshi Toranaga	Shōgun	NBC
1981 (33rd)	Peter O'Toole	Cornelius Flavius Silva	Masada	ABC
1981 (33rd)	Peter Strauss	Eleazar Ben Yair	Masada	ABC
1982 (34th)
1982 (34th)	Mickey Rooney	Bill Sackter	Bill	CBS
1982 (34th)	Anthony Andrews	Sebastian Flyte	Brideshead Revisited	PBS
1982 (34th)	Philip Anglim	John Merrick	The Elephant Man	ABC
1982 (34th)	Anthony Hopkins	Quasimodo	The Hunchback of Notre Dame	CBS
1982 (34th)	Jeremy Irons	Charles Ryder	Brideshead Revisited	PBS
1983 (35th)
1983 (35th)	Tommy Lee Jones	Gary Gilmore	The Executioner's Song	NBC
1983 (35th)	Robert Blake	Jimmy Hoffa	Blood Feud	OPT
1983 (35th)	Richard Chamberlain	Ralph de Bricassart	The Thorn Birds	ABC
1983 (35th)	Alec Guinness	George Smiley	Smiley's People	Syndicated
1983 (35th)	Roger Rees	Nicholas Nickleby	The Life and Adventures of Nicholas Nickleby	Syndicated
1984 (36th)
1984 (36th)	Laurence Olivier	King Lear	King Lear	Syndicated
1984 (36th)	Ted Danson	Steven Bennett	Something About Amelia	ABC
1984 (36th)	Louis Gossett Jr.	Anwar al-Sadat	Sadat	OPT
1984 (36th)	Mickey Rooney	Bill Sackter	Bill: On His Own	CBS
1984 (36th)	Daniel J. Travanti	John Walsh	Adam	NBC
1985 (37th)
1985 (37th)	Richard Crenna	Richard Beck	The Rape of Richard Beck	ABC
1985 (37th)	Richard Chamberlain	Raoul Wallenberg	Wallenberg: A Hero's Story	NBC
1985 (37th)	James Garner	Harold Lear	Heartsounds	ABC
1985 (37th)	Richard Kiley	George Hollis	Do You Remember Love	CBS
1985 (37th)	George C. Scott	Ebenezer Scrooge	A Christmas Carol	CBS
Outstanding Lead Actor in a Miniseries or Special
1986 (38th)
1986 (38th)	Dustin Hoffman	Willy Loman	Death of a Salesman	CBS
1986 (38th)	Kirk Douglas	Amos Lasher	Amos	CBS
1986 (38th)	Ben Gazzara	Nick Pierson	An Early Frost	NBC
1986 (38th)	John Lithgow	Maj. Kendall Laird	Resting Place	CBS
1986 (38th)	Aidan Quinn	Michael Pierson	An Early Frost	NBC
1987 (39th)
1987 (39th)	James Woods	D. J.	Promise	CBS
1987 (39th)	Alan Arkin	Leon Feldhendler	Escape from Sobibor	CBS
1987 (39th)	James Garner	Bob Beuhler	Promise	CBS
1987 (39th)	Louis Gossett Jr.	Mathu	A Gathering of Old Men	CBS
1987 (39th)	Randy Quaid	Lyndon B. Johnson	LBJ: The Early Years	NBC
1988 (40th)
1988 (40th)	Jason Robards	Henry Drummond	Inherit the Wind	NBC
1988 (40th)	Hume Cronyn	Hector Nations	Foxfire	CBS
1988 (40th)	Danny Glover	Nelson Mandela	Mandela	HBO
1988 (40th)	Stacy Keach	Ernest Hemingway	Hemingway	Syndicated
1988 (40th)	Jack Lemmon	John M. Slaton	The Murder of Mary Phagan	NBC
1989 (41st)
1989 (41st)	James Woods	Bill Wilson	My Name Is Bill W.	ABC
1989 (41st)	Robert Duvall	Gus McCrae	Lonesome Dove	CBS
1989 (41st)	John Gielgud	Aaron Jastrow	War and Remembrance	ABC
1989 (41st)	Tommy Lee Jones	Woodrow F. Call	Lonesome Dove	CBS
1989 (41st)	Ben Kingsley	Simon Wiesenthal	Murderers Among Us: The Simon Wiesenthal Story	HBO

=== 1990s ===
Year	Actor	Role	Program	Network
Outstanding Lead Actor in a Miniseries or Special
1990 (42nd)
1990 (42nd)	Hume Cronyn	Cooper	Age-Old Friends	HBO
1990 (42nd)	Michael Caine	Dr. Henry Jekyll / Harry Hyde	Jekyll & Hyde	ABC
1990 (42nd)	Art Carney	The Father	Where Pigeons Go to Die	NBC
1990 (42nd)	Albert Finney	Jason Cromwell	The Image	HBO
1990 (42nd)	Tom Hulce	Michael Schwerner	Murder in Mississippi	NBC
1991 (43rd)
1991 (43rd)	John Gielgud	Haverford Downs	Summer's Lease	PBS
1991 (43rd)	James Garner	Albert Sidney Finch	Decoration Day	NBC
1991 (43rd)	Dennis Hopper	Paris Trout	Paris Trout	Showtime
1991 (43rd)	Sidney Poitier	Thurgood Marshall	Separate but Equal	ABC
1991 (43rd)	Christopher Walken	Jacob Witting	Sarah, Plain and Tall	CBS
1992 (44th)
1992 (44th)	Beau Bridges	James Brady	Without Warning: The James Brady Story	HBO
1992 (44th)	Rubén Blades	Ernesto Ontiveros	Crazy from the Heart	TNT
1992 (44th)	Hume Cronyn	Cleveland Merriweather	Christmas on Division Street	CBS
1992 (44th)	Brian Dennehy	John Wayne Gacy	To Catch a Killer	Syndicated
1992 (44th)	Maximilian Schell	Mordechai Weiss	Miss Rose White	NBC
1993 (45th)
1993 (45th)	Robert Morse	Truman Capote	Tru	PBS
1993 (45th)	Robert Blake	John List	Judgment Day: The John List Story	CBS
1993 (45th)	Robert Duvall	Joseph Stalin	Stalin	HBO
1993 (45th)	James Garner	F. Ross Johnson	Barbarians at the Gate	HBO
1993 (45th)	James Woods	Roy Cohn	Citizen Cohn	HBO
1994 (46th)
1994 (46th)	Hume Cronyn	Sam Peek	To Dance with the White Dog	CBS
1994 (46th)	Michael Caine	Joseph Stalin	World War II: When Lions Roared	NBC
1994 (46th)	James Garner	Ira Moran	Breathing Lessons	CBS
1994 (46th)	Matthew Modine	Don Francis	And the Band Played On	HBO
1994 (46th)	Sam Waterston	Forrest Bedford	I'll Fly Away: Then and Now	PBS
1995 (47th)
1995 (47th)	Raul Julia (post-humously)	Chico Mendes	The Burning Season	HBO
1995 (47th)	Charles S. Dutton	Boy Willie Charles	The Piano Lesson	CBS
1995 (47th)	John Goodman	Huey P. Long	Kingfish: A Story of Huey P. Long	TNT
1995 (47th)	John Lithgow	Tom Bradley / Bob Bradley	My Brother's Keeper	CBS
1995 (47th)	James Woods	Danny Davis	Indictment: The McMartin Trial	HBO
1996 (48th)
1996 (48th)	Alan Rickman	Grigori Rasputin	Rasputin: Dark Servant of Destiny	HBO
1996 (48th)	Alec Baldwin	Stanley Kowalski	A Streetcar Named Desire	CBS
1996 (48th)	Beau Bridges	Richard Nixon	Kissinger and Nixon	TNT
1996 (48th)	Laurence Fishburne	Hannibal Lee	The Tuskegee Airmen	HBO
1996 (48th)	Gary Sinise	Harry S. Truman	Truman	HBO
1997 (49th)
1997 (49th)	Armand Assante	John Gotti	Gotti	HBO
1997 (49th)	Beau Bridges	Bill Januson	Hidden in America	Showtime
1997 (49th)	Robert Duvall	Adolf Eichmann	The Man Who Captured Eichmann	TNT
1997 (49th)	Laurence Fishburne	Caleb Humphries	Miss Evers' Boys	HBO
1997 (49th)	Sidney Poitier	Nelson Mandela	Mandela and de Klerk	Showtime
1998 (50th)
1998 (50th)	Gary Sinise	George Wallace	George Wallace	TNT
1998 (50th)	Jack Lemmon	Juror #8	12 Angry Men	Showtime
1998 (50th)	Sam Neill	Merlin	Merlin	NBC
1998 (50th)	Ving Rhames	Don King	Don King: Only in America	HBO
1998 (50th)	Patrick Stewart	Captain Ahab	Moby Dick	USA
1999 (51st)
1999 (51st)	Stanley Tucci	Walter Winchell	Winchell	HBO
1999 (51st)	Don Cheadle	Grant Wiggins	A Lesson Before Dying	HBO
1999 (51st)	Ian Holm	King Lear	King Lear	PBS
1999 (51st)	Jack Lemmon	Henry Drummond	Inherit the Wind	Showtime
1999 (51st)	Sam Shepard	Dashiell Hammett	Dash and Lilly	A&E

=== 2000s ===
Year	Actor	Role	Program	Network
Outstanding Lead Actor in a Miniseries or Movie
2000 (52nd)
2000 (52nd)	Jack Lemmon	Morrie Schwartz	Tuesdays with Morrie	ABC
2000 (52nd)	Beau Bridges	P. T. Barnum	P. T. Barnum	A&E
2000 (52nd)	Brian Dennehy	Willy Loman	Death of a Salesman	Showtime
2000 (52nd)	William H. Macy	Terry Thorpe	A Slight Case of Murder	TNT
2000 (52nd)	Liev Schreiber	Orson Welles	RKO 281	HBO
2001 (53rd)
2001 (53rd)	Kenneth Branagh	Reinhard Heydrich	Conspiracy	HBO
2001 (53rd)	Andy García	Arturo Sandoval	For Love or Country: The Arturo Sandoval Story	HBO
2001 (53rd)	Gregory Hines	Bill "Bojangles" Robinson	Bojangles	Showtime
2001 (53rd)	Ben Kingsley	Otto Frank	Anne Frank: The Whole Story	ABC
2001 (53rd)	Barry Pepper	Roger Maris	61*	HBO
2002 (54th)
2002 (54th)	Albert Finney	Winston Churchill	The Gathering Storm	HBO
2002 (54th)	Kenneth Branagh	Ernest Shackleton	Shackleton	A&E
2002 (54th)	Beau Bridges	Michael Mulvaney	We Were the Mulvaneys	Lifetime
2002 (54th)	James Franco	James Dean	James Dean	TNT
2002 (54th)	Michael Gambon	Lyndon B. Johnson	Path to War	HBO
2003 (55th)
2003 (55th)	William H. Macy	Bill Porter	Door to Door	TNT
2003 (55th)	Brad Garrett	Jackie Gleason	Gleason	CBS
2003 (55th)	Paul Newman	Stage Manager	Our Town	Showtime
2003 (55th)	Tom Wilkinson	Roy Applewood	Normal	HBO
2003 (55th)	James Woods	Rudy Giuliani	Rudy: The Rudy Giuliani Story	USA
2004 (56th)
2004 (56th)	Al Pacino	Roy Cohn	Angels in America	HBO
2004 (56th)	Antonio Banderas	Pancho Villa	And Starring Pancho Villa as Himself	HBO
2004 (56th)	James Brolin	Ronald Reagan	The Reagans	Showtime
2004 (56th)	Mos Def	Vivien Thomas	Something the Lord Made	HBO
2004 (56th)	Alan Rickman	Dr. Alfred Blalock	Something the Lord Made	HBO
2005 (57th)
2005 (57th)	Geoffrey Rush	Peter Sellers	The Life and Death of Peter Sellers	HBO
2005 (57th)	Kenneth Branagh	Franklin D. Roosevelt	Warm Springs	HBO
2005 (57th)	Ed Harris	Miles Roby	Empire Falls	HBO
2005 (57th)	William H. Macy	Charles Gigot	The Wool Cap	TNT
2005 (57th)	Jonathan Rhys Meyers	Elvis Presley	Elvis	CBS
2006 (58th)
2006 (58th)	Andre Braugher	Nick Atwater	Thief	FX
2006 (58th)	Charles Dance	Mr. Tulkinghorn	Bleak House	PBS
2006 (58th)	Ben Kingsley	Dr. Herman Tarnower	Mrs. Harris	HBO
2006 (58th)	Donald Sutherland	Bill Meehan	Human Trafficking	Lifetime
2006 (58th)	Jon Voight	Pope John Paul II	Pope John Paul II	CBS
2007 (59th)
2007 (59th)	Robert Duvall	Prentice "Prent" Ritter	Broken Trail	AMC
2007 (59th)	Jim Broadbent	Lord Longford	Longford	HBO
2007 (59th)	William H. Macy	Det. Clyde Umney / Sam Landry	Nightmares & Dreamscapes: From the Stories of Stephen King: Umney's Last Case	TNT
2007 (59th)	Matthew Perry	Ron Clark	The Ron Clark Story	TNT
2007 (59th)	Tom Selleck	Jesse Stone	Jesse Stone: Sea Change	CBS
2008 (60th)
2008 (60th)	Paul Giamatti	John Adams	John Adams	HBO
2008 (60th)	Ralph Fiennes	Bernard Lafferty	Bernard and Doris	HBO
2008 (60th)	Ricky Gervais	Andy Millman	Extras: The Extra Special Series Finale	HBO
2008 (60th)	Kevin Spacey	Ron Klain	Recount	HBO
2008 (60th)	Tom Wilkinson	James Baker	Recount	HBO
2009 (61st)
2009 (61st)	Brendan Gleeson	Winston Churchill	Into the Storm	HBO
2009 (61st)	Kevin Bacon	Michael Strobl	Taking Chance	HBO
2009 (61st)	Kenneth Branagh	Kurt Wallander	Wallander: One Step Behind	PBS
2009 (61st)	Kevin Kline	Cyrano de Bergerac	Cyrano de Bergerac	PBS
2009 (61st)	Ian McKellen	King Lear	King Lear	PBS
2009 (61st)	Kiefer Sutherland	Jack Bauer	24: Redemption	Fox

=== 2010s ===
Year	Actor	Role	Program	Network
Outstanding Lead Actor in a Miniseries or Movie
2010 (62nd)
2010 (62nd)	Al Pacino	Dr. Jack Kevorkian	You Don't Know Jack	HBO
2010 (62nd)	Jeff Bridges	Jon Katz	A Dog Year	HBO
2010 (62nd)	Ian McKellen	Number Two / Curtis	The Prisoner	AMC
2010 (62nd)	Dennis Quaid	Bill Clinton	The Special Relationship	HBO
2010 (62nd)	Michael Sheen	Tony Blair	The Special Relationship	HBO
2011 (63rd)
2011 (63rd)	Barry Pepper	Robert F. Kennedy	The Kennedys	Reelz
2011 (63rd)	Idris Elba	John Luther	Luther	BBC America
2011 (63rd)	Laurence Fishburne	Thurgood Marshall	Thurgood	HBO
2011 (63rd)	William Hurt	Henry Paulson	Too Big to Fail	HBO
2011 (63rd)	Greg Kinnear	John F. Kennedy	The Kennedys	Reelz
2011 (63rd)	Édgar Ramírez	Ilich Ramírez Sánchez	Carlos	Sundance
2012 (64th)
2012 (64th)	Kevin Costner	Devil Anse Hatfield	Hatfields & McCoys	History
2012 (64th)	Benedict Cumberbatch	Sherlock Holmes	Sherlock: A Scandal in Belgravia	PBS
2012 (64th)	Idris Elba	John Luther	Luther	BBC America
2012 (64th)	Woody Harrelson	Steve Schmidt	Game Change	HBO
2012 (64th)	Clive Owen	Ernest Hemingway	Hemingway & Gellhorn	HBO
2012 (64th)	Bill Paxton	Randolph McCoy	Hatfields & McCoys	History
2013 (65th)
2013 (65th)	Michael Douglas	Liberace	Behind the Candelabra	HBO
2013 (65th)	Benedict Cumberbatch	Christopher Tietjens	Parade's End	HBO
2013 (65th)	Matt Damon	Scott Thorson	Behind the Candelabra	HBO
2013 (65th)	Toby Jones	Alfred Hitchcock	The Girl	HBO
2013 (65th)	Al Pacino	Phil Spector	Phil Spector	HBO
2014 (66th)
2014 (66th)	Benedict Cumberbatch	Sherlock Holmes	Sherlock: His Last Vow	PBS
2014 (66th)	Chiwetel Ejiofor	Louis Lester	Dancing on the Edge	Starz
2014 (66th)	Idris Elba	John Luther	Luther	BBC America
2014 (66th)	Martin Freeman	Lester Nygaard	Fargo	FX
2014 (66th)	Mark Ruffalo	Ned Weeks	The Normal Heart	HBO
2014 (66th)	Billy Bob Thornton	Lorne Malvo	Fargo	FX
Outstanding Lead Actor in a Limited Series or Movie
2015 (67th)
2015 (67th)	Richard Jenkins	Henry Kitteridge	Olive Kitteridge	HBO
2015 (67th)	Adrien Brody	Harry Houdini	Houdini	History
2015 (67th)	Ricky Gervais	Derek Noakes	Derek: The Special	Netflix
2015 (67th)	Timothy Hutton	Russ Skokie	American Crime	ABC
2015 (67th)	David Oyelowo	Peter Snowden	Nightingale	HBO
2015 (67th)	Mark Rylance	Thomas Cromwell	Wolf Hall	PBS
2016 (68th)
2016 (68th)	Courtney B. Vance	Johnnie Cochran	The People v. O. J. Simpson: American Crime Story	FX
2016 (68th)	Bryan Cranston	Lyndon B. Johnson	All the Way	HBO
2016 (68th)	Benedict Cumberbatch	Sherlock Holmes	Sherlock: The Abominable Bride	PBS
2016 (68th)	Idris Elba	John Luther	Luther	BBC America
2016 (68th)	Cuba Gooding Jr.	O. J. Simpson	The People v. O. J. Simpson: American Crime Story	FX
2016 (68th)	Tom Hiddleston	Jonathan Pine	The Night Manager	AMC
2017 (69th)
2017 (69th)	Riz Ahmed	Nasir "Naz" Khan	The Night Of	HBO
2017 (69th)	Benedict Cumberbatch	Sherlock Holmes	Sherlock: The Lying Detective	PBS
2017 (69th)	Robert De Niro	Bernie Madoff	The Wizard of Lies	HBO
2017 (69th)	Ewan McGregor	Ray Stussy / Emmit Stussy	Fargo	FX
2017 (69th)	Geoffrey Rush	Albert Einstein	Genius	Nat Geo
2017 (69th)	John Turturro	John Stone	The Night Of	HBO
2018 (70th)
2018 (70th)	Darren Criss	Andrew Cunanan	The Assassination of Gianni Versace: American Crime Story	FX
2018 (70th)	Antonio Banderas	Pablo Picasso	Genius: Picasso	Nat Geo
2018 (70th)	Benedict Cumberbatch	Patrick Melrose	Patrick Melrose	Showtime
2018 (70th)	Jeff Daniels	John O'Neill	The Looming Tower	Hulu
2018 (70th)	John Legend	Jesus Christ	Jesus Christ Superstar Live in Concert	NBC
2018 (70th)	Jesse Plemons	Captain Robert Daly	USS Callister (Black Mirror)	Netflix
2019 (71st)
2019 (71st)	Jharrel Jerome	Korey Wise	When They See Us	Netflix
2019 (71st)	Mahershala Ali	Wayne Hays	True Detective	HBO
2019 (71st)	Benicio del Toro	Richard Matt	Escape at Dannemora	Showtime
2019 (71st)	Hugh Grant	Jeremy Thorpe	A Very English Scandal	Prime Video
2019 (71st)	Jared Harris	Valery Legasov	Chernobyl	HBO
2019 (71st)	Sam Rockwell	Bob Fosse	Fosse/Verdon	FX

=== 2020s ===
Year	Actor	Role	Program	Network
Outstanding Lead Actor in a Limited Series or Movie
2020 (72nd)
2020 (72nd)	Mark Ruffalo	Dominick & Thomas Birdsey	I Know This Much Is True	HBO
2020 (72nd)	Jeremy Irons	Adrian Veidt / Ozymandias	Watchmen	HBO
2020 (72nd)	Hugh Jackman	Frank Tassone	Bad Education	HBO
2020 (72nd)	Paul Mescal	Connell Waldron	Normal People	Hulu
2020 (72nd)	Jeremy Pope	Archie Coleman	Hollywood	Netflix
Outstanding Lead Actor in a Limited or Anthology Series or Movie
2021 (73rd)
2021 (73rd)	Ewan McGregor	Halston	Halston	Netflix
2021 (73rd)	Paul Bettany	Vision	WandaVision	Disney+
2021 (73rd)	Hugh Grant	Jonathan Fraser	The Undoing	HBO
2021 (73rd)	Lin-Manuel Miranda	Alexander Hamilton	Hamilton	Disney+
2021 (73rd)	Leslie Odom Jr.	Aaron Burr	Hamilton	Disney+
2022 (74th)
2022 (74th)	Michael Keaton	Dr. Samuel Finnix	Dopesick	Hulu
2022 (74th)	Colin Firth	Michael Peterson	The Staircase	HBO Max
2022 (74th)	Andrew Garfield	Detective Jeb Pyre	Under the Banner of Heaven	FX
2022 (74th)	Oscar Isaac	Jonathan Levy	Scenes from a Marriage	HBO
2022 (74th)	Himesh Patel	Jeevan Chaudhary	Station Eleven	HBO Max
2022 (74th)	Sebastian Stan	Tommy Lee	Pam & Tommy	Hulu
2023 (75th)
2023 (75th)	Steven Yeun	Danny Cho	Beef	Netflix
2023 (75th)	Taron Egerton	Jimmy Keene	Black Bird	Apple TV+
2023 (75th)	Kumail Nanjiani	Somen "Steve" Banerjee	Welcome to Chippendales	Hulu
2023 (75th)	Evan Peters	Jeffrey Dahmer	Dahmer – Monster: The Jeffrey Dahmer Story	Netflix
2023 (75th)	Daniel Radcliffe	"Weird Al" Yankovic	Weird: The Al Yankovic Story	Roku
2023 (75th)	Michael Shannon	George Jones	George & Tammy	Showtime
2024 (76th)
2024 (76th)	Richard Gadd	Donny Dunn	Baby Reindeer	Netflix
2024 (76th)	Matt Bomer	Hawkins "Hawk" Fuller	Fellow Travelers	Showtime
2024 (76th)	Jon Hamm	Sheriff Roy Tillman	Fargo	FX
2024 (76th)	Tom Hollander	Truman Capote	Feud: Capote vs. The Swans	FX
2024 (76th)	Andrew Scott	Tom Ripley	Ripley	Netflix
2025 (77th)
2025 (77th)	Stephen Graham	Eddie Miller	Adolescence	Netflix
2025 (77th)	Colin Farrell	Oswald "Oz" Cobb	The Penguin	HBO
2025 (77th)	Jake Gyllenhaal	Rusty Sabich	Presumed Innocent	Apple TV+
2025 (77th)	Brian Tyree Henry	Ray Driscoll	Dope Thief	Apple TV+
2025 (77th)	Cooper Koch	Erik Menendez	Monsters: The Lyle and Erik Menendez Story	Netflix
2026 (78th)
2026 (78th)	Matthew Rhys	Nile Jarvis	The Beast in Me	Netflix
2026 (78th)	Riz Ahmed	Shah Latif	Bait	Prime Video
2026 (78th)	Jason Bateman	Vince Friedken	Black Rabbit	Netflix
2026 (78th)	Charlie Hunnam	Ed Gein	Monster: The Ed Gein Story	Netflix
2026 (78th)	Oscar Isaac	Joshua Martín	Beef	Netflix

== Programs with multiple wins ==
2 wins

- American Crime Story

== Performers with multiple wins ==
4 wins

- Laurence Olivier

3 wins

- Peter Ustinov

2 wins

- Fred Astaire
- Hume Cronyn
- Peter Falk
- Hal Holbrook
- Anthony Hopkins
- Al Pacino
- James Woods

== Programs with multiple nominations ==
13 nominations

- Hallmark Hall of Fame

7 nominations

- Playhouse 90

4 nominations

- Fargo
- Luther
- Sherlock

3 nominations

- American Crime Story
- CBS Playhouse
- The Dick Powell Theatre
- Monster
- Studio One

2 nominations

- An Early Frost
- Beef
- Behind the Candelabra
- Bob Hope Presents the Chrysler Theatre
- Brian's Song
- Brideshead Revisited
- Columbo
- The Defenders
- Ford Star Jubilee
- Genius
- Hamilton
- Hatfields & McCoys
- Holocaust
- The Kennedys
- Lonesome Dove
- Masada
- McCloud
- The Night Of
- Producers' Showcase
- Promise
- Recount
- Rich Man, Poor Man
- Shōgun
- Something the Lord Made
- The Special Relationship
- The United States Steel Hour

== Performers with multiple nominations ==
7 nominations

- Hal Holbrook

6 nominations

- Benedict Cumberbatch
- Laurence Olivier

5 nominations

- Beau Bridges
- James Garner
- Jack Lemmon
- Jason Robards
- Mickey Rooney
- George C. Scott
- James Woods

4 nominations

- Kenneth Branagh
- Richard Chamberlain
- Hume Cronyn
- Robert Duvall
- Idris Elba
- William H. Macy

3 nominations

- Lee J. Cobb
- Laurence Fishburne
- Peter Falk
- Henry Fonda
- Louis Gossett, Jr.
- Anthony Hopkins
- Ben Kingsley
- Fredric March
- Al Pacino
- Christopher Plummer
- Peter Strauss
- Peter Ustinov

2 nominations

- Riz Ahmed
- Alan Alda
- Alan Arkin
- Fred Astaire
- Antonio Banderas
- Robert Blake
- Michael Caine
- Brian Dennehy
- William Devane
- Melvyn Douglas
- Albert Finney
- Ricky Gervais
- John Gielgud
- Hugh Grant
- Alec Guinness
- Edward Herrmann
- Trevor Howard
- Jeremy Irons
- Oscar Isaac
- Tommy Lee Jones
- John Lithgow
- Ewan McGregor
- Ian McKellen
- Barry Pepper
- Sidney Poitier
- Alan Rickman
- Cliff Robertson
- Mark Ruffalo
- Geoffrey Rush
- Martin Sheen
- Gary Sinise
- Rod Steiger
- Dennis Weaver
- Tom Wilkinson
- Ed Wynn

== See also ==
- Actor Award for Outstanding Performance by a Male Actor in a Miniseries or Television Movie
- Best Actor
- Critics' Choice Television Award for Best Actor in a Movie/Miniseries
- Golden Globe Award for Best Actor – Miniseries or Television Film
- List of acting awards
- List of television awards for Best Actor
- Primetime Emmy Award for Outstanding Lead Actor in a Comedy Series
- Primetime Emmy Award for Outstanding Lead Actor in a Comedy Series
- Primetime Emmy Award for Outstanding Supporting Actor in a Comedy Series
- Primetime Emmy Award for Outstanding Supporting Actress in a Comedy Series
- Primetime Emmy Award for Outstanding Lead Actor in a Drama Series
- Primetime Emmy Award for Outstanding Lead Actress in a Drama Series
- Primetime Emmy Award for Outstanding Supporting Actor in a Drama Series
- Primetime Emmy Award for Outstanding Supporting Actress in a Drama Series
- Primetime Emmy Award for Outstanding Lead Actress in a Limited or Anthology Series or Movie
- Primetime Emmy Award for Outstanding Supporting Actor in a Limited or Anthology Series or Movie
- Primetime Emmy Award for Outstanding Supporting Actress in a Limited or Anthology Series or Movie
- TCA Award for Individual Achievement in Drama
