= 34th Primetime Emmy Awards =

1982 American television programming awards

- Date: September 19, 1982 (Ceremony); September 12, 1982 (Creative Arts Awards)
- Location: Pasadena Civic Auditorium, Pasadena, California
- Presented by: Academy of Television Arts and Sciences
- Hosted by: John Forsythe; Marlo Thomas

Highlights
- Most awards: Hill Street Blues (4)
- Most nominations: Hill Street Blues (16)
- Outstanding Comedy Series: Barney Miller
- Outstanding Drama Series: Hill Street Blues
- Outstanding Limited Series: Marco Polo
- Outstanding Variety, Music or Comedy Program: Night of 100 Stars
- Website: www.emmys.com/awards/nominees-winners/1982

Television/radio coverage
- Network: ABC

The 34th Primetime Emmy Awards were held on Sunday, September 19, 1982. The ceremony was broadcast on ABC. It was hosted by John Forsythe and Marlo Thomas. 25 awards were presented.

In its eighth and final season, Barney Miller finally won the Emmy for Outstanding Comedy Series, it had been nominated and lost the previous six seasons. On the drama side, it was once again all about Hill Street Blues. It set multiple records on the night, including receiving 16 major nominations (winning four), breaking the long-held record (subsequently broken) of 14 for a comedy or drama set by Playhouse 90 in 1959. It also received nine acting nominations for regular cast members, this has since been tied by L.A. Law, The West Wing and Game of Thrones. Included in those acting nominations was another milestone, Hill Street Blues received every nomination for Outstanding Supporting Actor in a Drama Series, this achievement has not been duplicated by a comedy or drama in a major acting category since. Another milestone was set by Andrea Martin, who became the first actor from a variety series, in this case Second City Television, to be nominated in the comedy acting field since the categories merged in 1979.

Ingrid Bergman won her final award posthumously, for A Woman Called Golda. It was not only the fourth posthumous acting award in Emmy history, but also the second performance ever to have won from a non-Network Syndicated show.

== Winners and nominees ==
=== Programs ===
Programs
Outstanding Comedy Series: Barney Miller (ABC); Love, Sidney (NBC); M*A*S*H (CBS); Taxi (ABC); WKRP in Cincinnati (CBS)	Outstanding Drama Series: Hill Street Blues (NBC); Dynasty (ABC); Fame (NBC); Lou Grant (CBS); Magnum, P.I. (CBS)
Outstanding Drama Special: A Woman Called Golda (Syndicated); Bill (CBS); The Elephant Man (ABC); Inside the Third Reich (ABC); Skokie (CBS)	Outstanding Limited Series: Marco Polo (NBC); Brideshead Revisited (PBS); Flickers (PBS); Oppenheimer (PBS); A Town Like Alice (PBS)
Outstanding Variety, Music or Comedy Program: Night of 100 Stars (ABC); AFI Life Achievement Award: A Tribute to Frank Capra (CBS); Ain't Misbehavin' (NBC); Baryshnikov in Hollywood (CBS); Second City Television (NBC)

=== Acting ===
==== Lead performances ====
Acting
Outstanding Lead Actor in a Comedy Series: Alan Alda as Hawkeye Pierce in M*A*S*H (CBS) (Episode: "Where There's a Will, There's a War"); Robert Guillaume as Benson DuBois in Benson (ABC); Judd Hirsch as Alex Reiger in Taxi (ABC); Hal Linden as Capt. Barney Miller in Barney Miller (ABC); Leslie Nielsen as Lieutenant Frank Drebin in Police Squad! (ABC)	Outstanding Lead Actress in a Comedy Series: Carol Kane as Simka Dahblitz in Taxi (ABC) (Episode: "Simka Returns"); Nell Carter as Nell Harper in Gimme a Break! (NBC); Bonnie Franklin as Ann Romano in One Day at a Time (CBS); Swoosie Kurtz as Laurie Morgan in Love, Sidney (NBC); Charlotte Rae as Edna Garrett in The Facts of Life (NBC); Isabel Sanford as Louise Jefferson in The Jeffersons (CBS)
Outstanding Lead Actor in a Drama Series: Daniel J. Travanti as Captain Frank Furillo in Hill Street Blues (NBC); Edward Asner as Lou Grant in Lou Grant (CBS); John Forsythe as Blake Carrington in Dynasty (ABC); James Garner as Bret Maverick in Bret Maverick (NBC); Tom Selleck as Thomas Magnum in Magnum, P.I. (CBS)	Outstanding Lead Actress in a Drama Series: Michael Learned as Mary Benjamin in Nurse (CBS); Debbie Allen as Lydia Grant in Fame (NBC); Veronica Hamel as Joyce Davenport in Hill Street Blues (NBC); Michele Lee as Karen Fairgate in Knots Landing (CBS); Stefanie Powers as Jennifer Hart in Hart to Hart (ABC)
Outstanding Lead Actor in a Limited Series or a Special: Mickey Rooney as Bill Sackter in Bill (CBS); Anthony Andrews as Sebastian Flyte in Brideshead Revisited (PBS); Philip Anglim as John Merrick in The Elephant Man (ABC); Anthony Hopkins as Quasimodo in The Hunchback of Notre Dame (CBS); Jeremy Irons as Charles Ryder in Brideshead Revisited (PBS)	Outstanding Lead Actress in a Limited Series or a Special: Ingrid Bergman as Golda Meir in A Woman Called Golda (Syndicated); Glenda Jackson as Patricia Neal in The Patricia Neal Story (CBS); Ann Jillian as Mae West in Mae West (ABC); Jean Stapleton as Eleanor Roosevelt in Eleanor, First Lady of the World (CBS); Cicely Tyson as Marva Collins in The Marva Collins Story (CBS)

==== Supporting performances ====
Outstanding Supporting Actor in a Comedy or Variety or Music Series: Christopher Lloyd as Jim Ignatowski in Taxi (ABC) (Episode: "Elegant Iggy"); Danny DeVito as Louie De Palma in Taxi (ABC); Ron Glass as Det. Ron Harris in Barney Miller (ABC); Steve Landesberg as Sgt. Arthur Dietrich in Barney Miller (ABC); Harry Morgan as Sherman T. Potter in M*A*S*H (CBS); David Ogden Stiers as Charles Emerson Winchester III in M*A*S*H (CBS)	Outstanding Supporting Actress in a Comedy or Variety or Music Series: Loretta Swit as Margaret Houlihan in M*A*S*H (CBS) (Episode: "The Birthday Girls"); Eileen Brennan as Doreen Lewis in Private Benjamin (CBS); Marla Gibbs as Florence Johnston in The Jeffersons (CBS); Andrea Martin as Various Characters in Second City Television (NBC); Anne Meara as Veronica Rooney in Archie Bunker's Place (CBS) (Episode: "Relapse"); Inga Swenson as Gretchen Wilomena Kraus in Benson (ABC)
Outstanding Supporting Actor in a Drama Series: Michael Conrad as Sgt. Phil Esterhaus in Hill Street Blues (NBC); Taurean Blacque as Det. Neal Washington in Hill Street Blues (NBC); Charles Haid as Officer Andy Renko in Hill Street Blues (NBC); Michael Warren as Officer Bobby Hill in Hill Street Blues (NBC); Bruce Weitz as Detective Mick Belker in Hill Street Blues (NBC)	Outstanding Supporting Actress in a Drama Series: Nancy Marchand as Margaret Pynchon in Lou Grant (CBS) (Episode: "Review"); Barbara Bosson as Fay Furillo in Hill Street Blues (NBC); Julie Harris as Lilimae Clements in Knots Landing (CBS); Linda Kelsey as Billie Newman in Lou Grant (CBS); Betty Thomas as Sgt. Lucille Bates in Hill Street Blues (NBC)
Outstanding Supporting Actor in a Limited Series or a Special: Laurence Olivier as Lord Marchmain in Brideshead Revisited (PBS) (Episode: "Brideshead Revisited"); Jack Albertson as Poppa MacMahon in My Body, My Child (ABC); John Gielgud as Edward Ryder in Brideshead Revisited (PBS) (Episode: "Et in Arcadia Ego"); Derek Jacobi as Adolf Hitler in Inside the Third Reich (ABC); Leonard Nimoy as Morris Meyerson in A Woman Called Golda (Syndicated)	Outstanding Supporting Actress in a Limited Series or a Special: Penny Fuller as Mrs. Kendal in The Elephant Man (ABC); Claire Bloom as Lady Marchmain in Brideshead Revisited (PBS) (Episode: "Sebastian Against the World"); Judy Davis as Young Golda in A Woman Called Golda (Syndicated); Vicki Lawrence as Thelma "Mama" Harper in Eunice (CBS); Rita Moreno as Rosella DeLeon in Portrait of a Showgirl (CBS)

=== Directing ===
Directing
Outstanding Directing in a Comedy Series: One Day at a Time (CBS): "Barbara's Crisis" – Alan Rafkin; M*A*S*H (CBS): "Picture This" – Burt Metcalfe; M*A*S*H (CBS): "Pressure Points" – Charles S. Dubin; M*A*S*H (CBS): "Sons and Bowlers" – Hy Averback; M*A*S*H (CBS): "Where There's a Will, There's a War" – Alan Alda; Taxi (ABC): "Jim the Psychic" – James Burrows	Outstanding Directing in a Drama Series: Fame (NBC): "To Soar and Never Falter" – Harry Harris; Fame (NBC): "Musical Bridge" – Robert Scheerer; Hill Street Blues (NBC): "The Second Oldest Profession" – Robert Butler; Hill Street Blues (NBC): "The World According to Freedom" – Jeff Bleckner; Lou Grant (CBS): "Hometown" – Gene Reynolds
Outstanding Directing in a Variety or Music Program: Goldie and Kids: Listen to Us (ABC) – Dwight Hemion; The 54th Annual Academy Awards (ABC) – Marty Pasetta; Baryshnikov in Hollywood (CBS) – Don Mischer; Live from Lincoln Center: "An Evening with Danny Kaye and the New York Philharmonic" (PBS) – Robert Scheerer; Night of 100 Stars (ABC) – Clark Jones	Outstanding Directing in a Limited Series or a Special: Inside the Third Reich (ABC) – Marvin J. Chomsky; Brideshead Revisited (PBS): "Et in Arcadia Ego" – Charles Sturridge and Michael Lindsay-Hogg; Mae West (ABC) – Lee Philips; Skokie (CBS) – Herbert Wise

=== Writing ===
Writing
Outstanding Writing in a Comedy Series: Taxi (ABC): "Elegant Iggy" – Ken Estin; Barney Miller (ABC): "Landmark, Part III" – Frank Dungan, Jeff Stein and Tony Sheehan; M*A*S*H (CBS): "Follies of the Living - Concerns of the Dead" – Alan Alda; Police Squad! (ABC): "A Substantial Gift" – Jim Abrahams, David Zucker and Jerry Zucker; Taxi (ABC): "Jim the Psychic" – Story by : Holly Holmberg Brooks Teleplay by : Barry Kemp	Outstanding Writing in a Drama Series: Hill Street Blues (NBC): "Freedom's Last Stand" – Story by : Michael Kozoll and Steven Bochco Teleplay by : Steven Bochco, Anthony Yerkovich, Jeffrey Lewis and Michael Wagner; Hill Street Blues (NBC): "Personal Foul" – Steven Bochco, Anthony Yerkovich, Jeffrey Lewis and Michael Wagner; Hill Street Blues (NBC): "The Second Oldest Profession" – Story by : Michael Kozoll, Steven Bochco and Anthony Yerkovich Teleplay by : Steven Bochco, Anthony Yerkovich and Robert Crais; Hill Street Blues (NBC): "The World According to Freedom" – Michael Wagner; Lou Grant (CBS): "Blacklist" – Seth Freeman
Outstanding Writing in a Variety, Music or Comedy Program: Second City Television (NBC): "Moral Majority Show"; I Love Liberty (ABC); Second City Television (NBC): "Christmas Show"; Second City Television (NBC): "Cycle Two, Show Two"; Second City Television (NBC): "Tony Bennett"	Outstanding Writing in a Limited Series or a Special: Bill (CBS) – Story by : Barry Morrow Teleplay by : Corey Blechman; Brideshead Revisited (PBS): "Et in Arcadia Ego" – John Mortimer; Oppenheimer (PBS): "Part V" – Peter Prince; Sidney Shorr: A Girl's Best Friend (NBC) – Oliver Hailey; Skokie (CBS) – Ernest Kinoy

== Most major nominations ==
Networks with multiple major nominations (Note: "Major" constitutes the categories listed above: Program, Acting, Directing, and Writing. Does not include the technical categories.)
Network	Number of Nominations
CBS	43
ABC	34
NBC	34
PBS	13

Programs with multiple major nominations
Program	Category	Network	Number of Nominations
Hill Street Blues	Drama	NBC	16
M*A*S*H	Comedy	CBS	10
Brideshead Revisited	Miniseries	PBS	8
Taxi	Comedy	ABC	8
Lou Grant	Drama	CBS	6
Second City Television	Variety	NBC	6
Barney Miller	Comedy	ABC	5
A Woman Called Golda	Special	Syndicated	4
Bill	Special	CBS	3
The Elephant Man	Special	ABC	3
Inside the Third Reich	Special	ABC	3
Skokie	Special	CBS	3
Baryshnikov in Hollywood	Variety	CBS	2
Benson	Comedy	ABC	2
Dynasty	Drama	ABC	2
The Jeffersons	Comedy	CBS	2
Knots Landing	Drama	CBS	2
Love, Sidney	Comedy	NBC	2
Mae West	Special	ABC	2
Magnum, P.I.	Drama	CBS	2
Night of 100 Stars	Variety	ABC	2
One Day at a Time	Comedy	CBS	2
Oppenheimer	Limited	PBS	2
Police Squad!	Comedy	ABC	2

== Most major awards ==
Networks with multiple major awards
Network	Number of Awards
ABC	8
CBS	7
NBC	7
Syndicated	2

Programs with multiple major awards
Program	Category	Network	Number of Awards
Hill Street Blues	Drama	NBC	4
Taxi	Comedy	ABC	3
Bill	Special	CBS	2
M*A*S*H	Comedy	CBS	2
A Woman Called Golda	Special	Syndicated	2
