= Largo Woodruff =

American actress

- Born: July 18, 1955 (age 70); New Jersey, U.S.
- Occupation: Actress
- Years active: 1978–2003
- Spouse: Frederic Blankfein (m. 1979)

Largo Woodruff (born July 18, 1955) is an American actress who appeared in numerous films in the 1980s. She began her career appearing in commercials before landing a bit part in Woody Allen's Stardust Memories (1980). Her first major featured role was in Tobe Hooper's slasher film The Funhouse (1981). She also appeared in the controversial television film The Choice (1981), as well as the biopic Bill (1981) and its 1983 sequel. Also in 1981, she was one of the main characters in the Kenny Rogers movie Coward of the County, based on the song of the same name.

== Life and career ==
=== Early life ===
Largo Woodruff was born July 18, 1955 in New Jersey to Wallace and Maxine Woodruff, the second of three children. She has one elder sister, Allegro, a writer, and a younger brother, Lento, a carpenter and offshore oil rigger. Woodruff's father was a professional orchestra musician, and her parents named her and her brothers after musical tempos, with her name, Largo, meaning a wide or broadly slow tempo.

Woodruff was raised in the Panama Canal Zone from age 2. As a child, she studied various dance as well as cello and guitar. At age 18, she relocated to New York City with the hopes of becoming an actress, and enrolled at the American Academy of Dramatic Arts.

=== Career ===
After relocating to New York, Woodruff was hired as a dancer in an off-Broadway theatrical production, and also began acting in television commercials, appearing in advertisements for A&W Root Beer, Kraft Foods, Mounds Candy and Ruffles. She had minor bit parts in Fingers (1978) and Woody Allen's Stardust Memories (1980). Also in 1980, she appeared in an ABC Afterschool Special entitled "Stoned." Her first major feature film role was as Liz Duncan in Tobe Hooper's slasher film The Funhouse (1981), filmed in Miami. She also appeared in the controversial television drama film The Choice (1981) opposite Susan Clark and Mitchell Ryan, which followed a young woman who undergoes an abortion. The same year, she had a leading role in the television film Bill, a biopic about Bill Sackter starring Mickey Rooney and Dennis Quaid. She reprised her role for the film's sequel, Bill: On His Own (1983).

In 1986, Woodruff appeared in a supporting role in the rape and revenge film The Ladies Club, and in 1990 had a role in Perry Mason: The Case of the Poisoned Pen. She subsequently appeared in the television film Bare Essentials (1991) and Taking the Heat (1993). Woodruff had a minor role in the 1999 drama film My Last Love, and subsequently appeared in a bit part in the horror film Jeepers Creepers 2 (2003).

== Filmography ==
=== Film ===
Year	Title	Role	Notes	Ref.
1978	Fingers	Dreems' Girl		
1980	Stardust Memories	UFO Follower		
1980	ABC Afterschool Special: Stoned	Felicity	Television film	
1981	Word of Honor	Amy	Television film	
1981	The Funhouse	Liz Duncan		
1981	The Choice	Lisa Clements	Television film	
1981	Coward of the County	Becky	Television film	
1981	Bill	Beverly Morrow	Television film	
1983	Bill: On His Own	Beverly Morrow	Television film	
1986	The Ladies Club	Terry		
1990	Perry Mason: The Case of the Poisoned Pen	Judy Fulmer	Television film	
1991	Bare Essentials	Lois Rice	Television film	
1993	Taking the Heat	Alice	Television film	
1994	Couples	Co-worker	Television film	
1996	For the Future: The Irvine Fertility Scandal	Marlene	Television film	
1999	My Last Love	Margaret	Television film	
2003	Jeepers Creepers 2	Woman in Car		
