= Clayton Morrow =

American animator

- Born: Clayton McKenzie Morrow; July 3, 1974 (age 52); Hennepin County, Minnesota, U.S.
- Other names: Clay Morrow; Clayton M. Morrow
- Occupations: Animator, writer, director, storyboard artist, storyboard director
- Years active: 1997–present
- Spouse: Cindy Morrow (m. 1998)
- Children: 1
- Father: Barry Morrow

Clayton McKenzie Morrow (born July 3, 1974) is an American animator, writer, director, storyboard artist and storyboard director. He is the son of Oscar and Emmy winning screenwriter Barry Morrow.

== Life and career ==
Morrow was born in July 1974 to Emmy and Oscar award-winning screenwriter Barry Morrow (born 1948) in Hennepin County, Minnesota. He is sometimes credited as Clayton M. Morrow and Clay Morrow (not to be confused with the fictional character of the same name). He was portrayed as a youth in the movies Bill and Bill: On His Own. He graduated from Claremont High School in 1992. He then attended California Institute of the Arts from 1992 to 1996, focusing on Character Animation. He has been married to Cindy Morrow, who is also an animator, since December 1, 1998. They have one child.

For Dexter's Laboratory, created by Genndy Tartakovsky, he served as one of the storyboard artists for 13 episodes, later working on The Powerpuff Girls, created by Craig McCracken, for 8 episodes. In 2001, he wrote and storyboarded the television film The Flintstones: On the Rocks, based on the cartoon series sitcom by Hanna-Barbera. His wife Cindy also wrote and storyboarded the film. He has a long history at Cartoon Network, including writing on The Grim Adventures of Billy & Mandy for two episodes.

He then worked at Disney Television Animation, in which he worked on Paul Rudish's Mickey Mouse shorts from 2013 until 2016, later returning from 2018 to 2019 but was not involved in its sequel series The Wonderful World of Mickey Mouse. He served as the storyboard director for Camp Lazlo for 15 episodes and worked on Chowder for 9 episodes. Morrow serves as the supervising director for The Cuphead Show!, which was released on Netflix in 2022. Morrow also worked on Kick Buttowski: Suburban Daredevil from 2011 until 2012 and served as the dialogue director and supervising producer for Billy Dilley's Super-Duper Subterranean Summer

Morrow was also a story artist for the 2011 DreamWorks Animation film, Puss in Boots, serving as an spin-off to the Shrek film series, also again serving as a story artist for Foster's Home for Imaginary Friends, and Secret Mountain Fort Awesome. He was also the retake director for Wander Over Yonder and served as a writer on Fish Hooks for only an episode. Currently, Morrow is a storyboard artist on The Patrick Star Show and was a freelance storyboard punch-up on Seasons 14 and 15 of SpongeBob SquarePants.

== Filmography ==
=== Director ===
- 2011–2012: Kick Buttowski: Suburban Daredevil (with Chris Savino)
- 2013–2016, 2018–2019: Mickey Mouse
- 2013–2014: Wander Over Yonder (retake director)
- 2017: Billy Dilley's Super-Duper Subterranean Summer (supervising producer and dialogue director)
- 2022: The Cuphead Show! (supervising director)

=== Storyboard artist ===
- 1998–2003: Dexter's Laboratory - 13 episodes
- 1998–2001: The Powerpuff Girls - 8 episodes
- 2001: The Flintstones: On the Rocks - TV movie
- 2002: Whatever Happened to... Robot Jones? - 3 episodes
- 2004–2005: Foster's Home for Imaginary Friends - 3 episodes
- 2006: Yin Yang Yo! - 1 episode
- 2007: The Grim Adventures of Billy & Mandy - 2 episodes
- 2007–2010: Chowder - 9 episodes
- 2010–2012: Kick Buttowski: Suburban Daredevil - 6 episodes
- 2010: Fish Hooks - 1 episode
- 2011–2012: Secret Mountain Fort Awesome - 3 episodes
- 2011: Puss in Boots - Feature film
- 2013–2016, 2018–2019: Mickey Mouse
- 2017: Billy Dilley's Super-Duper Subterranean Summer
- 2023-present: The Patrick Star Show
- 2025: Haha, You Clowns

=== Writer ===
- 2000-2001: The Powerpuff Girls - 4 episodes
- 2001: The Flintstones: On the Rocks - TV movie
- 2002: Whatever Happened to... Robot Jones? - 3 episodes
- 2002–2003: Dexter's Laboratory - 6 episodes
- 2005–2007: Camp Lazlo - 16 episodes
- 2010–2012: Kick Buttowski: Suburban Daredevil - 2 episodes
- 2010: Fish Hooks - 1 episode
- 2011–2012: Secret Mountain Fort Awesome - 3 episodes
- 2013–2016, 2018–2019: Mickey Mouse
- 2017: Billy Dilley's Super-Duper Subterranean Summer
- 2022: The Cuphead Show! - 12 episodes (with Deeki Deke, Adam Paloian, Cosmo Segurson & Dave Wasson)

=== Story ===
- 2001–2003: Dexter's Laboratory - 26 episodes
- 2004: The Powerpuff Girls - 1 episode
- 2005: Foster's Home for Imaginary Friends - 1 episode
- 2007–2010: Chowder - 9 episodes

=== Storyboard Director ===
- 2005–2007: Camp Lazlo - 15 episodes

=== Storyboard Punch-Up ===
- 2023-2024: SpongeBob SquarePants
