= Rain Man =

1988 film directed by Barry Levinson

- Theatrical release poster by John Alvin
- Directed by: Barry Levinson
- Screenplay by: Barry Morrow; Ronald Bass
- Story by: Barry Morrow
- Produced by: Mark Johnson
- Starring: Dustin Hoffman; Tom Cruise; Valeria Golino
- Cinematography: John Seale
- Edited by: Stu Linder
- Music by: Hans Zimmer
- Production companies: United Artists; Guber-Peters Company; Star Partners II, Ltd.
- Distributed by: MGM/UA Communications Co.
- Release dates: December 12, 1988 (Premiere); December 16, 1988
- Running time: 134 minutes
- Country: United States
- Language: English
- Budget: $25 million
- Box office: $354.8–429.4 million

Rain Man is a 1988 American road comedy-drama film directed by Barry Levinson and written by Barry Morrow and Ronald Bass. It tells the story of abrasive and selfish wheeler-dealer Charlie Babbitt (Tom Cruise), who discovers that his estranged father Sanford has died and bequeathed his multimillion-dollar estate to his other son, Raymond (Dustin Hoffman), an autistic savant of whose existence Charlie was unaware. Morrow created the character of Raymond after meeting real-life savant Kim Peek; his characterization was based on both Peek and Bill Sackter, a good friend of Morrow who was the subject of Bill, an earlier film that Morrow wrote.

Rain Man competed at the 39th Berlin International Film Festival, where it won the highest prize: the Golden Bear. The film was released theatrically by MGM/UA Communications Co. under the United Artists label in the United States on December 16, 1988, to critical and commercial success. Praise was given to Levinson's direction, the performances (particularly Cruise and Hoffman), the screenplay, the musical score, the cinematography and the film's portrayal of autism. The film grossed US$354–$429 million on a $25 million budget, becoming the highest-grossing film of 1988, and received a leading eight nominations at the 61st Academy Awards, winning four: Best Picture, Best Director, Best Actor (for Hoffman) and Best Original Screenplay.

== Plot ==
Charlie Babbitt is an arrogant collectibles dealer in the middle of importing four grey market Lamborghinis to Los Angeles for resale. He needs to deliver the cars to impatient buyers who have already made down payments to repay the loan he took out to buy them, but the EPA is holding the cars at the port because they have failed emission tests. Charlie directs his employee Lenny to lie to the buyers while he stalls his creditor Wyatt.

When Charlie learns that his estranged father Sanford Babbitt has died, he and his girlfriend Susanna travel to Cincinnati to settle the estate. He inherits only a group of rosebushes and a classic 1949 Buick Roadmaster convertible over which he and Sanford had clashed, while the remainder of the $3 million estate is going to an unnamed trustee. He learns that the money is being directed to a local mental institution, where he meets his elder brother Raymond, of whom he was unaware.

Raymond is an autistic savant and follows strict routines. He has superb recall, but he shows little emotional expression, except when in distress. Charlie spirits Raymond out of the mental institution and into a hotel for the night. Disheartened with the way Charlie treats Raymond, Susanna leaves him. Charlie asks Raymond's doctor, Dr. Gerald Bruner, for half the estate in exchange for Raymond's return but Dr. Bruner refuses. Charlie decides to attempt to gain custody of Raymond to get control of the money.

After Raymond refuses to fly to Los Angeles, he and Charlie resort to driving there instead. They make slow progress because Raymond insists on following his routines, which include watching The People's Court on television every day, getting to bed by 11:00 p.m. and refusing to travel when it rains. He also objects to traveling on the Interstate after they encounter a car accident.

During the course of the journey, Charlie learns more about Raymond, including his ability to instantly perform complex calculations and count hundreds of objects at once, far beyond the typical range of human abilities. He also realizes that Raymond had lived with the family as a child and was the "Rain Man" (Charlie's infantile pronunciation of "Raymond"), a comforting figure Charlie had remembered as an imaginary friend. Raymond had saved an infant Charlie from being scalded by hot bathwater one day, but Sanford blamed Raymond for nearly injuring Charlie and committed him to the institution, as he was unable to speak up for himself and correct the misunderstanding.

Wyatt repossesses the Lamborghinis, forcing Charlie to refund his buyers' down payments and leaving him deeply in debt. Having passed Las Vegas, he and Raymond return to Caesars Palace and devise a plan to win the needed money by playing blackjack and counting cards with Raymond's abilities. Although the casino bosses obtain videotape evidence of the scheme and ask them to leave, Charlie successfully wins $86,000 to cover his debts. He also reconciles with Susanna, who has rejoined the brothers in Las Vegas.

Returning to Los Angeles, Charlie meets with Dr. Bruner, who offers him $250,000 to walk away from Raymond. Charlie refuses, saying he is no longer upset about being cut out of Sanford's will but he wants to have a relationship with Raymond. At a meeting with court-appointed psychiatrist Dr. Marston, Raymond proves to be unable to decide for himself what he wants. Charlie stops the questioning and tells Raymond he is happy to have him as his brother. As Raymond and Dr. Bruner board a train to return to the institution, Charlie promises to visit in two weeks.

== Cast ==
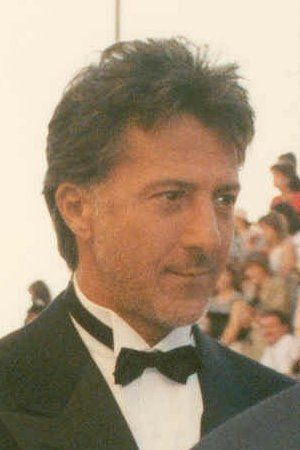
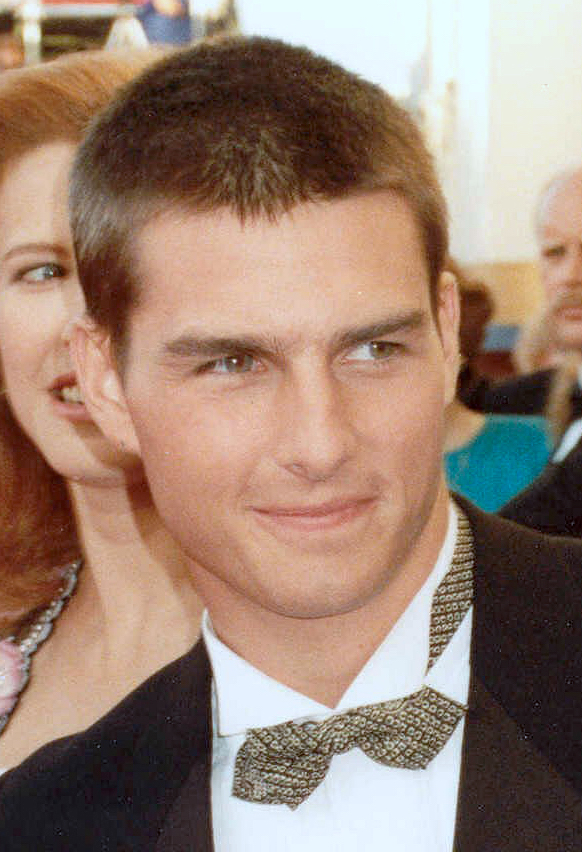
(left-to-right) Dustin Hoffman and Tom Cruise (pictured in 1989) played the Babbitt brothers, Raymond and Charlie respectively.
- Dustin Hoffman as Raymond Babbitt
- Tom Cruise as Charlie Babbitt
- Valeria Golino as Susanna
- Jerry Molen as Dr. Gerald Bruner
- Jack Murdock as John Mooney
- Michael D. Roberts as Vern
- Ralph Seymour as Lenny
- Lucinda Jenney as Iris
- Bonnie Hunt as Sally Dibbs
- Kim Robillard as Small Town Doctor
- Beth Grant as Farmhouse Mother
- Bob Heckel as Sheriff Deputy
- Ray Baker as Mr. Kelso
- Jocko Marcellino as Crooner
- Jake Hoffman as Pancake Boy
- Barry Levinson as Dr. Marston (uncredited)

== Production ==
=== Development ===
A now-abandoned gas station and general store in Cogar, Oklahoma, was used in a scene from the film. The Colvert sign has since been removed, revealing the full name of the business.

In drafting the story for Rain Man, Barry Morrow decided to base Raymond Babbitt on his experiences with both Kim Peek and Bill Sackter, two men who had gained notoriety and fame for their intellectual disabilities and, in Peek's case, for his abilities as a savant that were evident in high speed reading and extremely detailed memory. Prior to the conception of Rain Man, Morrow had formed a friendship with the intellectually disabled Sackter, and, in doing so, ended up taking some situational aspects from his friendship and using them to help craft the relationship between Charlie and Raymond.

Following the success of Bill, the made-for-TV movie he had written about Sackter, Morrow met Peek and was wildly intrigued by his savant syndrome. Going into the creation of the film, Morrow was still essentially unaware of the intricacies of the condition, as well as of autism itself; instead deciding that the movie was less about Raymond's intellectual disability, and more about the relationship formed between Raymond and Charlie. Roger Birnbaum was the first studio executive to give the film a green light; he did so immediately after Morrow pitched the story. Birnbaum received "special thanks" in the film's credits.

Real-life brothers Dennis and Randy Quaid were considered for the roles of Raymond and Charlie. Agents at Creative Artists Agency sent the script to Dustin Hoffman and Bill Murray, envisioning Murray in the title role and Hoffman in the role eventually portrayed by Tom Cruise. Martin Brest, Steven Spielberg and Sydney Pollack were directors also involved in the film. Spielberg was attached to the film for five months until he left to direct Indiana Jones and the Last Crusade and would later regret the decision. Mickey Rourke was also offered a role, but he turned it down. Mel Gibson was also offered the role of Raymond, but he turned it down also.

For a year prior to playing Raymond, Hoffman prepared to portray Raymond's autism by seeking out and educating himself on other autistic people, particularly those with savant syndrome. Hoffman had some experience with disabled individuals prior to filming, having worked at the New York Psychiatric Institute when he was younger. Inspiration for the portrayal of Raymond's mannerisms was drawn from a multitude of sources but he thanked three men in his Academy Award acceptance speech. One was Peter Guthrie, the autistic brother of Kevin Guthrie, a Princeton football player with whom Hoffman was in touch at the time. Another was autistic savant Joseph Sullivan, who was the subject of the documentary films Infantile Autism: The Invisible Wall (1968) and Portrait of an Autistic Young Man (1986), and whose mother, Dr. Ruth Sullivan, was the founding president of the Autism Society of America and served as a consultant on the film. The third was savant Kim Peek, with whom Hoffman met as part of his research of the role, wherein he would observe and mimic Peek's actions, attempting to give an accurate portrayal of what an individual with savant syndrome might act like. His mimicry of Peek's savant syndrome was deemed a poor fit for the character by Hoffman, resulting in Hoffman's decision to make Babbitt not only a man with savant syndrome but also with autism.

=== Filming ===
Principal photography included nine weeks of filming on location in Cincinnati and throughout Northern Kentucky. Other portions were shot in the desert near Palm Springs, California. There was originally a different ending to the movie drafted by Morrow that differed from Raymond's going back to the institution. Morrow ultimately decided to drop this ending in favor of Raymond's returning to the institution, as he felt the original ending would not have stuck with the viewers as effectively as the revised ending did. Almost all of the principal photography occurred during the 1988 Writers Guild of America strike; one key scene that was affected by the lack of writers was the film's final scene. Bass delivered his last draft of the script only hours before the strike started and spent no time on the set.

=== Music ===
The original motion picture soundtrack of Rain Man was composed by Hans Zimmer and was nominated for Best Original Score at the 61st Academy Awards.

== Release ==
The film had its premiere on December 12, 1988 at Loew's Astor Plaza in New York City and opened in the United States on December 16, 1988.

== Reception ==
=== Box office ===
Rain Man was the second highest-grossing film in its opening weekend box office (behind Twins), with $7 million. It reached the first spot the weekend of December 30 – January 2, finishing 1988 with $42 million. The film became the highest-grossing U.S. film of 1988 by earning more than $172 million. Worldwide figures vary: Box Office Mojo stated that the film grossed over $354 million, The Numbers stated $413 million, and Variety stated $429 million.

=== Critical response ===
On review aggregator website Rotten Tomatoes, Rain Man holds an approval rating of 88%, based on 136 reviews, with an average rating of 8.10/10. The website's critical consensus states: "This road-trip movie about an autistic savant and his callow brother is far from seamless, but Barry Levinson's direction is impressive, and strong performances from Tom Cruise and Dustin Hoffman add to its appeal." Metacritic assigned the film a weighted average score of 65 out of 100, based on 18 critics, indicating "generally favorable reviews". Audiences polled by CinemaScore gave the film an average grade of "A", on a scale of A+ to F.

Vincent Canby of The New York Times said Rain Man was a "becomingly modest, decently thought-out, sometimes funny film" and that Hoffman's performance was:

a display of sustained virtuosity ... [that] makes no lasting connections with the emotions. Its end effect depends largely on one's susceptibility to the sight of an actor acting nonstop and extremely well, but to no particularly urgent dramatic purpose.

Canby considered the "film's true central character" to be "the confused, economically and emotionally desperate Charlie, beautifully played by Mr. Cruise." Roger Ebert gave the film three and a half stars out of four. He wrote:

Hoffman proves again that he almost seems to thrive on impossible acting challenges. ... I felt a certain love for Raymond, the Hoffman character. I don't know quite how Hoffman got me to do it.

Gene Siskel also gave the film three and a half stars out of four, singling out Cruise for praise: "The strength of the film is really that of Cruise's performance...the combination of two superior performances makes the movie worth watching."

Amy Dawes of Variety wrote that "one of the year's most intriguing film premises ... is given uneven, slightly off-target treatment"; she called the road scenes "hastily, loosely written, with much extraneous screen time", but admired the last third of the film, calling it a depiction of "two very isolated beings" who "discover a common history and deep attachment".

One of the film's harshest reviews came from The New Yorker magazine critic Pauline Kael, who said, "Everything in this movie is fudged ever so humanistically, in a perfunctory, low-pressure way. And the picture has its effectiveness: people are crying at it. Of course they're crying at it—it's a piece of wet kitsch."

Rain Man was placed on 39 critics' "ten best" lists in 1988, based on a poll of the nation's top 100 critics.

=== Accolades ===
Award	Category	Nominee(s)	Result
Academy Awards	Best Picture	Mark Johnson	Won
Academy Awards	Best Director	Barry Levinson	Won
Academy Awards	Best Actor	Dustin Hoffman	Won
Academy Awards	Best Screenplay – Written Directly for the Screen	Ronald Bass and Barry Morrow	Won
Academy Awards	Best Art Direction	Ida Random and Linda DeScenna	Nominated
Academy Awards	Best Cinematography	John Seale	Nominated
Academy Awards	Best Film Editing	Stu Linder	Nominated
Academy Awards	Best Original Score	Hans Zimmer	Nominated
American Cinema Editors Awards	Best Edited Feature Film	Stu Linder	Won
American Society of Cinematographers Awards	Outstanding Achievement in Cinematography in Theatrical Releases	John Seale	Nominated
Berlin International Film Festival	Golden Bear	Barry Levinson	Won
Berlin International Film Festival	Berliner Morgenpost Readers' Jury Award	Barry Levinson	Won
BMI Film & TV Awards	Film Music Award	Hans Zimmer	Won
British Academy Film Awards	Best Actor in a Leading Role	Dustin Hoffman	Nominated
British Academy Film Awards	Best Original Screenplay	Ronald Bass and Barry Morrow	Nominated
British Academy Film Awards	Best Editing	Stu Linder	Nominated
César Awards	Best Foreign Film	Barry Levinson	Nominated
Chicago Film Critics Association Awards	Best Actor	Dustin Hoffman	Nominated
David di Donatello Awards	Best Foreign Film	Barry Levinson	Won
David di Donatello Awards	Best Foreign Director	Barry Levinson	Nominated
David di Donatello Awards	Best Foreign Actor	Dustin Hoffman	Won
David di Donatello Awards	Best Foreign Producer	Mark Johnson	Nominated
David di Donatello Awards	Best Foreign Screenplay	Ronald Bass and Barry Morrow	Nominated
Directors Guild of America Awards	Outstanding Directorial Achievement in Motion Pictures	Barry Levinson	Won
Golden Globe Awards	Best Motion Picture – Drama		Won
Golden Globe Awards	Best Actor in a Motion Picture – Drama	Dustin Hoffman	Won
Golden Globe Awards	Best Director – Motion Picture	Barry Levinson	Nominated
Golden Globe Awards	Best Screenplay – Motion Picture	Ronald Bass and Barry Morrow	Nominated
Goldene Kamera (1989)	Golden Screen		Won
Goldene Kamera (1991)	Golden Screen with 1 Star		Won
Heartland Film	Truly Moving Picture Award	Barry Levinson	Won
Japan Academy Film Prize	Outstanding Foreign Language Film		Nominated
Jupiter Awards	Best International Film	Barry Levinson	Won
Kansas City Film Critics Circle Awards	Best Film		Won
Kansas City Film Critics Circle Awards	Best Director	Barry Levinson	Won
Kansas City Film Critics Circle Awards	Best Actor	Dustin Hoffman	Won
Kansas City Film Critics Circle Awards	Best Supporting Actor	Tom Cruise	Won (Note: Tied with Martin Landau for Tucker: The Man and His Dream and Dean Stockwell for Married to the Mob)
Kinema Junpo Awards	Best Foreign Language Film	Barry Levinson	Won
Mainichi Film Awards	Best Foreign Language Film	Barry Levinson	Won
MTV Video Music Awards	Best Video from a Film	"Iko Iko" – The Belle Stars	Nominated
Nastro d'Argento	Best Foreign Director	Barry Levinson	Nominated
Nastro d'Argento	Best Supporting Actress	Valeria Golino	Nominated
National Society of Film Critics Awards	Best Actor	Dustin Hoffman	3rd Place
New York Film Critics Circle Awards	Best Actor	Dustin Hoffman	2nd Place
Nikkan Sports Film Awards	Best Foreign Film		Won
People's Choice Awards	Favorite Dramatic Motion Picture		Won
Turkish Film Critics Association Awards	Best Foreign Film		2nd Place
Writers Guild of America Awards	Best Screenplay – Written Directly for the Screen	Ronald Bass and Barry Morrow	Nominated
YoGa Awards	Worst Foreign Actor	Dustin Hoffman	Won

== Legacy ==
The release of Rain Man in 1988 coincided with a tenfold increase in funding for medical research and diagnoses of individuals for autism in the US. The latter is primarily due to autism's being more broadly defined in newer editions of the Diagnostic and Statistical Manual of Mental Disorders, particularly versions III-R and IV. The movie is credited, however, with significantly increasing awareness of autism among the general public.

Rain Man is known, in particular, for its portrayal of a man with both autism and savant skills, leading much of its viewing audience to assume the intellectual capabilities of autistic people at large. Characters like Raymond Babbitt, whose characterization has been criticized for adhering to stereotypes, are portrayed as having an otherworldly intellectual ability that, rather than disable them from living a "normal" life, instead assists them in a nearly magical way. Although having savant abilities is certainly a possibility for autistic individuals, the combination is incredibly rare. Conversely, Rain Man has also been seen as dispelling a number of other misconceptions about autism, and improving public awareness of the failure of many agencies to accommodate autistic people and make use of the abilities they do have, regardless of whether they have savant skills or not.

Since Dustin Hoffman's 1989 Academy Award win for his performance in Rain Man, about half of all Best Actor trophies have been awarded for portrayals of characters who are disabled in some way; none of these recipients share their characters' disabilities in real life. Just one year after Hoffman's win, Daniel Day-Lewis (thus far the only actor to have won three awards in the category) garnered his first Best Actor win for his portrayal of cerebral palsy patient Christy Brown in My Left Foot. The Academy's incentivizing of such casting practices has drawn criticism from disabled actors and self-advocates, who argue that these decisions sideline more authentic stories about disabled characters, in favor of leveraging already-established actors' prestige. This pattern has even been satirized by the 2008 film Tropic Thunder (in which Tom Cruise also appears), wherein Robert Downey Jr.'s character, Kirk Lazarus, chastises fellow actor Tugg Speedman (Ben Stiller) for portraying Simple Jack, a character whose developmental disability is deemed too alienating for a mainstream audience.

Rain Man is also known for popularizing the misconception that card counting is illegal in the United States.

In 2006, the film was recognized by the American Film Institute in their list of 100 Years...100 Cheers at #63.

=== Stage play ===
In 2008, a stage adaptation of the film by Dan Gordon premiered at the West End's Apollo Theatre in a production starring Josh Hartnett and Adam Godley.

== In popular culture ==
The cold open sketch of the April 1, 1989 season 14 episode of Saturday Night Live spoofed both the film and the Pete Rose gambling scandal at the time. Charlie and Raymond Babbitt were played by Ben Stiller and Dana Carvey, respectively, with Phil Hartman as Rose.

References to Rain Man, Dustin Hoffman's performance in particular, have become a popular shorthand for autism and savantism. In "Pascal's Triangle Revisited", the final episode of the first season of Community, Pierce Hawthorne (Chevy Chase) calls Abed Nadir (Danny Pudi) "Rain Man" when listing members of the study group; Abed had been described previously as having Asperger Syndrome, which is now diagnosed as autism spectrum disorder.

=== Qantas and airline controversy ===
In June 1989, at least fifteen major airlines showed edited versions of Rain Man that omitted the scene involving Raymond's refusal to fly, mentioning the crashes of American Airlines Flight 625, Delta Air Lines Flight 191 and Continental Airlines Flight 1713, except on Australia-based Qantas. Those criticizing this decision included film director Barry Levinson, co-screenwriter Ronald Bass and George Kirgo (at the time, the president of the Writers Guild of America West). "I think it's a key scene to the entire movie", Levinson said in a telephone interview. "That's why it's in there. It launches their entire odyssey across country – because they couldn't fly." Although some of those airlines cited as justification avoiding having airplane passengers feel uncomfortable in sympathy with Raymond during the in-flight entertainment, the scene was shown intact on flights of Qantas and commentators noted that Raymond mentions it as the only airline whose planes have "never crashed".

The film is credited with introducing Qantas's safety record to U.S. consumers. However, contrary to the claims made in the film, Qantas aircraft have been involved in a number of fatal accidents since the airline's founding in 1920 (although none involving jet aircraft, with the last incident taking place in December 1951).

=== The Buick convertible ===
Two 1949 Buick Roadmaster convertibles were used in the filming, one of which had its rear suspension stiffened to bear the additional load of camera equipment and a cameraman. After filming completed, the unmodified car was acquired by Hoffman, who had it restored and added it to his collection. He kept it for 34 years. Hemmings Motor News reported that the car was auctioned in January 2022 by Bonhams in Scottsdale, Arizona, and sold for $335,000. The camera-carrying car was similarly acquired by Barry Levinson, who had it restored by Wayne Carini of the Chasing Classic Cars television series a few years later.

== See also ==
- List of films set in Las Vegas
- Heart of Dragon (1985)
