= Karl Horstmann =

American filmmaker

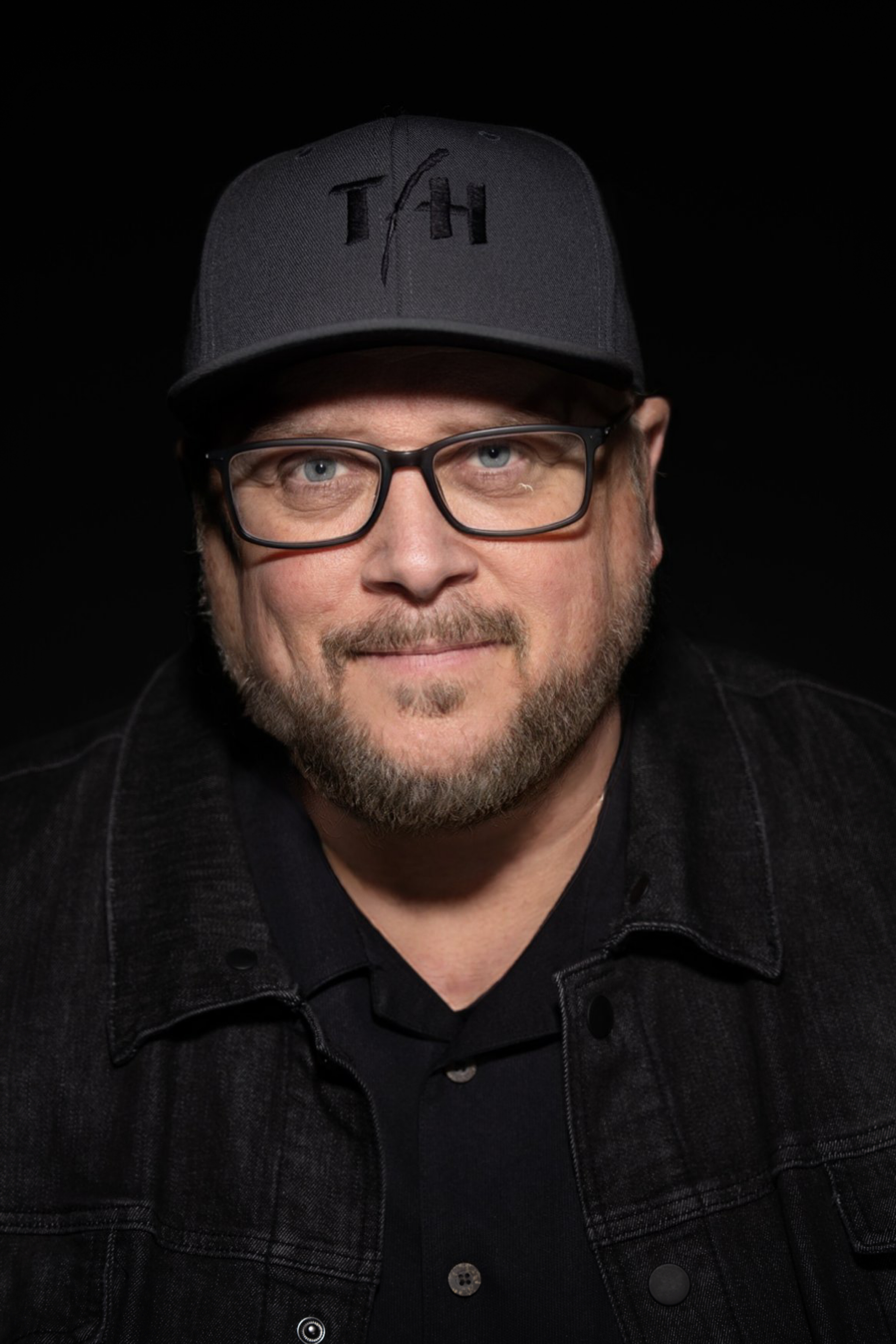
- Horstmann at Triple Horse Studios in 2023
- Born: Jerry Karl Horstmann; 2 March 1967 (age 59); Norfolk, Virginia, USA
- Occupations: Director; Producer; Writer
- Years active: 1985–present

Karl Horstmann (born 2 March 1967) is an American film director, screenwriter and producer. He is best known as the producer of The Case for Christ (2017) and as the director and producer of Fallen Angel: Call Sign – Extortion 17 (2021).

His production company is Triple Horse Studios, based in Atlanta, Georgia.

== Early life ==
Horstmann was born on 2 March 1967 in Norfolk, Virginia and was raised in Portsmouth, Virginia.

== Career ==
Horstmann began his film career in Atlanta, Georgia in the early 1990s, first as an editor and then a director at Turner Broadcasting - working on the team that launched TNT, TCM and the Cartoon Network. In 1996, he produced and directed the feature documentary The Making of Champions with NASCAR CUP team owner, Richard Childress and seven-time-champion, Dale Earnhardt. After completion of the film, Horstmann founded Triple Horse Productions, where he directed and produced hundreds of television commercials and title sequences for Coca-Cola, Under Armour, Home Depot, the NFL, NBA and Major League Baseball.

Later, Horstmann formed Triple Horse Studios to focus his efforts on larger narrative story telling. His first feature film was the small indy Stand Your Ground distributed by eONE. Horstmann's first television outing was a highly rated pair of History Channel prime-time specials exploring the mystery of the lost colony of Roanoke. Notable film credits include The Case for Christ, starring Mike Vogel, Erika Christensen and Faye Dunaway, and the feature documentary, that Horstmann also directed, entitled Fallen Angel: Call Sign Extortion 17 investigating the contradictions surrounding an Army helicopter in Afghanistan that was shot down carrying 17 members of the elite Navy SEAL Team 6, the unit that killed Osama Bin Laden.

Horstmann's 2023 scheduled film releases as Producer include Southern GospeI - a 60's era faith drama, Love, Courage and the Battle of Bushy Run - an action packed story of the decisive battle that ended the Seven Years War in 1763, the southern gothic action picture, The Daylong Brothers starring Keith Carradine, the faith drama On A Wing And A Prayer with Dennis Quaid directed by Sean McNamara, and a family friendly limited series for Sony/Affirm entitled Shadrach - the six episode, coming of age tale of a little girl and her horse also directed by McNamara.

Additionally, Horstmann is the founder of Cine Stables, a motion picture facility and equipment rental company. He is also the founder of Hitching Post Digital, a visual effects and post production services company.

== Filmography ==
=== Feature films ===
Year	Title	Director	Writer	Producer	Notes
2013	Stand Your Ground	No	No	Yes	
2016	High Cotton	No	No	Executive	
2016	Laughing at the Moon	No	No	Yes	
2016	Vanished	No	No	Yes	
2017	The Case For Christ	No	No	Yes	
2017	Sweet Sweet Summertime	No	No	Yes	
2021	The First Noelle	No	No	Yes	
2023	Southern Gospel	No	No	Yes	
2023	On A Wing and A Prayer	No	No	Yes	
TBA	The Daylong Brothers	No	No	Yes	
TBA	The Unbreakable Boy	No	No	Line Producer	Additional Photography
TBA	Love, Courage and the Battle of Bushy Run	No	No	Yes	

=== Documentary films ===
Year	Title	Director	Writer	Producer	Notes
1996	The Making of Champions	Yes	No	Yes	
2015	One Generation Away	No	No	Executive	
2021	Fallen Angel: Call Sign - Extortion 17	Yes	No	Yes	Co-Directed with Stephen Spivey
TBA	Subdivided America	No	No	Yes	

=== Series & TV Specials ===
Year	Title	Director	Writer	Producer	Notes
2006	Songs of Praise for Christmas	Yes	No	Yes	
2007	Songs of Praise for America	Yes	No	Executive	
2015	Roanoke: Search for the Lost Colony	No	No	Executive	
2017	Return to Roanoke: Search for the Seven	No	No	Executive	
2023	Shadrach	No	No	Yes	

=== Short films ===
Year	Title	Director	Writer	Producer	Notes
2002	Cliché	Yes	Yes	Yes	Best Narrative Short Winner; Atlanta Film Festival
2007	Max Lucado 3:16: Stories of Hope	Yes	No	Yes	
2008	Wherever You Are	Yes	Yes	Yes	
2012	Custom Modifications	No	No	Executive	
2013	John Henry and the Railroad	No	No	Yes	
2015	Hold/Fast	No	No	Yes	
2017	The Book	No	No	Yes	
