= The Flintstones: On the Rocks =

2001 television film

- Based on: The Flintstones, by William Hanna and Joseph Barbera
- Written by: Cindy Morrow; Clayton McKenzie Morrow; Chris Savino; David Smith
- Directed by: David Smith; Chris Savino
- Voices of: Jeff Bergman; Tress MacNeille; Kevin Michael Richardson; Grey DeLisle
- Theme music composer: Hoyt Curtin; William Hanna; Joseph Barbera
- Opening theme: "Meet the Flintstones"
- Ending theme: "Rise and Shine"
- Composers: Hoyt Curtin; Joey Altruda (re-arrangements); Skip Heller (additional music); Ego Plum; Gary Lionelli
- Country of origin: United States
- Original language: English

Production
- Executive producers: Mike Lazzo; Linda Simensky (for Cartoon Network)
- Producer: Chris Savino (uncredited)
- Running time: 66 minutes
- Production company: Cartoon Network Studios

Original release
- Network: Cartoon Network
- Release: November 3, 2001

The Flintstones: On the Rocks is a 2001 American animated made-for-television comedy-drama film based on the 1960s Hanna-Barbera series The Flintstones. Directed by David Smith and Chris Savino, the film was intended to emulate the format of the series' first two seasons by featuring humor distinctly more mature and aimed at older audiences than the later seasons, and focuses more on the relationships between the original core cast of Fred Flintstone, Barney Rubble, Wilma Flintstone and Betty Rubble. In the film, the Rubbles are prompted to take Fred and Wilma to Rockapulco for their anniversary vacation, in an attempt to rekindle their troubled marriage. Once there however, Fred and Wilma both find themselves tempted in other directions. In addition to the show's traditional animation style, the film also utilizes stop-motion animation.

Premiering on Cartoon Network on November 3, 2001, The Flintstones: On the Rocks was dedicated to longtime Hanna-Barbera conductor and composter Hoyt Curtin and The Flintstones co-creator and Hanna-Barbera co-founder William Hanna. It is the first and only Flintstones production by Cartoon Network Studios after Hanna-Barbera was absorbed into Warner Bros. Animation on March 12, 2001. Since its original broadcast, The Flintstones: On the Rocks has not been released officially on home video, though bootleg copies exist via various sources as of 2010.

== Plot ==
Fred and Wilma Flintstone visit a family therapist to try to fix their faltering marriage. Wilma is growing tired of Fred's attitude, especially while Barney and Betty Rubble are enjoying a happy life well into their marriage. Their session ends with a physical altercation between the two. On Fred and Wilma's anniversary, which they both forgot, the Rubbles arrange a trip to Rockapulco in an attempt to save the Flintstones' marriage.

Shortly after their arrival, a thief, Xavier, steals a diamond from a jewelry store and is chased by the guard into the same hotel the Flintstones and Rubbles are staying at. In the ensuing chaos, Xavier's bag is switched with Wilma's, and that's when he immediately begins plotting to get the diamond back. At first, things do not improve between Fred and Wilma, to the point that Wilma lashes out at Fred and nearly decides to divorce him, but when she stumbles across the diamond in her suitcase and, assuming that Fred bought it as a surprise present, she quickly makes up with him. Capitalizing on the circumstances, Fred goes along with the charade, but finds that their newfound passion is short-lived, as Fred's demeanor slowly puts Wilma off again. While spying on Wilma, Xavier notices this and masquerades as a suave Englishman in order to seduce Wilma by inviting her to dinner. Wilma accepts the invitation and spends time with Xavier.

Fred, feeling guilty, decides to make it up to Wilma, but catches her from afar with Xavier and is heartbroken, and he starts to drink himself silly while speaking with another woman at the bar. Wilma rebuffs Xavier's advances out of loyalty to Fred, but changes her mind when she sees him with the lady. While dancing, however, Xavier reveals his true intentions and attempts to take the diamond from Wilma, who was wearing it as a necklace. A chase ensues throughout the ballroom with Fred, Barney and Xavier each trying to get the diamond, but fails when it eventually falls into Wilma's hands, prompting Xavier to abduct her and flee in his car. The ensuing car chase eventually leads to a bridge above a volcano, where Xavier threatens to kill Wilma if she does not hand the diamond over. Fred appears and gives a passionate speech about how he has not realized until now that even though he was not rich enough to buy the diamond, he is still the richest man in the world just by having Wilma as his wife.

Fred tries to attack him, but Xavier punches him unconscious. Wilma beats up Xavier in retaliation and ends up getting him arrested by the same lady who Fred spoke with at the bar earlier, who is revealed to have been a policewoman on Xavier's trail. With their marriage restored, Fred and Wilma enjoy the rest of their trip, while Barney and Betty begin to bicker about their own marriage after seeing the passion Fred and Wilma ultimately displayed for each other. During the credits, Dino, who was assigned by Fred to guard their home, is revealed to have made a complete mess and left the home in the hands of his friends before leaving on his own trip.

== Voice cast ==
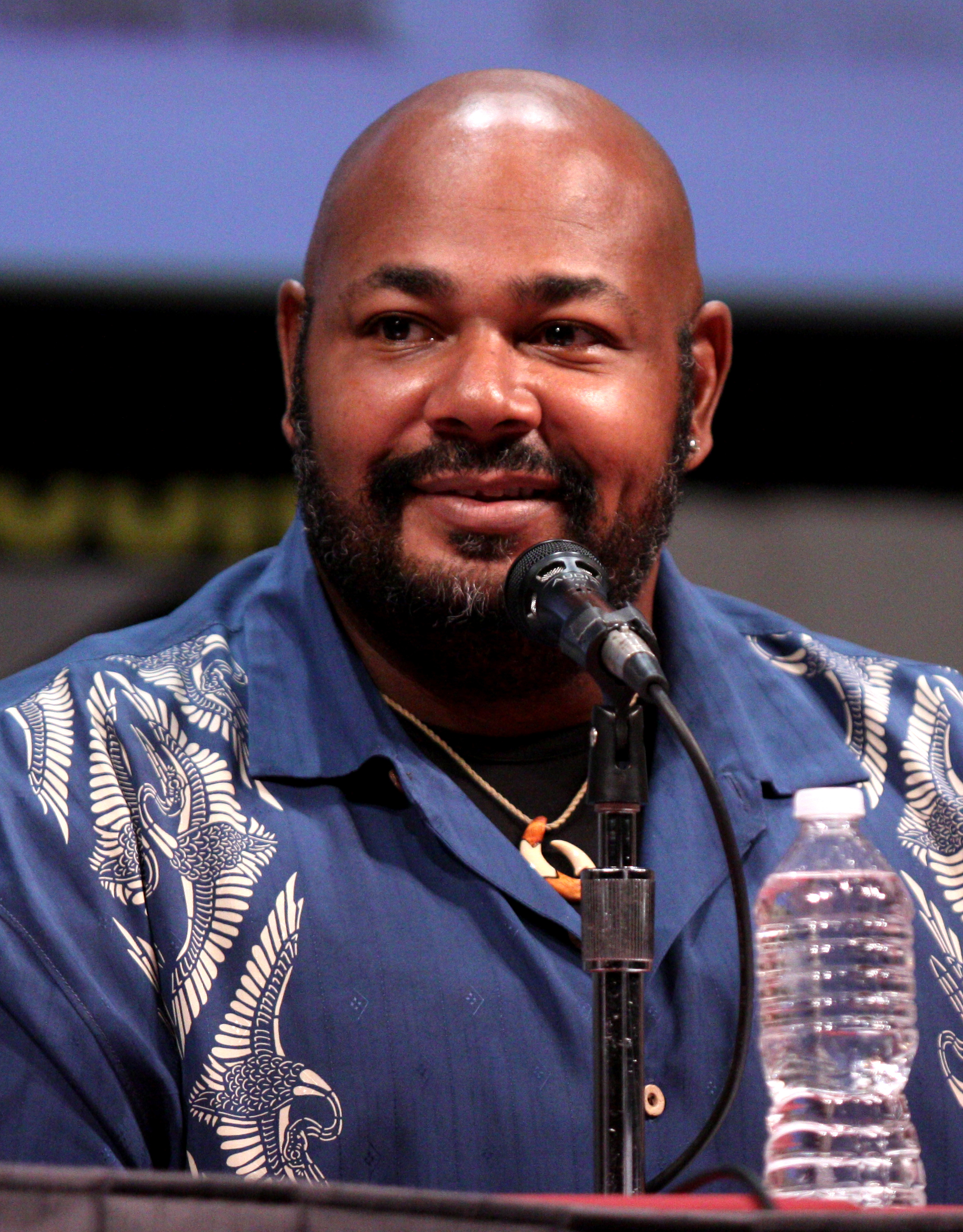
Kevin Michael Richardson voiced Barney Rubble in this film.

- Jeff Bergman as Fred Flintstone, The Parking Guard, and The Vendor
- Tress MacNeille as Wilma Flintstone, and Woman Scream #2
- Kevin Michael Richardson as Barney Rubble, Hector, and The Jewel Guard
- Grey DeLisle as Betty Rubble, and The Mystery Woman
- Jeff Bennett as Xavier the Villain, The Club Announcer, and The Pool Waiter
- Frank Welker as Dino, The Monkey, and The Elevator Guy
- Tom Kenny as The Bellboy, The Woolly Mammoth Vendor, The Bed Monkey, and The Bowling Ball Center Announcer
- Zelda Rubinstein as Dr. Schwartzen Quartz (Psychiatrist)
- Joey Altruda as Stoney Altruda
- John Kassir as Concierge, The Bartender, The Border Guard, and The Florist
- John Stephenson as Mr. Slate, and The Old Man
- Oren Waters as The Singer (Baritone)
- Maxi Anderson as The Singer (Soprano)
- Carmen Twillie as The Singer (Tenor)
- Willie Wheaton as The Singer (Bass)
- Mark Mangini as The Dinosaur (Archived Sound)
