= The Case for Christ =

- Theatrical release poster
- Directed by: Jon Gunn
- Screenplay by: Brian Bird
- Based on: The Case for Christ by Lee Strobel
- Produced by: Elizabeth Hatcher-Travis; Karl Horstmann; Michael Scott; David A. R. White; Alysoun Wolfe; Brittany Yost
- Starring: Mike Vogel; Erika Christensen; Frankie Faison; Faye Dunaway; Robert Forster
- Cinematography: Brian Shanley
- Edited by: Vance Null
- Music by: Will Musser
- Production company: Triple Horse Studios
- Distributed by: Pure Flix Entertainment
- Release date: April 7, 2017
- Running time: 113 minutes
- Country: United States
- Budget: $3 million
- Box office: $17.6 million

The Case for Christ is a 2017 American Christian drama film directed by Jon Gunn and written by Brian Bird, based on a true story and inspired by the 1998 book of the same name by Lee Strobel. The film stars Mike Vogel, Erika Christensen, Faye Dunaway and Robert Forster, and follows an atheist journalist who looks to disprove his wife's Christian faith. The film was released on April 7, 2017, by Pure Flix Entertainment. It received mixed reviews from critics and grossed $17.6 million against a $3 million budget.

== Plot ==
In 1980, Lee Strobel is an atheist journalist and investigative reporter for the Chicago Tribune. He and his wife Leslie have a daughter named Alison and are expecting their second child. After getting a very special recognition, Lee and his family go out for dinner to celebrate, and Alison chokes on a piece of candy. One of the patrons, a nurse named Alfie, intervenes and saves Alison. She credits the event to God's will, which Leslie takes to heart.

Leslie and Alfie become friends and start attending a Christian church together. Irritated, Lee unsuccessfully tries to dissuade Leslie. Due to advice from his mentor, Lee sets out to find evidence that the resurrection of Jesus did not happen. Meanwhile, Leslie gives birth to a son, Kyle.

Lee starts gathering information and evidence. Next, he tries to prove that the witnesses were hypnotized, but a psychologist proves him wrong. Lee then tries to gather evidence that Jesus may have not actually died on the Cross, or was taken off, but again, a physician proves him wrong, saying Jesus had to have died on the Cross.

Meanwhile, Lee's estranged father tries to reconcile with him, but Lee brushes him off. His father dies soon after, and then Lee learns that his father truly loved him, which surprises Lee.

Simultaneously with Lee's pursuit to disprove the resurrection of Jesus, he is also investigating a case of the shooting of a police officer. At first, it looks like the convicted man is guilty and an informant for a gang, but Lee proves that the cop shot himself with a secret gun disguised as a pen, and the convict is freed.

Lee tries to get more evidence for his religious investigation, but his mentor explains that whether he chooses to believe or not believe, the last part of proving Jesus' real existence is faith. When a colleague gives him a speech, Lee decides to take the leap of faith and believe. When he tells Leslie about it, they have a happy reconciliation and pray together.

== Cast ==
- Mike Vogel as Lee Strobel
  - Michael Provost as young Lee Strobel
- Erika Christensen as Leslie Strobel
  - Kelly Lamor Wilson as young Leslie Strobel
- Faye Dunaway as Dr. Roberta Waters
- Robert Forster as Walter Strobel
- Frankie Faison as Joe Dubois
- L. Scott Caldwell as Alfie Davis
- Mike Pniewski as Kenny London
- Tom Nowicki as Dr. Alexander Metherell
- Kevin Sizemore as Dr. Gary Habermas
- Rus Blackwell as Dr. William Lane Craig
- Jordan Cox as Bill Hybels
- Renell Gibbs as James Hicks
- Haley Rosenwasser as Alison Strobel
- Brett Rice as Ray Nelson
- Grant Goodeve as Mr. Cook

== Release ==
In the United States and Canada, The Case for Christ was released on April 7, 2017, alongside Going in Style and Smurfs: The Lost Village, and was projected to gross $5 million in its opening weekend from 1,174 theaters. It ended up debuting to $3.9 million, finishing 10th at the box office. In its second weekend the film grossed $2.8 million, dropping 30.5% and finishing 9th at the box office. It grossed over $17 million on a $3 million budget.

== Critical response ==
According to the review aggregator website Rotten Tomatoes, 63% of critics have given the film a positive review based on 27 reviews. The website's critics consensus reads, "The Case for Christ shouldn't be dismissed, but like many faith-based productions, it's better at preaching to the choir than reaching the unconverted." At Metacritic, the film has a weighted average score of 50 out of 100 based on six critics, indicating "mixed or average reviews". Audiences polled by CinemaScore gave the film a rare average grade of "A+" on an A+ to F scale.

Kevin McLenithan of Christianity Today gave the film a "fresh" rating and wrote, "The film may be only intermittently successful, but when it takes its own story seriously rather than treating it as a means to an end, it stands among the best films yet produced by the Christian film industry." Jackie K. Cooper of The Huffington Post gave the film 6 out of 10 stars and called it "Well made and well acted; the perfect movie for the Easter season." Michael Foust of the Southern Baptist Texan gave it 4 out of 5 stars and acknowledged he was "skeptical that The Case for Christ could be turned into an enjoyable film but was pleasantly surprised with the on-screen product." Foust added, "It is one of the best films I've seen this year, masterfully weaving a spoonful of apologetics into an engaging plot that will leave moviegoers entertained, educated, and perhaps even inspired." In a negative review, Roger Moore of Movie Nation gave it only 1.5 out of 4 stars, calling it "unemotional, uninspiring and unconvincing."

Influx Magazine film critic Steve Pulaski said, "The Case for Christ bears a lot of thematic similarities to its brother in Christ God's Not Dead in the way that it attempts to ignite stirring intellectual debate rather than settling for predictable melodrama. The result is a film with certain appeal, but also certain issues when it comes to its prolific condescension to nonbelievers and skeptics and unnaturally written moments where proselytizing overpowers plot."
