= The Funhouse =

1981 film directed by Tobe Hooper

- Theatrical release poster
- Directed by: Tobe Hooper
- Written by: Larry Block
- Produced by: Steven Bernhardt; Derek Power
- Starring: Elizabeth Berridge; Cooper Huckabee; William Finley; Kevin Conway
- Cinematography: Andrew Laszlo
- Edited by: Jack Hofstra
- Music by: John Beal
- Production company: Mace Neufeld Productions
- Distributed by: Universal Pictures
- Release date: March 13, 1981
- Running time: 96 minutes
- Country: United States
- Language: English
- Budget: $3.7 million
- Box office: $7.9 million

The Funhouse is a 1981 American slasher film directed by Tobe Hooper, written by Larry Block and starring Elizabeth Berridge, Kevin Conway, William Finley, Cooper Huckabee, Miles Chapin, Largo Woodruff, Wayne Doba, and Sylvia Miles. The film's plot follows four Midwestern teenagers who become trapped in a dark ride at a traveling carnival and are stalked by a mentally handicapped albino killer.

A Universal Pictures production, The Funhouse was director Hooper's first major studio film after The Texas Chain Saw Massacre (1974) and Eaten Alive (1976). Its producers were inspired to produce a successful teenage-themed horror film following the major financial success of Paramount's slasher Friday the 13th (1980). Though the film is set in Iowa, principal photography took place on backlots at Norin Studios in Miami, Florida. Hooper was stylistically influenced by Nightmare Alley (1947), a film noir also set in a traveling carnival.

An independent production, The Funhouse was acquired by Universal Pictures, who theatrically released it in the United States on March 13, 1981. Though a commercial disappointment, the film received mixed to positive reviews from critics with praise for its atmosphere, cinematography and Kevin Conway's performance but criticisms for its pacing and comparisons to Tobe Hooper's other works. Some critics favorably cited its references to several classic horror films, among them works by Alfred Hitchcock, James Whale, and Tod Browning. (Note: Attributed to multiple sources.) Contemporary film scholars and critics have noted that the film continues Hooper's recurring theme of family dysfunction as seen in his previous films.

A novelization of the film by Dean Koontz was released prior to its release, with Koontz using the pseudonym Owen West.

== Plot ==
In small-town Iowa, a masked intruder attacks teenager Amy as she showers. The attacker turns out to be her younger brother Joey, a horror film fan, and his weapon is a fake rubber prop knife.

Against her father's wishes, Amy visits a sleazy traveling carnival with her new boyfriend Buzz, her best friend Liz, and Liz's irresponsible boyfriend Richie; in the meantime, Joey sneaks out from the house and goes on a walk, where he encounters a man in a car that points a hunting rifle at him only to drive off. At the carnival, the four teens smoke marijuana, peep into a 21-and-over strip show, heckle fortune teller Madame Zena, visit the freaks-of-nature exhibit, and view a magic show.

Richie dares the group to spend the night in "The Funhouse," which is a dark ride. After the carnival closes, the teenagers settle down inside the funhouse. Through a grate to a room below the attraction, the teenagers witness the ride assistant, a silent man in a Frankenstein's Monster mask, engaging Zena as a prostitute. He experiences premature ejaculation, but despite his request, Zena will not return her $100 fee; he then murders her in a violent rage.

The teenagers try to leave but find themselves locked inside the funhouse. As they attempt to escape, Richie secretly steals the money from the safe from which the masked assistant took Zena's fee. The funhouse's barker, Conrad Straker, discovers what his son Gunther Twibunt (the masked assistant) has done to Zena. Conrad also realizes that the money is missing. Thinking Gunther took it, he attacks him. Gunther's face is revealed to be gruesomely deformed via albinism and frontonasal dysplasia with sharp protruding teeth, long white thinning hair, red eyes, and a cleft running up the bridge of his nose.

The teens see this, and Conrad realizes someone is watching when Richie's lighter falls from the ceiling where he and the others were hiding onto the floor. Buzz concludes that Richie has the money. Richie insists that he would have split the money with the others. Despite Liz wanting to return the money, Buzz knows it is too late since they are now in danger. Conrad stalks the funhouse to eliminate any witnesses and heckles Gunther into a murderous rage. The teens arm themselves with the various funhouse props as weapons. Joey, who had been around the carnival for some time, encounters the carnies while looking around and ends up having his parents called up on him after being discovered.

Richie is hanged with a rope by Conrad, and the remaining three witness his corpse being carried through on a cart. Liz, hysterical, falls through a trapdoor and is confronted by Gunther. She stabs him with a dagger before he kills her by pushing her head through an industrial exhaust fan. Buzz stabs Conrad to death when he confronts him and Amy, but is then killed by Gunther. During a showdown between Amy and Gunther in the funhouse's maintenance area, Gunther is electrocuted and crushed to death between two spinning gears.

As dawn breaks, the traumatized sole survivor Amy emerges from the funhouse and heads home as the animatronic fat lady perched atop the entrance laughs mockingly at her.

== Cast ==
- Elizabeth Berridge as Amy Harper
- Cooper Huckabee as Buzz
- Largo Woodruff as Liz Duncan
- Miles Chapin as Richie
- Kevin Conway as Freak Show Barker / Strip Show Barker / Conrad Straker, The Funhouse Barker
- Wayne Doba as Gunther Twibunt, The Monster
- Sylvia Miles as Madame Zena
- William Finley as Marco The Magnificent
- Shawn Carson as Joey Harper
- Rebuka Hoye as Strip Show Dancer
- Jack McDermott as Mr. Paul Harper
- Jeanne Austin as Mrs. Ellen Harper

== Themes ==
In his 1997 book Hearths of Darkness, author Tony Williams argues that The Funhouse "continues [Hooper's] exploration of the American family's repressive nature", a theme previously explored in The Texas Chain Saw Massacre (1974). Williams further posits that the "carnival world" which Amy enters acts as a liberating, unrepressed counter to the restricted nature of her home life with her family. The theme of family was similarly noted by critic Cynthia Rose of The Monthly Film Bulletin, who wrote of the film during its 1981 release: "Again as in [The Texas] Chain Saw [Massacre], the film’s real focus is on the family and, through it, on the 'permissive' society. Over and over, we see how the 'monstrous' (and once more all-male) family—the source of the evil—is sustained and regenerated by exterminating (in Chain Saw, actually devouring) the threat of the outsider."

The Funhouse contains metafiction elements, including in its opening scene, which explicitly parodies the opening sequence of the 1978 slasher film Halloween, as well as the shower scene in Psycho (1960). Hooper said that the opening scene "immediately [lets] you know you're watching a genre picture. In particular, too, it helped make the film a little safe. And I wanted that. Because I wanted the color and the fantasy, to build up to the moment where this person [who] is wearing a Frankenstein mask is actually the strange anomaly".

In the 2021 book American Twilight: The Cinema of Tobe Hooper, writers Kristopher Woofter and Will Dodson note a recurring theme throughout The Funhouse of a world in which adults mistreat and look down upon teenagers, characterizing them as "a corrupt cabal disenfranchising the young."

== Production ==
=== Development ===
The Funhouse was written by Larry Block, and the script was optioned by BNB Productions who got a negative pickup deal with Universal Studios who were looking to produce a teen-aimed horror film after the success of Paramount's Friday the 13th (1980). Tobe Hooper, who had recently completed the miniseries Salem's Lot (1979) for Warner Bros., was offered to direct The Funhouse. Hooper agreed to sign on as director as he saw "a lot of potential" in its carnival setting; Hooper was an admirer of Nightmare Alley (1947), a film noir set in a carnival, and had always wanted to make a film of his own set in the same locale.

In 2017, screenwriter Lawrence J. Block recaptured the U.S. copyright to The Funhouse through the termination provisions of U.S. copyright law."Copyright Record – The Funhouse". United States Copyright Office.

=== Casting ===
Elizabeth Berridge, who was cast in the lead role of Amy Harper, is given an "introducing" credit, though she had previously appeared in the film Natural Enemies (1979). Largo Woodruff was cast in the role of Amy's best friend, Liz, after auditioning and screen testing for the part with Hooper in New York City.

Commenting to Roger Ebert at the time, Sylvia Miles said of her casting: "[It]'s fabulous, I’m playing a fortuneteller. Madame Zena. I have a phony accent and a great scene where I lose the accent gradually as I’m being murdered in the fun house. Of course, there are people who have asked why I want to be in a horror picture. You know what I always say: Better a horror film than a horrible film. Besides, the people who see them, I think they remember the horror films better than the others."

=== Filming ===
Though set in the American Midwest in Iowa, The Funhouse was shot on the backlots of the Ivan Tors Studios in Miami, Florida, over approximately ten weeks. Principal photography began in March 1980, on a budget of $3.7 million. The film was independently financed. The production originally intended to shoot the film on the Universal Studios lots, but opted instead to film on the east coast, as they were unable to obtain a waiver in the state of California allowing for child actor Shawn Carson—who played a significant role in the film—to work overnight due to child labor laws. Filming in Florida also allowed Hooper and the production to hire real carnies to appear in the film, as many traveling carnival workers settle in the state during the winter season when principal photography occurred. Filming was completed by May 1980.

The amusement rides and attractions featured in the film, which date from the 1940s and 1950s, were acquired from a defunct carnival in Akron, Ohio. The "freakshow" animals seen in the film—including one cow with a cleft palate and another with two heads—were real animals that belonged to a traveling carnival. Production designer Mort Rabinowitz designed the carnival set pieces based on his own recollections of visiting carnivals as a child: "I picked most of these concepts out of my memory—and old MGM carnival research stills." Rabinowitz said he took the job because it was "a set designer's dream project."

=== Special effects ===
The deformed facial appearance of the Monster—who was dubbed "cow-man" by Hooper and other members of the crew—was designed by makeup artist Rick Baker and executed by makeup artist Craig Reardon. The film's screenplay described the Monster's appearance as a hulking troll-like creature with large red animal eyes. Baker took some creative freedom during the design process. In an interview with Fangoria, Baker said:

It's a birth-defect type monster. After I started thinking about it for a while, I felt real guilty about making that deformity a monster. It's so easy to take horror straight from nature, because there are some pretty horrifying real things. I just didn't feel right about making it a straight freak, so I added a little more to it. I hope it comes across that way, because it still has a lot of the birth defect aspect to it.

Twibunt's hands were designed by Reardon. The character was portrayed by Wayne Doba, a mime from the San Francisco area.

Additionally, Reardon designed Twibunt's brother, a preserved infant exhibiting similar facial deformities seen on display at the carnival in the film. A vinyl cast of a baby from a medical supply house was used as a base for the prop.

== Music ==
The orchestral musical score for The Funhouse was composed by John Beal. In 1998, Beal's score was released on compact disc, which became a collector's item. In 2023, the score was given a limited edition vinyl release by Waxwork Records.

== Release ==
=== Theatrical run ===
Distribution rights for The Funhouse were acquired by Universal Pictures shortly before filming completed in mid-1980. Universal released the film in 814 theaters in the United States on March 13, 1981. It was released in some locations with the subtitle Carnival of Terror. (Note: John Kenneth Muir notes that the film was sometimes known as Carnival of Terror. During its theatrical release in the Tampa, Florida area, the film was billed with Carnival of Terror as a subtitle.)

=== Television broadcast ===
Following its theatrical release, an alternate cut of the film was aired on network television which featured additional footage to supplant the scenes of violence and nudity that had to be excised, as well as to pad the running time. This footage was released as a standalone bonus feature on the Blu-ray disc released by Scream Factory.

=== Home media ===
The film was unsuccessfully prosecuted as a video nasty in the United Kingdom a few years after its release; the BBFC had previously passed the film for cinema exhibition with an X certificate. Some commentators have questioned its attempted banning, given that the film is fairly tame in comparison to other entries on the list, leading some to suggest it was mistakenly chosen instead of the infamous Last House on Dead End Street, which was released under an alternative title The Fun House and did not appear on the list. In 1987, the BBFC passed the film for home media release with an 18 certificate, which was downgraded to a 15 certificate in 2007. The film received a special edition Blu-ray disc in the United Kingdom on July 18, 2011, by Arrow Video.

In the United States, GoodTimes Entertainment released The Funhouse on VHS and DVD in 1998 and 1999, respectively. Universal Pictures Home Entertainment released a DVD edition in 2004.

In October 2012, Shout! Factory released the film on Blu-ray and DVD in a special collector's edition under their horror sub-label, Scream Factory. A 4K Ultra HD Blu-ray edition featuring newly conducted interviews with cast and crew members was released by Scream Factory on September 12, 2022.

In Japan, a special two-disc Blu-ray edition, marketed as The Funhouse: Final Version, was released in 2017. It included the Japanese dub that was originally broadcast by Yomiuri TV in 1988, as well as audio commentary by Tobe Hooper, moderated by Tim Sullivan, a separate Japanese commentary by filmmakers Yudai Yamaguchi and Noboru Iguchi, interviews with Kevin Conway, Mark L. Lester and composer John Beal, and a 32-page booklet and collector's box.

In Italy, Midnight Factory released a three-disc Blu-ray collector's edition in 2018 that included commentary by Hooper, interviews with Kevin Conway and other contributors, and alternate television scenes. In Germany, Koch Media released a three-disc mediabook in 2018 containing one Blu-ray and two DVDs. The release included German and English audio, commentaries, interviews with Tobe Hooper and other contributors, deleted scenes and trailers.

In France, Elephant Films released a limited-edition Blu-ray/DVD Steelcase in 2026 which included the original French theatrical version, an uncut version and six deleted scenes, an introduction by film critic Stéphane Du Mesnildot, a trailer and a photo gallery.

The film has also been made available for streaming on various platforms, including the horror streaming service Shudder in 2022.

== Reception ==
=== Box office ===
The Funhouse earned $2,765,456 in the United States during its opening weekend and went on to gross $7,886,857 in total. Though it earned a profit, the film was a commercial disappointment. In his book Going to Pieces: The Rise and Fall of the Slasher Film, Adam Rockoff posits that the film's combining of elements from slasher films and monster movies "never struck a chord with audiences" at the time of its release.

=== Critical response ===
On the review aggregator website Rotten Tomatoes, 68% of 22 critics' reviews are positive. Metacritic, which uses a weighted average, assigned the film a score of 56 out of 100, based on 7 critics, indicating "mixed or average" reviews. Tobe Hooper was specifically praised for bringing style and suspense to what could have been a standard early-1980s blood and gore-focused horror film, and his work here was largely responsible for him getting the job of directing the original Poltergeist movie.

John Corry of The New York Times gave the film a middling review, noting: "At times, in fact, Mr. Hooper almost persuades us that he is up to more than just gore, creepiness and trauma. He has photographed a carnival - freak show, girly show, grifters and geeks -with a sense of style. The carnival is a small vision of middle-America gone sour, reveling in mean gaiety, and it is not bad while it lasts. Then the monster comes in and drools." Variety's review of the film was similarly mixed: "For all the elegance of photography, [the] pic has nothing in particular up its sleeves, and devotees of director Tobe Hooper’s The Texas Chain Saw Massacre will be particularly disappointed with the almost total lack of shocks and mayhem."

Film critic Gene Siskel of the Chicago Tribune liked the film and gave it a positive review. He also cited it as one of his "guilty pleasures" in a 1987 Siskel & Ebert At the Movies special, giving the film credit for having an interesting story, creative direction, and even a somewhat sympathetic villain. In a review published in People, the film was praised: "While the director, Tobe (The Texas Chainsaw Massacre) Hooper, ought to have moved on to better things, he is the master of this gore-and-sadism genre... The film features an excruciatingly tense final confrontation. Alex Keneas of Newsday also gave the film a positive review: "The Funhouse doesn't trade on gratuitous and graphic gore, but it doesn't have to. In little ways and using the traditional tried and true devices of the genre ... it skillfully heightens expectations [and] nicely evokes the chiller of a bygone era as it pays respect to Hitchcock and James Whale." Ted Mahar of The Oregonian heralded the film as a "superior gory horror movie... Hooper maintains the fever pitch of tension and growing terror with rare skill." He also praised its references to classic horror films such as Frankenstein (1931) and Freaks (1932).

William Whitaker of the Abilene Reporter-News commended the film's performances, cinematography, musical score, screenplay, and pacing, summarizing it as a "stylish" horror film.

=== Modern appraisal ===
Writer John Kenneth Muir characterizes The Funhouse as an example of a self-reflexive horror film "before such things were popular with audiences" and cites it as a "masterpiece" of self-reflexive horror films: "The Funhouse... knowingly and cleverly dances on two levels of meaning. On its basic "surface" level, The Funhouse is a dead teenager movie like Halloween (1978), Scream (1996), and I Know What You Did Last Summer (1997). On a deeper and more meaningful thematic level, however, this is a film about horror films in general and in particular about the glut of "dead teenagers" inhabiting American cinemas in the early eighties."

Writing for the British Film Institute's Sight and Sound in 2017, Nick Pinkerton described The Funhouse as "one of [Hooper's] very finest films", highlighting its self-conscious use of horror conventions.

In his 2022 book Cinema Speculation, filmmaker Quentin Tarantino wrote that a rewatch of The Funhouse led him to reassess the film, praising its cinematography, direction, atmosphere, and characterizations. He described Lawrence J. Block's screenplay as "the big surprise," writing that what initially appeared "simple and obvious" ultimately revealed "both a level of depth and even sophistication" that "forced me to reconsider the whole film."

== Novelization ==
A novelization of the screenplay was written by Dean Koontz, under the pseudonym Owen West. As the film production took longer than expected, the book was released before the film. The novel contains a great deal of backstory and characterization which was not used in the film, including a Satanic subplot and several religious themes culled from Koontz's own Catholic background.

== Sources ==
- Cutler-Broyles, Teresa, ed. (2020). The Big Top on the Big Screen: Explorations of the Circus in Film. Jefferson, North Carolina: McFarland & Company. ISBN 978-1-476-67118-5.
- Gregory, David (2007). Stuck in The Funhouse (Documentary short). Severin Films. Archived from the original on October 7, 2024.
- Martin, John Wiley (2007). Seduction of the Gullible: The Truth Behind the Video Nasty Scandal. Liskeard, England: Straycat Publishing. ISBN 978-0-953-32618-1.
- Martin, Robert (February 1981). "Tobe Hooper's The Funhouse". Fangoria. Vol. 2, no. 11. Starlog Group, Inc. ISSN 0164-2111. Archived from the original on November 7, 2023.
- Muir, John Kenneth (2012). Horror Films of the 1980s. Vol. 1. Jefferson, North Carolina: McFarland & Company. ISBN 978-0-786-47298-7.
- Muir, John Kenneth (2015). Eaten Alive At A Chainsaw Massacre: The Films of Tobe Hooper (Revised ed.). Jefferson, North Carolina: McFarland & Company. ISBN 978-1-476-61335-2.
- Nowell, Richard (December 23, 2010). Blood Money: A History of the First Teen Slasher Film Cycle. Bloomsbury Publishing. ISBN 978-1-441-12496-8.
- Roche, David (2022). Meta in Film and Television Series. Edinburgh, Scotland: Edinburgh University Press. ISBN 978-1-399-50803-2.
- Rockoff, Adam (2002). Going to Pieces: The Rise and Fall of the Slasher Film. Jefferson, North Carolina: McFarland & Company. ISBN 978-0-786-41227-3.
- Williams, Jessica L. (2017). Media, Performative Identity, and the New American Freak Show. New York City, New York: Palgrave Macmillan. ISBN 978-3-319-66461-3.
- Williams, Tony (1996). Hearths of Darkness: The Family in the American Horror Film. Fairleigh Dickinson University Press. ISBN 978-0-838-63564-3.
- Woofter, Kristopher; Dodson, Will, eds. (2021). American Twilight: The Cinema of Tobe Hooper. Austin, Texas: University of Texas Press. ISBN 978-1-477-32283-3.
