= Doug White (aviator) =

American aviator and pharmacist

Doug White (c. 1953) is an American aviator and pharmacist. In 2009, he became known for successfully landing a plane-where he and his wife and children were passengers-right after its pilot, Joe Cabuk, died. His story served as the basis for the 2023 film On a Wing and a Prayer, where White was portrayed by Dennis Quaid.

White received his pilot's license in 1990, but had no experience flying a King Air at the time in 2009. He is married to Terri and they have two daughters, Maggie and Bailey. He is from Archibald, Louisiana. As of 2023, he resides in DeRidder, Louisiana and is the owner of a car wash.
