= Chasing Zero: Winning the War on Healthcare Harm =

2010 American television documentary

- Zero is the number. Now is the time.
- Genre: Documentary
- Written by: Charles (Chuck) Denham
- Directed by: Charles (Chuck) Denham
- Country of origin: United States
- Original language: English

Production
- Executive producer: Charles (Chuck) Denham
- Producers: Matthew Listiak, Elizabeth Gay Muzio, Collin Gabriel, Jonathan Lawhead
- Running time: 53 minutes
- Production companies: TMIT, Summer Productions

Original release
- Network: Discovery Channel
- Release: April 22, 2010

Chasing Zero: Winning the War on Healthcare Harm is a made for television documentary about preventable medical errors in healthcare narrated by and featuring actor and patient safety advocate Dennis Quaid. The world premier was in Nice, France on April 22, 2010, It aired on the Discovery Channel in the U.S. and Western Europe on April 24, 2010, with repeated broadcasts through May 2010. It has been provided free to hospitals and caregivers both as a DVD and by streaming video.

== Content ==
Actor Dennis Quaid, the narrator of the film, shares the story of how his 12-day-old twins both almost died from multiple overdoses of heparin, a blood thinning medication. This led Quaid to become a patient safety advocate, author of medical papers, and teaming up with the producers of Chasing Zero to create the documentary. The film profiles families affected by medical errors, and champions efforts by medical professionals and patients alike who are working to reduce preventable deaths to zero.

The film interviews healthcare leaders from Mayo Clinic, Brigham and Women's Hospital, Johns Hopkins Hospital, Harvard University, and the Institute of Medicine, presenting their reactions to stories from patients and professional caregivers who have been involved in medical errors.

== Educational Use ==
Chasing Zero was available for free Continuing Medical Education credit through the Accreditation Counsel for Continuing Medical Education in partnership with the Discovery Channel and The University of Virginia School of Medicine and Public Health.

In October 2014, the United States Army used the book as a teaching tool . It is also used at the Minnesota Alliance for Patient Safety and the Frances Payne Bolton School of Nursing at Case Western Reserve University. It has also been used on TED-Ed courses.

== Awards ==
- 2011 Winner Bronze in Film and Video, 32nd Annual Telly Awards
- 2011 Winner Silver International Academy of the Visual Arts Communicator Awards
