= Harry Goz =

American actor

- Born: February 16, 1932; St. Louis, Missouri, U.S
- Died: September 6, 2003 (aged 71); Manhasset, New York, U.S.
- Occupation: Actor
- Years active: 1956–2003
- Spouse: Margaret Goz
- Children: 3

Harry Goz (February 16, 1932 – September 6, 2003) was an American musical theatre and voice actor.

== Career ==
Goz debuted in the 1964 Broadway production of Bajour, co-starring Chita Rivera and Nancy Dussault. Goz played Tevye in the Broadway musical Fiddler on the Roof from 1966 to 1968, both as understudy and lead actor. He appeared in musicals such as Two by Two and Chess, for which he was nominated in 1988 for a Drama Desk Award in the Outstanding Featured Actor in a Musical category, and comedies such as The Prisoner of Second Avenue.

Goz had a number of TV and movie guest appearances throughout his career. He starred as The Big Apple in Fruit of the Loom underwear TV commercials during the 1970s and 80s. He also appeared in memorable commercial for Sucrets in 1977 which ran for many years. Goz portrayed Dr. Tom Walz in Bill, a 1981 television film. The same year, Goz portrayed Pepsi-Cola chairman and Joan Crawford's last husband, Alfred Steele, in the film adaptation of Christina Crawford's book Mommie Dearest. In his later years, Goz became known to a new audience with his role as the voice of Captain Hazel "Hank" Murphy in the Cartoon Network/Adult Swim series Sealab 2021.

== Death ==
Goz died from multiple myeloma at the age of 71 on September 6, 2003.

Goz was survived by his wife, three children and ten grandchildren. His son, Michael Goz, took over as a new character on Sealab 2021 following his father's death. Michael died after an 8-year battle with cerebellar degeneration and ataxia on November 11, 2014, aged 55.

== Filmography ==
Year	Title	Role	Notes
1976	Marathon Man	Jewelry Salesman #1	
1977	Looking Up	Sylevine	
1981	Mommie Dearest	Alfred Steele	
1981	Bill	Dr. Tom Walz	
1983	Bill: On His Own	Dr. Tom Walz	
1985	Tales from the Darkside	Louie Farnum	"If the Shoes Fit..."
1985	Rappin'	Thorndike	
1987	Dead Aim	Androsov	
1995	Die Schelme von Schelm	Gronam Ox	Voice
1998	Buster & Chauncey's Silent Night	Mayor Huffenmeier	Voice; Direct-to-Video
2000–2003	Sealab 2021	Captain Hazel "Hank" Murphy	Voice
