= On a Wing and a Prayer (film) =

2023 film by Sean McNamara

- Official release poster
- Directed by: Sean McNamara
- Written by: Brian Egeston
- Produced by: Roma Downey; Autumn Bailey-Ford; Karl Horstmann
- Starring: Dennis Quaid; Heather Graham; Jesse Metcalfe
- Cinematography: Christian Sebaldt
- Edited by: Jeff Canavan
- Music by: Brandon Roberts
- Production companies: LightWorkers Media; Metro-Goldwyn-Mayer Pictures
- Distributed by: Amazon Studios
- Release date: April 7, 2023 (Prime Video)
- Running time: 102 minutes
- Country: United States
- Language: English

On a Wing and a Prayer is a 2023 American biographical survival film directed by Sean McNamara and starring Dennis Quaid, Heather Graham, and Jesse Metcalfe. It was released on April 7, 2023.

== Plot ==
On Easter Sunday 2009, Doug White, a 56-year-old pharmacist, his wife, and their two daughters return to Archibald, Louisiana, after attending a funeral for White's brother. Less than 10 minutes after their King Air 200 private plane (registered N559DW but mainly using the abbreviated callsign "niner delta whisky") takes off from Marco Island, Florida, the pilot dies of a heart attack. Fort Myers air traffic controllers and a flight instructor from Danbury, Connecticut, manage to teach Doug how to fly the plane and land it while the family, who attend a Church of Christ, pray for a miracle.

== Cast ==
- Dennis Quaid as Doug White
- Heather Graham as Terri White
- Jesse Metcalfe as Kari Sorenson
- Abigail Rhyne as Bailey White
- Jessi Case as Maggie White
- Brett Rice as Jeff White
- Rocky Myers as Dan Favio
- Selena Anduze as Lisa Grimm
- E. Roger Mitchell as Brian Norton
- Joe Knezevich as Ralph
- Brandon Quinn as Ellis Ross
- Roger Anthony as Bill Jones
- Raina Grey as Donna
- Trayce Malachi as "Buggy"
- Anna Enger Ritch as Ashley Harrison
- Wilbur Fitzgerald as Joe Cabuk
- Holly A. Morris as Claire
- Rachael Markarian as Linda
- James Healy Jr. as Pastor Williams

== Production ==
On January 27, 2021, it was reported that Dennis Quaid would star in the faith-based family drama, his third time working with director Sean McNamara, with the screenplay written by Brian Egeston. On September 16, 2021, it was reported that Heather Graham would co-star, and that filming would begin that fall. On October 12, 2021, it was reported that Jesse Metcalfe had joined the cast.

The film is based on the 2009 true story of Doug White, a passenger who was forced to land the King Air 200 plane on which he was traveling with his wife and daughters, after the pilot unexpectedly died mid-flight with no co-pilot on board.

== Release ==
The film was originally going to be released theatrically on August 31, 2022 by United Artists Releasing, before ultimately being released on Prime Video on April 7, 2023.

== Reception ==
On the review aggregator website Rotten Tomatoes, 16% of 25 critics' reviews are positive, with an average rating of 3.3/10. The website's consensus reads: "Predictable and unsubtle, On a Wing and a Prayer proves a decidedly disappointing attempt to dramatize an uplifting fact-based story." Metacritic, which uses a weighted average, assigned the film a score of 19 out of 100, based on 5 critics, indicating "overwhelming dislike".

== Awards ==
For his performance, Dennis Quaid was awarded the Grace Award for the Movies Category at the 2024 MovieGuide Awards.
