= Bill (1981 film) =

1981 film directed by Anthony Page

- Genre: Biography; Drama
- Written by: Corey Blechman
- Story by: Barry Morrow
- Directed by: Anthony Page
- Starring: Mickey Rooney; Dennis Quaid; Largo Woodruff; Anna Maria Horsford; Harry Goz
- Theme music composer: William Kraft
- Country of origin: United States
- Original language: English

Production
- Executive producers: Alan Landsburg; Bernard Sofronski
- Producer: Mel Stuart
- Production locations: New York City; Yonkers, New York; College of Mount Saint Vincent
- Cinematography: Mike Fash
- Editor: George Hively
- Running time: 100 minutes
- Production company: Alan Landsburg Productions

Original release
- Network: CBS
- Release: December 22, 1981

Bill is a 1981 American made-for-television biographical drama film starring Mickey Rooney and Dennis Quaid based on the life of Bill Sackter, who lived in a mental hospital for 44 years after being erroneously diagnosed as severely mentally handicapped as a child. The film was broadcast on CBS on December 22, 1981. A sequel, Bill: On His Own, was released in 1983. Writer/filmmaker Barry Morrow, portrayed in Bill by Dennis Quaid, based the story on his own experiences in becoming Sackter’s legal guardian. Sackter would also serve as a partial inspiration for the character of Raymond Babbitt in Morrow's early draft screenplay for the 1988 film Rain Man.

== Plot ==
Bill is a man with an intellectual disability in his 60s. He ventures out into the world for the first time after spending most of his life at Grandville, a dreary inner city institution in Minneapolis, Minnesota, since age seven (when his mother sent him there). Bill is taken in by a kind family and learns what it means to love for the first time in his life.

== Cast ==
- Mickey Rooney - Bill Sackter
- Dennis Quaid - Barry Morrow
- Largo Woodruff - Beverly Morrow
- Anna Maria Horsford - Marge Keating
- Harry Goz - Dr. Tom Walz
- Kathleen Maguire - Florence Archer

== Awards ==
Mickey Rooney won an Emmy Award and Golden Globe for his performance, and the film also received a Golden Globe for Best TV Film.

== See also ==
- Film within a film
- Rain Man
