= Bill: On His Own =

- Genre: Biography; Drama
- Written by: Barry Morrow
- Directed by: Anthony Page
- Starring: Mickey Rooney; Helen Hunt; Dennis Quaid; Largo Woodruff; Edie McClurg; Tracey Walter; Teresa Wright
- Theme music composer: Lee Curreri
- Country of origin: United States
- Original language: English

Production
- Executive producer: Alan Landsburg
- Producer: Linda Otto
- Production locations: Houston; San Antonio
- Cinematography: Mike Fash
- Editors: Corky Ehlers; John C. Horger
- Running time: 100 minutes
- Production company: Alan Landsburg Productions

Original release
- Network: CBS
- Release: November 9, 1983

Bill: On His Own is a 1983 American made-for-television biographical drama film and a sequel to Bill (1981) starring Mickey Rooney as Bill Sackter.

== Plot ==
Bill Sackter struggles to cope after his best friend and guardian Barry Morrow and his wife Beverly move away. Bill moves into a group home run by Mae Driscoll, who teaches him how to read. Bill soon discovers his religious heritage, overcomes the fire that accidentally destroyed his small canteen business, then travels to California to search for the Morrows.

== Cast ==
- Mickey Rooney - Bill Sackter
- Helen Hunt - Jenny Wells
- Dennis Quaid - Barry Morrow
- Largo Woodruff - Beverly Morrow
- Edie McClurg - Angela
- Tracey Walter - Kenny
- Teresa Wright - Mae Driscoll
- Paul Lieber - Rabbi Portman
- Harry Goz - Tom Walz
