= Bill Sackter =

American disability advocate (1913–1983)

William Sackter
- Born: April 13, 1913; St. Paul, Minnesota, US
- Died: June 16, 1983 (aged 70); Iowa City, Iowa, US
- Resting place: Agudas Achim Cemetery
- Education: University of Iowa
- Occupations: Handyman; Developmental Disabilities Consultant; Inspirational Advocate for People with Disabilities
- Years active: 1960s-1983
- Employer: Wild Bill's Coffeeshop
- Parent(s): Sam Sackter; Mary Sackter

William Sackter (April 13, 1913 – June 16, 1983) was an American man with an intellectual disability whose fame as the subject of two television movies and a feature-length documentary helped change national attitudes on persons with disabilities.

== Profile ==
=== Early life ===
Bill Sackter was born in Saint Paul, Minnesota, in 1913, the son of Sam and Mary Sackter, Russian Jewish immigrants who ran a grocery store. When Sackter was 7 years old, his father died from complications of the Spanish Flu. Bill was having difficulty learning in school, and after taking a mandatory intelligence test, he was classified as "subnormal". The State of Minnesota determined that he would be a "burden on society" so he was placed in the Faribault State School for the Feeble-Minded and Epileptic. Sackter remained there for 44 years, never again seeing his mother or two older sisters, Sarah and Alice. He was diagnosed as intellectually disabled, although diagnoses performed decades later would prove his intelligence was near normal. He was never taught to read or write or even how to use a telephone.

=== Later life ===
In 1964, when new light was being shed on the treatment of the mentally ill and disabled, Sackter was moved to a halfway house and worked odd jobs to support himself. He eventually became a handyman at the Minikahda Club, where filmmaker Barry Morrow and his wife, Bev, befriended him. Morrow began slowly to make life a bit more comfortable for Bill, getting him new dentures and becoming his friend. Morrow became his guardian, and when he took a post at the University of Iowa, Sackter followed him to Iowa City, and became the sole proprietor of Wild Bill's Coffee Shop on the campus, in which he excelled.

=== Recognition ===
Sackter was named Handicapped Iowan of the Year in 1976, attending a ceremony in Washington, D.C. President Jimmy Carter gave him special recognition in 1979.

== Movie depictions ==
Sackter's story was related in a television movie entitled Bill, first broadcast in December 1981. This starred Mickey Rooney in the title role. Rooney won a Golden Globe Award and an Emmy Award. The movie also won an Emmy as Outstanding Drama Special. A sequel Bill: On His Own, with Helen Hunt, was released in 1983.

Raymond Babbitt, the fictional autistic savant featured in Rain Man, was initially based, in part, on Sackter. Morrow, having met savant Kim Peek, who had a unique neurological condition, conceived of a character based on Peek and Sackter. Reworkings of the script defined Babbitt as an autistic savant.

== Biographical works ==
Sackter's story is told in the 1999 book The Unlikely Celebrity: Bill Sackter's Triumph Over Disability by Thomas Walz.

A Friend Indeed – The Bill Sackter Story, a feature-length documentary, was completed in June 2008. Created by filmmaker Lane Wyrick, the documentary explores the life of Bill Sackter using historic photographs, film and video footage, along with interviews with those closest to Bill. Much of the archival footage was taken by Barry Morrow as early as 1972. The documentary shows how Bill Sackter was allowed to develop as an individual with help from many others, and become an important member of the Iowa City community as proprietor of Wild Bill's Coffee Shop. It also follows his rise in becoming a national figure that helped change society's perception of people with disabilities.

The documentary was voted the "#1 Audience Favorite" in five film festivals: The Kansas International Film Festival, Hardacre Film Festival, Omaha Film Festival, Cedar Rapids Independent Film Festival, and the New Strand Film Festival.
