= Barry Morrow =

American screenwriter and producer

- Born: Austin, Minnesota, U.S.
- Occupations: Screenwriter; film producer
- Years active: 1981–present
- Known for: Rain Man
- Children: Clayton Morrow

Barry Morrow is an American screenwriter and producer. He wrote the story and co-wrote the screenplay for Rain Man. He is the father of Emmy Award-winning animator, writer, and storyboard artist Clayton Morrow, and father-in-law of animator and storyboard artist Cindy Morrow.

Morrow was born in Austin, Minnesota and studied at St. Olaf College.

Several of Morrow's scripts are inspired by real people, especially people with disabilities and/or extraordinary talents. These include the savant played by Dustin Hoffman in the film Rain Man, inspired by the real savant Kim Peek; and mentally disabled Bill Sackter, played by Mickey Rooney in the TV movie Bill. Both works received writing Oscar, Emmy and other awards for Morrow and for the actors who portrayed them. Morrow gave his Oscar statuette as a gift to Kim Peek. Morrow wrote CBS's Bill: On His Own (1983) and his relationship with Sackter is presented in the feature-length 2008 documentary A Friend Indeed – The Bill Sackter Story.

Morrow put his Oscar statuette on permanent loan to Salt Lake City in memory of Kim Peek, and put forward the money for the Peek Award, which "pays tribute to artists, media makers, and film subjects who are positively impacting our society’s perception of people with disabilities" and is given out by the Utah Film Center.

Morrow is a member of the Arc of the United States, the National Association of Social Workers, and the Autism Society of America. In 2014, his son, Clay, won the Primetime Emmy Award for Outstanding Short Form Animated Program for the Mickey Mouse short film "O Sole Minnie" (2013).

He is an avid golfer, and is known to play the majority of his golf rounds using an eight club bag of hickory stick (wooden shaft) golf clubs made pre-1940.
