= Dennis Quaid =

American actor (born 1954)

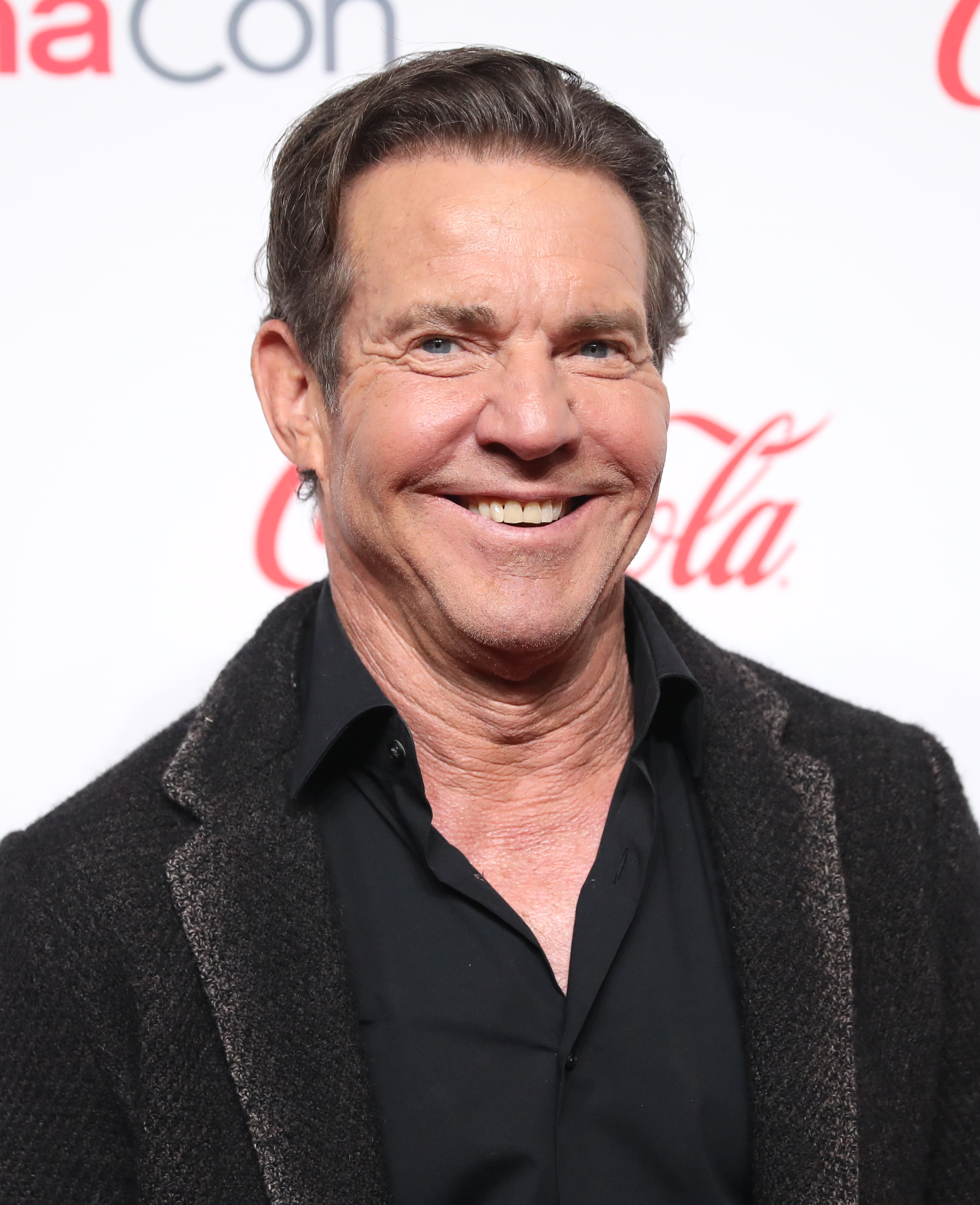
- Quaid in 2024
- Born: Dennis William Quaid; April 9, 1954 (age 72); Houston, Texas, U.S.
- Occupation: Actor
- Years active: 1975–present
- Spouses: P. J. Soles (m. 1978; div. 1983); Meg Ryan (m. 1991; div. 2001); Kimberly Buffington (m. 2004; div. 2018); Laura Savoie (m. 2020)
- Children: 3, including Jack
- Relatives: Randy Quaid (brother); Gene Autry (first cousin twice removed)

Dennis William Quaid (born April 9, 1954) is an American actor. He is known for his starring roles in many successful films, including Breaking Away (1979), Jaws 3-D (1983), Innerspace (1987), Great Balls of Fire! (1989), Dragonheart (1996), The Parent Trap (1998), Frequency (2000), The Rookie (2002), The Alamo, The Day After Tomorrow, In Good Company, Flight of the Phoenix (all 2004), Yours, Mine & Ours (2005), and Vantage Point (2008). In 2003, Quaid received a Golden Globe Award nomination for Far from Heaven (2002).

Quaid portrayed President Bill Clinton in the HBO film The Special Relationship (2010), earning nominations for a Primetime Emmy Award, a Golden Globe Award, and a Screen Actors Guild Award. He also portrayed Deputy U.S. Marshal Sherrill Lynn in the Paramount+ Western series Lawmen: Bass Reeves (2023), and President Ronald Reagan in the biopic Reagan (2024).

== Early life and education ==
Dennis William Quaid was born in Houston, Texas, to Juanita Bonnie Dale "Nita" (née Jordan; 1927–2019), a real-estate agent, and William Rudy Quaid (1923–1987), an electrician. He has English, Irish, Scots-Irish, and Cajun (French) ancestry. Through his father, Quaid is a first cousin, twice removed, of cowboy performer Gene Autry. Quaid attended Paul W. Horn Elementary School in Bellaire and Pershing Middle School in Houston. He studied Mandarin Chinese and dance at Bellaire High School in Bellaire, Texas, and later in college, at the University of Houston, under drama coach Cecil Pickett, who had previously taught at Bellaire High and whose daughter is actress Cindy Pickett. Quaid was raised in the Baptist faith. He is the younger brother of actor Randy Quaid.

== Career ==
=== 1979–1982: Early roles ===
Quaid dropped out of the University of Houston before graduating and moved to Hollywood to pursue an acting career. He made his film debut in an uncredited role in the action comedy film Crazy Mama (1975) starring Cloris Leachman. Quaid then acted in the psychological drama I Never Promised You a Rose Garden (1977) and the drama September 30, 1955 (1977). He initially had trouble finding work but began to gain notice after appearing in Breaking Away (1979) and the musical drama The Night the Lights Went Out in Georgia (1981). During this time, Quaid appeared in a variety of films, such as the drama Our Winning Season (1978), the comedy The Seniors (1978), the romantic comedy All Night Long (1981), and the slapstick comedy Caveman (1981). He portrayed outlaw Ed Miller in the Walter Hill–directed Western drama The Long Riders (1980). Quaid appeared as an extra at a graduation ceremony in the Ivan Reitman–directed comedy Stripes (1981) starring Bill Murray.

=== 1983–2002: Stardom and acclaim ===
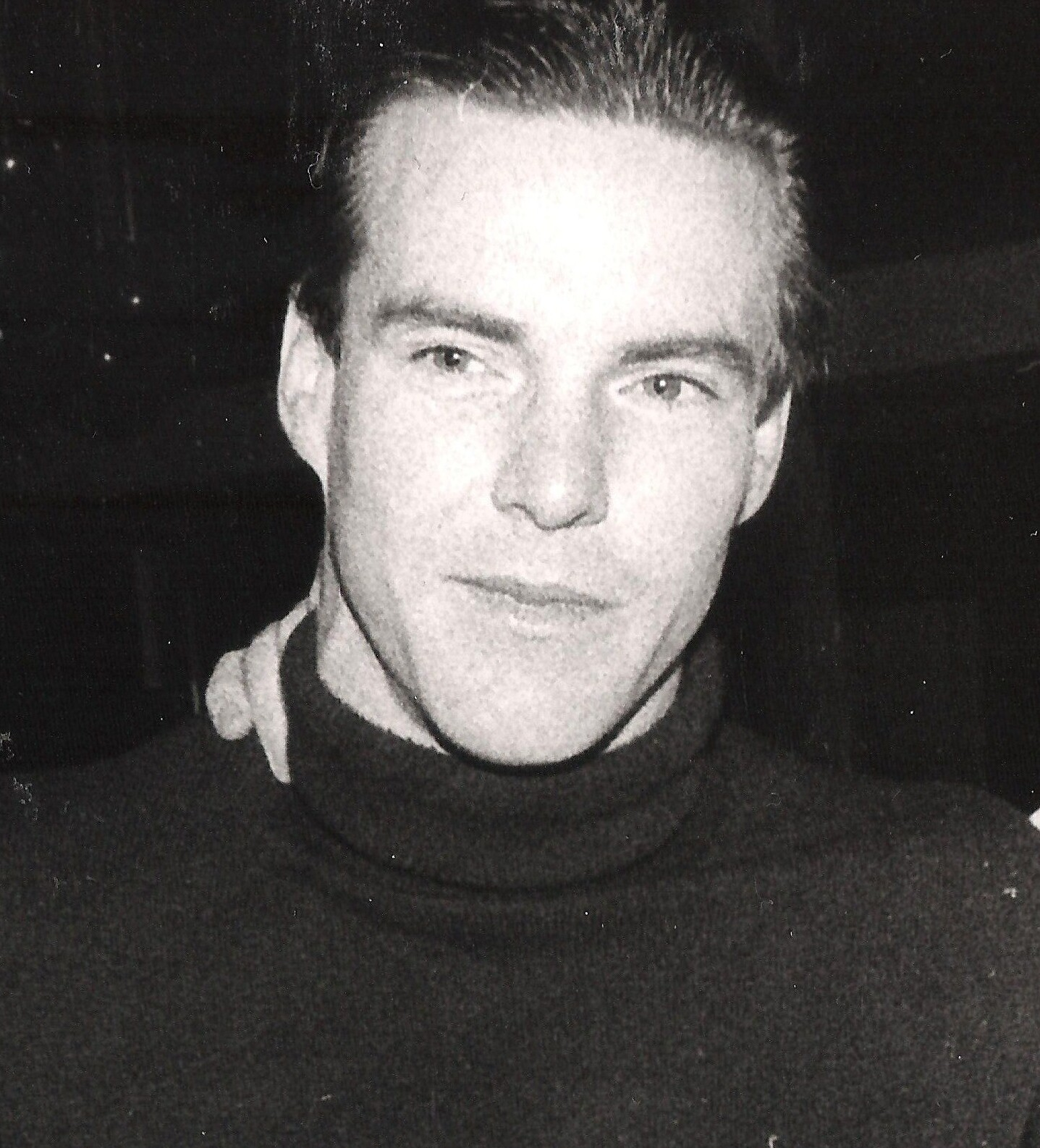
Quaid in 1984

Known for his grin, Quaid has appeared in both comedic and dramatic roles. His breakout role was for his portrayal of astronaut Gordon Cooper in the critically acclaimed Philip Kaufman–directed historical epic The Right Stuff (1983). The film received positive reviews, earning an Academy Award for Best Picture nomination. Critic Roger Ebert praised the film, writing, "It contains uniformly interesting performances", naming Quaid, Ed Harris, Scott Glenn, and Fred Ward. That same year, Quaid had starring roles in the horror film Jaws 3-D (1983) and the romantic sports drama Tough Enough, acting alongside Pam Grier. He later acted in the science fiction films Dreamscape (1984), Enemy Mine (1985), and Innerspace (1987).

In 1987, Quaid starred in the neo-noir romance thriller The Big Easy (1987) opposite Ellen Barkin. Hal Hinson of The Washington Post praised his performance, comparing him to Jack Nicholson: "The same is true for Quaid. A gator grin spreading over his face, Quaid is so unabashedly full of himself that you get swept up in his enthusiastic high spirits. He's a life-giver, like Nicholson." For his performance. Quaid received a nomination for the Independent Spirit Award for Best Male Lead. He also achieved acclaim for his portrayal of Jerry Lee Lewis in Great Balls of Fire! (1989) acting alongside Winona Ryder. In 1989, Quaid also appeared throughout the Bonnie Raitt music video for the song "Thing Called Love."

Quaid's career lost steam in the early 1990s after he fought anorexia nervosa, brought on when he lost 40 pounds to play the tuberculosis-afflicted Doc Holliday in the Western drama Wyatt Earp (1994), and recovered from a cocaine addiction. However, Quaid continued to garner positive reviews in a variety of films. He played the lead role in the 1996 adventure film Dragonheart, and starred in the remake of The Parent Trap (1998) directed by Nancy Meyers, playing the part of the twins' divorced father. He also starred as an aging pro football quarterback in Oliver Stone's Any Given Sunday (1999) and in the science fiction film Frequency (2000). He was the guest star of a Season 2 episode of Muppets Tonight (1997). In 1998, Quaid made his debut as a film director with Everything That Rises, a television movie Western in which Quaid also starred.

In 2000, Quaid acted in Steven Soderbergh's critically acclaimed crime drama Traffic. Quaid earned a nomination for the Screen Actors Guild Award for Outstanding Performance by a Cast in a Motion Picture along with the ensemble. He gained acclaim for his role in the Norman Jewison–directed HBO film Dinner with Friends (2001), based on the Donald Margulies play of the same name; Quaid acted alongside Andie MacDowell, Greg Kinnear, and Toni Collette. In 2002, Quaid portrayed former baseball pitcher Jim Morris in the Walt Disney sports drama The Rookie (2002). That same year, he earned acclaim for his role as the closeted husband Frank Whitaker during the 1950s in the Todd Haynes–directed romantic period film Far From Heaven, where he acted alongside Julianne Moore, earning a nomination for the Golden Globe Award for Best Supporting Actor – Motion Picture, and winning the Independent Spirit Award and the New York Film Critics Circle Award.

=== 2003–present: Established actor ===
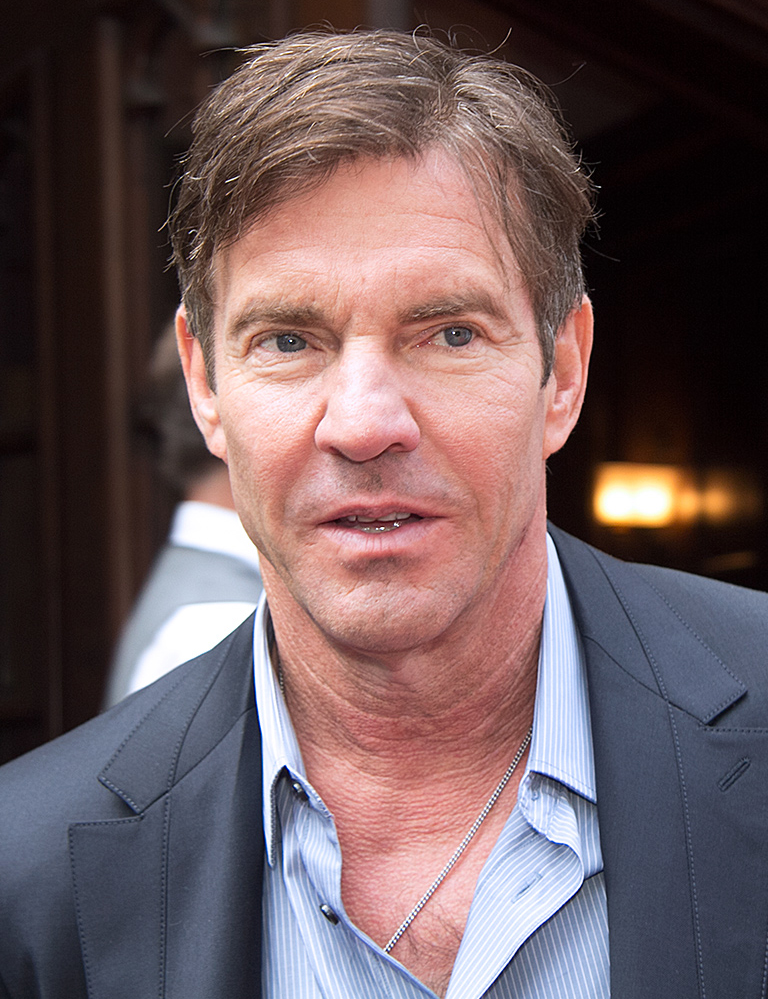
Quaid in 2012

Quaid then acted in films in various genres, such as the thriller Cold Creek Manor (2003), the survival drama Flight of the Phoenix (2004), the war film The Alamo (2004), the romantic comedy In Good Company (2004), the disaster film The Day After Tomorrow (2004), and the family comedy Yours, Mine & Ours (2005). He played the president in the political comedy American Dreamz (2006) with Hugh Grant, Mandy Moore, Marcia Gay Harden, and Willem Dafoe. In 2008, Quaid starred in the political action thriller Vantage Point (2008) alongside Sigourney Weaver, William Hurt, and Forest Whitaker. That same year, he portrayed football coach Ben Schwartzwalder in the sports drama The Express: The Ernie Davis Story (2008). In 2009, Quaid portrayed General Clayton M. Abernathy / Hawk in G.I. Joe: The Rise of Cobra (2009). He also acted in Pandorum (2009) and guest starred in an episode of SpongeBob SquarePants, playing Mr. Krabs' grandfather, Captain Redbeard.

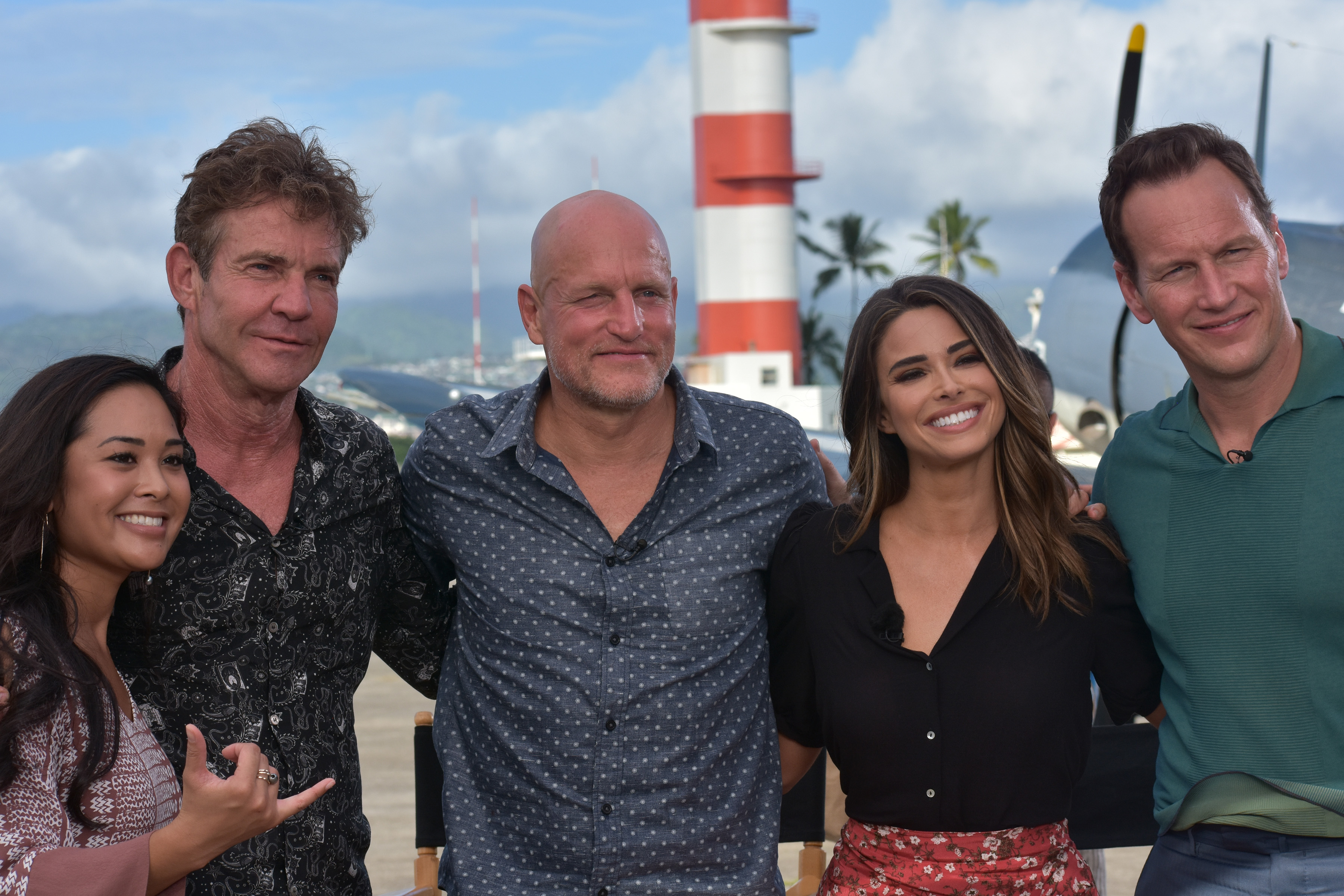
Quaid with the cast from Midway in 2019

Quaid returned to television, portraying U.S. President Bill Clinton alongside Michael Sheen as Tony Blair and Hope Davis as Hillary Clinton, in the HBO film The Special Relationship (2009). He received acclaim as well as nominations for the Primetime Emmy Award for Outstanding Lead Actor in a Limited or Anthology Series or Movie as well as a Golden Globe Award and a Screen Actors Guild Award. In 2012 and 2013, Quaid played Sheriff Ralph Lamb in the CBS TV drama series Vegas. In 2015, he made guest appearances playing Lucky Luciano in Drunk History and a chief and a judge in Inside Amy Schumer. From 2015 to 2016, Quaid played Samuel Brukner in the Crackle series The Art of More. He played Michael Lennox in the British series Fortitude in 2017, and Wade Blackwood in the Amazon Prime legal series Goliath in 2019.

In 2017, Quaid starred in A Dog's Purpose as Ethan Montgomery, billed as "a celebration of the special connection between humans and their dogs." The following year, Quaid starred in I Can Only Imagine, where he played Arthur Millard, the father of singer and songwriter Bart Millard, and Kin, where he plays Hal, the father of the film's two protagonists. In 2019, Quaid portrayed Vice Admiral William 'Bull' Halsey in the war drama Midway. In 2022, he voiced a leading role in the Walt Disney Animated film Strange World. In 2023, Quaid starred in the sports drama The Hill (2023).

In June 2024, Quaid began hosting the series Holy Marvels With Dennis Quaid on the History Channel. He portrayed President Ronald Reagan in a biopic, titled Reagan, the second time Quaid has portrayed a U.S. president. The film was slated to have a summer 2019 release; however, in May 2020 it was still in pre-production and was scheduled to begin filming, but was postponed due to the COVID-19 pandemic. The film was released in theaters on August 30, 2024. The same year, Quaid starred alongside Demi Moore and Margaret Qualley in the body horror film The Substance, in which he portrays a sleazy television studio executive named Harvey. In April 2026, it was reported that Quaid would star in AMC's upcoming drama Thunder Road as stock car driver Duane Whitlock.

== Personal life ==
=== Relationships and children ===
Quaid has been married four times and has three children. He met his first wife, actress P. J. Soles, on the set of the film Our Winning Season. They were married in 1978 and divorced in 1983.

On February 14, 1991, Quaid married actress Meg Ryan. Quaid and Ryan fell in love during the shooting of their second film together, D.O.A. They have a son, Jack Quaid (born 1992). Quaid and Ryan announced their separation on June 28, 2000, saying they had been separated six weeks by then. Their divorce was finalized in July 2001.

Quaid dated model Shanna Moakler from February to October 2001.

Quaid married Texas real estate agent Kimberly Buffington on July 4, 2004, at his ranch in Paradise Valley, Montana. They have fraternal twins who were born via a surrogate on November 8, 2007, in Santa Monica, California.

On November 18, 2007, hospital staff at Cedars-Sinai Medical Center mistakenly gave Quaid's 10-day-old twins a dosage of heparin (a blood thinner) that was 1,000 times the common dosage for infants. The babies recovered, but Quaid filed a lawsuit against the drug manufacturer, Baxter Healthcare, claiming that packaging for the two doses of heparin are not different enough. In May 2008, the Quaids testified before the United States House Committee on Oversight and Government Reform, asking the U.S. Congress not to preempt the right to sue drug manufacturers for negligence under state law. The incident led Quaid to become a patient-safety advocate, producing a series of documentaries on preventable medical errors that aired on the Discovery Channel, as well as co-authoring a medical-journal article addressing the positive influence of patient stories in motivating change in healthcare. The first documentary, Chasing Zero: Winning the War on Healthcare Harm, aired on the Discovery Channel in 2010, and the second documentary, Surfing the Healthcare Tsunami: Bring Your Best Board, aired on the Discovery Channel in 2012.

Buffington filed for divorce from Quaid in March 2012. Buffington's attorney then withdrew the divorce papers on April 26, 2012. That summer, Quaid and Buffington moved to California. In October 2012, he and Buffington again decided to separate, and Buffington filed for legal separation, seeking joint legal and sole physical custody of the twins. After waiting to establish the required six months of residency in California, Quaid filed for divorce on November 30, 2012, asking for joint legal and physical custody of the children and offering to pay spousal support to Buffington. They then reconciled, and the divorce was dismissed by September 2013. On June 28, 2016, the couple announced in a joint statement that they were divorcing, citing "irreconcilable differences" as the reason, with Buffington asking for full physical custody and joint legal custody. The divorce was finalized on April 27, 2018.

Following his separation from Buffington, Quaid dated model Santa Auzina from July 2016 to 2019.

On October 21, 2019, Quaid confirmed his engagement to Laura Savoie. Their original wedding plans were postponed due to the COVID-19 pandemic, and they married on June 2, 2020, in Santa Barbara. Savoie is a CPA and yoga instructor, 39 years his junior, who shares his Christian faith. Quaid says, "God is in the relationship. I've never had a relationship like that before." Together, they launched the production company Bonniedale Films, based in Nashville, where they live.

=== Religious beliefs ===
Quaid is a Christian. He came to faith around 1990 after struggling with addiction. He wrote the Christian song "On My Way to Heaven", dedicated to his mother and included in the film I Can Only Imagine, in which he starred.

=== Interests ===
In addition to acting, Quaid is a musician and plays with his band, the Sharks. Quaid wrote and performed the song "Closer to You" in the film The Big Easy (1987). He also has a pilot's license and owned a Cessna Citation. Quaid is also a one-handicap golfer, and in 2005, he was named the top golfer among the "Hollywood set" by Golf Digest magazine.

Quaid is a fan of the Houston Astros, and after the team's 2005 National League Championship-winning season, he narrated their commemorative DVD release. After the filming of The Express: The Ernie Davis Story, Quaid went to Cleveland Browns Stadium to dedicate Davis's jersey.

Quaid began podcasting in 2020, starting The Pet Show with Dennis Quaid and Jimmy Jellinek. Its first episode premiered on July 10, 2020. During that podcast, Quaid learned of a shelter cat in Lynchburg, Virginia, also named Dennis Quaid. He adopted the cat and flew it out to California to live at his recording studio.

=== Substance use ===
There have been extensive stories about Quaid's past abuse of cocaine. In a 2002 interview with Larry King on his talk show, after King asked about his motives for using drugs, Quaid responded, "Well, you got to put it in context. Back in the late 1960s, early 1970s. That was back during the time where, you know, drugs were going to expand our minds and everybody was experimenting and everything. We were really getting high, we didn't know it. And cocaine at that time was considered harmless. You know. I remember magazine articles in People magazine of doctors saying it is not addicting. It is just—alcohol is worse. So I think we all fell into that. But that's not the way it was."

When Quaid was asked if he believed he had ever been addicted to the drugs, Quaid responded, "It was a gradual thing. But it got to the point where I couldn't have any fun unless I had it. Which is a bad place to be." Later in the interview, he said, "But I saw myself being dead in about five years if I didn't stop."

=== Political views ===
In a 2018 interview with the New York Post, Quaid stated he was a registered independent and has voted for both Democratic and Republican candidates, saying that he did not consider himself an adherent of any particular ideology, though he did opine that Ronald Reagan was his favorite president of his lifetime. In April 2020, during the COVID-19 pandemic, Quaid stated that President Donald Trump was handling the pandemic well, calling him "involved." Quaid subsequently recorded an interview with infectious-disease expert Anthony Fauci as part of an advertising campaign by the Department of Health and Human Services to "defeat despair" surrounding COVID-19.

In May 2024, Quaid endorsed Donald Trump for President during an interview on Piers Morgan Uncensored and, on October 12, 2024, he spoke at Trump's rally in Coachella, California.

In late February 2026, Quaid was traveling on Air Force One when President Trump issued the final approval to military leaders for the bombing of Iran, launching the 2026 Iran war. Quaid was on board along with the President, US Senator Ted Cruz, and US Senator John Cornyn.

== Filmography ==
Key
†	Denotes films that have not yet been released

=== Film ===
Year	Title	Role	Notes	Ref(s)
1975	Crazy Mama	Bellhop	Uncredited	
1977	I Never Promised You a Rose Garden	Shark, Baseball Pitcher		
1977	September 30, 1955	Frank		
1978	Our Winning Season	Paul Morelli		
1978	The Seniors	Alan Darby		
1979	Breaking Away	Mike		
1980	The Long Riders	Ed Miller		
1980	Gorp	"Mad" Grossman		
1981	All Night Long	Freddie Dupler		
1981	Caveman	Lar		
1981	The Night the Lights Went Out in Georgia	Travis Child		
1981	Stripes	Extra at Graduation Ceremony	Uncredited	
1983	Tough Enough	Art Long		
1983	Jaws 3-D	Michael "Mike" Brody		
1983	The Right Stuff	Gordon Cooper		
1984	Dreamscape	Alex Gardner		
1985	Enemy Mine	Willis E. "Will" Davidge		
1987	The Big Easy	Detective Lieutenant Remy McSwain		
1987	Innerspace	Lieutenant Tuck Pendleton		
1987	Suspect	Eddie Sanger		
1988	D.O.A.	Professor Dexter Cornell		
1988	Everybody's All-American	Gavin "Grey Ghost" Grey		
1989	Great Balls of Fire!	Jerry Lee Lewis		
1990	Come See the Paradise	Jack McGurn / McGann		
1990	Postcards from the Edge	Jack Faulkner		
1993	Wilder Napalm	Wallace Foudroyant / Biff The Clown		
1993	Undercover Blues	Jefferson "Jeff" Blue		
1993	Flesh and Bone	Arlis Sweeney		
1994	A Century of Cinema	Himself	Documentary	
1994	Wyatt Earp	Doc Holliday		
1995	Something to Talk About	Eddie Bichon		
1996	Dragonheart	Sir Bowen		
1997	Gang Related	Joe Doe / William McCall		
1997	Switchback	FBI Special Agent Frank LaCrosse		
1998	The Parent Trap	Nicholas "Nick" Parker		
1998	Savior	Joshua Rose / Guy		
1998	Playing by Heart	Hugh		
1999	Any Given Sunday	Jack "Cap" Rooney		
2000	Frequency	Frank Sullivan		
2000	Traffic	Arnie Metzger		
2002	The Rookie	Jim Morris		
2002	Far from Heaven	Frank Whitaker		
2003	Cold Creek Manor	Cooper Tilson		
2004	The Alamo	Sam Houston		
2004	The Day After Tomorrow	Jack Hall		
2004	In Good Company	Dan Foreman		
2004	Flight of the Phoenix	Captain Franklin "Frank" Towns		
2005	Yours, Mine & Ours	Rear Admiral Frank Beardsley, USCG		
2006	American Dreamz	President Joseph Staton		
2007	Battle for Terra	Roven	Voice role	
2008	Vantage Point	Secret Service Agent Thomas Barnes		
2008	Smart People	Lawrence Wetherhold		
2008	The Express: The Ernie Davis Story	Ben Schwartzwalder		
2009	Horsemen	Aidan Breslin		
2009	G.I. Joe: The Rise of Cobra	General Clayton M. Abernathy / Hawk		
2009	Pandorum	Lieutenant Payton / Older Corporal Gallo		
2010	Legion	Bob Hanson		
2011	Soul Surfer	Tom Hamilton		
2011	Footloose	Reverend Shaw Moore		
2011	Beneath the Darkness	Vaughn Ely		
2012	What to Expect When You're Expecting	Ramsey Cooper		
2012	The Words	Clay Hammond		
2012	Playing for Keeps	Carl King		
2012	At Any Price	Henry Whipple		
2013	Movie 43	Charlie Wessler	Segment: "The Pitch"	
2015	Miracles on the Plain	Narrator	Voice; Documentary	
2015	Truth	Colonel Roger Charles		
2017	A Dog's Purpose	Adult Ethan Montgomery		
2018	I Can Only Imagine	Arthur Millard		
2018	Kin	Hal Solinski		
2018	Pretenders	Joe		
2019	The Intruder	Charlie Peck		
2019	A Dog's Journey	Ethan Montgomery		
2019	Midway	Vice Admiral William "Bull" Halsey		
2021	Born a Champion	Mason		
2021	Blue Miracle	Captain Wade Malloy		
2021	American Underdog	Dick Vermeil		
2022	The Tiger Rising	Beauchamp		
2022	Strange World	Jaeger Clade	Voice role	
2023	The Long Game	Frank Mitchell		
2023	On a Wing and a Prayer	Doug White		
2023	Strays	The Birdwatcher		
2023	The Hill	Pastor James Hill		
2024	The Substance	Harvey		
2024	Reagan	Ronald Reagan		
2025	Broke	George Brandywine		
2025	Saurus City	Rind, the Shrouded Knight	Voice role	
2025	Sovereign	Chief John Bouchart		
2026	I Can Only Imagine 2	Arthur Millard		
2026	War Machine	Army Sgt Maj Sheridan		
2026	Signal One	Sam Houston		
2026	The Florist	Carl Rikker		
2026	A Dog's Perfect Christmas	Sander Goss		
TBA	America's Favorite †	—N/a	Post-production	

=== Television ===
Year	Title	Role	Notes	Ref(s)
1977	Baretta	Scott Martin	Episode: "The Sky Is Falling"	
1978	Are You in the House Alone?	Phil Lawver	Television film	
1979	Amateur Night at the Dixie Bar and Grill	Roy	Television film	
1981	Bill	Barry Morrow	Television film	
1982	Johnny Belinda	Kyle Hager	Television film	
1983	Bill: On His Own	Barry Morrow	Television film	
1997	Sesame Street: Kids' Guide to Life	Uncle Tommy	Episode: "Telling the Truth"	
1997	Muppets Tonight	Himself	Episode: "Dennis Quaid"	
1998	Everything that Rises	Jim Clay	Television film; also director	
2001	Dinner with Friends	Gabe	Television film	
2009	SpongeBob SquarePants	Grandpa Redbeard	Voice role; Episode: "Grandpappy the Pirate"	
2010	The Special Relationship	Bill Clinton	Television film	
2010	Chasing Zero: Winning the War on Healthcare Harm	Himself / The Narrator	Documentary	
2012–2013	Vegas	Sheriff Ralph Lamb	21 episodes; also executive producer	
2015	Inside Amy Schumer	Chief / Judge	2 episodes	
2015	Drunk History	Lucky Luciano	Episode: "Las Vegas"	
2015–2016	The Art of More	Samuel Brukner	20 episodes	
2017	Workaholics	Ted Murphy	Episode: "Weed the People"	
2017	Fortitude	Michael Lennox	10 episodes	
2019	Goliath	Wade Blackwood	Main cast; season 3	
2019	Merry Happy Whatever	Don Quinn	Main cast	
2021	Pawn Stars	Himself	Episode: "Pawn Stars and Movie Stars"	
2023	Full Circle	Jeff McCusker	Main role, miniseries	
2023	Lawmen: Bass Reeves	Sherrill Lynn	Main role, miniseries	
2024	Holy Marvels With Dennis Quaid	Himself / Host	Documentary	
2025	Happy Face	Keith Hunter Jesperson/Happy Face Killer	Lead role	

=== Theatre ===
Year	Title	Role	Playwright	Venue	Ref(s)
1983	True West	Austin	Sam Shepard	Cherry Lane Theatre, Off-Broadway	

== Awards and nominations ==
For Far from Heaven (2002), Quaid won the New York Film Critics Circle Award for Best Supporting Actor, the Chicago Film Critics Association Award for Best Supporting Actor, the Online Film Critics Society Award for Best Supporting Actor, and the Independent Spirit Award for Best Supporting Male. He received nominations for Best Supporting Actor from the Golden Globe Awards, the Phoenix Film Critics Society Awards, and the Screen Actors Guild Awards. Quaid was also honored with a Distinguished Alumni Award from his alma mater, the University of Houston, in April 2012.

Year	Association	Category	Work	Result	Ref(s)
1987	Valladolid International Film Festival	Best Lead Actor	The Big Easy	Won	
1988	Independent Spirit Awards	Best Male Lead	The Big Easy	Won	
1989	Jupiter Awards	Best International Actor	The Big Easy	Nominated	
2001	Saturn Awards	Best Supporting Actor	Frequency	Nominated	
2001	Screen Actors Guild	Outstanding Ensemble in a Motion Picture	Traffic	Won	
2002	New York Film Critics Circle	Best Supporting Actor	Far from Heaven	Won	
2002	Toronto Film Critics Association	Best Supporting Performance – Male	Far from Heaven	Nominated	
2003	Chicago Film Critics Association	Best Supporting Actor	Far from Heaven	Won	
2003	Gold Derby Awards	Best Supporting Actor	Far from Heaven	Nominated	
2003	Golden Globe Awards	Best Supporting Actor in a Motion Picture	Far from Heaven	Nominated	
2003	Independent Spirit Awards	Best Supporting Male	Far from Heaven	Won	
2003	Online Film Critics Society	Best Supporting Actor	Far from Heaven	Won	
2003	Satellite Awards	Best Supporting Actor in a Motion Picture – Drama	Far from Heaven	Nominated	
2003	Screen Actors Guild	Outstanding Actor in a Supporting Role	Far from Heaven	Nominated	
2003	Vancouver Film Critics Circle	Best Supporting Actor	Far from Heaven	Nominated	
2010	Primetime Emmy Awards	Outstanding Lead Actor in a Miniseries or a Movie	The Special Relationship	Nominated	
2010	Satellite Awards	Best Lead Actor in a Miniseries or TV Movie	The Special Relationship	Nominated	
2011	Golden Globe Awards	Best Lead Actor in a Motion Picture Made for Television	The Special Relationship	Nominated	
2011	Screen Actors Guild	Outstanding Actor in a Television Movie or Miniseries	The Special Relationship	Nominated	
2016	Houston Film Critics Society	Lifetime Achievement	N/A	Won	
2025	Golden Raspberry Awards	Worst Actor	Reagan	Nominated	
2025	Golden Raspberry Awards	Worst Screen Combo (Note: Shared with Penelope Ann Miller)	Reagan	Nominated	
