= Golden Globe Award for Best Actor – Miniseries or Television Film =

Annual television award

Golden Globe Award for Best Actor – Miniseries or Motion Picture Made for Television
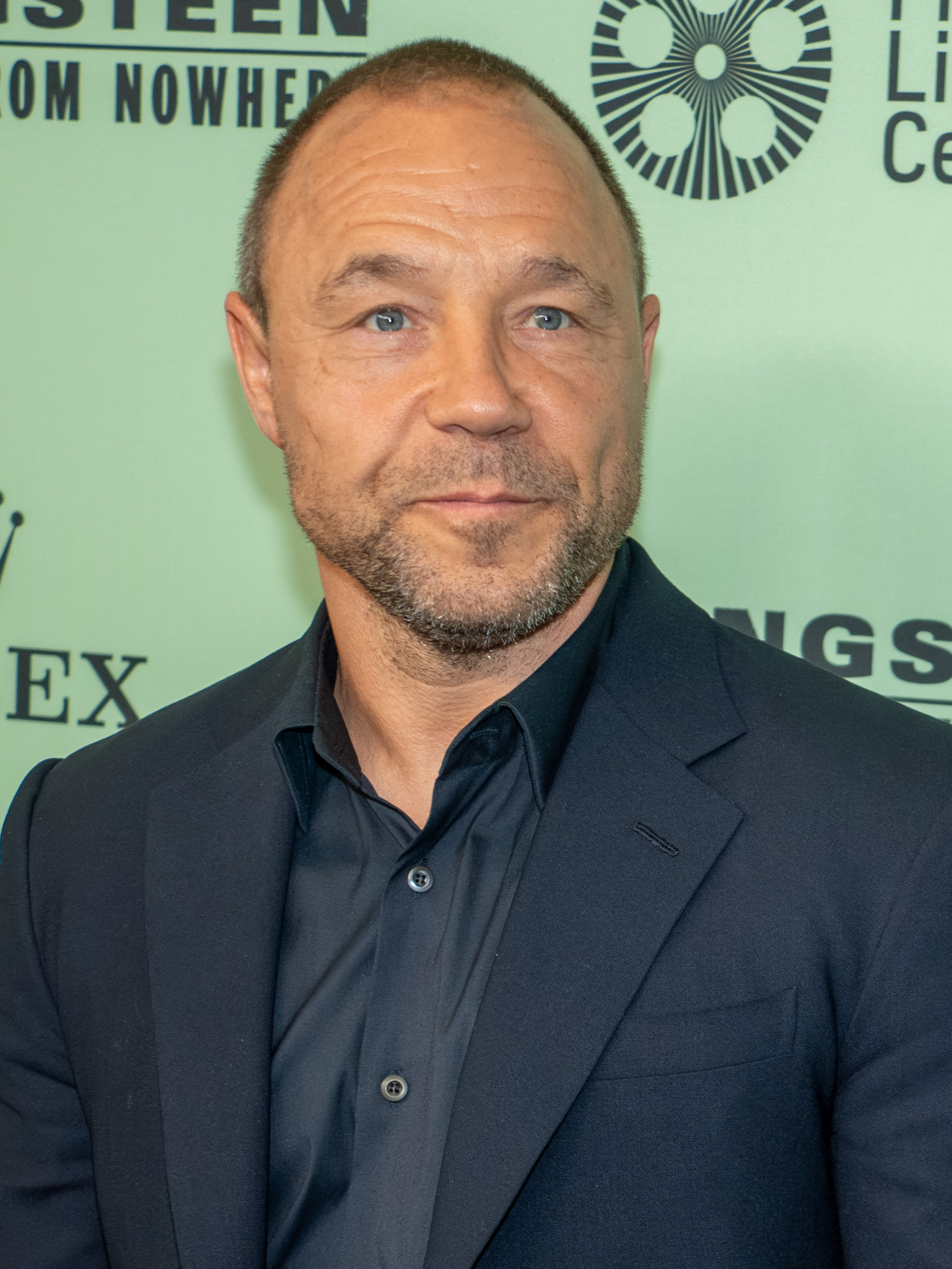
- The 2025 recipient: Stephen Graham
- Awarded for: Best Performance by an Actor in a Leading Role in a Miniseries or Television Film
- Country: United States
- Presented by: Hollywood Foreign Press Association
- First award: January 30, 1982
- Currently held by: Stephen Graham, Adolescence (2025)

Highlights
- Most awards: Robert Duvall / James Garner / Al Pacino (each won 2)
- Most nominations: James Woods (7)
- Website: goldenglobes.com

The Golden Globe Award for Best Actor – Miniseries or Television Film or Best Actor – Miniseries or Motion Picture Made for Television is a Golden Globe Award presented annually by the Hollywood Foreign Press Association (HFPA).

It is given in honor of an actor who has delivered an outstanding performance in a leading role on a miniseries or motion picture made for television for the calendar year. The award was first presented at the 39th Golden Globe Awards on January 30, 1982, to Mickey Rooney for his role on the made-for-television film Bill. Performances by an actor in a miniseries or television film were originally awarded in the Best Actor – Television Series Drama category before the creation of this category.

Since its inception, the award has been given to 44 actors. One notable moment happened at the 55th Golden Globe Awards ceremony, when Ving Rhames won for his portrayal of Don King in the HBO television film Don King: Only in America. During the ceremony, Rhames gave the award to fellow nominee Jack Lemmon, who was nominated for playing Juror #3 in the Showtime television film 12 Angry Men. Rhames called upon Lemmon from the audience and said "I feel that being an artist is about giving, and I'd like to give this to you."

Stephen Graham is the current recipient of the award for his performance in Adolescence. Robert Duvall, James Garner, and Al Pacino have won the most awards in this category with two each. James Woods has been nominated for the award on seven occasions, the most within the category.

== Winners and nominees ==
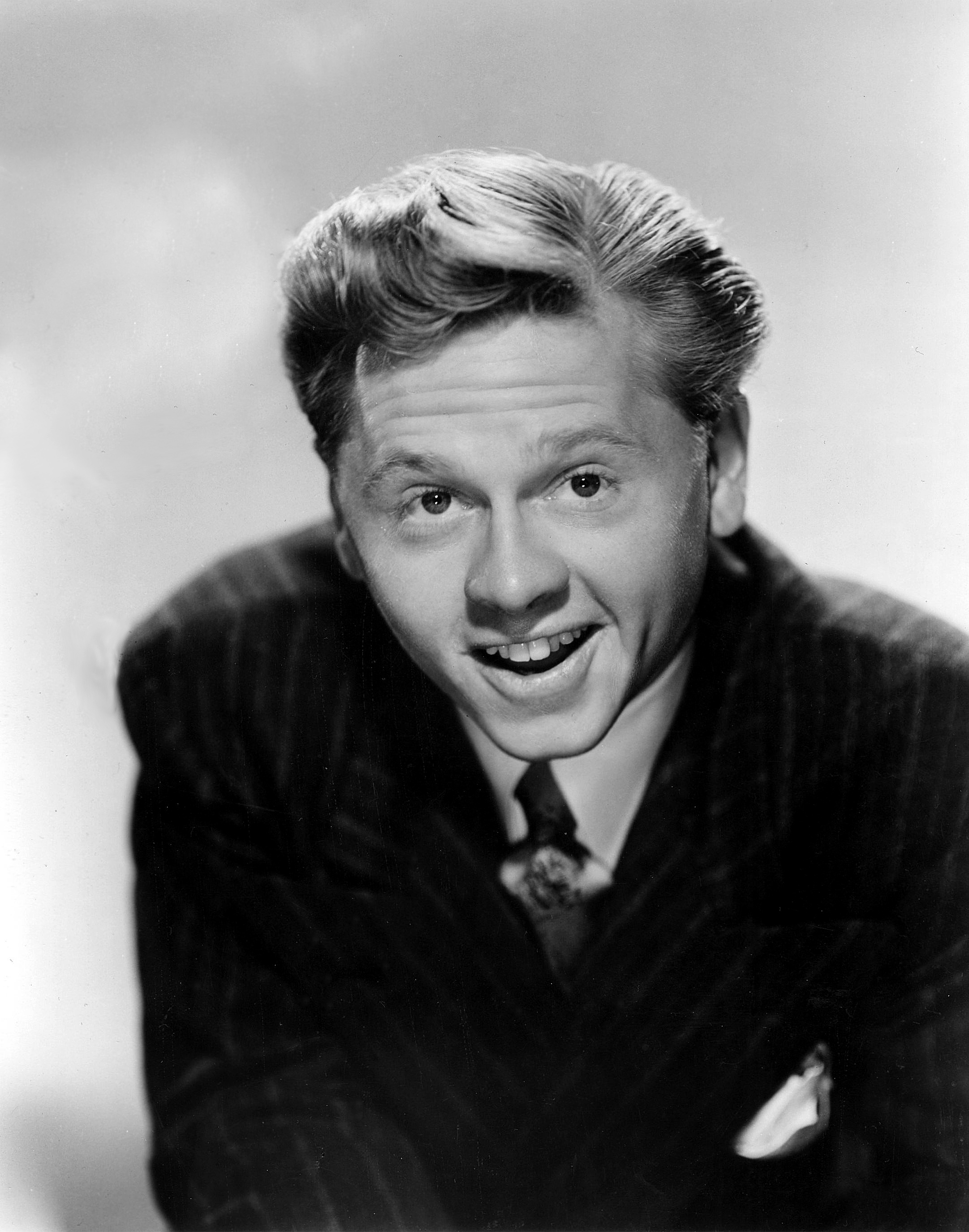
Mickey Rooney was the first recipient of the award, winning for his role on Bill as Bill Sackter.

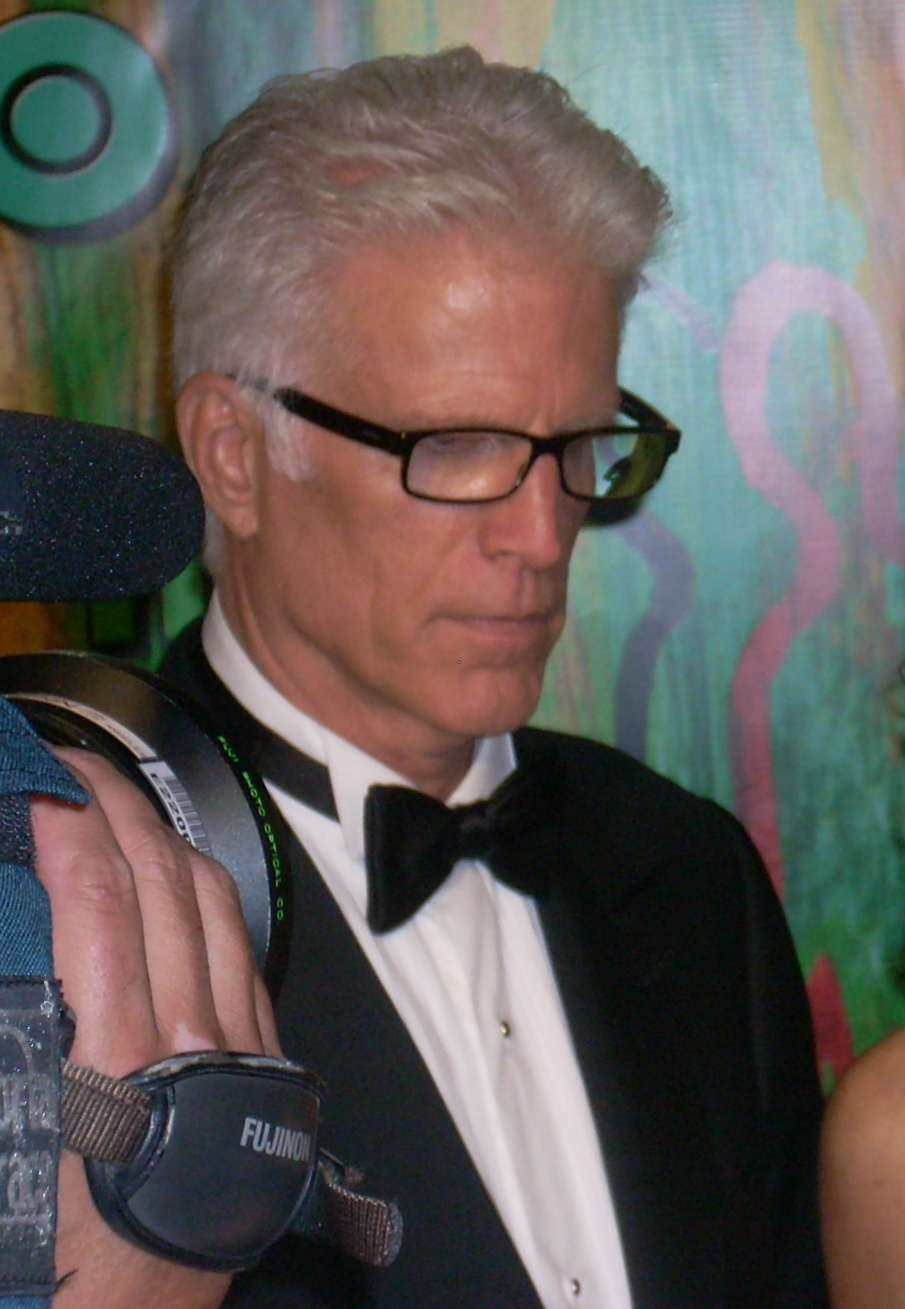
Ted Danson won for Something About Amelia (1984).

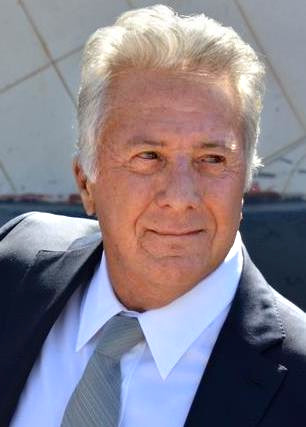
Dustin Hoffman won for Death of a Salesman (1985)

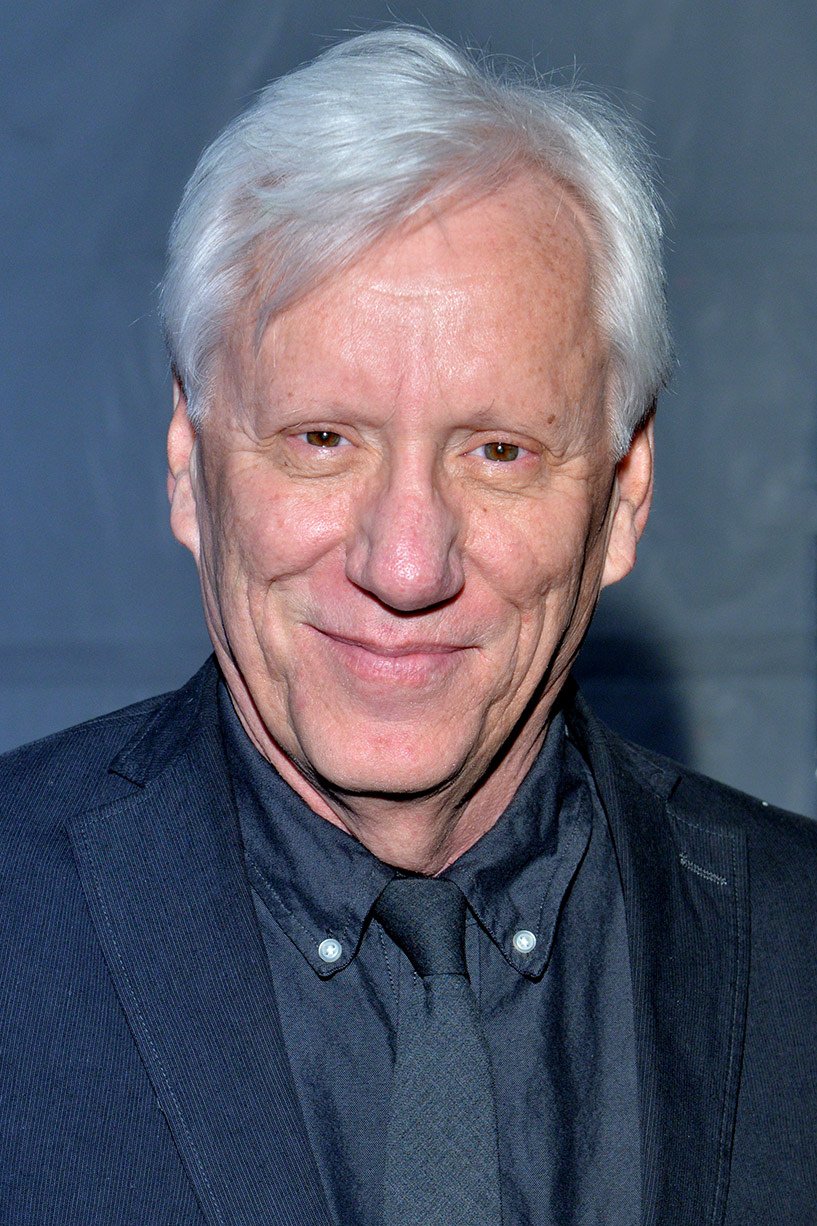
Out of seven nominations, the most in the category, James Woods won for his role as D.J. in Promise (1986).

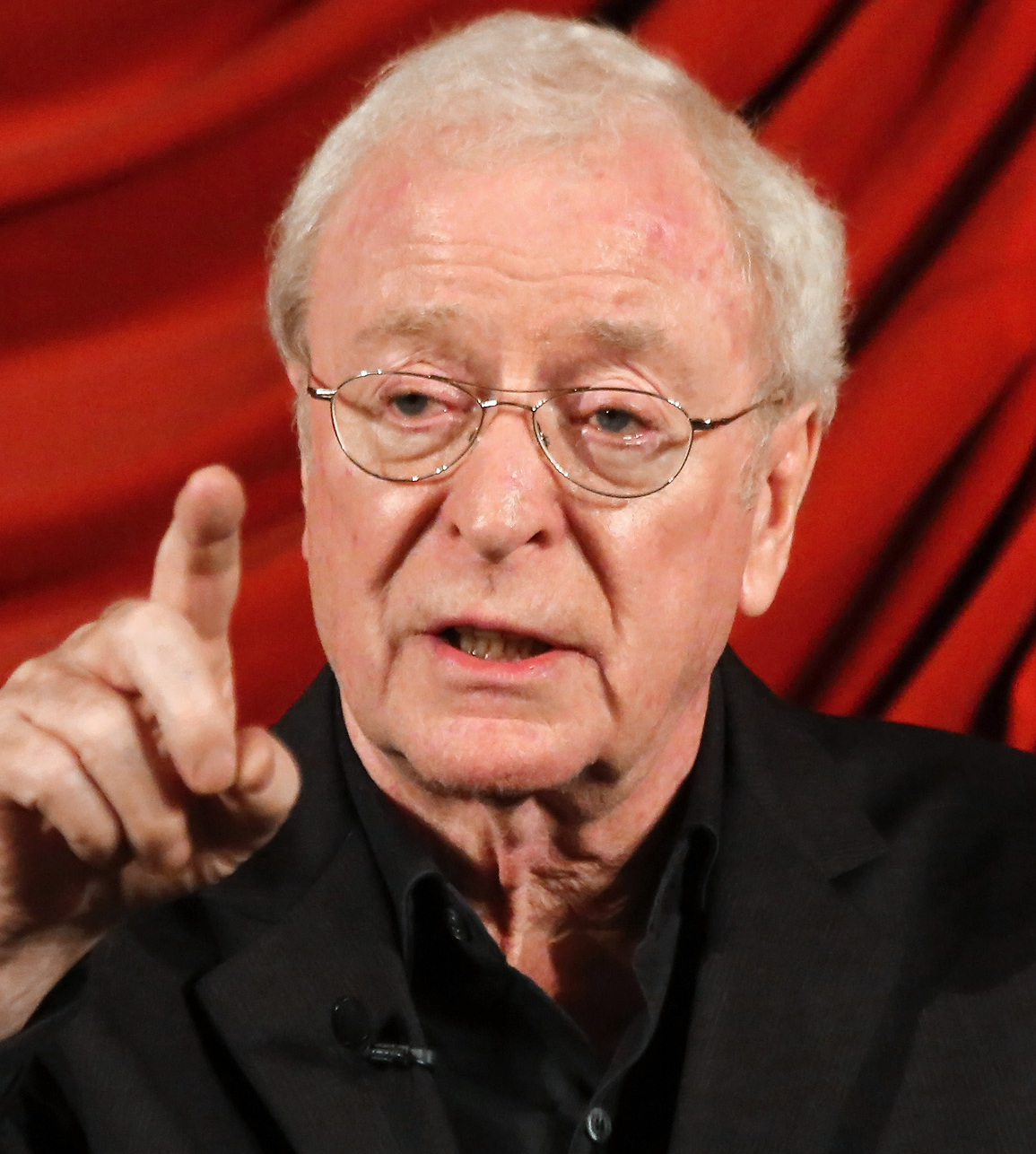
Michael Caine won for Jack the Ripper (1988)

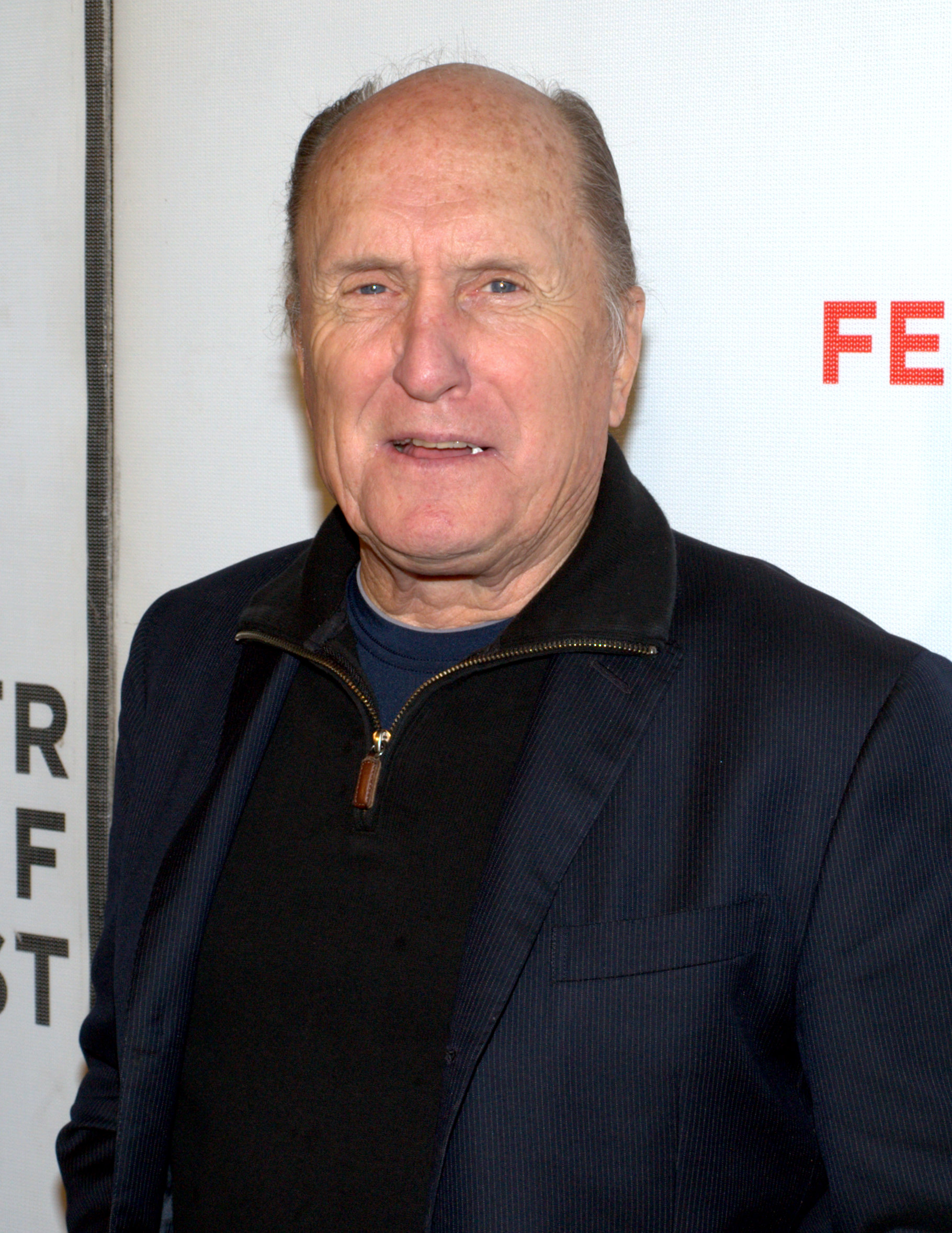
Robert Duvall won for Lonesome Dove (1989) and Stalin (1992).

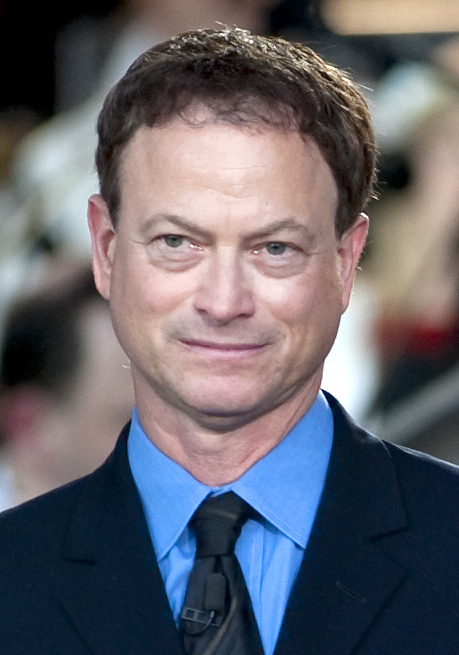
Gary Sinise won for playing Harry S. Truman in Truman (1995)

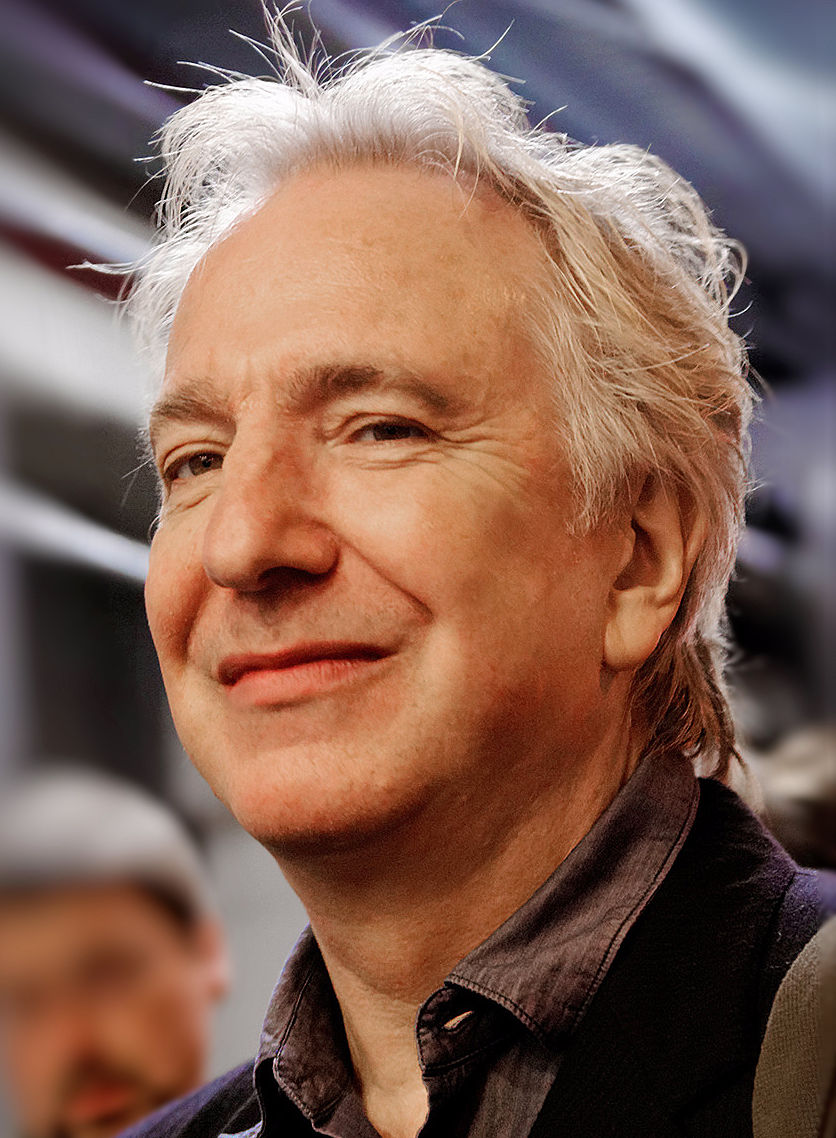
Alan Rickman won playing the title role in Rasputin: Dark Servant of Destiny (1996).

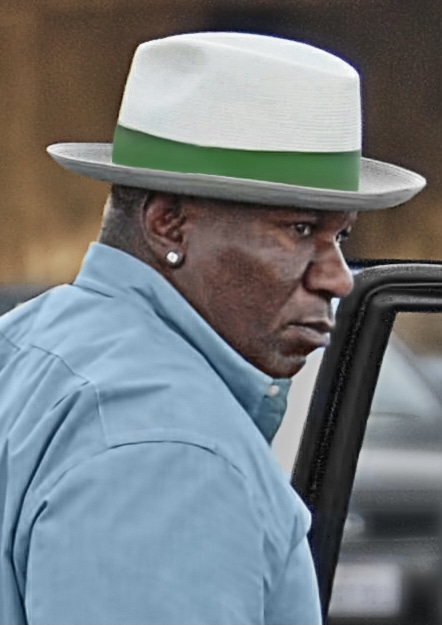
Ving Rhames won in 1997 for his portrayal of Don King in Don King: Only in America.

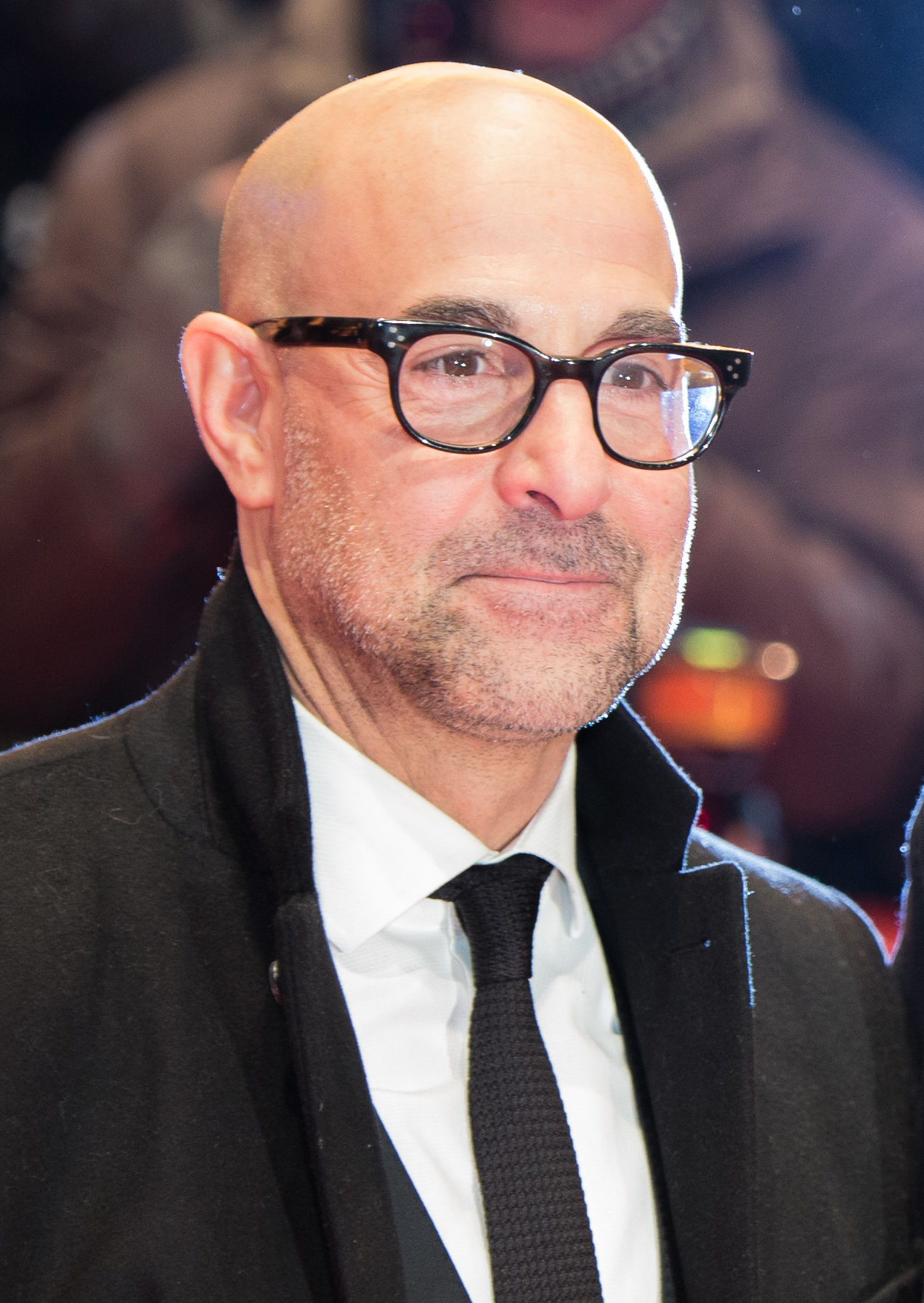
Stanley Tucci won playing Walter Winchell in Winchell (1998).

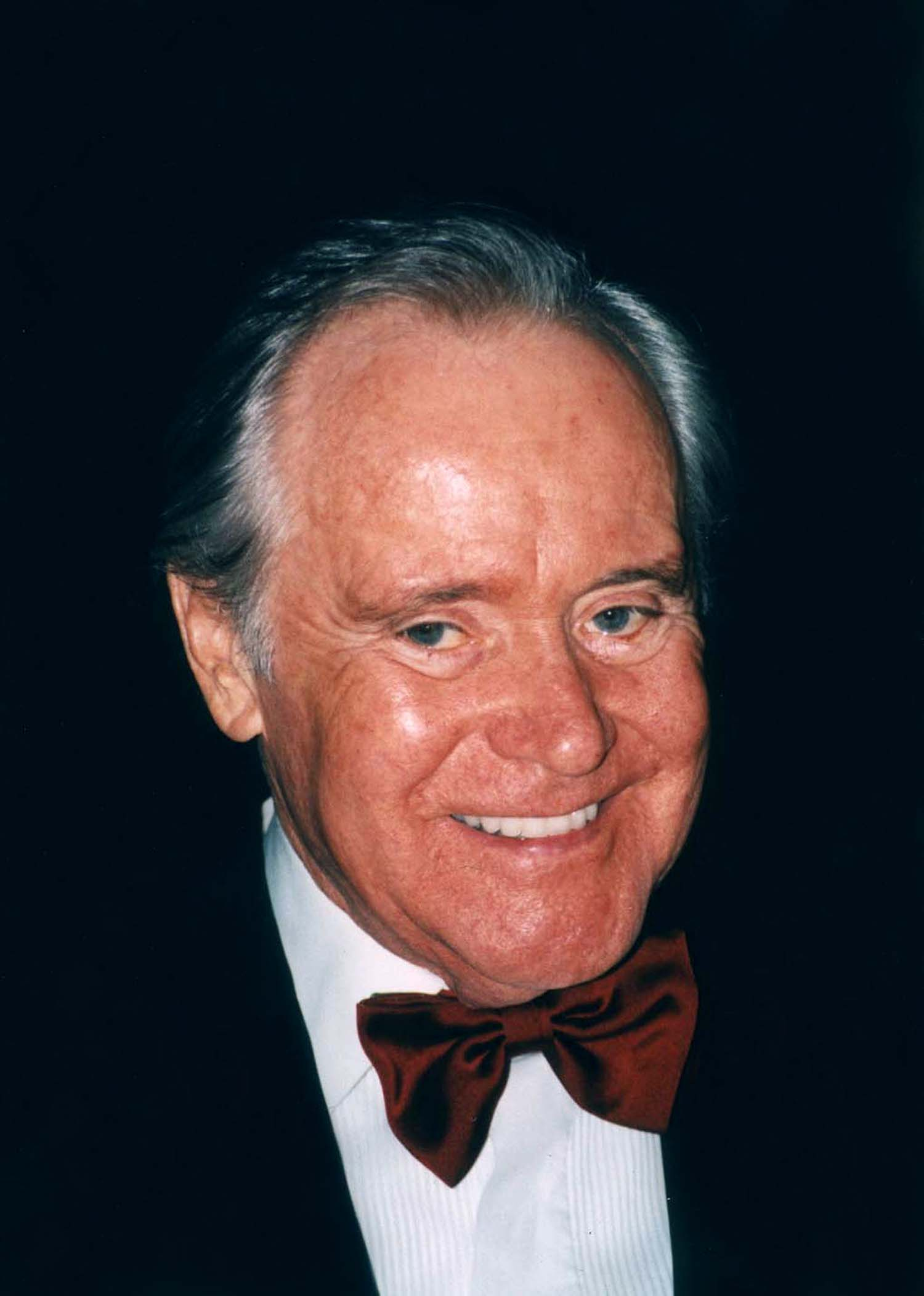
Jack Lemmon won for Inherit the Wind (1999).

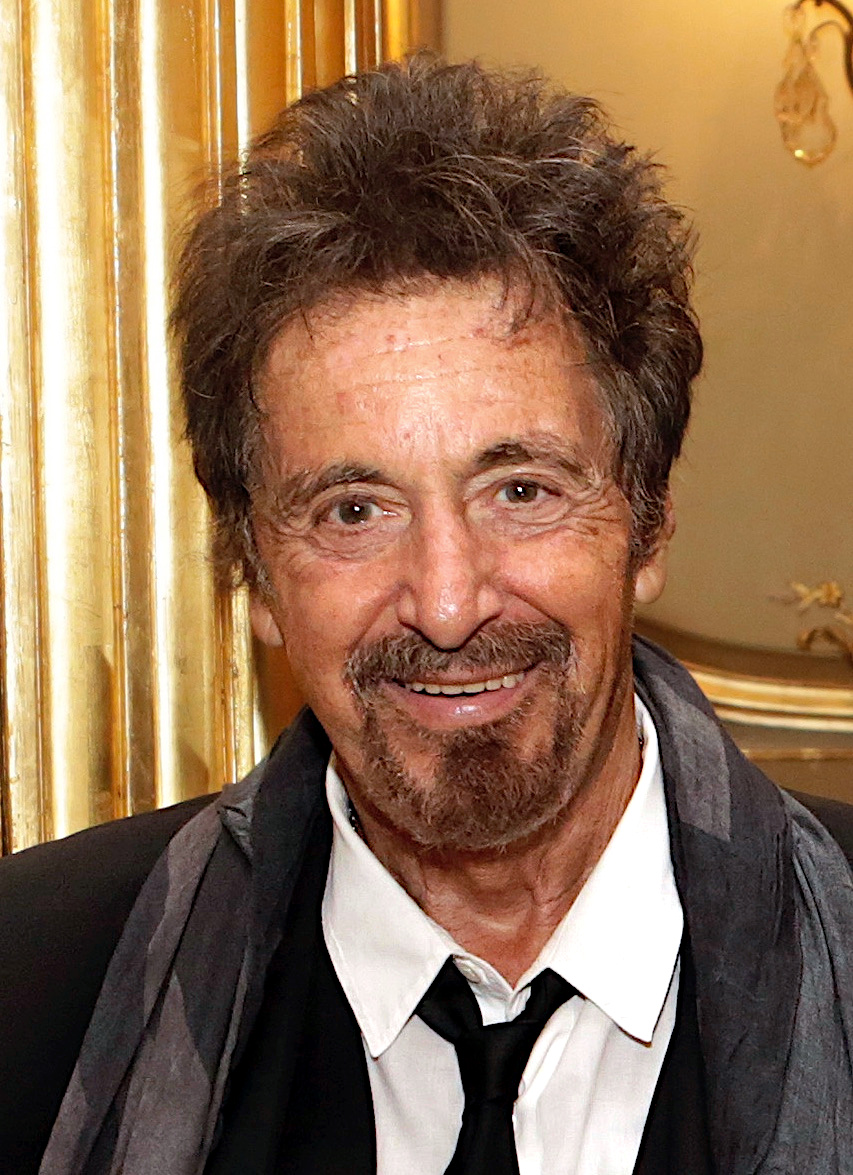
Al Pacino won twice for Angels in America (2003) and You Don't Know Jack (2010).

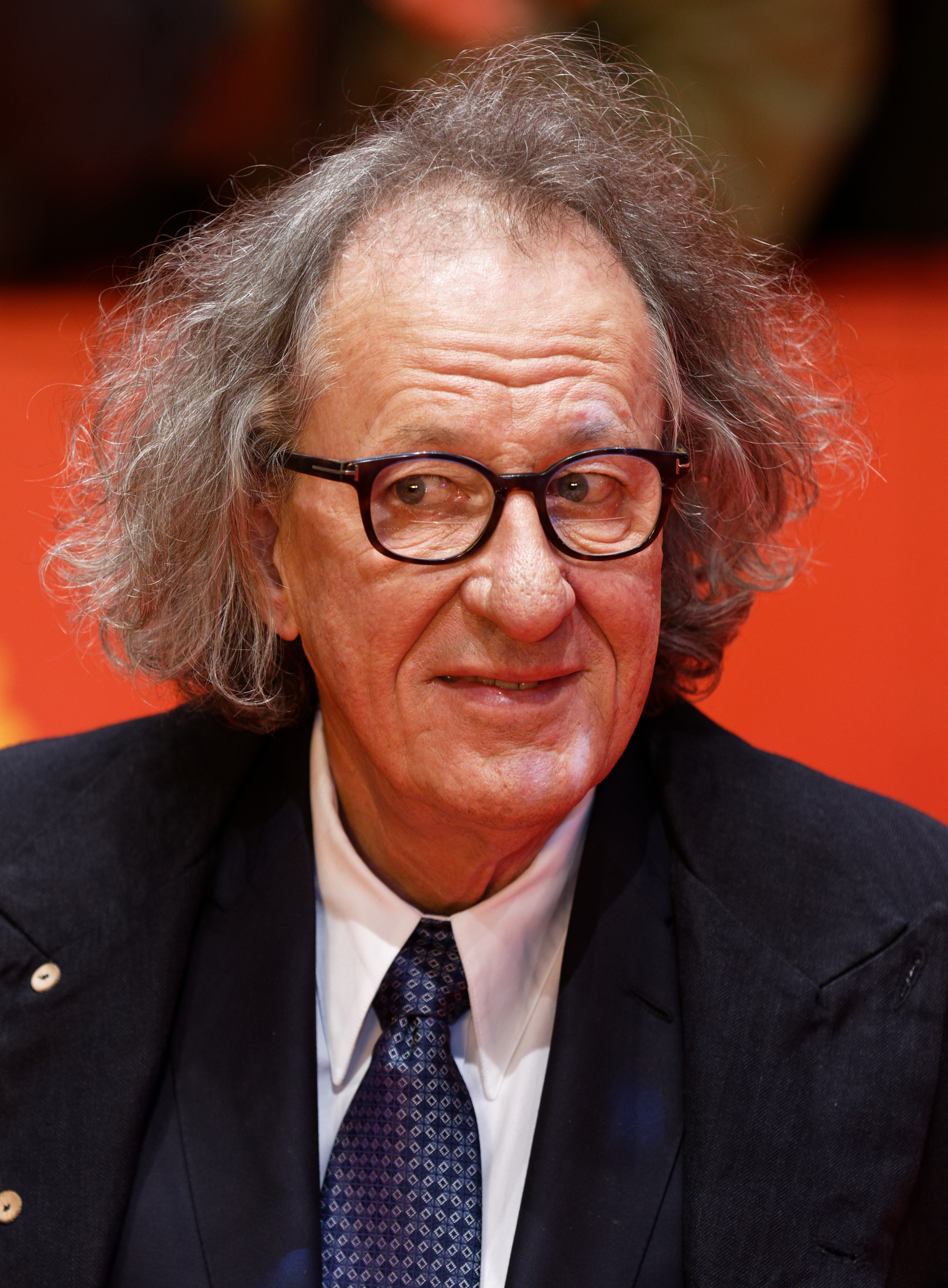
Geoffrey Rush won for The Life and Death of Peter Sellers (2004)

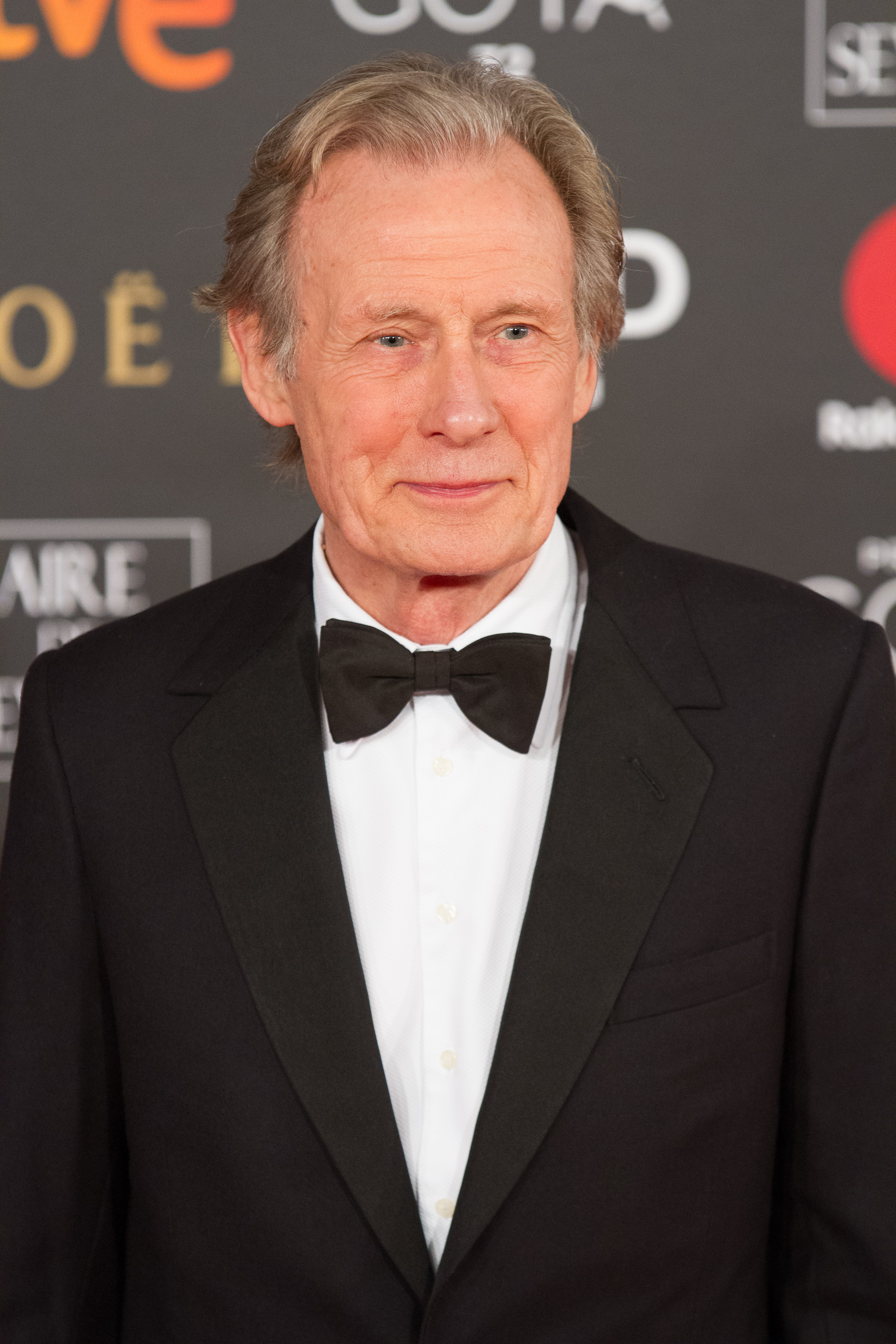
Bill Nighy won for Gideon's Daughter (2006).

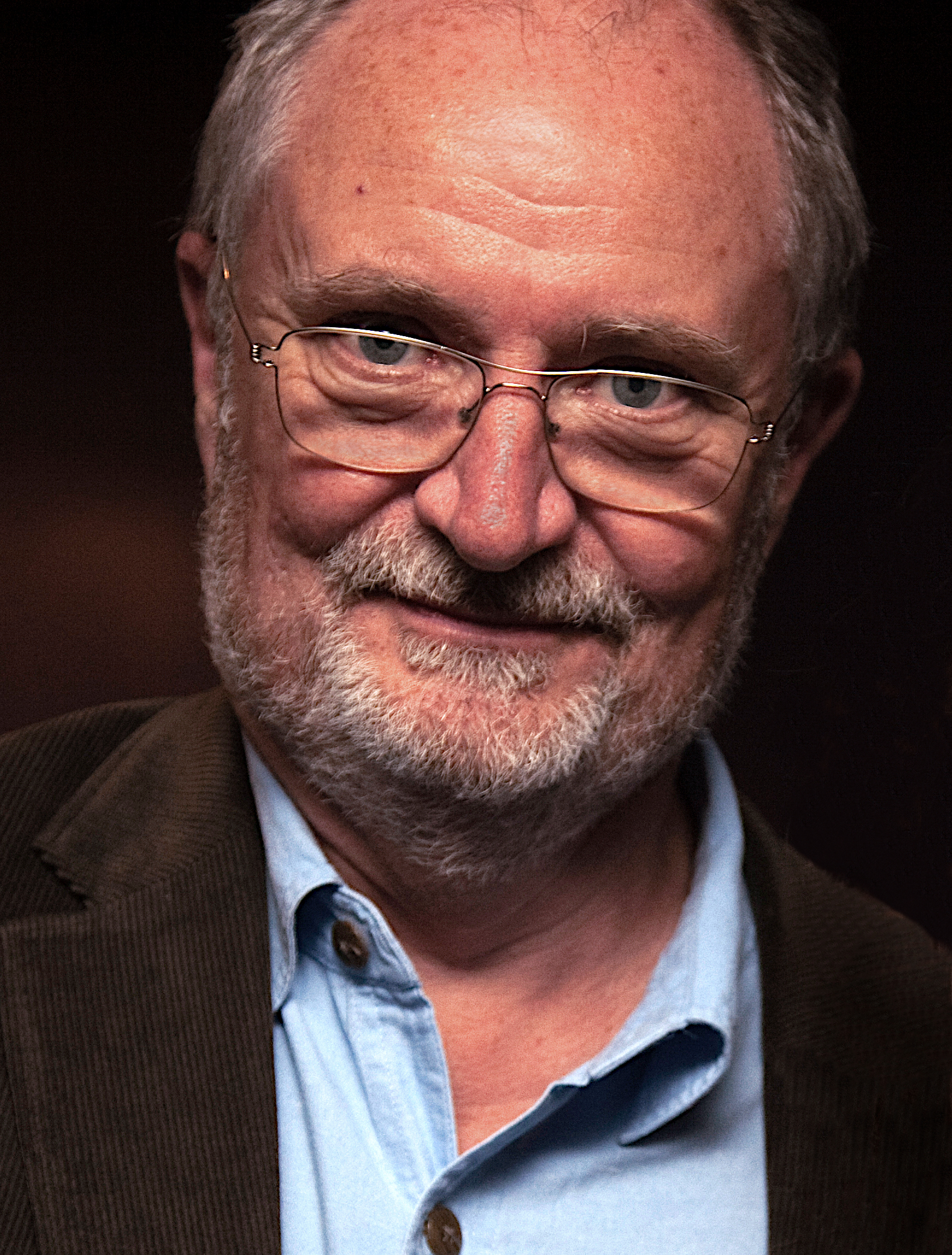
Jim Broadbent won for Longford (2007)

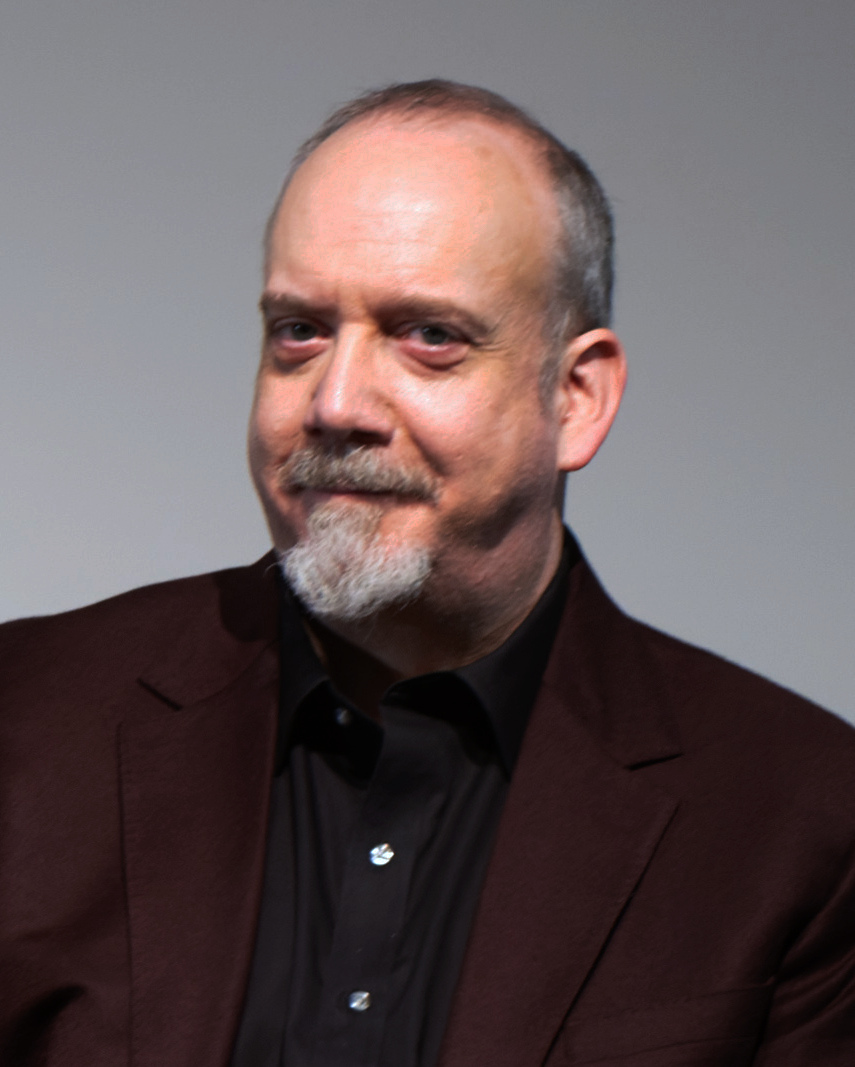
Paul Giamatti won in 2008 for John Adams.

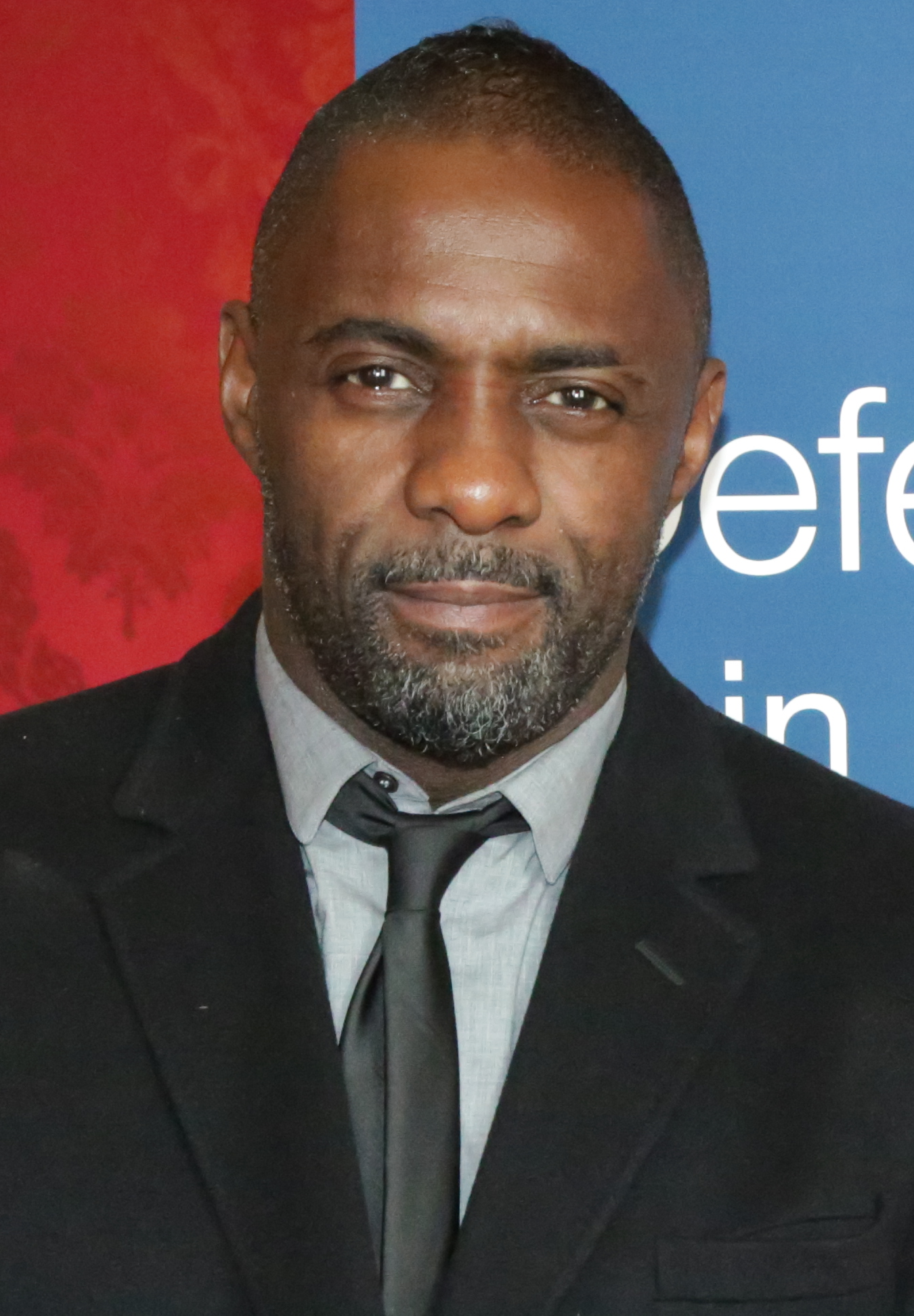
Idris Elba won for Luther (2011)

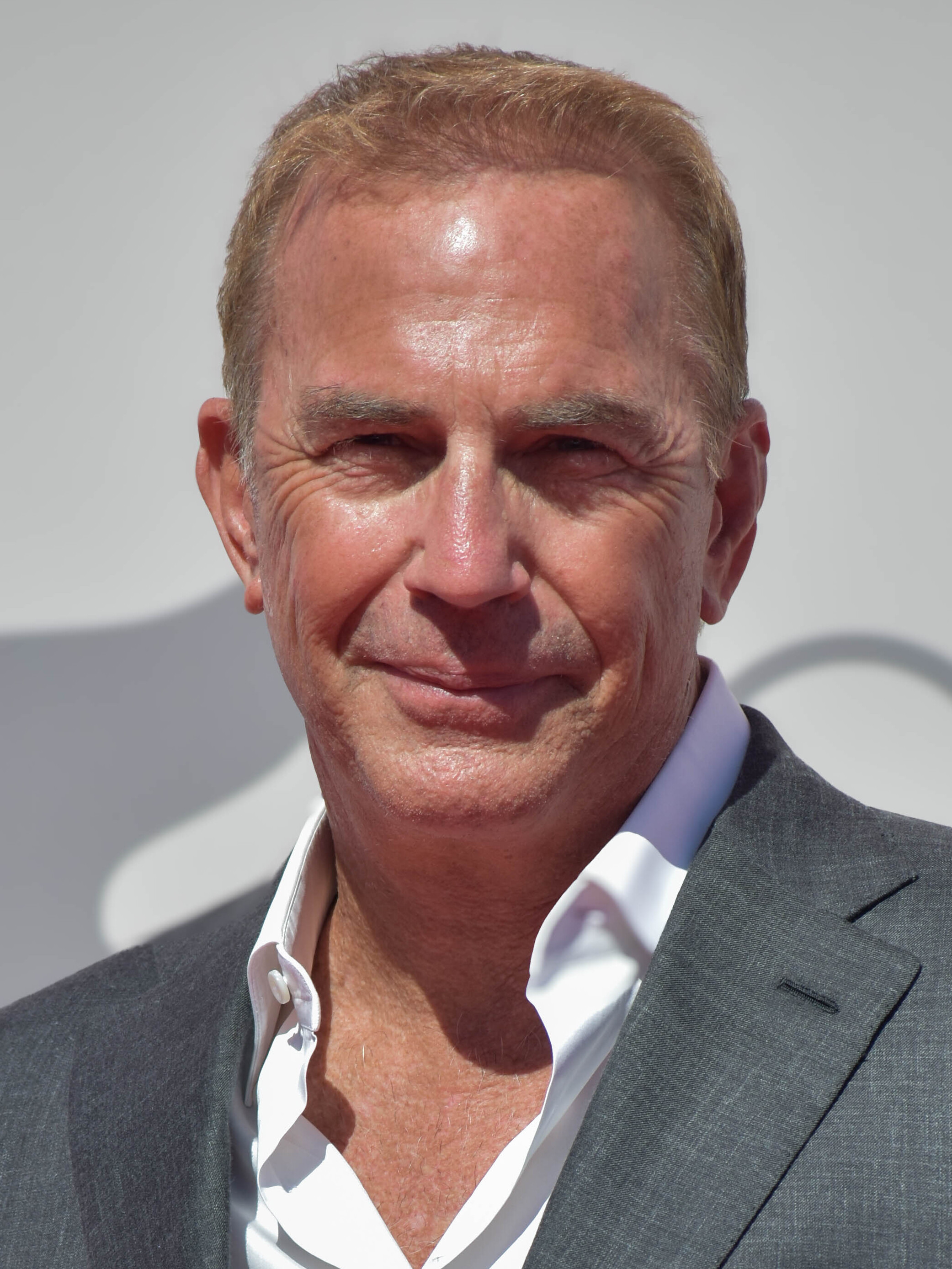
Kevin Costner won for Hatfields & McCoys (2012)

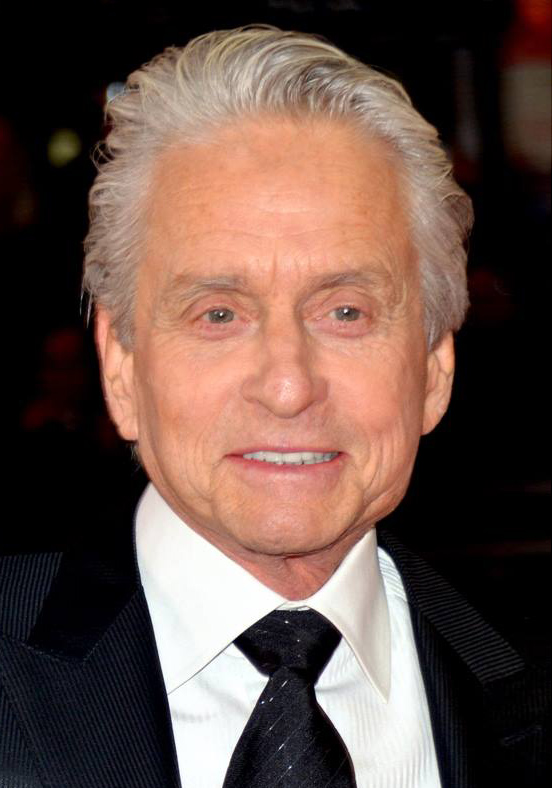
Michael Douglas won for Behind the Candelabra (2013)

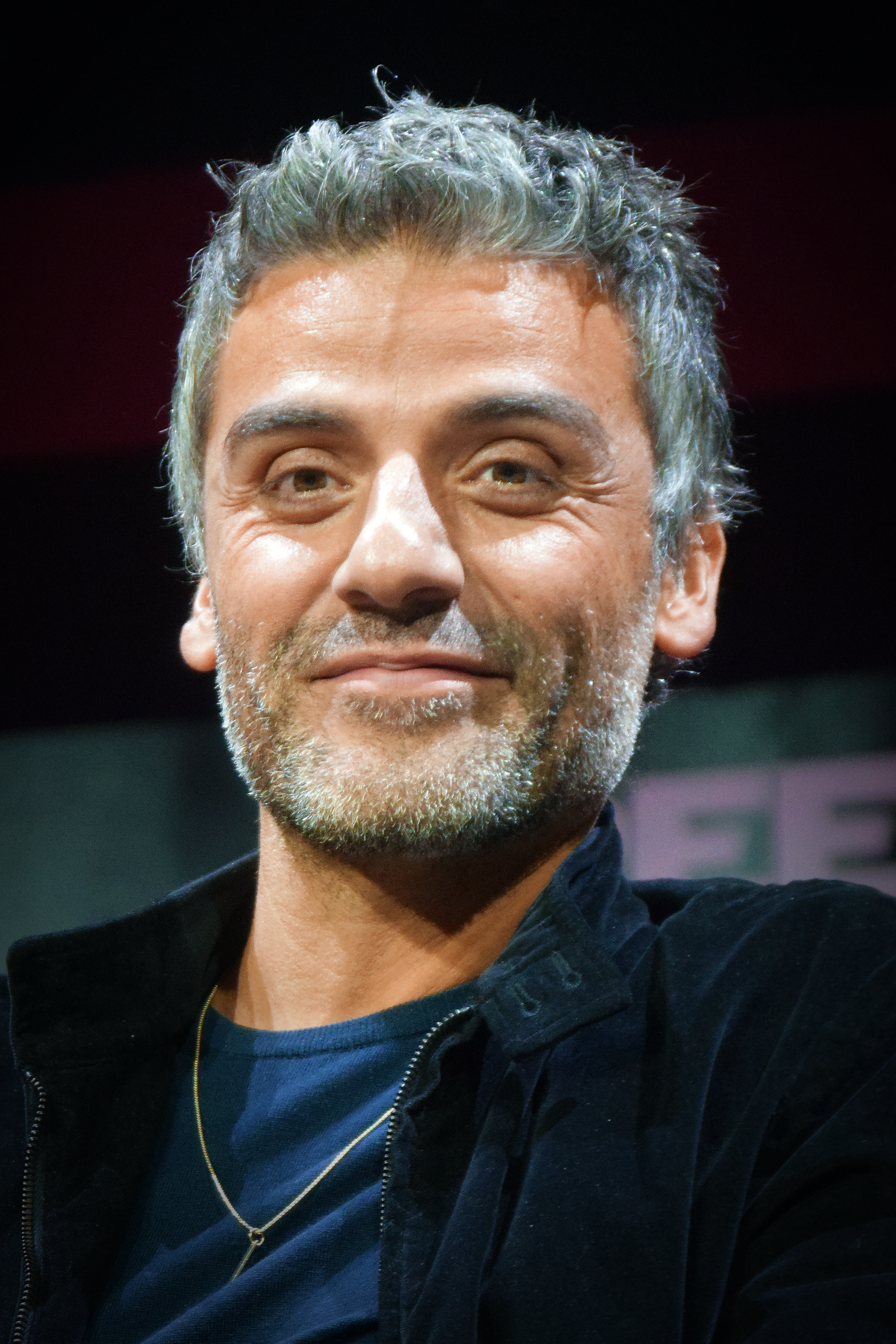
Oscar Isaac won for playing Nick Wasicsko in Show Me a Hero.

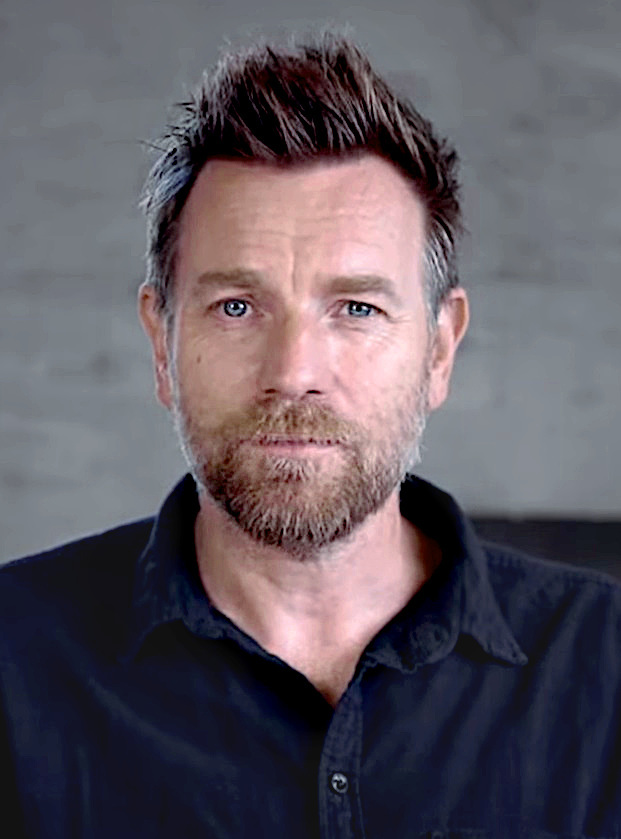
Ewan McGregor won for his dual role in Fargo.

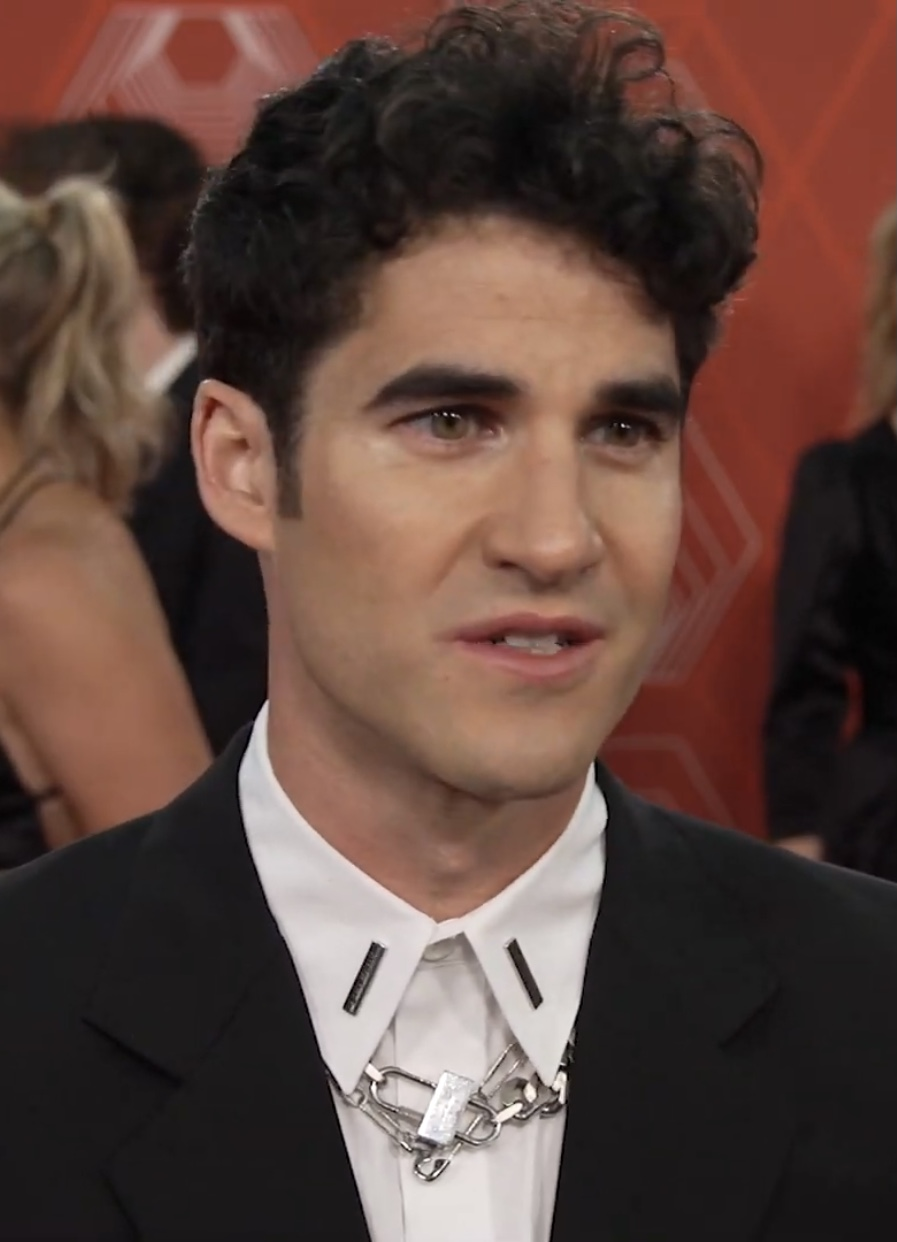
Darren Criss won for The Assassination of Gianni Versace: American Crime Story (2018).

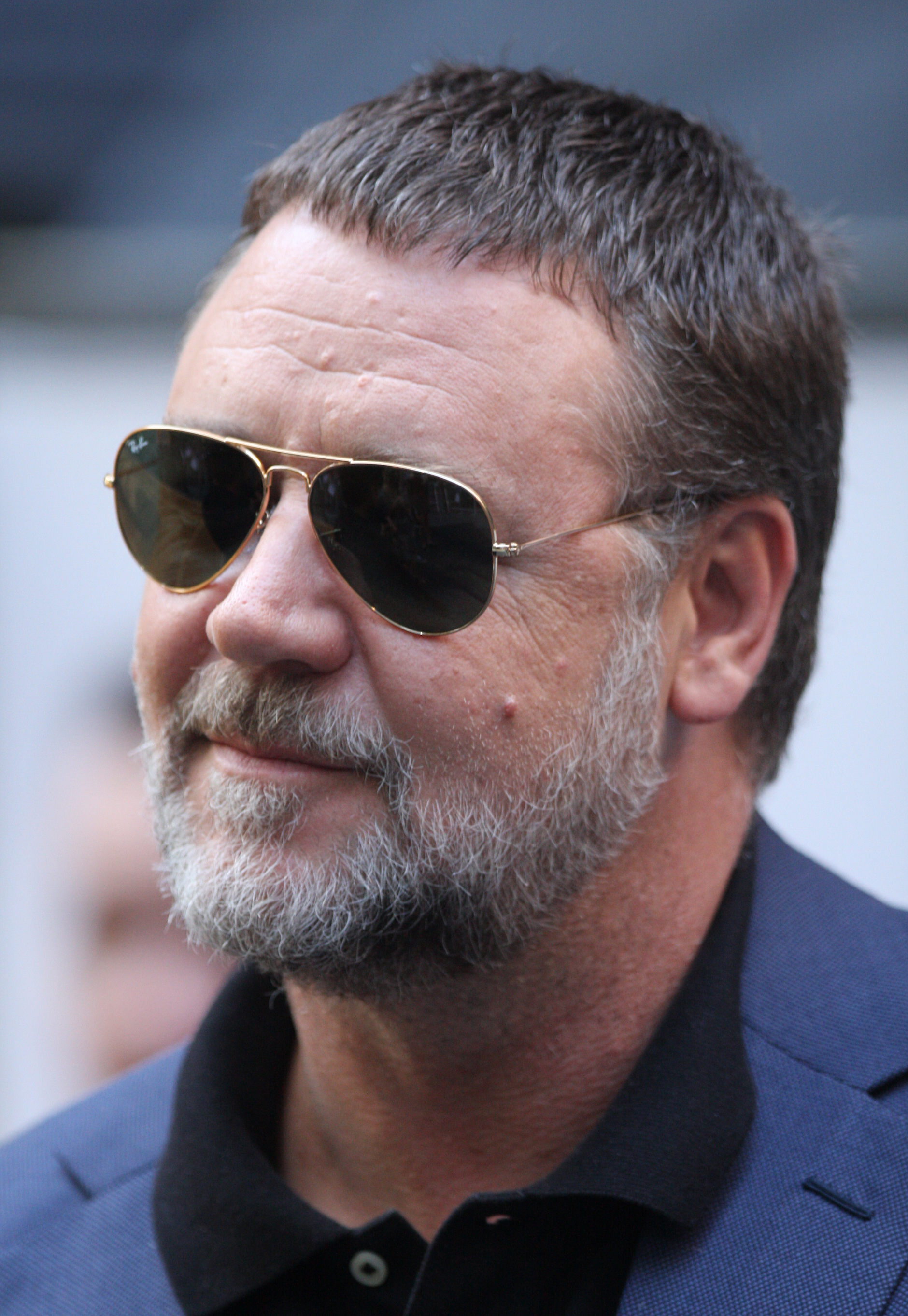
Russell Crowe won for The Loudest Voice (2019)

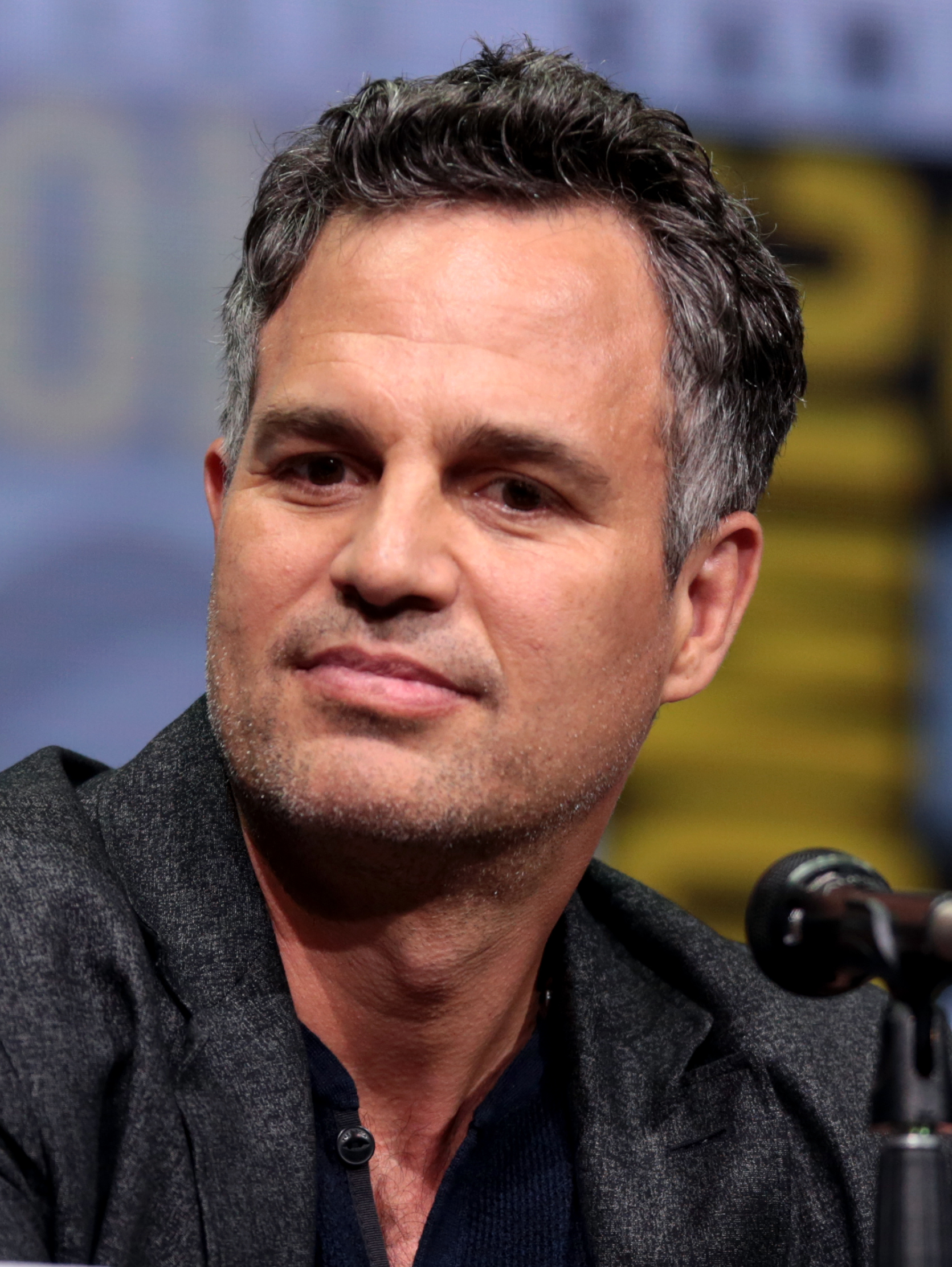
Mark Ruffalo won for I Know This Much Is True (2020).

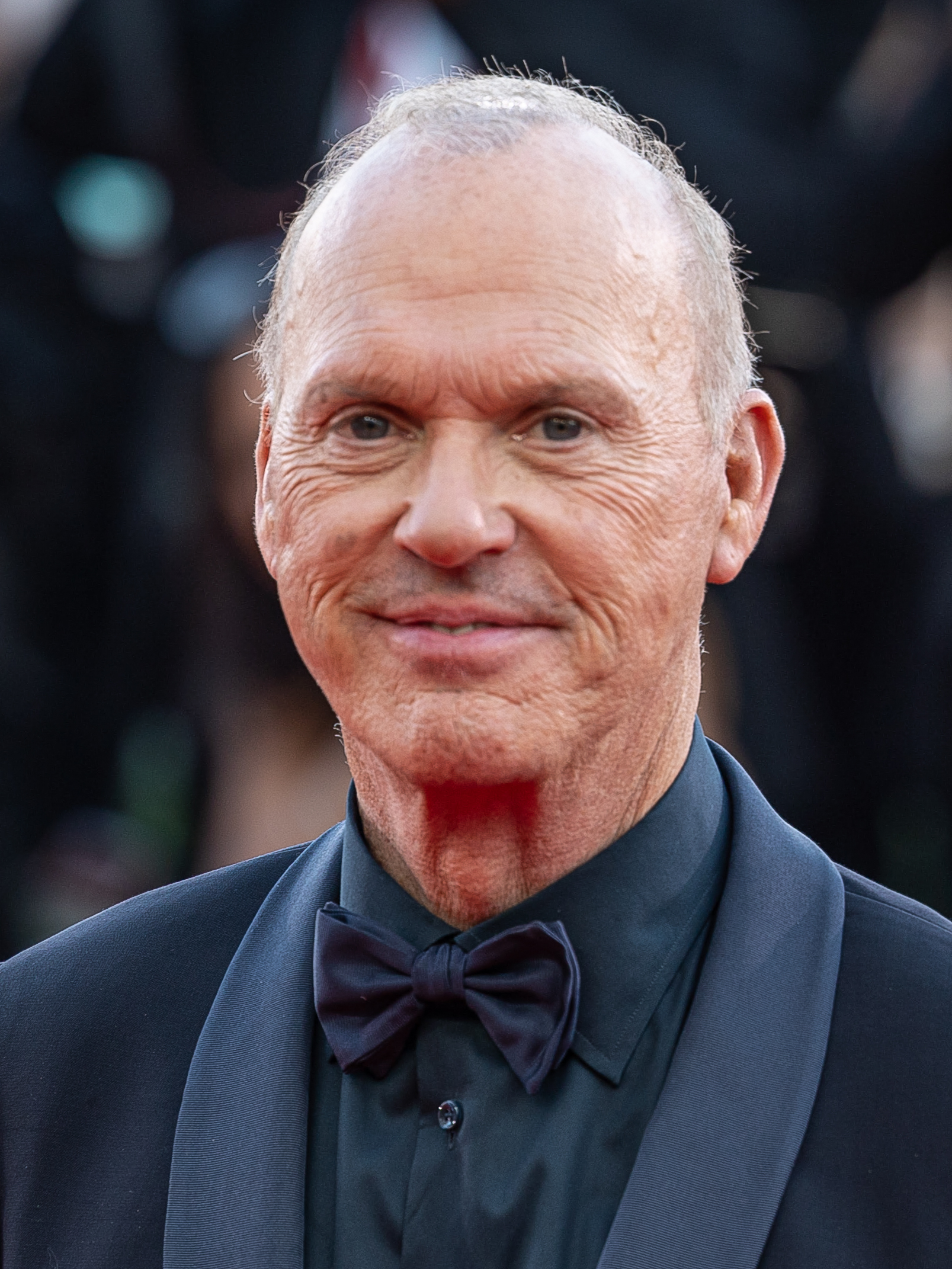
Michael Keaton won for Dopesick (2021)

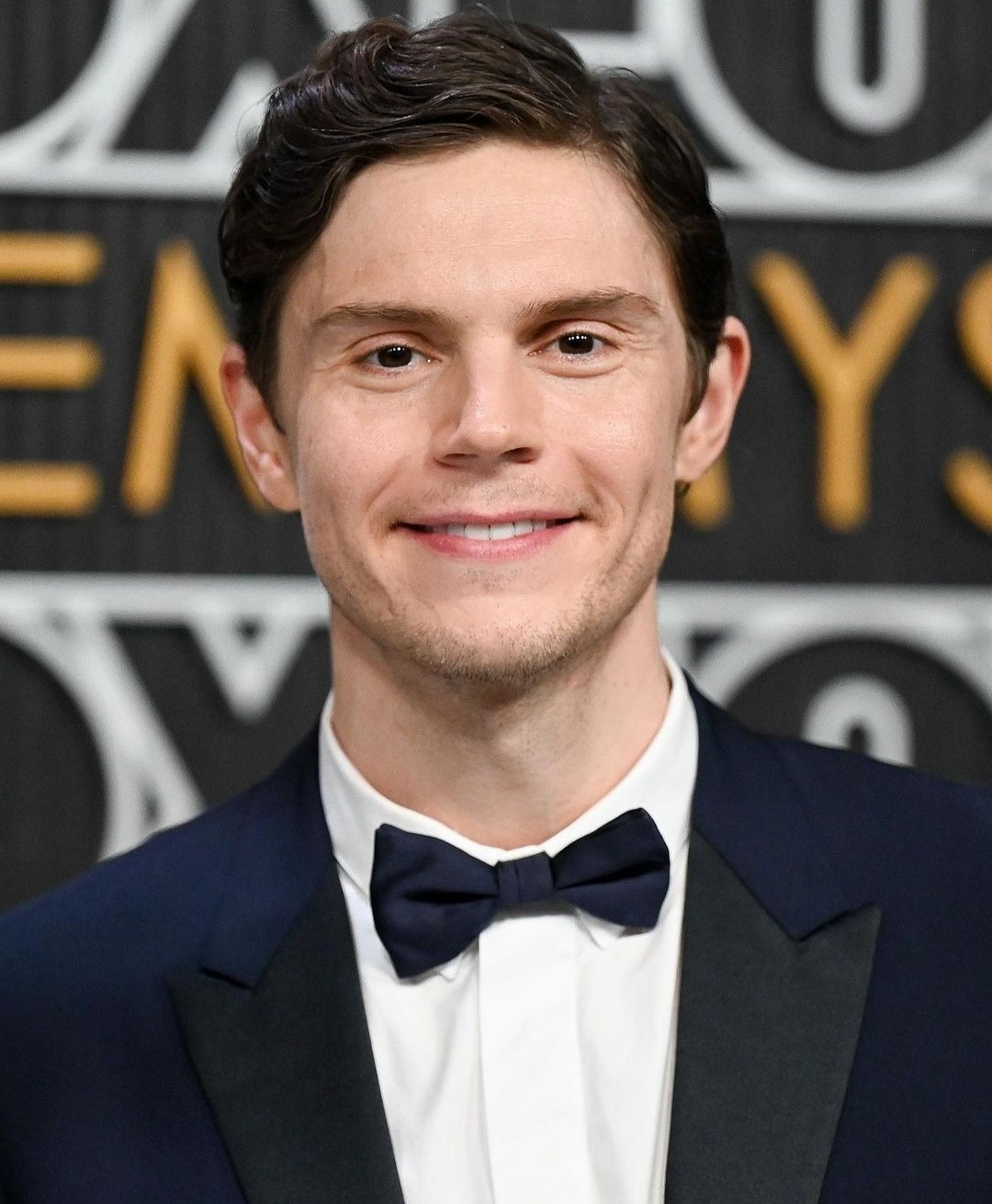
Evan Peters won for Dahmer – Monster: The Jeffrey Dahmer Story (2022).

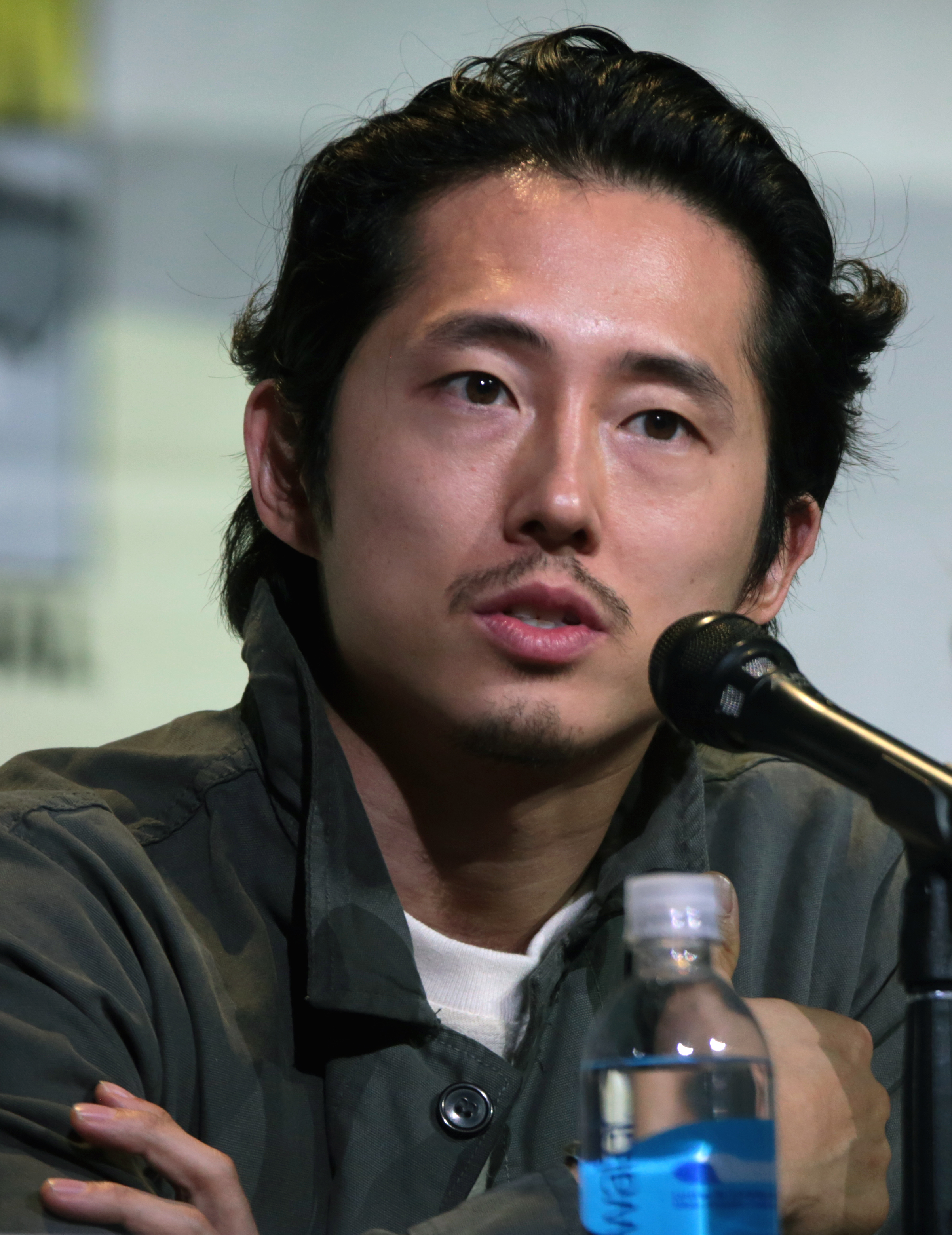
Steven Yeun won for Beef (2023).

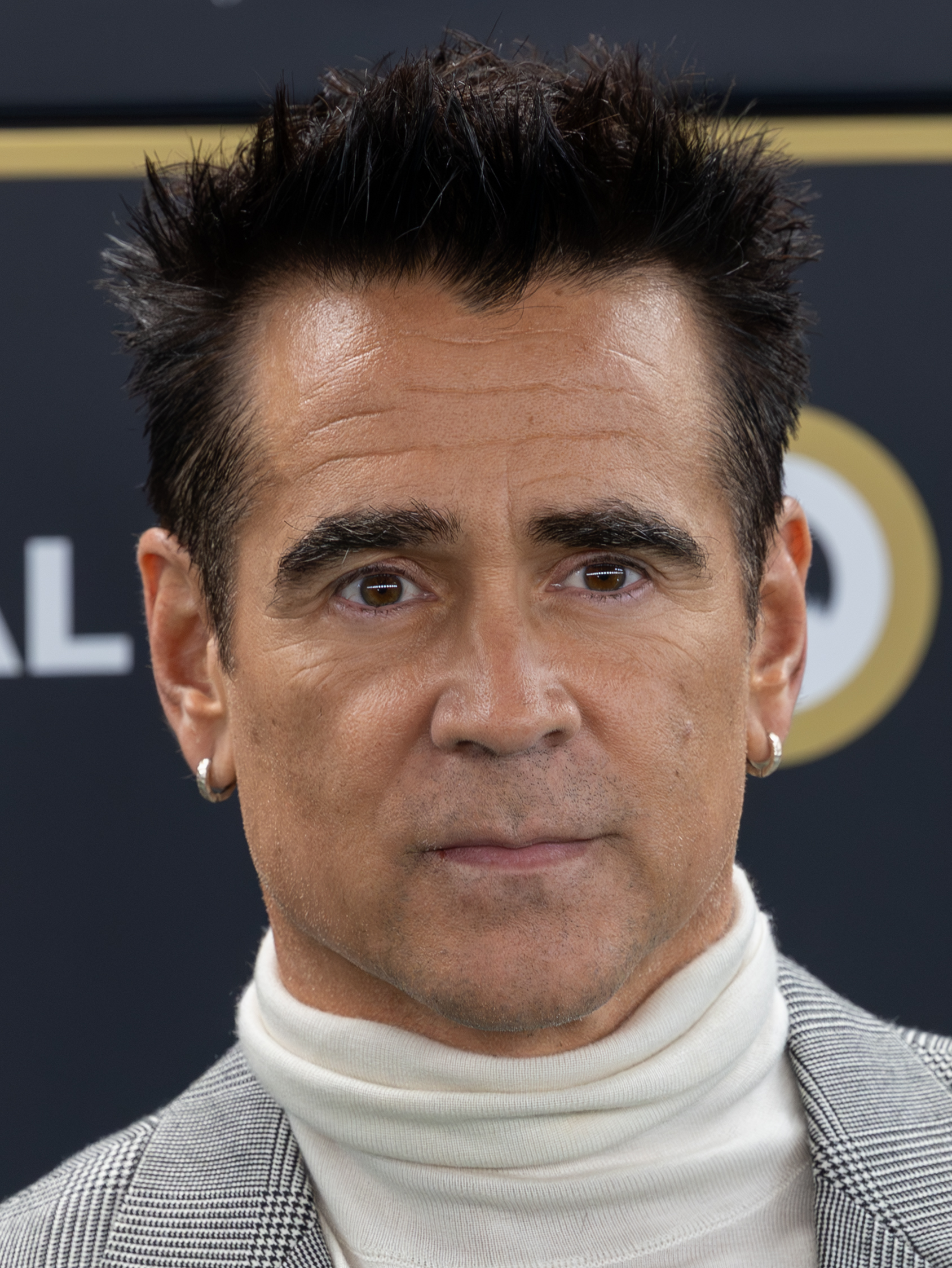
Colin Farrell won for The Penguin (2024).

Listed below are the winners of the award for each year, as well as the other nominees.

| Key | Meaning |
|---|---|
| ‡ | Indicates the winning actor. |

=== 1980s ===
| Year | Actor | Role | Program | Network | Ref |
|---|---|---|---|---|---|
1981 (39th)
| 1981 (39th) | Mickey Rooney ‡ | Bill Sackter | Bill | CBS | |
| 1981 (39th) | Dirk Bogarde | Roald Dahl | The Patricia Neal Story | CBS | |
| 1981 (39th) | Timothy Hutton | Donald Branch Booth | A Long Way Home | ABC | |
| 1981 (39th) | Danny Kaye | Max Feldman | Skokie | CBS | |
| 1981 (39th) | Peter O'Toole | Lucius Flavius Silva | Masada | ABC | |
| 1981 (39th) | Ray Sharkey | Bill Carney | The Ordeal of Bill Carney | CBS | |
| 1981 (39th) | Peter Strauss | Eleazar Ben Yair | Masada | ABC | |
1982 (40th)
| 1982 (40th) | Anthony Andrews ‡ | Sebastian Flyte | Brideshead Revisited | PBS | |
| 1982 (40th) | Philip Anglim | John Merrick | The Elephant Man | ABC | |
| 1982 (40th) | Robby Benson | Nolie Minor | Two of a Kind | CBS | |
| 1982 (40th) | Jeremy Irons | Charles Ryder | Brideshead Revisited | PBS | |
| 1982 (40th) | Sam Waterston | J. Robert Oppenheimer | Oppenheimer | PBS | |
1983 (41st)
| 1983 (41st) | Richard Chamberlain ‡ | Ralph de Bricassart | The Thorn Birds | ABC | |
| 1983 (41st) | Robert Blake | James R. Hoffa | Blood Feud | Syndicated | |
| 1983 (41st) | Louis Gossett Jr. | Anwar al-Sadat | Sadat | OPT | |
| 1983 (41st) | Martin Sheen | John F. Kennedy | Kennedy | NBC | |
| 1983 (41st) | Peter Strauss | Emory | Heart of Steel | ABC | |
1984 (42nd)
| 1984 (42nd) | Ted Danson ‡ | Steven Bennett | Something About Amelia | ABC | |
| 1984 (42nd) | James Garner | Harold Lear | Heartsounds | ABC | |
| 1984 (42nd) | Sam Neill | Sidney Reilly | Reilly, Ace of Spies | PBS | |
| 1984 (42nd) | Jason Robards | Andrei Sakharov | Sakharov | HBO | |
| 1984 (42nd) | Treat Williams | Stanley Kowalski | A Streetcar Named Desire | ABC | |
1985 (43rd)
| 1985 (43rd) | Dustin Hoffman ‡ | Willy Loman | Death of a Salesman | CBS | |
| 1985 (43rd) | Richard Chamberlain | Raoul Wallenberg | Wallenberg: A Hero's Story | NBC | |
| 1985 (43rd) | Richard Crenna | Richard Beck | The Rape of Richard Beck | ABC | |
| 1985 (43rd) | Kirk Douglas | Amos Lasher | Amos | CBS | |
| 1985 (43rd) | Peter Strauss | Abel Rosnovski | Kane and Abel | CBS | |
1986 (44th)
| 1986 (44th) | James Woods ‡ | D.J. | Promise | CBS | |
| 1986 (44th) | James Garner | Bob Buehler | Promise | CBS | |
| 1986 (44th) | Mark Harmon | Ted Bundy | The Deliberate Stranger | NBC | |
| 1986 (44th) | Jan Niklas | Peter the Great | Peter the Great | NBC | |
| 1986 (44th) | John Ritter | Frank Coleman | Unnatural Causes | NBC | |
1987 (45th)
| 1987 (45th) | Randy Quaid ‡ | Lyndon B. Johnson | LBJ: The Early Years | NBC | |
| 1987 (45th) | Alan Arkin | Leon Feldhendler | Escape from Sobibor | CBS | |
| 1987 (45th) | Mark Harmon | Elmer Jackson | After the Promise | CBS | |
| 1987 (45th) | Jack Lemmon | James Tyrone | Long Day's Journey into Night | Showtime | |
| 1987 (45th) | Judd Nelson | Joe Hunt | Billionaire Boys Club | NBC | |
| 1987 (45th) | James Woods | James Stockdale | In Love and War | NBC | |
1988 (46th)
| 1988 (46th) | Michael Caine ‡ | Frederick Abberline | Jack the Ripper | CBS | |
| 1988 (46th) | Stacy Keach ‡ | Ernest Hemingway | Hemingway | Syndicated | |
| 1988 (46th) | Richard Chamberlain | Jason Bourne | The Bourne Identity | ABC | |
| 1988 (46th) | Anthony Hopkins | Chavel | The Tenth Man | CBS | |
| 1988 (46th) | Jack Lemmon | John M. Slaton | The Murder of Mary Phagan | NBC | |
1989 (47th)
| 1989 (47th) | Robert Duvall ‡ | Captain Augustus "Gus" McCrae | Lonesome Dove | CBS | |
| 1989 (47th) | John Gielgud | Aaron Jastrow | War and Remembrance | ABC | |
| 1989 (47th) | Ben Kingsley | Simon Wiesenthal | Murderers Among Us: The Simon Wiesenthal Story | HBO | |
| 1989 (47th) | Lane Smith | Richard Nixon | The Final Days | ABC | |
| 1989 (47th) | James Woods | Bill Wilson | My Name Is Bill W. | CBS | |

=== 1990s ===
| Year | Actor | Role | Program | Network | Ref |
|---|---|---|---|---|---|
1990 (48th)
| 1990 (48th) | James Garner ‡ | Albert Sidney Finch | Decoration Day | NBC | |
| 1990 (48th) | Steven Bauer | Enrique "Kiki" Camarena | Drug Wars: The Camarena Story | NBC | |
| 1990 (48th) | Michael Caine | Dr. Henry Jekyll / Harry Hyde | Jekyll & Hyde | ABC | |
| 1990 (48th) | Tom Hulce | Michael Schwerner | Murder in Mississippi | NBC | |
| 1990 (48th) | Burt Lancaster | Gerard Carriere | The Phantom of the Opera | NBC | |
| 1990 (48th) | Ricky Schroder | Mark | The Stranger Within | ABC | |
1991 (49th)
| 1991 (49th) | Beau Bridges ‡ | James Brady | Without Warning: The James Brady Story | HBO | |
| 1991 (49th) | Sam Elliott | Conn Conagher | Conagher | TNT | |
| 1991 (49th) | Peter Falk | Columbo | Columbo and the Murder of a Rock Star | ABC | |
| 1991 (49th) | Sam Neill | Major James Leggatt | One Against the Wind | CBS | |
| 1991 (49th) | Sidney Poitier | Thurgood Marshall | Separate but Equal | ABC | |
1992 (50th)
| 1992 (50th) | Robert Duvall ‡ | Joseph Stalin | Stalin | HBO | |
| 1992 (50th) | Anthony Andrews | William Whitfield | Jewels | NBC | |
| 1992 (50th) | Philip Casnoff | Frank Sinatra | Sinatra | CBS | |
| 1992 (50th) | Jon Voight | Professor Alfred Kroeber | The Last of His Tribe | HBO | |
| 1992 (50th) | James Woods | Roy Cohn | Citizen Cohn | HBO | |
1993 (51st)
| 1993 (51st) | James Garner ‡ | F. Ross Johnson | Barbarians at the Gate | HBO | |
| 1993 (51st) | Peter Falk | Columbo | Columbo: Its All in the Game | ABC | |
| 1993 (51st) | Jack Lemmon | Robert | A Life in the Theatre | TNT | |
| 1993 (51st) | Matthew Modine | Dr. Don Francis | And the Band Played On | HBO | |
| 1993 (51st) | Peter Strauss | Ed MacAffrey | Men Don't Tell | CBS | |
1994 (52nd)
| 1994 (52nd) | Raúl Juliá ‡ | Chico Mendes | The Burning Season | HBO | |
| 1994 (52nd) | Alan Alda | Dan Cutler | White Mile | HBO | |
| 1994 (52nd) | James Garner | Ira Moran | Breathing Lessons | CBS | |
| 1994 (52nd) | Rutger Hauer | Xavier March | Fatherland | HBO | |
| 1994 (52nd) | Samuel L. Jackson | Jamaal | Against the Wall | HBO | |
1995 (53rd)
| 1995 (53rd) | Gary Sinise ‡ | Harry S. Truman | Truman | HBO | |
| 1995 (53rd) | Alec Baldwin | Stanley Kowalski | A Streetcar Named Desire | CBS | |
| 1995 (53rd) | Charles S. Dutton | Boy Willie Charles | The Piano Lesson | CBS | |
| 1995 (53rd) | Laurence Fishburne | Capt. Hannibal "Iowa" Lee, Jr. | The Tuskegee Airmen | HBO | |
| 1995 (53rd) | James Woods | Danny Davis | Indictment: The McMartin Trial | HBO | |
1996 (54th)
| 1996 (54th) | Alan Rickman ‡ | Grigori Rasputin | Rasputin: Dark Servant of Destiny | HBO | |
| 1996 (54th) | Armand Assante | John Gotti | Gotti | HBO | |
| 1996 (54th) | Beau Bridges | Richard Phillips | Losing Chase | Showtime | |
| 1996 (54th) | Stephen Rea | Bruno Hauptman | Crime of the Century | HBO | |
| 1996 (54th) | James Woods | Temple Rayburn | The Summer of Ben Tyler | CBS | |
1997 (55th)
| 1997 (55th) | Ving Rhames ‡ | Don King | Don King: Only in America | HBO | |
| 1997 (55th) | Armand Assante | Ulysses | The Odyssey | NBC | |
| 1997 (55th) | Jack Lemmon | Juror #8 | 12 Angry Men | Showtime | |
| 1997 (55th) | Matthew Modine | Sammy Ayres | What the Deaf Man Heard | CBS | |
| 1997 (55th) | Gary Sinise | George C. Wallace | George Wallace | TNT | |
1998 (56th)
| 1998 (56th) | Stanley Tucci ‡ | Walter Winchell | Winchell | HBO | |
| 1998 (56th) | Peter Fonda | Gideon Prosper | The Tempest | NBC | |
| 1998 (56th) | Sam Neill | Merlin | Merlin | NBC | |
| 1998 (56th) | Bill Paxton | John Paul Vann | A Bright Shining Lie | HBO | |
| 1998 (56th) | Christopher Reeve | Jason Kemp | Rear Window | ABC | |
| 1998 (56th) | Patrick Stewart | Captain Ahab | Moby Dick | USA | |
1999 (57th)
| 1999 (57th) | Jack Lemmon ‡ | Henry Drummond | Inherit the Wind | Showtime | |
| 1999 (57th) | Jack Lemmon | Morrie Schwartz | Tuesdays with Morrie | ABC | |
| 1999 (57th) | Liev Schreiber | Orson Welles | RKO 281 | HBO | |
| 1999 (57th) | Sam Shepard | Dashiell Hammett | Dash and Lilly | A&E | |
| 1999 (57th) | Tom Sizemore | Bobby Batton | Witness Protection | HBO | |

=== 2000s ===
| Year | Actor | Role | Program | Network | Ref |
|---|---|---|---|---|---|
2000 (58th)
| 2000 (58th) | Brian Dennehy ‡ | Willy Loman | Death of a Salesman | Showtime | |
| 2000 (58th) | Alec Baldwin | Robert H. Jackson | Nuremberg | TNT | |
| 2000 (58th) | Brian Cox | Hermann Göring | Nuremberg | TNT | |
| 2000 (58th) | Andy García | Arturo Sandoval | For Love or Country: The Arturo Sandoval Story | HBO | |
| 2000 (58th) | James Woods | Dennis Barrie | Dirty Pictures | Showtime | |
2001 (59th)
| 2001 (59th) | James Franco ‡ | James Dean | James Dean | TNT | |
| 2001 (59th) | Kenneth Branagh | Reinhard Heydrich | Conspiracy | HBO | |
| 2001 (59th) | Ben Kingsley | Otto Frank | Anne Frank: The Whole Story | ABC | |
| 2001 (59th) | Damian Lewis | Richard Winters | Band of Brothers | HBO | |
| 2001 (59th) | Barry Pepper | Roger Maris | 61* | HBO | |
2002 (60th)
| 2002 (60th) | Albert Finney ‡ | Winston Churchill | The Gathering Storm | HBO | |
| 2002 (60th) | Michael Gambon | Lyndon B. Johnson | Path to War | HBO | |
| 2002 (60th) | Michael Keaton | Robert Wiener | Live from Baghdad | HBO | |
| 2002 (60th) | William H. Macy | Bill Porter | Door to Door | TNT | |
| 2002 (60th) | Linus Roache | Robert F. Kennedy | RFK | FX | |
2003 (61st)
| 2003 (61st) | Al Pacino ‡ | Roy Cohn | Angels in America | HBO | |
| 2003 (61st) | Antonio Banderas | Pancho Villa | And Starring Pancho Villa as Himself | HBO | |
| 2003 (61st) | James Brolin | Ronald Reagan | The Reagans | Showtime | |
| 2003 (61st) | Troy Garity | Barry Winchell | Soldier's Girl | Showtime | |
| 2003 (61st) | Tom Wilkinson | Ruth Applewood | Normal | HBO | |
2004 (62nd)
| 2004 (62nd) | Geoffrey Rush ‡ | Peter Sellers | The Life and Death of Peter Sellers | HBO | |
| 2004 (62nd) | Mos Def | Vivien Thomas | Something the Lord Made | HBO | |
| 2004 (62nd) | Jamie Foxx | Stanley Tookie Williams | Redemption: The Stan Tookie Williams Story | FX | |
| 2004 (62nd) | William H. Macy | Gigot | The Wool Cap | TNT | |
| 2004 (62nd) | Patrick Stewart | King Henry II | The Lion in Winter | Showtime | |
2005 (63rd)
| 2005 (63rd) | Jonathan Rhys Meyers ‡ | Elvis Presley | Elvis | CBS | |
| 2005 (63rd) | Kenneth Branagh | Franklin D. Roosevelt | Warm Springs | HBO | |
| 2005 (63rd) | Ed Harris | Miles Roby | Empire Falls | HBO | |
| 2005 (63rd) | Bill Nighy | Lawrence | The Girl in the Café | HBO | |
| 2005 (63rd) | Donald Sutherland | Bill Meehan | Human Trafficking | Lifetime | |
2006 (64th)
| 2006 (64th) | Bill Nighy ‡ | Gideon Warner | Gideon's Daughter | BBC America | |
| 2006 (64th) | Andre Braugher | Nick Atwaler | Thief | FX | |
| 2006 (64th) | Robert Duvall | Prentice "Print" Ritter | Broken Trail | AMC | |
| 2006 (64th) | Michael Ealy | Darwyn al-Sayeed | Sleeper Cell | Showtime | |
| 2006 (64th) | Chiwetel Ejiofor | Ian Carter | Tsunami: The Aftermath | HBO | |
| 2006 (64th) | Ben Kingsley | Herman Tarnower | Mrs. Harris | HBO | |
| 2006 (64th) | Matthew Perry | Ron Clark | The Ron Clark Story | TNT | |
2007 (65th)
| 2007 (65th) | Jim Broadbent ‡ | Lord Longford | Longford | HBO | |
| 2007 (65th) | Adam Beach | Charles Eastman | Bury My Heart at Wounded Knee | HBO | |
| 2007 (65th) | Ernest Borgnine | Bert O'Riley | A Grandpa for Christmas | Hallmark Channel | |
| 2007 (65th) | Jason Isaacs | Sir Mark Brydon | The State Within | BBC America | |
| 2007 (65th) | James Nesbitt | Doctor Tom Jackman / Mr. Hyde | Jekyll | BBC America | |
2008 (66th)
| 2008 (66th) | Paul Giamatti ‡ | John Adams | John Adams | HBO | |
| 2008 (66th) | Ralph Fiennes | Bernard Lafferty | Bernard and Doris | HBO | |
| 2008 (66th) | Kevin Spacey | Ron Klain | Recount | HBO | |
| 2008 (66th) | Kiefer Sutherland | Jack Bauer | 24: Redemption | Fox | |
| 2008 (66th) | Tom Wilkinson | James Baker | Recount | HBO | |
2009 (67th)
| 2009 (67th) | Kevin Bacon ‡ | Michael Strobl | Taking Chance | HBO | |
| 2009 (67th) | Kenneth Branagh | Kurt Wallander | Wallander: One Step Behind | PBS | |
| 2009 (67th) | Chiwetel Ejiofor | Thabo Mbeki | Endgame | PBS | |
| 2009 (67th) | Brendan Gleeson | Winston Churchill | Into the Storm | HBO | |
| 2009 (67th) | Jeremy Irons | Alfred Stieglitz | Georgia O'Keeffe | Lifetime | |

=== 2010s ===
| Year | Actor | Role | Program | Network | Ref |
|---|---|---|---|---|---|
2010 (68th)
| 2010 (68th) | Al Pacino ‡ | Jack Kevorkian | You Don't Know Jack | HBO | |
| 2010 (68th) | Idris Elba | DCI John Luther | Luther | BBC America | |
| 2010 (68th) | Ian McShane | Waleran Bigod | The Pillars of the Earth | Starz | |
| 2010 (68th) | Dennis Quaid | Bill Clinton | The Special Relationship | HBO | |
| 2010 (68th) | Édgar Ramírez | Ilich Ramírez Sánchez | Carlos | Sundance Channel | |
2011 (69th)
| 2011 (69th) | Idris Elba ‡ | DCI John Luther | Luther | BBC America | |
| 2011 (69th) | Hugh Bonneville | Robert, Earl of Grantham | Downton Abbey | PBS | |
| 2011 (69th) | William Hurt | Henry Paulson | Too Big to Fail | HBO | |
| 2011 (69th) | Bill Nighy | Johnny Worricker | Page Eight | PBS | |
| 2011 (69th) | Dominic West | Hector Madden | The Hour | BBC America | |
2012 (70th)
| 2012 (70th) | Kevin Costner ‡ | Devil Anse Hatfield | Hatfields & McCoys | History | |
| 2012 (70th) | Benedict Cumberbatch | Sherlock Holmes | Sherlock | PBS | |
| 2012 (70th) | Woody Harrelson | Steve Schmidt | Game Change | HBO | |
| 2012 (70th) | Toby Jones | Alfred Hitchcock | The Girl | HBO | |
| 2012 (70th) | Clive Owen | Ernest Hemingway | Hemingway & Gellhorn | HBO | |
2013 (71st)
| 2013 (71st) | Michael Douglas ‡ | Liberace | Behind the Candelabra | HBO | |
| 2013 (71st) | Matt Damon | Scott Thorson | Behind the Candelabra | HBO | |
| 2013 (71st) | Chiwetel Ejiofor | Louis Lester | Dancing on the Edge | Starz | |
| 2013 (71st) | Idris Elba | DCI John Luther | Luther | BBC America | |
| 2013 (71st) | Al Pacino | Phil Spector | Phil Spector | HBO | |
2014 (72nd)
| 2014 (72nd) | Billy Bob Thornton ‡ | Lorne Malvo | Fargo | FX | |
| 2014 (72nd) | Martin Freeman | Lester Nygaard | Fargo | FX | |
| 2014 (72nd) | Woody Harrelson | Detective Martin Hart | True Detective | HBO | |
| 2014 (72nd) | Matthew McConaughey | Detective Rust Cohle | True Detective | HBO | |
| 2014 (72nd) | Mark Ruffalo | Ned Weeks | The Normal Heart | HBO | |
2015 (73rd)
| 2015 (73rd) | Oscar Isaac ‡ | Nick Wasicsko | Show Me a Hero | HBO | |
| 2015 (73rd) | Idris Elba | DCI John Luther | Luther | BBC America | |
| 2015 (73rd) | David Oyelowo | Peter Snowden | Nightingale | HBO | |
| 2015 (73rd) | Mark Rylance | Thomas Cromwell | Wolf Hall | PBS | |
| 2015 (73rd) | Patrick Wilson | State Trouper Lou Solverson | Fargo | FX | |
2016 (74th)
| 2016 (74th) | Tom Hiddleston ‡ | Jonathan Pine | The Night Manager | AMC | |
| 2016 (74th) | Riz Ahmed | Nasir "Naz" Khan | The Night Of | HBO | |
| 2016 (74th) | Bryan Cranston | Lyndon B. Johnson | All the Way | HBO | |
| 2016 (74th) | John Turturro | John Stone | The Night Of | HBO | |
| 2016 (74th) | Courtney B. Vance | Johnnie Cochran | The People v. O. J. Simpson: American Crime Story | FX | |
2017 (75th)
| 2017 (75th) | Ewan McGregor ‡ | Emmit and Raymond "Ray" Stussy | Fargo | FX | |
| 2017 (75th) | Robert De Niro | Bernard "Bernie" Madoff | The Wizard of Lies | HBO | |
| 2017 (75th) | Jude Law | Pope Pius XIII | The Young Pope | HBO | |
| 2017 (75th) | Kyle MacLachlan | Dale Cooper, Cooper's Double, Douglas "Dougie" Jones | Twin Peaks | Showtime | |
| 2017 (75th) | Geoffrey Rush | Albert Einstein | Genius: Einstein | Nat Geo | |
2018 (76th)
| 2018 (76th) | Darren Criss ‡ | Andrew Cunanan | The Assassination of Gianni Versace: American Crime Story | FX | |
| 2018 (76th) | Antonio Banderas | Pablo Picasso | Genius: Picasso | Nat Geo | |
| 2018 (76th) | Daniel Brühl | Dr. Lazlo Kreizler | The Alienist | TNT | |
| 2018 (76th) | Benedict Cumberbatch | Patrick Melrose | Patrick Melrose | Showtime | |
| 2018 (76th) | Hugh Grant | Jeremy Thorpe | A Very English Scandal | Amazon | |
2019 (77th)
| 2019 (77th) | Russell Crowe ‡ | Roger Ailes | The Loudest Voice | Showtime | |
| 2019 (77th) | Christopher Abbott | Capt. John Yossarian | Catch-22 | Hulu | |
| 2019 (77th) | Sacha Baron Cohen | Eli Cohen / Kamel Amin Thaabet | The Spy | Netflix | |
| 2019 (77th) | Jared Harris | Valery Legasov | Chernobyl | HBO | |
| 2019 (77th) | Sam Rockwell | Bob Fosse | Fosse/Verdon | FX | |

=== 2020s ===
| Year | Actor | Role | Program | Network | Ref |
|---|---|---|---|---|---|
2020 (78th)
| 2020 (78th) | Mark Ruffalo ‡ | Dominick and Thomas Birdsey | I Know This Much Is True | HBO | |
| 2020 (78th) | Bryan Cranston | Michael Desiato | Your Honor | Showtime | |
| 2020 (78th) | Jeff Daniels | James Comey | The Comey Rule | Showtime | |
| 2020 (78th) | Hugh Grant | Jonathan Fraser | The Undoing | HBO | |
| 2020 (78th) | Ethan Hawke | John Brown | The Good Lord Bird | Showtime | |
2021 (79th)
| 2021 (79th) | Michael Keaton ‡ | Samuel Finnix | Dopesick | Hulu | |
| 2021 (79th) | Paul Bettany | Vision | WandaVision | Disney+ | |
| 2021 (79th) | Oscar Isaac | Jonathan Levy | Scenes from a Marriage | HBO | |
| 2021 (79th) | Ewan McGregor | Halston | Halston | Netflix | |
| 2021 (79th) | Tahar Rahim | Charles Sobhraj | The Serpent | Netflix | |
2022 (80th)
| 2022 (80th) | Evan Peters ‡ | Jeffrey Dahmer | Dahmer – Monster: The Jeffrey Dahmer Story | Netflix | |
| 2022 (80th) | Taron Egerton | James "Jimmy" Keene Jr. | Black Bird | Apple TV+ | |
| 2022 (80th) | Colin Firth | Michael Peterson | The Staircase | HBO Max | |
| 2022 (80th) | Andrew Garfield | Detective Jeb Pyre | Under the Banner of Heaven | Hulu | |
| 2022 (80th) | Sebastian Stan | Tommy Lee | Pam & Tommy | Hulu | |
2023 (81st)
| 2023 (81st) | Steven Yeun ‡ | Daniel "Danny" Cho | Beef | Netflix | |
| 2023 (81st) | Matt Bomer | Hawkins "Hawk" Fuller | Fellow Travelers | Showtime | |
| 2023 (81st) | Sam Claflin | Billy Dunne | Daisy Jones & the Six | Prime Video | |
| 2023 (81st) | Jon Hamm | Sheriff Roy Tillman | Fargo | FX | |
| 2023 (81st) | Woody Harrelson | E. Howard Hunt | White House Plumbers | HBO | |
| 2023 (81st) | David Oyelowo | Bass Reeves | Lawmen: Bass Reeves | Paramount+ | |
2024 (82nd)
| 2024 (82nd) | Colin Farrell ‡ | Oswald "Oz" Cobb / The Penguin | The Penguin | HBO | |
| 2024 (82nd) | Richard Gadd | Donny Dunn | Baby Reindeer | Netflix | |
| 2024 (82nd) | Kevin Kline | Stephen Brigstocke | Disclaimer | Apple TV+ | |
| 2024 (82nd) | Cooper Koch | Erik Menendez | Monsters: The Lyle and Erik Menendez Story | Netflix | |
| 2024 (82nd) | Ewan McGregor | Count Alexander Ilyich Rostov | A Gentleman in Moscow | Paramount+ | |
| 2024 (82nd) | Andrew Scott | Thomas "Tom" Ripley | Ripley | Netflix | |
2025 (83rd)
| 2025 (83rd) | Stephen Graham ‡ | Eddie Miller | Adolescence | Netflix | |
| 2025 (83rd) | Jacob Elordi | Dorrigo Evans | The Narrow Road to the Deep North | Prime Video | |
| 2025 (83rd) | Paul Giamatti | Phillip Connarty | Black Mirror | Netflix | |
| 2025 (83rd) | Charlie Hunnam | Ed Gein | Monster: The Ed Gein Story | Netflix | |
| 2025 (83rd) | Jude Law | Jake Friedkin | Black Rabbit | Netflix | |
| 2025 (83rd) | Matthew Rhys | Nile Jarvis | The Beast in Me | Netflix | |

== Superlatives ==
=== Multiple wins ===
| Wins | Name |
|---|---|
| 2 | Robert Duvall |
| 2 | James Garner |
| 2 | Al Pacino |

=== Multiple nominations ===
| Nominations | Name |
|---|---|
| 7 | James Woods |
| 6 | Jack Lemmon |
| 5 | James Garner |
| 4 | Idris Elba |
| 4 | Peter Strauss |
| 3 | Kenneth Branagh |
| 3 | Richard Chamberlain |
| 3 | Chiwetel Ejiofor |
| 3 | Woody Harrelson |
| 3 | Ben Kingsley |
| 3 | Ewan McGregor |
| 3 | Sam Neill |
| 3 | Bill Nighy |
| 3 | Al Pacino |
| 2 | Anthony Andrews |
| 2 | Armand Assante |
| 2 | Alec Baldwin |
| 2 | Antonio Banderas |
| 2 | Beau Bridges |
| 2 | Michael Caine |
| 2 | Benedict Cumberbatch |
| 2 | Peter Falk |
| 2 | Paul Giamatti |
| 2 | Mark Harmon |
| 2 | Jeremy Irons |
| 2 | Jude Law |
| 2 | William H. Macy |
| 2 | Matthew Modine |
| 2 | David Oyelowo |
| 2 | Geoffrey Rush |
| 2 | Gary Sinise |
| 2 | Patrick Stewart |
| 2 | Tom Wilkinson |

== See also ==
- Actor Award for Outstanding Performance by a Male Actor in a Miniseries or Television Movie
- Critics' Choice Television Award for Best Actor in a Movie/Miniseries
- Primetime Emmy Award for Outstanding Lead Actor in a Limited or Anthology Series or Movie
