= Moloney (TV series) =

- Genre: Crime drama
- Created by: Ronald Bass; Jane Rusconi
- Starring: Peter Strauss; Nestor Serrano; Wendell Pierce; Cherie Lunghi; Giuliana Santini; Ashley Johnson
- Composer: Russ Landau
- Country of origin: United States
- Original language: English
- No. of seasons: 1
- No. of episodes: 21

Production
- Executive producers: Ronald Bass; Stephen Kronish
- Production companies: Predawn Productions; CBS Productions; TriStar Television

Original release
- Network: CBS
- Release: September 19, 1996 – May 22, 1997

Moloney is an American crime drama television program created by Ronald Bass and Jane Rusconi, that aired on CBS from September 19, 1996, to May 22, 1997. The program was cancelled in May 1997 after one season. Reruns continued until July 24, 1997.

== Premise ==
Nicholas "Nick" Moloney (Peter Strauss) is a Los Angeles cop and a licensed psychiatrist. Unlike the department's other staff psychiatrists, Moloney is also a fully commissioned police officer who can make arrests. This provides advantages, but also a considerable conflict of interest. Often, Moloney finds himself unable to use his inside knowledge to enforce the law because to do so would be an unethical breach of doctor–patient privilege.

== Cast ==
- Peter Strauss as Nick Moloney
- Nestor Serrano as Lt. Matty Navarro
- Wendell Pierce as D.A. Cal Patterson
- Cherie Lunghi as Dr. Sarah Bateman
- Giuliana Santini as Det. Angela Vecchio
- Ashley Johnson as Katherine 'Kate' Moloney

== Episodes ==
No.	Title	Directed by	Written by	Original release date
1	"Hard Choices"	Donna Deitch	Stephen Kronish	September 19, 1996
2	"Pilot"	Robert Lieberman	Ron Bass	September 26, 1996
3	"Night of the Gardenia"	Lee Bonner	James Kramer	October 3, 1996
Moloney investigates a serial killer of prostitutes.
4	"Friendly Fire"	Scott Brazil	David Rupel	October 17, 1996
5	"Clueless"	Michael Nankin	Jacquelyn Blain & Clifton Campbell	October 24, 1996
6	"All the King's Horses"	Win Phelps	Clifton Campbell & David Ehrman	October 31, 1996
7	"Sweet Sorrow"	Perry Lang	James Kramer	November 7, 1996
8	"A Matter of Principle"	Martha Mitchell	Jacquelyn Blain	November 14, 1996
9	"Second Sight"	Steve Robman	David Ehrman	November 21, 1996
10	"Nothing But the Truth"	Lee Bonner	Clifton Campbell	December 12, 1996
11	"I'm Ambivalent About L.A."	James Contner	Jennifer Furlong	January 9, 1997
12	"Clarity Begins at Home"	Stephen Cragg	James Kramer	January 16, 1997
13	"Damage Control"	Peter Markle	David Ehrman	January 30, 1997
14	"Herniated Nick"	Jerry Jameson	Jennifer Furlong	February 6, 1997
15	"Misconduct"	Tim Hunter	Clifton Campbell	February 13, 1997
16	"Deep Cover"	Steve Robman	David Ehrman	February 20, 1997
17	"Loved and Lost"	Lee Bonner	James Kramer	March 27, 1997
18	"Ball and Chain"	Win Phelps	Clifton Campbell	April 3, 1997
19	"The Ripple Effect"	Lee Bonner	David Ehrman	April 10, 1997
20	"Past Forgiveness"	Arvin Brown	Jennifer Furlong	April 17, 1997
21	"The Pleading"	Lee Bonner	Story by : Peter Strauss; Teleplay by : David Jacobs	May 22, 1997

== Bibliography ==
- Tim Brooks and Earle Marsh, The Complete Directory to Prime Time Network and Cable TV Shows 1946–Present, Ninth edition (New York: Ballantine Books, 2007) ISBN 978-0-345-49773-4
