= Peter Strauss =

American actor

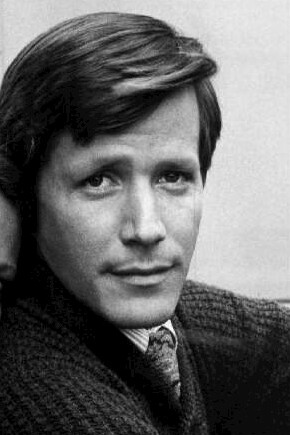
- Strauss in 1976
- Born: Peter Lawrence Strauss; February 20, 1947 (age 79); Croton-on-Hudson, New York, U.S.
- Occupations: Actor; producer
- Years active: 1969–present
- Spouses: Beverly Baker Paulding (m. 1973; div. 1979) Nicole Fons (m. 1983; div. 1994) Rachel Ticotin (m. 1998)
- Children: 2

Peter Lawrence Strauss is an American television and film actor, known for his roles in several television miniseries in the 1970s and 1980s. He is an Emmy winner and five-time Golden Globe Awards nominee.

== Early life ==
Strauss was born in Croton-on-Hudson, New York, the son of Warren B. Strauss, a German-born wine importer. His family is Jewish.

== Career ==
He won an Emmy Award for his role on the 1979 made-for-television movie The Jericho Mile, and he starred in a television remake of the classic 1946 film Angel on My Shoulder in 1980. In 1985, he played Abel Roznovski in the miniseries Kane & Abel based on Jeffrey Archer's book. His other noted television miniseries credits include starring roles in Rich Man, Poor Man, its sequel Rich Man, Poor Man Book II, and Masada. Strauss played Joseph P. Kennedy Jr. in the 1977 TV movie Young Joe, the Forgotten Kennedy. In 1973, he portrayed Stephen Linder, Mary Richards' younger boyfriend, in The Mary Tyler Moore Show fourth-season episode Angels in the Snow.

Strauss starred in the films Soldier Blue (1970) and Spacehunter: Adventures in the Forbidden Zone (1983), and has appeared in several others. He portrayed Justin, the Rats of NIMH's captain of the guard, in 1982's The Secret of NIMH. Strauss starred as an abused husband in the television movie Men Don't Tell, alongside Judith Light. In 2005, he played the U.S. President in the thriller XXX: State of the Union alongside Ice Cube, Samuel L. Jackson, Scott Speedman and Willem Dafoe.

He was the voice of Moses in the animated series K10C: Kids' Ten Commandments. He provided the voice for Stoker Van Rotten in both the 1990s and 2006 versions of Biker Mice from Mars.

== Personal life ==
Strauss married Beverly Baker Paulding in Croton-On-Hudson, New York, on January 21, 1973. He and his ex-wife, Nicole, have two sons. He runs a successful citrus production business and is on the advisory board of the Los Angeles County Arboretum and Botanic Garden. He sold a ranch property to the Santa Monica Mountains Conservancy. The ranch has since been acquired by the National Park Service as the Peter Strauss Ranch.

== Filmography ==
=== Television ===
Year	Title	Role	Notes
1970	The Young Lawyers	Stuart	Episode: "The Two Dollar Thing"
1971–1975	Medical Center	Lloyd Halloran, Tom Desmond	2 episodes
1972–1975	The Streets of San Francisco	Bobby Jepsen, Lou Kovic, Martin Novac	3 episodes
1972	Young Dr. Kildare	Reverend Teller	Episode: "By This Sign"
1973	The Mary Tyler Moore Show	Stephen	Episode: "Angels in the Snow"
1973	The Man Without a Country	Arthur Danforth	Television film
1974	Barnaby Jones	Clay Wakefield	Episode: "The Last Contract"
1974	Cannon	Dave Nordorff, Reverend Will	2 episodes
1974	Judgement: The Court Martial of the Tiger of Malaya – General Yamashita	Lawyer	Television film
1974	Hawaii Five-O	Tom Morgan	Episode: "Death with Father"
1975	Attack on Terror: The FBI vs. the Ku Klux Klan	Ben Jacobs	Television film
1976	Rich Man, Poor Man	Rudy Jordache	Miniseries; 13 episodes Nominated—Golden Globe Award for Best Actor – Television Series Drama Nominated—Primetime Emmy Award for Outstanding Lead Actor in a Limited Series or Movie
1976–1977	Rich Man, Poor Man Book II	Rudy Jordache	26 episodes Nominated—Golden Globe Award for Best Actor – Miniseries or Television Film
1977	Young Joe, the Forgotten Kennedy	Joseph P. Kennedy Jr.	Television film
1979	The Jericho Mile	Larry 'Rain' Murphy	Television film Won the Primetime Emmy Award for Outstanding Lead Actor in a Limited Series or Movie
1980	Angel on My Shoulder	Eddie Kagel	Television film
1981	Masada	Eleazar Ben Yair	Miniseries; 4 episodes Nominated—Primetime Emmy Award for Outstanding Lead Actor in a Limited Series or Movie
1981	A Whale for the Killing	Charles Landon	Television film
1983	Heart of Steel	Emory	Television film Nominated—Golden Globe Award for Best Actor – Miniseries or Television Film
1985	Kane & Abel	Abel Rosnovski	Miniseries Nominated—Golden Globe Award for Best Actor – Miniseries or Television Film
1985	Tender Is the Night	Dick Diver	Miniseries
1986	Penalty Phase	Judge Kenneth Hoffman	Television film
1986	Under Siege	John Garry	Television film
1987	Proud Men	Charley MacLeod, Jr.	Television film
1989	Peter Gunn	Peter Gunn	Television film
1989	Brotherhood of the Rose	Saul Grisman	Miniseries
1990	83 Hours 'Til Dawn	Wayne Stracton	Television film
1991	Flight of Black Angel	Col. Matt Ryan, Callsign Ringleader	Television film
1992	Trial: The Price of Passion	Warren Blackburn	Television film
1992	Fugitive Among Us	Max Cole	Television film
1993	Men Don't Tell	Ed MacAffrey	Television film Nominated—Golden Globe Award for Best Actor – Miniseries or Television Film
1994	Reunion	Sam Yates	Television film
1994	Batman: The Animated Series	Steven Carlyle (voice)	Episode: "House and Garden"
1994	The Yearling	Ezra 'Penny' Baxter	Television film
1994	Thicker Than Blood: The Larry McLinden Story	Larry McLinden	Television film
1995	Texas Justice	T. Cullen Davis	Television film
1995	Santo Bugito	Greenbeard McMelville (voice)	Episode: "My Name Is Revenge"
1996–1997	Moloney	Nicholas Moloney	26 episodes
1996	The Real Adventures of Jonny Quest	Lab Guard (voice)	Episode: "Nemesis"
1996	The Incredible Hulk	Walter Langkowski (voice)	Episode: "Man to Man, Beast to Beast"
1996	Aaahh!!! Real Monsters	Dr. Evil, Sumo (voice)	Episode: "You Only Scare Twice"
1996	Adventures from the Book of Virtues	Dionysius (voice)	Episode: "Friendship"
1996	Duckman	Narrator (voice)	Episode: "Pig Amok"
1996	In the Lake of the Woods	John Waylan	Television film
1996	Biker Mice from Mars	Stoker (voice)	4 episodes
1998	My Father's Shadow: The Sam Sheppard Story	Sam Sheppard	Television film
1999	Joan of Arc	La Hire	Miniseries
1999	Seasons of Love	Thomas Linthorne	Miniseries
2000	A Father's Choice	Charlie "Mac" McClain	Television film
2001	Strange Frequency	Ben Stanton	Episode: "Don't Stop Believing"
2001	Murder on the Orient Express	Mr. Samuel Ratchett	Television film
2002	Body & Soul	Dr. Isaac Braun	14 episodes
2003	111 Gramercy Park	Turk Karnegian	Television film
2004	Law & Order	Dr. Paul Cedars	Episode: "Coming Down Hard"
2005	Killer Instinct	Robert Hale	Episode: "Who's Your Daddy"
2006	Biker Mice from Mars	Stoker, Night Shift, High Commander (voice)	5 episodes
2006	The Way	Hutch	Television film
2007	Dirty Sexy Money	Dutch George	Episode: "The Watch"
2008–2010	Tracey Ullman's State of the Union	Narrator	13 episodes
2010	Law & Order: Special Victims Unit	Kevin Burton	Episode: "Locum"
2010	Royal Pains	Graham Barnes	Episode: "Comfort's Overrated"
2010	Jack's Family Adventure	Wild Bill Cohen	Television film
2014	Sugar Daddies	Grant Zager	Television film
2020	Grey's Anatomy	Daniel Schwartz	Episode: "The Last Supper"
2026	Hacks	Frank Vance	Episode: "Who's Making Dinner?"

=== Film ===
Year	Title	Role	Notes
1969	Hail, Hero!	Frank Dixon	
1970	Soldier Blue	Honus Gent	
1971	Sergeant Klems	Otto Flems	
1972	The Trial of the Catonsville Nine	Thomas Lewis	
1976	The Last Tycoon	Wylie	
1982	The Secret of NIMH	Justin (voice)	
1983	Spacehunter: Adventures in the Forbidden Zone	Wolff	
1995	Nick of Time	Brendan Grant	
1996	Keys to Tulsa	Chip Carlson	
2003	Kids' Ten Commandments: Toying with the Truth	Moses (voice)	Video short
2003	Kids' Ten Commandments: The Rest Is Yet to Come	Moses (voice)	Video short
2003	Kids' Ten Commandments: The Not So Golden Calf	Moses (voice)	Video short
2003	Kids' Ten Commandments: Stolen Jewels, Stolen Hearts	Moses (voice)	Video short
2003	Kids' Ten Commandments: A Life and Seth Situation	Moses (voice)	Video short
2005	XXX: State of the Union	President James Sanford	
2007	License to Wed	Mr. Jones	
2016	Drawing Home	Russell Robb Sr.	
2018	Operation Finale	Lotar Hermann	
