= Men Don't Tell =

- CBS Advertisement for "Men Don't Tell"
- Genre: Drama
- Written by: Selma Thompson; Jeff Andrus
- Directed by: Harry Winer
- Starring: Peter Strauss; Judith Light; James Gammon; Noble Willingham
- Music by: Cameron Allan
- Country of origin: United States
- Original language: English

Production
- Executive producer: Nancy Bein
- Producer: Philip Parslow
- Production locations: Queen of Angels Hospital; Todd Pacific Shipyards Corporation
- Cinematography: Kees Van Oostrum
- Editor: David Simmons
- Running time: 95 minutes
- Production companies: Lorimar Television; Daniel H. Blatt Productions; Nancy Bein Productions

Original release
- Network: CBS
- Release: March 14, 1993

Men Don't Tell is a 1993 American made-for-television drama film starring Peter Strauss and Judith Light. It was directed by Harry Winer. The film first aired on CBS network on Sunday, March 14, 1993.

The film was based on the true story of a loving husband who is terrorized by the violent behavior of his wife.

== Background ==
The original broadcast of Men Don't Tell was seen in 18.3 million homes, ranking third among the week's prime time broadcast, behind ABC's Home Improvement and CBS's 60 Minutes. The film was later shown a number of times on cable's Lifetime network. In 1994, Peter Strauss was nominated for a Golden Globe award for "Best Performance by an Actor in a Mini-Series or Motion Picture Made for TV".

In the book Abused Men: The Hidden Side of Domestic Violence by Philip W. Cook, the film's producer Nancy Bein was interviewed about the film, which she believed the reaction of the film was the greatest of all relating issues to abused men. Bein stated: "I decided to do this movie because a friend, who is a psychologist, told me about a client who was a police officer and who had been a victim of domestic violence."

In relation to the script writing, Bein said: "We made a very conscious effort to make sure the man was very masculine, because a number of people when they heard about the subject felt that the man must be very wimpy." Speaking of the film's casting, she stated: "Judith Light said yes immediately. Peter Strauss was our second choice. Our first choice was an actor who said he was very offended that we sent him the script. He was angry at his agent for soliciting the script and forwarding it to him for him to read. Peter Strauss, a very bright man, accepted and did a very good job."

Speaking of the reception, Bein stated: "CBS was very high on the movie. They saw it as very high concept because it was one movie that hadn't been done before. They turned out to be right, as it did very well. It did very well overseas as well. It was one of the highest-rated movies of the year. Out of some 300 two-hour movies, I think it was rated number four, so it did extremely well. A lot of the reaction was that people turned it on with the idea of just to watch a few minutes but ended up being compelled to watch the whole movie and feeling very differently by the time it was finished."

== Plot ==
Ed MacAffrey, a loving husband and father, is terrorized by the violent behavior of his wife, Laura. He tolerates this not only because he loves her and is concerned over the welfare of his children, but also because men are traditionally regarded as weaklings if they allow themselves to be battered by their wives. After one of Laura's destructive tantrums brings the attention of the police, Ed is suspected of being the aggressor. Finally, Laura goes too far when she physically assaults the couple's young daughter Cindy (who did nothing more than tell Laura to stop yelling), and Ed intervenes to protect her - whereupon Laura crashes through the front window of her home and is rendered comatose. As a result, Ed is arrested for domestic violence and attempted murder.

As he is interrogated, he tells his story of years of abuse, and how he even once sought help by calling a domestic violence hotline, only to get scorned and hung up on. This interrogation takes all night, by highly skeptical police. While this is going on, his children have been taken to the home of Ed's father Jack, himself a retired police officer, to spend the night. In the morning, Cindy, who chose to remain silent through the years of abuse due to the humiliation and shame, asks her grandfather if her mother was in trouble. This surprises Jack, who asks her why she thought her mother, who he thought was the victim of his abusive son, would be in trouble? To this, she says, "For being so mean to Daddy all the time, and yelling, and breaking things, and hitting us and stuff". Shocked, Jack brings Cindy to the police station and after she shares everything with the arresting officers, Ed is released from custody while Laura is herself charged with assault and battery.

Not long after Laura emerges from her coma, Ed serves as best man for the wedding of his best friend, Chuck. After giving his toast, Ed is approached by Laura, who learns that both he and the kids have moved in with Jack, then attempts to make excuses for her past behavior. When that fails, she threatens to take the kids and accuses Ed of making everyone else more important than her. He informs her that he'll do anything necessary to protect their children and while he did love her, no matter how much he tried to give, it was never enough. Laura then asks Ed what he's going to tell people about why they're splitting; after a long pause, Ed responds "the truth" and walks away.

== Cast ==
- Peter Strauss as Ed MacAffrey
- Judith Light as Laura MacAffrey
- James Gammon as Jack MacAffrey
- Noble Willingham as Riley
- Stephen Lee as Chuck
- Mary Kane as Susan
- Richard Gant as "The Pope"
- Reni Santoni (uncredited character)
- Carroll Baker as Ruth
- Ashley Johnson as Cindy MacAffrey
- Michael Rand as Alan MacAffrey
- Cliff Bemis as Danny
- Nick Angotti as Greg
- Guy Killum as Cop #1
- Katherine Cortez as Cop #2
- Judith Drake as The Waitress
- Susan Egan as The Florist
- Robert Gallo as Paramedic
- David Boreanaz as Extra (uncredited)

== Reception ==
Upon release, Ray Loynd of The Los Angeles Times wrote "The most sobering point about Men Don't Tell is that we go into the story conditioned to make jokes about wives hurling rolling pins at their husbands and then starkly witness how unfunny and terrifying it really is. Light's vicious, insecure wife is a harrowing portrait, although ultimately, to the actress's credit, touched with sympathy. Her bleak image in the movie's last scene is shattering under the fine direction of Harry Winer. And Strauss' pummeled husband - whose wife flails him with sudden, sharp fists that are so realistic they make you flinch - is a study of a warmly masculine man who is no wimp, and no wife hitter, either." Matt Roush of USA Today called the film "violent, unsettling and sympathetically acted."

John J. O'Connor of The New York Times praised the leads for their "searing" performances. Tom Shales of The Washington Post praised the film and Light as "superb at bringing out the pathos as well as the hostility in this character." Rick Marin of Variety wrote "Here's a new one for TV movies: husband-battering. Shrink John H. Chamberlain, PhD. is credited as consultant and, no doubt intended to give credence to the story. Both [characters] are burdened with backstory. Laura's nutbar mom smacked her around. Ed's mom always covered up when his dad got drunk and hit her. Laura turned out aggressive, Ed passive. Until she pushes him over the edge. Strauss pulls this one out of a hat. He's very sensitive."
