= Nancy Conrad =

American educator and entrepreneur

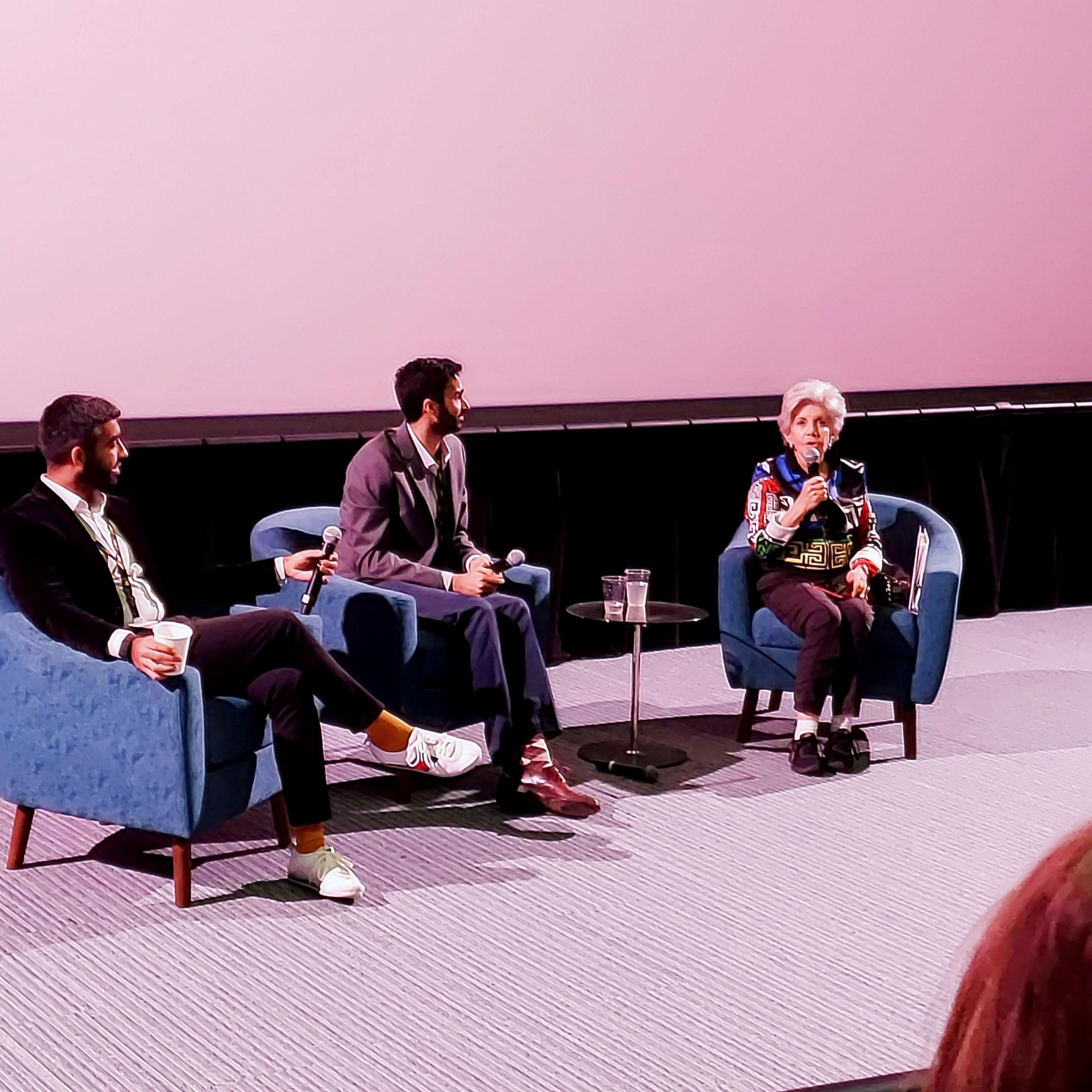
- Nancy Conrad (right) speaks with two alumni at the 2022 Conrad Summit
- Born: Nancy Crane; Denver, Colorado
- Occupations: Teacher, author, publisher, entrepreneur, and public speaker
- Organization: Conrad Foundation
- Spouse: Pete Conrad (m. 1990; died 1999)

Nancy Conrad (née Crane) is a teacher, author, publisher, entrepreneur, and public speaker. She was married to late astronaut Pete Conrad and founder and chair of the Conrad Foundation.

== Education and early career ==
She was born in Denver, Colorado, where she became a high school English teacher at George Washington High School. She later began work in the publishing industry as Associate Publisher for International Business Woman magazine. While at this publication, Conrad interviewed many notable women including Betty Ford, Kay Koplovitz, Mary Kay Ash and Caroline Rose Hunt. She also served as a contributing writer for the articles “ “A Century on Wheels: The Great American Race” and “100 Years of Moving Pictures.”

== Career ==
In 1996, Nancy Conrad founded four companies with her husband Pete Conrad to make space travel more accessible to all individuals: Universal Space Network (USN), Universal Spacelines, Universal Spaceware, and Rocket Development Company. She was the Director of Communications for Universal Space Network, which is now SSC Space US, Inc. Nancy also founded Universal Spaceworks, an astronaut licensing company representing 20 astronauts who worked at NASA. Universal Spaceworks produced educational products based on the exploration of space, including the book, Heroes of Space, published in 1999 by Intervisual Books. Under Nancy Conrad's leadership, Universal Spaceworks collaborated with Bandai America, Saban Entertainment’s toy licensee for the “Power Rangers in Space,” in 1998 to create a line of action figures called “Heroes of Space.” The line portrayed former astronauts of America's space program, including moonwalker Pete Conrad from Apollo 12, Charles Duke from Apollo 16, and Alan Bean from Apollo 12.

Nancy Conrad co-developed One Giant Leap for Mankind, chosen by NASA as the official book for the 25th anniversary of the first lunar landing. She interviewed 11 Apollo Program astronauts for the book. She also co-founded Pepper Pike Graphix, an educational comic book publishing company that produced Moonshot: The Flight of Apollo 11, used by filmmaker and actor Tom Hanks as a source for the 1998 HBO miniseries, From the Earth to the Moon . Conrad co-authored her husband's posthumous biography, Rocketman: Astronaut Pete Conrad's Incredible Ride to the Moon and Beyond, with Space Cowboys screenwriter, Howard Klausner. Rocketman was published by Penguin Books USA in 2005.

Following Pete Conrad's death after a motorcycle accident in 1999, Nancy Conrad shared Pete's story with global audiences and in the Discovery Channel documentary Surfing the Healthcare Tsunami: Bring Your Best Board. When Nancy Conrad learned that her husband's death was preventable, she co-founded the Community Emergency Healthcare Initiative through the Texas Medical Institute of Technology, to assist small and rural hospital emergency services. The Pete Conrad Global Patient Safety Award established by Nancy Conrad, is awarded to extraordinary health care leaders and institutions that bring life saving solutions into frontline healthcare use. Some past winners of the award include Sorrel King, Susan Sheridan, Heather Foster, Gregory H. Botz, William H. Adcox, David Beshk, Perry Bechtle III, Charles Denham III, C. R. Denham II, Donald Berwick, Carolyn M. Clancy, Janet Corrigan, Peter Angood, Suzanne Delbanco, James Bagian, J. Michael Henderson, David Classen, Steven Swensen, David Hunt, Dan Ford, Arlene Salamendra, Becky Martins, Jennifer Dingman, Mary Foley, and Patti O'Regan.

In 2008, Nancy Conrad founded the Conrad Foundation to engage high school students across the globe to use STEM (science, technology, engineering and math), innovation and entrepreneurship to develop technologies and solutions to real-world needs. The organization's flagship program, the Conrad Spirit of Innovation Challenge, is a competition challenging students to combine education, innovation, and entrepreneurship to create commercially viable products that address issues in sustainability.

Conrad is a published author and Editorial Advisory Board Member of the Journal of Patient Safety and a member of the Patient Engagement Board of the Global Patient Safety Team. She serves on the President's Circle of the National Academies of Sciences, Explorer's Club, and the Cosmos Club. Conrad has testified before the U.S. House of Representatives Committee on Science, Space and Technology discussing how the Conrad Foundation uses partnership and mentorship to improve STEM education. Conrad also serves on the advisory board of the B612 Foundation. She is a founding partner of the Global Patient Safety team advisory Board. Conrad served as a co-chair of the U.S. News & World Report STEMS Solutions 2012. She has been affiliated with the STEM Education Coalition, STEMconnector, the Center for the Study of the Presidency and Congress, and the Presidential Scholars. Conrad is a member of the National Small Business Association (NSBA) Leadership Council.

== Awards ==
Conrad is a recipient of the Thomas Jefferson High School 2011 Tommy Award for her contributions to STEM education. In 2012, U.S. News & World Report and STEMconnector named Conrad one of 100 Top Women Leaders in STEM and inducted her into the 100 Top Women Leaders in STEM Hall of Fame.

In 2019 Nancy Conrad was awarded a Disruptive Innovator award. The Tribeca Disruptive Innovation Awards, helmed by co-founder Craig Hatkoff, in collaboration with Professor Clayton Christensen, celebrates disruptive innovation across the full spectrum of traditional and non-traditional domains ranging from technology, biomed, politics, education, healthcare, spirituality, religion, economics, sports, fashion and philanthropy.
