= Surfing the Healthcare Tsunami =

2012 American television documentary

- Also known as: Surfing the Healthcare Tsunami: Bring Your Best Board
- Genre: Documentary
- Written by: C Denham
- Directed by: C Denham
- Country of origin: United States
- Original language: English

Production
- Executive producer: C Denham
- Producers: Matthew Listiak, Elizabeth Gay Muzio, Collin Gabriel, Jonathan Lawhead
- Editor: Dan Steinmetz
- Running time: 53 minutes
- Production companies: TMIT, Summer Productions

Original release
- Network: Discovery Channel
- Release: April 12, 2012

Surfing the Healthcare Tsunami: Bring Your Best Board is a made for television documentary that explores medical errors and waste in healthcare. It was broadcast globally on the Discovery Channel in 2012. It references federally-funded studies in the United States and news footage to support the claim that healthcare workers are afraid to speak up when medical errors occur in hospitals. The documentary covers solutions to preventable system failures causing harm. It aired four times on the Discovery Channel commercial-free in North America, Germany, the U.K., France, and other Western European countries including Sweden. It premiered at the National Press Club on April 27, 2012, after a short speech by Captain Sully Sullenberger who was featured in the film. The film was screened at the Texas Health Care Quality Improvement Awards on May 3, 2012.

== Content and Themes ==
The film uses examples of the high risk industries of auto racing, aviation, and manufacturing to illustrate dramatically improved safety through the application of best practices. It challenges consumers, caregivers, and governance board members to act. News video footage of "The Miracle on the Hudson" flight of Captain Chesley Sullenberger, who landed US Airways Flight 1549 on the Hudson River saving 155 lives is shown, and Sullenberger describes a framework he used in dealing with the crisis that can be applied to healthcare. One example explains that the Mayo Clinic in Jacksonville brought in a NASCAR pit crew chief to examine their operating room turnover and received "great suggestions" according to the Bob Brigham, COO at Mayo Clinic in Florida.

=== Denis Quaid’s Twins Medication Error ===
Surfing the Healthcare Tsunami includes appearances with actor and patient safety advocate Dennis Quaid who shares how his twins accidentally twice received 1,000 times the dosage of a dangerous blood thinner called Heparin. He reports that his twins are "doing fine," and he hopes to prevent medical errors like theirs by sharing their story. Quaid’s speech at a National Press Club event is presented in which he states that "the real sweet spot or safety envelope for high-performance care is the intersection of three systems: leadership, safe practices, and technology. When these support systems are functioning within the right organizational culture, we get great care and we get safe care." National network news video of interviews of Quaid on CNN, MSNBC, and C-SPAN are included in the film.

=== Chasing Zero: Winning the War on Healthcare harm ===
The documentary references the made for television documentary also broadcast globally in the Discovery Channel, Chasing Zero: Winning the War on Healthcare Harm which used hospital accidents to focus a lens on leaders in healthcare reducing preventable medical error rates to zero. The documentary captures segments of Chasing Zero filmed around the globe at locations including Geneva, Switzerland; London, England; Hawaii; the Brigham and Women’s Hospital; the Cleveland Clinic; Vanderbilt University Medical Center; Johns Hopkins; and the Mayo Clinic.

=== Eric Cropp and the Death of Emily Jerry ===
The film covers the death of a 2-year-old girl killed by a preventable and accidental lethal injection of a salt solution during cancer treatment. The father of the child who died, Christopher Jerry, sat with the pharmacist convicted of manslaughter in the death of Emily Jerry, and forgave him on camera. They pledged to work together to prevent this type of error from happening again.

=== Communicating with the News Media ===
The documentary examines the difficulty the producers had in their efforts to bring attention to system errors in healthcare by showing a clip from their appearance on the MSNBC show Morning Joe on April 22, 2010. Joe Scarborough attempted to enforce the message that you can not trust healthcare providers by asking, "you've got to be very skeptical of every doctor and every nurse? You don't want to get in the way of what they're doing, but you just can't take their word for it anymore, can you?" But the data shows that systems errors are the cause of harm, not individuals.

=== I Love Lucy ===
Surfing the Healthcare Tsunami used the scene from the September 15, 1952, episode of I Love Lucy, "Job Switching", as a metaphor for how systems can cause well-meaning and competent caregivers to make errors. In the scene, Lucy and Ethel attempt to keep up with an unmanageable pace of chocolates coming off of an assembly line. When they do well, the manager increases the speed, forcing them to hide their errors. In turn, the manager thinks they can handle the increased speed and increases the speed again, leading to more failures in their work. As Dr. Thomas J. Lee notes, "Lucy and Ethel must feel the way that contemporary employees feel as they are constantly pushed to produce more and perform better without adequate or appropriate training, support, or understanding." This scene has been used in healthcare to represent what happens to frontline healthcare workers, resulting in medical errors.

=== Global Crisis ===
The documentary recognized the global impact of medical errors by sharing that in hospitals across Western Europe, North America, and Australia, the chances of being subjected to a medical error in hospital is 1 in 10. The chances of dying from an error is 1 in 300, according to Sir Liam Donaldson of the World Health Organization.

=== Aviation Safety and Healthcare Comparisons ===
The documentary interviews several notable people in aviation including Chesley Sullenberger and John J. Nance. They recount that aviation saw that they had system errors that would doom the industry, the industry got together to fix the problems by forming the private-public joint task force, Commercial Aviation Safety Team (CAST).

=== Story Power ===
The film introduces the concept of Story Power, using patient stories to engage the hearts and minds of medical professionals to change the way they deliver care for the better. This concept is based on the Journal of Patient Safety article, Story Power: The Secret Weapon by Dennis Quaid, Julie Thao, and Dr. Charles Denham. This section features Patient Safety Advocate and Author, Regina Holliday who encourages patient advocates and healthcare providers to engage patients and their families in dialogue about solutions for healthcare.

== Interviewees and Participants ==
- Eric Cropp
- Dennis Quaid
- Charles Denham
- Ashish Jha
- Ginny Ueberroth
- Tom Van Dawark
- Julie Thao
- Lucian Leape
- Chris Jerry
- Dr. Brent James
- Liam Donaldson
- Robert Brigham
- Franck Guilloteau
- Pete Conrad
- Nancy Conrad
- James P. Bagian
- Chesley Sullenberger
- Bob Chapman
- Perry Bechtle,
- Nate Stuart
- Howard Koh
- Dennis Wagner
- John H. Noseworthy, MD
- David Classen
- Carolyn M. Clancy
- Leah Binder
- Harvey V. Fineberg,
- Sorrel King
- Sandy Tolchin
- Donald Berwick
- Clayton Christensen
- Ann Rhoades
- Alfred E. Mann
- Ed Kelley
- David Hunt
- Steve Swensen
- David Soffa
- Steven Seltzer
- Ramin Khorasani
- Gladstone McDowell
- John J. Nance
- Penny George
- Bill George
- Julie Morath
- Sharon Rossmark
- Gary Kaplan
- Bill Rupp
- Gary Gottlieb
- Toby Cosgrove
- Ellen Brzytwa
- Rosabeth Moss Kanter
- Jeanette Ives Erickson
- Harry Sax
- J. Michael Henderson, MD
- Peter Pronovost
- Kevin Weiss
- Sanjiv Chopra
- Jenny Dingman
- Regina Holliday
