= Medical Tactical Training Program =

Medical training program in the US

The Medical Tactical Certificate Training Program, also known as Med Tac, is a global bystander rescue care training program that focuses on life-saving actions that can be performed by non-medical bystanders for the eight leading preventable causes of death to children, youth, and adults. In urban areas in the United States, professional first responders arrive at the scene of an emergency after approximately 10 minutes. Immediate rescue care by bystanders is most effective within three minutes of an event. Treatment within this time has been found to have a significant effect on rates of survival and permanent harm. Created and expanded upon after the dramatic increase in active shooter and terrorism events, Med Tac integrates the American Heart Association Heartsaver CPR/AED Training Program, or the American Red Cross equivalent training, and the Stop the Bleed Program sponsored by the United States Department of Homeland Security and American College of Surgeons.

== Med Tac Bystander Rescue Care Program ==
Med Tac offers free bystander rescue training to schools and youth organizations. According to Campus Safety Magazine, the program has been implemented in multiple regions, and in independent accounts instructors and trainees have reported saving lives shortly after certification.. It teaches varied skills that can be used in the first few minutes before professional first responders arrive. The health hazards to children and adults are sudden cardiac arrest, choking and drowning, opioid overdose, anaphylaxis, major trauma and bleeding, common accidents, non-traffic related vehicular accidents, and bullying and workplace violence. Given the Medical Tactical Training Program was the first of its kind to address all of these leading causes of death and harm in a single, integrated program, the founders were awarded the 2018 Pete Conrad Patient Safety Award for their work in life-saving training. The program has been communicated globally by publications such as Campus Safety Magazine in that trainees and instructors of the program have saved lives by applying the training they received in the program just weeks after initial training.

== Background ==
The program was founded in 2015 by Dr. Gregory Botz and William H. Adcox at the University of Texas MD Anderson Cancer Center, and Charlie Denham III and Dr. Charles Denham II of TMIT in California when they were developing an active shooter training program for the Texas Medical Center and schools in Texas and Orange County California. Med Tac is provided by TMIT Global, a 501(c)(3) medical research organization that has led a global patient safety community of practice since 1999. The TMIT National Research Test Bed, established by TMIT Global, has studied the most common Hospital Acquired Conditions and pay-for-performance programs in collaboration with The Centers for Medicare and Medicaid, the Healthcare Resources and Services Administration, and major employer groups. The Med Tac program is focused on pre-hospital emergency care and emergency medical care prior to discharge from hospitals to the care of primary care physicians.

== Med Tac Curriculum ==
Students taking the basic program for schools and scout groups receive 3 hours of online training followed by onsite competency training. The onsite includes instruction by AHA-certified CPR/AED or American Red Cross Instructors who certify their competencies in CPR and the use of an Automated External Defibrillator. The Stop the Bleed certification course is also taught and competencies for severe bleeding control are taught. The online training is free and onsite training is paid by learners to local instructors found through the AHA, American Red Cross, and American College of Surgeons. Learners are trained in the use of the Heimlich Maneuver, care of drowning victims, prevention from lacerations that can lead to sepsis, and care for opioid overdose. Certifications are provided to lower, middle, and upper school students. The first college-specific program for students was launched at Stanford University to address the unique rescue challenges for young adults.

== Global Scale Model ==
Med Tac uses a four-element approach to develop global scale. Core curricular elements are continuously updated, online technology is leveraged, and all funding remains local so that communities grow their own training ecosystem.

=== Bystander Care ===
The global bystander care training program development focuses on the vital first few lifesaving minutes before professional first responders arrive. The curriculum is continually updated to mirror the latest evidence-based medicine guidelines and developments accepted by national Emergency Medicine and Critical Care organizations. By applying internationally accepted standards of care, the program is adopted more widely internationally.

=== Blended Learning ===
A blended learning approach of online knowledge transfer complemented by onsite skill training and deliberative practice led by local trainers. The online component of the program is free to grade schools, scouting organizations, and faith-based institutions. The participating organizations supply local, qualified instructors who are engaged directly by them.

=== Immersive Simulation ===
Simulation techniques using real life scenarios are used to improve reaction during high stress crises. Scenarios include making 911 calls, communicating with first responders, key task assignments, performing CPR and using AEDs, practice caring for severe bleeding, using epinephrine auto-injectors such as EPI Pens, and using opioid reversal agents.

=== Team of Teams and network of networks ===
Med Tac uses existing training networks of educators and membership organizations such as schools, scouts, clubs, and faith-based platforms instead of trying to build entirely new networks. Multi-generational teams from local networks can meet the needs of the broad age range of students.

== Specialty Programs ==
The training has been customized to specific environments with different needs, the Med Tac Programs became scalable when adjusted to other organizations and environments. The evidence-based and data driven specialty programs include a Lifeguard – Surf Initiative, SCUBA Divers, Aviation, Law Enforcement and Security, Youth Mentorship Kid Leaders program, Healthcare Security Ministry, and corporate programs.

== Recognition and awards ==
The Med Tac Team won the 2018 Pete Conrad Global Patient Safety Award for its work in life-saving training.

== Documentaries and Media ==
Members of the Med Tac team have produced documentaries broadcast globally on the Discovery Channel including Chasing Zero: Winning the War on Healthcare Harm and Surfing the Healthcare Tsunami: Bring Your Best Board. A third documentary in the series is titled 3 Minutes and Counting which will tell the story of Med Tac and how bystanders who take very basic training can save the lives of others in the first 3 minutes of a medical emergency before professional first responders arrive. Campus Safety Magazine published a series of articles highlighting the benefits of implementing a Med Tac program between December 2018 and November 2019. The articles included:

- How Bystanders Can Save Lives In Medical Emergencies, Campus Safety, November/December 2018
- Effectively Responding to Active Shooters In Healthcare Facilities, Campus Safety, January/February 2019
- Battling Failure to Rescue with Rapid Response Teams, Campus Safety, June 2019
- Inadequate Placement of AEDs and Bleeding Control Gear Could Cost You, Campus Safety, November 2019
