= UTPD =

UTPD may refer to:

- University of Tennessee Police Department
- University of Texas at Houston Police Department
