= Botz =

Botz is a German language surname. It stems from the male given name Burchard – and may refer to:

- Bob Botz (1935), former Major League Baseball relief pitcher
- Gerhard Botz (1955), German politician
- Gregory H. Botz (1962), American intensive care specialist physician
- Gustav Botz (1883–1932), German actor
