= Dave deBronkart =

American cancer patient

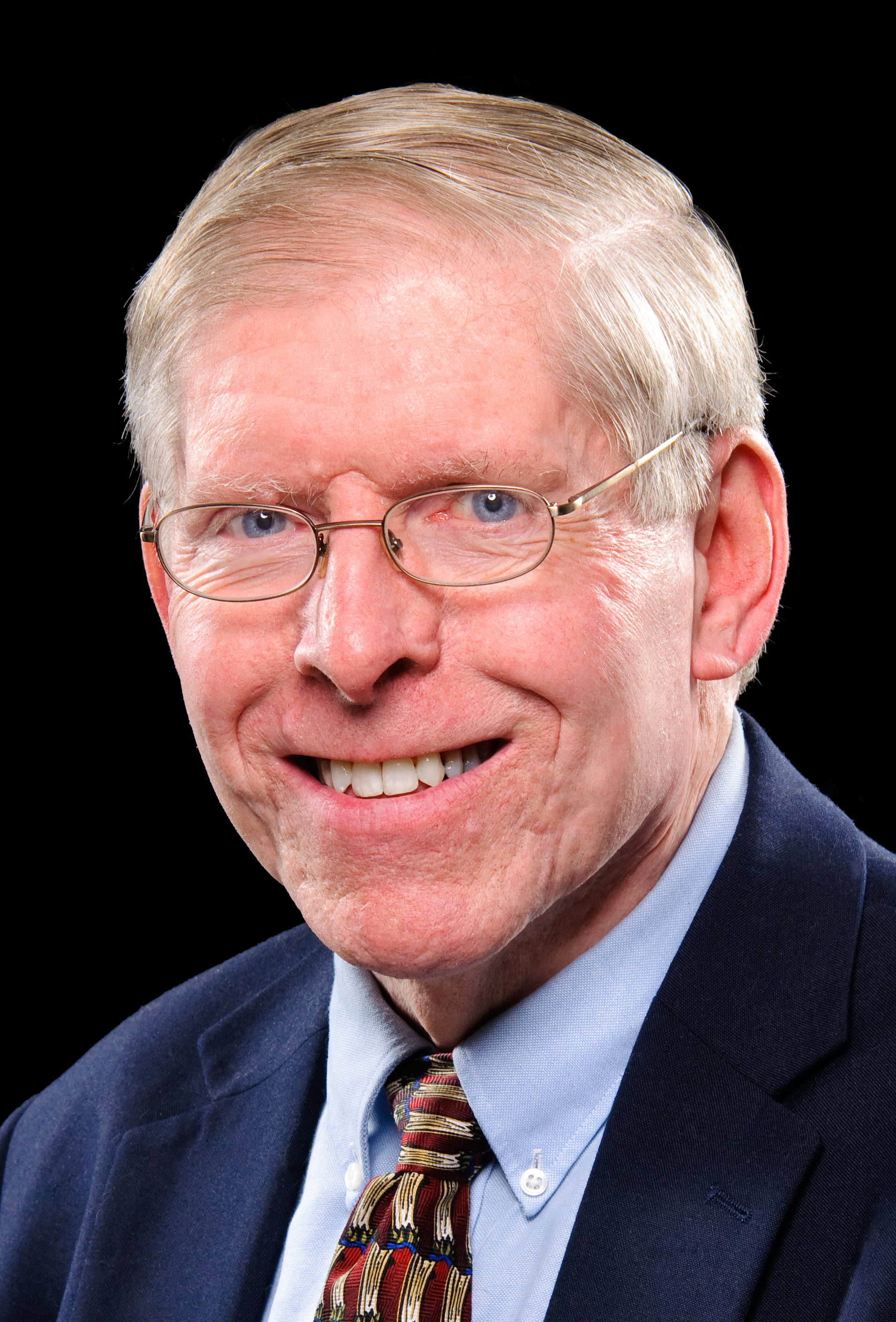
Portrait by Roger Ramirez

Richard Davies deBronkart Jr (born February 18, 1950), widely known as e-Patient Dave, is a cancer survivor and blogger who, in 2009, became a noted activist for healthcare transformation through participatory medicine and personal health data rights.

== Disease and treatment ==
In January 2007, a routine shoulder x-ray incidentally disclosed a shadow in the lung, which turned out to be metastasized kidney cancer (stage IV, grade 4 renal cell carcinoma). His median survival time at diagnosis was 24 weeks. A member of online communities since CompuServe in 1989, he responded by seeking online resources in addition to receiving treatment at Beth Israel Deaconess Medical Center.

His kidney was removed laparoscopically and he was treated in a clinical trial of high-dose interleukin-2 (HDIL-2), ending 7/23/07, which was effective in reducing the cancer, although his femur ultimately broke from damage caused by the disease. Visible lesions on follow-up CT scans continued to shrink for two years following treatment, and the cancer was determined at that time to be in remission.

== Discovering the e-Patient movement ==
Before and during his illness, he had been writing journals and blog posts about his experiences. On the hospital's blog he signed himself "Patient Dave"; upon recovery from near-death he started a blog "The New Life of Patient Dave." In January 2008 he learned of the so-called "e-Patient White Paper" by Dr. Thomas William Ferguson, which described how patients are using the Internet to participate actively in their care. He recognized it as a match for his own actions during his illness and renamed himself "e-Patient Dave," and his blog The New Life of e-Patient Dave.

He became the most active blogger on e-patients.net, a blog founded by the late Dr. Tom Ferguson, which he now manages. In February 2009, Ferguson's e-Patient Scholars Working Group elected him founding co-chair (with his physician, Dr. Danny Sands) of the Society for Participatory Medicine. At conferences and meetings he is a frequent speaker about the "e-Patient" movement, also referred to as "patient engagement" and "participatory medicine."

== Advocate for personal health records ==
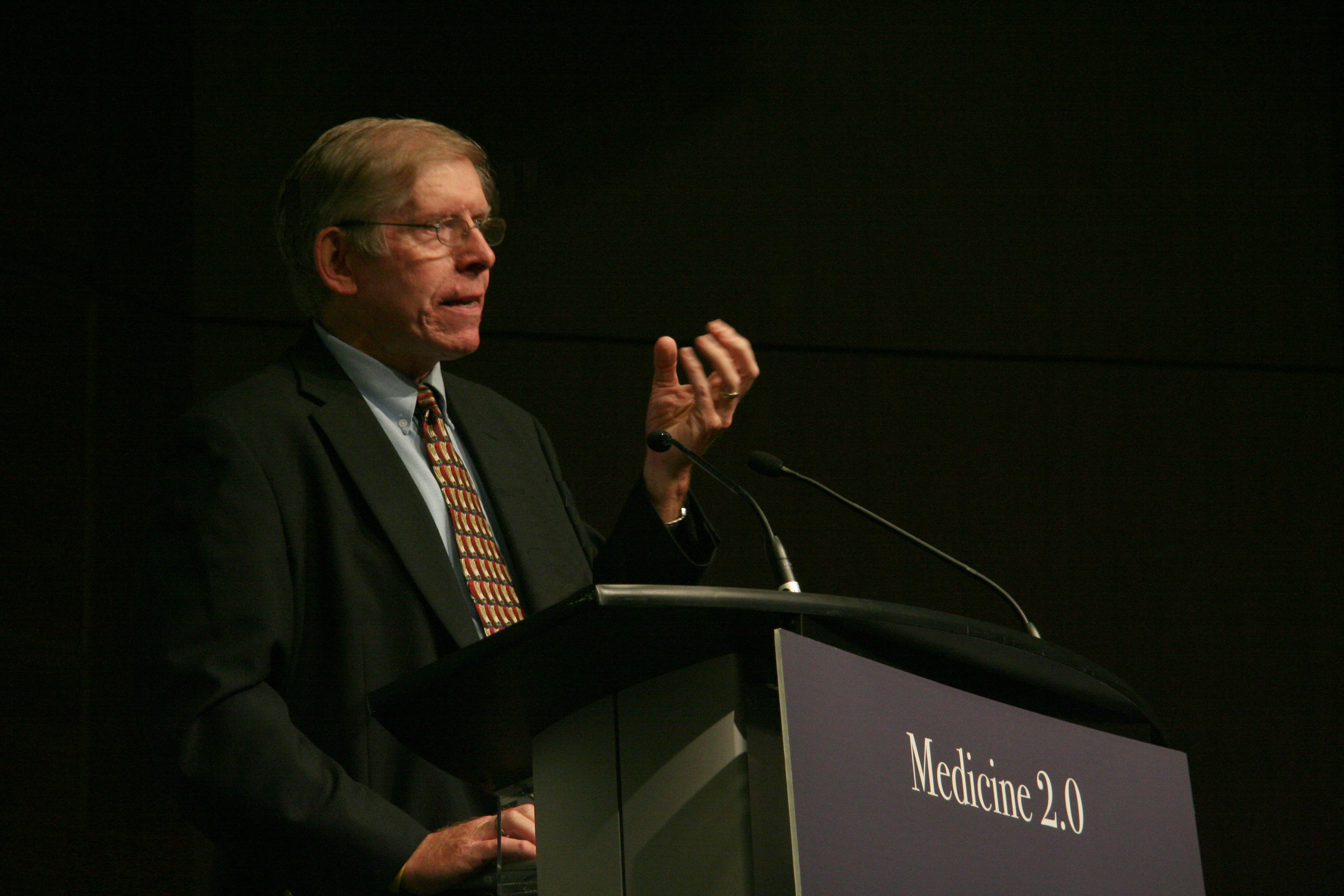
deBronkart at the Medicine 2.0 Conference

Early in 2009, deBronkart decided to activate his hospital's option to transfer his personal health data into Google Health, Google's personal health record (PHR) system. As described in a 3300-word blog post, the transferred data contained much erroneous information: a false medication warning, exaggerated diagnoses, and conditions he'd never had. In addition, the system failed to transfer existing information such as laboratory results, radiology reports, and allergies.

The post was picked up on many blogs, and on April 13, 2009, was covered on the front page of The Boston Globe.

The central problem was that the hospital transferred insurance billing codes, not clinical data. The Globe said billing codes "sometimes reflect imprecise information plugged into codes required by insurers. ... some doctors fear that inaccurate information from billing data could lead to improper treatment."

The timing of the discovery was accidentally important because, at that time, national political negotiations were underway to promote the adoption of computerized medical record systems. Referring to the 2009 ARRA economic stimulus package, the Globe said:

"Ideally insurance claims could provide a trove of data that could greatly accelerate the Obama administration's effort to computerize all medical records within five years. The stimulus package contained $17 billion to help computerize doctors' records. But transferring existing information from paper or outdated computers could take years and hundreds of millions of dollars to complete.

Insurance data, by contrast, is already computerized and far easier and cheaper to download. But it is also prone to inaccuracies, partly because of the clunky diagnostic coding language used for medical billing, or because doctors sometimes label a test with the disease they hope to rule out, medical technology specialists say.

"Claims data is notoriously inaccurate and notoriously incomplete with respect to an expression of the problems a person has," said Dr. David Kibbe, a senior technology adviser to the American Academy of Family Physicians.

Within days the hospital announced it would no longer use billing data as a proxy for clinically valid information.

The following week deBronkart, Google, and the hospital were scheduled to speak at a major industry conference "Health 2.0 Meets Ix," and the PHR story became one of the main topics. By end of the month over 11,000 articles and blog posts on the subject had appeared.

== Public speaking ==
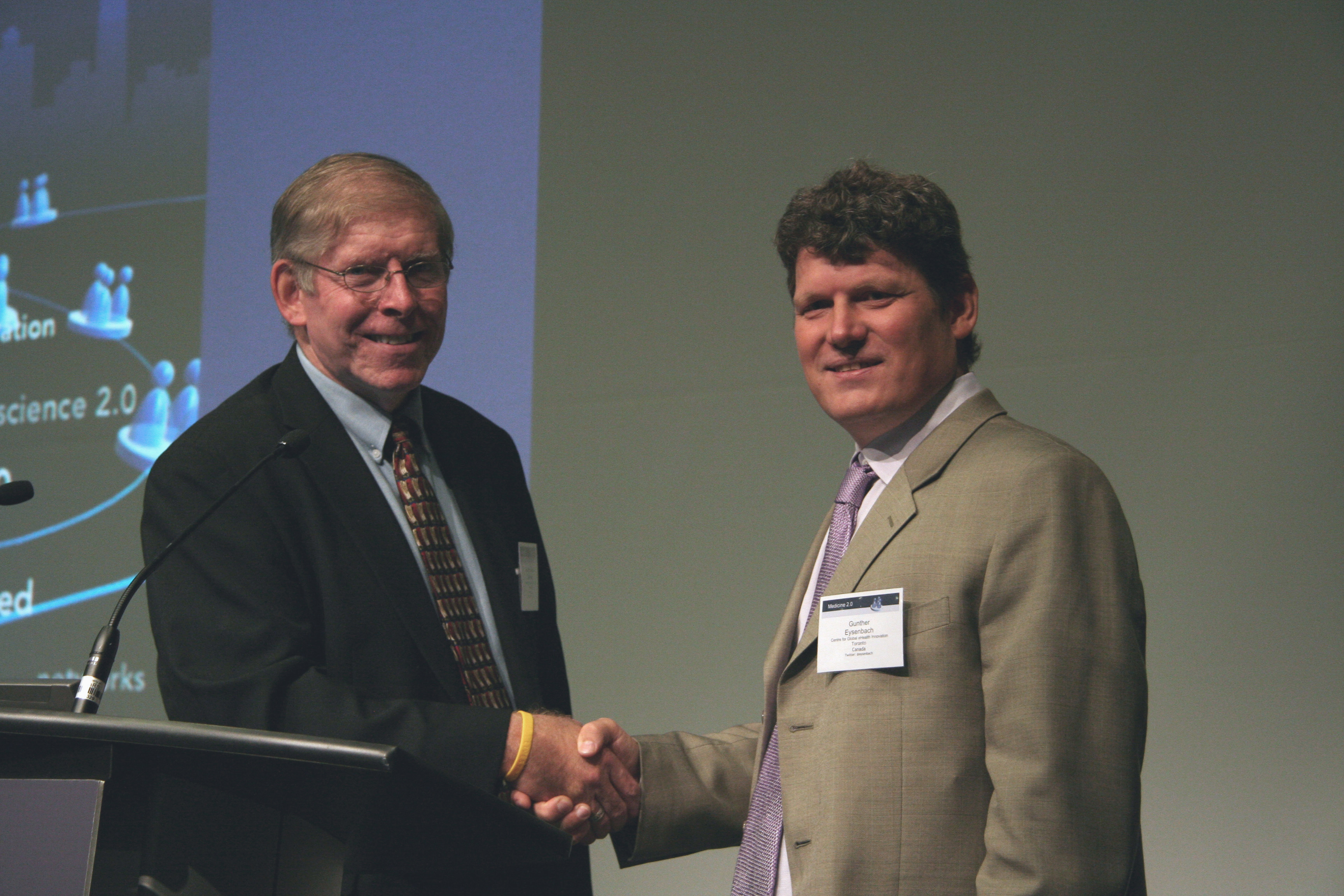
Gunther Eysenbach MD MPH (right), founder and producer of the Medicine 2.0 conference series, and chair/director of the Medicine 2.0'09 congress in Toronto, thanks Dave Debronkart for his keynote address.

In May 2009, citing "a bumpy and public transition of his medical records," the Boston Globe called him "a recognized online champion of 'participatory medicine'."

deBronkart became a frequent speaker at healthcare industry conferences. He was the first patient to deliver the opening keynote at a Medicine 2.0 conference, and spoke at many others throughout 2009.

In July, the annual Best Hospitals issue of U.S. News & World Report cited him in its article "Getting Medical Advice on the Web from Other Patients."

In September 2009 he delivered the opening keynote (photo above) at the Medicine 2.0 Congress in Toronto. The same month he was featured in the cover story "Patient of the Future" in Health Leaders magazine. Three months later the magazine named him and his physician, Dr. Danny Sands, as two of the annual "20 People Who Make Healthcare Better".

That keynote was titled "Gimme My Damn Data." In January 2010 CNN's Empowered Patient feature quoted him and alluded to the speech's title in its headline, "Patients demand: 'Give us our damned data.'"

Addresses in early 2010 expanded his audience.

- In January he addressed The FDA Workshop on Medical Device Interoperability: achieving safety and effectiveness on software development issues, patients' desire for better tools, and the business ecosystem aspects of device development.
- In May 2010 the Institute for Clinical Systems Improvement and Institute for Healthcare Improvement invited him to speak on "What e-Patients Want from Doctors, Hospitals and Health Plans in a Time of Change." The speech received an average audience rating of 4.9 on a 5-point scale.
- Also in May he delivered a keynote at the World Congress on IT in Amsterdam, in the eHealth track, and represented the patient voice in the track's closing panel.
- On May 22 he and Regina Holliday made a presentation called "Consumers in the Trenches" at the Medical Library Association 2010 Annual Meeting and Exhibition in Washington, DC.
- In June, at the annual meeting of AHRQ's health IT contractors, his keynote was titled "Over My Dead Body: Why Reliable Systems Matter to Patients." The title alluded to a supposed remark by a health IT vendor executive, who was rumored to have said that system usability would become a Meaningful Use criterion "over my dead body." deBronkart's assertion was that poor usability harms clinicians' ability to use systems reliably, which can lead to patient harm.

In April 2011 he gave a talk at TED (conference), set up by Lucien Engelen (of the Radboud University Medical Center), that got featured on the TED.com platform.

== Healthcare Quality Improvement ==
In March 2010 his hospital invited his participation as a voice of the patient in their annual Lean quality improvement workshop. A series of blog posts described the experience.

== Author ==
He is the author of three books. The best known is "Let Patients Help: A Patient Engagement Handbook," published in 2013 on the CreateSpace Independent Publishing Platform.

Laugh, Sing, and Eat Like a Pig: How an empowered patient beat Stage IV cancer (and what healthcare can learn from it), published in 2010 by Changing Outlook Press. The title comes from the positive approach he chose to confront his disease: Laugh (as Norman Cousins did when facing a fatal condition in the 1960s), Sing (his doctor advised him *not* to drop out of his chorus), and Eat Like a Pig (his doctor ordered a diet to increase his caloric intake). The third, "Facing Death - With Hope" is a small extract from this book.

== Personal ==
After a career in high tech marketing outside Boston, these events led to healthcare transformation and policy issues taking an increasingly large part of his time. In summer 2009 he opened a consulting practice, ePatientDave.com, and went full-time in healthcare in February 2010. He lives in Nashua, New Hampshire.
