= Vicki King =

American police officer

Vicki King is an American police chief and healthcare threat safety scientist. She is the leader of the threat assessment unit at the University of Texas at Houston Police Department, a component of the University of Texas System.

== Early life and education ==
King was born in Houston. When she joined the Houston Police Department in 1985, women in patrol and investigations were still rare. In 2001, King received a Bachelor of Science degree in criminal justice, and in 2006 received a Master's of Science in the same discipline, from the University of Houston.

== Career ==
King served 27 years with the Houston Police Department; she eventually became the Assistant Chief. As Chief of Detectives, Tactical Support Commander, and Director of Forensic Services, she oversaw some of HPD's highest-profile cases, including serial homicides, corruption, domestic violence, sexual assaults, and gangland slayings. King created the Gang Murder Squad within the Houston Police Department, which resulted in homicide clearance rates improving from 62% in 2005 to 94% in 2008. She left the Houston Police Department to serve as an emissary to the Saudi Royal family. She has been an adjunct professor for the University of Houston system and has been the Chief of Police for the City of La Marque, Texas.

== Threat safety research and development ==
King works in threat safety science for the healthcare industry. As a leader of the threat management unit at the MD Anderson Cancer Center, her work includes the de-escalation of high threat situations.
