= William H. Adcox =

American police chief

- Born: 1958 (age 67–68)
- Occupations: Chief Security Officer for the University of Texas MD Anderson Cancer Center, Chief of Police and Security Officer at the University of Texas at Houston Police Department,
- Known for: awarded with the Pete Conrad Global Patient Safety Award in 2018

William H. Adcox (born 1958) is the Chief Security Officer for the University of Texas MD Anderson Cancer Center and a pioneer of Threat Safety Science in healthcare. He is also the Chief of Police and Security Officer at the University of Texas at Houston Police Department, University of Texas System component. He has had a longstanding career as a police officer and Deputy Chief of Police in El Paso, Texas.

== Early life and education ==
Adcox joined the El Paso Police Department in 1978 after attending the El Paso Police Academy. He later attended Park College in Parkville, Missouri earning a Bachelor of Science degree in Management in 1997. In 2004, he earned a Master of Science in Business Administration from the University of Texas at El Paso, and has had subsequent business training at the Wharton School of Business at the University of Pennsylvania

== Career ==
=== El Paso Police Department, El Paso, Texas ===
Adcox was sworn in as an officer of the law with the El Paso Police Department in 1978. He was promoted to captain of the Administrative Services Division in May 1993 where he managed 300 sworn and civilian personnel. In October 1993, he was appointed the captain of the Special Operations and Training Division where assisted in oversight of the department's implementation of community-based policing and increased minority representation on the academy training staff. In 1994, Adcox reviewed training staff and concluded that the ethnic and gender make up was not representative of the city or the department. He implemented a performance improvement program consisting of a rotation system, heightened staff standards, implemented a fair and equitable selection process for staff members, and recruited qualified interested staff members in order to address the issue of representation with noteworthy improvement in all measures.

In November 1996 until his retirement, he served as deputy chief, where he oversaw numerous successful multi-agency task force operations working with agencies of the U.S. Department of Homeland Security, DEA and the FBI.

=== University of Texas at El Paso Police Department ===
Adcox took the role of chief of police University of Texas at El Paso Police Department in September 1999. At the time, the UTEP police force policed a campus with 3,700 employees, 15,000 students, and thousands of annual visitors. When he was hired, Adcox was praised by Juan Sandoval, UTEP vice president for finance and administration, for being "well versed in community relations."

=== University of Texas at Houston Police Department ===
In 1999, Adcox became the chief of police at the University of Texas at Houston Police Department, which protects the University of Texas M. D. Anderson Cancer Center and The University of Texas Health Science Center at Houston. Since his tenure as chief, the UTPD has maintained its accreditation by the Commission on Accreditation for Law Enforcement Agencies (CALEA). In 2009 the department was accredited by the International Association of Campus Law Enforcement Administrators (IACLEA) and received its second reaccreditation in 2014. The department also received Texas Police Chief's Association Law Enforcement Best Practices Recognition in 2010 and Re-Recognition in 2013. Adcox was appointed by Chancellor Francisco Cigarroa to the UT System Police Management Review Task Force and selection committee for the System Director of Police. He was a panelist participant for two major United States Department of Energy city, county, state and federal emergency response exercises, Space City Thunder in 2009 and Rolling Thunder in 2013.

== Threat Safety Research and Development ==
=== Threat Safety Research and Development ===
Adcox is one of the pioneers Threat Safety Science for the healthcare industry sector along with his research colleagues at MD Anderson Cancer Center, clinical experts at the Texas Medical Center, and national threat management and patient safety experts. The research and development work is focused on prevention, preparedness, protection, and performance improvement related to manmade and natural threats.

=== Establishment of a Threat Management Unit ===
Adcox established a Threat Management Unit at the University of Texas whose actions have resulted in a 300% increase in early intervention reporting between 2012 and 2014. UTPD officers are trained to evaluate dynamic situations in order to engage individuals and provide help before a situation turns violent or deadly. Reports indicate that hospital employees feel more comfortable reporting concerning behavior so officers can get these individuals help before their behavior escalates to criminal activity or harm to themselves or others. The unit was involved in 11 suicide interventions in a four-month period where the people investigated were held under an Emergency Detention Order and given psychiatric care. During that same four-month period, the Threat Management Unit intervened in 18 cases in which the subject was considered to be at high risk for committing a violent act.

=== Medical Tactical Training Program ===
Adcox is an expert contributor to a global bystander care training program, called Med Tac, that combines professional expertise and evidence-based techniques from the medical and tactical communities to train people with lifesaving behaviors that can be used in the first few minutes after a life-threatening event and before professional first responders arrive. He is the lead contributor to the program for law enforcement and security professionals and launched the program at MD Anderson Cancer Center. Adcox and the core team that created Med Tac were awarded with the Pete Conrad Global Patient Safety Award in 2018 for their work in this area. They lead ongoing training and R&D in Texas, California, Florida, and Hawaii, and the programs have expanded to lifeguards, diving programs, and commercial air travel.

== Certifications ==
- National Security Clearance – Federal Bureau of Investigation
- Master Peace Officer, Texas Commission on Law Enforcement (TCOLE)
- Police Instructor –State of Texas
- Academic Recognition Award - State of Texas

== Professional Affiliations ==
- International Association of Chiefs of Police
- International Association of Campus Law Enforcement Administrators
- Police Executive Research Forum
- Texas Police Chiefs Association
- American Society for Industrial Security – Chief Security Officer (CSO) Roundtable
- International Association for Healthcare Safety and Security
- Security Executive Council
- Association of Threat Assessment Professionals

== Honors and awards ==
- 2013 - Police Chief of the Year, University of Texas System Police
- 2013 - Most Influential People in Security, Security Magazine
- 2013 - IACLEA Award for Administrative Excellence, International Association of Campus Law Enforcement Administrators
- 2015 – Director of the Year for healthcare Public Safety, Campus Safety magazine
- 2015 – IHSSF Lindberg Distinguished Program Award, International Healthcare Safety and Security Foundation
- 2015 – NTOA Spirit Award, National Tactical Officers Association honoring UT Police at Houston –the only university police department in the nation to receive the NTOA award
- 2018 – Russell L. Colling Literary Award
