= Regina Holliday =

American artist and patient advocate

- Born: Regina McCanless
- Education: Oklahoma State University
- Known for: Muralist, Painter
- Website: Regina Holliday's Medical Advocacy Blog

Regina Holliday (née Regina McCanless) is a Grantsville, Maryland, resident, art teacher, artist, muralist, patient rights arts advocate, founder of the Walking Gallery and the Medical Advocacy Mural Project.

== Health advocacy ==
On March 27, 2009, her husband, Fred Holliday II, was diagnosed with metastatic kidney cancer, after months of escalating pain medication prescribed for symptom relief, without a diagnosis of the cause of the pain. Fred died on June 17, 2009.

Holliday's response to the shock and anguish of losing her 39-year-old husband (and to her husband's urging on his deathbed) was to become an arts advocate for all patients' rights to their own medical data.

During his final hospitalization, Holliday asked to see her husband's medical records, so that she could do online research of his condition and care, and so that they could make informed decisions together. At the first of five hospitals he was admitted to during this medical ordeal, on April 18, 2009, she was told that copies of his records would cost $.73 per page and would be available after a 21-day wait. That would have been May 9, 2009. Fred Holliday II died at home on June 17, 2009.

In Holliday's words, her husband's final message inspired her advocacy: "He's got a paper in his hand. It says: 'Go After Them Regina, Love Fred.'" On her blog on Sunday August 9, 2009, she wrote: "I am painting because it is the best way I know that can make a difference. I will paint our sorrow on a wall for all to see. It is hard to look away. It makes you think. It makes you question. The scariest thing to the status-quo is an electorate that is thinking and asking questions. I am as grassroots as it comes. There is just me on a 20 foot ladder donated by my church. I am using paint brushes I have had for 17 years. I am applying acrylic paint (paid for by donations of friends and strangers) on a wall donated by a gas station."

Holliday contributed a chapter to 2010's The Big Book of Social Media about the treatment of her husband by the health care industry.

== Murals ==
Holliday has completed three murals in Washington, D.C., on themes relating to health care and patients' rights:

- "73 cents" - Located at 5001 Connecticut Ave, Washington, DC 20008.
- "Medical Facts Mural" - Was located at 5504 Connecticut Ave, Washington, DC 20008. Now removed.
- "We Need More Nurses" - Located at 5532 Connecticut Ave, Washington, DC 20008.

== Exhibitions ==
"The Walking Gallery" is an evolutionary step in public art - from murals on walls of buildings to mini-murals painted on the backs of jackets, lab coats, etc. Conceived by Holliday, at first painted solely by Holliday, then with her encouragement, engaging other painters (and health advocate jacket wearers) to join the live gallery.

The Walking Gallery premiered during the 2011 Washington, DC Health Innovation Week, on June 7, 2011, at Kaiser Permanente Center for Total Health. Each painting tells a story, either the wearers or Holliday's, about patient issues, health care reform, national and global health issues.

As of July 2012, the Walking Gallery includes 170 jackets, painted primarily by Holliday and worn by 155 walkers.

"e-Patient Ephemera" - Held at Clinovations, Georgetown, DC. Opening reception: July 29, 2010; sponsors: Clinovations and the Society for Participatory Medicine.

== Documentary film ==
Eidolon Films released "73 cents: A grieving artist, a 50 foot wall, and a quest for patient rights," a short documentary film that tells the story behind Holliday's mural, "73 cents," in 2011.

== Speaking engagements ==
Holliday frequently speaks at conferences and other gatherings:

- Stanford Medicine X Artist-in-Residence, Stanford University, Stanford, California, US, Sept 28-30. 2012
- Health Informatics Conference, Melbourne, Australia, July 30–August 2, 2012.
- Office of the National Coordinator for Health IT Regional Meeting, Philadelphia, PA, July 13, 2011.
- Kaiser Permanente Center for Total Health, Washington, DC. "The Walking Gallery", June 9, 2011.
- Microsoft Connected Health Conference, April 27, 2011, Chicago, Illinois.
- Oklahoma Society of Clinical Oncology, July 2010.
- Testimony at Meaningful Use Announcement, July 2010, introduction by Kathleen Sebelius, Secretary of Health and Human Services
- National Partnership for Women & Families 2010 Annual Luncheon, June, 2010, Washington, DC.
- Medical Library Association 2010 Annual Meeting and Exhibition, May 22, 2010, Washington, DC. "Consumers in the Trenches" with Dave deBronkart (ePatient Dave).

== Personal life ==
Holliday was born in rural Oklahoma, studied at Oklahoma State University, teaches art, and has worked in retail.

In 1993, Holliday married Frederick Allen Holliday II, PhD, an adjunct professor at American University, Washington, D.C. They had two sons before Fred died of kidney cancer at 39, on June 17, 2009.

== See also ==
- Dave deBronkart (e-Patient Dave) an advocate for personal health data rights.
- Epatients (e-Patient) background on the e-Patient movement.
- Health 2.0 background on medical records, personal health records, patient engagement in health care, etc.
- Electronic health record
- Electronic medical record
- Health Information Technology
