= Gregory H. Botz =

American intensivist

- Born: 1962 (age 63–64); Orange County, California
- Citizenship: United States
- Education: University of California, Riverside; George Washington University School of Medicine, M.D.
- Known for: Patient Safety; Immersive Simulation; Threat Safety Science
- Scientific career
- Fields: Anesthesiology; Critical Care Medicine
- Workplaces: University of Texas MD Anderson Cancer Center

Gregory H. Botz (born 1962) is an intensive care specialist physician at the University of Texas MD Anderson Cancer Center and one of the pioneers of the field of Threat Safety Science. He is a University of Texas System Distinguished Teaching Professor and Professor of Critical Care Medicine at the University of Texas MD Anderson Cancer Center in Houston, Texas. He is the medical director for the University of Texas at Houston Police Department, a center of research and development for threat safety management. He is fellowship-trained as an expert in the use of simulation in healthcare at Stanford University Medical Center where he is an Adjunct Clinical Associate Professor of Anesthesia in the Department of Anesthesiology, Perioperative, and Pain Medicine.

== Early life and education ==
Botz grew up Orange County, California. He graduated from the University of California, Riverside with a Bachelor of Science in Biology. He received his medical doctor degree, M.D., from the George Washington University School of Medicine in 1990.

== Career ==
Following his training at Stanford University, Botz served at the Duke University Medical Center as an associate in the departments of surgery and anesthesia and rose to the rank of assistant professor. After moving to the University of Texas MD Anderson Cancer Center in 1998, his academic responsibilities grew to the level of Professor of Critical Care Medicine at the University of Texas. As the Clinical Medical Director of the Simulation Center since 2013, he has led education programs using simulation.

== Threat Safety R&D ==
Botz, along with his colleagues at MD Anderson, has led the development of the techniques of deliberate practice through immersive simulation of real life scenarios to accelerate the development of life saving competencies. The work has targeted improvement of threat safety management by professional caregivers, law enforcement professionals, and the public. The research and development work is focused on prevention, preparedness, protection, and performance improvement related to manmade threats such as terrorism and natural threats (e.g. storms and earthquakes).

== Medical Tactical Training Program ==
Botz is a founding contributor to the global bystander care training program, called Med Tac, that combines professional expertise and evidence-based techniques from the medical and tactical communities to train people with lifesaving behaviors that can be used in the first few minutes after a life-threatening event and before professional first responders arrive. Botz and the team that created Med Tac were awarded with the Pete Conrad Global Patient Safety Award in 2018 for their work in this area. They lead ongoing training and R&D in Texas, California, Florida, and Hawaii, and the programs have expanded to lifeguards, diving programs, and commercial air travel.

== See also ==
- Patient Safety
- Medical Simulation
- Medical error
- Patient safety
