= Pete Conrad =

American astronaut and lunar explorer (1930–1999)

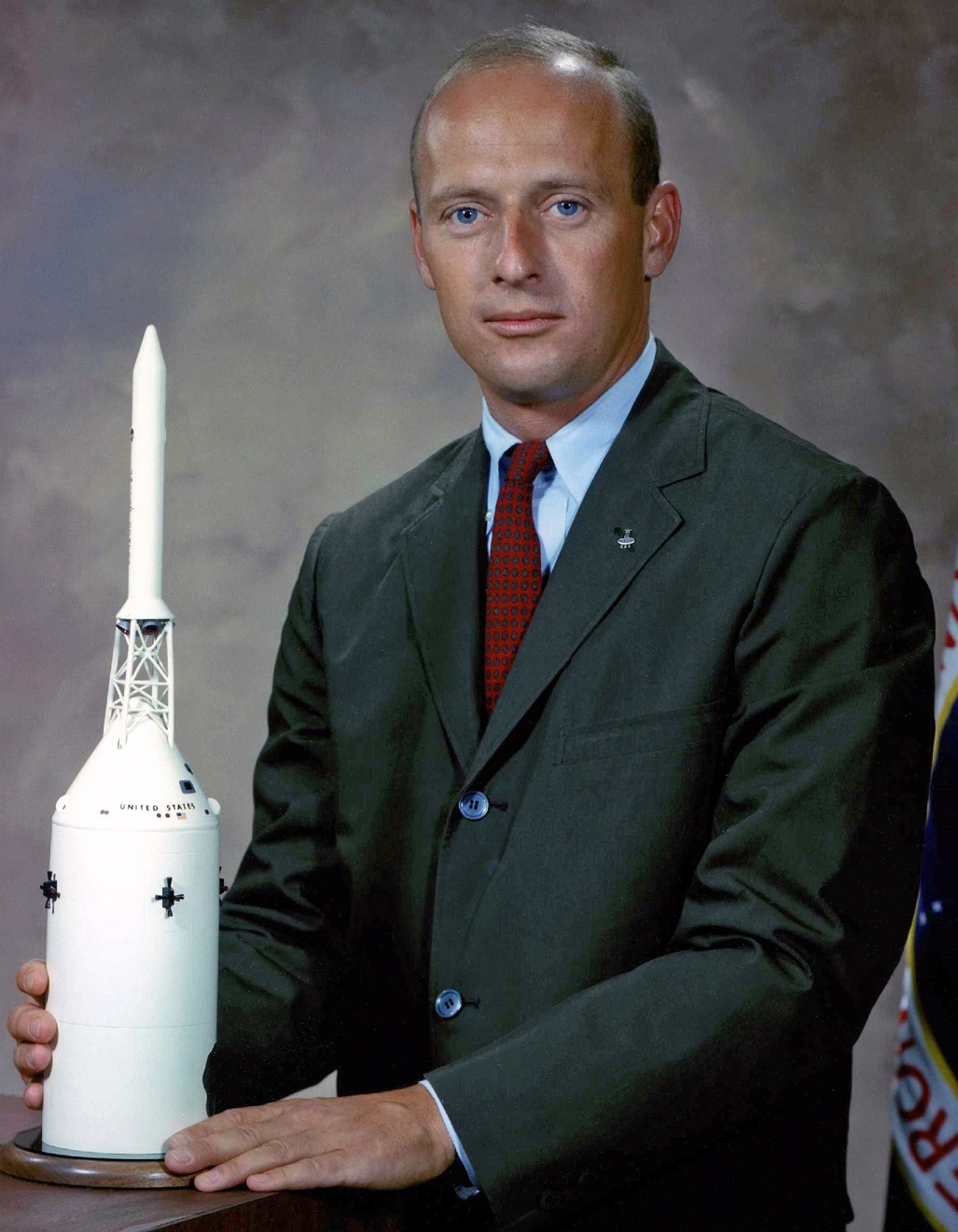
- Conrad in 1964
- Born: Charles Conrad Jr. June 2, 1930; Philadelphia, Pennsylvania, U.S.
- Died: July 8, 1999 (aged 69); Ojai, California, U.S.
- Resting place: Arlington National Cemetery
- Education: Princeton University (BS)
- Spouses: Jane DuBose (m. 1953; div. 1988) Nancy Crane (m. 1990)
- Children: 4
- Awards: Distinguished Flying Cross (2); Navy Distinguished Service Medal (2); NASA Distinguished Service Medal (2); NASA Exceptional Service Medal (2); Congressional Space Medal of Honor; Collier Trophy; Harmon Trophy; Navy Astronaut Wings; Gagarin Gold Space Medal (Fédération Aéronautique Internationale)
- Space career

NASA astronaut
- Rank: Captain, USN
- Time in space: 49d 3h 38m
- Selection: NASA Group 2 (1962)
- Total EVAs: 4
- Total EVA time: 12h 46m: 7h 45m (lunar surface); 5h 1m (Earth orbit)
- Mission: Gemini 5; Gemini 11; Apollo 12; Skylab 2
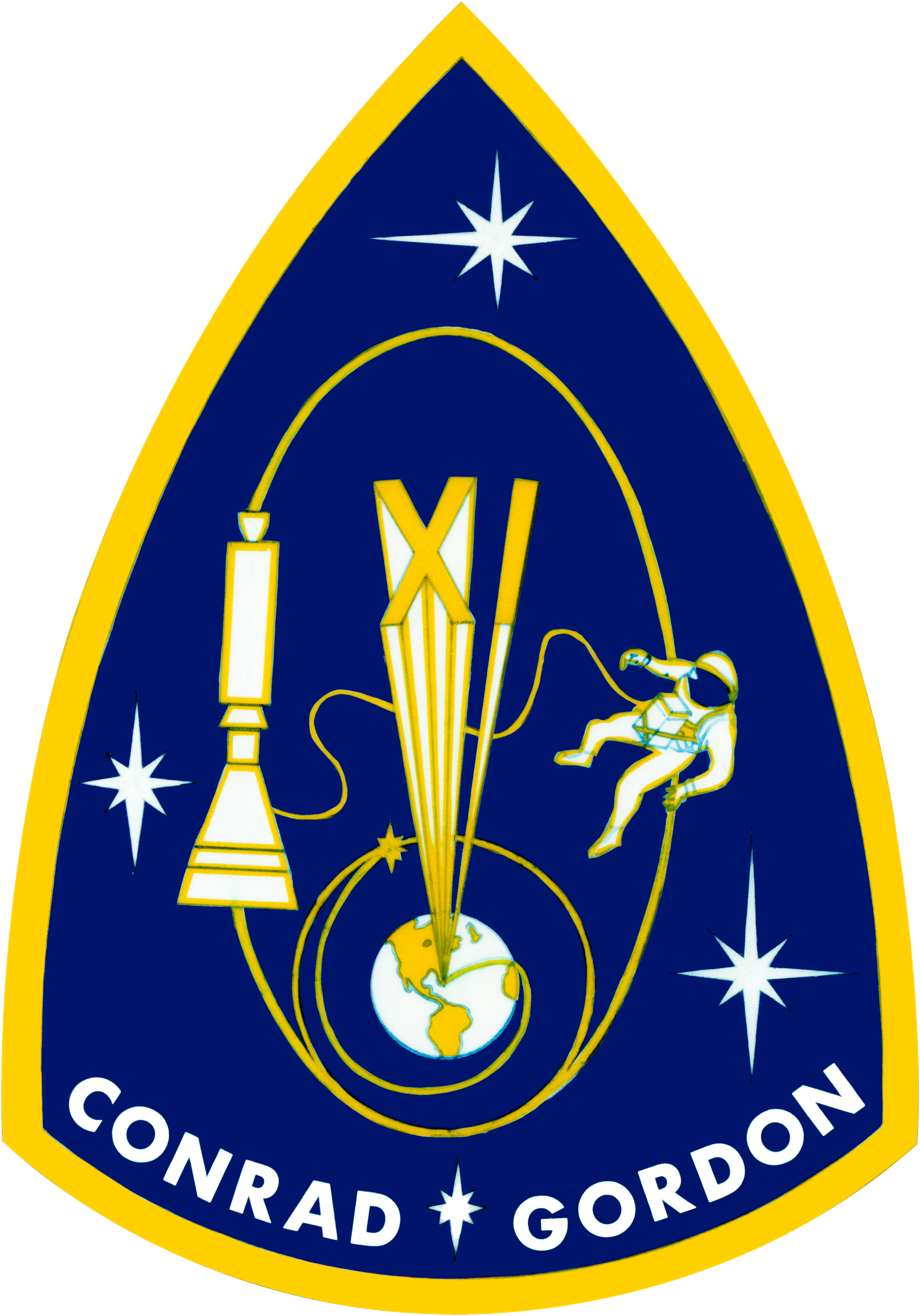
- Mission insignia
- Retired: December 1973

Charles "Pete" Conrad Jr. (June 2, 1930 – July 8, 1999) was an American NASA astronaut, aeronautical engineer, naval officer, aviator, and test pilot who commanded the Apollo 12 mission, on which he became the third person to walk on the Moon. Conrad was selected for NASA's second astronaut class in 1962.

Conrad was born in Philadelphia, Pennsylvania. Despite having dyslexia, he earned a Bachelor of Science degree in aeronautical engineering from Princeton University—which later made him the first Ivy League astronaut—and joined the U.S. Navy. In 1954, Conrad received his naval aviator wings, served as a fighter pilot and, after graduating from the U.S. Naval Test Pilot School (Class 20), as a project test pilot. In 1959, he was an astronaut candidate for Project Mercury.

Conrad set an eight-day space endurance record in 1965 along with his Command Pilot Gordon Cooper on his first spaceflight, Gemini 5. Later, Conrad commanded Gemini 11 in 1966, and Apollo 12 in 1969. After Apollo, he commanded Skylab 2, the first crewed Skylab mission, in 1973. On the mission, he and his crewmates repaired significant launch damage to the Skylab space station. For this, President Jimmy Carter awarded him the Congressional Space Medal of Honor in 1978.

After Conrad retired from NASA and the Navy in 1973, he became a vice president of American Television and Communications Company. He went on to work for McDonnell Douglas, where he served as vice president of marketing, senior vice president of marketing, staff vice president of international business development, and vice president of project development. Conrad died in 1999 from internal injuries sustained in a motorcycle accident, aged 69.

== Early life and education ==
Charles Conrad Jr. was born on June 2, 1930, in Philadelphia, the third child and the first son of Charles Conrad Sr. and Frances De Rappelage Conrad (née Vinson), into a well-to-do real estate and banking family.

The Great Depression wiped out the Conrad family's fortune, just as it had those of so many others. In 1942, the family lost their manor home in Philadelphia, and then moved into a small carriage house, paid for by Frances's brother, Egerton Vinson. Eventually, Charles Sr., broken down by financial failures, left his family.

Conrad was considered a bright, intelligent boy, but he continually struggled with his schoolwork. He had dyslexia, a condition little understood at the time. Conrad attended the Haverford School, a private academy in Haverford, Pennsylvania, that previous generations of Conrads had attended. Even after his family's financial downturn, his uncle Egerton supported his continued schooling at Haverford. However, Pete's dyslexia continued to frustrate his academic efforts. After he failed most of his 11th grade exams, Haverford expelled him from school.

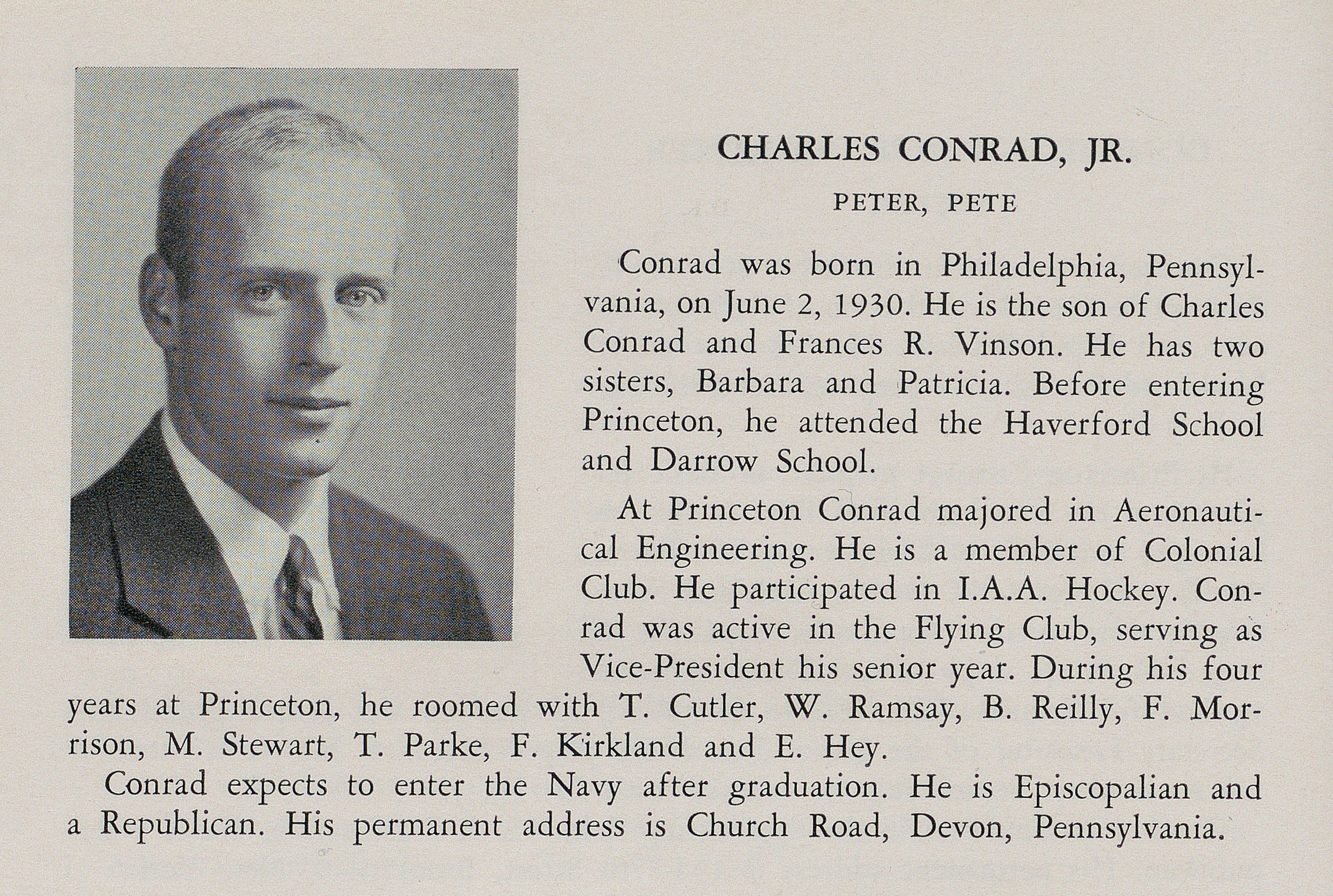
Conrad in the Princeton University yearbook, 1953

Conrad's mother refused to believe that her son was unintelligent, and she set about finding him a suitable school. She found Darrow School in New Lebanon, New York. There, Conrad learned how to apply a systems approach to learning, and thus found a way to work around his dyslexia. Despite having to repeat the 11th grade, Conrad so excelled at Darrow that after his graduation in 1949, he not only was admitted to Princeton University, but he was also awarded a full Navy ROTC scholarship. While at Darrow, although he was only 5 feet 6 inches (1.68 m) and weighed 135 pounds (61 kg), Conrad started as the center on his football team and became the team captain. "He was a very tough boy, and we won our share of games," said the school's assistant headmaster.

Starting when he was 15 years old, Conrad worked during the summertime at the Paoli Airfield near Paoli, Pennsylvania, bartering lawn mowing, sweeping, and other odd jobs for airplane flights and occasional instructional time. He learned more about the mechanics and workings of aircraft and aircraft engines, and then he graduated to minor maintenance work. When he was 16, he drove almost 100 miles (160 km) to help a flight instructor whose airplane had been forced to make an emergency landing. Conrad repaired the plane single-handedly. Thereafter, the instructor gave Conrad the flight lessons that he needed to earn his pilot's certificate even before he graduated from high school.

Conrad continued flying while he was in college, not only keeping his pilot's certificate, but also earning an instrument flight rating. He graduated with a Bachelor of Science degree in aeronautical engineering from Princeton in 1953, after completing a 200-page-long senior thesis titled "The Design of a Turbo-Jet Military Advanced Trainer" with Richard V. Warden, Richard W. Vannata, and Calvin H. Perrine. He was commissioned an ensign in the U.S. Navy as a Naval ROTC graduate.

== Aviation career in the U.S. Navy ==
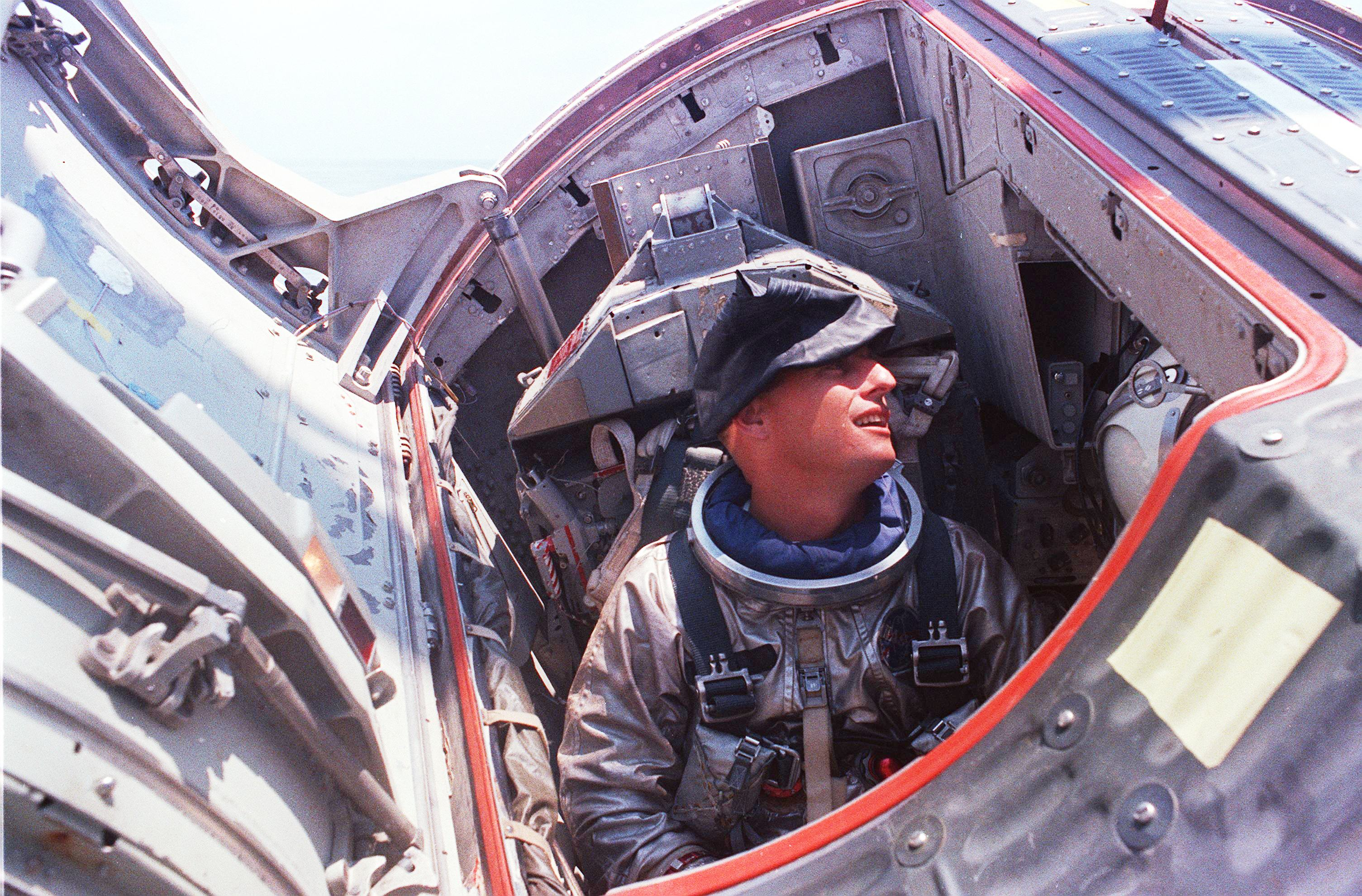
Conrad preparing for water egress training in the Gemini Static Article 5 spacecraft

Following his commission in 1953, Conrad was sent to Naval Air Station Pensacola, Florida, for flight training. He was also trained at the Naval Air Station Corpus Christi, Texas. He was designated a Naval Aviator in September 1954 and became a fighter pilot. He excelled in Navy flight school, and he served for several years as an aircraft carrier-based fighter pilot in the Navy. Conrad also served as a flight instructor in Navy flight schools along the Gulf of Mexico.

Next, Conrad applied for and was accepted by the United States Naval Test Pilot School at Naval Air Station Patuxent River in Patuxent, Maryland. His classmates were future fellow astronauts Wally Schirra and Jim Lovell. He graduated in 1958, as part of Class 20, and was assigned as a Project Test Pilot. Conrad became a captain in the U.S. Navy on December 11, 1969.

During this period, Conrad was invited to take part in the selection process for the first group of astronauts for the National Aeronautics and Space Administration (NASA) (the "Mercury Seven"). Conrad, like his fellow candidates, underwent several days of what they considered to be invasive, demeaning, and unnecessary medical and psychological testing at the Lovelace Clinic in New Mexico. Unlike his fellow candidates, Conrad rebelled against the regimen. During a Rorschach inkblot test, he told the psychiatrist that one blot card revealed a sexual encounter complete with lurid detail. When shown a blank card, he turned it around, pushed it back and replied, "It's upside down".

Then when he was asked to deliver a stool sample to the onsite lab, he placed it in a gift box and tied a red ribbon around it. Eventually, he decided that he had had enough. After dropping his full enema bag on the desk of the clinic's commanding officer, he walked out. His initial application to NASA was denied with the notation not suitable for long-duration flight.

After his NASA episode, Conrad returned to the Navy as a fighter pilot, serving in the Pacific Fleet's second operational F-4 Phantom II squadron, VF-96, on board USS Ranger. Thereafter, when NASA announced its search for a second group of astronauts, Mercury veteran Alan Shepard, who knew Conrad from their time as naval aviators and test pilots, approached Conrad and persuaded him to reapply. This time, Conrad found the medical tests less invasive, and in June 1962 he was selected to join NASA.

He logged more than 6,500 hours of flying time, with more than 5,000 hours in jet aircraft.

== NASA career ==
=== Project Gemini ===
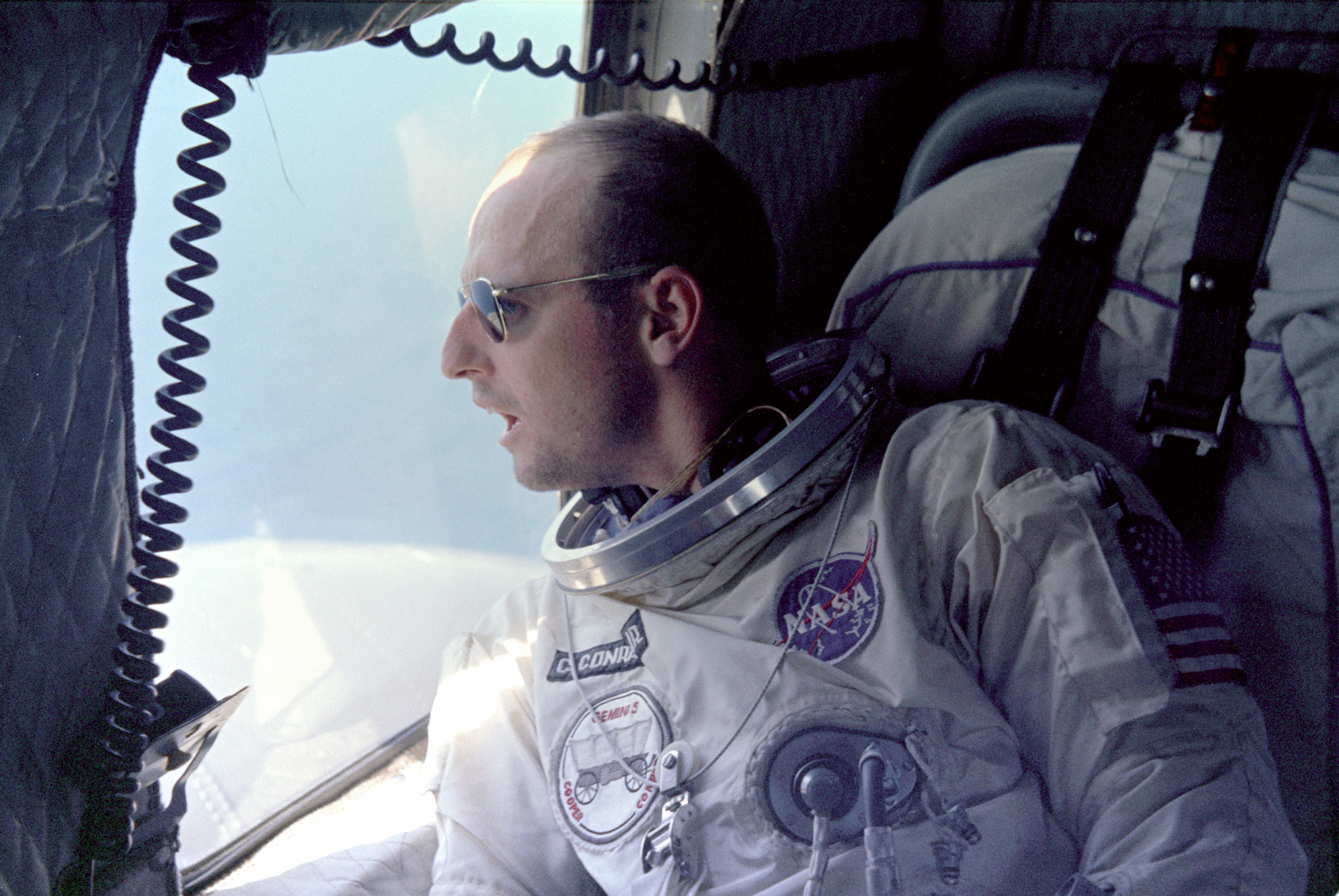
Conrad following his Gemini 5 flight

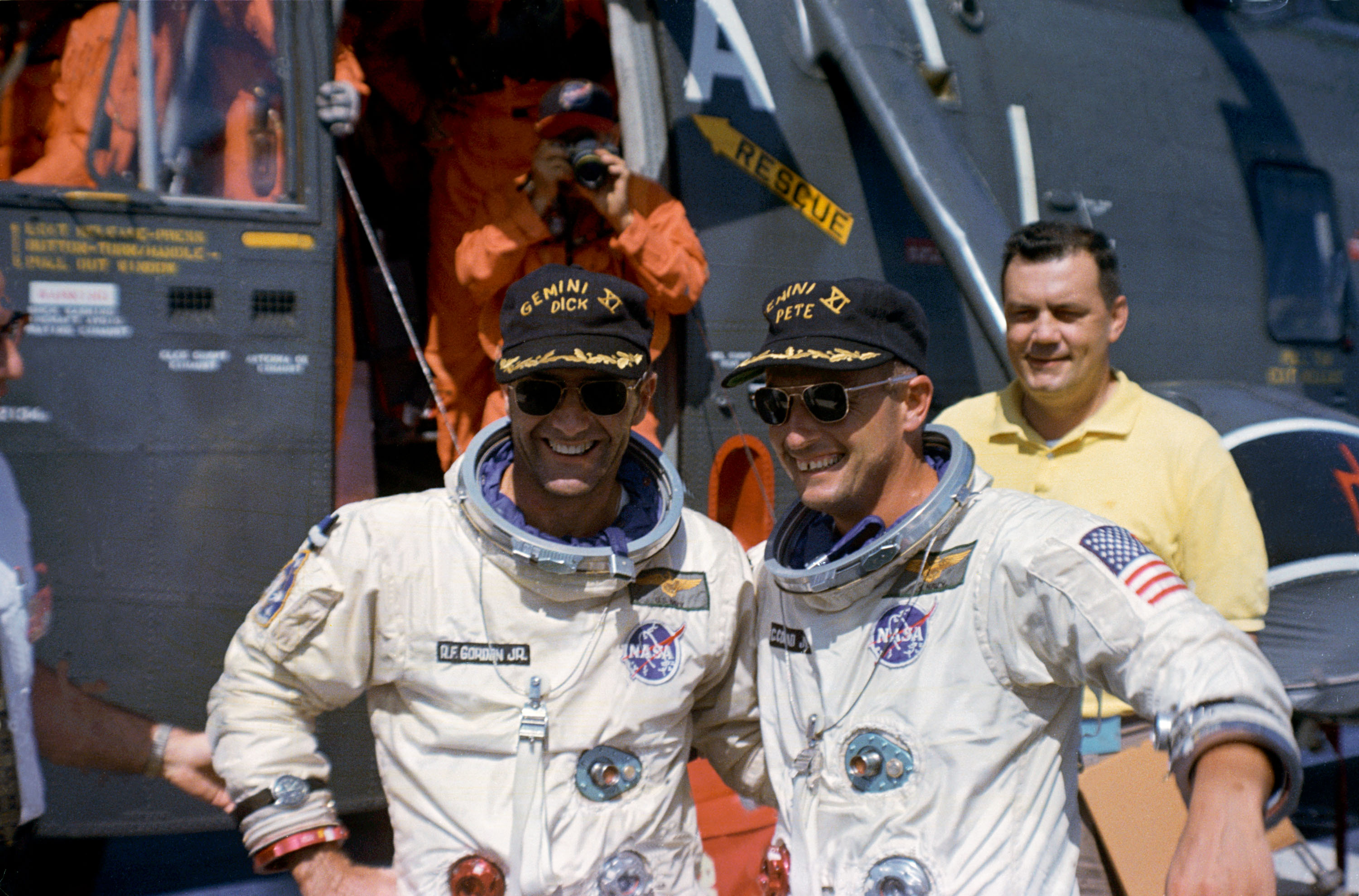
Conrad (right) with his Gemini 11 crewmate Dick Gordon, following their flight

Conrad joined NASA as part of the second group of astronauts, known as the New Nine, on September 17, 1962. Regarded as one of the best pilots in the group, he was among the first of his group to be assigned a Gemini mission. As pilot of Gemini 5 he, along with his commander Gordon Cooper, set a new space endurance record of eight days. The duration of the Gemini 5 flight was actually 7 days 22 hours and 55 minutes, surpassing the then-current Russian record of five days. Eight days was the time required for the first crewed lunar landing missions. Conrad facetiously referred to the Gemini 5 capsule as a flying garbage can.

Conrad tested many spacecraft systems essential to the Apollo program. He was also one of the smallest of the astronauts, 5 feet 6 1/2 inches (1.689 meters) tall, so he found the confinement of the Gemini capsule less onerous than his Commander Gordon Cooper did. He was then named commander of the Gemini 8 backup crew, and later commander of Gemini 11 with pilot Richard Gordon. Gemini 11 docked with an Agena target vehicle immediately after achieving orbit. Such a maneuver was an engineering and flight test similar to what the Apollo Command Module (CM) and Lunar Module (LM) would later be required to do. Also, the Gemini 11 flight holds the distinction of being the highest-apogee crewed Earth orbit ever, reaching an apogee of 1,369 kilometers (851 miles).

=== Apollo program ===
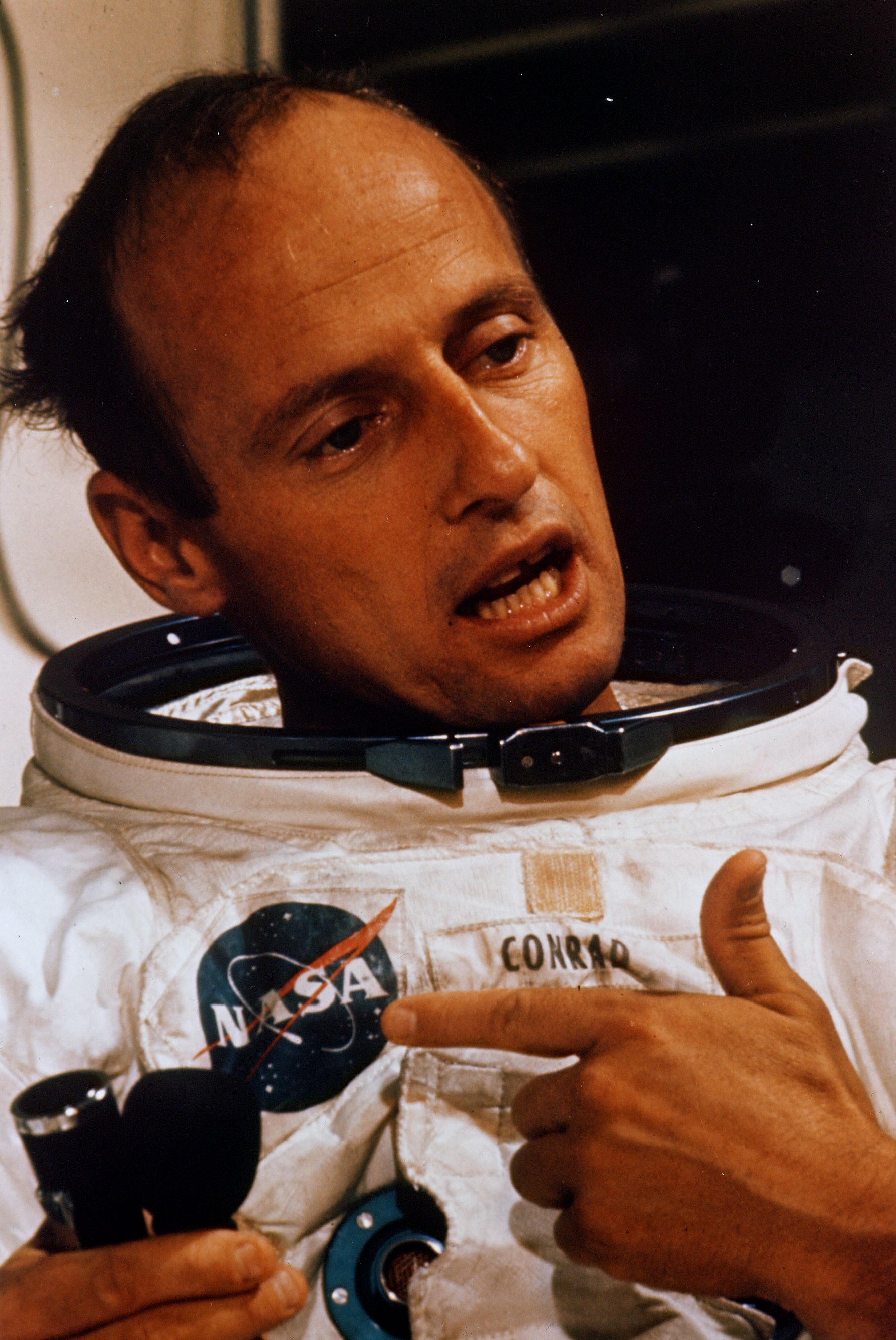
Conrad during his Apollo 12 EVA training

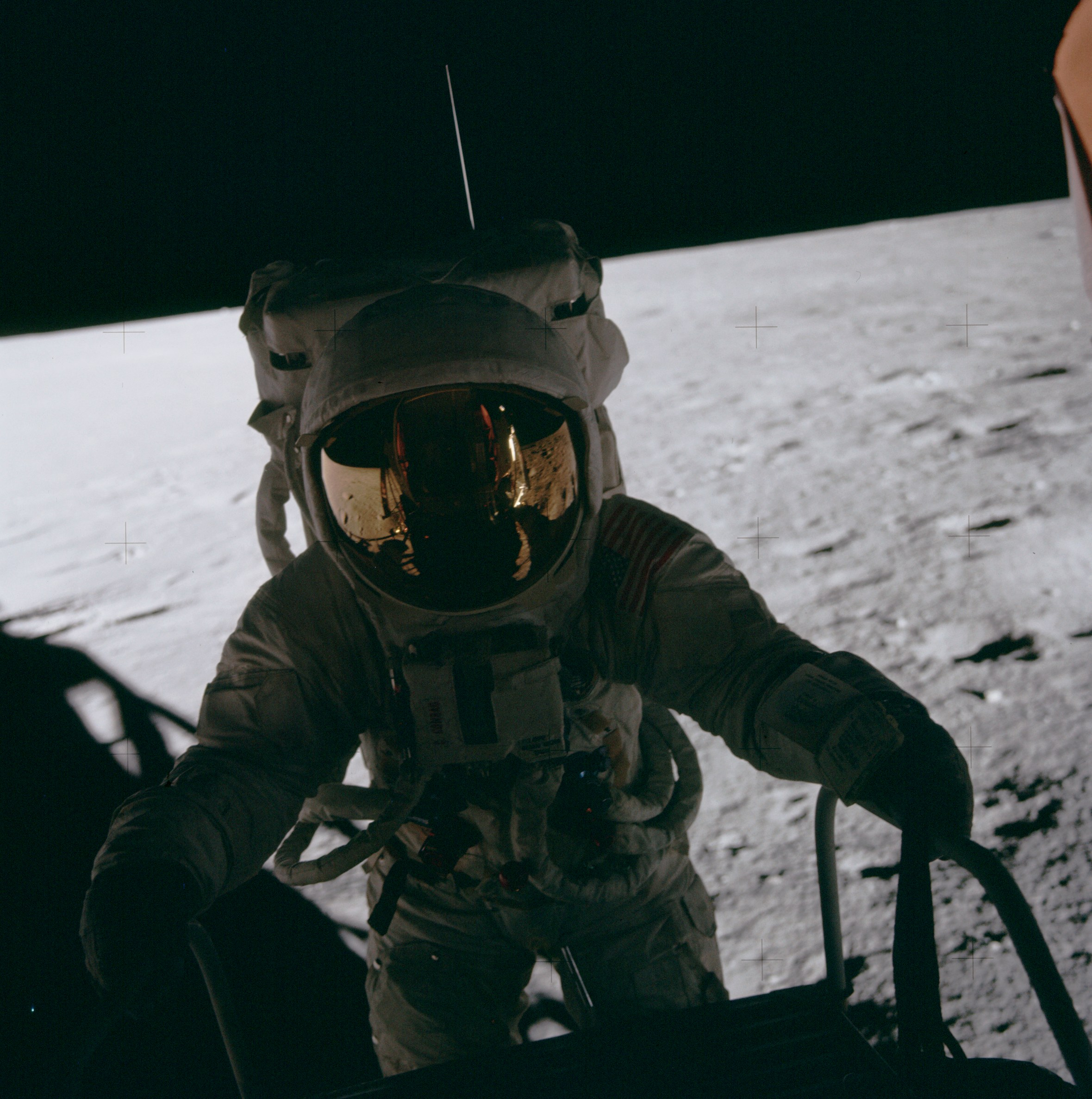
Conrad descends the Lunar Module ladder, moments before becoming the third human to walk on the Moon

Pete Conrad's quote while descending the LEM ladder

Conrad was assigned in December 1966 to command the backup crew for the first Earth orbital test flight of the complete Apollo spacecraft, including the Lunar Module (LM) into low Earth orbit. Delays in the LM's development pushed this mission to December 1968 as Apollo 8. But when one more delay occurred in readying the first LM for crewed flight, NASA approved and scheduled a lunar orbit mission without the LM as Apollo 8, pushing Conrad's backup mission to Apollo 9 in March 1969. Director of Flight Crew Operations Deke Slayton's practice was to assign a backup crew as the prime crew on the third following mission. If the swap of 8 and 9 had not occurred, Conrad might have commanded Apollo 11, the first mission to land on the Moon.

On November 14, 1969, Apollo 12 was launched with Conrad as commander, Dick Gordon as Command Module Pilot, and Alan Bean as Lunar Module Pilot. The launch was the most harrowing of the Apollo program, as a series of lightning strikes just after liftoff temporarily knocked out power and guidance in the Command Module. Five days later, after stepping down from the ladder of the Lunar Module onto a landing pad, Conrad joked about his own small stature by remarking:

Whoopee! Man, that may have been a small one for Neil, but that's a long one for me.

— Pete Conrad

He later revealed that he said this in order to win a bet he had made with the Italian journalist Oriana Fallaci for $500 to prove that NASA did not script astronaut comments. Fallaci was convinced that Armstrong's "One small step for man" statement had been written for him and was not his own words.

Conrad's "long one" referred to the jump from the Lunar Module's ladder to a landing pad, whereas Armstrong's "small step" referred to the small step from the landing pad onto the Moon's surface. Conrad's first words on the lunar surface were:

Oooh, is that soft and queasy.

— Pete Conrad

One of the photos that Conrad took during the mission with his own image visible on the helmet visor of Alan Bean was later listed on Popular Science's photo gallery of the best astronaut selfies.

=== Skylab ===
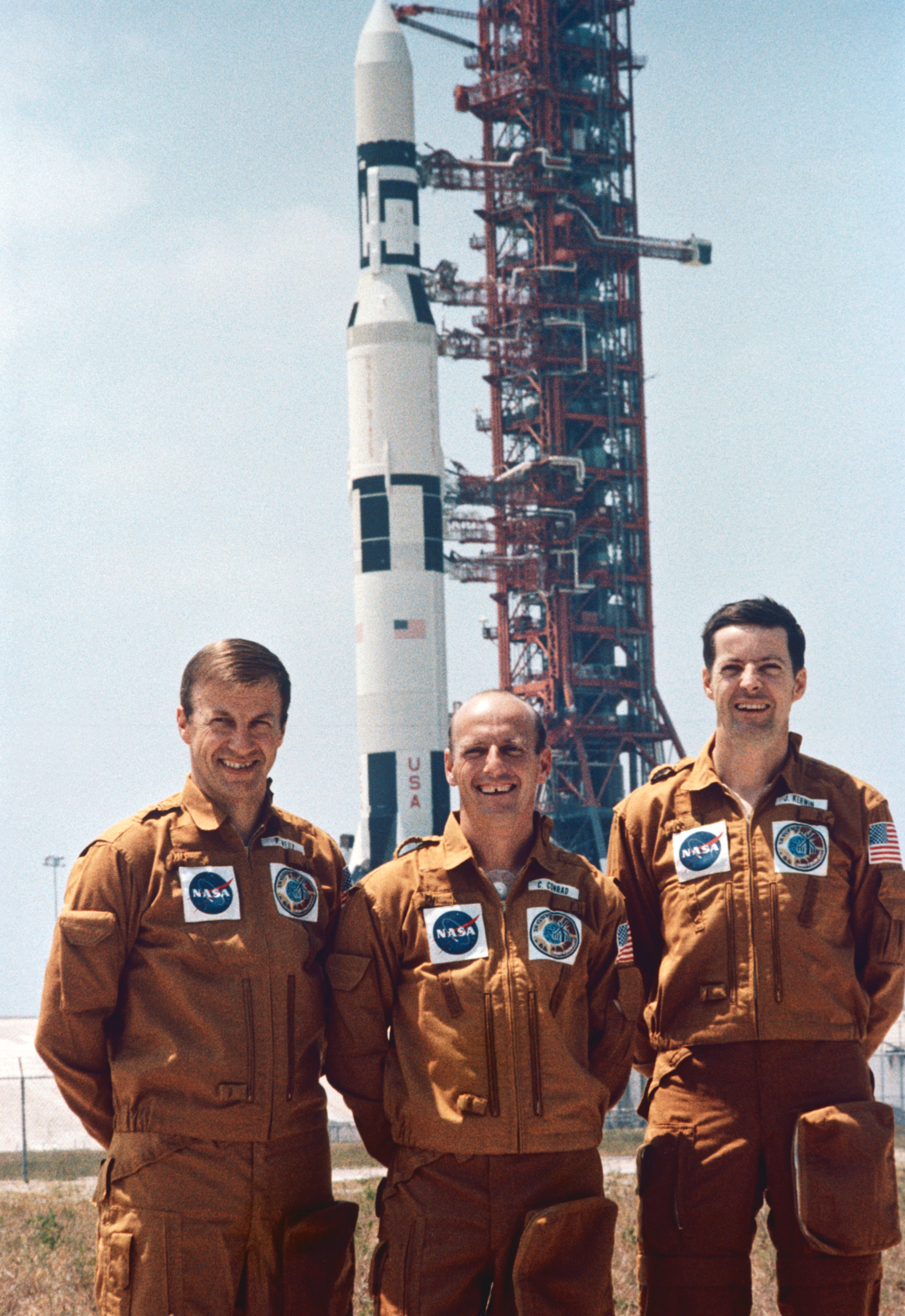
Paul J. Weitz, (left) Charles Conrad Jr. (middle); and Joseph P. Kerwin (right); America's first space station crew would spend 28 days in space

Conrad's final mission was as commander of Skylab 2, the first crew to board the Skylab space station. The station had been damaged on its uncrewed launch, when its micrometeoroid shield tore away, taking one of two main solar panels with it and jamming the other one so that it could not deploy. Conrad and his crew repaired the damage on two spacewalks. Conrad managed to pull free the stuck solar panel by sheer brute force, an action of which he was particularly proud. The astronauts also erected a "parasol" solar shield to protect the station from intense solar heating, a function which the lost micrometeoroid shield was supposed to perform. Without the shield, Skylab and its contents would have become unusable. President Jimmy Carter honored Conrad for this in 1978 by awarding him the Congressional Space Medal of Honor.

During his training for Skylab 2, Conrad had to bail out from NASA T-38 N957NA on May 10, 1972. He was returning to Houston from a visit to ILC Industries in Delaware. On approach to Ellington AFB, he was advised that the weather had deteriorated below minimums so he diverted to Hobby. During the night, instrument flight rules (IFR) descent, he suffered a generator failure at 800 feet and broke off the approach. He elected to divert to an airfield with better weather. He ran out of fuel as he reached Bergstrom AFB and was forced to eject at 3,700 feet. He landed about 100 yards from the base operations building and his airplane crashed in an open field about two miles away.

== Post-NASA career ==
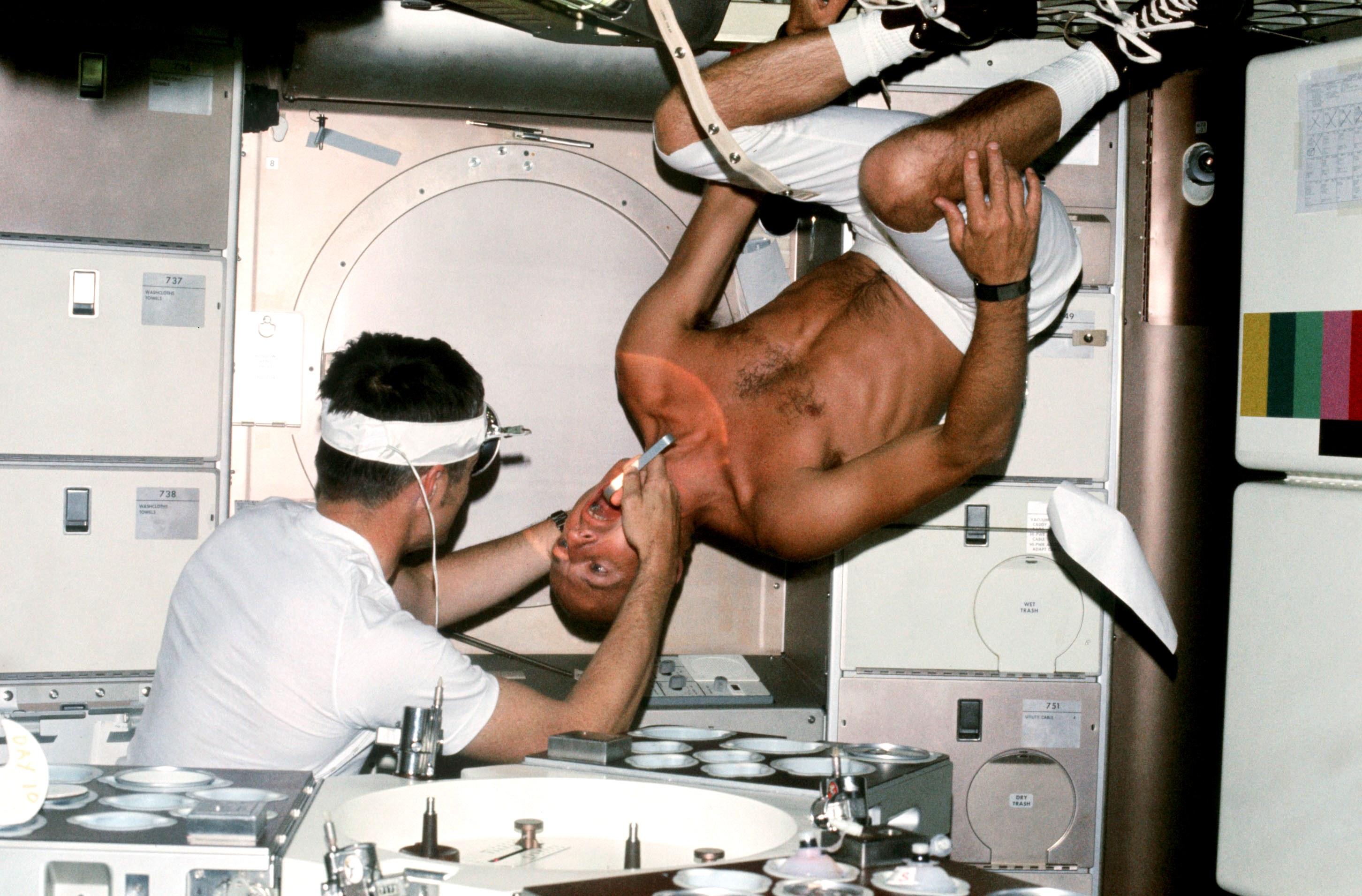
Conrad undergoes a dental exam by Skylab 2 Science Pilot, Joseph P. Kerwin, M.D.

Conrad retired from NASA and the Navy in 1973, and went to work for American Television and Communications Company. He started as the vice president of operations and chief operating officer. Conrad was in charge of the operation of existing systems and the national development of new cable television systems.

In 1976, Conrad accepted a position with McDonnell Douglas as a vice president and consultant. In 1978, he became vice president of marketing and was responsible for the commercial and military sales of Douglas Aircraft Company. After an engine fell off a McDonnell Douglas DC-10, causing it to crash with the loss of all passengers and crew in 1979, Conrad spearheaded McDonnell Douglas's ultimately unsuccessful efforts to allay the fears of the public and policymakers, and save the plane's reputation. In 1980, he was promoted to senior vice president of marketing. From 1982 to 1984, Conrad served as the senior vice president of marketing and product support. He was appointed staff vice president of international business development in 1984. During the 1990s he consulted for the Delta Clipper experimental single-stage-to-orbit launch vehicle. He became vice president of project development in 1993.

On February 14, 1996, Conrad was part of the crew on a record-breaking around-the-world flight in a Learjet owned by cable TV pioneer Bill Daniels. The flight lasted 49 hours, 26 minutes and 8 seconds. Today the jet is on permanent static display at Denver International Airport's Terminal C.

A month before he died, Conrad appeared on ABC News Nightline and said, "I think the Space Shuttle is worth one billion dollars a launch. I think that it is worth two billion dollars for what it does. I think the Shuttle is worth it for the work it does." In the last interview he gave before his death, Conrad sat down for PBS's Nova series and discussed where he felt the future direction of space travel should go. He considered returning to the Moon "a waste of taxpayer money", but recommended missions to Mars and asteroids.

In 2006, NASA posthumously awarded him the Ambassador of Exploration Award for his work for the agency and science.

== Personal life ==
When you can't be good, be colorful.

— Conrad's personal motto.

While at Princeton, Conrad met Jane DuBose, a student at Bryn Mawr, whose family owned a 1,600-acre (650 ha) ranch near Uvalde, Texas. Her father, Winn DuBose, was the first person to call Conrad "Pete" rather than "Peter", the name he had used since birth. Upon his graduation from Princeton and acceptance of his navy commission, Conrad and Jane were married on June 16, 1953. They had four sons.

Given the demands of his career in the Navy and NASA, Conrad and Jane spent considerable time apart, and Conrad saw less of his sons than he would have liked. In 1988, Conrad and Jane divorced, both later remarrying.

In 1989, Conrad's youngest son, Christopher, was diagnosed with a malignant lymphoma. He died in April 1990, at the age of 29.

Conrad met Nancy Crane, a Denver divorcee, through mutual friends. Conrad and Crane married in 1990.

Conrad was a Cub Scout. His recreational interests included golf, water skiing and auto racing, such as Formula Vee.

== Death ==
Conrad died on July 8, 1999, from internal injuries sustained in a motorcycle accident. While traveling with his wife and friends from his Huntington Beach home to Monterey, California, his motorcycle crashed on a turn. Conrad later died in a hospital in Ojai. He was wearing a helmet at the time and was operating within the speed limit. He was buried with full honours at Arlington National Cemetery, with many Apollo-era astronauts in attendance and a performance of "Amazing Grace" by music legend Willie Nelson.

The Lyndon B. Johnson Space Center in Houston, Texas, has a grove of trees that have been planted to honor the memory of the astronauts who have died. After Conrad's death, NASA planted a tree in his honor. During the dedication ceremony, his Apollo 12 crewmate Alan Bean used his speech to lighten the sombre occasion by injecting a little levity, pretending to "channel" Conrad's instructions from the hereafter. Bean said Conrad wanted NASA to light his tree every Christmas season with coloured lights instead of the white used for everyone else, in keeping with his motto "when you can't be good, be colourful". NASA has honoured this request, and every Christmas since then, all of the trees in the grove have been lit with white lights—except Conrad's tree, which has been lit with red lights.

== Awards and honors ==
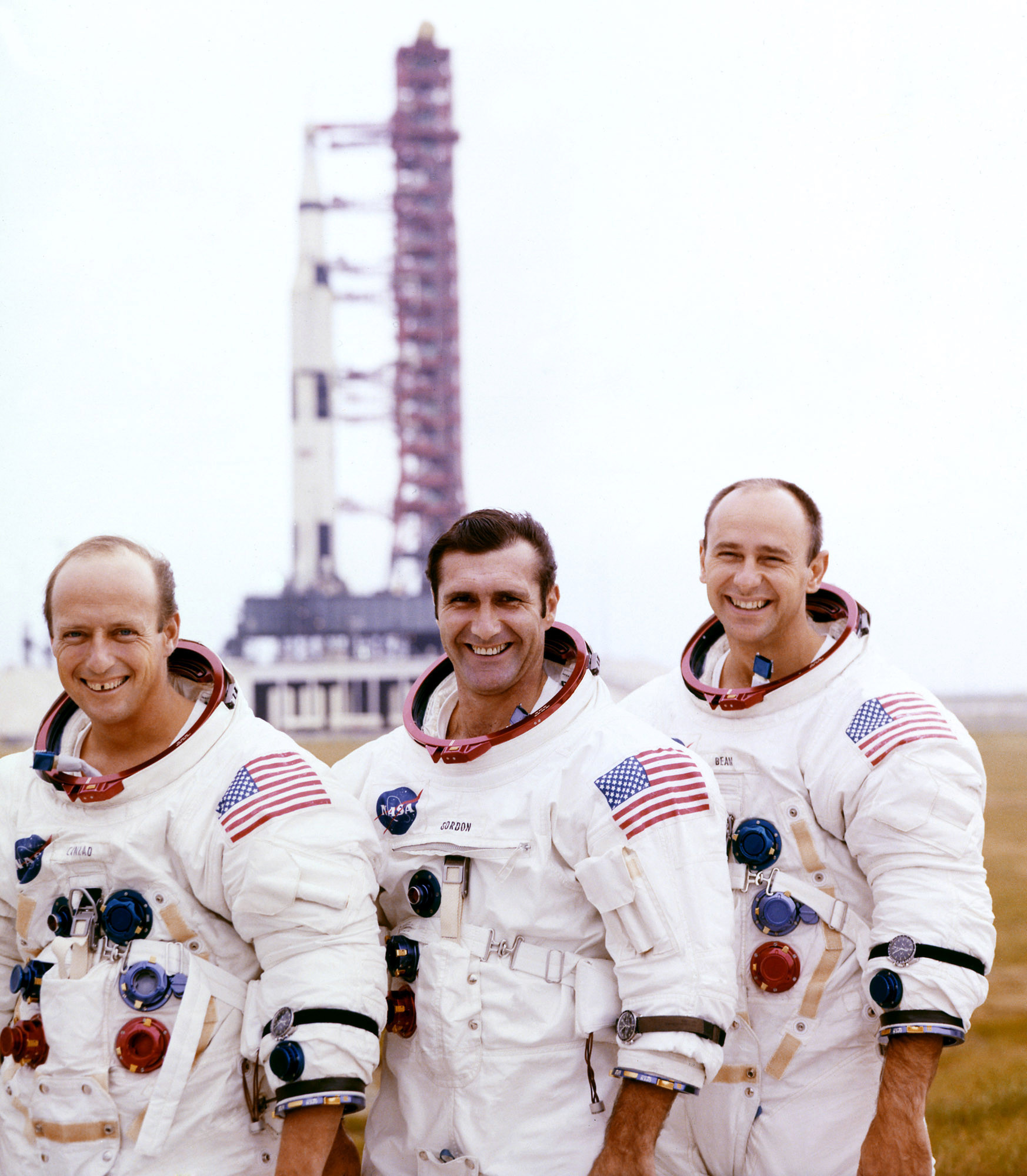
Conrad, Dick Gordon, and Alan Bean pose with their Apollo 12 Saturn V Moon rocket in the background.

- Two Navy Distinguished Service Medals
- Two Distinguished Flying Crosses
- Congressional Space Medal of Honor (1978)
- Two NASA Distinguished Service Medals
- Two NASA Exceptional Service Medals
- Yuri Gagarin Gold Space Medal (Fédération Aéronautique Internationale)
- Harmon Trophy (1974)
- Thompson Trophy (1974)

He is inducted into several Aviation and Astronaut Halls of Fame. In 1980 he was inducted into the National Aviation Hall of Fame. He was one of ten Gemini astronauts inducted into the International Space Hall of Fame in 1982. Conrad and his fellow Gemini astronauts were inducted into the U.S. Astronaut Hall of Fame in 1993. Conrad was presented an honorary Master of Arts degree from Princeton in 1966; an Honorary Doctor of Laws degree from Lincoln-Wesleyan University in 1970, and an Honorary Doctor of Science degree from Kings College in Wilkes-Barre, Pennsylvania, in 1971.

The three Skylab astronaut crews were awarded the 1973 Robert J. Collier Trophy "For proving beyond question the value of man in future explorations of space and the production of data of benefit to all the people on Earth." Gerald Carr accepted the 1975 Dr. Robert H. Goddard Memorial Trophy from President Ford, awarded to the Skylab astronauts. They were awarded AIAA's 1974 Haley Astronautics Award.

Conrad was a fellow of the American Astronautical Society; New York Academy of Sciences; American Institute of Aeronautics and Astronautics, and the Society of Experimental Test Pilots.

== In popular media ==
Conrad appeared as a spokesman for American Express

Conrad was discussed at length in Tom Wolfe's 1979 book, The Right Stuff, about the pilots engaged in U.S. postwar research about rockets, although he was never mentioned in the 1983 film version. He played a news commentator in the 1975 made-for-TV movie Stowaway to the Moon, appeared as himself in a 1987 episode of It’s Garry Shandling’s Show, and himself in the 1991 television movie Plymouth, about a fictional lunar base, and in an American Express television commercial.

In the 1995 film Apollo 13, Conrad was played by David Andrews; in the 1998 HBO miniseries From the Earth to the Moon, by Peter Scolari and Paul McCrane; in the 2018 film First Man, by Ethan Embry, and in the 2019 alternate history web television series For All Mankind by Steven Pritchard.

== Bibliography ==
- Chaikin, Andrew (1994). A man on the moon : the voyages of the Apollo astronauts. New York: Viking. ISBN 978-0-670-81446-6. OCLC 29548704.
- Conrad, Nancy (2005). Rocket man : astronaut Pete Conrad's incredible ride to the moon and beyond. New York: New American Library. ISBN 978-0-451-21509-3. OCLC 57311427.
- Slayton, Donald (1995). Deke! : U.S. manned space, from Mercury to the shuttle. New York: Forge. ISBN 978-0-312-85918-3. OCLC 42051303.
