= University of Texas Police at Houston =

Coordinates: 29.707217°N 95.396905°W

The University of Texas Police at Houston
- Common name: UT Police at Houston
- Abbreviation: UTPD

Agency overview
- Formed: December 8, 1967

Jurisdictional structure
- General nature: Local civilian police

Operational structure
- Headquarters: 7777 Knight Road, Houston, TX 77054
- Agency executive: William H. Adcox, Chief of Department

Notables
- Person: Vicki King, for Inspector, Threat Assessment & Intervention
- Significant operation: Threat Assessment Unit

Website
- https://www.utph.org

The University of Texas Police at Houston (UT Police at Houston) is a full-service police department that serves the communities of the University of Texas Health Science Center at Houston (UTHealth) and the M.D. Anderson Cancer Center. UT Police at Houston patrols the Texas Medical Center and has property in surrounding counties.

== Early history and foundation ==
The need for a professional police force for the University of Texas became clear after the University of Texas Tower Shooting on August 1, 1966 when Charles Whitman killed 14 people and injured thirty-one on the University of Texas at Austin campus. In 1967, The Texas Legislature passed SB 162 which authorized university campuses in Texas to hire and commission police officers. Following that decision, the UT System Board of Regents created the UT System Police to oversee the hiring, training and certification of police officer personnel at each of the UT System components.

== Training and jurisdiction ==
UT Police at Houston was the first university police department in the state of Texas to receive Commission on Accreditation for Law Enforcement Agencies certification. It currently has 300+ employees, making it one of the largest university police departments in the State and one of the largest agencies in Harris County. The agency employs civilian staff (technical service, guards, dispatchers) and Police Officers. Officers attend a six-month academy in Austin at the University of Texas Police Academy.

As with any university police agency, officers have jurisdiction in any county within the state of Texas in which the University of Texas has property that is owned, leased, rented, or otherwise under the control of the institution.

The current Chief of Police is William H. Adcox who formerly served with the El Paso Police Department and the University of Texas at El Paso.

== Threat management unit ==
Under the leadership of the current Chief of Police, William H. Adcox, UT Police at Houston created a threat management unit whose actions have resulted in a threefold increase in early intervention reporting between 2012 and 2014. The unit is led by Inspector Vicki King. UT Police at Houston officers are trained to evaluate dynamic situations in order to engage individuals and provide help before a situation turns violent or deadly. Reports indicate that hospital employees feel more comfortable reporting concerning behavior so officers can get these individuals help before their behavior escalates to criminal activity or harm to themselves or others. The unit was involved in 11 suicide interventions in a four-month period where the people investigated were held under an emergency detention order and given psychiatric care. During that same four-month period, the unit intervened in 18 cases in which the subject was considered to be at high risk for committing a violent act.
