= Sorrel King =

American patient safety advocate

Sorrel King is an author, patient safety advocate, and president/co-founder of the Josie King Foundation. Her 18-month old daughter, Josie, died at Johns Hopkins Bayview Hospital of dehydration due to medical error after being hospitalized for second-degree burns. Following a financial settlement from Johns Hopkins, Sorrel King started the Josie King Foundation and wrote a novel about her experience entitled Josie's Story: A Mother's Inspiring Crusade to Make Medical Care Safe.

== Biography ==
Sorrel King had four children: Jack, Eva, Relly, and Josie. She attended the University of Colorado where she met her husband and father of her children, Tony. The family originally lived in Richmond, Virginia before moving to Baltimore County for her husband's job as a stock-trader at Wachovia Securities. Sorrel King originally worked as a designer. She successfully started a women's clothing line that was sold at Barney's and Saks Fifth Avenue, among others. After her daughter's death, she became an author and internationally recognized patient safety advocate. She was founder and President of the Josie King Foundation. In 2008, she was awarded the PPAG Advocacy Award from the Pediatric Pharmacy Association for her advocacy work.

== Backstory ==
On January 23, 2001, Josie King (18 months old) suffered an accident in a hot bath she accidentally drew for herself, which resulted in second-degree burns on 60% of her body. Sorrel King called an ambulance that took her to Johns Hopkins Hospital Bayview Center. Her daughter was treated with skin grafts, intravenous fluids, and pain medications. Her daughter improved rapidly and was moved to the Intermediate Care Unit.

Although her vital signs were normal and her burns continued healing, she developed a high fever, vomiting, and diarrhea. The blood, stool, and urine tests the doctors conducted came back with no indication of another underlying illness. The doctors decided her central line, through which her fluids were being administered, could have an infection and subsequently removed it. Her daughter's condition worsened. Josie began to suck on the washcloth when given her bath and at night, her eyes began rolling back into her head.

Sorrel attempted to give her daughter fluids but the nurse warned against it and explained that her vital signs were normal. Sorrel asked for a physician to come see her daughter and her request was denied. Sorrel returned to the hospital at 5:30 A.M. and found her daughter in worse condition. The doctors gave Josie a shot of Narcan and ordered that no more narcotics be administered. Josie immediately began recovering.

The narcotics team worried that Josie would experience withdrawal and suggested that a smaller dose of narcotic should be administered. The surgeons on duty were consulted and it was agreed that a dose would be administered, despite Sorrel's concerns. The nurse explained to Sorrel that the order had been changed, and the nurse administered a shot of methadone. Sorrel's daughter's condition worsened until she was rushed to the Pediatric Intensive Care Unit where she suffered a cardiac arrest as well as extensive brain damage after her heart stopped. Despite revival efforts, Josie King passed away that evening of February 22, 2001.

An investigation from the hospital concluded that Josie King's cardiac arrest was caused by severe dehydration and that the warning signs—diarrhea, extreme thirst, weight loss, etc. -- had not been taken into account in Josie's case.

== Impact ==
=== Josie King Foundation ===
Johns Hopkins Hospital accepted full responsibility for the death of Josie King and offered the family a financial settlement. Dr. Peter J. Pronovost, a Johns Hopkins physician whose father had died due to medical errors, allied with Sorrel King and helped her establish her foundation as well as implement the Josie King Patient Safety program at Johns Hopkins. Sorrel King funded the program with $50,000 of her initial financial settlement, and then raised $200,000 more through her foundation. The program at Johns Hopkins hoped to revitalize the hospital's medical training with improved patient safety standards and a commitment to reducing and reporting medical errors.

The Josie King Foundation's main goal was to prevent harm to patients from medical errors. The foundation promoted speaking appearances, safety training programs, community outreach, among others. The foundation started the Josie King Hero Awards Program, which rewards any member of hospital staff that acknowledged, reported, or prevented a medical error. A video of Sorrel King's speaking appearance at an Institute of Healthcare Improvement (IHI) meeting was shared internationally to hundreds of hospitals and healthcare organizations. In the speech, King recounts the story of her daughter and suggested that parents should be able to call on the rapid response team if the patient's condition seems to worsen. Following this speech, and with support from the foundation, Condition H was implemented at UPMC-Shadyside Hospital. Condition H, where the H stands for help, is an established protocol that will enable patients, their families, or their visitors to initiate a rapid response call if there is perceived danger to the patient's health. This protocol was then implemented in hospitals throughout the nation.

=== Novel ===
Josie's Story: A Mother's Inspiring Crusade to Make Medical Care Safe is an autobiographical novel written by Sorrel King published by Grove Atlantic in 2009. Her novel was named one of the Best Health Books of 2009 by the Wall Street Journal, and nominated for a "Books for a Better life" Award from the Multiple Sclerosis Society.

=== Josie King Act ===
In 2004, Representative Patrick J. Kennedy introduced the Josie King Act (also referred to as the Quality, Efficiency, Standards and Technology for Health Care Transformation Act of 2004, or the QUEST Act), which was intended to improve sharing and distribution of secure medical information between healthcare providers and patients on a national level. The bill died without receiving a vote in the 108th Congress.

=== Media appearances ===
Sorrel King made appearances on Good Morning America and NBC Nightly News with Tom Brokaw as well as in an article entitled “Fixing Hospitals in 2005.” for Forbes magazine.
