= J. Michael Henderson =

- Born: 1945 (age 80–81); Edinburgh, Scotland
- Citizenship: United States
- Education: Scotland, M.B., Ch.B. Royal College, F.R.C.S.Ed. American College, F.A.C.S.
- Scientific career
- Fields: Portal hypertension Patient safety
- Workplaces: University of Mississippi Medical Center

J. Michael Henderson (born 1945 in Edinburgh, Scotland) is an American general and transplant surgeon, with experience in portal hypertension, liver transplantation, and pancreatic disease. Henderson is the Chief Medical Officer at the University of Mississippi Medical Center since 2015. Prior to this role, he was with the Cleveland Clinic from 1992–2014. He was the Chairman of the Department of General Surgery and Director of the Transplant Center for 12 years, and was the Chief Quality Officer for the Cleveland Clinic’s 10-hospital system for eight years.

== Biography ==
Henderson graduated in 1969 from the University of St. Andrews in Scotland with an M.B.Ch.B. (Bachelor of Medicine, Bachelor of Surgery). He received his surgical training in Edinburgh and Dundee, Scotland, and became a Fellow of the Royal College of Surgeons of Edinburgh (F.R.C.S.Ed.) in 1973. He became a Fellow of the American College of Surgeons (F.A.C.S.) in 1983. From 1978–92, he worked at Emory University, starting as a research Fellow, up to full Professor of Surgery and Director of Liver Transplant. From 1992–2014 he worked at the Cleveland Clinic in Cleveland, Ohio, as Chairman of General Surgery and Director of the Transplant Center initially, and from 2006–2014 as Chief Quality Officer of the Cleveland Clinic Health System and Professor of Surgery at the Cleveland Clinic Lerner College of Medicine. He was also the Chairman of its Quality and Patient Safety Institute, which integrated management systems for patient safety and quality for the Clinic.

== Career ==
Henderson’s medical career began in Edinburgh, Scotland where he trained in general surgery to become a fellow at the Royal College of Surgeons. He accepted a fellowship in 1978 at Emory University in Atlanta where he practiced for 14 years. He specialized in portal hypertension and helped start a liver transplant program in the 1980s.

In 1992, Henderson was appointed Chairman of Surgery at the Cleveland Clinic and Director of the Transplant Center. Henderson became the Chief Medical Officer at the University of Mississippi Medical Center on March 1, 2015.

Henderson has served on the World Health Organization Global Leaders Panel on the Leaders Guide on Patient Safety and Quality of Care in Service Delivery; The Joint Commission’s Center for Transforming Healthcare Advisory Board; and the WellPoint National Quality Advisory Panel. Through his work in quality improvement, he chaired the American College of Surgeons’ National Surgical Quality Improvement Program Advisory Committee; and the National Institutes of Health’s Data and Safety Monitoring Board for Living Liver Donor Studies. Henderson is Associate Editor of the Journal of Patient Safety.

Previously, he was Chair of the UNOS (United Network for Organ Sharing) Donation Committee; Chair of the Ohio Solid Organ Transplant Consortium; Chair of the Lifebanc (Northeast Ohio organ procurement organization) Board of Trustees; and a member of the Governing Body of the American Association for the Study of Liver Disease. He was a member of the Ohio Department of Health’s Hospital Quality Measures Advisory Council; and Chair of the NE Ohio Quality Collaborative with the Ohio Hospital Association.

Henderson is a member of the American College of Surgeons; the American Surgical Association; the James IV Association of Surgeons; and the American Hepato-Biliary-Pancreatic Association, of which he is the co-founder and the inaugural President. Along with Thomas Zeltner, the former Health Minister of Switzerland, Henderson is a founding member of the Global Patient Safety Forum, a global convening initiative of experts who collaborate on opportunities to improve care.

== Awards ==
- Teacher of the Year for Graduating Residents at Emory University
- Teacher of the Year for General Surgery Residents at the Cleveland Clinic
- Pete Conrad Global Patient Safety Award: 2012
