= James Woods on screen and stage =

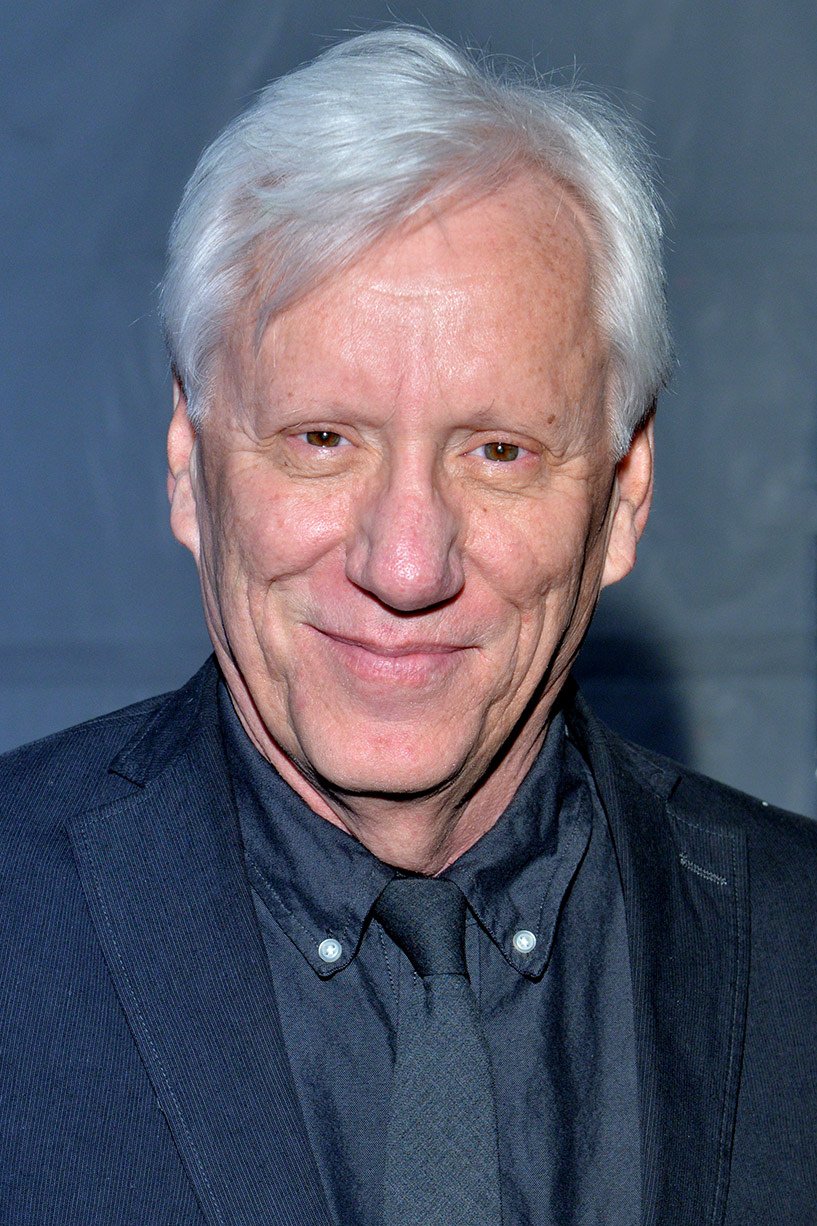
Woods in Beverly Hills, California on December 24, 2015.

This is the screen and stage filmography of the American actor and producer James Woods. He is known for his work in various film, television, and stage productions.

== Film ==
Year	Title	Role	Notes	Ref.
1972	The Visitors	Bill Schmidt		
1972	Hickey & Boggs	Lt. Wyatt		
1973	The Way We Were	Frankie McVeigh		
1974	The Gambler	Bank Officer		
1975	Night Moves	Quentin		
1976	Alex & the Gypsy	Crainpool		
1977	The Choirboys	Harold Bloomguard		
1979	The Onion Field	Gregory Powell		
1980	The Black Marble	The Fiddler		
1981	Eyewitness	Aldo Mercer		
1982	Fast-Walking	Fast-Walking		
1982	Split Image	Charles Pratt		
1983	Videodrome	Max Renn		
1984	Against All Odds	Jake Wise		
1984	Once Upon a Time in America	Maximilian Bercovicz		
1984	Terror in the Aisles	Max Renn	Archive footage; documentary	
1985	Cat's Eye	Dick Morrison		
1985	Joshua Then and Now	Joshua Shapiro		
1986	Salvador	Richard Boyle		
1987	Best Seller	Cleve		
1988	Cop	Lloyd Hopkins	Also producer	
1988	The Boost	Lenny Brown		
1989	True Believer	Eddie Dodd		
1989	Immediate Family	Michael Spector		
1991	The Hard Way	John Moss		
1992	Straight Talk	Jack Russell		
1992	Diggstown	Gabriel Caine		
1992	Chaplin	Joseph Scott		
1994	The Getaway	Jack Benyon		
1994	Curse of the Starving Class	Weston Tate		
1994	The Specialist	Ned Trent		
1995	For Better or Worse	Reggie Makeshift		
1995	Killer: A Journal of Murder	Carl Panzram		
1995	Casino	Lester Diamond		
1995	Nixon	H.R. Haldeman		
1996	Ghosts of Mississippi	Byron De La Beckwith		
1997	Kicked in the Head	Uncle Sam		
1997	Hercules	Hades	Voice	
1997	Contact	Michael Kitz		
1998	Vampires	Jack Crow		
1998	Another Day in Paradise	Mel	Also producer	
1999	True Crime	Alan Mann		
1999	The Virgin Suicides	Ronald Lisbon		
1999	The General's Daughter	Col. Robert Moore		
1999	Any Given Sunday	Dr. Harvey Mandrake		
1999	Play It to the Bone	Ringside Fan	Cameo	
2001	Recess: School's Out	Dr. Phillium Benedict	Voice	
2001	Final Fantasy: The Spirits Within	General Hein	Voice	
2001	Scary Movie 2	Father McFeely		
2001	Riding in Cars with Boys	Leonard Donofrio		
2001	Race to Space	Wilhelm von Huber		
2002	John Q.	Raymond Turner		
2002	Stuart Little 2	Falcon	Voice	
2002	Mickey's House of Villains	Hades	Voice; direct-to-video	
2002	Rolie Polie Olie: The Great Defender of Fun	Gloomius Maximus	Voice; direct-to-video	
2003	Northfork	Walter O'Brien	Also executive producer	
2003	This Girl's Life	Pops		
2005	Pretty Persuasion	Hank Joyce		
2005	Be Cool	Tommy Athens		
2005	Ark	Jallak	Voice	
2006	End Game	Vaughn Stevens	Direct-to-video	
2007	Surf's Up	Reggie Belafonte	Voice	
2008	An American Carol	Agent Todd Grosslight		
2010	Justice League: Crisis on Two Earths	Owlman	Voice; direct-to-video	
2011	Straw Dogs	Tom Heddon		
2011	Mia and the Migoo	Jojo-la-Frite	Voice; English dub	
2012	Officer Down	Captain Verona		
2013	White House Down	Martin Walker		
2013	Jobs	Dean Jack Dudman		
2014	Jamesy Boy	Lt. Falton		
2016	Bling	Victor	Voice	
2016	First Contact	Narrator	Voice; documentary	
2023	Oppenheimer	—N/a	Executive producer	
2023	Once Upon a Studio	Hades	Voice; short film	

== Television ==
Year	Title	Role	Notes
1973–1974	Kojak	Police Officer (uncredited) / Caz	2 episodes
1974	The Rockford Files	Larry Kirkoff	Episode: "The Kirkoff Case"
1975	Welcome Back, Kotter	Alex Welles	Episode: "The Great Debate"
1975	The Streets of San Francisco	Doug	Episode: "Trail of Terror"
1975	The Rookies	Ted Ayres	Episode: "A Time to Mourn"
1976	Barnaby Jones	Danny Reeves	Episode: "Sins of Thy Father"
1976	The Disappearance of Aimee	Asst. Disty. Atty. Joseph Ryan	Television film
1976	Police Story	Lewis Packer	Episode: "Thanksgiving"
1976	The Billion Dollar Bubble	Art Lewis	Television film
1976	Raid on Entebbe	Capt. Sammy Berg	Television film
1977	Family	Dr. Robert Styles	Episode: "An Eye to the Future"
1978	Holocaust	Karl Weiss	Miniseries; 4 episodes
1978	The Gift of Love	Alfred Browning	Television film
1979	The Incredible Journey of Doctor Meg Laurel	Sin Eater	Television film
1979–1980	Young Maverick	Lem Fraker	2 episodes
1985	Badge of the Assassin	Asst. Disty. Atty. Robert K. Tanenbaum	Television film
1986	Promise	D.J.	Television film
1987	In Love and War	James B. 'Jim' Stockdale	Television film
1989	My Name Is Bill W.	Bill Wilson	Television film
1989	Saturday Night Live	Host	Episode: "James Woods/Don Henley"
1990	Women & Men: Stories of Seduction	Robert	Television film
1991	The Boys	Walter Farmer	Television film
1992	Citizen Cohn	Roy Cohn	Television film
1993	Dream On	Dennis Youngblood	Episode: "Oral Sex, Lies and Videotape"
1993	Fallen Angels	Mickey Cohen	Episode: "Since I Don't Have You"
1994	Jane's House	Paul Clark	Television film
1994	The Simpsons	Himself	Voice; episode: "Homer and Apu"
1994	Next Door	Matt Coler	Television film
1995	Indictment: The McMartin Trial	Danny Davis	Television film
1996	The Summer of Ben Tyler	Temple Rayburn	Television film
1998–1999	Hercules	Hades	Voice; 31 episodes
2000	Dirty Pictures	Dennis Barrie	Television film
2001	Clerks: The Animated Series	Major Baklava	Voice; episode: "Leonardo Is Caught in the Grip of an Outbreak of Randal's Imagination and Patrick Swayze Either Does or Doesn't Work in the New Pet Store"
2001–2003	House of Mouse	Hades	Voice; 10 episodes
2002	Founding Brothers	John Adams	Voice; documentary
2002	Hooves of Fire	Narrator, Bus Driver	Voice; US dub
2002	Legend of the Lost Tribe	Prison Guard, Viking 1	Voice; US dub
2003	Rudy: The Rudy Giuliani Story	Rudy Giuliani	Television film
2005	Odd Job Jack	Manny Kowalski	Voice; episode: "Orgy: The Musical"
2005–2016	Family Guy	Himself	Voice; 8 episodes
2006	ER	Dr. Nate Lennox	Episode: "Body & Soul"
2006	Entourage	Himself	Episode: "Aquamom"
2006–2008	Shark	Sebastian Stark	38 episodes
2011	Too Big to Fail	Richard Fuld	Television film
2012	Coma	Dr. Theodore Stark	Miniseries; 2 episodes
2013	Mary and Martha	Tom	Television film
2013	Ray Donovan	Patrick Sullivan	6 episodes
2013	Futurescape	Himself	Host; 3 episodes
2016–2017	Justice League Action	Lex Luthor	Voice; 9 episodes
2017	Dice	James Woods	2 episodes

== Theatre ==
Year	Title	Role	Venue	Ref.
1969	The Penny Wars	Howie Clevenger	Royale Theatre, Broadway	
1970	Borstal Boy	Tom Meadows	Lyceum Theatre, Broadway	
1971	The Trial of the Catonsville Nine	David Darst	Lyceum Theatre, Broadway	
1972	Moonchildren	Bob Riffle	Royale Theatre, Broadway	
1973	Finishing Touches	Steve Cooper	Plymouth Theatre, Broadway	

== Video games ==
Year	Title	Role	Notes	Ref.
1997	Hercules	Hades		
1998	Of Light and Darkness: The Prophecy	Gar Hob		
2002	Kingdom Hearts	Hades		
2004	Grand Theft Auto: San Andreas	Mike Toreno		
2004	Kingdom Hearts: Chain of Memories	Hades		
2005	Kingdom Hearts II	Hades		
2006	Scarface: The World Is Yours	George Sheffield		
2010	Kingdom Hearts Birth by Sleep	Hades		
2014	Kingdom Hearts Re:coded Cinematics	Hades		
2019	Kingdom Hearts III	Hades		
2021	Grand Theft Auto: The Trilogy – The Definitive Edition	Mike Toreno	Archival recordings Remaster of Grand Theft Auto: San Andreas only	
2023	Disney Speedstorm	Hades		
2024	Disney Dreamlight Valley	Hades		
2027	Kingdom Hearts IV	Hades		

== See also ==
- List of awards and nominations received by James Woods
