= List of awards and nominations received by James Woods =

James Woods awards and nominations
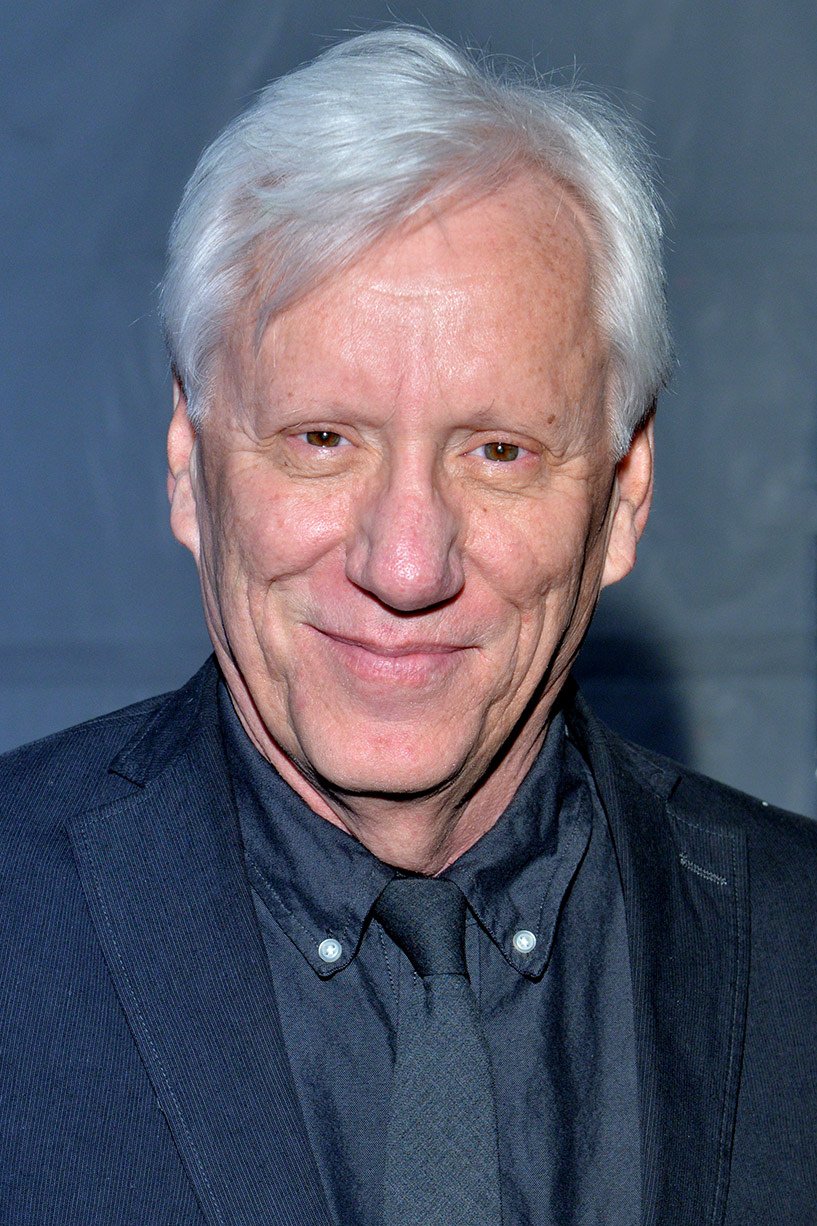
- Woods in 2015
Awards and nominations
Award	Wins	Nominations
Golden Globe	1	9
Academy Awards	0	2
Emmy Awards	3	9
Screen Actors Guild Awards	0	3

The following is a list of awards and nominations received by James Woods.

Woods is an American actor known for his performances on stage and screen. Over his career he has received three Emmy Awards and a Golden Globe Award as well as nominations for two Academy Awards and three Screen Actors Guild Awards.

He has received two Academy Award nominations for Best Actor for his performance as photojournalist Richard Boyle in Oliver Stone's war drama Salvador (1986) and for Best Supporting Actor for his performance as the white supremacist Byron De La Beckwith in the Rob Reiner courtroom drama Ghosts of Mississippi (1996). He has also received three Screen Actors Guild Award and three Independent Spirit Award nominations winning for Independent Spirit Award for Best Male Lead for Salvador. He was SAG-nominated for Nixon (1995), and Dirty Pictures (2000).

For his work on television he received eight Primetime Emmy Award nominations winning twice for Outstanding Lead Actor in a Limited Series or Movie for his performances in Promise (1987) and My Name Is Bill W. (1989). For his combined work in film and television he has earned nine Golden Globe Award nominations winning for Golden Globe Award for Best Actor – Miniseries or Television Film for Promise.

On October 15, 1998, Woods was inducted into the Hollywood Walk of Fame with a star at 7021 Hollywood Blvd.

== Major awards ==
=== Academy Awards ===
Year	Category	Nominated work	Result	Ref.
1987	Best Actor	Salvador	Nominated	
1997	Best Supporting Actor	Ghosts of Mississippi	Nominated	

=== Golden Globe Awards ===
Year	Category	Nominated work	Result	Ref.
1980	Best Actor – Motion Picture Drama	The Onion Field	Nominated	
1987	Best Actor – Miniseries or Television Film	Promise	Won	
1988	Best Actor – Miniseries or Television Film	In Love and War	Nominated	
1990	Best Actor – Miniseries or Television Film	My Name Is Bill W.	Nominated	
1993	Best Actor – Miniseries or Television Film	Citizen Cohn	Nominated	
1996	Best Actor – Miniseries or Television Film	Indictment: The McMartin Trial	Nominated	
1997	Best Supporting Actor – Motion Picture	Ghosts of Mississippi	Nominated	
1997	Best Actor – Miniseries or Television Film	The Summer of Ben Tyler	Nominated	
2001	Best Actor – Miniseries or Television Film	Dirty Pictures	Nominated	

=== Emmy Awards ===
Year	Category	Nominated work	Result	Ref.
Primetime Emmy Awards
1987	Outstanding Lead Actor in a Miniseries or a Special	Promise	Won	
1989	Outstanding Lead Actor in a Miniseries or a Special	My Name Is Bill W.	Won	
1989	Outstanding Performance in Informational Programming	Crimes of Passion	Nominated	
1993	Outstanding Lead Actor in a Miniseries or a Special	Citizen Cohn	Nominated	
1995	Outstanding Lead Actor in a Miniseries or a Special	Indictment: The McMartin Trial	Nominated	
2003	Outstanding Lead Actor in a Miniseries or a Movie	Rudy: The Rudy Giuliani Story	Nominated	
2006	Outstanding Guest Actor in a Drama Series	ER (for "Body & Soul")	Nominated	
2011	Outstanding Supporting Actor in a Miniseries or Movie	Too Big to Fail	Nominated	
Daytime Emmy Awards
2000	Outstanding Performer in an Animated Program	Hercules	Won	

=== Independent Spirit Awards ===
Year	Category	Nominated work	Result	Ref.
1987	Best Male Lead	Salvador	Won	
1988	Best Male Lead	Best Seller	Nominated	
1989	Best Male Lead	The Boost	Nominated	

=== Screen Actors Guild Awards ===
Year	Category	Nominated work	Result	Ref.
1996	Outstanding Cast in a Motion Picture	Nixon	Nominated	
2001	Outstanding Actor in a Miniseries or Television Movie	Dirty Pictures	Nominated	
2012	Outstanding Actor in a Miniseries or Television Movie	Too Big to Fail	Nominated	

== Theatre awards ==
Organizations	Year	Category	Work	Result	Ref.
Clarence Derwent Award	1971	Most Promising Performer	Saved	Won	
Theater World Awards	1972	Theater World Award	Moonchildren	Won	

== Miscellaneous Awards ==
Organizations	Year	Category	Work	Result	Ref.
CableACE Awards	1993	Best Actor in a Movie or Miniseries	Citizen Cohn	Nominated	
CableACE Awards	1994	Best Actor in a Dramatic Series	Fallen Angels	Nominated	
CableACE Awards	1995	Best Actor in a Movie or Miniseries	Indictment: The McMartin Trial	Nominated	
Satellite Awards	1997	Best Actor – Motion Picture Drama	Killer: A Journal of Murder	Won	
Satellite Awards	2001	Best Actor – Miniseries or Television Film	Dirty Pictures	Won	
Satellite Awards	2004	Best Actor – Miniseries or Television Film	Rudy: The Rudy Giuliani Story	Won	
Satellite Awards	2007	Best Actor – Television Series Drama	Shark	Nominated	
Satellite Awards	2011	Best Supporting Actor – Television	Too Big to Fail	Nominated	
Saturn Award	1999	Best Actor	Vampires	Won	

== Critics awards ==
Organizations	Year	Category	Work	Result	Ref.
Broadcast Film Critics Association	1997	Best Supporting Actor	Ghosts of Mississippi	Nominated	
Chicago Film Critics Association	1997	Best Supporting Actor	Ghosts of Mississippi	Nominated	
Kansas City Film Critics Circle	1979	Best Supporting Actor	The Onion Field	Won	
Las Vegas Film Critics Society	2000	Best Supporting Actor	The Virgin Suicides	Nominated	
National Society of Film Critics	1980	Best Supporting Actor	The Onion Field	Nominated	
New York Film Critics Circle	1979	Best Supporting Actor	The Onion Field	Nominated	
