= Mercantile Library of Cincinnati =

Coordinates: 39°6′3.6″N 84°30′40″W

The Mercantile Library of Cincinnati is a membership library located in downtown Cincinnati, Ohio. The name of the library refers not to the type of items in its collection but to the forty-five merchants and clerks who founded it on April 18, 1835, as the Young Men's Mercantile Library Association.

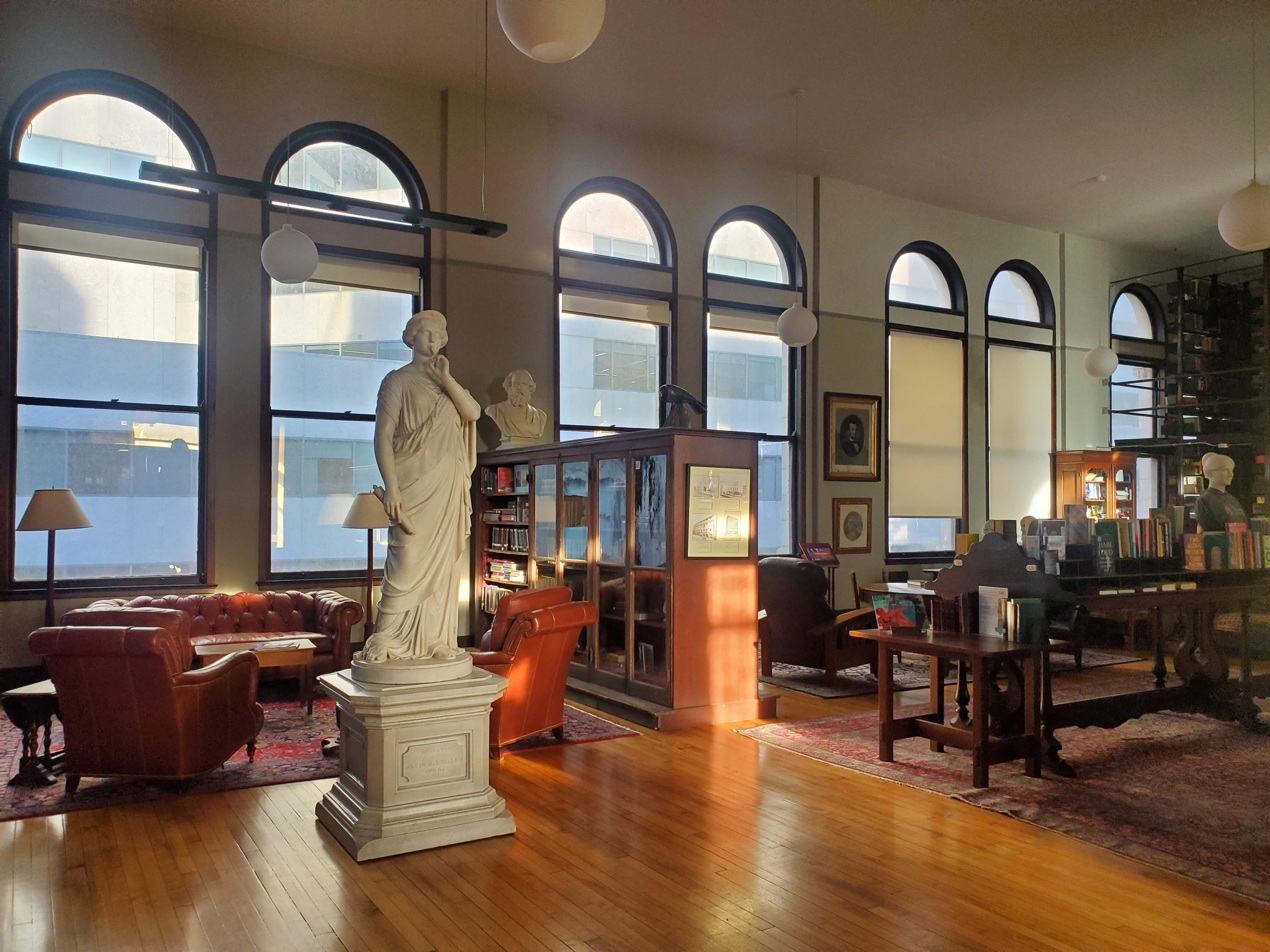
Silencia greets visitors in The Mercantile Library

== Collection ==
Once established in 1835, the Young Men's Mercantile Library Association pooled their existing resources (books, materials, money, etc.) and began organizing their membership library. The Mercantile Library of Cincinnati collected books and other relevant works of art and hosted events which involved prominent speakers and authors, quickly coming to be regarded as “a cultural, intellectual, and literary center of its region”.

Throughout the library's history, many of its books have been donated by members. It originally contained approximately seven hundred books which were housed at a location on Main Street near Pearl Street. In 1840 the collection of 1660 books was moved to the second floor of the Cincinnati College building on the present site. The collection now numbers more than 200,000 volumes, including an especially large number pertaining to Cincinnati and Ohio. Most of the items circulate. While there was originally a ban on novels, the ban has since been lifted. Currently the collection is more general.

After opening its doors nearly 185 years ago, The Mercantile Library has several thousand volumes in their catalog that aim to display and reflect upon decades of changing interests, beliefs, and influences. Despite still operating as a membership library, The Mercantile Library of Cincinnati is open year round to members of the public who wish to explore the institution.

== Location ==
The Mercantile Library Building at 414 Walnut Street that currently houses the library is the fourth structure on the site. The space on the eleventh and twelfth floors was designed for the library in 1903 and the building was completed in 1908. Many of the shelves, desks and chairs currently in the library date back to previous buildings which were destroyed by fire. The institution's perpetually renewable 10,000-year lease was issued by the Cincinnati College, which merged with the University of Cincinnati College of Law in 1911, in exchange for the men of the Mercantile Library Association helping the college to rebuild after its structure burned in 1845. The building was listed on the National Register of Historic Places in 2021. From 2023 to 2024, the Model Group converted much of the building along with the adjacent Formica Building into residential apartments named "Merc & Mica".

== Cultural programs ==
The library's tradition of cultural programs was initiated by its founders and has featured prominent writers and thinkers since its first lecture series in the 1840s. Speakers in the early days included Ralph Waldo Emerson, Wendell Phillips, W. M. Thackeray, Edward Everett, Herman Melville, Henry Ward Beecher and Harriet Beecher Stowe; more recent programs have brought writers and speakers like John Updike, Tom Wolfe, and Jonathan Winters. Many events, including courses, concerts, author readings and book signings, are scheduled at noon for the convenience of members and visitors who work and shop downtown.
