= Metrobot =

- Artist: Nam June Paik
- Year: October 27, 1988
- Type: Aluminum
- Dimensions: 8.2 m × 1.8 m (27 ft × 6 ft)
- Location: Contemporary Arts Center, Cincinnati, Ohio, United States; 39°6′10″N 84°30′43″W
- Owner: Contemporary Arts Center

Metrobot is an electronic public art sculpture designed by Nam June Paik. At the time of its unveiling in 1988, it was Paik's first outdoor sculpture and his largest. Since 2014, it has stood in front of the Contemporary Arts Center (CAC) on Walnut Street in downtown Cincinnati, Ohio, United States.

== Description ==
The 27-foot-tall (8.2 m), gold-painted aluminum sculpture resembles a boxy humanoid robot. Its whimsical facial expression and heart are made of neon tubing behind clear plastic covers. On its outstretched left arm, an LED display features rotating messages, including the time and temperature. On its stomach, another large display features videos in full color. Three smaller LED monitors are located in its right calf. In Metrobot's original configuration, the video screens displayed videos that Paik created specially for the sculpture. A payphone is built into the left calf.

Metrobot's functional components, including the clock and payphone, are a commentary on people's preference for experiencing the world through technology and electronic media rather than physically. Paik has authorized Metrobot's owner, the CAC, to upgrade and replace Metrobot's technology without the risk of invalidating its certificate of authenticity.

== History ==
In 1970, the CAC moved into the second floor of the Formica Building (Mercantile Center) on Fifth Street. Despite the highly visible location across from the Government Square bus station, the CAC was embarrassed about being located above a Walgreens pharmacy and sought to dramatize the building entrance. In 1988, Albert Vontz Jr., a CAC board member and owner of the Cincinnati-based beer and wine wholesaler Heidelberg Distributing, agreed to commission the entrance piece for $175,000 and donate it to the CAC to commemorate its 50th anniversary and the city's bicentennial. At the suggestion of gallerist Carl Solway, CAC director Jack Boulton selected Paik, who was known for fashioning robot sculptures out of television sets. Designer Thomas Strohmaier of Broadway Sign Company partnered with Paik to fabricate the sculpture.

Metrobot was unveiled on October 27, 1988, at a ceremony with balloons, robot cookies, and the Lockland High School marching band. Mayor Charlie Luken gave Paik a key to the city and declared the day "Robot Day". In 1990, Vontz received a Greater Cincinnati Beautiful award for bringing Metrobot to downtown Cincinnati.

In 1996, the Save Outdoor Sculpture! project noted some signs of deterioration. Metrobot had become a target for graffiti, the caulking between its feet and the concrete platform needed repair, and two of its video monitors had stopped working. By 2001, the neon face and heart had also gone dark. In 2003, the CAC moved to a new, Zaha Hadid–designed building on Walnut Street. When the CAC's lease on the sidewalk expired in June 2009, Metrobot was disassembled and placed in storage. A Facebook page advocated for the sculpture's return.

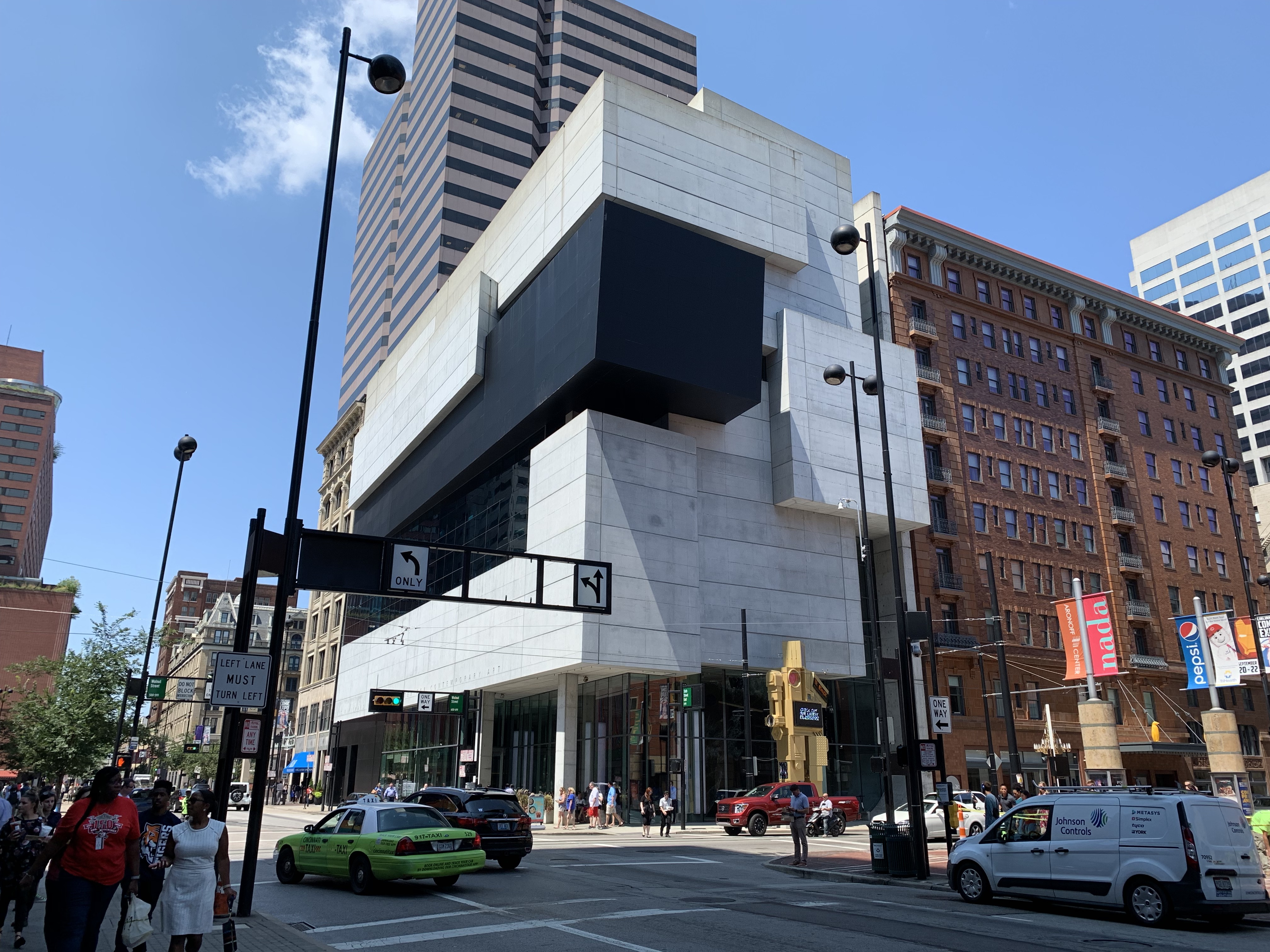
In 2003, the CAC relocated to the Rosenthal Center for Contemporary Art, where Metrobot was eventually reinstalled.

In 2013, the CAC decided to reinstall Metrobot outside its Walnut Street location to celebrate the center's 75th anniversary. Beforehand, it underwent a restoration that replaced the left arm's flip-disc display with an LED display, the stomach's backlit screen with a full-color video message board, and the three cathode-ray tubes in the right calf with LED monitors for improved energy efficiency. The LaserDisc input mechanism was replaced by remote control from within the CAC building. The neon lights and payphone were replaced. Strohmaier, now with Klusty Sign Associates, oversaw the restoration by Tri-State Fabricators. The $140,000 project was funded by Albert Vontz III and the Ralph V. Haile/U.S. Bank Foundation. The restored sculpture was installed on August 29, 2014, and switched on for the first time on September 10, with a dance party and performance by MK Guth. The city declared the day "Metrobot Day" in honor of the debut.

Around 2017, a three-dimensional stikman was found affixed to Metrobot.

== Operation ==
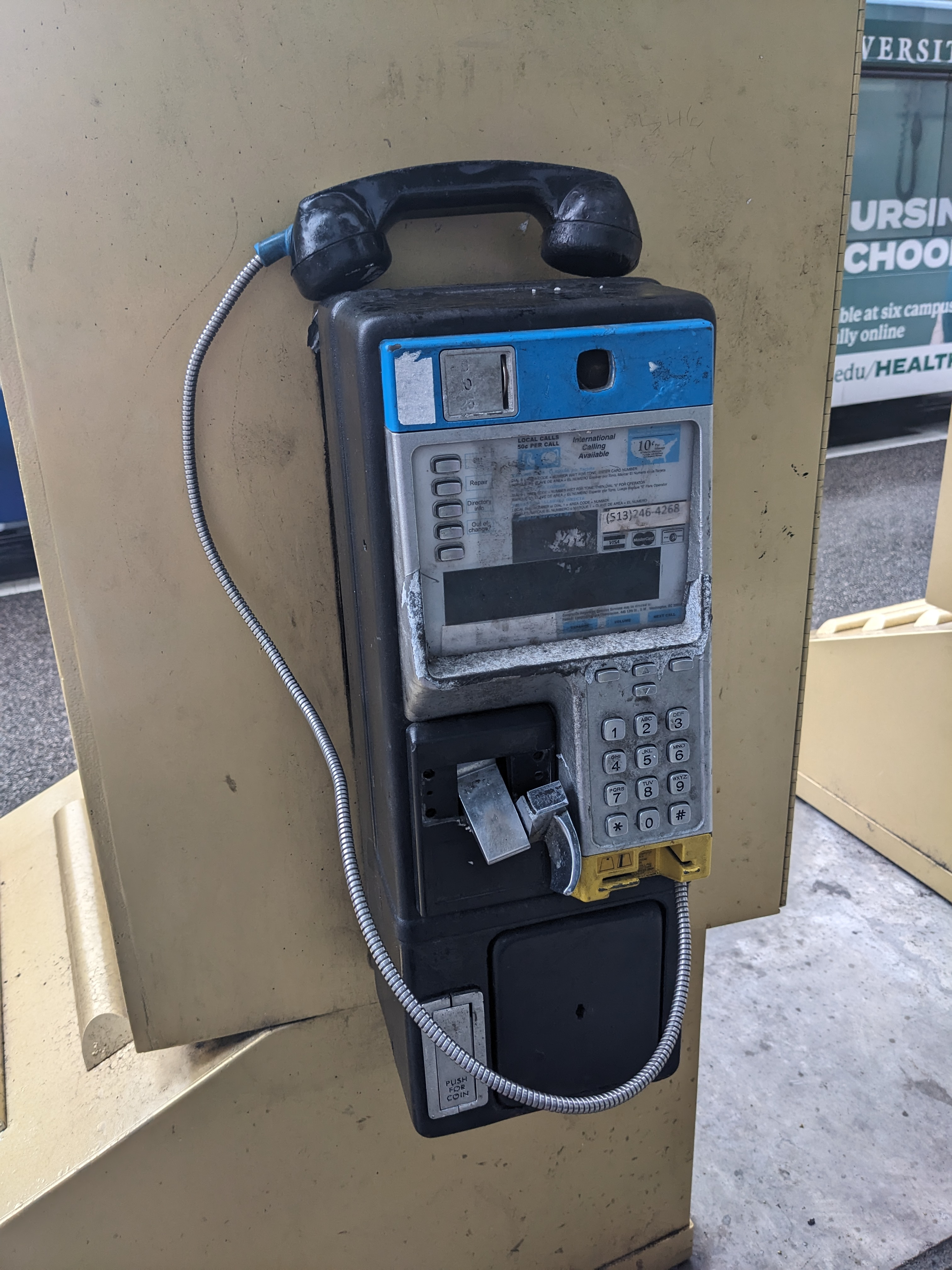
The Metrobot payphone in a state of disrepair.

Prior to the 2014 upgrade, the electronic message board on Metrobot's left arm could be programmed to scroll through 99 arbitrary messages up to 400 times per day. In 1990, the CAC began renting out the message board to the public, charging $10 for a non-commercial message up to 15 words in length.

At one point, the payphone in the left calf was the most heavily used payphone in the city and a revenue generator for the CAC. It resumed placing calls upon the sculpture's reinstallation in 2014, charging 10 cents per call. However, it was out of service by 2018.

== Engineering ==
The structure can withstand ambient temperatures ranging from −20 to 120 °F (−29 to 49 °C) and winds of more than 100 miles per hour (160 km/h). A door on the left side of the torso provides service access to the electronic components.
