= Dennis Barrie =

American museum director (born 1947)

Dennis Barrie (born 1947) is an American museum director responsible for the curation of American pop culture. He was the Director of the Cincinnati Contemporary Arts Center from 1983–1992. In 1990 Barrie and the gallery were indicted on obscenity charges stemming from exhibiting sadomasochistic photographs by Robert Mapplethorpe as part of an exhibit entitled The Perfect Moment. This was the first criminal trial of an art museum over the contents of an exhibition. At trial, a Cincinnati jury acquitted Barrie and the Center. The controversy was later chronicled in a TV movie titled Dirty Pictures.

Barrie went on to become a co-creator of Cleveland's Rock and Roll Hall of Fame, where he served as an executive director from 1993–1998.

From 1998 to 2005 Barrie served as president of the Malrite Company where he oversaw the opening of the International Spy Museum, in Washington DC.
