= Contemporary Arts Center =

Art museum in Ohio, US

Coordinates: 39.102909°N 84.512243°W

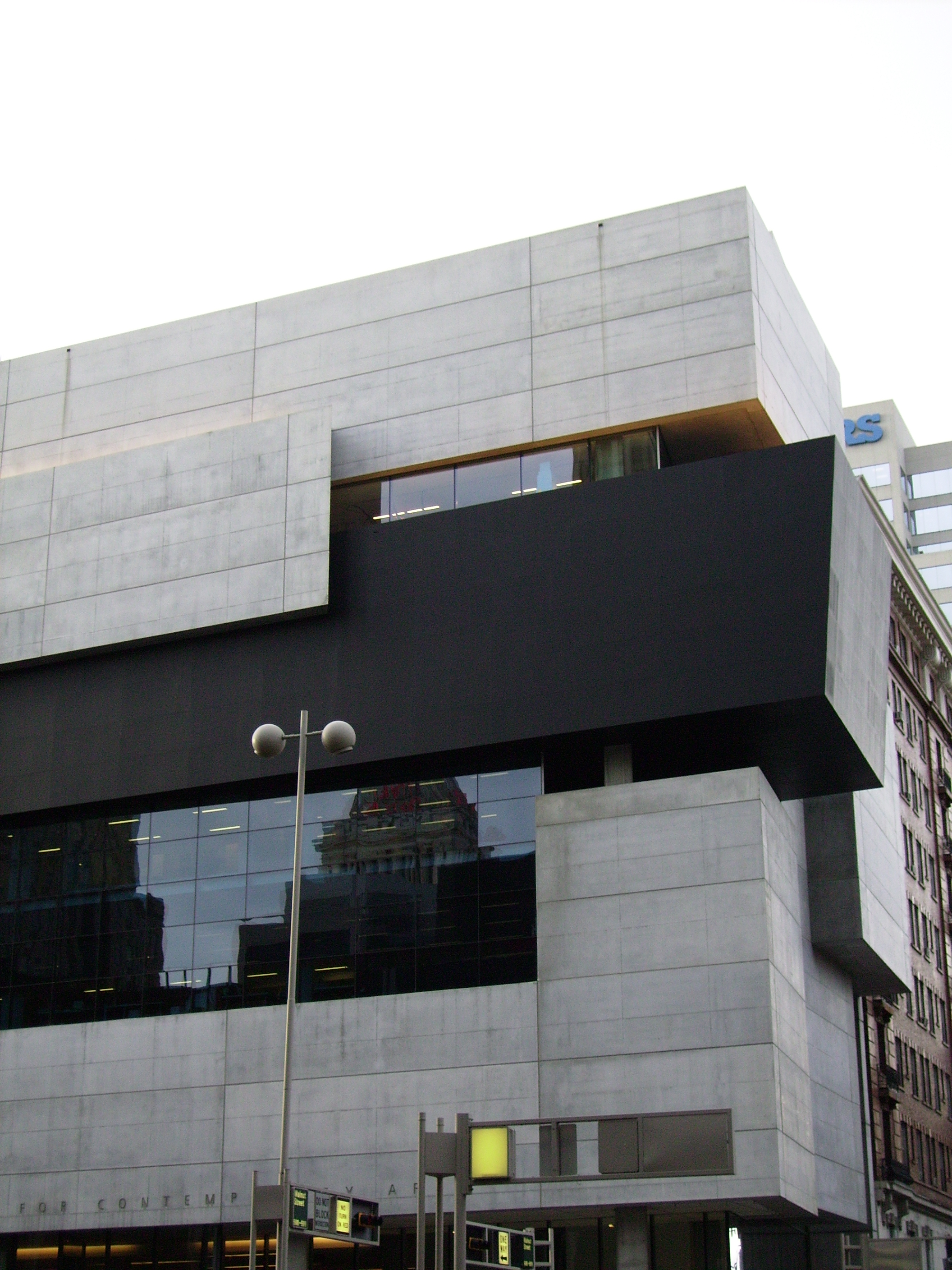
- Established: 1939
- Location: 44 E. 6th Street Cincinnati, Ohio, United States
- Director: Raphaela Platow
- Website: www.contemporaryartscenter.org

The Contemporary Arts Center (abbreviated CAC) is a contemporary art museum in Cincinnati, Ohio and one of the first contemporary art institutions in the United States. The CAC is a non-collecting museum that focuses on new developments in painting, sculpture, photography, architecture, performance art and new media. Focusing on programming that reflects "the art of the last five minutes", the CAC has displayed the works of many now-famous artists early in their careers, including Andy Warhol. In 2003, the CAC moved to a new building designed by Zaha Hadid.

== History ==
The Contemporary Arts Center was founded as the Modern Art Society in 1939 by Betty Pollak Rauh, Peggy Frank Crawford and Rita Rentschler Cushman. These three women were able to raise enough money through donations to display modern art at the Cincinnati Art Museum. Early advice and encouragement was offered by both Edward M.M. Warburg, a friend of the Pollak family, as well as Alfred H. Barr. The society's very first exhibit, Modern Painting from Cincinnati Collections, opened in December of the same year. In 1954 the Modern Art Society adopted its current name, the Contemporary Arts Center. The name change coincided with the creation of two permanent galleries that were remodeled from part of the museum's lower level. These two spaces, designed by Carl Strauss and Ray Roush, consisted of about 900 square feet (84 m^{2}) each and featured movable wooden wall covers. Many local Cincinnati collections were shown in this space, including works now kept at the Cincinnati Art Museum from the Mary E. Johnston collection.

Construction on the Emery Wing at the Cincinnati Art Museum replaced the original space of the CAC. As a result of the museum’s need to expand, the center moved out in 1962 and temporarily inhabited various locations at the Taft Museum of Art, space at 608 Main Street, and the Carew Tower. In 1964 the center occupied the fourth floor of the Women’s Exchange building at 113 West Fourth street where it remained for six years. After two years on Fourth street the center announced that it had plans to move to the Mercantile Center on Fifth street, which opened in 1970. The new building cost $400,000 and was designed by Harry Weese. The CAC’s space covered about 12,000 square feet (1,100 m^{2}) and overlooked the new bus terminal in downtown Cincinnati. Despite early financial troubles in 1971, the CAC was able to put on over 400 exhibitions during its 30-year stay on Government Square. A permanent lease for the location was acquired in 1982 through a city bond.

Early proposals for a home began at the end of the 1960s and included possible locations at the Civic Masonic Memorial Building in downtown Cincinnati. Later, as the idea of constructing an entirely new building became possible, the CAC focused on the site at Sixth and Walnut. By 1997 the center’s Architectural Selection Committee was publicly seeking architects to design the CAC's first-free standing building. The search narrowed 97 statements of qualification to twelve semi finalists: Coop Himmelblau, Diller & Scofidio, Herzog & de Meuron, Steven Holl, Rem Koolhaas, Eric Owen Moss, Jean Nouvel, Toyo Ito, Antoine Predock, Zaha Hadid, Daniel Liebeskind and Bernard Tschumi. One year later the board granted the commission to Zaha Hadid. Construction began in 2001 and the new building opened on May 31, 2003.

== Projects and exhibitions ==
In 1988, the CAC put Metrobot by Nam June Paik on permanent exhibition in front of its Mercantile Center location on Fifth Street. It remained there after the CAC moved to Walnut Street, until it went into storage in 2009. In 2014, it was reinstalled in front of the Walnut Street location.

In March 2008, the Contemporary Arts Center announced the exhibition and auction "FORM: Contemporary Architects at Play".

Participating architects included:

- Peter Eisenman, Eisenman Architects
- Michael Graves, Graves Design
- Zaha Hadid, Zaha Hadid Architects
- Thom Mayne, Morphosis
- Bill Pedersen, Kohn Pedersen Fox
- Laurinda Spear, Arquitectonica
- Bernard Tschumi, Bernard Tschumi Architects
- Jaime Velez, Skidmore, Owings and Merrill, LLP
- Massimo Vignelli, Vignelli Designs, Inc.
- Buzz Yudell, Moore Ruble Yudell Architects and Planners

Christie's Fine Arts Division sold eight pieces and one concept at auction raising $425,000.

In March 2011 the Laminex Group brought the collection to New Zealand for the Auckland Arts Festival and invited New Zealand architects and design professionals to submit entries for a New Zealand collection. The domestic competition was entitled "Formica Formations". Queenstown designer Graham Roebeck of Structural Integrity Ltd won the Professional category and Auckland Unitec student Norman Lin, the emerging designer category.

== Controversies ==
In 1990, a Cincinnati jury acquitted the Contemporary Arts Center and its director, Dennis Barrie, of obscenity charges stemming from an exhibition of photographs by Robert Mapplethorpe. In the first criminal trial of an art museum over the contents of an exhibition, the case centered on seven out of 175 photographs in an exhibition (The Perfect Moment) that traveled from Berkeley to Boston; five of the seven photographs depicted men in sadomasochistic poses and were the basis of charges that the museum and its director had pandered obscenity. Much of the dispute over the Mapplethorpe photographs centered on whether federal money should be used to finance them, through the National Endowment for the Arts. If convicted, the center would have faced fines of up to $10,000; Barrie could have faced a year in jail and fines up to $2,000. The trial was chronicled in the 2000 television movie Dirty Pictures.

== Location ==
44 East 6th Street (Corner of 6th & Walnut), Cincinnati, OH 45202 Across Walnut Street from the Aronoff Center for the Arts in downtown Cincinnati's cultural and entertainment area known as the Backstage District.

== Architecture ==
In 2003, the CAC moved to its first free-standing home which was designed by Zaha Hadid. The CAC chose to honor two of its major donors by naming the building the Lois and Richard Rosenthal Center for Contemporary Art. The Rosenthal Center for Contemporary Art was Zaha Hadid's first American project. Hailed by The New York Times' architecture critic Herbert Muschamp as "the most important American building to be completed since the cold war," the project was the brainchild of Director Charles Desmarais. (Desmarais left the CAC for the Brooklyn Museum in early 2005.)

The building's footprint is 11,000 square feet (1,000 m^{2}), with a total area of 80,000 square feet (7,400 m^{2}) on seven floors. The project cost $34 million, with design features including "Urban Carpet", "Jigsaw Puzzle", and "Skin/Sculpture".

=== Awards ===
- 2004 Royal Institute of British Architects (RIBA) Award
- 2005 American Architecture Award from The Chicago Athenaeum

== See also ==
- Contemporary art
