= James Woods =

American actor (born 1947)

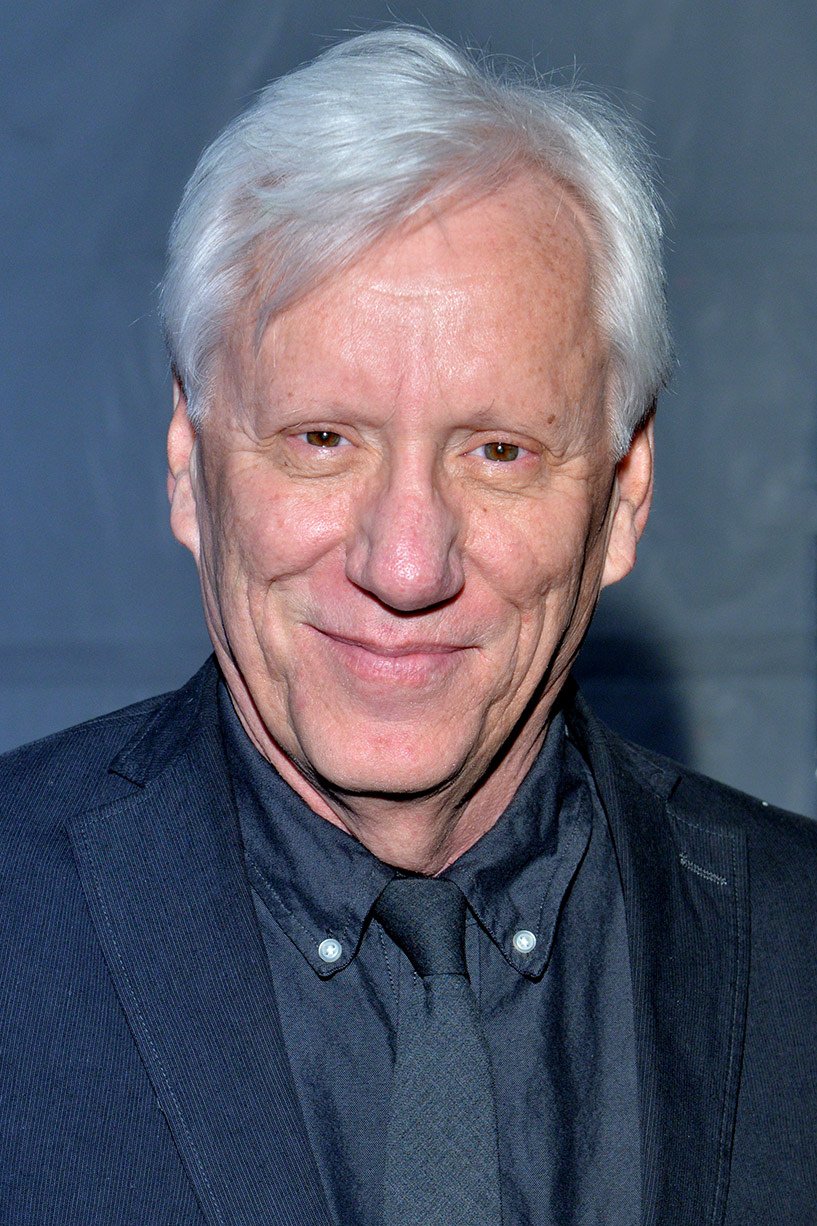
- Woods in 2015
- Born: James Howard Woods; April 18, 1947 (age 79); Vernal, Utah, U.S.
- Occupation: Actor
- Years active: 1969–present
- Works: Full list
- Spouses: Kathryn Morrison (m. 1980; div. 1983) Sarah Owen (m. 1989; div. 1990) Sara Miller-Woods (m. 2021)
- Awards: Full list

James Howard Woods (born April 18, 1947) is an American actor. Known for fast-talking, intense roles on screen and stage, he has received numerous accolades, including three Emmy Awards and a Golden Globe Award, as well as nominations for two Academy Awards and three Actor Awards. Woods made his Broadway debut in the Elliott Baker play The Penny Wars (1969). His early films roles include The Visitors (1972), The Way We Were (1973) and The Gambler (1974), before starring with Meryl Streep in the NBC miniseries Holocaust (1978).

He rose to prominence portraying Gregory Powell in The Onion Field (1979). He earned two Academy Awards nominations: one for Best Actor for his role as Richard Boyle in Salvador (1986) and for Best Supporting Actor for playing Byron De La Beckwith in Ghosts of Mississippi (1996). His notable films include Videodrome (1983), Once Upon a Time in America (1984), Straight Talk, Chaplin (both 1992), Casino, Nixon (both 1995), Contact (1997), Another Day in Paradise (1998), Any Given Sunday, The Virgin Suicides (both 1999), and White House Down (2013). He served as an executive producer on Christopher Nolan's epic biographical thriller film Oppenheimer (2023).

On television, he won two Primetime Emmy Awards for portraying a man with schizophrenia in the CBS movie Promise (1986) and Bill W. in the ABC film My Name Is Bill W. (1989). He also played Roy Cohn in Citizen Cohn (1992) and Dick Fuld in Too Big to Fail (2011). He starred in the legal drama series Shark (2006–2008), and acted in the crime series Ray Donovan (2013). He has voiced roles for Hercules (1997), Recess: School's Out (2001), Stuart Little 2 (2002), Grand Theft Auto: San Andreas (2004), and Surf's Up (2007), as well as voicing himself in The Simpsons (1994), and Family Guy (2005–2016).

== Early life and education ==
James Howard Woods was born on April 18, 1947 in Vernal, Utah, the elder of two brothers. His father, Gail Peyton Woods, was a United States Army intelligence officer who died in 1960 after routine surgery. His mother, Martha A. (née Smith), ran a pre-school after her husband's death. She later remarried, to Thomas E. Dixon. Woods grew up in Warwick, Rhode Island, where he attended Pilgrim High School, from which he graduated in 1965. He is of part Irish descent and was raised Catholic, briefly serving as an altar boy.

Woods was an undergraduate at Massachusetts Institute of Technology (MIT). He stated on Inside the Actors Studio that he originally intended to become an eye surgeon. He pledged the Theta Delta Chi fraternity and was a member of the student theatre group Dramashop, acting in and directing a number of plays. He dropped out of MIT in 1969, one semester before graduating, to pursue an acting career.

Woods has said that he owes his acting career to Tim Affleck, father of actors Ben and Casey Affleck. The senior Affleck was a stage manager at the Theatre Company of Boston, which Woods attended as a student.

== Career ==
=== 1969–1976: Broadway debut and early work ===
Woods appeared in 36 plays before making his Broadway debut in the 1969 play The Penny Wars. The following year, he acted in the first American production of Frank McMahon's adaptation of Brendan Behan's Borstal Boy (1970) at the Lyceum Theatre. He got the part by pretending he was British. He returned to Broadway the following year to portray David Darst in Daniel Berrigan's The Trial of the Catonsville Nine also at the Lyceum Theatre. In 1971, he played Bob Rettie in the American premiere of Michael Weller's Moonchildren at the Arena Stage in Washington, D.C. The following year the production moved to Broadway at the Royale Theatre where Woods starred alongside Edward Herrmann and Christopher Guest. In 1972, Woods won a Theatre World Award for his performance. He returned to Broadway in 1973 to portray Steven Cooper in the original production of Jean Kerr's Finishing Touches at the Plymouth Theatre.

Woods has garnered a reputation as a prominent Hollywood character actor, having appeared in over 130 films and television series. By the early 1970s, he was getting small movie roles including his feature film debut in Elia Kazan's The Visitors which debuted at the 1972 Cannes Film Festival. That same year, he acted in the neo-noir crime film Hickey & Boggs (1972) starring Robert Culp and Bill Cosby. The following year he had a supporting turn as Barbra Streisand's college boyfriend before she meets Robert Redford in the Sydney Pollack directed romance drama The Way We Were (1973). He continued to act in films such as the crime drama The Gambler (1974) starring James Caan, the neo-noir Night Moves (1975) with Gene Hackman and the comedy Alex & the Gypsy (1976) with Jack Lemmon. He acted in the Robert Aldrich directed comedy-drama The Choirboys (1977) alongside Charles Durning, Louis Gossett Jr., Randy Quaid and Burt Young.

=== 1978–1989: Breakthrough and acclaim ===
Woods rose to prominence playing the husband of Meryl Streep in the critically acclaimed four episode miniseries Holocaust (1978) which aired on NBC. The series focuses on the story of a Jewish family's struggle to survive Nazi Germany's campaign of genocide against the Jewish people. The series also starred Michael Moriarty and Rosemary Harris. Holocaust won the Outstanding Limited Series as well as seven other Primetime Emmy Awards. The following year Woods took a leading role starring in The Onion Field (1979) playing murderer Gregory Powell. Critic Gene Siskel of The Chicago Tribune praised Woods' performance writing, "At the center of The Onion Field is a bunch of superior performances. James Woods (the persecuted artist in "The Holocaust") is a standout as Greg Powell, the ringleader of the crooks, a horrible creature with a scarred face and a quicksilver personality that ranges from murderous to fatherly to murderous in a matter of seconds." He also opined that "Woods deserves an Academy Award nomination for this role." Woods received nominations for Best Actor from the Golden Globe Awards, the National Society of Film Critics, and the New York Film Critics Circle Association, but notably not from the Academy Awards.

At the start of the 1980s, Woods played an eccentric and unpredictable janitor in the Peter Yates directed thriller Eyewitness (1981) co-starring Sigourney Weaver, William Hurt, Morgan Freeman and Christopher Plummer. He acted in the prison drama Fast-Walking (1982) with Variety giving the film a mixed review but praising him as "always interesting to watch". That same year, he acted in the psychological drama Split Image (1982).

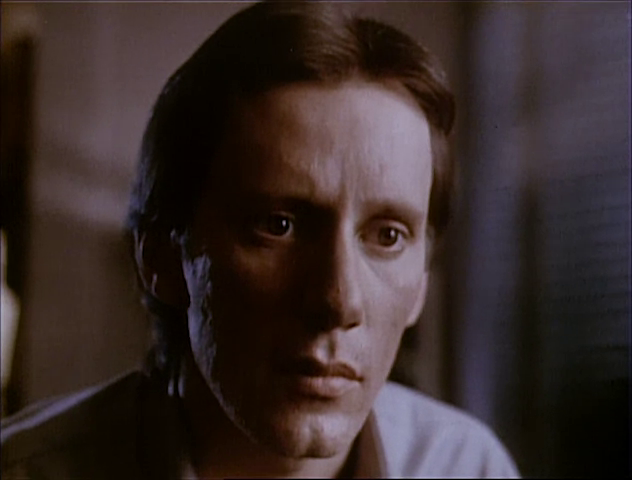
Woods in Videodrome (1983)

Woods took the starring role in the David Cronenberg written and directed science-fiction body horror film Videodrome (1983). Critic Janet Maslin of The New York Times praised the film and the leading performance writing, "By far Mr. Cronenberg's most inspired touch is the casting of Mr. Woods, who brings an almost backhanded heroism to the horror genre. In villainous or sinister roles...Mr. Woods has been startling, but that kind of casting is almost a redundancy. Here, his offhand wisecracking gives the performance a sharply authentic edge. And his jittery, insinuating manner even begins to look like a kind of innocence, in comparison with the calm, soothing attitudes of the video-crazed megalomaniacs he's up against."

He then took on the role of Maximillian "Max" Bercovicz, a Jewish gangster, in Sergio Leone's epic Once Upon a Time in America (1984) alongside Robert De Niro, Tuesday Weld, and Joe Pesci. Woods considers his role in the film as one of his favorites. The film premiered at the 1984 Cannes Film Festival and received a 15-minute standing ovation. Rotten Tomatoes reports an 86% approval rating with 51 reviews, the consensus reading, "Sergio Leone's epic crime drama is visually stunning, stylistically bold, and emotionally haunting, and filled with great performances from the likes of Robert De Niro and James Woods." That same year, he also starred in Against All Odds as a nightclub owner who hires an aging football star, played by Jeff Bridges, to find his missing girlfriend.

In Oliver Stone's drama Salvador (1986), Woods portrayed real-life journalist Richard Boyle as he chronicles events in El Salvador. Despite his criticism that ""Salvador" is long and disjointed and tries to tell too many stories," Roger Ebert wrote in the Chicago Sun-Times, "This is the sort of role Woods was born to play". He won the Independent Spirit Award for Best Actor. He also received his first Academy Award nomination for his performance. In 1987, Woods won the Primetime Emmy Award for Outstanding Lead Actor in a Limited Series or Movie for his role as a disabled man in the made-for-television film Promise (1986). The film also starred James Garner and Piper Laurie. In 1989, Woods won his second Primetime Emmy Award, for his role as the founder of Alcoholics Anonymous, Bill W. in the made-for-television drama film, My Name Is Bill W. starring James Garner and Gary Sinise.

In 1988, Woods portrayed a man struggling with cocaine addiction in The Boost. While the film received mixed reviews Woods' was praised for his performance with Critic Roger Ebert declaring that it was "one of the most convincing and horrifying portraits of drug addiction I've ever seen". He also added, "Woods is one of the most intense, unpredictable actors in the movies today. You watch his characters because they seem capable of exploding – not out of anger, but out of hurt, shame and low self-esteem. They're wounded, but they fight back by being smarter than anyone else and using jokes and sarcasm to keep people at arm's length." On October 28, 1989, Woods hosted Saturday Night Live with Don Henley as the musical guest. In 1989, Woods acted in the courtroom drama True Believer with Robert Downey Jr. and Yuji Okumoto and family drama Immediate Family acting alongside Glenn Close, Mary Stuart Masterson and Kevin Dillon. Of the latter, critic Roger Ebert noted of his performance "Woods is toned down from his other recent performances. He is the best actor in Hollywood at playing manics, crazies, hyperactive schemers and intelligent con men, but here he simply plays a more or less normal husband with ordinary desires and passions. He and Close make a convincing couple."

=== 1990–1999: Established actor ===
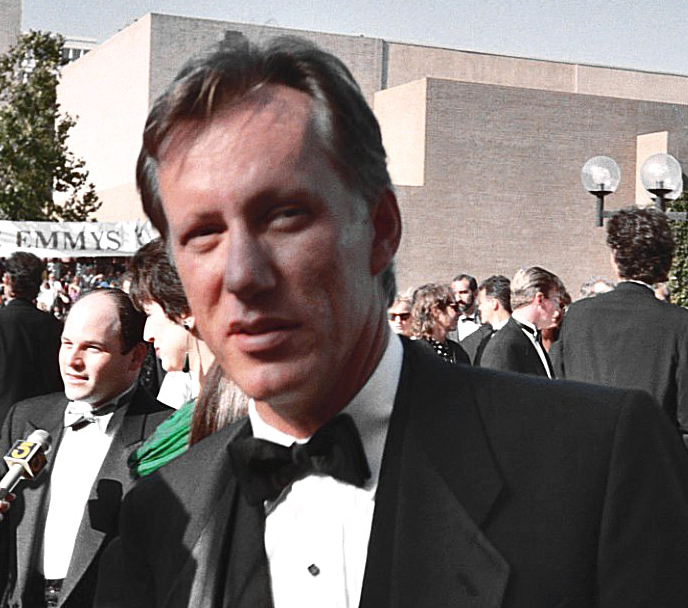
Woods at the Primetime Emmy Awards in 1992

Woods was offered a leading role in Quentin Tarantino's directorial debut, the low-budget film Reservoir Dogs (1992), but his agent rejected the script without showing it to the actor. When Woods learned of this some time later, he fired his agents (CAA), replacing them with ICM. That year, he did portray Roy Cohn in the HBO television film Citizen Cohn (1992) directed by Frank Pierson and featuring performances by Lee Grant, Frederic Forrest and Pat Hingle. Tony Scott of Variety praised the film and Woods writing, "It's Cohn's show and James Woods, in imaginative casting, is unnerving, ranging from the confused hospital-ridden patient to the smartly paced, homophobic gay prosecutor who knows every vicious trick to nail opponents. Woods's interp, chock-full of nuances, is masterful." For his performance he received nominations for the Golden Globe Award and the Primetime Emmy Award for Outstanding Actor in a Miniseries or TV Movie. He starred with Dolly Parton in the romantic comedy Straight Talk (1992). He also took a supporting role as attorney Joseph Scott in the Richard Attenborough directed biographical epic film Chaplin (1992) starring Robert Downey Jr.

Woods played a supporting role of a hustler, Lester Diamond, in Martin Scorsese's Casino (1995), alongside Robert De Niro, Sharon Stone and Joe Pesci. When Woods had heard that Scorsese was interested in working with him, he called Scorsese's office and left the following message: "Any time, any place, any part, any fee." The film was well received by critics, earning a positive rating on Rotten Tomatoes with the consensus reading, "Impressive ambition and bravura performances from an outstanding cast help Casino pay off in spite of a familiar narrative that may strike some viewers as a safe bet for director Martin Scorsese." Also in 1995, he starred as H. R. Haldeman in Oliver Stone's Nixon, opposite Anthony Hopkins as Richard Nixon. Woods received a Screen Actors Guild Award nomination along with the rest of the cast for its ensemble work. That same year, he acted in the HBO television film Indictment: The McMartin Trial acting opposite Mercedes Ruehl earning nominations for Golden Globe Award and the Primetime Emmy Award for Outstanding Actor in a Miniseries or TV Movie.

In Rob Reiner's film Ghosts of Mississippi (1996), Woods appeared alongside Alec Baldwin and Whoopi Goldberg. He portrayed Byron De La Beckwith, a white supremacist who assassinated civil rights leader Medgar Evers in 1963. The film was not a box-office success and received mixed reviews, earning a critics' review of 43% on Rotten Tomatoes. However, some critics praised Woods' performance. Janet Maslin, in her New York Times review, states, "Woods's performance as the hateful old reprobate Beckwith is the film's chief sign of life". The Los Angeles Times published an article titled "James Woods is So Good at Being Bad". In the articles it describes Woods having aggressively lobbied director Rob Reiner for the role, which Reiner originally intended for an actor in his 70s, like Paul Newman. "Beckwith's Mississippi accent, which Woods perfected by watching tapes and working with an accent coach, helped him distance himself from the character. 'I imagined I was speaking a foreign language'." Woods earned a Golden Globe nomination as well as his second Oscar nomination for Best Supporting Actor.

In 1997, Woods starred as the National Security Advisor in Robert Zemeckis's film Contact, opposite Jodie Foster. He later voiced Hades, the villainous god of the underworld, in the Disney animated film Hercules (1997), earning critical acclaim. Critic Roger Ebert described Woods' performance as full of "diabolical glee" and compared his performance of "verbal inventiveness" to that of Robin Williams as the Genie in Aladdin. Janet Maslin of The New York Times also praised Woods' performance remarking "Woods shows off the full verve of an edgy Scarfe villain". He reprised the role of Hades again in the television series of the same name (where he won a Daytime Emmy Award in 2000 for his work in season 2), as well as in House of Mouse (2001–2003), the Kingdom Hearts video game series, Disney Speedstorm (2023), and Once Upon a Studio (2023). He starred in Larry Clark's independent film Another Day in Paradise (1998) alongside Melanie Griffith. Woods appeared in Sofia Coppola's directorial debut The Virgin Suicides (1999) alongside Kirsten Dunst, Josh Hartnett and Kathleen Turner. The film premiered at the 1999 Cannes Film Festival to a largely positive critical reception. He also starred as Dr. Harvey Mandrake in Oliver Stone's sports drama Any Given Sunday (1999).

=== 2000–present ===
During the 2000s, Woods lent his voice to various films, video games, and television shows including another Disney film, Recess: School's Out (2001) as Dr. Phillium Benedict, the twisted former headmaster who attempts to abolish summer vacation. Woods would also voice Falcon in Stuart Little 2 (2002). He appeared in the Denzel Washington thriller John Q. (2002) and had a cameo in Be Cool (2005), featuring an all-star cast. In 2007, Woods voiced the role of Reggie Belafonte, a short-tempered sea otter, in the Sony Pictures Animation film, Surf's Up. The character is a Don King-like promoter for the main character's rival. The film went on to receive an Academy Award nomination for Best Animated Feature losing to Pixar's Ratatouille. From 2005 to 2016, Woods has played a recurring role as himself in Seth MacFarlane's Family Guy. He has continued to voice Hades in the Kingdom Hearts video games. Since 2016, he has also voiced the role of Lex Luthor in the animated series Justice League Action. From 2006 to 2008, Woods starred in the CBS legal drama series Shark. He played an infamous defense lawyer who, after growing disillusioned when his client commits a murder, becomes a successful prosecutor with the Los Angeles County District Attorney's office.

In 2011, Woods starred in the HBO television drama film Too Big to Fail based on the 2009 book of the same name by Andrew Ross Sorkin. He acted alongside Paul Giamatti, William Hurt, Cynthia Nixon, Tony Shalhoub and Bill Pullman. Woods played Richard S. Fuld, Jr., chairman and CEO of Lehman Brothers. Ken Tucker of Entertainment Weekly praised Woods' writing that he "embodyed the role with macho aggression with snake-oil smoothness". For his performance Woods earned nominations for the Screen Actors Guild Award for Outstanding Performance by a Male Actor in a Miniseries or Television Movie and Primetime Emmy Award for Outstanding Supporting Actor in a Limited or Anthology Series or Movie. In 2012, Woods appeared in the limited series Coma alongside Geena Davis, Richard Dreyfuss, and Ellen Burstyn. The series was produced by Ridley Scott, and Tony Scott and premiered on A&E. In 2013, Woods appeared in Roland Emmerich's White House Down. That same year, he joined Showtime's critically acclaimed series Ray Donovan in a recurring role as Patrick "Sully" Sullivan also starring Liev Schreiber, and Jon Voight.

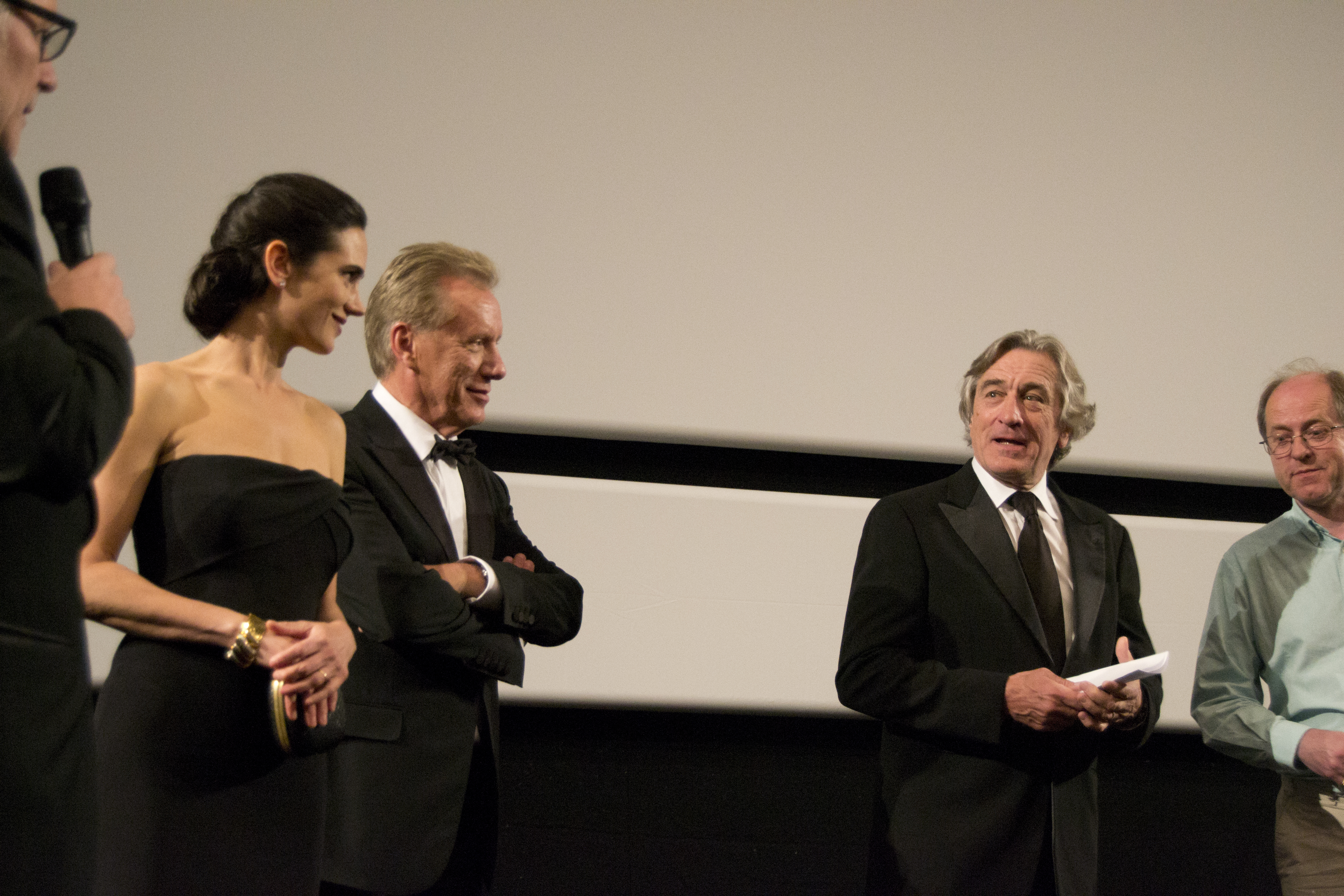
Jennifer Connelly, Woods, and Robert De Niro at a screening of Once Upon a Time in America at the Cannes Film Festival in 2012

He also appeared as a fictional version of himself in the episode of The Simpsons entitled "Homer and Apu" and in eight episodes of Family Guy, which is set in Woods' home state of Rhode Island. He is also the namesake for James Woods Regional High School in Family Guy. The high school's name was later changed to Adam West High School to reflect the death of Adam West, who was a character in the show. Woods has lent his voice to video games such as Grand Theft Auto: San Andreas. In 2012, Woods attended an anniversary screening of a restored cut of Once Upon a Time in America (1984) at the 65th Cannes Film Festival. The screening was made possible by Martin Scorsese and his Film Foundation which digitally restored the film as well as included 40 additional minutes of footage. Woods, Robert De Niro, Jennifer Connelly, and Elizabeth McGovern attended the premiere and introduced the film.

In 2014, Woods joined Robert De Niro for an anniversary screening of Once Upon a Time in America (1984) at the 52nd New York Film Festival at Film Society at Lincoln Center.

In 2017, Woods appeared at the Writers Guild of America Awards to honor his friend Oliver Stone, with whom he had collaborated three times (Salvador, Nixon, and Any Given Sunday), who was receiving the lifetime achievement award. During the ceremony, Woods bantered with liberal host Patton Oswalt. Woods served as an executive producer on Christopher Nolan's biographical thriller Oppenheimer (2023). Woods and J. David Wargo were thanked when the film won the Academy Award for Best Picture by producer Charles Roven who credited them for giving him the book American Prometheus: The Triumph and Tragedy of J. Robert Oppenheimer which was the basis for the film.

In 2024, he released the album “Hear The Thunder Crack”, where he wrote all the lyrics and words, while Shooter Jennings created and performed the music.

== Personal life ==
=== Marriages and relationships ===
In 1980, Woods married costume designer Kathryn Morrison-Pahoa. They divorced in 1983. In 1989, he married 26-year-old equestrian and boutique owner Sarah Owen, but they divorced four months later. In 1992, Woods dated Heather Graham, his co-star in the film Diggstown.

Woods was raised as Roman Catholic and considers himself a practicing follower of the religion.

=== Interests ===
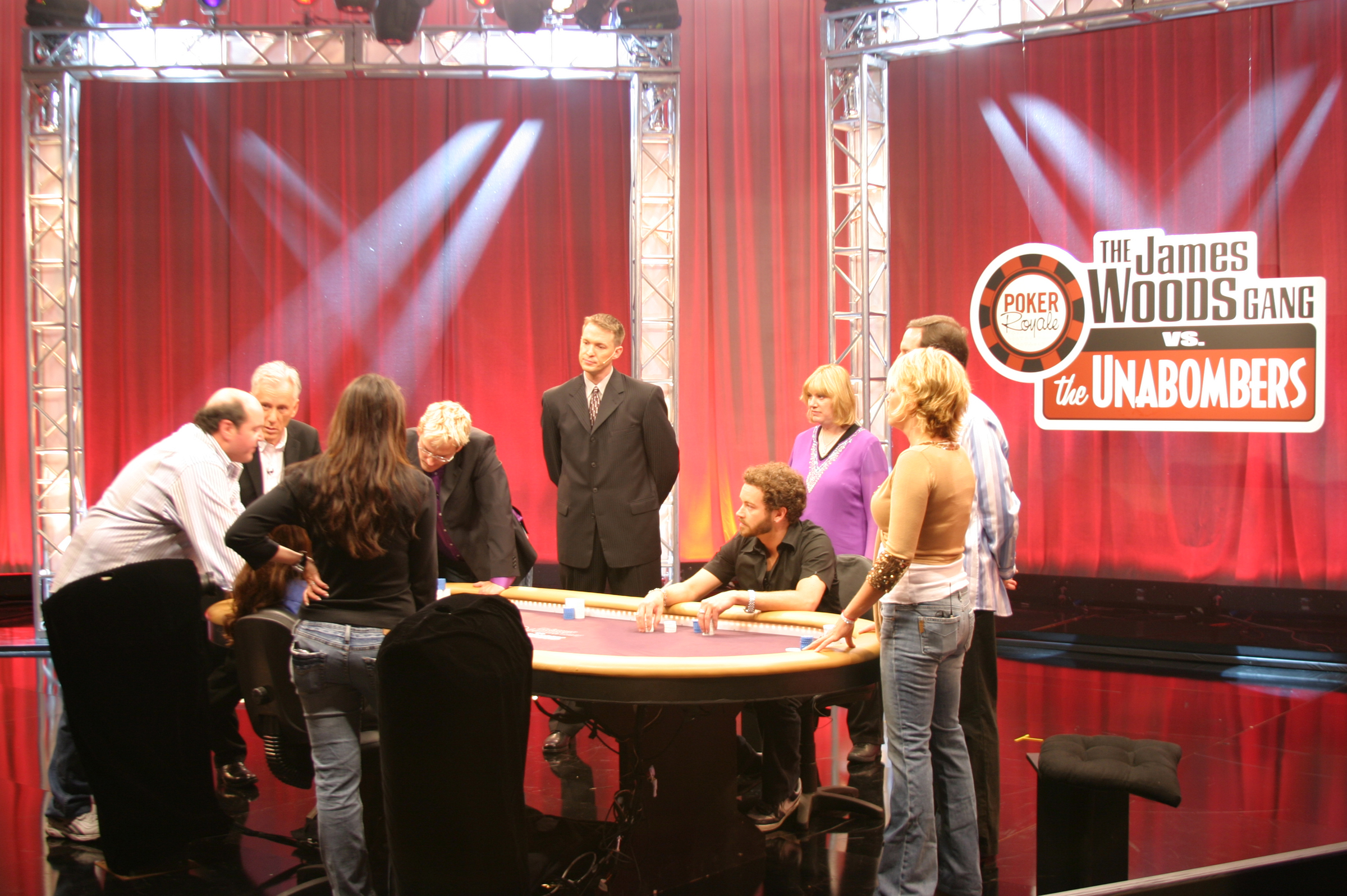
Woods playing poker at the Pechanga Resort Casino in Temecula, California, 2005

During a press interview for Kingdom Hearts II (2005), Woods said that he was an avid gamer. He is a dealer of antiques in Rhode Island.

Woods is an avid poker player, playing in cash games and many tournaments. He played in the World Poker Tour's Hollywood Home Game series in 2004 for the American Stroke Association charity. As of 2018, he has over 80 tournament successes to his credit, including seventh place at the 2015 World Series of Poker in the $3000 No Limit Shootout event and fifth place in the $1,500 Dealers Choice event at the 2018 World Series of Poker, as well as a $12,000 poker win in 2022 at Bally's Las Vegas.

=== Legal issues ===
In 1988, Woods sued actress Sean Young for $2 million, accusing her of stalking him after they appeared together in the film The Boost. Young later countered that Woods had overreacted when she had spurned his on-set advances. The suit was settled out of court in August 1989, including a payment of $227,000 to Young to cover her legal costs.

In 2006, Woods' younger brother, Michael Jeffrey Woods, died from cardiac arrest at the age of 49. Woods sued Kent Hospital in Warwick, Rhode Island, alleging negligence. The lawsuit was settled in 2009.

In July 2015, Woods sued an anonymous Twitter user known as Abe List, and ten other Twitter users, for $10 million over an allegedly libelous tweet accusing him of being a "cocaine addict". Woods unsuccessfully sought to obtain the name of the Twitter user; the Los Angeles County Superior Court denied his motion for discovery in October 2015, holding that he could not "use legal process to pierce the anonymity of internet speakers unless [he] can make a prima facie case." However, in an unexpected later ruling, the user's Anti-SLAPP motion was denied and Woods was permitted to pursue his lawsuit against List, with the ten other defendants being dropped from the lawsuit. In October 2016, the defendant's appeal was dismissed; attorney Lisa Bloom, who represented the anonymous Twitter user, revealed that the user had died. The case was settled out of court soon afterwards, with Woods receiving a letter from Bloom saying that her client "regretted making the tweet and further regrets any harm caused to Mr. Woods' reputation by the tweet."

In 2017, shortly before the Abe List litigation was resolved, Portia Boulger sued Woods for misidentifying her as a Nazi in an allegedly libelous tweet. The tweet included a photo of a different woman giving a Nazi salute while wearing a Donald Trump t-shirt at a campaign event. Boulger sought $3 million in damages. The court ruled in favor of Woods under the innocent construction rule. Boulger appealed, but the United States Court of Appeals for the Sixth Circuit upheld the ruling.

In September 2017, Amber Tamblyn wrote an open letter to Woods accusing him of inviting her and her friend to Las Vegas when she was 16. Woods denied the story. The same month, actress Katie Aselton said that she also had "a James Woods story" from when she was 19 years old, asking "how many of us are there?" In November 2017, actress Elizabeth Perkins, at a #MeToo rally, accused Woods of sexual misconduct.

=== Political views and Twitter use ===
Woods has stated that he was a member of the Democratic Party until the impeachment of Bill Clinton in 1999, commenting that "every single Democrat without exception stood behind a convicted perjurer. That was the end." Woods was a registered Independent during the presidencies of George W. Bush and Barack Obama; he since aligned himself with the Republican Party until 2026, when he stated that he is an Independent now, calling himself "done with the Republican Party" because most of them "rejected her [Nancy Mace, a House Republican] motion to subpoena Democratic Rep. Ilhan Omar's immigration records" and didn't pass the SAVE ACT, saying he is still "a devout follower of President Trump." When Carly Fiorina pulled out of the 2016 presidential race, he shifted his endorsement to Ted Cruz in November 2015. Woods has defended U.S. President Donald Trump in the media, and has been described as a "staunch Trump supporter".

Woods' name was in an advertisement in the Los Angeles Times (August 17, 2006) that condemned Hamas and Hezbollah and supported Israel in the 2006 Lebanon War.

On July 4, 2018, The Gersh Agency notified Woods by email that they would no longer represent him. Woods accused the agency of liberal political bias due to his outspoken conservative views. Woods has said there were many conservative actors who don't share their thoughts because "the blacklist against conservatives in Hollywood is very real." Woods announced that he was retiring due to being blacklisted.

Woods frequently expressed his conservative political views on Twitter and was locked out of his account multiple times for violations of the platform's terms of service. In 2017, a Twitter debate between Woods and Amber Tamblyn escalated after Tamblyn accused Woods of inviting her to Las Vegas when she was underage, a claim Woods dismissed as a lie.

In July 2017, Woods responded to a Twitter post of an Orange County family attending an LGBT pride event with their 10-year-old son by stating, "Wait until this poor kid grows up, realizes what you've done, and stuffs both of you dismembered into a freezer in the garage." Neil Patrick Harris, a friend of the family, condemned Woods’ comments as "utterly ignorant and classless."

In 2018, Woods turned his Twitter feed into a bulletin board for missing evacuees of the California wildfires, and was credited with saving lives and helping to reunite missing loved ones and pets with their families. He provided aid to actresses Holly Marie Combs and Alyssa Milano, with the latter thanking him for his help saving her horses.

In 2022, analysis conducted by researchers with the University of Washington's Center for an Informed Public and the Krebs-Stamos Group found Woods was the top purveyor of election misinformation on Twitter during late 2020. That same year, Woods announced his intentions to sue the Democratic National Committee following Elon Musk's release of the Twitter Files. Journalist Matt Taibbi reported that the Democratic National Committee (DNC) had requested that a tweet made by Woods, related to Hunter Biden, be removed from Twitter. Critics of Woods defended Twitter's decision by pointing out that Woods had posted images of Hunter Biden's genitals to his account.

In the wake of the October 7 attacks in 2023, Woods has strongly criticized Hamas for "savage terrorism". He criticized Joe Biden on Twitter for failing to do more to secure the release of the twelve American hostages abducted to the Gaza Strip by Hamas amid the Gaza war hostage crisis.

In November 2023, he advocated against a ceasefire in the Gaza war, further calling for the killing of all Palestinian activists with the hashtag "#KillThemAll". In February 2024, he criticized Rashida Tlaib for her lone "present" vote as the United States House of Representatives voted unanimously to condemn rape and sexual violence committed by Hamas in its war against Israel. He has condemned 2024 pro-Palestinian protests on university campuses, claiming that they foment antisemitism and show support for Hamas. On June 27, 2026, Woods posted a graphic on his X account which read: Diversity is code for white extinction.

=== 9/11 experience ===
Woods has alleged noticing four men near him acting suspiciously on an August 1, 2001 flight from Boston to Los Angeles. Woods reported his suspicions to the co-pilot in flight, and he claimed that those concerns were passed on to the Federal Aviation Administration. On the evening of September 11, Woods called the Federal Bureau of Investigation (FBI) and repeated his concerns; they interviewed him at his home the next morning. Woods believed that he had encountered four of the 19 terrorists/hijackers responsible for the September 11 attacks, who were on the flight to study it in preparation for the attacks. Woods was interviewed by FBI agents regarding this incident. He has stated that he looked at pictures of the hijackers and identified two terrorists as being among the men that he had seen on his flight.

== Acting credits ==
Woods' career spans five decades and includes collaborations with some of the most acclaimed filmmakers of his time, such as John Carpenter, Elia Kazan, Martin Scorsese, David Cronenberg, Sergio Leone, Clint Eastwood, Sydney Pollack, Arthur Penn, Oliver Stone, Rob Reiner, Robert Zemeckis, Roland Emmerich, Richard Attenborough, and Sofia Coppola.

Selected credits:

- The Visitors (1972)
- The Way We Were (1973)
- Night Moves (1975)
- The Onion Field (1979)
- The Incredible Journey of Doctor Meg Laurel (1979)
- The Black Marble (1980)
- Eyewitness (1981)
- Fast-Walking (1982)
- Videodrome (1983)
- Once Upon a Time in America (1984)
- Against All Odds (1984)
- Cat's Eye (1985)
- Salvador (1986)
- Best Seller (1987)
- The Boost (1988)
- Cop (1988)
- True Believer (1989)
- Immediate Family (1989)
- The Hard Way (1991)
- Straight Talk (1992)
- Diggstown (1992)
- Chaplin (1992)
- The Getaway (1994)
- The Specialist (1994)
- Casino (1995)
- Nixon (1995)
- Ghosts of Mississippi (1996)
- Hercules (1997) (Voice)
- Contact (1997)
- Vampires (1998)
- Another Day in Paradise (1998)
- True Crime (1999)
- Any Given Sunday (1999)
- The Virgin Suicides (1999)
- Recess: School's Out (2001) (Voice)
- Scary Movie 2 (2001)
- John Q. (2002)
- Stuart Little 2 (2002) (Voice)
- Be Cool (2005)
- Surf's Up (2007) (Voice)
- White House Down (2013)
- Jobs (2013)

== Awards and nominations ==
For his work in film, Woods has received two Academy Award nominations for his performances in Oliver Stone's Salvador (1987), and Rob Reiner's Ghosts of Mississippi (1996). Woods has also received many award nominations for his performances in television such as Primetime Emmy Award, and a Golden Globe Award for his performance in the made-for-television film Promise (1986), and won his second Primetime Emmy Award for his performance in My Name is Bill W. (1989). He also received three Screen Actors Guild Award nominations and three Independent Spirit Award nominations winning for Salvador.

Award	Year	Category	Nominated work	Result
Academy Awards	1987	Best Actor	Salvador	Nominated
Academy Awards	1997	Best Supporting Actor	Ghosts of Mississippi	Nominated
Daytime Emmy Awards	2000	Outstanding Performer in an Animated Program	Hercules: The Animated Series	Won
Golden Globe Awards	1980	Best Actor – Motion Picture Drama	The Onion Field	Nominated
Golden Globe Awards	1987	Best Actor – Miniseries or Television Film	Promise	Won
Golden Globe Awards	1988	Best Actor – Miniseries or Television Film	In Love and War	Nominated
Golden Globe Awards	1990	Best Actor – Miniseries or Television Film	My Name Is Bill W.	Nominated
Golden Globe Awards	1993	Best Actor – Miniseries or Television Film	Citizen Cohn	Nominated
Golden Globe Awards	1996	Best Actor – Miniseries or Television Film	Indictment: The McMartin Trial	Nominated
Golden Globe Awards	1997	Best Supporting Actor – Motion Picture	Ghosts of Mississippi	Nominated
Golden Globe Awards	2001	Best Actor – Miniseries or Television Film	Dirty Pictures	Nominated
Independent Spirit Award	1987	Best Male Lead	Salvador	Won
Independent Spirit Award	1988	Best Male Lead	Best Seller	Nominated
Independent Spirit Award	1989	Best Male Lead	The Boost	Nominated
Primetime Emmy Award	1987	Outstanding Lead Actor in a Miniseries or a Movie	Promise	Won
Primetime Emmy Award	1989	Outstanding Lead Actor in a Miniseries or a Movie	My Name Is Bill W.	Won
Primetime Emmy Award	1993	Outstanding Lead Actor in a Miniseries or a Movie	Citizen Cohn	Nominated
Primetime Emmy Award	1995	Outstanding Lead Actor in a Miniseries or a Movie	Indictment: The McMartin Trial	Nominated
Primetime Emmy Award	2003	Outstanding Lead Actor in a Miniseries or a Movie	Rudy: The Rudy Giuliani Story	Nominated
Primetime Emmy Award	2006	Outstanding Guest Actor in a Drama Series	ER	Nominated
Primetime Emmy Award	2011	Outstanding Supporting Actor in a Miniseries or a Movie	Too Big to Fail	Nominated
Screen Actors Guild Awards	1996	Cast in a Motion Picture	Nixon	Nominated
Screen Actors Guild Awards	2001	Outstanding Actor in a Miniseries or Television Movie	Dirty Pictures	Nominated
Screen Actors Guild Awards	2012	Outstanding Actor in a Miniseries or Television Movie	Too Big to Fail	Nominated

- On October 15, 1998, Woods was inducted into the Hollywood Walk of Fame with a star at 7021 Hollywood Blvd.
