= Gerald Green (film producer) =

American film producer

- Born: 10 January 1932; Cape Town, South Africa
- Died: 24 July 2015 (aged 83); Los Angeles, California, US
- Occupation: Film producer
- Years active: 1975-2006
- Spouse: Patricia Green

Gerald Green (January 10, 1932 – July 24, 2015) was a film producer, born in Cape Town, South Africa.

He studied at Saint Martin's School of Art in London and moved to the United States in 1970. He produced Oliver Stone's 1986 film Salvador.

He and his wife were arrested in 2010 in Los Angeles and charged with money-laundering and bribery offences in connection with a film festival in Thailand. They were sentenced to six months imprisonment.

He died in Los Angeles, California from complications from emphysema.
