= 2nd Independent Spirit Awards =

US film awards ceremony in 1987

- Date: March 28, 1987
- Site: Los Angeles, California, U.S.
- Hosted by: Buck Henry

Highlights
- Best Film: Platoon
- Most awards: Platoon (4)
- Most nominations: Blue Velvet (6); Salvador (6)

The 2nd Independent Spirit Awards, honoring the best in independent filmmaking for 1986, were announced on March 28, 1987. The ceremony was hosted by Buck Henry and was held at 385 North, a restaurant in Los Angeles.

== Winners and nominees ==
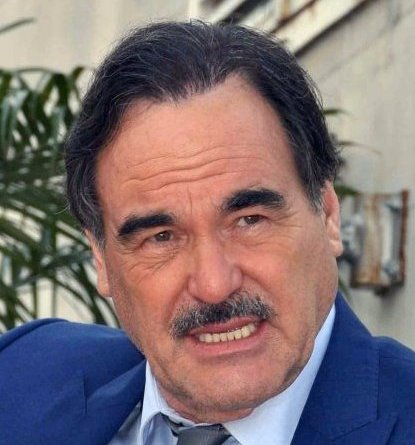
Oliver Stone, Best Director & Best Screenplay winner

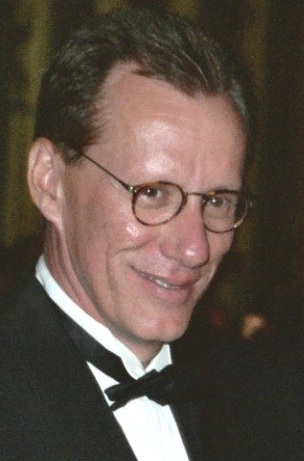
James Woods, Best Male Lead winner

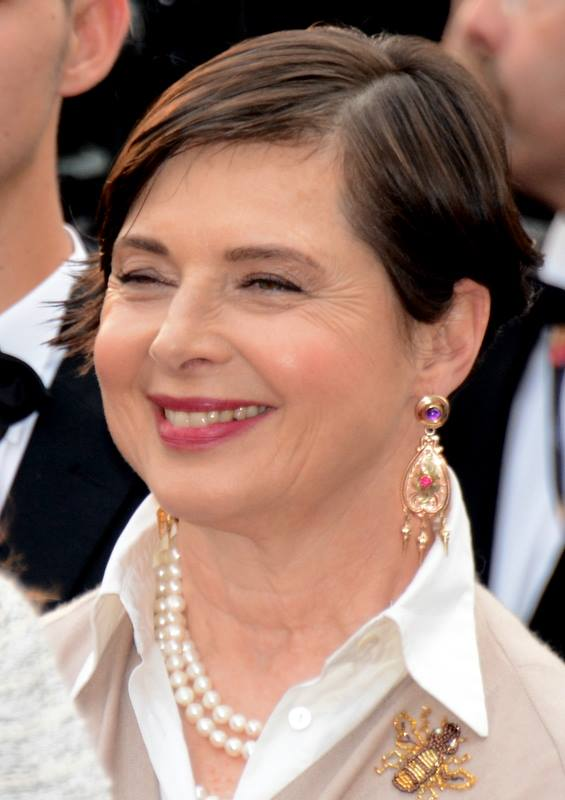
Isabella Rossellini, Best Female Lead winner

Best Feature	Best Director
Platoon: Blue Velvet; Down by Law; On Valentine's Day; Salvador; Stand by Me	Oliver Stone – Platoon: Jim Jarmusch – Down by Law; David Lynch – Blue Velvet; Rob Reiner – Stand by Me; Oliver Stone – Salvador
Best Male Lead	Best Female Lead
James Woods – Salvador: Roberto Benigni – Down by Law; Willem Dafoe – Platoon; Dennis Hopper – Blue Velvet; Victor Love – Native Son	Isabella Rossellini – Blue Velvet: Elpidia Carrillo – Salvador; Patricia Charbonneau – Desert Hearts; Laura Dern – Blue Velvet; Tracy Camilla Johns – She's Gotta Have It
Best Screenplay	Best First Feature
Platoon – Oliver Stone: Blue Velvet – David Lynch; A Great Wall – Peter Wang and Shirley Sun; Salvador – Oliver Stone and Richard Boyle; Stand by Me – Raynold Gideon and Bruce A. Evans	She's Gotta Have It – Spike Lee: Belizaire the Cajun; A Great Wall; Hoosiers - David Anspaugh; True Stories - David Byrne
Best Cinematography
Platoon – Robert Richardson: Blue Velvet – Frederick Elmes; Down by Law – Robby Müller; Salvador – Robert Richardson; True Stories – Edward Lachman

=== Films with multiple nominations and awards ===
Films that received multiple nominations
Nominations	Film
6	Blue Velvet
6	Salvador
5	Platoon
3	Down by Law
3	Stand by Me
2	She's Gotta Have It
2	True Stories

Films that won multiple awards
Awards	Film
4	Platoon

== Special awards ==
=== Special Distinction Award ===
A Room with a View

- 28 Up
- Men...
- Mona Lisa
- My Beautiful Laundrette
