= The Perfect Moment =

Retrospective of works by American photographer Robert Mapplethorpe

The Perfect Moment was the most comprehensive retrospective of works by New York photographer Robert Mapplethorpe. The show spanned twenty-five years of his career, featuring celebrity portraits, self-portraits, interracial figure studies, floral still lifes, homoerotic images, and collages. The exhibition, organized by Janet Kardon of the Institute of Contemporary Arts in Philadelphia, opened in the winter of 1988 just months before Mapplethorpe's death from AIDS complications on March 9, 1989. On tour, in the summer of 1989, the exhibition became the centerpiece of a controversy concerning US federal funding of the arts and censorship.

== Exhibition ==
=== Background ===
The Perfect Moment covered all aspects of the photographer's career from the late 1960s to 1988. The traveling exhibition had been scheduled to appear at five other museums in various regions of the country during the next year and a half. It included more than 150 images. Despite the controversial character of some of the photographs, critical response was enthusiastic and attendance was robust throughout the show's Philadelphia run (from December 1988 through January 1989).

The Perfect Moment traveled to the Museum of Contemporary Art in Chicago. Again, it generated no unfavorable public or critical attention. In June 1989, after the cancellation of the exhibition by the Corcoran Gallery of Art in Washington D.C., two and a half weeks before it was to open there, The Perfect Moment unexpectedly provoked national controversy and ICA became a key player in the congressional debate over what public funds should and should not fund. The issues of censorship and artistic freedom that the show raised occupied the forefront of the debates between conservatives and liberals during the Ronald Reagan era and in its aftermath. Members of the religious right, especially, criticized academics and artists for what they regarded as their indecent, subversive and blasphemous works.

=== Layout and works displayed ===
The Perfect Moment grouped photos into three categories:

- Rigorously conceived portraits and figure studies;
- Dramatically lit flower arrangements in color, and in black and white;
- Photographs of gay sadomasochism (S&M) that left nothing to the imagination.

Robert Mapplethorpe's XYZ portfolios explored three subjects: homosexual sadomasochism (X); flower still lifes (Y); and nude portraits of African American men (Z). The extremely graphic S&M photos from Mapplethorpe's X Portfolio were displayed in a separate, age-restricted area at each venue of the exhibition. The portfolios were displayed with a series of poems by poet and singer Patti Smith. The poems echo Mapplethorpe's X, Y, Z trope.

"Y is the symbol of the covenant which exists between the artist and his creator/ Y is the consummation of this idea thru the projection of the perfect shot. "Please use the poetry as sandwich quotes; I want them to be obvious." (Patti Smith)

The images that sparked the most controversy include:

- Jim and Tom, Sausalito, 1977
- Man in a Polyester Suit, 1980
- Jesse McBride, 1976
- Rosie (Honey), 1976

Rosie, a black and white portrait of a very young girl crouched down on a bench outdoors with part of her dress lifted, exposing her genitals, generated controversy because of the subject's age and the issue of consent. This photograph was deemed child pornography by Mapplethorpe's detractors, and it is surprising that it was featured in the exhibition catalogue, considering that the printer had refused to print it for the Mapplethorpe retrospective at the Whitney Museum of Art in 1988. There was one other photograph of a naked child, "Jesse McBride" which also contributed to the controversy created by "Rosie".

A 55-minute videotape of a BBC interview with the photographer accompanied the exhibition.

== Reception ==
The art critics in Philadelphia, the show's first venue, critiqued Mapplethorpe's work along formalist lines, without commenting on the provocative content of the X portfolio photographs. Overall, the exhibition was met enthusiastically by critics both Philadelphia and in Chicago, where the show appeared at the Museum of Contemporary Art.

However, a campaign launched by the American Family Association, a conservative watchdog group, to censor what they considered "indecent" art changed the climate of reception. On June 12, 1989 Christina Orr-Cahall, the director of the Corcoran Gallery of Art, cancelled The Perfect Moment, which was scheduled to open there on June 30. Orr-Cahall feared that The Perfect Moment would endanger NEA appropriations in the United States Congress.

The exhibition set off one of the fiercest episodes of America's "culture wars" — and sparked a recurring debate about state-funded cultural production and the support of sexually explicit or sacrilegious art by public funds.

=== Debate about National Endowment for the Arts ===
The canceling of the Perfect Moment provoked a censorship battle about national funding for the arts that was front-page news for the next year.

On June 30, 1989, protesters angered by the cancellation of the show by the Corcoran Gallery projected slides of Mapplethorpe's photographs on the facade of the museum. 700 people rallied to express their outrage about the Corcoran's decision. Michael Brenson, art critic for the New York Times wrote, "This exhibit should be seen. It is extremely unfortunate that the Corcoran Gallery of Art canceled it last month in the hope of averting a political outcry. As much as he has been made out to be a renegade and outlaw, Mapplethorpe is an utterly mainstream artist. He loved freshness and glamor and was obsessed with the moment, which his photographs always reflect. In his restricted spaces and his feeling for abstraction and attentiveness to every shape, edge and texture, Mapplethorpe is a child of the Formalism of the 1960s." The Washington Project for the Arts (WPA) stepped in to host the show, and on July 22, 1989, The Perfect Moment opened at this alternative art space. No incidents marred the show's run at the Washington Project for the Arts.

However, Senator Jesse Helms introduced legislation that would stop the NEA from funding artwork considered "obscene". The legislation subsequently required any recipients of NEA funds to sign an oath that declared they would not promote obscenity. The oath provoked protests from artists and arts organizations. During the next grant cycle, in this climate of fear, applications for support equaling hundreds of thousands of dollars were rejected. Outraged artists filed lawsuits against the agency. A compromise was reached in Congress. Although the radically restrictive Helms amendment did not pass, restrictions were placed on NEA funding procedures.

=== Censorship ===
In March 1990, the anti-pornography Citizens for Community Values in Cincinnati, Ohio, launched a campaign to pressure the Contemporary Arts Center (CAC) to cancel The Perfect Moment. Cincinnati law enforcement ordered 400 visitors from the museum to leave while they videotaped Mapplethorpe's photographs as evidence to support obscenity charges brought against Dennis Barrie, the director of the CAC, and against the CAC. This was the first time a museum in the United States faced prosecution for the art it displayed.

On October 5, 1990, Barrie and the CAC were acquitted in the obscenity case. The prosecution failed to convince the jury that Mapplethorpe's photographs lacked artistic merit. In Cincinnati, more than 80,000 people saw the show. The censorship proceedings doubtless brought more attention to Mapplethorpe's work than it would have otherwise received.

=== Legacy ===
Since the CAC debacle, images from The Perfect Moment, including the X, Y, and Z portfolios, have circulated in hundreds of exhibitions internationally. Mapplethorpe's work is currently represented by 12 galleries worldwide, with the largest collections of his works at the Solomon R. Guggenheim Museum and The Los Angeles County Museum of Art (LACMA) and the J. Paul Getty Trust. These photographs and history of their attempted censorship during the 1990s have influenced artists, inspired LGBTQ advocates, and generated much scholarship.
