= Formica Building =

Coordinates: 39°6′4″N 84°30′40″W

- Interactive map of the Formica Building area

General information
- Type: Office, Retail, Event Hall, Museum (formerly)
- Location: 115 East Fifth Street; Cincinnati, Ohio 45202
- Construction started: 1969
- Completed: 1970
- Owner: MCA Center

Technical details
- Floor count: 15
- Lifts/elevators: 4

Design and construction
- Architect: Harry Weese

The Formica Building (also known as the Mercantile Center) is a mixed-use building in Cincinnati, Ohio, United States.

== History ==
The building opened in 1970 and was designed by Chicago architect Harry Weese, perhaps best known for designing the Metro stations in Washington, D.C. The building contains both an office tower and arcade connecting Fourth Street with Fifth Street as well as providing access to the Cincinnati Skywalk system. The building originally contained the Formica Corporation headquarters, and the Contemporary Arts Center (CAC) was located on the second floor of the arcade. At the time, it was the largest exhibition venue devoted to contemporary art in the United States. Prior to moving to the Lois & Richard Rosenthal Center for Contemporary Art in 2003, the CAC featured work by noteworthy artists such as Robert Morris, Jennifer Bartlett and Maya Angelou. The iconic Nam June Paik sculpture Metrobot stood in front of the building from 1988 to 2009.

Until recently, the space formerly known as the Contemporary Arts Center has remained vacant. Recognizing the need for a unique venue in downtown Cincinnati, MCA Center worked with Cincinnati designers to reinvent the space's identity as The Center. In 2024, the Model Group renovated the Mercantile Center and Formica Building into a mixed-use residential development.
