= Stikman =

American street artist

stikman
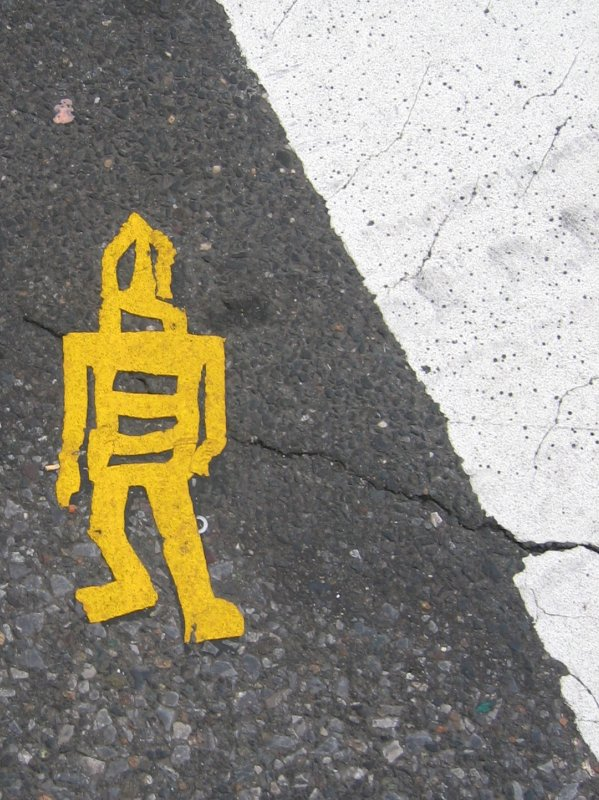
- stikman figure, New York City
- Born: Philadelphia
- Movement: Street art

stikman (stylized lowercase) is a pseudonymous American street artist best known for placing images of humanoid, robot-like stick figures on the sidewalks of cities across the United States.

== Background ==
He is reported to be Philadelphia native. He has been active in street art since the 1960s, when he began his career at age 14 with anti-war graffiti.

== Street art ==
He has been creating the stikman figures that he is best known for since the 1990s. These are usually made of yellow linoleum-like pavement marking tape that becomes embedded in the asphalt over time, The artist places the figures, most frequently on crosswalks, without any direct indication of authorship. This has led to articles in the media investigating the origin and authorship of the figures. While they are frequently interpreted as robot figures, the artist has said that they are simply "little men made of sticks".

A Washington Post article stated that the Washington, D.C. area had over 150 stikman images embedded in its sidewalks in 2008. The figures have also been placed in New York City, Boston, Los Angeles, Philadelphia, Wheeling, West Virginia, Ann Arbor, Michigan, Minneapolis, Minnesota, San Francisco, and Chicago.

stikman has also created the figures in other styles and media.

Although known primarily for works placed on the street, the artist has also been featured in gallery exhibitions. Works by stikman were selected for Amazon's first collection of limited-edition prints by seven international street artists.
