= Diggstown =

1992 film by Michael Ritchie

- Theatrical release poster
- Directed by: Michael Ritchie
- Written by: Steven McKay
- Based on: The Diggstown Ringers by Leonard Wise
- Produced by: Robert Schaffel
- Starring: James Woods; Louis Gossett Jr.; Oliver Platt; Heather Graham; Bruce Dern
- Cinematography: Gerry Fisher
- Edited by: Don Zimmerman
- Music by: James Newton Howard
- Production company: Eclectic Films
- Distributed by: Metro-Goldwyn-Mayer
- Release date: August 14, 1992
- Running time: 98 minutes
- Country: United States
- Language: English
- Budget: $15 million
- Box office: $4.8 million

Diggstown (known as Midnight Sting in the UK and Ireland), is a 1992 American sports comedy-drama film directed by Michael Ritchie and written by Steven McKay, based on the 1978 novel The Diggstown Ringers by Leonard Wise. It stars James Woods, Louis Gossett Jr., Bruce Dern, Heather Graham, Oliver Platt, and Randall "Tex" Cobb.

== Plot ==
After being released from prison in Winfield, Georgia, con man Gabriel Caine gets to work on his next scam. Caine and his partner, Daniel Patrick O'Shannon "Fitz" Fitzpatrick, travel to a small town near the prison: Diggstown, a city obsessed with boxing.

John Gillon owns almost all of Diggstown. He is the former manager of Diggstown's once-famous boxer Charles Macom Diggs, the man for whom the town is named.

Upon hearing that Diggs once knocked out five fighters in one day, Fitz says he knows of a fighter who could knock out any ten in one day: "Honey" Roy Palmer. Gillon bets $100,000 that no one can best ten Diggstown boxers in one day. Caine volunteers to finance Fitz's bet, and the con is on.

Caine seeks out Palmer, a 48-year-old YMCA supervisor. Palmer reluctantly agrees to participate and starts to train for the fight. Caine and Gillon agree to various conditions of the bet, with "one day" being 24 full hours and "Diggstown fighters" being able to come from any surrounding area of Olivair County. A loan shark Victor Corsini backs Caine's bet.

As his manager, Gillon drugged Diggs during a fight with amyl nitrate so that Gillon could collect on the opponent's long odds. Diggs suffered irreversible brain damage as a result. Aided by Emily Forrester, sister of Caine's ex-cellmate Edward "Wolf" Forrester, Gillon has more than $1.5 million in assets. Caine tricks him into risking all of it. Now it is up to Palmer to defeat all 10 of Diggstown's men.

They begin with:

- Buck Holland, whom Palmer beats.
- Slim Busby, who was bribed by Caine to take a dive.
- Billy Hargrove, who is beat.
- Sam Lester, who is secretly given a laxative before the fight and eventually runs from the ring.
- Hambone Busby, who, like his brother Slim, was bribed to take a dive. Gillon, however, threatens to kill Slim, unless Hambone wins. Hambone fights, but is defeated. Slim is later found murdered.

Palmer's next fight is with Sonny Hawkins, who is dispatched. Robby Gillon, the son of John, approaches the ring next, but then backs out under instructions from his father. His cowardice is regarded as a forfeit. Frank Mangrum loses to disqualification after kicking Palmer in the groin and hitting the referee. Palmer then knocks him out. Tank Miller, another fighter, is next. Palmer beats him.

That brings up Diggstown's best man, Hammerhead Hagan, the only fighter ever to actually beat Palmer during their professional careers. He is brought in as a surprise ringer. Gillon moved him in as a county resident before the bet rules were established, meaning that Hagan can legally fight.

The bout is one-sided. Palmer is exhausted, but gets new motivation after seeing Diggs, who is sitting ringside, move his hand slightly (which he interprets as a show of support). Caine, not wanting to see his friend die, attempts to throw in the towel, but Palmer catches it and throws it back. Palmer rallies to knock out his opponent.

Palmer, Caine and Fitz begin to celebrate. They are cut short by Gillon, who notes that Robby never entered the ring -– therefore, only nine fights transpired. The true tenth fighter is then introduced: Minoso Torres, who ruled the boxing underground in the prison from which Caine was released. No one ever defeated him.

Palmer is no match for Torres. However, Caine eventually whistles at Torres, gets his attention, straightens his tie and does a thumbs-down gesture. Torres drops his gloves and invites Palmer to hit him, hitting the canvas, knocked out. Caine was expecting such a trick from Gillon and bribed Torres long before for a moment like this.

Gillon loses everything. He eventually snaps and pulls a gun, firing off a round before his son stops him. Palmer grabs Gillon and prepares to deck him. Instead, he turns to Hambone, claiming, "My hands hurt. You want to do this?" Hambone obliges and delivers Gillon a knockout blow.

After the fight, Caine and Palmer sit together in the empty gym. Caine tells Palmer what he did couldn't be done. Palmer responds by saying "now you motivate me."

== Cast ==
- James Woods as Gabriel Caine
- Louis Gossett Jr. as "Honey" Roy Palmer
- Bruce Dern as John Clayton Gillon
- Oliver Platt as Daniel Patrick O'Shannon "Fitz" Fitzpatrick
- Heather Graham as Emily Forrester
- Randall "Tex" Cobb as Edward "Wolf" Forrester
- Thomas Wilson Brown as Robby Gillon
- Duane Davis as Hambone Busby
- Willie Green as Hammerhead Hagan
- Orestes Matacena as Victor Corsini
- Michael McGrady as Frank Mangrum
- Roger Hewlett as Sam Lester
- Rocky Pepeli as Buck Holland
- Jeff Benson as Tank Miller
- Jim Caviezel as Billy Hargrove
- Frank Collison as Prison Guard
- Marshall Bell as Warden Bates
- Raymond C. Turner as Slim Busby
- Wilhelm von Homburg as Charles Macum Diggs
- George D. Wallace as Bob Ferris
- Alex Garcia as Minoso Torres
- Benny Urquidez as Referee
- Jeremy Roberts as Sonny Hawkins
- Michael DeLorenzo as Paulo

== Production ==
Filming for Diggstown began on October 11, 1991, and took place in Montana, as well as in Los Angeles and Sacramento, California. Gossett Jr. trained for eight weeks and lost 35 pounds for the role. The film cost $15 million to produce, and MGM spent $17 million promoting it.

== Reception ==
On the review aggregator website Rotten Tomatoes, 63% of 16 critics' reviews are positive, with an average rating of 5.6/10. Audiences polled by CinemaScore gave the film an average grade of "A–" on an A+ to F scale. Leonard Maltin gave the film two and a half stars, calling it "amiable," but complains "the script is contrived". Vincent Canby of The New York Times called it Michael Ritchie's most entertaining film since the mid-1970's, and praising the cast. The Los Angeles Times said the cast livened up "what could have been an overly cute entertainment".

=== Box office ===
The film made $1.5 million from 733 theaters in its opening weekend, finishing in 12th. However, the film made $20 million during its first three weeks on home video.

== See also ==
- List of boxing films
