= Richard Boyle (journalist) =

American journalist

- Born: Richard David Boyle; March 26, 1942; San Francisco, California, U.S.
- Died: September 1, 2016 (aged 74); Philippines
- Occupations: Author, photojournalist, journalist
- Years active: 1965–2016
- Known for: War zone reporter Book; Documentaries
- Children: 1

Richard David Boyle (March 26, 1942 – September 1, 2016) was a journalist, photographer, and author from the United States. He wrote the 1972 book Flower of the Dragon: The Breakdown of the U. S. Army in Vietnam: An Eyewitness Account of the Day-to-Day Environment of American Soldiers in Vietnam. He co-wrote the 1986 movie Salvador with Oliver Stone. He covered the revolution in Cambodia, The Troubles in Ireland, and the Civil War in Lebanon. In the Republic of Vietnam, he documented the resistance of U.S. troops against the Vietnam War.

Salvador was nominated for two Academy Awards: Best Actor in a Leading Role (Woods) and Best Writing, Screenplay Written Directly for the Screen (Stone and Boyle). Boyle was played in Salvador by James Woods, the cast including Jim Belushi, Michael Murphy and John Savage.

Boyle taught journalism in Southern California colleges. He also ran as a gadfly for public office, including for Supervisor and City Treasurer in San Francisco, the latter two runs in 1977, and for the 42nd District of the California State Assembly in 1988. He died in the Philippines while covering the beginning of the rule of President Rodrigo Duterte.

== Publications ==
- Flower of the Dragon: The Breakdown of the U. S. Army in Vietnam—An Eyewitness Account of the Day-to-Day Environment of American Soldiers in Vietnam. San Francisco, Calif.: Ramparts Press (1972). ISBN 0878670203.
- GI Revolts: The Breakdown of the U.S. Army in Vietnam. San Francisco, Calif.: United Front Press (May 1973).
- "The Strange Death of Clay Shaw." True (Apr. 1975), pp. 54–57, 78–79.
