= Ghosts of Mississippi =

1996 film by Rob Reiner

- Theatrical release poster
- Directed by: Rob Reiner
- Written by: Lewis Colick
- Produced by: Nicholas Paleologos; Rob Reiner; Andrew Scheinman; Frederick M. Zollo; Charles Newirth; Jeff Stott
- Starring: Alec Baldwin; Whoopi Goldberg; James Woods; Craig T. Nelson
- Cinematography: John Seale
- Edited by: Robert Leighton
- Music by: Marc Shaiman
- Production companies: Columbia Pictures; Castle Rock Entertainment
- Distributed by: Sony Pictures Releasing
- Release date: December 20, 1996
- Running time: 130 minutes
- Country: United States
- Language: English
- Budget: $36 million
- Box office: $13.3 million

Ghosts of Mississippi is a 1996 American biographical courtroom drama film directed by Rob Reiner and starring Alec Baldwin, Whoopi Goldberg, and James Woods. The film is based on the 1994 trial of Byron De La Beckwith, a white supremacist accused of the 1963 assassination of civil rights activist Medgar Evers. It is the final film for character actor Ramon Bieri.

Released by Sony Pictures Releasing on December 20, 1996, the film received mixed reviews from critics and was a box office disappointment grossing just $13.3 million against its $36 million budget. However, the performances of Goldberg and Woods were widely praised, with the latter earning a nomination for Best Supporting Actor at the 69th Academy Awards, along with a nomination for Best Makeup.

== Plot ==
Medgar Evers, an African-American civil rights activist in Mississippi, was assassinated outside his home on June 12, 1963, by Byron De La Beckwith, a white supremacist. De La Beckwith had been tried twice in the 1960s, with both trials ended in hung juries. Evers' widow, Myrlie Evers, tries to bring De La Beckwith to justice for over 25 years.

In 1989, emboldened by a newspaper article by Jerry Mitchell exposing jury tampering by the Mississippi State Sovereignty Commission in the first two trials, Myrlie Evers believes she has what it would take to bring De La Beckwith to trial again. Although most of the evidence from the old trial has disappeared, Bobby DeLaughter, an assistant District Attorney, decides to help her, regardless of being warned that it might hurt his political aspirations and despite the strain that it has caused in his marriage. DeLaughter forms a team of investigators from his office; however, the investigation suffers many setbacks.

After learning that several key witnesses have died, and that the court transcript of their testimony from the 1960s trials is lost, the team is convinced their effort is futile. The futility seems reinforced when DeLaughter fails at a desperate strategy of convincing two police officers who provided De La Beckwith with an alibi in the 1960s trials to admit they lied under oath. This pessimism fades, however, with two significant discoveries. Learning that authorities often kept evidence from the trials as "souvenirs", DeLaughter discovers the rifle used in the murder among the keepsakes of his deceased father-in-law, the judge presiding over one of the trials. The authenticity of the rifle, tied to its ownership by De La Beckwith, is verified by serial number. This revelation contributes to the breakup of DeLaughter's marriage. Later, an investigator learns of the existence of a witness unknown to the prosecution in the 1960s trials, Delmar Dennis, a former member of the Ku Klux Klan, who agreed to be an undercover informant for the FBI. Dennis testified against the Klan in the Mississippi Burning case, and once mentioned having met De La Beckwith. The investigation searches for Dennis, who lived in hiding since turning state's evidence on the KKK, to see what he knows of the case.

Confirming that Dennis indeed had met De La Beckwith, the team is optimistic they have enough to secure a new indictment. As knowledge becomes public that the district attorney's office has reopened the case, white supremacist elements threaten DeLaughter and his family (DeLaughter having by this time divorced his unsupportive wife and subsequently remarried). DeLaughter commits to Myrlie that he will try De La Beckwith again; though initially skeptical, after seeing DeLaughter's commitment, Myrlie reveals that she has a court-certified transcript of one of the 1960s trials in her possession. DeLaughter had long sought such a transcript to be able to read testimony from deceased witnesses to the jury for the new trial. Though DeLaughter mostly presents the same case as was presented in the 1960s trial, the addition of Dennis and two other witnesses who supported Dennis's testimony strengthens the new case. Detective Lloyd Bennett reads the testimony of his father, Detective LC Bennett, the officer who found the murder weapon while searching the crime scene, to the jury.

In 1994, De La Beckwith is found guilty and sentenced to life imprisonment. The film ends with Myrlie tearfully rejoicing to the assembled crowd at the courthouse that she never gave up in the fight for justice for Medgar.

== Cast ==
- Alec Baldwin as Bobby DeLaughter
- Whoopi Goldberg as Myrlie Evers
- James Woods as Byron De La Beckwith
- Diane Ladd as Caroline Moore, Dixie's mother
- Bonnie Bartlett as Billie DeLaughter, Bobby's mother
- Bill Cobbs as Charles Evers, Medgar's older brother
- William H. Macy as Charlie Crisco
- Virginia Madsen as Dixie DeLaughter, Bobby's first wife
- Michael O'Keefe as Merrida Coxwell
- Susanna Thompson as Peggy Lloyd, Bobby's second wife
- Craig T. Nelson as Ed Peters
- Brock Peters as Walter Williams, Myrlie's second husband
- James Pickens Jr. as Medgar Evers, Myrlie's first husband
- Bill Smitrovich as Jim Kitchens
- Lloyd "Benny" Bennett as Benny Bennett
- Ramon Bieri as James Holley
- Jerry Hardin as Barney DeLaughter, Bobby's father
- Jerry Levine as Jerry Mitchell
- Margo Martindale as Clara Mayfield
- Jim Harley as Delmar Dennis
- Terry O'Quinn as Judge Hilburn
- Andy Romano as Hardy Lott
- Lucas Black as Burt DeLaughter, Bobby & Dixie's first son
- Alexa Vega as Claire DeLaughter, Bobby & Dixie's daughter
- Joseph Tello as Drew DeLaughter, Bobby & Dixie's second son
- Sky Rumph as Jared Lloyd, Peggy's son
- Darrell Evers as Darrell Evers, Myrlie & Medgar's first son
  - G. Ja'ron Henderson as Darrel (age 11)
- Yolanda King as Reena Evers, Myrlie & Medgar's daughter
  - Rae'Ven Larrymore Kelly as Reena (age 10)
- James Van Evers as Van Evers, Myrlie & Medgar's second son
  - Curtis Tyler Haynes as Van (age 3)
- Richard Riehle as Tommy Mayfield, Clara's husband
- Rex Linn as Martin Scott
- Wayne Rogers as Morris Dees
- Early Whitesides as Ross Barnett

== Music ==
The soundtrack of the film, with a score by Marc Shaiman, featured two versions of the Billy Taylor composition "I Wish I Knew How It Would Feel to Be Free" – one sung by Dionne Farris and the other by Nina Simone – as well as numbers by Muddy Waters, Tony Bennett, Robert Johnson and B.B. King.

== Reception ==
Ghosts of Mississippi received mixed reviews from critics, though the performances of Goldberg and Woods were praised. On review aggregator Rotten Tomatoes the film holds an approval rating of 42% based on 31 reviews. The site's critics consensus reads: "James Woods is convincing as a white supremacist, but everything else rings false in Ghosts of Mississippi, which examines a weighty subject from the least interesting perspective." Audiences polled by CinemaScore gave the film an average grade of "A−" on an A+ to F scale.

Gene Siskel and Roger Ebert gave the film two thumbs down on their syndicated television program, with both commenting that the film should have focused more on the story of Medgar Evers instead of Baldwin's character. Ebert's print review in The Chicago Sun-Times was a mixed 2.5 stars out of possible four, writing that Woods gave the most convincing performance, yet adding: "This is a moving story, but it’s not a particularly compelling one", because Ghosts of Mississippi "is really about white redemption" due to its extremely limited focus on African-American characters.

The film was not a financial success, earning less than half of its budget. Later, Alec Baldwin referred to the film as "tepid": "In ’96, I did The Edge and Ghosts of Mississippi. And that’s when you hear the sound of the wheels of the train screeching to a halt. The Edge and Ghosts of Mississippi were my last shots at the arcade, so to speak. Both movies were out in ’97. They bombed.” In contrast, director Rob Reiner defended the film in a 1997 interview with Larry King, stating, "It may be the best film I've ever done." He also disagreed with the film's critical reception, arguing that critics had judged it for what they wanted it to be rather than what it was. Reiner maintained that a film's lasting value could only be properly assessed years after its release.

=== Accolades ===
Award	Category	Nominee(s)	Result	Ref.
Academy Awards	Best Supporting Actor	James Woods	Nominated	
Academy Awards	Best Makeup	Matthew W. Mungle and Deborah La Mia Denaver	Nominated	
Chicago Film Critics Association Awards	Best Supporting Actor	James Woods	Nominated	
Critics Choice Awards	Best Supporting Actor	James Woods	Nominated	
Golden Globe Awards	Best Supporting Actor – Motion Picture	James Woods	Nominated	
Heartland Film Festival	Truly Moving Picture	Rob Reiner	Won	
NAACP Image Awards	Outstanding Actress in a Motion Picture	Whoopi Goldberg	Nominated	
Online Film & Television Association Awards	Best Supporting Actor	James Woods	Nominated	
Political Film Society Awards	Human Rights		Won	
Southeastern Film Critics Association Awards	Best Supporting Actor	James Woods	Runner-up	

== See also ==
- Civil rights movement in popular culture
- Culture of Mississippi
