= Dirty Pictures =

2000 TV film directed by Frank Pierson

- DVD cover
- Genre: Docudrama
- Written by: Ilene Chaiken
- Directed by: Frank Pierson
- Starring: James Woods; Craig T. Nelson; Diana Scarwid
- Music by: Mark Snow
- Country of origin: United States
- Original language: English

Production
- Producer: Michael Manheim
- Cinematography: Hiro Narita
- Editor: Peter Zinner
- Running time: 104 minutes
- Production companies: The Manheim Company; MGM Television

Original release
- Network: Showtime
- Release: May 20, 2000

Dirty Pictures is a 2000 American docudrama television film directed by Frank Pierson, written by Ilene Chaiken, and starring James Woods, Craig T. Nelson, and Diana Scarwid. The film focuses on the 1990 trial of Cincinnati Contemporary Arts Center director Dennis Barrie (Woods), who was accused of promoting pornography by presenting an exhibit of photographs by Robert Mapplethorpe that included images of naked children and graphic displays of homosexual sadomasochism.

The film premiered on Showtime on May 20, 2000. It later was released on both videotape and DVD.

== Plot synopsis ==
Dennis Barrie books a potentially controversial exhibit of Robert Mapplethorpe's nude photography for the Contemporary Arts Center and, with the support of his board of directors, opts to keep it on the schedule even after the prestigious Corcoran Gallery of Art in Washington, D.C., removes it from theirs.

Even before the exhibit opens, controversy about its content arises and is fueled by the local media, and after it does, Barrie is indicted and put on trial on pandering and obscenity charges, and he and his family become the center of the highly charged case. As time passes, they become the targets of ongoing harassment and ridicule, are ostracized by their friends, offered a substantial bribe by the shady spokesman for a right-wing organization, and bullied by Monty Lobb, leader of the conservative group People for Community Values, but also find themselves receiving a great deal of support from not only the art community at large, but local citizens as well. As his marriage begins to disintegrate and the prospect of a jail sentence looms before him, he finds himself torn between his devotion to his family and his determination to defend the doctrines of the First Amendment.

Barrie ultimately is found not guilty. Via an epilogue we learn his marriage eventually ended in divorce and, despite his legal victory, his experience and the wide publicity it received consequently impacted on other museum curators and boards who opted to avoid presenting potentially controversial exhibits in their venues for fear of a similar backlash.

Throughout the film, scripted scenes intermingle with archival interviews with George H. W. Bush, Jesse Helms, Patrick Buchanan, Barney Frank, William Buckley, Susan Sarandon, and Salman Rushdie.

== Principal cast ==
- James Woods – Dennis Barrie
- Craig T. Nelson – Sheriff Simon Leis
- Diana Scarwid – Dianne Barrie
- Leon Pownall – District Attorney Prouty
- Matt North – Monty Lobb
- David Huband – Sirkin
- Judah Katz – Mizibov
- Rachael Crawford – Bosworth
- Marnie McPhail – Reising
- R.D. Reid – Albanese
- Allegra Fulton – Angela
- Michele Muzzi – Brenda
- Martin Roach – Ed
- Tony De Santis – Floyd
- Kenneth McGregor – Gil
- Jeff Pustil – Harry
- Sally Cahill – Liz
- Linda Goranson – Mary
- Geoffrey Bowes -Suit
- John Evans – Tucker
- Jonathan Whittaker – Muntz
- Colin Fox – Walsh
- Michael Seater – Ian
- Stephen Joffe – Kevin Barrie
- Nicky Guadagni – Kardon
- Nancy Beatty – Reisman
- Lawrence Bayne – Stein
- Dave Nichols – Johnson
- Michael Dyson – Bailiff
- Frank Moore – Ruberg

== Production notes ==
Many of the actual Mapplethorpe photographs displayed in the exhibit, including some of the more controversial ones, are seen in the film. A warning at its start advises viewers of the film's content and explains the necessity of displaying the images to allow both an understanding of the graphic nature of the handful of provocative pictures that prompted Barrie's arrest and an appreciation for the overall beauty of the photographer's portraitures and depictions of nature.

The film was shot in Toronto, with Old City Hall used as the setting for the courtroom scenes.

== Critical reception ==
In his review in the San Francisco Chronicle, John Carman said the film "labors to apply a semigloss coat of dramatic entertainment to a thorny social issue . . . But the best efforts of veteran director Frank Pierson and screenwriter Ilene Chaiken can't turn the trick . . . We may not know much about art, or First Amendment niceties, but who can't relate to a family in turmoil? Problem is, there's a de rigueur movie feel to it. Real or not, these story points pull our chain too obviously. The movie is drier but more rewarding when it sticks to the point."

In Time, James Poniewozik described the film as a "mechanical, insultingly didactic placard . . . that wants to be an agitprop documentary, interrupting its storyline with interviews of mostly pro-Mapplethorpe notables. The film isn't obligated to be neutral, but it's so bullying and one-sided that a viewer feels guilty for agreeing with it. Defending an artist who preferred aesthetics to righteousness, Dirty Pictures sadly advances exactly the opposite."

Ken Tucker of Entertainment Weekly called the film "titillatingly titled but artistically timid" and added, "Chaiken and Pierson drain Dirty Pictures of engaging drama by denying the opposition any believability; they present Barrie's persecutors as hostile idiots and hopeless prudes . . . The director further hobbles the movie's pace by interrupting the narrative with commentator interviews . . . [which], while occasionally eloquent, are also entirely predictable . . . Will viewers come away with renewed respect for Mapplethorpe's artistic intentions? Maybe. But they might also feel the way the jury does here: condescended to, as if we aren't capable of grappling with disturbing images without an art expert guiding us through them like a therapist."

Channel 4 describes it as "flawed but still engaging . . . more notable for what it says than the way it actually says it . . . it's a thought-provoking trip driven by the reliably charismatic Woods. While the issues themselves get a thorough airing however, other aspects are less satisfying. Supporting characters are underwritten, odd legal issues are over-emphasised and the domestic scenes scream 'made-for-TV'. In purely dramatic terms the most powerful moment comes right at the end and the stark conclusion goes a long way to redeeming the film's inadequacies, even if the events that inspired it are profoundly depressing."

Time Out London says, "Coming over at times like a radical left-field essay film . . . [it] lifts off from its factual origins to deliver a major plea for tolerance and minority understanding, and against political censorship in culture generally."

== Awards and nominations ==
- Golden Globe Award for Best Mini-Series Or Motion Picture Made for Television (winner)
- Golden Globe Award for Best Performance by an Actor in a Mini-Series or Motion Picture Made for Television (James Woods, nominee)
- Emmy Award for Outstanding Cinematography for a Miniseries, Movie or a Special (nominee)
- Emmy Award for Outstanding Sound Mixing for a Miniseries or a Movie (nominee)
- Satellite Award for Best Actor - Miniseries or TV Film (Woods, winner)
- Satellite Award for Best TV Film (nominee)
- Screen Actors Guild Award for Outstanding Performance by a Male Actor in a Miniseries or Television Movie (Woods, nominee)
- American Cinema Editors Eddie Award for Best Edited Motion Picture for Non-Commercial Television (winner)
- Monte Carlo TV Festival Golden Nymph Award for Best Film (winner)
