= Promise (1986 film) =

- DVD cover
- Genre: Drama
- Screenplay by: Richard Friedenberg
- Story by: Kenneth Blackwell; Tennyson Flowers; Richard Friedenberg
- Directed by: Glenn Jordan
- Starring: James Garner; James Woods; Piper Laurie
- Music by: David Shire
- Country of origin: United States
- Original language: English

Production
- Executive producers: Peter K. Duchow; James Garner
- Producer: Glenn Jordan
- Cinematography: Gayne Rescher
- Editor: Paul Rubell
- Running time: 97 minutes
- Production companies: Hallmark Hall of Fame Productions; Garner-Duchow Productions; Warner Bros. Television

Original release
- Network: CBS
- Release: December 14, 1986

Promise is a 1986 American drama television film directed by Glenn Jordan and written by Richard Friedenberg, from a story by Kenneth Blackwell, Tennyson Flowers and Friedenberg. James Garner stars as a care-free man who returns to his hometown after his mother's death, and has to assume responsibility for his mentally ill younger brother (James Woods). The film aired on CBS on December 14, 1986, as a Hallmark Hall of Fame presentation. One of the most honored films in television history, Promise received the Peabody Award, Humanitas Prize, Christopher Award, and Golden Globe Award. Its record of five Primetime Emmy Awards was not matched until 2010, by the film Temple Grandin.

== Plot ==
When his mother dies, estranged son Bob inherits her estate, and, surprisingly, custody of his younger brother D.J., who has schizophrenia. Bob is initially reluctant at his new responsibility, but remembers that he had promised his mother to look after his brother.

== Cast ==
The cast and credits of Promise are recorded at WorldCat.

- James Garner as Bob Beuhler
- James Woods as D.J.
- Piper Laurie as Annie Gilbert
- Peter Michael Goetz as Stuart
- Michael Alldredge as Gibb
- Alan Rosenberg as Dr. Pressman
- Mary Marsh as Mrs. Post
- Barbara Niven as Joan (credited as Barbara Lee Alexander)
- Steven M. Gagnon as Michael
- Raissa Fleming as Lonnie
- Art Burke as Dr. Wexler
- Bob Griggs as Minister
- Janet Baumhover as Mrs. Green
- Charles W. Bernard as Mr. Allison
- Claretta Mariana as Beth
- Virginia Settle as Mrs. Burden
- Diana Van Arnam as Netta

== Production ==
Promise was first broadcast December 14, 1986, as part of the Hallmark Hall of Fame television anthology series. Directed by Glenn Jordan from a screenplay by Richard Friedenberg, the film was shot September–October 1986 on location in Oregon, in Corvallis, Salem and Dallas, and at Triangle Lake.

"It was an easy decision for me and my producing partner, Peter Duchow, to join forces with Hallmark," James Garner wrote in his 2011 autobiography, The Garner Files. He felt he would not have been able to play the role of Bob Beuhler five years earlier, since he felt it was unsympathetic. "Not that Bob is a villain, he just never grew up," Garner wrote. James Woods was cast as his younger brother, D.J.; Garner remembered him from the first episode of The Rockford Files.

Woods has said, "People ask me, 'What's the favorite thing you've ever done in your life?' and I always say Promise because it was a perfect part for me and a perfect experience with Jim." He researched his role at a halfway house in Santa Monica, California, where he met a young man whose eloquent description of living with schizophrenia was put into the script:

It's like, all the electric wires in the house are plugged into my brain. And every one has a different noise, so I can't think. Some of the wires have voices in them and they tell me things like what to do and that people are watching me. I know there really aren't any voices, but I feel that there are, and that I should listen to them or something will happen. … I can remember what I was like before. I was a class officer, I had friends. I was going to be an aeronautical engineer. Do you remember, Bobby? I've never had a job. I've never owned a car. I've never lived alone. I've never made love to a woman. And I never will. That's what it's like. You should know. That's why I'm a Hindu. Because maybe it's true: Maybe people are born again. And if there is a God, maybe he'll give me another chance. I believe that, because this can't be all I get.

"Accepting the Emmy for Best Teleplay, Richard Friedenberg said he hoped the film would help schizophrenics by calling attention to their plight," Garner wrote. "I'm sorry to say that 25 years later, schizophrenia is the worst mental health problem facing the nation."

== Awards and nominations ==
Year	Award	Category	Nominee(s)	Result	Ref.
1986	Peabody Awards	—N/a	CBS Entertainment and Garner-Duchow Productions	Won	
1987	Christopher Awards	Television and Cable		Won	
1987	Golden Globe Awards	Best Miniseries or Motion Picture Made for Television		Won	
1987	Golden Globe Awards	Best Actor in a Miniseries or Motion Picture Made for Television	James Garner	Nominated	
1987	Golden Globe Awards	Best Actor in a Miniseries or Motion Picture Made for Television	James Woods	Won	
1987	Golden Globe Awards	Best Supporting Actress in a Series, Miniseries or Motion Picture Made for Television	Piper Laurie	Nominated	
1987	Primetime Emmy Awards	Outstanding Drama/Comedy Special	Peter K. Duchow, James Garner, Glenn Jordan, and Richard Friedenberg	Won	
1987	Primetime Emmy Awards	Outstanding Lead Actor in a Miniseries or a Special	James Garner	Nominated	
1987	Primetime Emmy Awards	Outstanding Lead Actor in a Miniseries or a Special	James Woods	Won	
1987	Primetime Emmy Awards	Outstanding Supporting Actress in a Miniseries or a Special	Piper Laurie	Won	
1987	Primetime Emmy Awards	Outstanding Directing in a Miniseries or a Special	Glenn Jordan	Won	
1987	Primetime Emmy Awards	Outstanding Writing in a Miniseries or a Special	Ken Blackwell, Tennyson Flowers, and Richard Friedenberg	Won	
1987	Primetime Emmy Awards	Outstanding Cinematography for a Miniseries or a Special	Gayne Rescher	Nominated	
1987	Television Critics Association Awards	Program of the Year		Nominated	
1988	American Society of Cinematographers Awards	Outstanding Achievement in Cinematography in Mini-Series or Specials	Gayne Rescher	Nominated	
1988	Humanitas Prize	90 Minute or Longer Network or Syndicated Television	Richard Friedenberg	Won	

== Home media ==
- 2009: Hallmark Hall of Fame, Gold Crown Collector's Edition (DVD), 2009. Special features include a featurette on the making of the film, interviews, cast biographies and credits. Close captioned.
- 2012: Warner Archive (DVD-R, created on demand), August 28, 2012.
