= Salvador (1986 film) =

1986 war drama film directed by Oliver Stone

- Theatrical release poster
- Directed by: Oliver Stone
- Written by: Oliver Stone; Richard Boyle
- Produced by: Oliver Stone; Gerald Green
- Starring: James Woods; Jim Belushi; Michael Murphy; John Savage; Elpidia Carrillo; Cindy Gibb
- Cinematography: Robert Richardson
- Edited by: Claire Simpson
- Music by: Georges Delerue
- Production companies: Hemdale Film; Cinema '84; Estudios Churubusco Azteca; Patsa Productions S.A.
- Distributed by: Hemdale Releasing Corporation
- Release date: March 5, 1986
- Running time: 123 minutes
- Countries: United Kingdom; Mexico; United States
- Languages: English; Spanish
- Budget: $4.5 million
- Box office: $1.5 million (US)

Salvador is a 1986 war drama film co-written and directed by Oliver Stone. It stars James Woods as Richard Boyle, alongside Jim Belushi, Michael Murphy and Elpidia Carrillo, with John Savage and Cynthia Gibb in supporting roles. Stone co-wrote the screenplay with Boyle.

The film tells the story of an American journalist covering the Salvadoran Civil War who becomes entangled with both the FMLN and the right-wing military dictatorship while trying to rescue his girlfriend and her children. The film is highly sympathetic toward the left-wing revolutionaries and strongly critical of the US-supported military dictatorship, focusing on the murder of four American Catholic missionaries, including Jean Donovan, and the assassination of Archbishop Óscar Romero by death squads. The film was nominated for two Academy Awards: Best Actor in a Leading Role (Woods) and Best Writing, Screenplay Written Directly for the Screen (Stone and Boyle).

== Plot ==
Veteran photojournalist Richard Boyle, whose career has been derailed by substance abuse and arrogance, finds himself broke and abandoned by his wife. Desperate for work, he convinces his friend Doctor Rock, an unemployed disc jockey, to join him on a trip to El Salvador, where he hopes to cover the country’s civil war as a freelancer. Upon arrival, they witness the violent suppression of student protests and are briefly detained by the military, only spared after Boyle invokes an old connection to right-wing Colonel Figueroa. They learn that the far-right ARENA party, backed by the United States, now controls the country.

Boyle reconnects with his photojournalist partner John Cassady, as well as his old friend, Catholic aid worker Cathy Moore. He begins documenting the regime’s atrocities, including mass graves and disappearances. He also reunites with his former lover María, and they rekindle their relationship, while Rock befriends María's fifteen-year-old brother, Carlos.

After Carlos loudly makes fun of Major Max, an ARENA leader at a restaurant, he is abducted by local authorities. Boyle’s appeals to the American embassy to intervene are rejected, and he and María personally witness the assassination of Archbishop Romero during mass. Shortly after, Carlos is found murdered. As government forces crack down even harder, Cathy and three American nuns are raped and executed by soldiers. That atrocity shocks the U.S. ambassador, who vows to finally withdraw support for ARENA, although he is ultimately prevented from doing it.

As rebels overrun the government forces in Santa Ana, Boyle witnesses them execute captured soldiers with the same cruelty the military had previously shown them, which greatly disgusts him. The Salvadoran Army starts using American supplies to combat the rebels and Boyle's friend and fellow photojournalist, Cassady, is killed in the crossfire. Boyle, Rock, María, and her two young children attempt to flee the country using forged papers, but are caught. Just as Boyle is about to be executed, a last-minute call from the ambassador spares his life.

Boyle, María and her children finally arrive in the United States. Happy and relieved, they board a bus and discuss their future. However, the bus is suddenly pulled over on a California highway. Immigration officials board and forcibly remove María and her children for illegally entering the country. An angry Boyle tries to intervene, yelling that María and the children will be killed if they are returned to El Salvador. The officials physically restrain Boyle and, as he is being arrested for his resistance, he watches in silent despair as María and the children are driven away. The closing cards reveal that Maria and her family are now believed to be in a refugee camp in Guatemala, while the US continues to support the regime in El Salvador.

== Cast ==
- James Woods as Richard Boyle
- Jim Belushi as Dr. Rock (based on Eric 'Dr. Rock' Isralow)
- Michael Murphy as Ambassador Thomas Kelly (based on Robert E. White)
- John Savage as John Cassady (based on John Hoagland)
- Elpidia Carrillo as María
- Cindy Gibb as Cathy Moore (based on Jean Donovan)
- Tony Plana as Major Maximiliano Casanova (based on Roberto D'Aubuisson)
- José Carlos Ruiz as Archbishop Oscar Romero

== Production ==
After the commercial failure of his earlier films Seizure and The Hand, and with a newborn son, Oliver Stone was seeking a new project when he chanced upon the unpublished war reporting of his visiting friend journalist Richard Boyle, whom he saw as a kindred spirit. Their collaboration led to Salvador, which was also shaped by Stone’s own Vietnam War experience and anti-war sentiments.

The film exaggerated the real personalities of Boyle and his companion Doctor Rock for dramatic effect. While the characters are depicted as vulgar and dysfunctional, the real Boyle was a professor and author who battled addiction, and Doctor Rock (Eric Isralow) was a San Francisco DJ and marijuana advocate. Isralow later sued Stone and Hemdale for breach of contract, claiming he was promised a role and that his DJ name “Dr. Rock” was used without permission. The case's outcome remains unknown.

Due to safety and security concerns, Salvador was actually filmed in Mexico. In March 1985, the film's consultant, Salvadoran Army spokesman Lt. Col. Ricardo Cienfuegos, was assassinated on a tennis court by the communist rebels. In his production notes, Stone wrote that he believed the killing signaled that El Salvador was entering into "a new period... when the hardline Marxist element decided to engage in urban terrorism." The finished film is dedicated to "Dad 1910-1985" (Stone's father, stockbroker Louis Stone) who died while the film was in pre-production.

== Release ==
The film was released in the United States on March 5, 1986. In the Philippines, the film was released by Pioneer Films as Guns, Goons, Gold on March 26, 1992.

=== Box office ===
The film was not successful at the box office, grossing a total of $1,500,000 in the United States.

=== Critical response ===
As of August 2026, Salvador holds a rating of 91% on Rotten Tomatoes based on 32 reviews with an average score of 7.7/10 and the consensus: "Despite its somewhat disjointed narrative, Oliver Stone's Salvador is a vivid and powerful political drama that sets an early tone for the director's similarly provocative future projects." Metacritic, which uses a weighted average, assigned the film a score of 69 out of 100, based on 17 critics, indicating "generally favorable" reviews.

Salvador was popular among critics. Roger Ebert, a film critic for the Chicago Sun-Times, gave the movie three stars out of four, and wrote: "The movie has an undercurrent of seriousness, and it is not happy about the chaos that we are helping to subsidize. But basically it's a character study — a portrait of a couple of burned-out free-lancers trying to keep their heads above water."

Walter Goodman of The New York Times wrote an unfavorable review, arguing that while "as an adventure film, [it] has plenty of speed, grit and grime", it depicts "improbable people doing implausible things" and in some cases deviates from reality "for the sake of heightening the drama and hammering in the political point". He also compared it to the work of Constantin Costa-Gavras, cinematically as well as politically.

Alex von Tunzelmann in The Guardian criticized the film's cartoonish characters and the mix of facts and fiction; for example, Boyle did not try to enter the US with Maria, and no real reporter existed like Cassady whose photos Boyle published.

=== Accolades ===
The film garnered two Academy Award nominations for Best Actor in a Leading Role (James Woods) and Best Writing, Screenplay Written Directly for the Screen at the 59th Academy Awards ceremony.

== Home media ==
The Region 1 special edition DVD was released on 5 June 2001, and includes the following bonus features:

- Commentary by director Oliver Stone
- 62-minute documentary "Into the Valley of Death"
- Eight deleted scenes
- 46 production photos
- Original theatrical trailer

== See also ==
- Under Fire – 1983 film by Roger Spottiswoode
