= List of biographical films of the 1970s =

The following is a list of biographical films released of the 1970s.

== 1970 ==
Film	Subject(s)	Lead actor or actress
A Bullet for Pretty Boy	Pretty Boy Floyd	Fabian
Chisum	John Chisum	John Wayne
Cromwell	Oliver Cromwell	Richard Harris
The Cross and the Switchblade	David Wilkerson	Pat Boone
The Honeymoon Killers	Martha Beck	Shirley Stoler
The Honeymoon Killers	Raymond Fernandez	Tony Lo Bianco
Julius Caesar	Julius Caesar	Charlton Heston
Michael the Brave	Michael the Brave	Amza Pellea
Ned Kelly	Ned Kelly	Mick Jagger
Patton	George S. Patton	George C. Scott
Song of Norway	Edvard Grieg	Toralv Maurstad
Song of Norway	Rikard Nordraak	Frank Porretta
Szerelmi álmok – Liszt	Franz Liszt	Imre Sinkovits
Tropic of Cancer	Henry Miller	Rip Torn
The Wild Child	Victor of Aveyron	Jean-Pierre Cargol

== 1971 ==
Film	Subject(s)	Lead actor or actress
Brian's Song	Brian Piccolo	James Caan
The Devils	Urbain Grandier	Oliver Reed
Doc	Doc Holliday	Stacy Keach
Evel Knievel	Evel Knievel	George Hamilton
Macbeth	Macbeth of Scotland	Jon Finch
Mary, Queen of Scots	Mary, Queen of Scots	Vanessa Redgrave
Mary, Queen of Scots	Elizabeth I of England	Glenda Jackson
The Music Lovers	Pyotr Tchaikovsky	Richard Chamberlain
Nicholas and Alexandra	Tsar Nicholas II	Michael Jayston
Nicholas and Alexandra	Tsaritsa Alexandra of Russia	Janet Suzman
Rain for a Dusty Summer	Miguel Pro	Humberto Almazán
10 Rillington Place	John Reginald Christie	Richard Attenborough

== 1972 ==
Film	Subject(s)	Lead actor or actress
Adolf Hitler: My Part in His Downfall	Spike Milligan	Jim Dale
The Assassination of Trotsky	Leon Trotsky	Richard Burton
Aguirre, the Wrath of God	Lope de Aguirre	Klaus Kinski
Antony and Cleopatra	Mark Antony	Charlton Heston
Antony and Cleopatra	Cleopatra VII	Hildegarde Neil
Brother Sun, Sister Moon	St. Francis of Assisi	Graham Faulkner
Brother Sun, Sister Moon	St. Clare of Assisi	Judi Bowker
Dirty Little Billy	Billy the Kid	Michael J. Pollard
The Great Waltz	Johann Strauss II	Horst Buchholz
Henry VIII and His Six Wives	Henry VIII	Keith Michell
Henry VIII and His Six Wives	Anne Boleyn	Charlotte Rampling
Lady Caroline Lamb	Lady Caroline Lamb	Sarah Miles
Lady Sings the Blues	Billie Holiday	Diana Ross
The Life and Times of Judge Roy Bean	Judge Roy Bean	Paul Newman
The Life of Leonardo da Vinci	Leonardo da Vinci	Philippe Leroy
Living Free	George Adamson	Nigel Davenport
Living Free	Joy Adamson	Susan Hampshire
Ludwig	Ludwig II of Bavaria	Helmut Berger
Ludwig - Requiem for a Virgin King	Ludwig II of Bavaria	Harry Baer
The Mattei Affair	Enrico Mattei	Gian Maria Volonté
Pancho Villa	Pancho Villa	Telly Savalas
Pope Joan	Pope Joan	Liv Ullmann
Savage Messiah	Henri Gaudier-Brzeska	Scott Antony
Tadas Blinda	Tadas Blinda	Vytautas Tomkus
The Valachi Papers	Joseph Valachi	Charles Bronson
Young Winston	Winston Churchill	Simon Ward

== 1973 ==
Film	Subject(s)	Lead actor or actress
Dillinger	John Dillinger	Warren Oates
Giordano Bruno	Giuliano Montaldo	Gian Maria Volonté
Edvard Munch	Edvard Munch	Geir Westby
Hitler: The Last Ten Days	Adolf Hitler	Alec Guinness
Jesus Christ Superstar	Jesus	Ted Neeley
The Last American Hero	Junior Johnson	Jeff Bridges
Lucky Luciano	Lucky Luciano	Gian Maria Volonté
Maurie	Maurice Stokes	Bernie Casey
Maurie	Jack Twyman	Bo Svenson
Papillon	Henri Charrière	Steve McQueen
Papillon	Louis Dega	Dustin Hoffman
Pat Garrett and Billy the Kid	Pat Garrett	James Coburn
Pat Garrett and Billy the Kid	Billy the Kid	Kris Kristofferson
Serpico	Frank Serpico	Al Pacino
Walking Tall	Buford Pusser	Joe Don Baker

== 1974 ==
Film	Subject(s)	Lead actor or actress
The Abdication	Queen Christina of Sweden	Liv Ullmann
Conrack	Pat Conroy	Jon Voight
The Education of Sonny Carson	Robert "Sonny" Carson	Rony Clanton
The Enigma of Kaspar Hauser	Kaspar Hauser	Bruno S.
Karl May	Karl May	Helmut Käutner
The Great McGonagall	William McGonagall	Spike Milligan
Lenny	Lenny Bruce	Dustin Hoffman
Mahler	Gustav Mahler	Robert Powell
Mahler	Alma Mahler	Georgina Hale
Stavisky	Alexandre Stavisky	Jean-Paul Belmondo
The Story of Jacob and Joseph	Jacob	Keith Michell
The Story of Jacob and Joseph	Joseph	Tony Lo Bianco
Visit to a Chief's Son	Kevin Gorman	John Philip Hogdon

== 1975 ==
Film	Subject(s)	Lead actor or actress
Babe	Babe Didrickson	Susan Clark
Capone	Al Capone	Ben Gazzara
Dog Day Afternoon	Sonny Wortzik	Al Pacino
Galileo	Galileo Galilei	Chaim Topol
The Happy Hooker	Xaviera Hollander	Lynn Redgrave
The Hiding Place	Corrie ten Boom	Julie Harris
Lepke	Louis Buchalter	Tony Curtis
Lisztomania	Franz Liszt	Roger Daltrey
Moses the Lawgiver	Moses	Burt Lancaster
Murph the Surf	Jack Roland Murphy	Don Stroud
The Naked Civil Servant	Quentin Crisp	John Hurt
The Other Side of the Mountain	Jill Kinmont	Marilyn Hassett
The Story of Adele H.	Adèle Hugo	Isabelle Adjani
Un prete scomodo	Lorenzo Milani	Enrico Maria Salerno

== 1976 ==
Film	Subject(s)	Lead actor or actress
Amelia Earhart	Amelia Earhart	Susan Clark
Bound for Glory	Woody Guthrie	David Carradine
Bruce Lee and I	Bruce Lee	Danny Lee
Bruce Lee and I	Betty Ting Pei	Betty Ting Pei
Bruce Lee: The Man, The Myth	Bruce Lee	Bruce Li
Buffalo Bill and the Indians	Buffalo Bill	Paul Newman
The Disappearance of Aimee	Aimee Semple McPherson	Faye Dunaway
Eleanor and Franklin	Franklin D. Roosevelt	Edward Herrmann
Eleanor and Franklin	Eleanor Roosevelt	Jane Alexander
Fellini's Casanova	Giacomo Casanova	Donald Sutherland
Gable and Lombard	Clark Gable	James Brolin
Gable and Lombard	Carole Lombard	Jill Clayburgh
Helter Skelter	Vincent Bugliosi	George DiCenzo
Helter Skelter	Charles Manson	Steve Railsback
James Dean	James Dean	Stephen McHattie
The Last of Mrs. Lincoln	Mary Todd Lincoln	Julie Harris
Mad Dog Morgan	Dan Morgan	Dennis Hopper
The Message	Muhammad	Anthony Quinn
The Story of David	King David	Timothy Bottoms
Sybil	Shirley Ardell Mason	Sally Field
W.C. Fields and Me	W. C. Fields	Rod Steiger

== 1977 ==
Film	Subject(s)	Lead actor or actress
Chanakya Chandragupta	Chanakya	Akkineni Nageswara Rao
Chanakya Chandragupta	Chandragupta	N. T. Rama Rao
The Amazing Howard Hughes	Howard Hughes	Tommy Lee Jones
Greased Lightning	Wendell Scott	Richard Pryor
The Greatest	Muhammad Ali	Muhammad Ali
MacArthur	Douglas MacArthur	Gregory Peck
Looking for Mr. Goodbar	Roseann Quinn	Diane Keaton
The Private Files of J. Edgar Hoover	J. Edgar Hoover	Broderick Crawford
The Trial of Ned Kelly	Ned Kelly	John Waters
Rembrandt fecit 1669	Rembrandt	Frans Stelling as (Rembrandt young)
Rembrandt fecit 1669	Rembrandt	Ton de Koff as (Rembrandt old)
Scott Joplin	Scott Joplin	Billy Dee Williams
Valentino	Rudolph Valentino	Rudolf Nureyev
Wilma	Wilma Rudolph	Shirley Jo Finney

== 1978 ==
Film	Subject(s)	Lead actor or actress
American Hot Wax	Alan Freed	Tim McIntire
Bud and Lou	Bud Abbott	Harvey Korman
Bud and Lou	Lou Costello	Buddy Hackett
The Buddy Holly Story	Buddy Holly	Gary Busey
Deadman's Curve	Jan Berry	Richard Hatch
Deadman's Curve	Dean Torrence	Bruce Davison
Diary of Korean-Japanese War	Yi Sun-sin	Kim Jin-kyu
Ishi: The Last of His Tribe	Ishi	Eloy Casados
La Vida y Poesia de Julia de Burgos	Julia de Burgos	Ana Li Diaz
King	Dr. Martin Luther King Jr.	Paul Winfield
The Lost Boys	J. M. Barrie	Ian Holm
Midnight Express	Billy Hayes	Brad Davis
Pretty Baby	Ernest J. Bellocq	Keith Carradine
Veera Puran Appu	Puran Appu	Ravindra Randeniya
Veera Puran Appu	Gongalegoda Banda	Joe Abeywickrama
The Defection of Simas Kudirka	Simas Kudirka	Alan Arkin
The Roads of Exile	Jean-Jacques Rousseau	François Simon

== 1979 ==
Film	Subject(s)	Lead actor or actress
Backstairs at the White House	Maggie Rogers	Olivia Cole
Backstairs at the White House	Lillian Rogers Parks	Leslie Uggams
Birth of The Beatles	John Lennon	Stephen MacKenna
Birth of The Beatles	Paul McCartney	Rod Culbertson
Birth of The Beatles	George Harrison	John Altman
Birth of The Beatles	Ringo Starr	Ray Ashcroft
A Glass Of Water	Abigail Masham, Baroness Masham	Svetlana Smirnova
The Bronte Sisters	Charlotte Brontë	Isabelle Adjani
The Bronte Sisters	Emily Brontë	Marie-France Pisier
The Bronte Sisters	Anne Brontë	Isabelle Huppert
Caligula	Gaius Germanicus Caligula	Malcolm McDowell
Elvis	Elvis Presley	Kurt Russell
Escape from Alcatraz	Frank Morris	Clint Eastwood
Jesus	Jesus	Brian Deacon
Les Égouts du paradis	Albert Spaggiari	Francis Huster
The Great Riviera Bank Robbery	Albert Spaggiari	Ian McShane
Meetings with Remarkable Men	George Gurdjieff	Dragan Maksimovic
The Onion Field	Karl Francis Hettinger	John Savage
The Onion Field	Gregory Powell	James Woods
The Onion Field	Jimmy Lee Smith	Franklyn Seales
Vlad Tepes	Vlad the Impaler	Stefan Sileanu

== See also ==
- Lists of biographical films
