= Special Service Unit =

American prison division in California

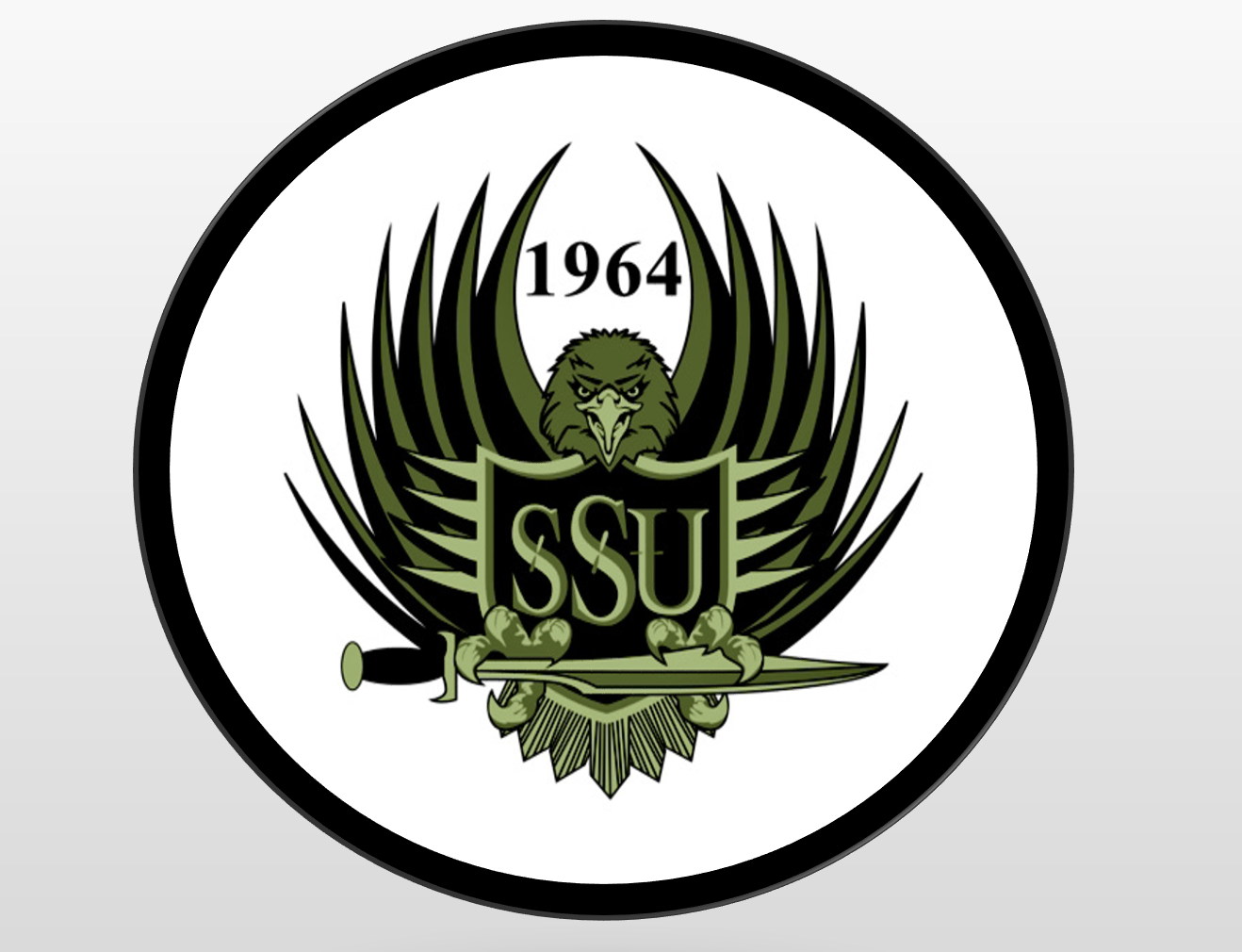
The original SSU logo from 1964.

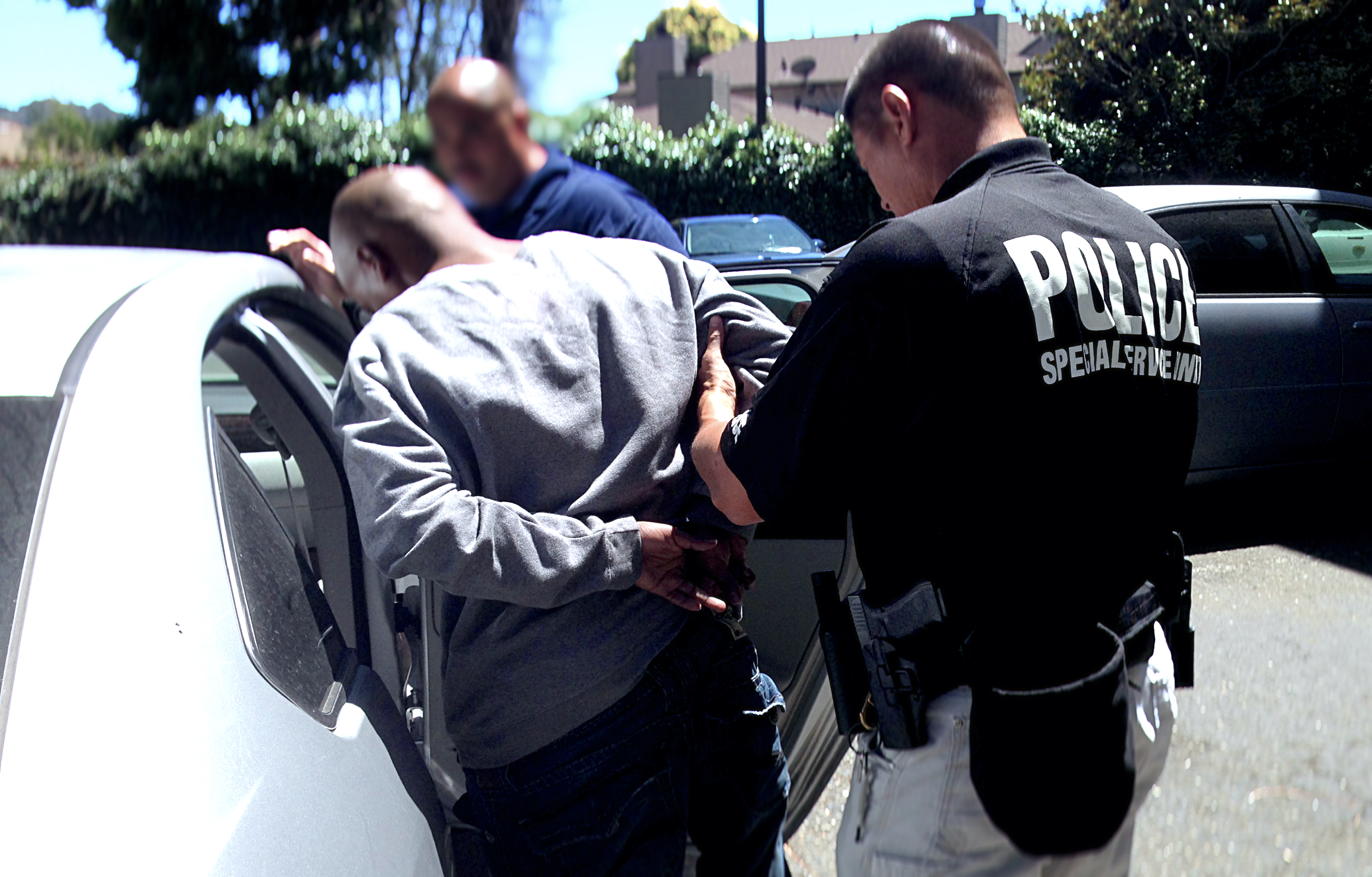
Agents arresting a suspect in San Jose, California

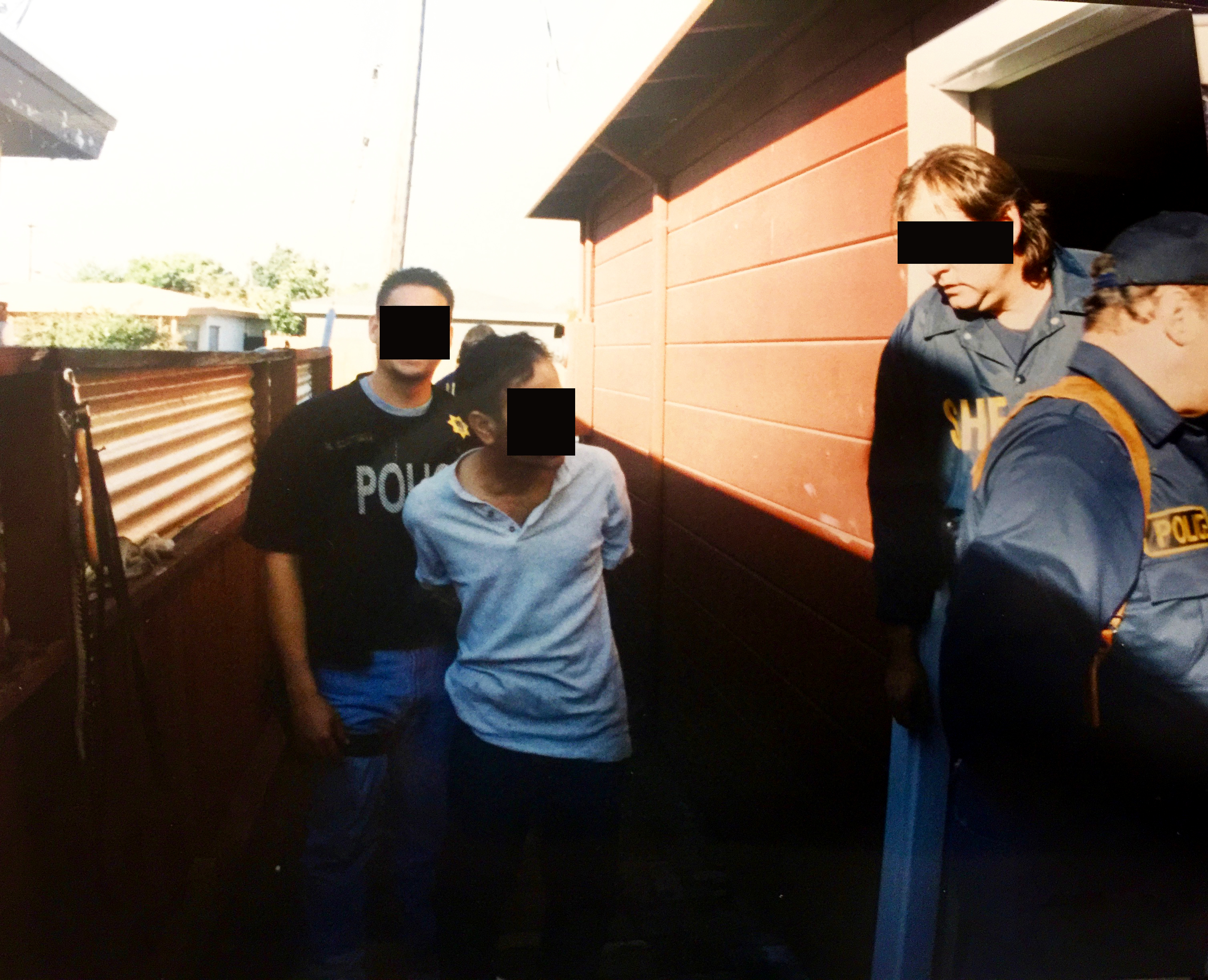
SSU arresting Mexican Mafia member circa 1995

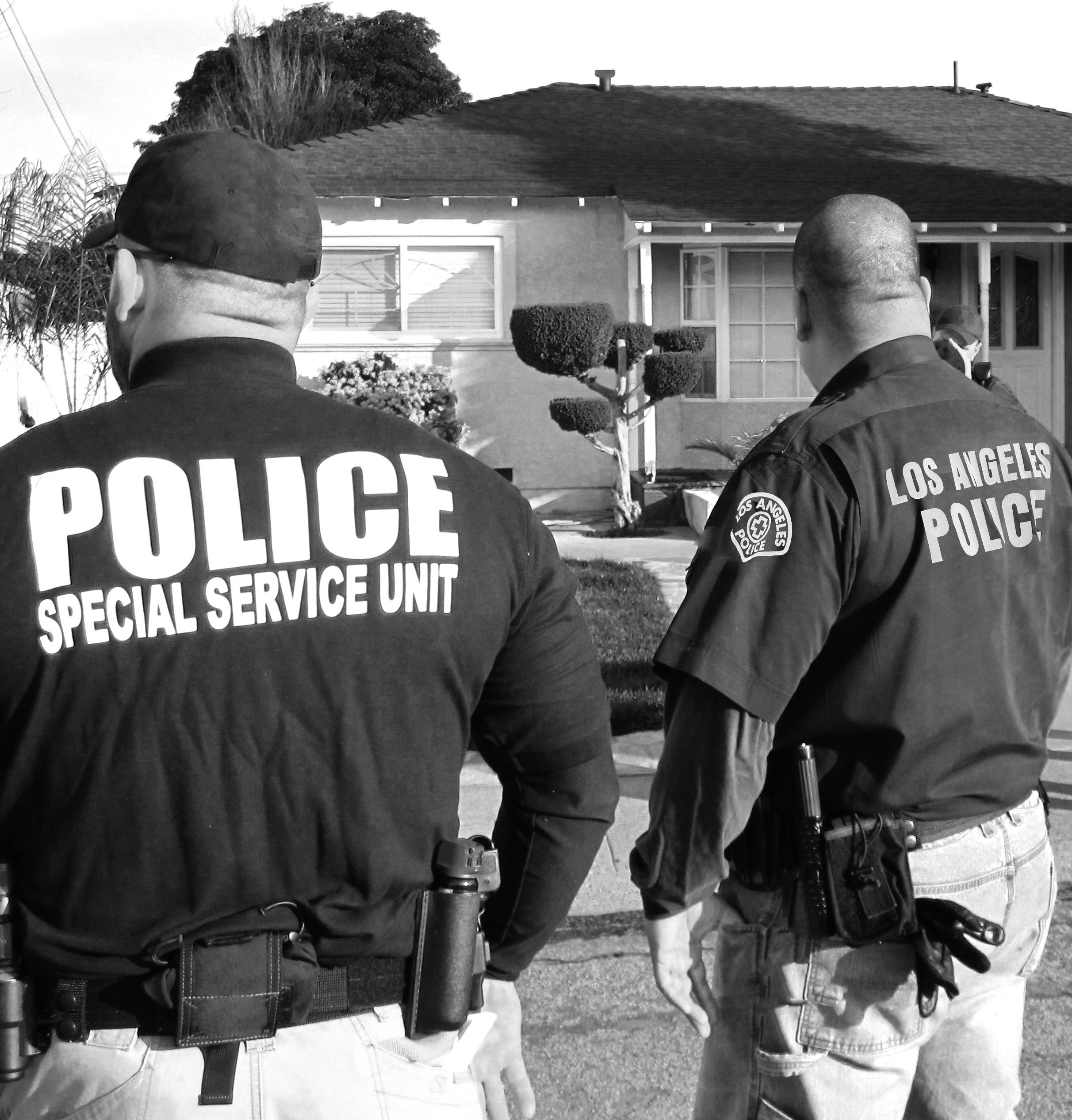
Agents assisting LAPD circa 1999

The Special Service Unit (SSU) is a specialized division within the California Department of Corrections and Rehabilitation (CDCR) that functions as its dedicated special mission unit. This unit is composed of highly trained special agents who are strategically assigned to various field offices across the state of California.

Unlike traditional correctional officers or parole agents, the agents of the SSU hold the status of full-time peace officer, defined under California Penal Code Section 830.2. This classification aligns them more closely with state police officers, endowing them with a unique set of responsibilities and authority.

The primary mission of SSU is to investigate serious crimes involving current and former inmates of the California Department of Corrections and Rehabilitation (CDCR), as well as people on state parole. These investigators work closely with other law enforcement agencies to handle complex cases. Their day-to-day work includes surveillance, witnesses interviews, evidence collection, and carrying out search warrants. By focusing on criminal activity tied to prison populations and individuals re-entering the community, SSU agents help protect public safety and support the broader justice system.

Part of their job involves closely monitoring prison gangs, which are often deeply involved in the drug trade. Because of this, SSU agents focus heavily on gathering intelligence and enforcing narcotics laws. They build strong partnerships with various law enforcement entities, including the Federal Bureau of Investigation, the federal Drug Enforcement Administration, county sheriff’s departments, and local police agencies.

Moreover, SSU agents stand ready to assist prison correctional investigators in challenging cases involving individuals who attempt to smuggle drugs or contraband into prisons. SSU special agents hold a rank equivalent to that of a CDCR captain and strive to maintain a low profile and minimal visibility while carrying out their missions throughout the state.

== History ==
The Special Service Unit was established in 1964 at the request of California Governor Pat Brown, in response to a harrowing event—the kidnapping of two Los Angeles police officers on March 9, 1963. This incident is chronicled in Joseph Wambaugh’s bestselling book, The Onion Field, and subsequent motion picture of the same name. The abduction and murder of one of the officers were carried out by two active state parolees, Gregory Powell and Jimmy Lee Smith (also known as Jimmy Youngblood).

At the time, LAPD officers Ian Campbell and Karl Hettinger were performing a routine traffic stop at the intersection of Carlos Avenue and Gower Street in Hollywood. Suddenly, the vehicle's occupants, Powell and Smith, pulled out their weapons, overpowered the officers, and forced them into Powell's car. They drove out of the city, ultimately stopping in an onion field near Bakersfield, California. There, Officer Campbell was tragically shot and killed, while Officer Hettinger managed to escape, narrowly avoiding a similar fate.

Following the incident, the investigation revealed significant challenges in obtaining timely and necessary information from the department of corrections, which was hampered by its size and bureaucracy. As a result, detectives needed a more efficient way to access essential records and resources from the CDCR. In late 1963, the Governor’s Conference on Violence was convened in Los Angeles, California. A sub-committee was formed consisting of Attorney General Thomas Lynch, Los Angeles Police Chief William Parker, San Francisco Police Chief Thomas Cahill, Oakland Police Chief Edward Toothman, Alameda County Superior Court Judge Folger Emerson, Governor’s Executive Clemency Secretary John McInerney, Marin County District Attorney Roger Garrity, and San Joaquin County Sheriff Mike Canliss. One of the recommendations from the sub-committee was the formation of a unit within the department of corrections aimed at establishing and furthering liaison activities between the CDCR, street law enforcement, district attorneys, and the courts. A decision was made to form a specialized unit within CDCR to liaison between the department and outside agencies.

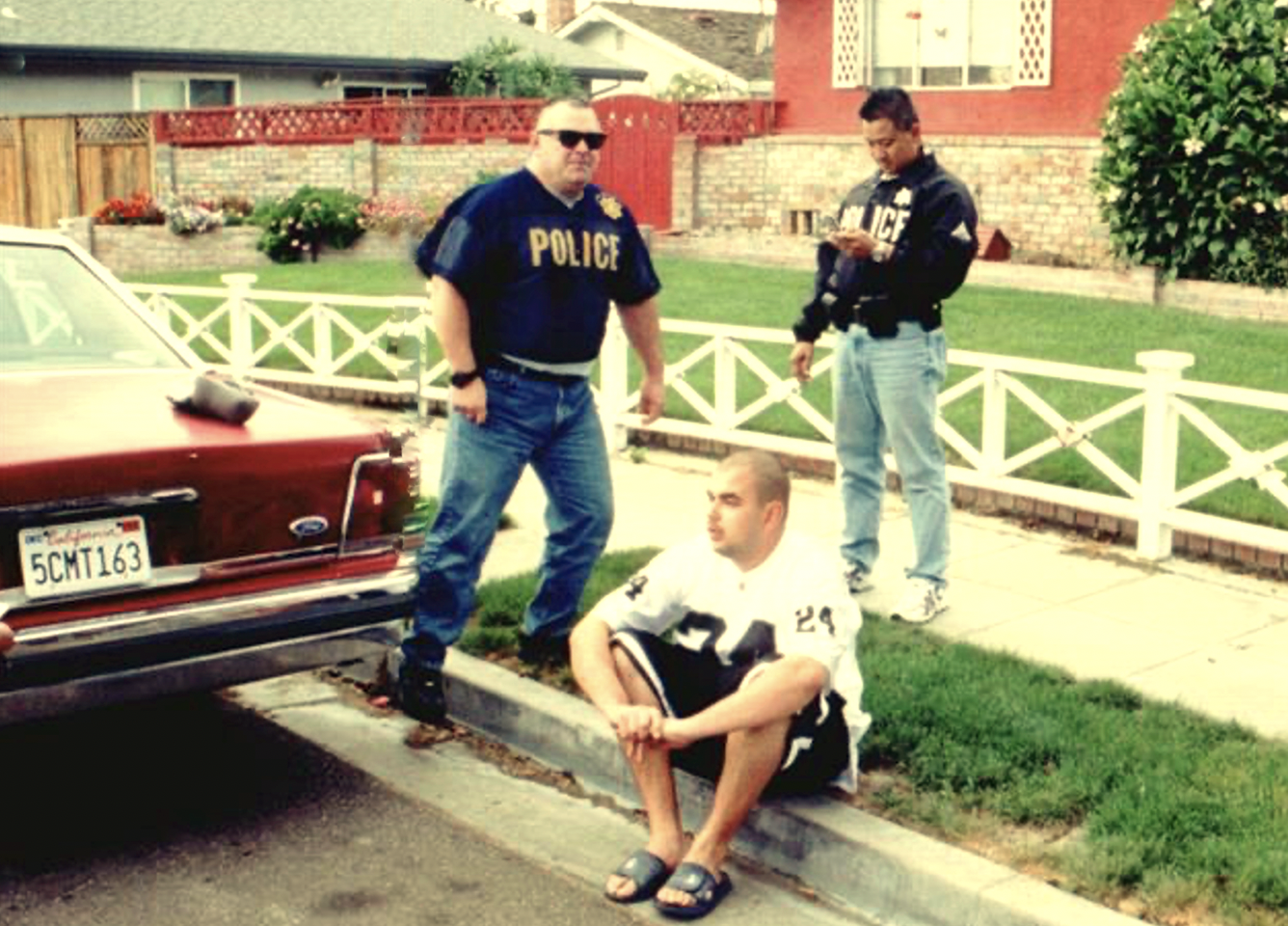
SSU stopping a parolee circa 1999

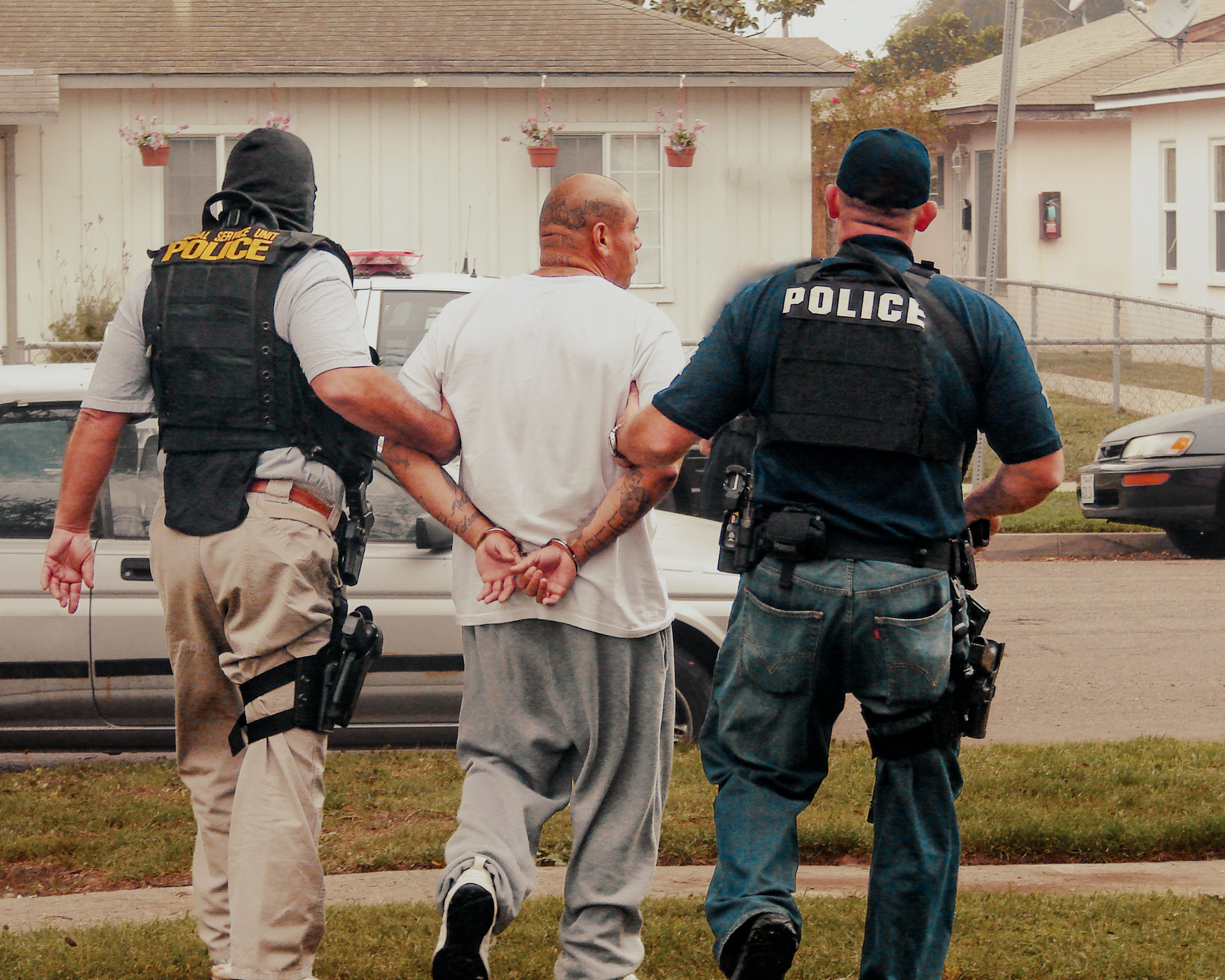
SSU arresting a prison escapee in Santa Barbara, Calif. 2009

CDCR Assistant Director Charles Casey was tasked with creating this new unit. Director Casey learned of a New York Department of Corrections team that ostensibly bridged the gap between New York state parole services and local law enforcement. Casey went to New York and met with Russell H. Oswald, the New York State Parole Board chairman and founder of the New York Bureau of Special Services. Based on his study and evaluation of the Bureau of Special Services, Casey returned to California and designed his team. After the state legislature approved its formation, the Law Enforcement Intelligence and Liaison Unit (later shortened to Law Enforcement Intelligence Unit {LEIU}) officially went into service in April 1964. The unit initially consisted of six special agents. In 1966, four additional special agents were added to the team. The name was changed to the Special Service Unit. By 1975, there were three regional SSU offices in Sacramento, Corte Madera, and El Monte.

== Function ==
The Special Service Unit is the primary investigative body for the California Department of Corrections and Rehabilitation when it comes to cases involving prisoners, parolees, or situations directly linked to CDCR. According to its official description, SSU "conducts major criminal investigations, apprehends prison escapees and parolees wanted for serious and violent felonies, manages the department's gang-related issues, and leads complex investigations into gang activity involving inmates and parolees." In simpler terms, the unit plays a critical, multifaceted role in ensuring public safety by handling a wide range of tasks as needed.

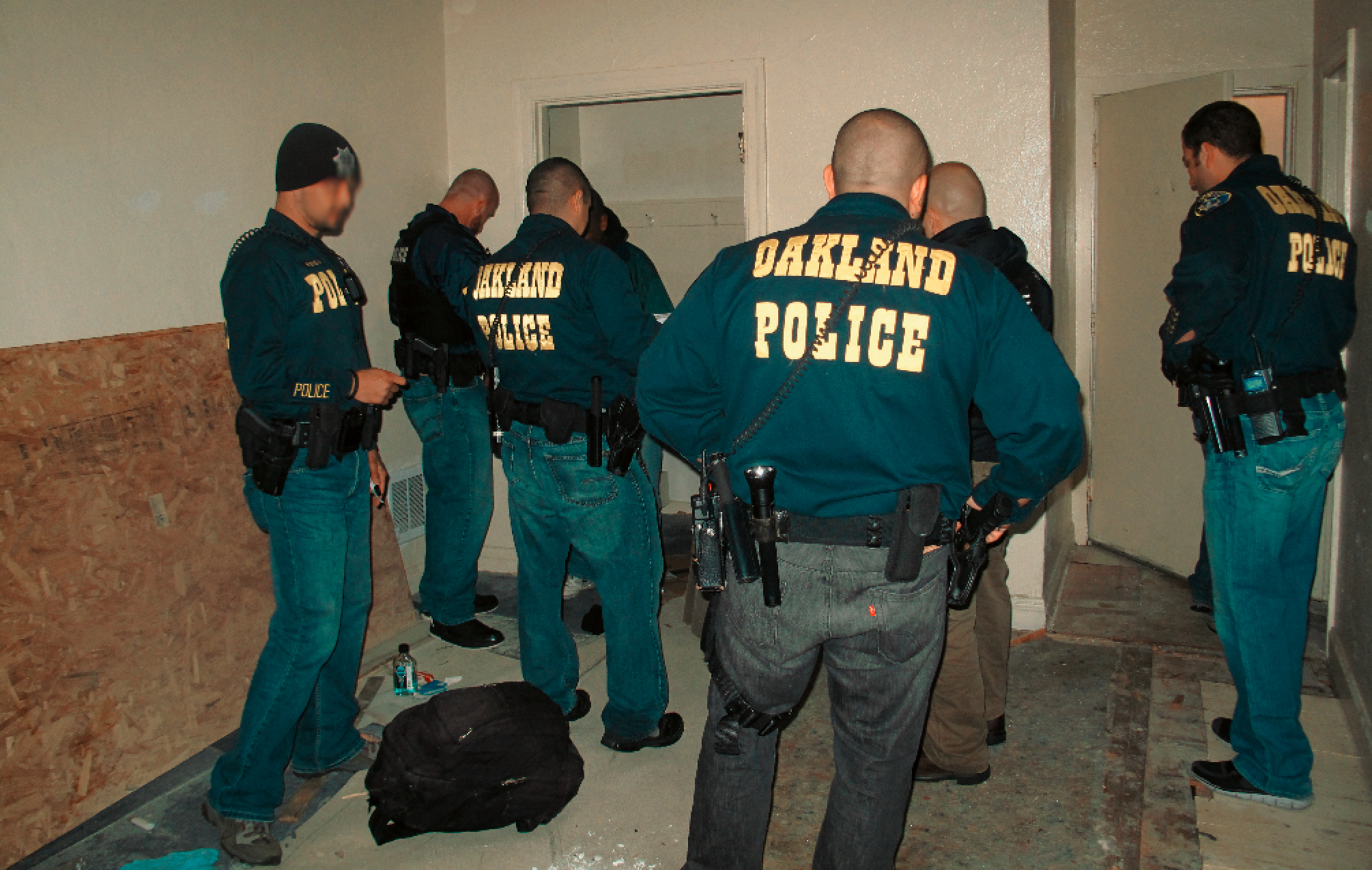
Oakland PD Gang Task Force and SSU

Special agents come from a variety of backgrounds. Some have worked their way up through CDCR as correctional officers or parole agents. An internal candidate must hold the equivalent rank of lieutenant or above to apply to SSU. Law enforcement officers from outside agencies can also apply. They come from local police, sheriff's departments, or other state police services. Those individuals ordinarily come with an extensive investigative and tactical background, usually having served in a detective unit and on a special weapons and tactics team (SWAT). An external candidate must take a written exam and be ranked on a list.

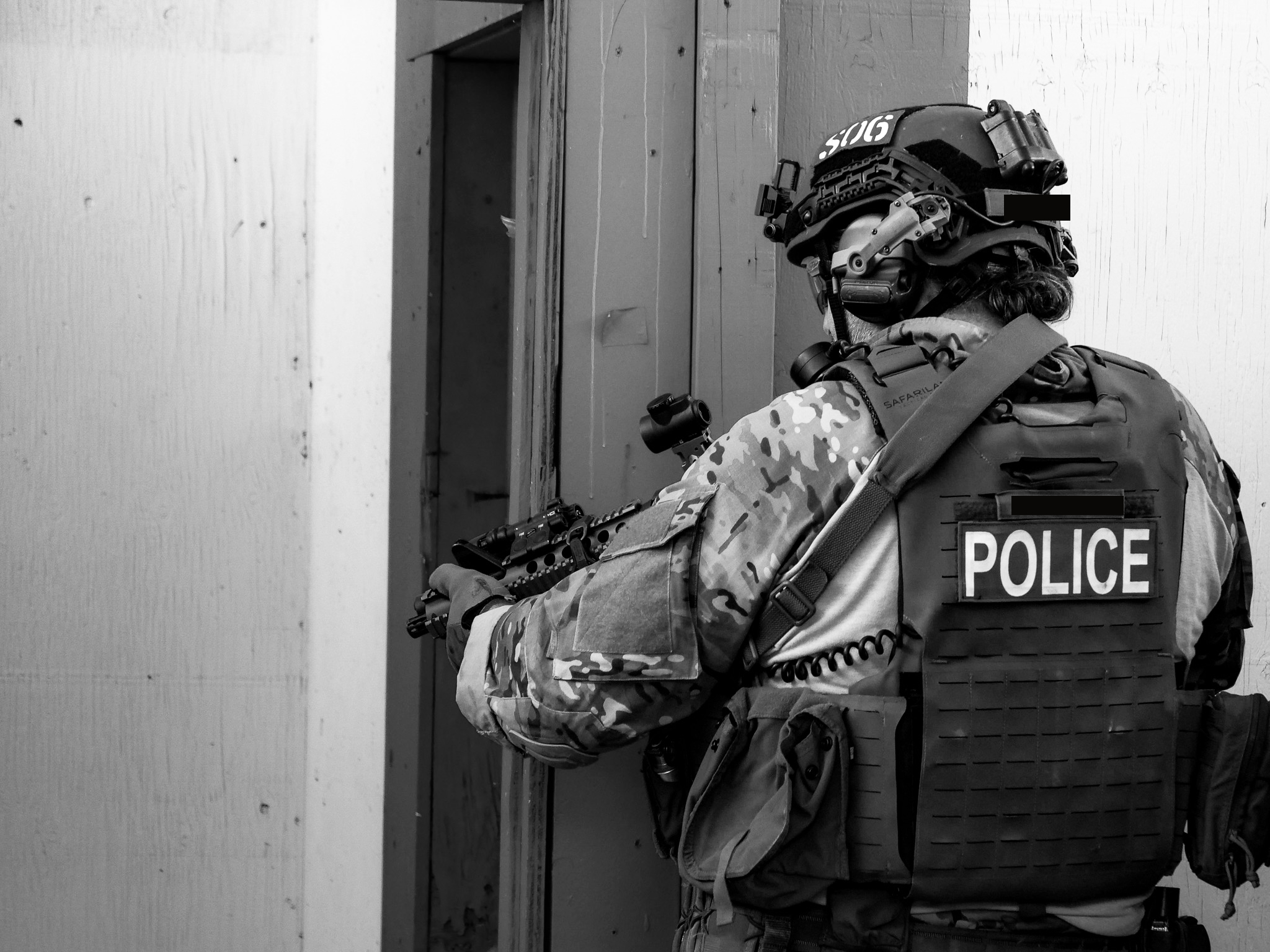
SSU agent conducting a building clearance during a warrant service

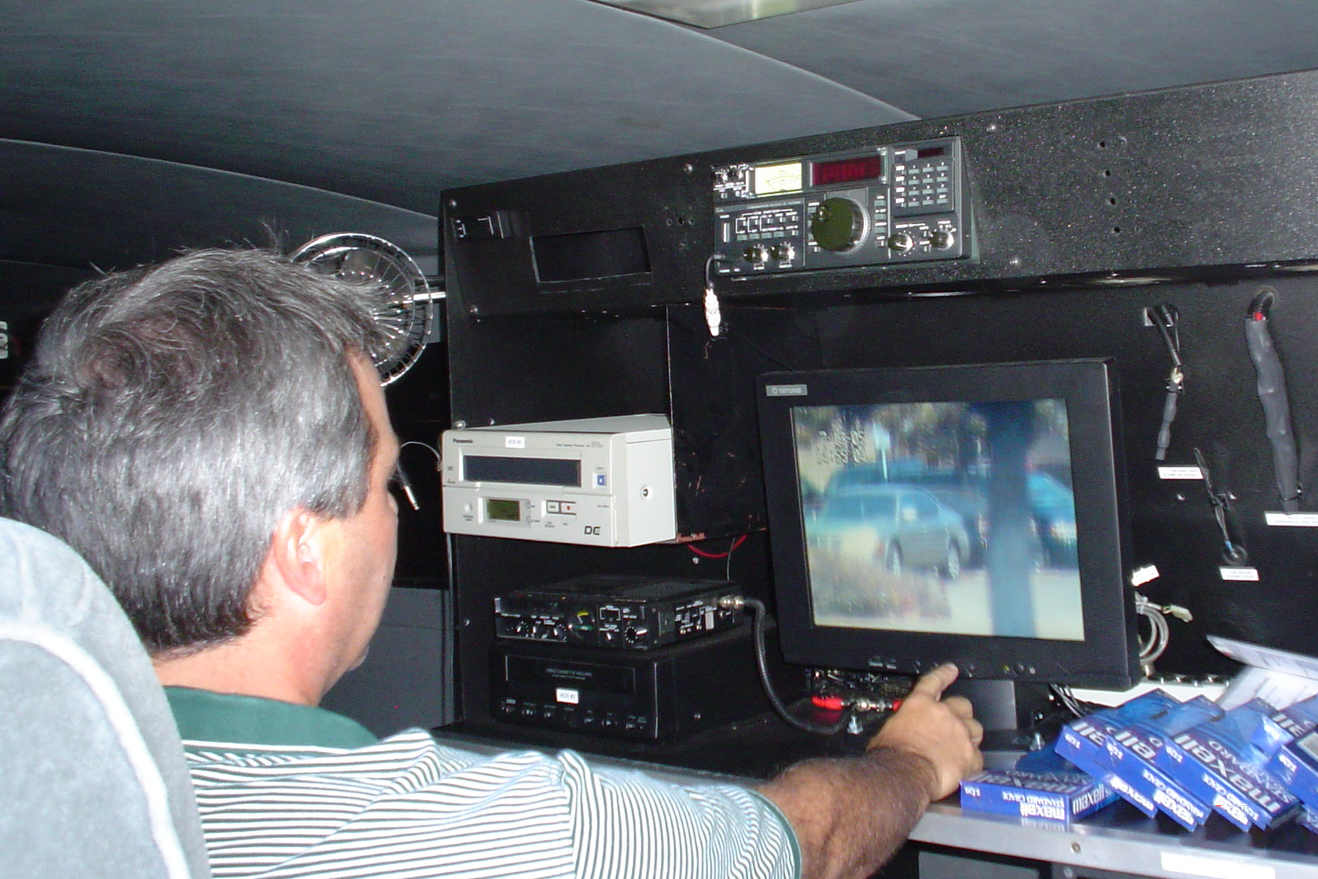
SSU agent conducting surveillance circa 2005

When an opening becomes available in one of the field offices, candidates on the list will be offered an oral interview. If selected, the candidate will have to pass an extensive background check, as well as physical and psychological exams, to be offered a position with the unit.

== Current Structure of SSU ==
The Special Service Unit (SSU) has maintained its original design as a compact and highly mobile unit. As of 2018, the California Department of Corrections and Rehabilitation (CDCR) reports fewer than forty SSU agents. These agents are strategically stationed at discreet, off-site locations across California.

Equipped with advanced tactical gear, surveillance technology, and unmarked vehicles, these teams are always ready for rapid deployment, responding anywhere in the state at a moment's notice. In 2005, the California Department of Corrections and Rehabilitation (CDCR) consolidated various divisions and units to realign its organizational structure. During this reorganization, the Office of Correctional Safety (OCS) was established to function as the "Special Operations Division" for the CDCR. Within the OCS are specialized groups such as the Fugitive Apprehension Team (FAT), the Emergency Operations Unit (EOU), and the Criminal Intelligence Analysis Unit (CIAU). The Special Services Unit (SSU) became a branch of the OCS, which enhanced the training standards and tactical capabilities of the unit. The EOU serves as the tactical training cadre for the CDCR, responsible for training all CDCR Crisis Response Teams (SWAT teams) throughout the state.

With the merger into the OCS, SSU special agents are expected to maintain a higher level of proficiency in tactical firearms and high-risk entry training. Although SSU is not classified as a special weapons and tactics (SWAT) team by California POST standards, many of its agents are former SWAT operators from previous agencies or assignments. By California standards, the SSU is regarded as a "high-risk warrant service team."

As the investigative unit for CDCR, SSU special agents are responsible for staying updated on the latest investigative techniques and legal precedents. These special agents collaborate closely with law enforcement investigators from various government branches. Many SSU agents are assigned to regional task forces across California, while a select few are designated as federal task force officers, partnering with national agencies such as the Drug Enforcement Administration (DEA), Federal Bureau of Investigation (FBI), and the Bureau of Alcohol, Tobacco, Firearms and Explosives (ATF).

== Training ==
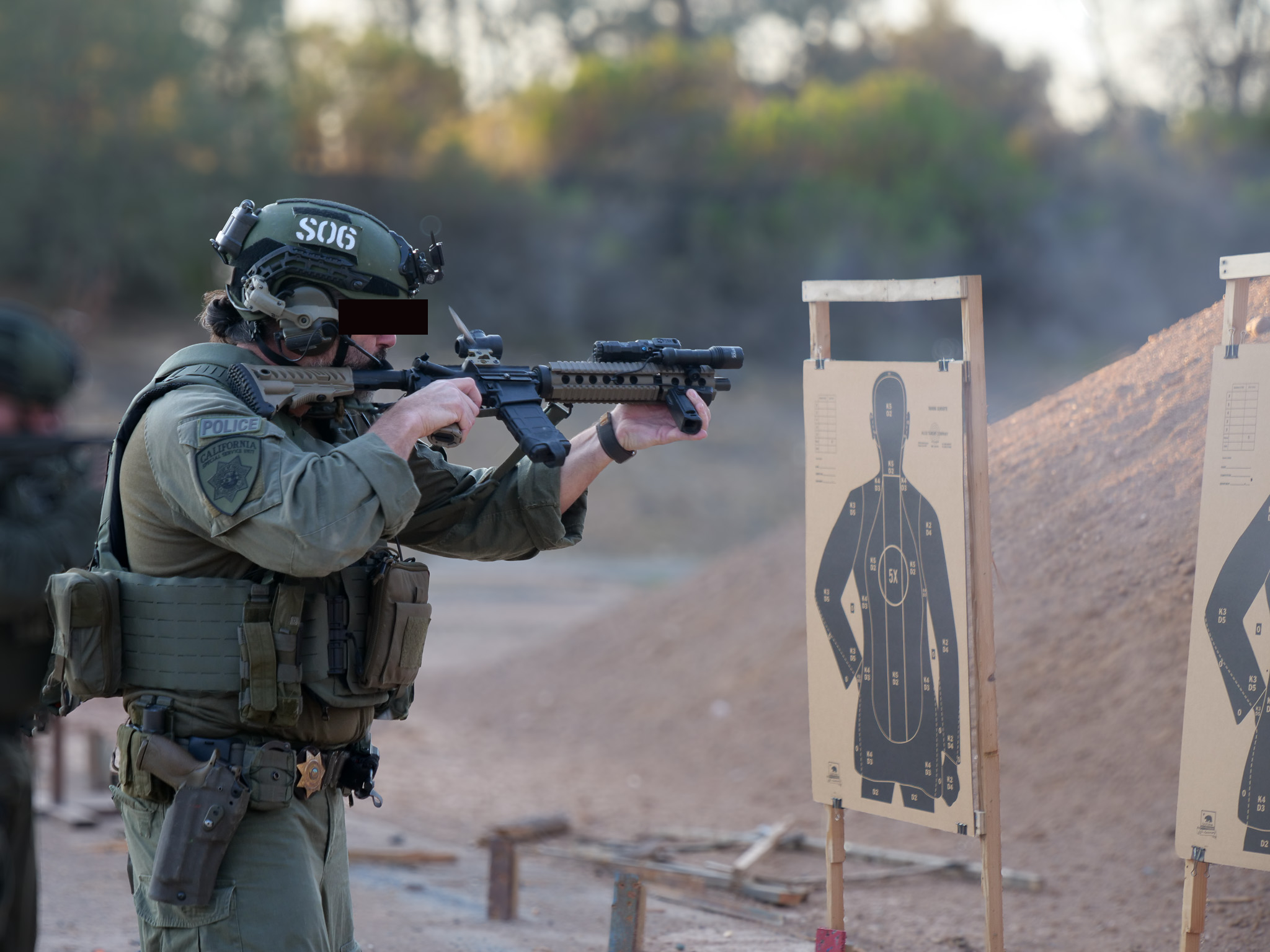
SSU agent conducting firearms training.

SSU agents undergo training to prepare for a range of investigative assignments and operating environments. Their duties include preparing criminal reports, surveillance logs, and search warrants, as well as communicating with law enforcement personnel and criminal suspects. Agents may also recruit and manage confidential informants as part of their investigations. Training further includes conducting covert surveillance and other investigative techniques.

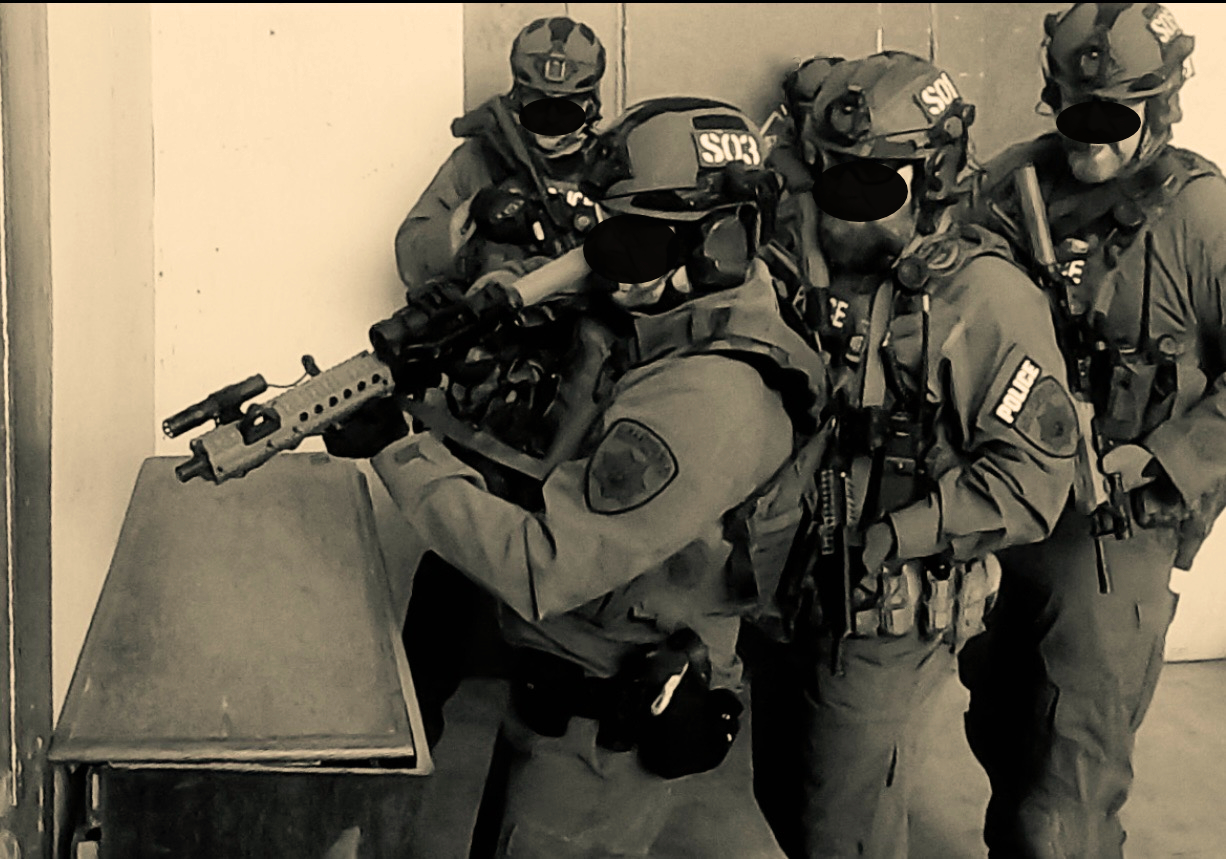
Tactical training

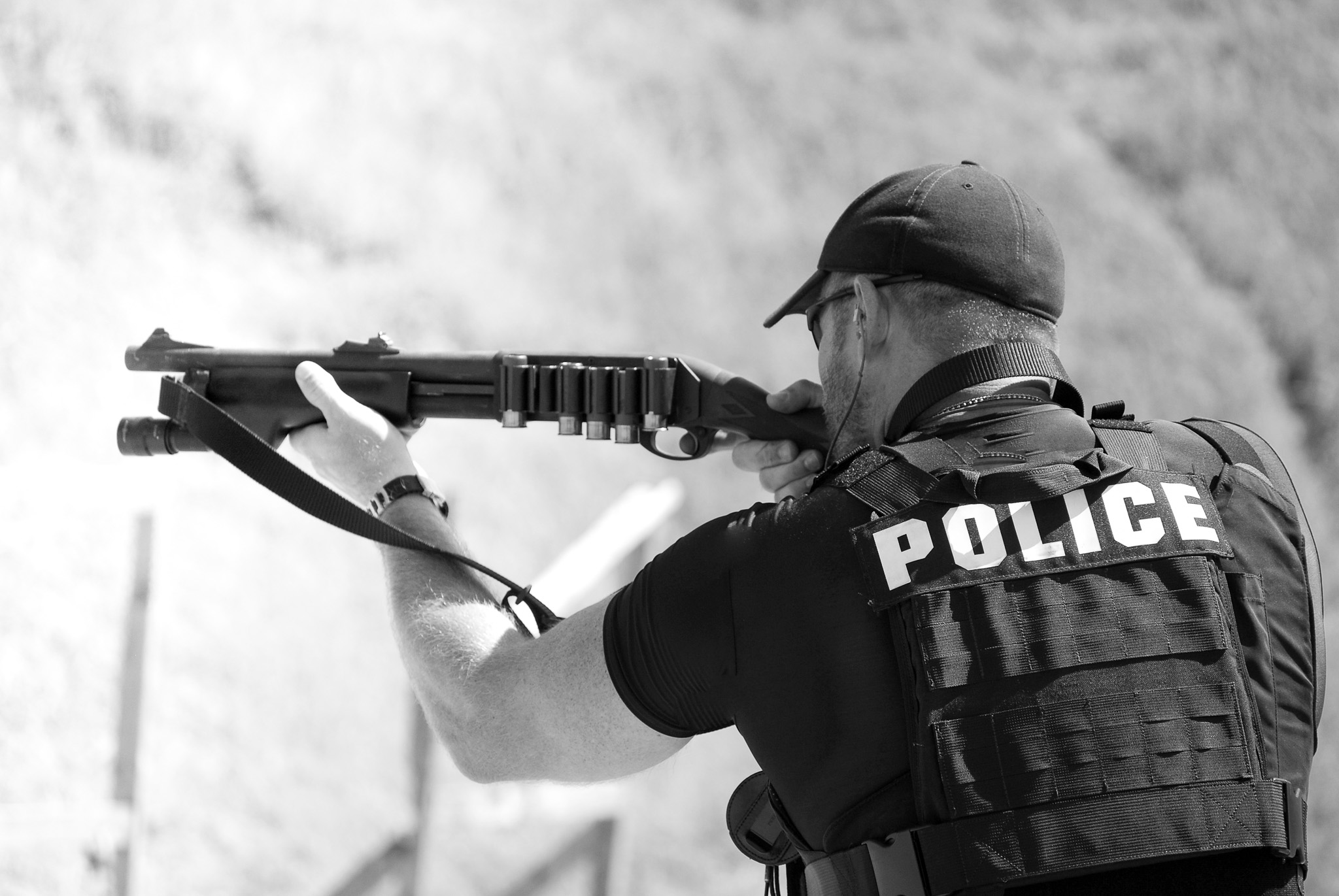
Special agent training with the Remington 870 shotgun, circa 2009.

Although SSU is not a traditional SWAT team, its agents are required to operate at a significantly higher level than standard police officers or detectives. They are responsible for serving their own search and arrest warrants and often assist other agencies that lack a dedicated warrant service unit. To maintain operational readiness and firearms proficiency, SSU agents undergo mandatory monthly range training and must meet qualification standards. Each agent is required to pass a demanding firearms qualification course developed by the California Department of Corrections and Rehabilitation’s (CDCR) Emergency Operations Unit (EOU). They must pass with each weapon system they carry, including the M4 carbine, Remington short-barreled shotgun, 9mm pistol, and any secondary firearm. Agents also participate in various training exercises, such as close-quarters defense training, tactical entry training, live-fire shoot house training, vehicle assaults, and officer rescue training.

Agents have received training from elite police units such as the LAPD SWAT team, the LAPD Special Investigation Section (SIS), and the Los Angeles Sheriff's Department Special Enforcement Bureau. Agents have also trained with military personnel from units such as the United States Navy SEALs and United States Army Special Forces.

== Prison Escapes ==
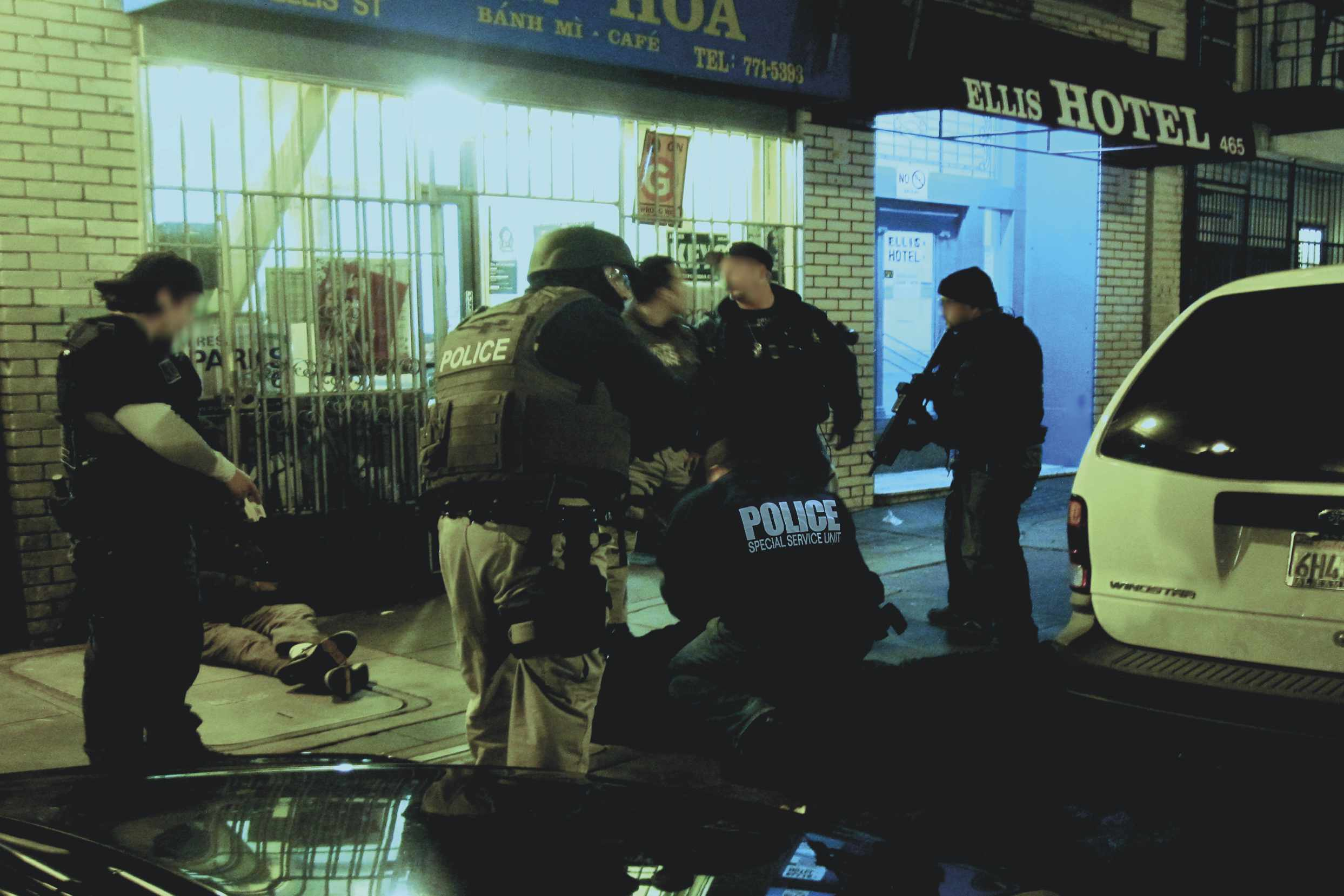
SSU arrest of a prison escapee in the Tenderloin, San Francisco, California

One of the primary functions of SSU is the investigation and apprehension of state prison escapees. The number of prison escapes from California prisons is not officially published. However, a 2018 CDCR press release webpage article states, "Since 1977, 99 percent of all offenders who have left an adult institution, camp or community-based program without permission have been apprehended." The press release says that the Special Service Unit is the specialized unit tasked with tracking down prison escapees. The press release states, "[It is] the primary departmental link with allied law enforcement agencies and the Governor’s Office of Emergency Services" and "The OCS mission is to protect the public and serve CDCR investigative and security interests."

A large majority of the escapes occur from minimum-security facilities, such as fire camps. Inmates are also placed back in the community through the Alternative Custody Program (ACP) and will sometimes flee instead of completing the program. These are considered prison escapes by state statute.

One of the most high-profile prison escapes occurred from Folsom State Prison on June 5, 1987. Inmate Glen Godwin, a convicted murderer, escaped the then-maximum security prison. He reportedly escaped through a storm drain and into the American River, which flows adjacent to the west side of the prison. Godwin has been featured on several television documentaries and was on the FBI Ten Most Wanted Fugitives list for twenty years. As of 2023, the case was still open and being worked as a cold case by investigators.

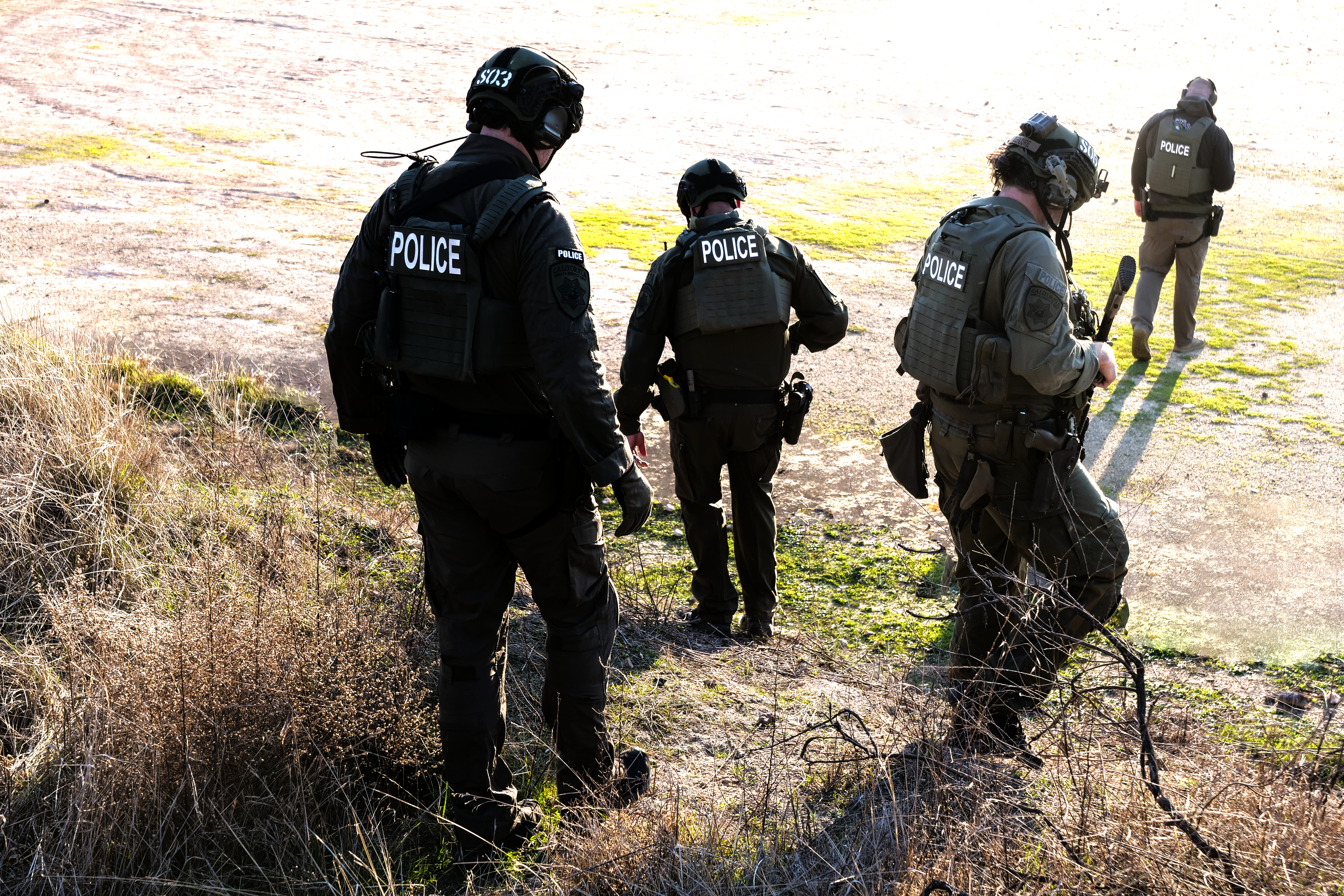
SSU searching for a prison escapee in the Sierra Nevada foothills

In August 2014, convicted murderer Scott Landers escaped from the back of a CDCR transport van while on Interstate 5 just north of Atwater, California Landers had been convicted of stabbing a 61-year-old man in Riverside County and was serving twenty-five years to life. Upon his escape, SSU agents were called in from across the state to assist with his apprehension. Within twenty-four hours, the escaped murderer was caught and brought back into custody.

On December 2, 2024, convicted murderer Cesar Moises Hernandez, escaped from custody while attending a court hearing in Delano, California. Hernandez had been convicted of first-degree murder and being a felon in possession of a gun. He was sentenced to a total term of 80 years to life in prison. He had been serving his sentence at Kern Valley State Prison, after being committed to state prison in 2019. He was originally from Los Angeles County, California.

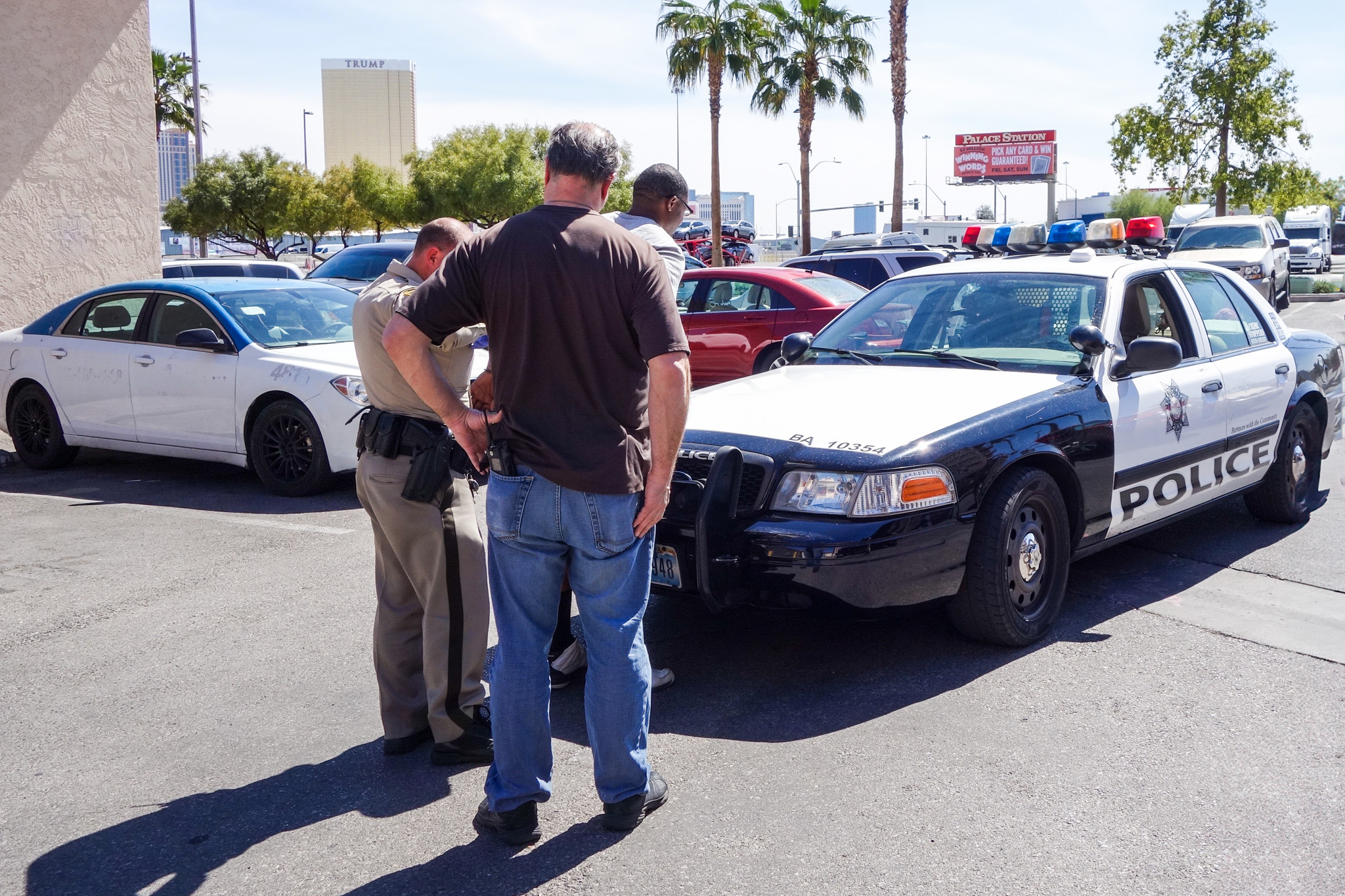
SSU tracks escaped CDCR convict to Las Vegas, Nevada, circa 2010.

Hernandez was allegedly able to defeat his restraints and break free from a prison transport van in the parking lot of the Kern County Superior Courthouse in Delano. SSU was alerted and officers responded from throughout the state. A citywide dragnet was placed around Delano in an effort to locate Hernandez. Hundreds of law enforcement officers from multiple agencies responded to assist, but Hernandez managed to elude capture.

On April 9, 2025, Mexican police located Hernández in the Barcelona Residential subdivision of Tijuana, Mexico. When officers attempted to apprehend him, Hernández opened fire, engaging in a shootout that resulted in the death of a police commander.

The large-scale operation involved more than 50 officers, who were part of a special task force assigned to track down international fugitives. Despite the heavy police presence, Hernández managed to escape after barricading himself inside a residence for several hours, firing repeatedly at law enforcement from within.

On April 17, 2025, Hernández was captured in Tijuana, Mexico, by agents of Mexico’s State Investigation Agency during an operation known as “Gracela.” The operation was carried out in coordination with the National Defense's special operations group. Acting on a search warrant, authorities entered a wooden room on a property in the Lomas de Matamoros neighborhood, where Hernández had been residing.

== High Profile Cases ==
The Special Service Unit has been quietly involved in numerous high-profile cases throughout its fifty-year history. One example is the Patricia Hearst kidnapping by the Symbionese Liberation Army (SLA) in 1974. The SLA was a radical left-wing organization formed in Soledad Prison by Donald DeFreeze. In 1973 Defreeze escaped from prison and led the SLA on the streets when they kidnapped Hearst. The day after Hearst's kidnapping, special agents from the unit's San Francisco office provided police with photographs of suspects who matched the description of one of the abductors. Thanks to photographs supplied by SSU, DeFreeze was positively identified as one of Hearst's abductors. That identification led to a lengthy investigation of SLA and its origin behind prison walls.

Another notable example is the high-profile murders that shook Los Angeles in the late 1960s. Members of Charles Manson's cult, known for the term "Helter Skelter," were responsible for these brutal killings. During the investigation into the cult, special agents from the SSU were called upon by the Los Angeles Police Department to interview Bruce Davis, a follower of Manson. Davis had been convicted of the 1969 murder of Gary Hinman in Los Angeles. Law enforcement attempted to persuade Davis, a devoted member of Manson's group, to become an informant regarding several unsolved murders linked to the Manson Family.

On January 26, 2001, San Francisco resident Diane Whipple was attacked and killed by two large presa canario dogs in the hallway of her apartment building. The dogs, Bane and Hera, were owned by Whipple's neighbors, Marjorie Knoller and Robert Noel. The dogs' actual owner, Paul Schneider, was a high-ranking member of the Aryan Brotherhood prison gang serving a life sentence in Pelican Bay State Prison. The Special Service Unit had been investigating the Aryan Brotherhood and its illegal dog breeding business for several months before the death of Whipple. SSU assisted local law enforcement during the investigation and prosecution of Knoller and Noel.

In August 2009, Phillip Garrido was arrested in Antioch, California, for the kidnapping of Jaycee Dugard. He had kidnapped her eighteen years prior and kept her in captivity. The Hayward, California police department was interested in Garrido related to the 1988 kidnapping of nine-year-old Michaela Garecht. Special agents from SSU assisted the detectives from the Hayward Police Department in the ensuing investigation. In 2011, they assisted in conducting interviews with Garrido and his wife, Nancy Garrido, who had been sentenced to state prison in California.

In February 2012, the Occupy Movement conducted a protest at the east gate of San Quentin Prison, located in Marin County, California SSU special agents worked undercover and infiltrated the group of protestors. Their mission was to gain intelligence if the protest turned violent or the prison's security was compromised.

In 2012, SSU special agents became involved in the Speed Freak Killers investigation. Agents interviewed convicted serial killer Wesley Shermantine at San Quentin State Prison. Shermantine was a condemned inmate awaiting execution on death row. Shermantine provided agents with information about the whereabouts of victims’ bodies, buried in Calaveras and San Joaquin counties. He claimed the remains were those of victims he and his childhood friend, Loren Herzog, had murdered. In August 2012, SSU agents removed Shermantine from Death Row and conducted a covert transport to the areas he described in Calaveras County and San Joaquin County. Shermantine directed SSU to where he and Herzog had allegedly buried their victims. FBI Evidence Response Team members responded and marked the locations identified by the serial killer and later conducted forensic excavations searching for human remains.

In February 2018, SSU culminated a year-long operation with the Federal Bureau of Investigation, code-named "Silent Night." The investigation focused on the Nuestra Familia prison gang and its control over Northern California communities. The investigation centered on Woodland, California, and the street gang called "Varrio Bosque Norteno." An arrest sweep of 29 suspects took place on February 14, 2018.

On June 6, 2019, The United States Attorney's Office in Sacramento, California, indicted sixteen members and associates of the Aryan Brotherhood prison gang; the indictments stemmed from a five-year investigation led by the Drug Enforcement Administration and the Special Service Unit. The government alleged that top officials within the Aryan Brotherhood organization used smuggled phones to order murders and orchestrate a multi-state drug trafficking operation from their prison cells.

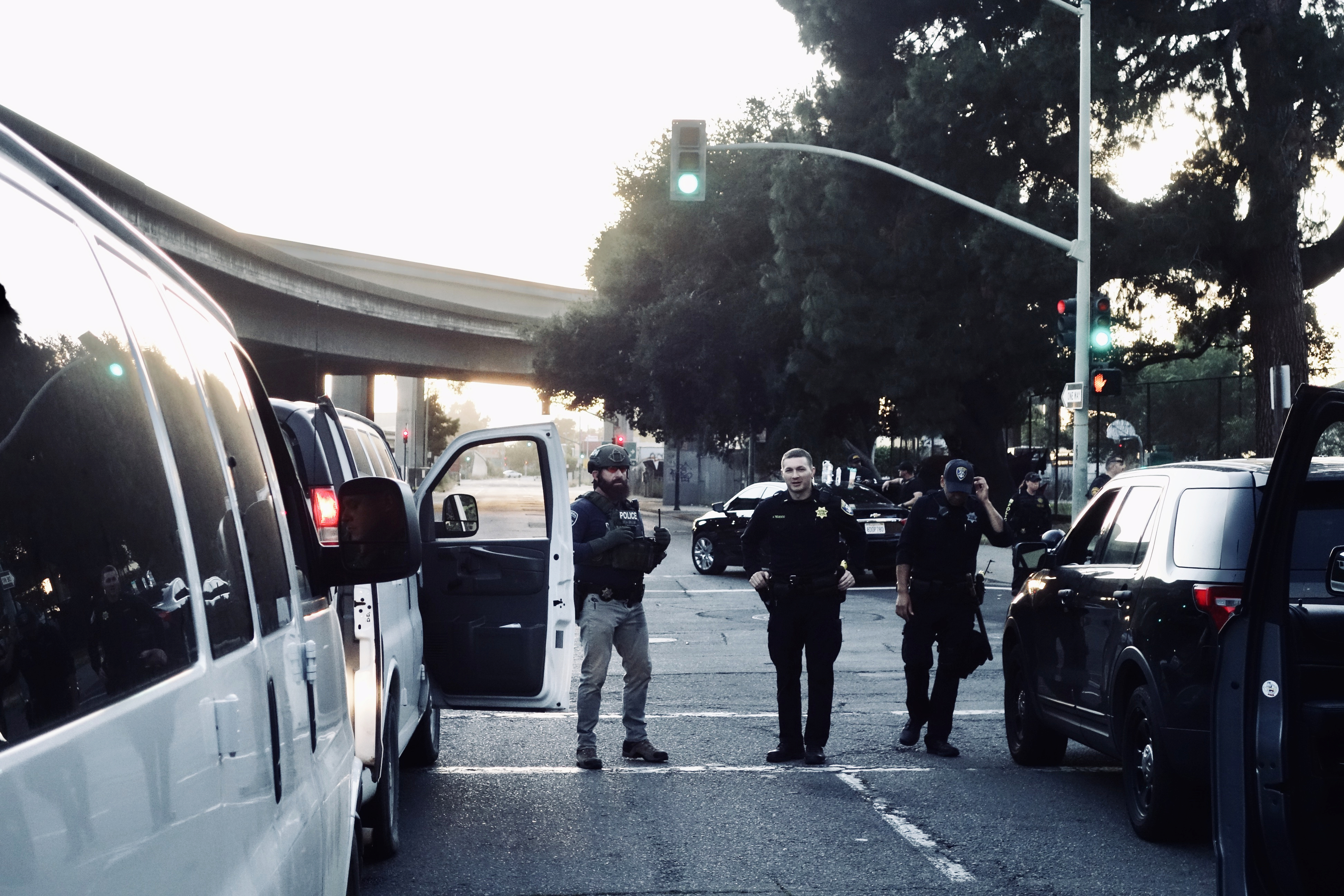
SSU agents assisting Oakland Police during the 2020 George Floyd protests.

During the 2020 George Floyd protests in Oakland, California, the Special Service Unit played a crucial role in maintaining public safety and responding to civil unrest. Tasked with crowd control and tactical operations, the SSU assisted the Oakland Police Department (OPD) in managing large demonstrations, protecting critical infrastructure, and addressing incidents of vandalism and looting. The unit worked alongside OPD to de-escalate tensions while ensuring the rights of protesters were upheld. Their efforts included dispersing unlawful gatherings, making arrests when necessary, and providing rapid response to emergencies.

== Exporting Chaos: The Secret Fallout of California’s Prison Transfers ==
Faced with a prison system bursting at the seams, California turned to a drastic solution: exporting its inmates. Between 2006 and 2019, the California Department of Corrections and Rehabilitation (CDCR) quietly shipped thousands of prisoners to private, for-profit facilities in other states. Launched under Governor Arnold Schwarzenegger, the program was billed as a necessary emergency measure to ease dangerous overcrowding. At its peak in 2010, more than 10,000 inmates were housed in far-flung prisons across Arizona, Mississippi, and Oklahoma. The transfers were part of the state’s scramble to meet a federal court order mandating population reduction—a move that sparked debate over public safety, prison conditions, and the ethics of outsourcing punishment.

What began as a desperate fix to California’s prison overcrowding crisis turned into an unexpected expansion of criminal influence across state lines. When thousands of inmates, many affiliated with sophisticated prison gangs, were transferred to out-of-state private prisons, the move backfired. These facilities, often staffed by undertrained and inexperienced personnel, quickly became overwhelmed. Contraband like cell phones and narcotics flowed freely behind bars, allowing gang leaders to maintain and even expand their operations from afar. Using smuggled phones, they orchestrated drug sales, extorted fellow inmates, and coordinated with networks back in California. Tensions had been mounting within the prison walls as rival gang factions grew increasingly hostile. What began as subtle intimidation and territorial disputes soon escalated into open threats and violent confrontations. The atmosphere was charged with aggression, and it was only a matter of time before the situation spiraled out of control. Fueled by deep-rooted rivalries and a relentless cycle of retaliation, gang violence erupted across the facility.

The fallout didn’t stop at prison gates. Local communities surrounding these private facilities saw spikes in drug trafficking and criminal activity. As inmate families relocated to be near incarcerated loved ones, gang culture took root in unfamiliar towns, introducing new threats and pushing the boundaries of California’s criminal networks into previously untouched territory.

By 2016, California’s prison outsourcing experiment had spiraled far beyond overcrowding relief. SSU special agents were dispatched to private facilities run by Corrections Corporation of America (now CoreCivic) to uncover why violence and contraband were exploding inside the walls—and spilling into surrounding communities. What they found read like the script of a crime thriller.

After months embedded in the prisons and nearby towns, investigators discovered a sophisticated web of organized crime stretching directly back to California. Local businesses, from used car lots to small vacuum stores, were serving as fronts to receive narcotics shipments funneled in by prison gangs. Corruption ran deep: compromised staff members were caught smuggling contraband or turning a blind eye. Several employees were fired, while others flipped, feeding law enforcement critical intelligence about the drug pipeline. Several prisons riots caused CCA to request CDCR sent gang agents to Oklahoma to make an assessment.

The investigation grew so large that the FBI opened a RICO case targeting the Mexican Mafia, whose reach extended from California into Oklahoma and Mississippi. In one staggering revelation, an FBI forensic accountant traced over $3 million in drug profits to just one faction operating out of the North Fork Correctional Center in Sayre, Oklahoma—a single prison that had become a hub for a sprawling criminal enterprise.
