= The Onion Field =

1973 nonfiction book by Joseph Wambaugh

- First edition cover
- Author: Joseph Wambaugh
- Cover artist: Paul Bacon
- Language: English
- Genre: Nonfiction
- Publisher: Delacorte Press
- Publication date: 1973; 53 years ago
- Publication place: United States
- Media type: Print (Hardcover)
- Pages: 427 pp
- ISBN: 9780440066927

The Onion Field is a 1973 nonfiction book by Joseph Wambaugh, a sergeant for the Los Angeles Police Department, chronicling the kidnapping of two plainclothes LAPD officers by a pair of criminals during a traffic stop and the subsequent murder of one of the officers.

== Crime ==
On the night of March 9, 1963, LAPD officers Ian Campbell (age 31) and Karl Hettinger (age 28) were riding in an unmarked police car. They pulled over a 1946 Ford coupe containing two suspicious-looking men at the corner of Carlos Avenue and Gower Street in Hollywood. The two men, Gregory Ulas Powell (age 30) and Jimmy Lee Smith (a.k.a. "Jimmy Youngblood", age 32), had recently committed a string of robberies, and "each had a pistol tucked into his trousers".

Powell, the driver, pulled a gun on Campbell, who calmly told his partner, "He has a gun in my back. Give him your gun." Hettinger did as his partner requested. The two officers were then forced into Powell's car and, within 30 seconds after the traffic stop began, were driven north from Los Angeles on Route 99, to an onion field near Bakersfield, where Campbell was fatally shot. Hettinger was able to escape, running nearly four miles to reach a farmhouse.

The killing occurred primarily because Powell assumed that the kidnapping of the officers alone already constituted a capital crime under the state's Little Lindbergh Law. However, Powell's interpretation was incorrect. Under the Little Lindbergh Law at that time, kidnapping became a capital crime only if the victim were harmed or if a ransom were demanded.

== Aftermath ==
On August 10, 2012, the intersection of Carlos Avenue and Gower Street in Hollywood, the site of the officers' abduction, was named "Ian Campbell Square" in honor of the slain officer. Additionally, a section of the Hollywood Freeway (California State Route 101) in Hollywood, from Hollywood Boulevard to Highland Avenue, was designated the "Ian J. Campbell Memorial Freeway."

=== Hettinger ===
Although Hettinger escaped, he felt scorned by his fellow officers and officials at the Los Angeles Police Department, and suffered severe emotional trauma for both the initial incident and the following treatment. Eventually a police training video was made using his experience as an example of what not to do when stopping and approaching a vehicle.

Hettinger was forced to resign from the LAPD in 1966, after being accused of shoplifting. Years later, he was elected a supervisor of Kern County, California, where he served multiple consecutive terms. He died of liver disease in 1994 at age 59.

=== The suspects ===
Powell was arrested on the night of the murder, after being spotted driving a stolen vehicle by California Highway Patrol officers. The following day, Smith was apprehended as well. The lead LAPD investigator on the case was Sergeant Pierce Brooks. Both suspects were convicted of murder and sentenced to death. Ultimately, they received life sentences. For each, the lower court sentence followed a second trial and several appeals. Their death sentences were vacated when the California Supreme Court ruled in California v. Anderson (1972) that California's death penalty was cruel and unusual punishment.

In April 1982, following the release of Jimmy Lee Smith from prison, Valerie Campbell, the daughter of the slain Officer Ian Campbell, contacted John Mancino. Mancino was the founder of Citizens for Truth, an organization that had recently led a successful petition effort to rescind the parole date of Sirhan Sirhan, who had been convicted of assassinating presidential candidate Robert F. Kennedy.

Mancino drafted a petition to have Powell's scheduled release rescinded. With Valerie Campbell's help, he collected 31,500 signatures in three and a half weeks, which were submitted to the California Board of Prison Terms, along with several thousand letters. The parole board then held a hearing and eventually rescinded Powell's release date.

Following this, Powell's attorney was successful in convincing Solano County Superior Court Judge, Ellis Randall, to order Powell's release from prison in ten days, ruling that Citizens for Truth's public outcry was the sole reason Powell's release was rescinded, which at the time was legally improper. Valerie Campbell then joined Citizens for Truth's representatives, John Mancino and Dr. Howard Garber, along with the group's attorneys, submitted a legal brief, typed by Citizens for Truth secretary, Linda Dale, and accepted by the First District Court of Appeals in San Francisco, demanding that Powell remain in prison.

The group prevailed both at the appeals court and the California Supreme Court, thereby leading to Powell's spending the rest of his life in prison, where he died in 2012.

==== Powell ====
At a parole board hearing on January 27, 2010, Powell was denied parole. In a January 21, 2010 letter to state corrections officials, Los Angeles Police Union President Paul Weber urged the board to deny parole, calling Powell a "vicious murderer who has not yet paid his debt to society".

On October 18, 2011, the California State Parole Board denied compassionate release for Powell, who had been diagnosed with terminal prostate cancer. The board stated that Powell did not wish to be released from prison and was likely to be uncooperative if paroled. Powell died on August 12, 2012, at the California Medical Facility in Vacaville. He was 79 years old.

==== Smith ====
Smith was released in 1982 but returned to prison several times on drug-related parole violations. In December 2006, he failed to report to his parole officer, and a warrant was issued for his arrest. In February 2007, a man matching Smith's description was detained by police in Los Angeles' Skid Row area and eventually identified as Smith. He was arrested, charged with violating his parole, and sent to the Pitchess Detention Center in Castaic, California. On April 7, 2007, while in that facility, he died of an apparent heart attack at age 76.

== Film and television adaptations ==
The book was adapted into a 1979 film of the same name directed by Harold Becker. It starred John Savage as Karl Hettinger, James Woods as Gregory Powell, Franklyn Seales as Jimmy Smith, and Ted Danson (in his film debut) as Ian Campbell.

TNT's Southland season 5 episode 9 titled "Chaos" (original airdate April 10, 2013) portrayed a reimagined version of the events that took place in The Onion Field.

The Adam-12 episode "Killing Ground" was based on this incident. Officers Pete Malloy and Jim Reed are kidnapped by two armed robbers on the run. The only difference is Malloy and Reed are able to escape and turn the tables on their captors.

== See also ==
- List of homicides in California
