= Southern Comfort (1981 film) =

1981 film by Walter Hill

- Theatrical release poster
- Directed by: Walter Hill
- Written by: Michael Kane; Walter Hill; David Giler
- Produced by: David Giler
- Starring: Keith Carradine; Powers Boothe; Fred Ward; T. K. Carter; Franklyn Seales
- Cinematography: Andrew Laszlo
- Edited by: Freeman A. Davies
- Music by: Ry Cooder
- Production companies: Cinema Group Ventures; Phoenix (II)
- Distributed by: 20th Century Fox
- Release date: 25 September 1981
- Running time: 105 minutes
- Country: United States
- Language: English
- Budget: $7.6 million
- Box office: $2.9 million (domestic)

Southern Comfort is a 1981 American independent Southern Gothic thriller film directed by Walter Hill and written by Michael Kane, Hill and his longtime collaborator David Giler. It stars Keith Carradine, Powers Boothe, Fred Ward, T. K. Carter, Franklyn Seales and Peter Coyote. The film, set in 1973, features a Louisiana Army National Guard squad of nine from an infantry unit on weekend maneuvers in rural bayou country as they antagonize some local Cajun people and become hunted.

Filming took place during a 55-day period in the Caddo Lake bayou in the states of Louisiana and Texas.

== Plot ==
In 1973, a squad of nine Louisiana Army National Guard soldiers convene in a local bayou for weekend maneuvers. New to the squad is Corporal Hardin, a cynical transfer from the Texas Army National Guard, who is disgusted with the arrogant behavior and attitudes of the men. Happily married in civilian life as a chemical engineer, Hardin wants no part of the prostitutes which PFC Spencer has arranged but otherwise gets along with the amiable Spencer. When the squad gets disoriented in remote swampland, Staff Sergeant Poole, their Vietnam War veteran squad leader, orders them to commandeer three pirogues from a campsite. A group of Cajun hunter-trappers discover the missing boats and PFC Stuckey fires blanks from his M60 machine gun at them. The Cajuns return fire with live ammunition, killing Poole and panicking the squad.

Sgt. Casper – the strict, inexperienced, and unpopular second-in-command – orders the squad to continue their "mission." Corporal Reece's live ammunition, intended for hunting, is distributed among the men. They encounter a one-armed Cajun hunter-trapper and Casper arrests him as a prisoner of war. The emotionally unstable Bowden attempts to burn the cabin, igniting a store of TNT inside and destroying a source of food, fresh water, guns, and ammunition. Hearing barking dogs, the Guardsmen assume they're about to be rescued but learn the Cajuns are now stalking them. The Guardsmen fend off attacking rottweilers, but Cribbs is killed by a lethal booby trap that's been set for them. Bowden begins to have a serious mental breakdown in the night and is restrained. When Reece tortures the one-armed Cajun, Hardin intervenes and they fight with bayonets until Reece is killed. The one-armed Cajun escapes into the swamp. Stuckey threatens to kill Hardin until Casper promises to have Hardin court-martialed. The rest of the squad mutinies against Casper in favor of Spencer's leadership. When Stuckey dies in quicksand trying to signal a passing helicopter, the two factions split up to search for him. Casper throws a homemade grenade at the Cajuns to no avail and is killed making a bayonet charge at them. Simms is also shot and killed.

Spencer, Hardin, and a now catatonic Bowden camp for the night and agree to fight for each other's survival. During the night, Bowden is abducted and found hanging dead from a rail bridge the next morning. The one-armed Cajun appears on the tracks overhead and warns Spencer and Hardin to leave the Cajuns' territory while they still can. Following the one-armed Cajun's directions, Spencer and Hardin follow a dirt road and hitch a ride with a friendly Cajun couple who take them to a pig roast at a nearby village. The three remaining hunter-trappers arrive and Hardin is chased into a shed and wounded. Spencer intervenes, firing blanks, and Hardin stabs his attacker in the groin. Spencer leads the other two Cajuns away from the injured Hardin, disabling one with the butt of his M16. The remaining Cajun is grabbed by Hardin and stabbed to death by Spencer.

Spencer and Hardin slip away unseen into the swamp as another helicopter arrives overhead. When they see a U.S. Army truck drive towards them on the dirt road, they realize they are finally safe.

== Cast ==
- Keith Carradine as Private First Class Spencer
- Powers Boothe as Corporal Charles Hardin
- Fred Ward as Corporal Lonnie Reece
- Franklyn Seales as Private First Class Simms
- T. K. Carter as Private Tyrone Cribbs
- Lewis Smith as Private Stuckey
- Les Lannom as Sergeant Casper
- Peter Coyote as Staff Sergeant Crawford Poole
- Carlos Brown as Corporal "Coach" Bowden
- Brion James as Cajun Trapper
- Sonny Landham as Hunter

== Production ==
=== Development ===
According to Walter Hill, he and David Giler had a deal with 20th Century Fox to "acquire and develop interesting, commercial scripts that could be produced cheaply. Alien (1979) was one of them, and Southern Comfort was another. We wanted to do a survival story, and I'd already done a film in Louisiana."

They hired a writer, Michael Kane, to do a draft which Giler and Hill then rewrote. According to one report, Hill first wrote the script in 1976. The film was known at one stage as The Prey.

According to Hill, "No studio wanted to make it, but an independent production shop showed up who had a relationship with Fox. Liked it, said they would finance it." This was The Cinema Group, a company headed by William J. Immerman, whose head of production was Venetia Stevenson, daughter of director Robert Stevenson. The Cinema Group had raised a fund of $30 million to make movies, half of which was private, the other half which was publicly raised. Southern Comfort was their second film. (Take This Job and Shove It was their first.)

Powers Boothe was cast after Hill and Giler saw him play Jim Jones in the mini series Guyana Tragedy. The other lead was Keith Carradine, who had just made The Long Riders with Hill. The director said the concept of Keith Carradine's character "was that he was one of nature's aristocrats – graceful, confident of his own ability and able to separate himself from other people with an amusing remark", whereas the character played by Boothe "is much more the rational, hardworking, self made individual" and as a result "just cannot believe the nature of the situation at first" whereas Carradine's can.

Hill had to obtain permission by the Southern Comfort liquor producer to use the film's title.

=== Shooting ===
The movie was shot in Louisiana over 55 days in the Caddo Lake area outside Shreveport. Hill:

We were very aware that people were going to see it as a metaphor for Vietnam. The day we had the cast read, before we went into the swamps, I told everybody, 'People are going to say this is about Vietnam. They can say whatever they want, but I don't want to hear another word about it.'"

The film is supported by an atmospheric soundtrack by longstanding Hill collaborator Ry Cooder. The song "Parlez Nous à Boire", sung during the scene in the Cajun village at the end of the film, was performed by Cajun musician Dewey Balfa. The film includes many actors, including Fred Ward and Peter Coyote, who had one of their first big roles here.

Hill later said he enjoyed the experience of making the film but that it was tough:

I was very proud of the actors in it. It was a tough movie to make, and they put up with a lot. They would probably tell you they put up with a lot from me. [Laughs.] But they really did it without complaint. And I just thought I was very fortunate to have the cast that I had. Jesus, it was a hard movie to make... I think when you see the movie you can see that this one wasn't nightclubs in Vegas. But it was just very hard locations to get in there. Very hard to shoot. I remember so many times we'd only have a few minutes to set the camera because the bottom of the swamp would give way. And so, for your camera positions, you had to stage and shoot very quickly in many cases. It just was hard, and the weather was miserable. However, I will say this: If you choose to go make a movie in a swamp in the middle of winter, you probably deserve what you get. [Laughs.]

"It was unbelievably tough", said Powers Boothe. "The actors would clamber out of the muck just in time to get back into it. The situation was even harder on the crew. They'd set up a camera platform and it would slowly sink into the bayou. Or with a tripod, one leg would sink. And how can actors hit their marks in two feet of water?... I have to give Walter Hill credit for making the three months as endurable as possible. We didn't lose our senses of humor until late in the shooting. Taking two weeks off at Christmas time helped keep our sanity."

Walter Hill said the film was "not a simple action movie where the people chasing the other out there is bad":

It is clearly in a sense the kind of fault of our guys for getting into this situation. In the collective group, there are individuals who are not as highly evolved as the others. And the answers to the dilemma, I mean both nature's noblemen, those of higher character through some innate quality. And you have people that operate on a sliding scale downward to the brute level in their response to the situation that they have gotten themselves into. All of which I think is a kind of, war is terrible. It's a wartime situation. With mixed results and accompanying paranoia even by those who are the best and the brightest of the bunch... None of us are quite as good or bad as we construct them. Southern Comfort is trying not to be an easy drama.

== Soundtrack ==
The music was done by Ry Cooder who had just worked with Hill on The Long Riders. Cooder later said:

Because my own musical fantasies and Walter Hill's film fantasies arc in sync, it's possible for me to score a film like Southern Comfort without understanding the first thing about its environment. All I had to do was think about this weird swamp, and the Cajun people that nobody knew about. I had to imagine what they were going to sound like, and I figured on the style of John Lee Hooker's music.

== Reception ==
Walter Hill later said he was "always amazed" by the reception to the film. "The American reception was a real kind of nothing. But it was very nicely received around the world."

He added that the movie "didn't make a fucking nickel anywhere. Foreign, domestic, anything... I was proud of the film... But I was disappointed in the lack of response. It was a universal audience failure... Usually you can say they loved it in Japan or something. I don't think anybody loved it anywhere."

On the Rotten Tomatoes website the film has received a positive reception from critics with an overall rating of 81% from 26 reviews. Metacritic, which uses a weighted average, assigned the film a score of 63 out of 100, based on 15 critics, indicating "generally favorable" reviews. Roger Ebert rated it 3 stars, stating that it is "a film of drum-tight professionalism" but criticizing it for making its characters "into larger-than-life stick figures, into symbolic units who stand for everything except themselves." While he said that the stock nature of the characters reminded him greatly of the way Hill approached the gang members in The Warriors (to which he gave a 2 stars, thumbs down review) he also said that he would recommend Southern Comfort partly because he had overlooked good qualities of Hill's previous film over that issue, and that the atmosphere and pacing of Southern Comfort were so strong that he gave it a thumbs up. At the time critics regularly made reference to the film's plot similarities to John Boorman's 1972 thriller Deliverance.

== See also ==
- List of American films of 1981
- Survival film, about the film genre, with a list of related films
- "Amos Moses", 1970 song by Jerry Reed about a one-armed Cajun poacher

== Bibliography ==
- Cliffe, Samantha (3 July 2013). "Looking Back at Walter Hill's Southern Comfort". Den of Geek. Archived from the original on 5 July 2013.
- Gingold, Michael (October 2013). "Southern Comfort:Enraging Cajuns". Fangoria. No. 327.
- Murphy, Ian (31 October 2012). ""Human Frailty Swallowed Whole": On Walter Hill's Southern Comfort (1981)". Bright Lights Film Journal.
- Murray, Noel (7 July 2014). "Southern Comfort". The Dissolve.
- Sragow, Michael (July 1982). "Don't Jesse James Me". Sight and Sound. pp. 194–198.
