= The Onion Field (film) =

1979 film directed by Harold Becker

- Theatrical release poster
- Directed by: Harold Becker
- Screenplay by: Joseph Wambaugh
- Based on: The Onion Field (1973 book) by Joseph Wambaugh
- Produced by: Walter Coblenz
- Starring: John Savage; James Woods; Franklyn Seales; Ronny Cox
- Cinematography: Charles Rosher, Jr.
- Edited by: John W. Wheeler
- Music by: Eumir Deodato
- Production company: Black Marble Productions
- Distributed by: AVCO Embassy Pictures
- Release dates: September 7, 1979 (Toronto); September 19, 1979 (U.S.)
- Running time: 126 minutes
- Country: United States
- Language: English
- Budget: $2.6 million
- Box office: $5–9.9 million

The Onion Field is a 1979 American neo-noir crime drama film directed by Harold Becker, and adapted by Joseph Wambaugh from his 1973 true crime book. The film is a dramatization of the March 1963 "Onion Field incident", in which two Los Angeles police officers were kidnapped, and one murdered, by Gregory Powell and Jimmy Lee Smith. It stars John Savage, James Woods, Franklyn Seales, Ronny Cox, Christopher Lloyd, and Ted Danson in his film debut.

The film premiered at the 1979 Toronto International Film Festival, and was released in the United States by AVCO Embassy Pictures on September 19, 1979. It received positive reviews from critics and was a moderate commercial success. Woods' performance as Powell was widely-praised, and earned him a Golden Globe nomination for Best Actor in a Motion Picture – Drama.

== Plot ==
In 1963, Los Angeles Police Department (LAPD) detectives Karl Hettinger and Ian Campbell are kidnapped by criminals Gregory Powell and Jimmy "Youngblood" Smith after pulling over the criminals for an illegal U-turn. They are driven to an onion field near Bakersfield, California, where Campbell is shot and killed before Hettinger narrowly escapes as a cloud passes in front of the moon, plunging the onion field into darkness.

Hettinger's eyewitness account leads to the arrest of the two men, who are tried and convicted of first-degree murder. While they languish on death row, Powell and Smith learn how to exploit the legal system, and after a series of appeals, their sentences are reduced to life imprisonment following a court decision abolishing executions in California.

Meanwhile, Hettinger's physical condition and emotional state slowly deteriorate as his failure to act more aggressively on the night of the incident is questioned by those in authority and his fellow officers. Wracked with guilt and remorse, he experiences nightmares, impotence, weight loss, kleptomania and thoughts of suicide. Hettinger is forced to resign from the police department after being caught shoplifting and opens up his own gardening business.

== Cast ==
- John Savage as Officer Karl Hettinger
- James Woods as Gregory Powell
- Franklyn Seales as Jimmy Lee Smith
- Ted Danson as Officer Ian Campbell
- Ronny Cox as Sgt. Pierce Brooks
- David Huffman as District Attorney Phil Halpin
- Christopher Lloyd as Jailhouse lawyer
- Dianne Hull as Helen Hettinger
- Priscilla Pointer as Chrissie Campbell
- K Callan as Mrs. Powell
- Sandy McPeak as Mr. Powell
- Richard Venture as Det. Glenn Bates
- Lillian Randolph as Nana, Jimmy's grandma
- Richard E. Kalk as Bailiff
- Steve Conte as Prison guard
- John de Lancie as LAPD Lieutenant
- William J. Sanderson as Young con
- Charles Cyphers as Chaplain
- Sandy Ward as Pawnbroker
- Richard Herd as Beat Cop

== Production ==
The film was shot on location in Valencia, Los Angeles, Maricopa and Taft in California. A courtroom of the Superior Court of Los Angeles County was used for the trial scenes. The jury panel was taken to an onion field in Valencia to inspect it as a replica of the scene of the crime.

Wambaugh helped to produce the film and chose the cast and crew, including actor Ted Danson, who made his film debut. Wambaugh reportedly was determined to make a film superior to the 1977 adaptation of his novel The Choirboys, the script of which written by another writer. Wambaugh sued the makers of The Choirboys and his name was removed from the credits.

Eric Roth was an uncredited script doctor.

== Release ==
The Onion Field premiered at the Toronto International Film Festival on September 7, 1979 before opening in New York City on September 19. It grossed $196,716 in its first 5 days from 10 theatres in New York and then expanded to open in Los Angeles and Chicago.

=== Home media ===
MGM Home Entertainment released the film as a Region 1 DVD on September 17, 2002. The film is in anamorphic widescreen format with subtitles in English, Spanish and French. Bonus features include commentary by director Harold Becker and a featurette about the making of the film.

The film was released on Blu-Ray in the U.S. by Kino Lorber in June 2015.

== Reception ==
=== Critical response ===
The movie opened to positive praise as a true story of justice mishandled. Janet Maslin of The New York Times observed: "This is a strong, affecting story but it's also a straggly one, populated by tangential figures and parallel plotlines. The criminals' histories are every bit as convoluted and fascinating as those of the policemen they abducted. Even the courtroom drama is unusually complicated, introducing a new legal team with each new trial.... The film is generally crisp and at times exciting, but it's also full of incidents that are only sketchily explained, and minus the all-important narrative thread that might have provided a clear point of view."

Variety called the film "a highly detailed dramatization" and wrote that James Woods "is chillingly effective, creating a flakiness in the character that exudes the danger of a live wire near a puddle."

Time Out London thought the film was "expertly performed" and added: "It's the usual heavy Wambaugh brew: police procedure closely observed without a trace of romanticism, suggesting simply that life in the force is psychological hell. So far, so good. But that very insistence on authenticity is followed by the film to the detriment of the narrative's dramatic structure; half way through, the whole thing begins to ramble badly. Engrossingly sordid, nevertheless."

The Onion Field holds an 87% rating on Rotten Tomatoes based on 15 reviews.

=== Accolades ===
Award	Year	Category	Nominee	Result	Ref.
Golden Globe Awards	1980	Best Actor in a Motion Picture – Drama	James Woods	Nominated	
Kansas City Film Critics Circle	1979	Best Supporting Actor	James Woods	Won	
National Society of Film Critics	1980	Best Supporting Actor	James Woods	4th place (Note: Tied with James Mason for Murder by Decree.)	
New York Film Critics Circle	1980	Best Supporting Actor	James Woods	3rd place	
