= Karl Hettinger =

Former American police officer

Karl Francis Hettinger (October 29, 1934 – May 4, 1994) was an American police officer of the Los Angeles Police Department from 1958 to 1963. Hettinger formerly served in the United States Marine Corps from 1952 to 1958 and served in the Korean War and Vietnam War. He was known for surviving the "Onion Field" incident, in which he and his partner, Officer Ian Campbell, were kidnapped on the night of March 9, 1963, by criminals Gregory Powell and Jimmy Lee Smith and taken to an onion field near Bakersfield, California where Officer Campbell was fatally shot.

Hettinger's story is depicted in Joseph Wambaugh's 1973 nonfiction book, The Onion Field. The book was adapted into a 1979 feature film of the same name in which Hettinger is portrayed by John Savage.

== Biography ==
Hettinger was born in Los Angeles, California, to Francis and Elsie (Eberley) Hettinger. He had two sisters, Miriam and Eunice. He was raised in Los Angeles. He was married to Helen Beth Davis in Las Vegas, Nevada, on May 1, 1962; they had three children: Laurie, Kurt, and Christine.

On the night of March 9, 1963, Hettinger and his partner, Ian Campbell, pulled over a vehicle driven by Powell and Smith. After both men got out of the vehicle, Powell disarmed Campbell and pointed a gun at his back. Smith and Powell held the officers hostage, and all four of them returned to the vehicle. Campbell was then forced to drive the four of them to an onion field near Bakersfield. When they arrived, the officers were ordered to step out into the field. Powell asked Campbell if he had ever heard of the Lindbergh Law. When Campbell replied, "Yes," Powell shot him. The killing occurred primarily because Powell assumed that the kidnapping of the officers alone already constituted a capital crime under the Lindbergh Law. However, Powell's interpretation was incorrect. Under the Lindbergh Law at that time, kidnapping became a capital crime only if victims were harmed or if a ransom was demanded.

Hettinger managed to escape to a farmhouse, where he called for help. Powell was arrested hours later. Smith was arrested the next day.

According to Pierce Brooks, the officer who investigated the crime, Hettinger suffered from survivor's guilt because of Campbell's death, describing it as a "tremendous guilt complex." In addition, Hettinger was forced to visit squad rooms and publicly admit blame for his lack of courage at the onion field. His experience inspired the controversial "Hettinger Memorandum," whereby officers were admonished never to give up their weapons. Depressed and finding it difficult to function, Hettinger was transferred to a less stressful job as a driver for the police chief. After he began shoplifting, Hettinger was forced to resign from the police department.

Joseph Wambaugh said of Hettinger after writing both the book and the film about the "Onion Field" incident, "Karl minded terribly, but I just exploited him. I used money as my weapon to get the story. I offered him money that, for the sake of his family, he couldn't refuse. I acted that way because I thought the story was more important than Karl Hettinger, more important than me -- that it was a story so important that I would have done almost anything to get it written."

In 1985, Hettinger spoke for the first time about the incident: "I still get uneasy. I still can't sleep very well. I can still see their faces. I want to stop him (Powell) from getting back on the street. I know this man." That same year, Hettinger strongly opposed parole for Powell. Hettinger said, "I'm speaking as a victim. A very good friend of mine was murdered, and the same men tried to murder me. But the death penalty was not carried out. I don't think it's right. I've been quiet too long."

In 1987, Hettinger was appointed by California Governor George Deukmejian to the Kern County Board of Supervisors until 1993.

Hettinger died on May 4, 1994 at a hospital in Bakersfield. He was 59. The cause of death was liver failure.

== See also ==
- List of kidnappings (1960–1969)
