= Franklyn Seales =

American actor (1952–1990)

- Born: Franklyn Vincent Ellison Seales; July 15, 1952; Calliaqua, St. Vincent, West Indies
- Died: May 14, 1990 (aged 37); New York City, U.S.
- Education: Juilliard School (BFA)
- Occupation: Actor
- Years active: 1974–1989
- Website: www.franklynsealesartwork.com

Franklyn Vincent Ellison Seales (July 15, 1952 – May 14, 1990) was an American film, television and stage actor. He was known for his portrayals of business manager Dexter Stuffins in the 1980s sitcom Silver Spoons, and real-life convicted cop killer Jimmy Lee (Youngblood) Smith in the 1979 film The Onion Field.

== Early life and education ==
Seales was born on July 15, 1952, the fifth of eight siblings, in Calliaqua to Francis Seales, a merchant seaman and government employee, and Olive Seales (née Allen), a homemaker. Seales was of English, Scottish, African, Portuguese and Native Caribbean descent. He and his family left the West Indies in 1960 and settled in New York City. He attended Lincoln High School in Brooklyn.

Seales originally intended to study at the Pratt Institute to pursue a career in art. However, in the early 1970s, Seales agreed to accompany an aspiring-actress friend to an audition at the Juilliard School. As Seales helped his friend run through the famous Romeo and Juliet balcony scene, actor/producer John Houseman (then director and founder of the school's drama division) began to notice him. Houseman offered Seales a four-year Juilliard scholarship. Seales was the first and only known graduate of Juilliard to hail from St. Vincent. He studied at Houseman's Acting Company.

== Career ==
Seales made his breakthrough in 1978 with the PBS drama, Trial of the Moke, portraying Lt. Henry O. Flipper, the first African-American graduate of West Point. He went on to appear in The Onion Field (1979), in which he portrayed real-life convicted cop killer Jimmy Lee (Youngblood) Smith. That same year, he also had a minor role in Star Trek: The Motion Picture. He appeared in the 1981 film, Southern Comfort, in which he portrayed Rifleman Cleotis Simms.

He came to do other television and became a regular on Silver Spoons (which also starred Houseman), a situation comedy of the early 1980s in which he portrayed Dexter Stuffins from 1983 to 1987. He appeared on episodes of Hill Street Blues and Amen.

In Los Angeles, Seales joined L.A. Theatre Works and was seen in such unconventional productions as Conversation at Night With a Despised Character, in which Los Angeles Times critic Lawrence Christon found him "one of America's most compelling stage actors."

He was the Last Person on Earth in Sade-Sack, or How to Live After the Asprocalisp, and he starred in Bertolt Brecht's The Caucasian Chalk Circle. Working primarily in the experimental Equity Waiver theaters of L.A.'s Westside, Seales was seen in No Place to Be Somebody, as "Hamlet" in the Charles Marowitz drama, in Babbitt and Oh Dad Poor Dad.

Despite his talent some of the roles he most wanted sometimes eluded him. "Either I'm not black enough or I look too Hispanic or Cuban", he said in one of his last interviews in 1988. "I have to be hired by someone who knows my work." His last major triumph was at the Mark Taper Forum in October 1988, in Nothing Sacred, an adaptation of Ivan Turgenev's novel Fathers and Sons. Along with acting, Seales was a painter.

== Personal life and death ==
According to Walter Hill, the director of Southern Comfort, Seales was gay.

Seales started noticing symptoms of AIDS-related illness (in particular a persistent cough) on the set of Amen and had been unable to work regularly for the last couple years of his life.

On May 14, 1990, Seales died at age 37 from complications of AIDS at his family's residence in Brooklyn. He was cremated and his ashes were scattered in the Caribbean Sea.

== Filmography ==
Year	Title	Role	Notes
1974	Great Performances	Servant to Cornwall	Episode: "King Lear"
1978	The Trial of the Moke	Lt. Henry O. Flipper	Television movie
1979	The Onion Field	Jimmy Lee "Youngblood" Smith	
1979	Star Trek: The Motion Picture	Crew Member No. 5	
1980	Beulah Land	Roman	Miniseries
1981	Southern Comfort	Pfc. Simms	
1981	Macbeth	Lennox	Direct-to-video release
1982	High Five	Wilson Porter	Television movie
1982	Hill Street Blues	Crawford	3 episodes
1983	The Taming of the Shrew	Petruchio	Direct-to-video release
1983–1987	Silver Spoons	Dexter Stuffins	89 episodes
1986–1987	Amen	Lorenzo Hollingsworth	5 episodes
1987	Growing Pains	Dr. Jerry Marquez	Episode: "This Is Your Life"
1988	Wiseguy	Paco Bazos	Episode: "Fascination for the Flame"
1989	Santa Barbara	William Klein	3 episodes
1989	The Smurfs	Additional Voices	Episode: "Smurfs That Time Forgot" (Part 1 & 2)
