= Jimmy Lee Smith =

American criminal (1931–2007)

Jimmy Lee Smith (January 30, 1931 – April 6, 2007), also known as Youngblood, was an American criminal who assisted Gregory Powell with the kidnapping of Los Angeles Police Department officers Ian Campbell and Karl Francis Hettinger on the night of March 9, 1963. There, Smith and Powell took Campbell and Hettinger to an onion field near Bakersfield, California, where Campbell was fatally shot. Notoriously known as one of the "Onion Field" killers, Smith's story was depicted in Joseph Wambaugh's 1973 nonfiction book The Onion Field. The book was adapted into a 1979 feature film of the same name in which Smith was portrayed by Franklyn Seales.

== Biography ==
Smith was born in Texas to an unmarried teenage mother who abandoned him. He was raised by either his maternal great-aunt or his maternal grandmother. His great-aunt was partially disabled after accidentally shooting herself in the leg with a .45 caliber pistol. Smith had been abused by his stepfather. At age 16, he ran away to Los Angeles, where he was sent to Juvenile Hall on burglary. By age 20, he was the father of two illegitimate children, neither of whom he supported.

In 1950 he was arrested for burglary, then again for narcotics possession. In 1952, he was arrested again for burglary, convicted for it and got sent to San Quentin State Prison. He was released from prison but he violated parole afterwards. In 1959, he was arrested for narcotics possession under the alias "James Youngblood." By February 1963, two weeks before Campbell's murder, Smith was paroled.

On March 9, 1963, around 10:00 PM, LAPD Officers Campbell and Hettinger pulled over a 1946 Ford coupe with Nevada license plates. The car contained both Smith and Powell, with the latter serving as the driver. Smith and Powell were pulled for making an illegal U turn and having a broken license plate light. After they got pulled over, Powell pulled a gun at Campbell and disarmed him. Threatening to kill Campbell, Powell ordered Hettinger to disarm his weapon. Hettinger reluctantly did so after Campbell told him to do so. Powell then forced the officers into his car. Smith kept the officers covered while Powell drove them to an onion field in Kern County. Powell and Smith initially promised to release the officers.

Once they arrived at the onion field, Powell asked Campbell if he heard of the Little Lindbergh Law. When Campbell replied yes, Powell shot him in the mouth. After Campbell fell to the ground, he was shot four more times; it is unclear who fired the four remaining shots. Powell always said that the four other bullets were fired by Smith, who denied it. Hettinger managed to escape from Smith and Powell; as Powell fired at him, Hettinger ran for his life for four miles to a farmhouse, where he called for help.

After Hettinger escaped, Powell and Smith split up: Powell stole a 1957 Plymouth and attempted to drive back to Los Angeles; Smith headed to Bakersfield. Powell was then apprehended a couple of hours later. Smith was arrested the next day at a rooming house in Bakersfield. At the time of his arrest, Smith was unarmed and washing his clothes in the communal bathroom.

On September 4, 1963, Smith was convicted of first degree murder. He was originally sentenced to death, but the sentence was reduced to life in prison in 1970s, when the California Supreme Court outlawed the death penalty. In 1982, Smith was officially paroled despite public outrage. Nevertheless, Smith spent the last twenty-five years of his life in and out of prison.

Four months after his 1982 parole, Smith failed a drug test and was returned to prison. After serving six months, he was paroled again, only to be rearrested in Long Beach on drug charges. He later pleaded guilty to two counts of selling heroin and was sentenced to five years in prison. He was released in 1986, then arrested in Burbank in 1987 and convicted of driving while under the influence of a narcotic.

In 1989, on parole again, he was arrested for terrorizing a woman he held captive over a weekend in West Covina. In 1990, yet again on parole, he was arrested in Van Nuys for threatening a man with a knife. He was arrested again in 1995 for selling drug.

Smith died on April 6, 2007, at the age of 76 at the Peter J. Pitchess Detention Center in Castaic, California, where he was being held for failing to report to a parole officer. The cause of death was a heart attack.
