= Gregory Powell (murderer) =

Accomplice in The Onion Field murder

Gregory Ulas Powell
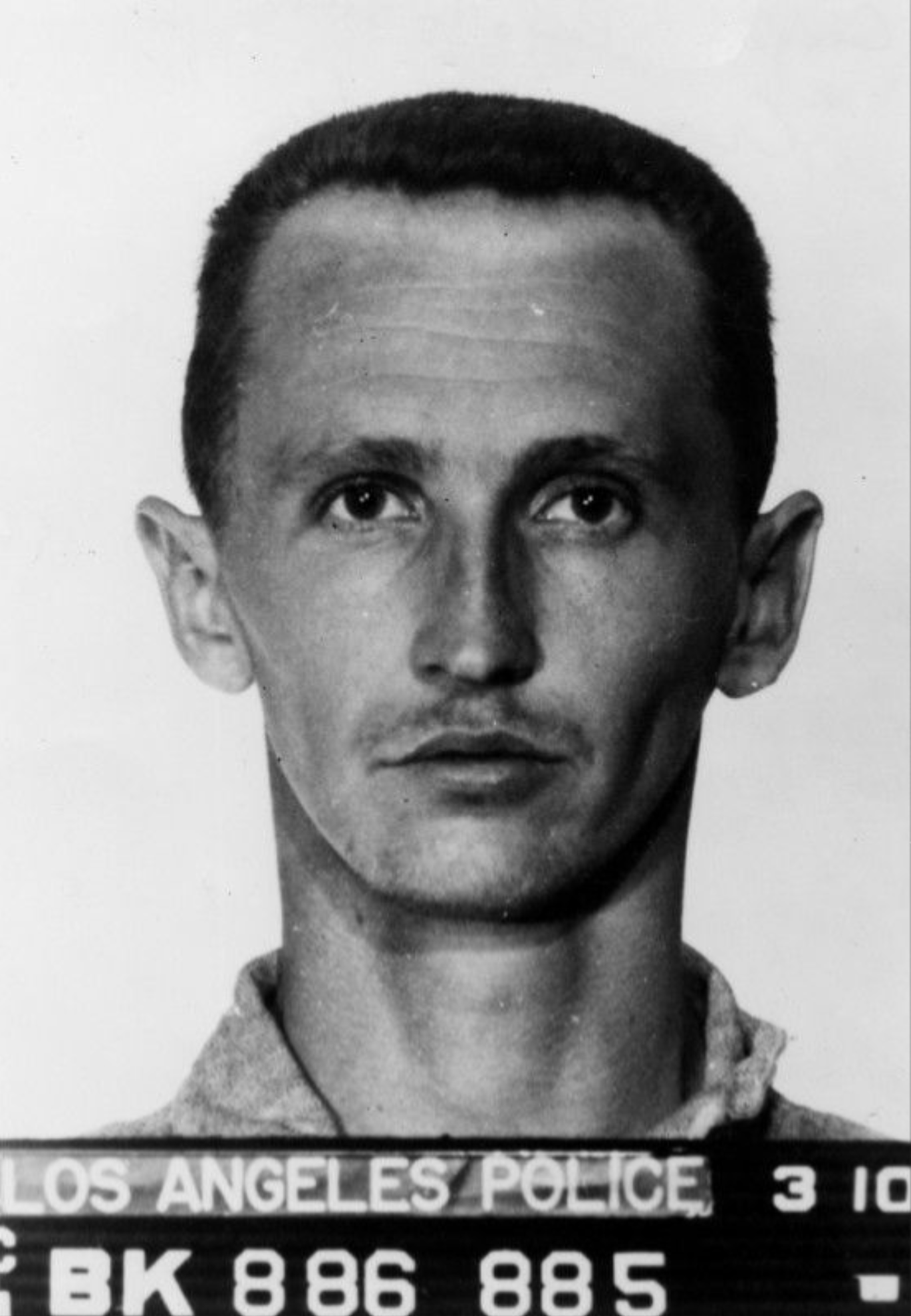
- Powell in a 1963 police mugshot
- Born: August 2, 1933; Michigan, U.S.
- Died: August 12, 2012 (aged 79); Vacaville, California, U.S.
- Status: Deceased
- Conviction: First degree murder
- Penalty: Death; commuted to life imprisonment

Details
- Victims: Ian Campbell, 39
- Date: March 9, 1963
- Country: United States
- State: California

Gregory Ulas Powell (August 2, 1933 – August 12, 2012) was an American criminal who kidnapped Karl Hettinger and Ian Campbell, two officers from the Los Angeles Police Department (LAPD), on the night of March 9, 1963. Assisted by accomplice Jimmy Lee Smith, Powell took the officers to an onion field near Bakersfield, California, where Campbell was fatally shot.

Infamously known as the "Onion Field" Killer, Powell's story was depicted in Joseph Wambaugh's 1973 non-fiction book, The Onion Field. The book was later adapted into a 1979 film of the same name, in which Powell was portrayed by James Woods.

== Early life ==
Gregory Powell was raised in Michigan by a dysfunctional family. His father Robert Powell was often absent due to his career as a musician and his mother had health problems, leaving Powell to take care of his three younger siblings. At age 15, Powell ran away from his home and hitchhiked to Florida, where he met a Catholic priest and they had a brief sexual relationship. At age 16, Powell stole money and a car from his sister; he stole another car when he was aged 18. Powell served time in Michigan for car theft, and was released from prison at age 20.

At one point in his life, after he and his family moved to California where his father Robert took a music teacher position in the Carlsbad School District, Powell underwent a craniectomy or craniotomy at Vacaville Medical Facility to remove a brain tumor. He continued to find himself in and out of prison; by the time he was 29 years old, ten of the previous thirteen years of his life had been spent behind bars. After he was paroled in May 1962, Powell often robbed liquor stores. He also worked as a gay hustler. As of January 1963, Powell had been responsible for a series of armed robberies in Las Vegas. At the time of the double-kidnapping he was residing in Boulder City, Nevada.

== Kidnapping of Campbell and Hettinger ==
At about 10:00 p.m. on March 9, 1963, Los Angeles Police Department (LAPD) officers Ian Campbell and Karl Hettinger pulled over a 1946 Ford coupe at the corner of Carlos Avenue and Gower Street for an illegal U-turn. Present in the vehicle were Powell and his accomplice, Jimmy Lee Smith. According to Powell, "...when the officers stopped our car, we had our guns ready." After Powell was ordered to get out of the car, he disarmed Campbell by pointing a gun at his head and threatening to kill him. Hettinger did not put down his gun until Campbell told him to. With Smith's help, Powell abducted both of the officers and forced Campbell to drive them to an onion field in Bakersfield, California.

=== Murder of Campbell and arrest ===
When they arrived at the onion field, Campbell and Hettinger were forced out of the car and ordered to stand with their hands above their heads. Powell asked Campbell, "Have you ever heard of the Little Lindbergh Law?" After Campbell replied, "Yes," he was shot in the mouth. Hettinger later told the Los Angeles Times, "I knew I was next. I turned away and ran down the road. When I looked back, they fired at me...." Hettinger successfully managed to escape from Powell and Smith, running four miles (6.4 km) to a farmhouse.

It is believed that four other bullets that hit Campbell's chest were fired by both Smith and Powell. However, Powell claimed that Smith fired these shots whereas the latter claimed the former fired them. Powell was arrested a few hours later by a California Highway Patrol officer after attempting to escape via a stolen car. Although he was armed at the time of his arrest, Powell showed no resistance. Smith was arrested the next day.

== Conviction and imprisonment ==
On September 4, 1963, Powell was convicted of the kidnapping of Campbell and Hettinger and of the murder of the former. He was sentenced to death in November that same year.

=== Retrial and escape attempts ===
In July 1967, Powell was granted a second trial; once again, he was convicted and sentenced to death. Later that year, Powell unsuccessfully attempted to escape from San Quentin State Prison with three other inmates. In 1968, he attempted to smuggle guns into the Los Angeles County Jail, and in 1969 he attempted to escape its recreation room.

=== Death sentence commutation ===
By 1972, Powell's sentence was commuted to life in prison when the State of California declared the death penalty unconstitutional.

=== Parole denied ===
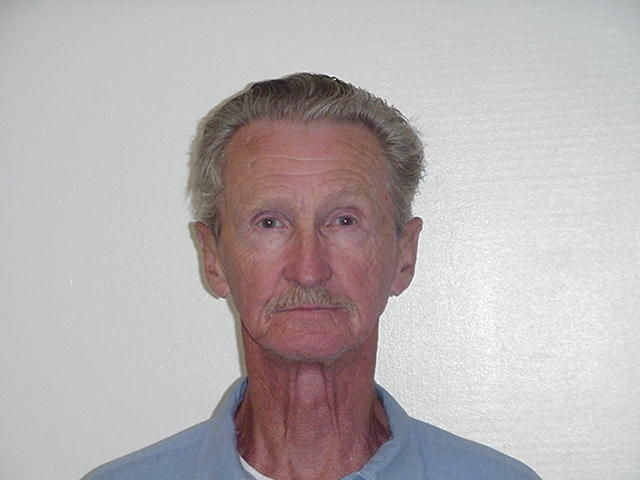
Powell in an undated prison photograph

Powell was originally scheduled for parole on June 13, 1982. A petition submitted by the group Citizens for Truth in Justice garnered 31,500 signatures protesting against parole, which led to the rescission of Powell's parole date. The group was assisted in its effort by Ian Campbell's daughter Valerie. Powell was able to obtain an order of release from Solano County Superior Court Judge Ellis Randall. However, John Mancino, founder of Citizens for Truth, was able to submit a legal brief to the First District Court of Appeals in San Francisco ordering Powell to remain in prison. The case then went to the California Supreme Court, where Mancino and his group prevailed.

California Governors George Deukmejian and Jerry Brown were against Powell being released. His lawyer, Dennis Riordan, blamed their court loss on a February 1982 television airing of The Onion Field, the film adaptation of Joseph Wambaugh's book on the case of the same name. Between 1982 and 2010, Powell had been denied parole eleven times.

Powell worked as a clerk in the law library at the Mule Creek State Prison in Ione, California. By 1994 he was incarcerated at Deuel Vocational Institution. In 2011, Powell was denied compassionate release despite a diagnosis of terminal prostate cancer.

== Reaction to The Onion Field ==
Joseph Wambaugh, author of The Onion Field, interviewed Powell while he was in prison. According to Wambaugh, Powell had only one complaint about the book, "that he [Powell] thought he was more physically attractive than I portrayed him to be." Wambaugh also confirmed that one of Powell's lawyers claimed he would have been released from prison had it not been for the book or its film adaptation.

=== Media portrayal ===
Powell was portrayed by actor James Woods in the 1979 film The Onion Field. Woods did not meet with Powell when preparing for his role. He was nominated for a Golden Globe for his performance in the film.

== Death ==
On August 12, 2012, Powell died of prostate cancer at the California Medical Facility in Vacaville, California. He was 79 years old. His death occurred two days after a Hollywood intersection was dedicated in Officer Ian Campbell's name. Tyler Izen, president of the Los Angeles Police Protective League, issued a statement: "Gregory Powell was a cold-blooded murderer who avoided the death penalty, but he won't escape God's judgment. While Officer Ian Campbell can never be brought back, nor the damage and heartache caused by Powell and Smith be undone, justice was upheld when the parole board denied Powell's request for compassionate release and ensured he drew his last breath while confined behind prison bars."
