= John Leonard Orr =

American fire investigator and arsonist

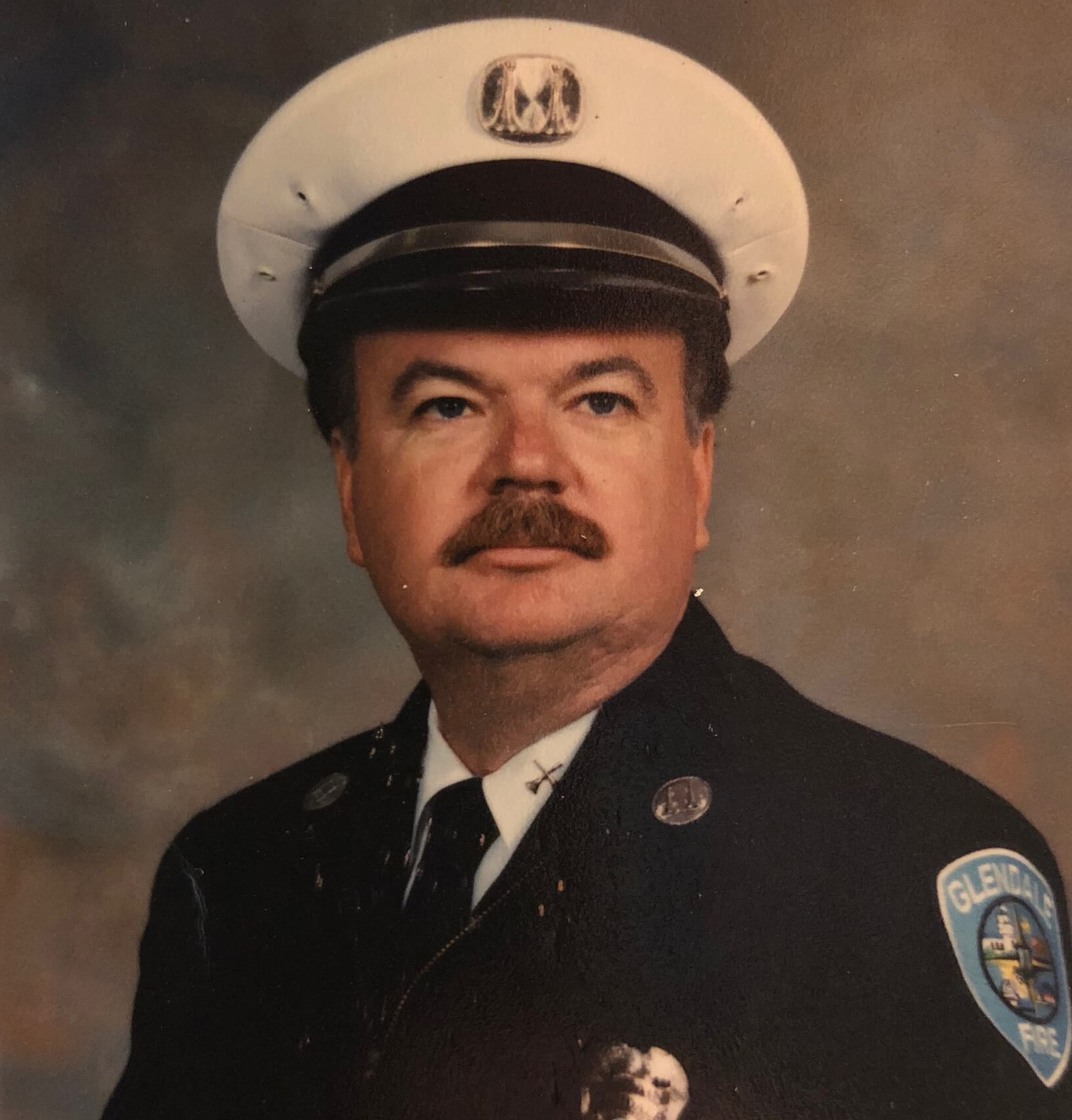
- Orr in uniform with the Glendale fire department
- Born: April 26, 1949 (age 77); Glendale, California, U.S.
- Other names: The Pillow Pyro; Coin Tosser; The Frito Bandito
- Occupations: Firefighter; arson investigator
- Style: Tool-assisted arson
- Status: Federal: Transferred to California custody in 2002; State: Incarcerated at Mule Creek State Prison
- Convictions: Federal: July 31, 1992; State: June 25, 1998
- Criminal charges: Federal: Arson; State: First-degree murder, arson
- Penalty: Federal: 30 years; State: Life (no parole) plus 21 years (nine years vacated on March 15, 2000)

Details
- Victims: 4 (fatal)
- Date: October 10, 1984
- Country: United States
- State: California
- Location: Pasadena
- Weapon: Incendiary timing-device
- Date apprehended: December 4, 1991
- Imprisoned at: Mule Creek State Prison

John Leonard Orr (born April 26, 1949) is an American convicted serial arsonist, mass murderer and former firefighter. A fire captain and arson investigator in Glendale, California, Orr was convicted of serial arson and four counts of murder; he is believed to have set nearly 2,000 fires in a 30-year arson spree, most of them between 1984 and 1991, making him the most prolific serial arsonist in U.S. history.

During his arson spree, Orr had several nicknames: the Pillow Pyro due to the location of the fires inside retail stores; the Frito Bandito, due to starting some of his fires using potato chips; and the Coin Tosser for incorporating coins into his incendiary devices. Orr's modus operandi was to set fires using a timed device, usually comprising a lit cigarette with three matches wrapped in ruled yellow writing paper and secured by a rubber band, in stores while they were open and populated. He would also set small fires in the grassy hills in order to distract firefighters, leaving fires set in more congested areas unattended. He would sometimes be part of the firefighting crew that investigated the fires.

== Early life ==
Orr was born in Glendale, California, and grew up in a family of three children in the Highland Park neighborhood of Los Angeles. His father Joe was a machinist, and his mother Leora was a secretary. His parents divorced when he was young. As a child, Orr was enthralled by two neighborhood fires that were extinguished by the Los Angeles Fire Department.

Orr attended Eagle Rock High School before joining the United States Air Force at age 17. During his enlistment he married his high school sweetheart Jody. After being discharged from the military in 1971, he sought employment in the Los Angeles Police Department but failed the psychological exam, and the Los Angeles Fire Department found him physically unfit. Orr studied fire science while working day jobs, and in 1974 he secured employment with the Glendale Fire Department, one of the lowest paying departments in Los Angeles County. Orr rose through the ranks as an arson investigator, attaining the rank of captain.

== 1984 South Pasadena fire ==
On October 10, 1984, in South Pasadena, California, a major fire broke out at an Ole's Home Center hardware store. The store was completely destroyed by the fire, and four people were killed: Matthew Troidl, a two-year-old child; Ada Deal, Matthew's 50-year-old grandmother; Carolyn Kraus, a 26-year-old mother of two; and Jimmy Cetina, a 17-year-old employee. The following day, fire investigators from around Southern California converged on the destroyed store, and declared the cause to be an electrical fire. However, Orr insisted that the cause was arson. It has since been speculated that Orr wanted his work to be recognized. Investigations showed that the fire was deliberately started in highly flammable polyurethane products, which caught fire very quickly, causing the fire to flashover very rapidly.

== Investigation ==
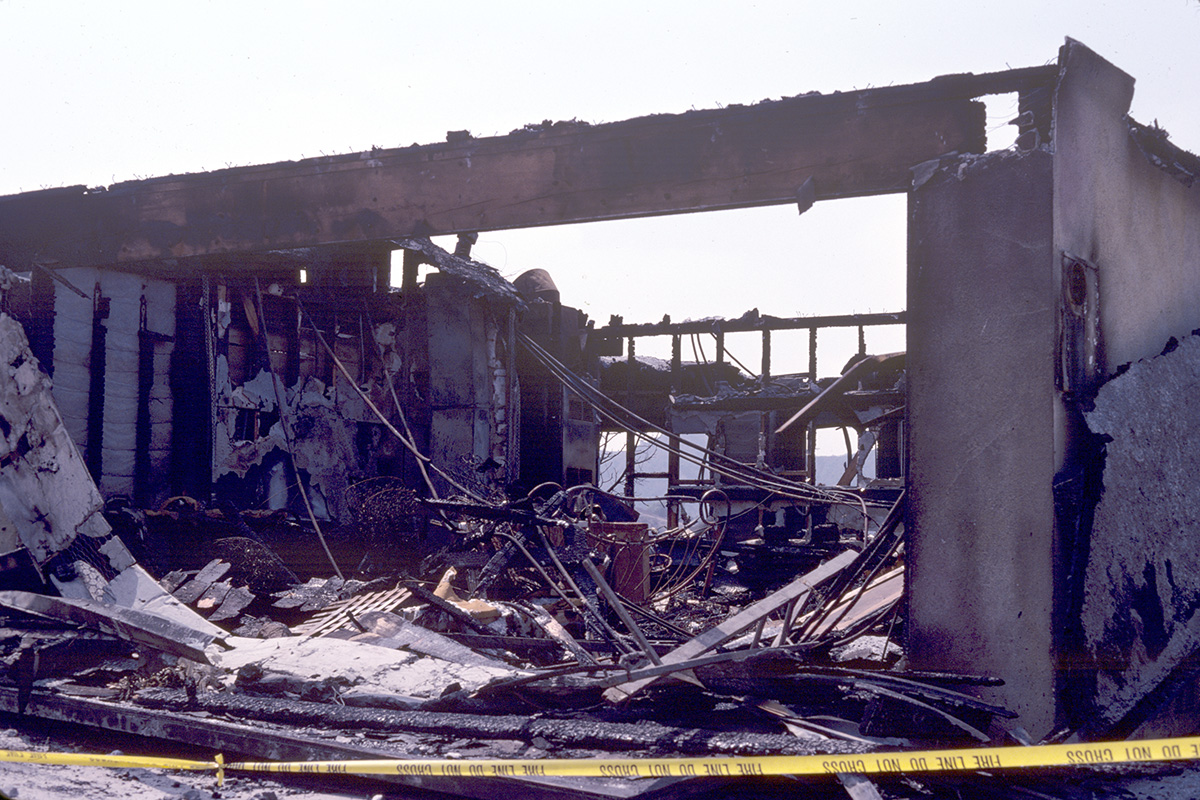
Home in Glendale destroyed by fire started by Orr in 1990

In January 1987, a convention for fire investigators from California was held in the city of Fresno. During and after the convention, several suspicious fires were set in Bakersfield. This, combined with the recovery of a single unmatched fingerprint left on a piece of notebook paper as part of a time-delay incendiary device, led Captain Marvin G. Casey of the Bakersfield Fire Department (BFD) to suspect that a fire investigator from the Los Angeles metropolitan area was responsible for the arsons.

During March 1989, another series of arsons were committed along the California coast in close conjunction with a conference of fire investigators in Pacific Grove. By comparing the list of attendees from the Fresno conference with the list of attendees at the Pacific Grove conference, Casey was able to create a short list of ten suspects. Orr was on Casey's short list, but everyone on this short list was cleared of suspicion when their fingerprints were compared with the fingerprint that Casey had recovered from the piece of notebook paper found at one of the arson crime scenes. Orr's fingerprint did not match.

In late 1990 and early 1991, another series of arson fires broke out in Southern California, this time in and around the Los Angeles area. As a result, a large task force, nicknamed the "Pillow Pyro Task Force" was formed to apprehend the arsonist. On March 29, 1991, Tom Campuzanno of the Los Angeles Arson Task Force circulated a flier at a meeting of the Fire Investigators Regional Strike Team (FIRST), an organization formed by a group of smaller cities in and around Los Angeles County that did not have their own staff of arson investigators. The flier described the modus operandi of the suspected serial arsonist in the Los Angeles area. Scott Baker of the California State Fire Marshal's Office was at that meeting, and told Campuzanno about the series of arsons investigated by Casey and about Casey's suspicions that the perpetrator was a fire investigator from the Los Angeles area. Consequently, Campuzanno and two of his colleagues met with Casey, obtained a copy of the fingerprint that Casey had recovered, and this time matched it to Orr in April 1991, with the help of improved fingerprint technology. By cross-referencing the print with a database of all past applicants for law enforcement posts in Los Angeles County, they discovered that the print was an exact match to Orr's left ring finger.

== Arrest ==
Orr was then investigated and watched for several months. Authorities hid a tracking device in his personal vehicle. While leaving a May 1991 fire conference in San Luis Obispo, California, he discovered the tracking device. Orr rushed to a nearby police explosives range, thinking it was a bomb. The police were alerted by FIRST, and Orr was told that the device was a hoax. Orr was never aware of a second tracking device installed in his city vehicle that November. His actions continued to be watched. After Orr was found to be present at another suspicious fire, a federal grand jury handed down an indictment. Orr was arrested on December 4, 1991, and was charged with arson for a series of fires not related to the 1984 South Pasadena Ole's fire.

After his arrest, fire investigators began a forensic re-evaluation of the Ole's fire. They found a detailed description of a similar fire in a novel written by Orr entitled Points of Origin: Playing With Fire, which tells the story of Aaron Stiles, a fireman who is also a serial arsonist, and describes events with striking similarities to the real-life 1984 fire. When questioned, Orr stated the novel is a work of fiction unrelated to any actual events. Orr stated that, "[t]he character [...] was a composite of arsonists I arrested."

== Trials and convictions ==
Among those who covered the trial was award-winning journalist Frank Girardot, who would later collaborate with Orr's daughter Lori on a book about the case. After much deliberation, a federal jury in Fresno convicted Orr on July 31, 1992, of three counts of arson, while acquitting him on two other counts. Federal Judge Oliver Wanger sentenced Orr to 30 years in prison. A federal appeals court affirmed his conviction in 1994. Orr maintains his innocence, notwithstanding his subsequent guilty plea on March 24, 1993, to three more counts of arson in Los Angeles after reaching a plea agreement that saw him paroled from federal prison in 2002. He took the plea deal when it became apparent that he could not afford to mount a defense and stood little chance at trial.

By November 21, 1994, state prosecutors in Los Angeles indicted Orr on four counts of first-degree murder with special circumstances and 21 counts of arson for a string of fires stretching from 1984 to 1990. The lead prosecutor on the case, Mike Cabral, opted to seek the death penalty in order to ensure that Orr would spend the rest of his life in prison. He made an off-the-record offer to Orr: if Orr accepted a sentence of life without parole and confessed all of his acts of arson in open court dating to his youth, Cabral would take the death penalty off the table. Orr turned the offer down out of hand.

A jury in a California state court convicted Orr on all four murder charges and all but one of the arson counts on June 25, 1998. That arson count, for setting a fire in the Warner Bros. backlot, was subsequently dismissed at the request of the prosecution. When asked to sentence Orr to the death penalty, the same jury split eight to four in favor. The presiding judge sentenced Orr to four concurrent terms of life without parole for murder, plus an additional 21 years in prison for arson. The state sentence ran consecutively with his federal sentence for arson.

A California appeals court vacated nine years of his state sentence on March 15, 2000, finding that the burning of homes in the College Hills blaze had been only incidental to his objective of starting a brush fire. It left the remainder of the sentence untouched. Orr began his state sentence upon his release from federal custody in 2002. Orr is currently serving his life sentence at Mule Creek State Prison in Ione, California.

== Aftermath ==
Some fire investigators and an FBI criminal profiler have deemed Orr to be possibly one of the worst American serial arsonists of the 20th century. Federal ATF agent Mike Matassa believes that Orr set nearly 2,000 fires between 1984 and 1991. Furthermore, arson investigators determined that after Orr was arrested, the number of brush fires in the nearby foothill areas decreased by more than 90 percent.

Orr's daughter Lori, who later became a motivational speaker, testified on behalf of the defense at the trial. Her testimony prevented him from receiving the death penalty. After maintaining her father's innocence for years, she eventually came to believe he was guilty and broke off all contact with him.

As part of Hamilton College's prison-writing initiative, the American Prison Writing Archive, Orr was able to publish several autobiographical accounts of his experiences as a prisoner in the American prison complex.

Aaron Farinacci, accused instigator of the August 2026 Spokane Complex Fire, had researched Orr and his methods.

== In media ==
Orr's story was chronicled by author Joseph Wambaugh in his 2002 true crime book Fire Lover: A True Story. True crime author Frank Girardot collaborated with Orr's daughter Lori Kovach in writing Burned: Pyromania, Murder, and a Daughter's Nightmare in 2018.

Orr's crimes have been profiled on several television series, including: Nova (1995), Cold Case Files (1999), Forensic Files (2004), Deadly Secrets (2019), and Very Scary People (2021). The Apple TV+ series Smoke (2025) was inspired by Orr. Point of Origin, a film starring Ray Liotta as Orr, was released by HBO in 2002.

In July 2021, truth.media released the true crime podcast Firebug, hosted by filmmaker Kary Antholis and chronicling the investigation into the fires through interviews and excerpts from Orr's manuscript. An episode of the Casefile true crime podcast centers around Orr, as does the Criminalia podcast episode "Firefighter Firebugs."

== See also ==
- Firefighter arson
