= Ponet Square Hotel and Apartments fire =

1970 multi-fatality fire in Los Angeles

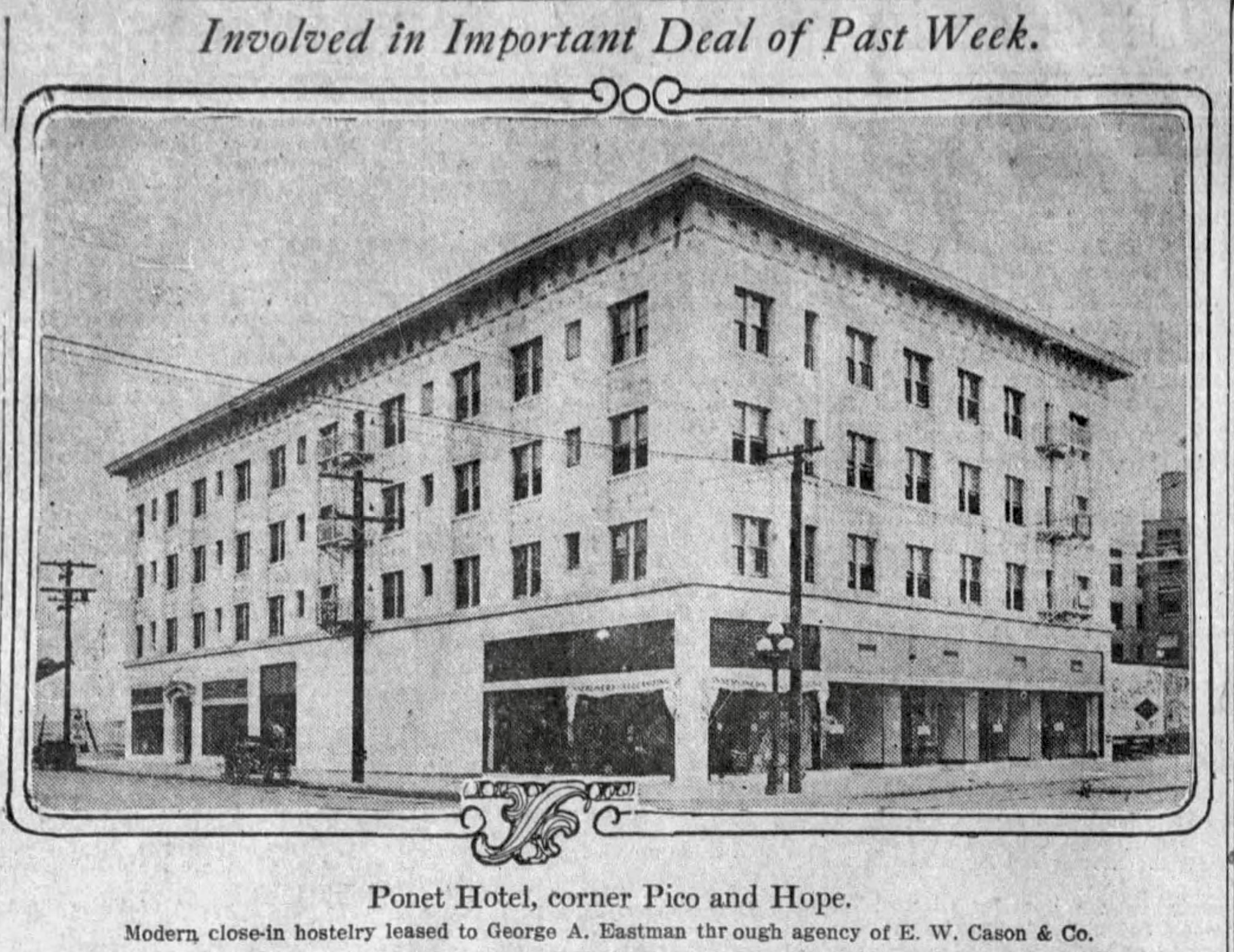
- Ponet Hotel, 1914
- Date: September 13, 1970
- Location: 1249 S. Grand Avenue, Los Angeles, California, U.S.
- Perpetrator: Alejandro Castro Figueroa
- Deaths: 19
- Injuries: 50+

The Ponet Square Hotel and Apartments fire was a 1970 multiple-fatality building fire in Los Angeles, California. The fire broke out before dawn on Sunday, September 13, 1970, and swept through the four-story, 86-unit building, which had been constructed around 1910. The cause of the fire was arson.

The fire killed 19 of the 100-some residents of the building and led to the creation of the "Ponet fire doors ordinance," a local regulation that buildings of two or more floors have enclosed stairways and heavy doors that could block the spread of a fire for at least an hour. Three years later, the Stratford Apartments building in downtown Los Angeles was in the process of being renovated to comply with the Ponet fire door ordinance when it caught fire, killing 23.

== See also ==
- Dorothy Mae Apartment-Hotel fire
