= Reckless burning =

Controversial waste management strategy

Reckless burning is a crime that involves illegally setting fire to something not of building proportions, such as leaves or trash. It is a lesser charge than arson. It is usually enacted and levied in areas of high fire risk to prevent people from starting fires that could easily get out of control.

== See also ==
- Vandalism
- Pyromania
