= Detection of fire accelerants =

Forensic technique

Detection of fire accelerants is the process that a fire investigator uses to determine if fire accelerants were used at a fire scene. This process involves a combination of both field work and laboratory analysis by fire investigators and chemists.

In order for a positive identification of a fire accelerant to occur both field work and laboratory analysis must take place. This is because when a fire accelerant is used only ignitable liquid residues (ILRs) remain at the scene. It is the chemist's job to identify these ILRs and the investigators job to determine if they were used as fire accelerants or just present at the scene under normal circumstances.

== Fire accelerant vs. ignitable liquid ==
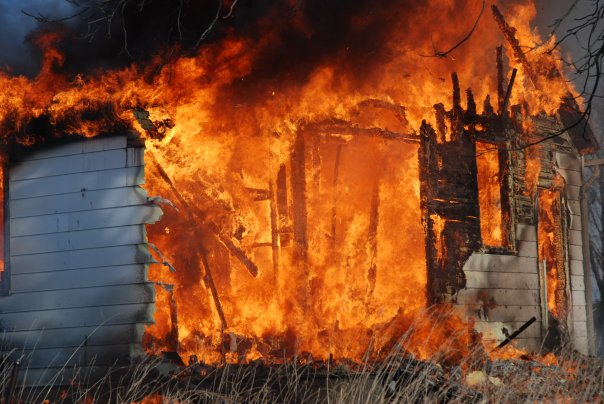
House fire using gasoline as an accelerant

A farmhouse burning after being set on fire using gasoline as a fire accelerant

It is common for the words fire accelerant and ignitable liquid to be used synonymously. An ignitable liquid is a liquid that will readily ignite when exposed to an ignition source, while a fire accelerant is a material that is used to increase the rate of combustion for materials that do not readily burn.

Ignitable liquids are not always fire accelerants, they may just be present at the scene under normal circumstances. Gasoline is the most common fire accelerant used, but it could also be present at a scene as an ignitable liquid due to gasoline being a common fuel. Although ignitable liquids are the most common fire accelerants, other chemicals such as propane or natural gas could also be used to accelerate a fire.

Detecting the use of a fire accelerant at a crime scene can be the difference between classifying a fire as accidental or as an arson. Once a case is determined to be an arson, the detection of fire accelerants will hold strong evidentiary value which the prosecutor can use during the trial should someone be charged.

== Scene detection ==
Determining the origin of a fire is often one of the first tasks that a fire investigator must complete while at the scene. This is completed because the origin will have the highest probability of containing any ILRs left from the use of fire accelerant. This is logical because accelerants would be the first materials ignited as they have a lower ignition temperature than any other materials. Once the origin is determined the investigators must decide if fire accelerants were used at this scene. Often the first and most common way of determining if accelerants were used is by completing a visual inspection of the scene and specifically the origin. A trained investigator would look for cues like intense localized burning or pour patterns to indicate the use of accelerants.

Accelerant detecting canines can also be used to determine if accelerants were used at a scene and pinpoint the location of use. These canines have been trained to detect trace levels of ILRs and can lead an investigator to an area that will have a high probability of containing ILRs.

Detection with portable hydrocarbon sniffers is a recent method which is more readily being used by investigators. These are handheld electronic devices that sample the vapors at a scene and will give a reading for the concentration of hydrocarbons it is detecting. By comparing the concentration of hydrocarbons in the area to known levels of ILR free areas an investigator will be able to determine if ILRs are present at the scene. They will then take samples from the areas that are showing the highest concentrations.

== Sample selection ==
As in other investigations, part of the investigator's job is to collect evidence from the scene to further the investigation. The samples collected by a fire investigator will be analyzed in a laboratory for the presence of any ILRs which could have been used as accelerants. Samples that are selected from the fire must be those that will have the highest likelihood of containing ILRs so they can ensure the laboratory results are an accurate representation of the scene.

These samples are taken from around the origin and include materials that are highly adsorbent or absorbent, have a high surface area and are porous. These materials have the highest likelihood of containing ILRs as most of the common accelerants used are hydrophobic, so when water suppression occurs, they are trapped and protected from rapid degradation in these porous materials. With this in mind, the most common items collected by investigators are cloth, carpets, cardboard and soils.

== Sample packaging ==
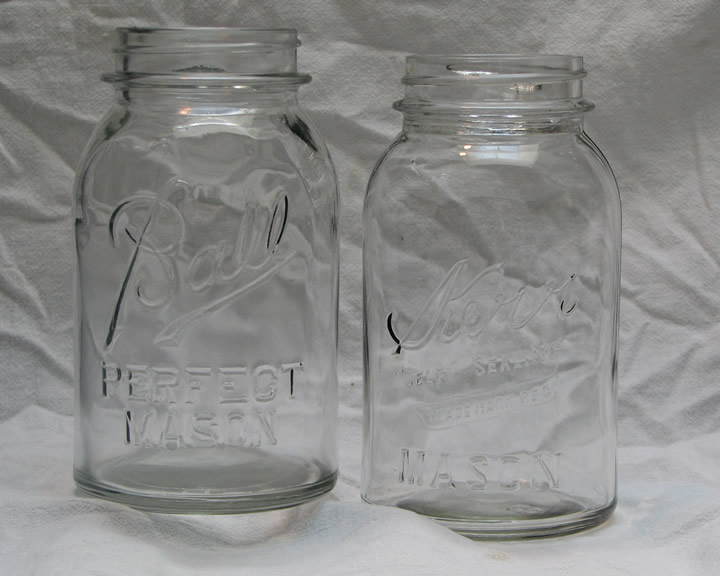
Glass mason jars

Packaging is of the utmost importance for fire debris evidence because improper packaging could lead to the destruction of evidence. Not only do investigators have to worry about the evidence being well documented, but if it is not packaged correctly the ILRs could degrade or become contaminated by other ILRs while being transported to the laboratory. If there was a leak in the packaging, then ILRs from the transportation vehicle could be transferred into the evidence and result in a false positive. Likewise, a leak in the packaging could result in a loss of ILRs which would result in a false negative.

=== Containers ===
There are three containers that are commonly used by investigators to package fire debris evidence: mason jars, paint containers, and nylon bags. Studies have been conducted to determine which container is the most suitable for use in the field. It was found that the glass mason jars had the fastest leak rate while the nylon bags when properly heat sealed had the slowest. The leaks in these containers allow volatile ILRs to escape which will lower the chances of obtaining a positive result from that evidence. Although this is the case all three containers are still used today by various investigators since the losses that do happen are not significant enough to affect the results if the samples are analyzed in a timely manner. In Ontario, Canada the common practice for investigators is to use mason jars to package their evidence and nylon bags for anything which is too large for a mason jar.

== Laboratory analysis ==
Once the samples are properly packaged they are sent back to a laboratory for analysis. This is the point in the process where many agencies could differ in their methodology because there are multiple techniques for analyzing fire debris for the presence of ILRs. Some of the most common methods include solvent extraction, headspace extraction, and adsorption extraction which in itself has at least three varying methods. An adsorption extraction can be accomplished by passive headspace adsorption, passive headspace adsorption using solid-phase microextraction (SPME) or dynamic headspace adsorption, which is the method used by the laboratories in Ontario, Canada. These techniques are all used to extract volatile compounds which could be ILRs from the fire debris so that they can be detected and interpreted.

Once the isolation is complete the volatiles are detected using gas chromatography–mass spectrometry (GC-MS) which will produce a chromatogram that will be interpreted by a fire chemist. The interpretation is completed by comparing the sample chromatograms with chromatograms from known ignitable liquid samples that were analyzed on the same instrument. The chemist will be able to identify the ignitable liquids present in the sample by matching the sample chromatogram to a standard chromatogram that contains the highest degree of similarity. After the analyst has finished interpreting the results they will have one of three conclusions. One could be that ILRs are present, and their identities will be determined (ex. gasoline or Varsol). Another could be that ILRs are absent and the last could be that the sample was inconclusive, and a reanalysis needs to be completed.
