= Point of Origin (film) =

- Directed by: Newton Thomas Sigel
- Music by: John Ottman
- Release date: 2002

Point of Origin is a 2002 biographical crime film released by HBO. It stars Ray Liotta, John Leguizamo, and Colm Feore. The film details an account of the true story of the convicted serial arsonist John Leonard Orr. The film was directed by Newton Thomas Sigel, and the soundtrack for the film was written by John Ottman. The film is named after an autobiographical novel written by Orr which was key to the investigation of his crimes.
