= Fire Lover =

2002 book by Joseph Wambaugh

- Author: Joseph Wambaugh
- Publisher: William Morrow and Company
- Publication date: April 1, 2002
- ISBN: 978-0060095277

Fire Lover: A True Story is a true crime book written by Joseph Wambaugh in 2002, which covers the case of John Leonard Orr, an arson investigator and arsonist convicted in 1993. In 2003, it won a Edgar Award for Best Fact Crime book.
