= Endangerment =

Criminal offense involving conduct that creates a risk of harm to others

Endangerment is a category of criminal law offenses characterized by conduct that creates a significant, unjustified risk of harm to others, even in the absence of actual intention or physical injury. Unlike crimes that require a completed result (such as assault or homicide), endangerment offenses are often "prophylactic" or inchoate in nature; they are designed to prevent harm by criminalizing the underlying reckless or negligent conduct that precedes it. Depending on how serious the behavior is, the legal consequences for endangerment can span the full spectrum from minor misdemeanor charges to major felony counts.

== Legal conceptual framework ==
The legal establishment of endangerment relies on the foundational concurrence of mens rea (the culpable mental state) and actus reus (the prohibited conduct or omission), designed to penalize the unjustified creation of risk independently of whether a harmful result actually materializes.

Regarding the mental element, criminal codes traditionally delineate strict gradations of culpability. At the threshold of misdemeanor or standard reckless offenses lies recklessness, which requires proof that the defendant consciously recognized and deliberately disregarded a unreasonable or unjustifiable risk.

Below this sits criminal negligence, where the actor may not have subjectively perceived the danger, but their failure to recognize a risk that a reasonable person would have foreseen constitutes a gross deviation from the standard of care.

At the apex of these offenses, severe felony-level endangerment often demands a demonstration of depraved indifference to human life. This high threshold requires evidence of a malignant state of mind, showing an utter disregard for the sanctity of human life and a willingness to gamble with the safety of others in a manner that transcends ordinary recklessness.

The physical element, or actus reus, centers on an affirmative act or a culpable omission that generates a concrete state of peril. The gravamen of the offense is the "heedless nature" of the behavior rather than any resulting damage. Because endangerment functions fundamentally as an inchoate or prophylactic mechanism within criminal jurisprudence, statutory frameworks relieve the prosecution of the burden of proving actual injury, physical contact, or property destruction. Instead, the legal inquiry focuses entirely on ex-ante risk: whether the defendant's conduct created an imminent, substantial, and legally intolerable jeopardy to the rights or safety of others at the moment the act was committed.

In the U.S., endangerment can range from a misdemeanor to a felony. For example, the New York Penal Code §120.20 defines reckless endangerment in the second degree (class A misdemeanor) as conduct that "creates a substantial serious risk of injury to another person", and §120.25 deals with reckless endangerment in the first degree (class D felony), which is conduct that shows a "depraved indifference to human life" and "creates a grave risk of death to another person". In addition, §145.25 codifies reckless endangerment to property as a class B misdemeanor.

== Categories of endangerment ==
Endangerment statutes are typically applied in several distinct context:

- Interpersonal endangerment: Covers situations where an individual's actions, behavior, or negligence place another person at significant risk of physical, emotional, or psychological harm, such as child endangerment or domestic-related reckless behavior. Unlike intentional abuse or assault, endangerment often focuses on the creation of a dangerous environment or reckless or negligent disregard for someone else's safety, even if the primary intent was not to cause injury. (eg. driving under the influence with a child in the car).
- Public endangerment: Statutes addressing actions that threaten large numbers of people or infrastructure, such as environmental contamination, tampering with public utilities, or dangerous conduct at large public gatherings (eg. discharging a firearm in a populated area).
- Occupational and safety endangerment: Laws holding employers or individuals accountable for maintaining unsafe environments that place employees or the public at risk of death or grievous bodily harm (eg. disabling a machine's safety guard to speed up production).

=== Continental European systems ===
In contrast to common law jurisdictions that rely primarily on generalized statutes like reckless endangerment, many civil law systems —notably those of Germany (Strafgesetzbuch) and France (Code pénal)— employ a highly refined doctrinal framework that separates offenses based on the proximity and provability of the risk created.

- Concrete endangerment (konkrete Gefährdungsdelikte / délits de mise en danger concrète): These offenses occupy a middle ground between conduct crimes and completed harm. To secure a conviction, the prosecution must prove beyond a reasonable doubt that the defendant’s behavior created an actual, immediate, and localized danger to a specific legal object or person. In French law, this is notably anchored in Article 223-1 of the Code pénal (exposition d'autrui à un risque direct de mort ou de blessures), which penalizes the direct exposure of another person to an immediate risk of death or serious injury through a manifest breach of a specific safety obligation, even if no harm materializes. Similarly, German doctrine requires that the threat be close enough that only a fortuitous circumstance prevented actual harm.
- Abstract endangerment (abstrakte Gefährdungsdelikte / infractions formelles): These represent a prophylactic exercise of legislative power designed to protect collective legal interests—such as public traffic safety or environmental integrity—before a tangible threat materializes. The legislature codifies certain conduct as inherently dangerous; consequently, the prosecution does not need to prove that any specific person was actually endangered. This is reflected in German statutes like Section 316 of the Strafgesetzbuch (StGB) (driving under the influence) as well as in French legal classifications of infractions formelles or simple commission (such as illegal possession of weapons or strict traffic safety violations under the Code de la route), where the criminal wrong lies entirely in the execution of the forbidden act itself.

== See also ==
- Criminal negligence
- Culpable and reckless conduct, similar charge to reckless endangerment in Scots law
- Depraved-heart murder
- Manslaughter
- Willful violation
