= Wilful fire raising =

Common law offence under Scots law

Wilful fire-raising is a common law offence under Scots law applicable to deliberately starting fires with intent to cause damage to property.

The offence is not fully equivalent to the offence of arson in England and Wales. The difference is that wilful fire-raising only covers fires that were started deliberately. The English-Welsh offence of arson can include cases where the fire was not entirely deliberate but made possible through malicious or reckless behaviour. In Scots law, if a fire is the result of an act of recklessness, then the offence of culpable and reckless conduct applies. It is common to find both offences charged together where criminal events involve fire and both offences carry a maximum sentence of life imprisonment. In practice, wilful fire-raising is often treated as being equivalent to arson for some purposes such as statistics.

Prior to the case of Byrne v H.M. Advocate (No. 2) there was a distinction between "wilful fire-raising" and "culpable and reckless fire-raising". The former dealt with heritable property (e.g. buildings, trees, crops) while the latter dealt with other property. That case determined that fire-raising (in a criminal context) would be either wilful or reckless (distinct from English statute law which places both together).

== See also ==
- Mike Watson, Baron Watson of Invergowrie, convicted of wilful fire raising at the Scottish Politician of the Year awards in 2004
