= Margaret Clark (arsonist) =

Arsonist executed in 1680

Margaret Clark (died 1680), also known as Margret Clark, was an English servant arrested and executed for the arson of her employer's house in Southwark, London. Her justifications were published posthumously in pamphlet form.

== Early life and career ==
Margaret Clark was born in Croydon, Surrey. She found work as a servant in various houses, and by January 1680 she was serving the family of Peter Delanoy, a prosperous dyer who lived in Southwark, in London.

== Arson ==
On 1 February 1680, the Delanoy family were at their country home in Lee. Three fires were started in the Southwark house; they were put out by local people and Clark was arrested on the night after arousing suspicions by acting strangely. At first, she denied the charge but then quickly admitted arson. She claimed that she had been approached by John Satterthwayt in late January and he had asked her to let him into the house in order to set it on fire. Clark alleged that he had promised to pay her £2,000 (equivalent to £380,000 in 2025). Satterthwayt was arrested the following day on her description. He was a soldier in the Duke of York's guard and initially investigators were suspicious because the duke (later to become James II of England) was Catholic and at the time religious tensions were running high as a result of the Popish Plot.

Clark and Satterthwayt were both detained and stood trial at Kingston assizes on 13 March. Clark was found guilty and sentenced to death. Satterthwayt persuaded the jury that he was Protestant and his fellow soldiers said they were drinking with him in various pubs on the night of the arson, so he was acquitted.

== Death and legacy ==
Clark was put to death by hanging on 22 March 1680. She had declined to ask for a pardon. In her final hours, she was besieged by people asking her why she had done it. As she stood on the scaffold awaiting her execution, Clark announced to the onlookers that she had written a pamphlet arguing her case, claiming that her culpability was limited. This had probably been dictated by her and the high sheriff saw that it was published after her death. The true confession of Margret Clark was followed by a second pamphlet also published in 1680 and entitled Warning for Servants, and a Caution to Protestants. Both texts expanded upon Clark's argument that she had been bribed by Satterthwayt as part of a Catholic plot to burn down London. She declared that "Pride and Sabbath breaking hath been my downfall". Satterthwayt set out his side of the story in A True and Perfect Narrative of the Tryal and Acquitment of Mr. John Satterthwayt.

== See also ==
- Elizabeth Cellier
