= Dorothy Mae Apartment-Hotel fire =

1982 fatal arson, California, U.S.

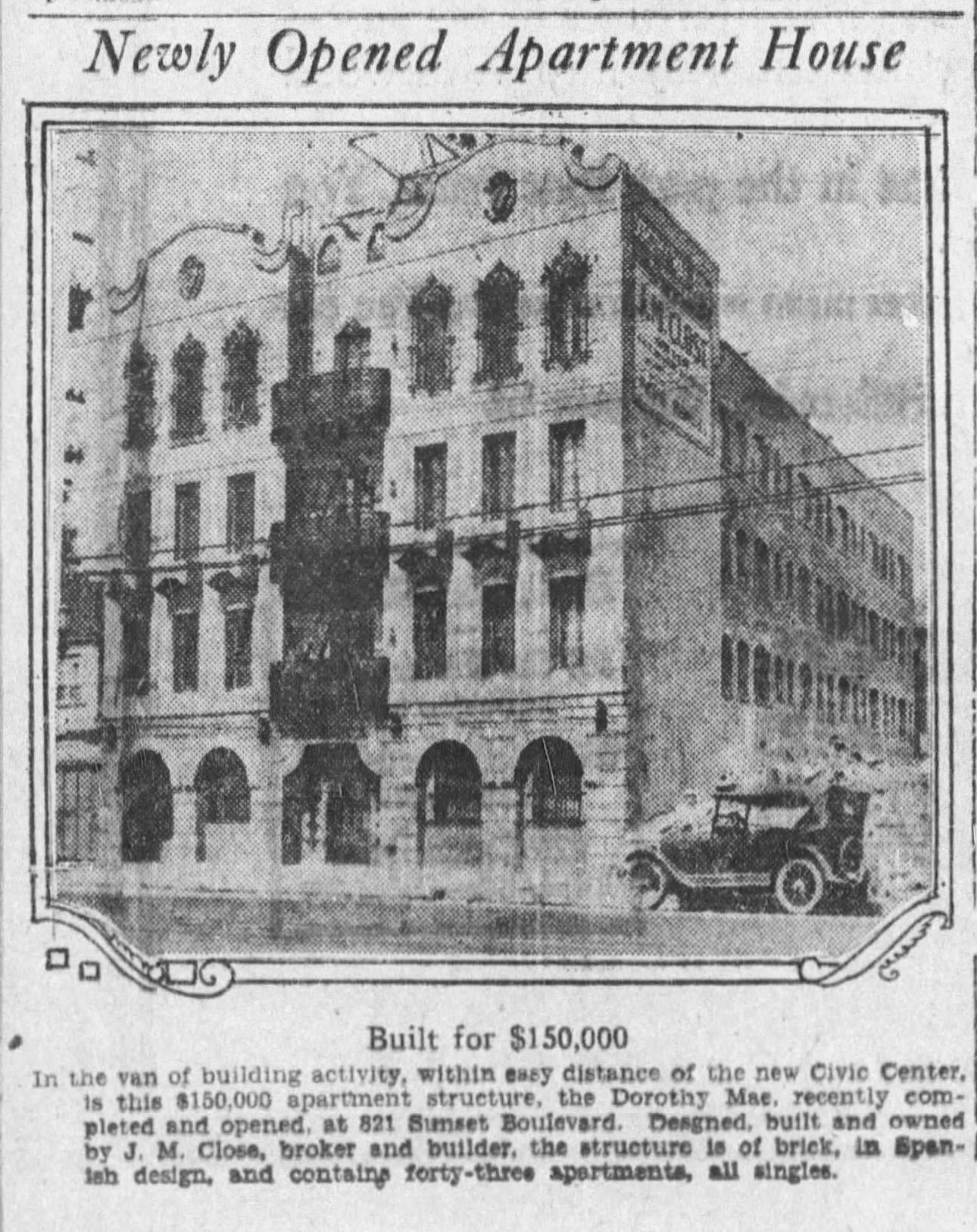
- Dorothy Mae Apartments, Los Angeles Times image, 1927
- Date: September 4, 1982
- Location: 34.0628°N 118.246°W
- Type: Arson fire
- Motive: Revenge
- Perpetrator: Humberto Diaz de la Torre
- Deaths: 25
- Injuries: 30
- Sentence: 625 years

The Dorothy Mae Apartment-Hotel fire was a 1982 arson that killed 25 people and injured 30 others in Los Angeles, California.

Humberto de la Torre started the fire on September 4, 1982 with gasoline and a match in response to an argument with his uncle, who lived in the building. The argument stemmed from his uncle scolding him for smoking marijuana and spraying graffiti.The perpetrator and most of the victims were immigrants from El Salitre, Zacatecas, Mexico. The vast majority of the victims were from four families.

In 1985, Humberto was convicted of starting the fire and sentenced to 625 years in prison.

The Dorothy Mae building, located at 821 Sunset Boulevard, was constructed primarily of bricks and had been opened to tenants in 1927. The 43-unit building housed nearly 200 people.

The Dorothy Mae Apartment-Hotel fire was the impetus for the 1984 passage of a fire sprinkler law known as the Dorothy Mae ordinance. The Dorothy Mae ordinance "requires all pre-1943 residential buildings of R-1, Occupancy, three or more stories in height, to meet certain specified retroactive fire safety requirements."

== See also ==
- Ponet Square Hotel and Apartments fire that killed 19 people led to the enactment of the "Ponet doors ordinance."
