= Fire accelerant =

Substance that speeds the development of fire

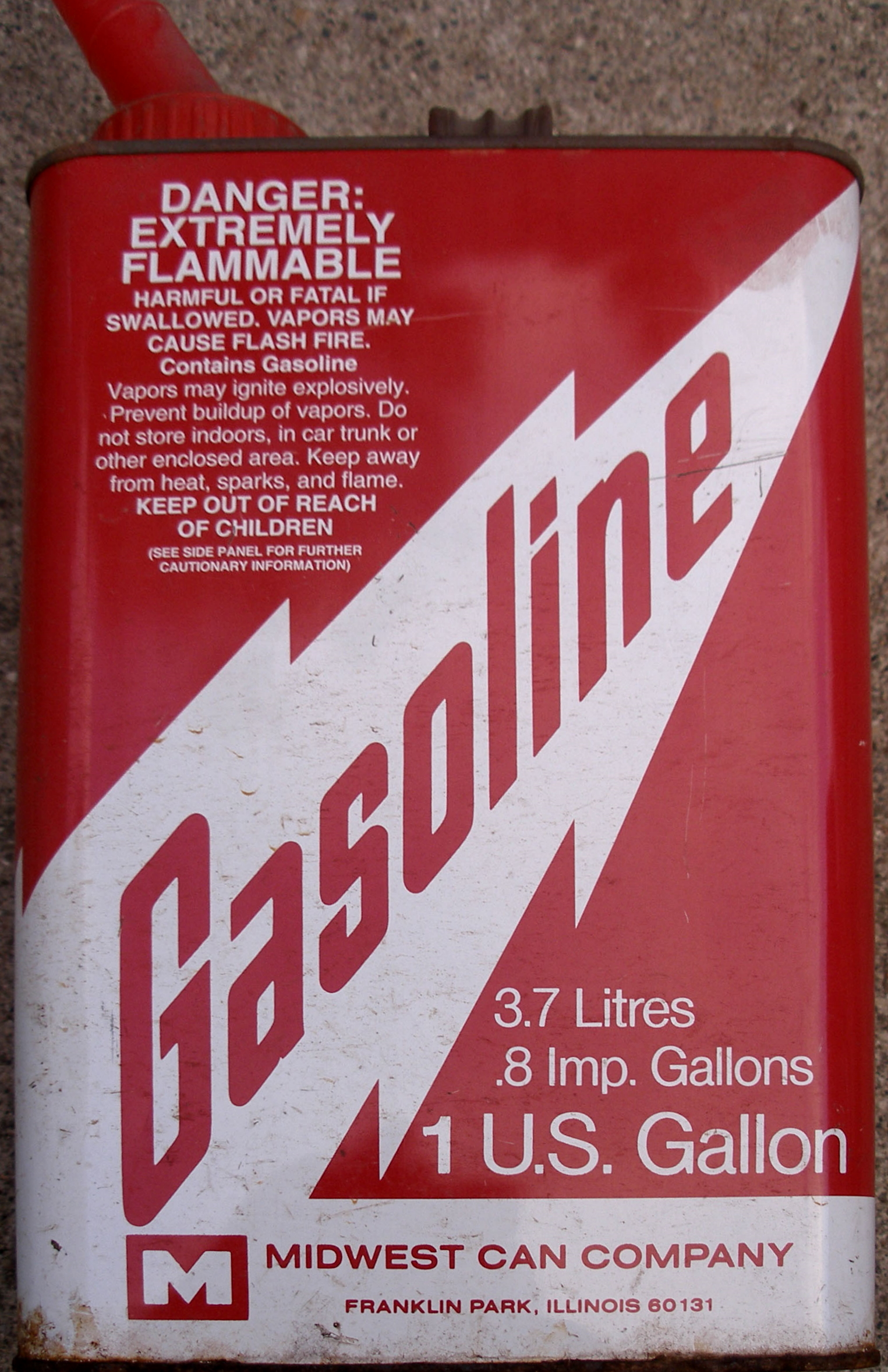
Gasoline can

In fire protection, an accelerant or ignitable liquid is any substance or mixture that accelerates or speeds the development and escalation of fire. Accelerants can be used to commit arson, and some accelerants may cause an explosion. Some fire investigators use the term "accelerant" to mean any substance that initiates and promotes a fire without implying intent or malice. The accelerant works by burning rapidly. As such, the accelerant itself is consumed in the process, and should not be considered as a catalyst. In fire investigation, detection of accelerant at the scene of the fire is considered a potential (but not definitive) sign of arson.

A fire is a self-sustaining, exothermic oxidation reaction that emits heat and light. When a fire is accelerated, it can produce more heat, consume the reactants more quickly, burn at a higher temperature, and increase the spread of the fire. An accelerated fire is said to have a higher "heat release rate," meaning it burns more quickly.

== Fire investigation ==
Indicators of an incendiary fire or arson can lead fire investigators to look for the presence of accelerants in fire debris. Accelerants can leave behind evidence of their presence and use. Accelerants present in areas they should not be can indicate an incendiary fire or arson. Investigators often use special dogs known as accelerant detection canines trained to smell ignitable liquids. The dog can pinpoint areas for the investigator to collect samples. Fire debris are submitted to forensic laboratories employ sensitive analytical instruments with GC-MS capabilities for forensic chemical analysis. Gaseous accelerants like Butane gas, propane and natural gas doesn't leave any chemical residue at a fire scene.

== Types of accelerants ==
Many accelerants are hydrocarbon-based fuels, sometimes referred to as petroleum distillates: gasoline, diesel fuel, kerosene, turpentine, butane, isopropyl alcohol, Lacquer, Methyl alcohol, and various other flammable solvents. These accelerants are also known as ignitable liquids. Ignitable liquids can leave behind tell-tale marks in the fire debris. These irregular burn patterns can indicate the presence of an ignitable liquid in a fire.

The properties of some ignitable liquids make them dangerous accelerants. Many ignitable liquids have high vapor pressures, low flash points and a relatively wide range between their upper and lower explosive limit. This allows ignitable liquids to ignite easily, and when mixed in a proper air-fuel ratio, readily explode. Many arsonists who use generous amounts of gasoline have been seriously burned or killed igniting their fire.

== Available combustibles ==
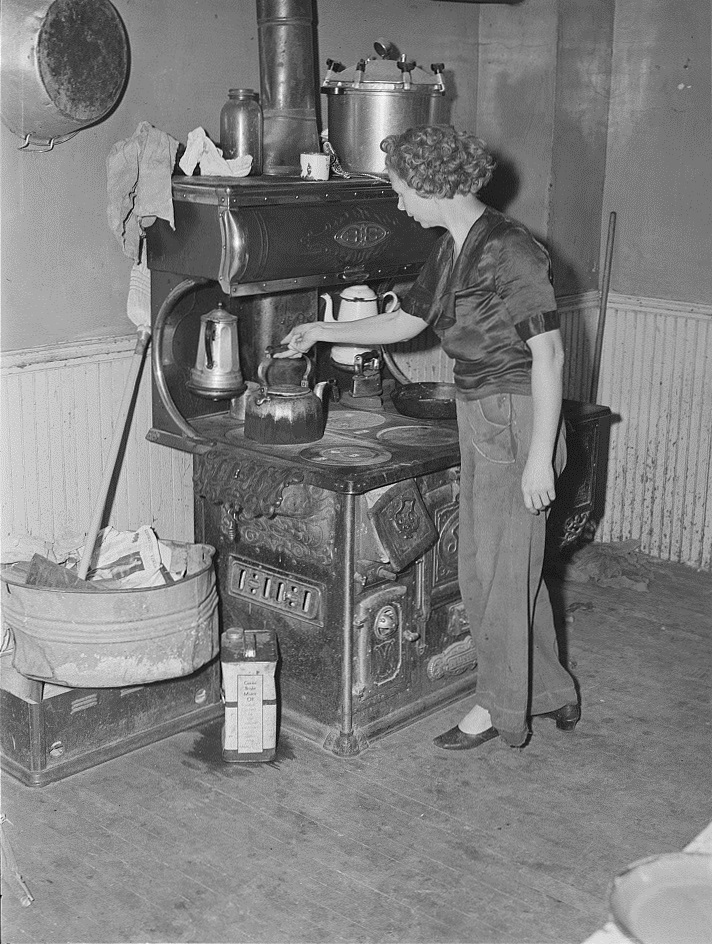
Metal can of motor oil next to wood burning stove and oven; used for getting the wood burning; 1940

Common household items and objects can accelerate a fire. Wicker and foam have high surface to mass ratios and favorable chemical compositions and thus burn easily and readily. Arsonists who use large amounts of available combustible material rather than ignitable liquids try to avoid detection. Using large fuel loads can increase the rate of fire growth as well as spread the fire over a larger area, thus increasing the amount of fire damage. Inappropriate amounts and types of fuel in a particular area can indicate arson. Whether available combustible materials constitute an accelerant depends on the intent of the person responsible for their use.

Sales of certain accelerants are limited to the particular group allowed to purchase them for trainings and fire demolitions (to train new firefighters).

Commonly used fire accelerants include:

- Acetone (C_{3}H_{6}O), also known as dimethyl ketone or 2-propanone, boasts a flash point of -4 °F (-20 °C) and an ignition temperature of 869 °F (465.4 °C). Its explosive limits range from 2.6% to 13.0%, with a vapor density of 2.0 and a specific gravity of 0.792. Characterized by its volatile, flammable nature, this colorless liquid ketone carries a pleasant odor and is readily miscible with water, alcohol, and most oils. Its primary applications encompass serving as a solvent in lacquers, varnishes, cosmetics, nail polish removers, and various solvent blends.
- Carbon disulfide (CS_{2}), possesses a flash point of -22 °F (-30 °C) and an ignition temperature of 212 °F (100 °C). Its explosive limits span from 1.3% to 50%, with a vapor density of 2.6 and a specific gravity of 1.26. This volatile liquid, which ranges from colorless to yellow and emits a sulfurous odor reminiscent of rotten eggs, deviates from the norm by sinking in water due to its higher density.
- Coleman fuel, also referred to as Coleman fuel C-2538, white gasoline, or camping stove fuel, lacks a single chemical formula due to its composition of hydrocarbons. Its flash point is recorded at -27 °F (-33 °C). Despite an unreported ignition temperature and explosive limits, its vapor density stands at 3.7, while its specific gravity is noted as 0.744. This unrefined petroleum distillate, commonly used in camping stoves and lanterns, falls within the carbon range of C5 to C11.
- Ethanol (C_{2}H_{5}OH), also known as grain alcohol or ethyl alcohol, exhibits a flash point of 55 °F (13 °C) and an ignition temperature of 689 °F (365 °C). Its explosive limits range from 3.5% to 19.0%, with a vapor density of 1.6 and a specific gravity of 0.8. This volatile liquid, distinguished by its pleasant odor and miscibility with water and many organic liquids, finds primary application in alcoholic beverages, pharmaceutical solvents, cleaning solutions, and certain antifreezes.
- Diethyl ether ((C_{2}H_{5})_{2}O), also called as ether or ethyl ether, has a flash point of -49 °F (-45 °C) and an ignition temperature of 356 °F (180 °C). Its explosive limits span from 1.9% to 36%, with a vapor density of 2.6 and a specific gravity of 0.7. This highly flammable liquid, characterized by its sweetish odor and propensity to form explosive peroxides upon exposure to air and light, demonstrates slight miscibility in water, methanol, and oils. Its primary applications encompass serving as a solvent in organic synthesis, smokeless powder, and industrial solvents.
- Fuel oil no. 1, known by various names including kerosene, range oil, coal oil, or Jet-A (aviation) fuel, encompasses a carbon range of C9 to C17. Its flash point ranges between 110 °F and 162 °F (42 °C - 72 °C), while its ignition temperature is recorded at 410 °F (210 °C). With explosive limits from 0.7% to 5%, its vapor density ranges from 0.7 to 5, with a specific gravity of 0.81. This colorless, combustible petroleum distillate, notable for its characteristic odor and solubility in petroleum solvents, finds application across various industries, including lamp oil manufacturing, charcoal starter fluid production, jet engine fuel formulation, and insecticide creation.
- Fuel oil no. 2, alternatively known as home heating fuel or diesel fuel, encompasses a carbon range of C9 to C23. Its flash point varies between 126 °F and 204 °F (52 °C - 96 °C), with an ignition temperature of 494 °F (257 °C). While explosive limits remain unreported, its vapor density exceeds 1, with a specific gravity below 1. This light brown, combustible petroleum distillate primarily consists of C9 to C23 hydrocarbons and finds application as heating fuel in domestic or commercial atomizing-type burners and as fuel for diesel engines.
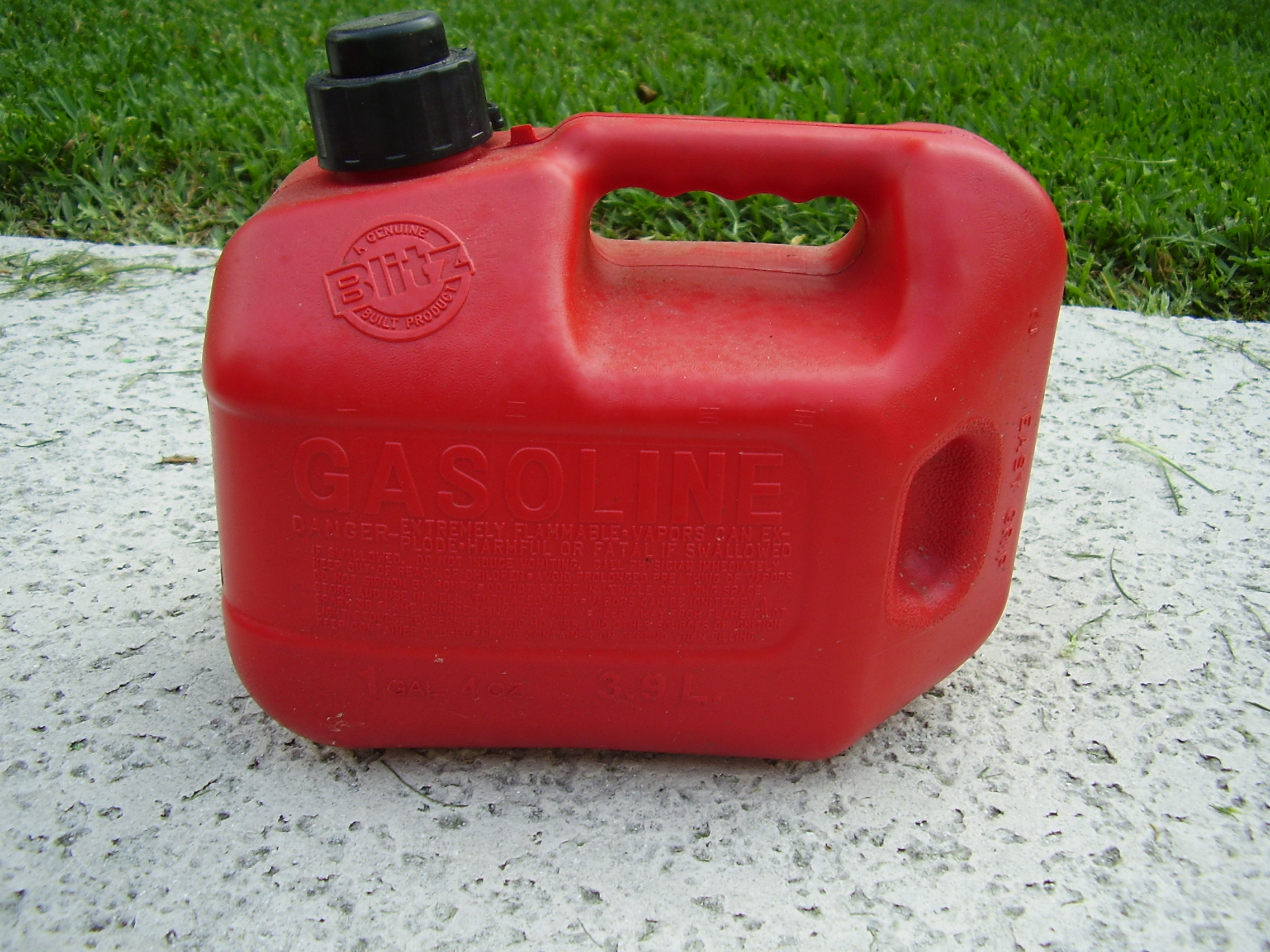
  Container of gasoline.
- Gasoline, commonly referred to as gas or motor fuel, is a blended mixture of aromatic and aliphatic hydrocarbons. It boasts a flash point of -45 °F (-43 °C) and an ignition temperature ranging from 536 °F (280 °C) for 56-60 octane grade. With explosive limits from 1.4% to 7.6%, its vapor density ranges from 3.0 to 4.0, with a specific gravity of 0.8. This highly flammable liquid, comprising over 300 volatile hydrocarbon compounds derived from petroleum fractionation or distillation, serves as the predominant ignitable liquid accelerant in forensic investigations and is primarily utilized as fuel in spark-ignited internal combustion engines.
- Isopropyl alcohol ((CH_{3})_{2}CHOH), known by its abbreviations IPA or isopropanol, possesses a flash point of 54 °F (12 °C) and an ignition temperature of 750 °F (399 °C). With explosive limits ranging from 2.5% to 12.0%, its vapor density is measured at 2.1, with a specific gravity of 0.79. This colorless, flammable liquid, characterized by its pleasant odor and miscibility in water, ether, and alcohol, serves as a key ingredient in lacquers, rubbing alcohol, denaturants, and lotions.
- Lacquer refers to a category of products whose composition and properties vary among manufacturers. It may include spirit varnishes like shellac or synthetic organic coatings that dry to form a film through solvent evaporation.
- Lacquer Thinner denotes a blend of highly volatile solvents, miscible in water, whose composition and properties vary depending on the manufacturer.
- Methanol (CH_{3}OH), also known as methyl alcohol or wood alcohol, possesses a flash point of 54 °F (12 °C) and an ignition temperature of 867 °F (484 °C). Its explosive limits range from 6.7% to 36%, with a vapor density of 1.1 and a specific gravity of 0.79. This colorless, flammable, and poisonous liquid, featuring a slight alcohol odor in its pure form, is miscible in water, ethanol, ketones, and various other organic solvents. Its principal applications include serving as an ingredient in antifreeze, dry gas, windshield washer fluids, and as a denaturant in ethanol.
- Butanone (CH_{3}C(O)CH_{2}CH_{3}) also known as methyl ethyl ketone, MEK, or 2-butanone, boasts a flash point of 16 °F (-9 °C) and an ignition temperature of 759 °F (404 °C). Its explosive limits range from 1.9% to 10.0%, with a vapor density of 2.5 and a specific gravity of 0.8. This colorless, flammable liquid, bearing an acetone-like odor and miscibility in alcohol and ether, finds primary use as a solvent in nitrocellulose coatings and lacquers, paint removers, adhesives, cements, and in printed circuit board manufacturing.
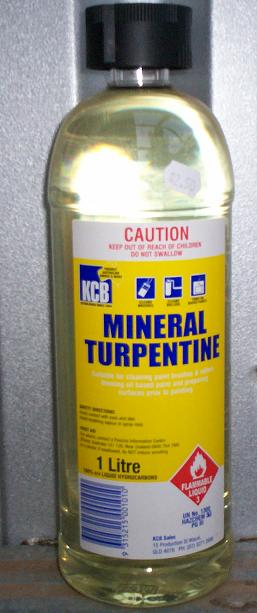
  bottle of mineral turpentine
- White spirit, known as mineral spirits (in North America) or paint thinner, is a complex petroleum distillate with a flash point range between 104 °F (40 °C) and 110 °F (43 °C). With an ignition temperature of 473 °F (245 °C) and explosive limits of 0.8% at 212 °F (100 °C), mineral spirits possess a vapor density of 3.9 and a specific gravity of 0.8. This category of clear, combustible liquid, characterized by its petroleum-type odor, encompasses midrange petroleum distillates ranging from C8 to C12 and finds application in paint thinners, oil-based stains, dry cleaning solvents, and select charcoal starter fluids.
- Naphtha, also known as VM & P (Varied Marketed Products), is a generic term encompassing combustible products such as mineral spirits or flammable products like petroleum ether. The IAAI Forensic Science Committee recommends avoiding the term due to its broad usage. Products within this class serve primarily as thinners in paints and varnishes and as fuel for pocket lighters, with properties including flash point, explosive limits, and others varying by manufacturer.
- Toluene (C_{6}H_{5}CH_{3}), also known as methylbenzene or phenyl methane, exhibits a flash point of 40 °F (4 °C) and an ignition temperature of 896 °F (480 °C). Its explosive limits range from 1.3% to 7.0%, with a vapor density of 3.1 and a specific gravity of 0.8. This colorless, flammable liquid, featuring a benzene-like odor, demonstrates miscibility in alcohol, ether, acetone, and slight solubility in water. Its primary application lies in serving as a solvent in paints and coatings, paint removers, explosives (TNT), adhesive solvents for model airplanes, and as a base for polyurethane resins.
- Turpentine (C_{10}H_{16}), also known as oil of turpentine, derived from steam distillation of pine (conifer) tree wood, boasts a flash point between 90 °F and 115 °F (32 °C - 46 °C) and an ignition temperature of 488 °F (253 °C). With explosive limits ranging from 0.8% to unreported, its vapor density is less than 1, with a specific gravity of 0.8. This colorless, combustible liquid finds miscibility in oils, ether, and chloroform, and serves primarily as a drying agent or solvent in paints, lacquers, varnishes, waxes, liniments, and in the manufacture of certain linoleums, soap, ink, artificial camphor, and rubber.
- Xylenes ((CH_{3})_{2}C_{6}H_{4} in three different structures), known chemically as dimethylbenzene, exhibit a flash point of 29 °F (-2 °C) and an ignition temperature of 867 °F (464 °C). While their explosive limits are not reported, they pose a moderate fire risk. With a vapor density greater than 1 and a specific gravity of 0.86, xylenes represent a colorless, flammable liquid miscible in alcohol and ether, yet insoluble in water. Isolated from crude wood distillate or obtained through fractional distillation of petroleum or coal tar, commercial xylenes typically comprise a mixture of three isomers, with the m-isomer predominating. Common applications include conversion to polyester fibers and plasticizers, aviation gasoline, rubber cements, automotive enamels, paints and lacquers, and various other commercial uses.
- Nitro fuel (CH_{3}NO_{2}), has a flash point of 95 °F (35 °C) and an ignition temperature of 784 °F (418 °C). It has an explosive limit between 7.3% and 62% by volume in air, indicating a wide flammable range, which contributes to its high fire and explosion risk. With a vapor density of 2.1 (heavier than air) and a specific gravity of 1.14, nitromethane is a colorless, oily liquid that is slightly soluble in water but miscible with alcohol and ether. It is typically synthesized through the nitration of propane or via chemical reaction between nitric acid and methane. Nitromethane is widely used in applications such as a solvent in industrial processes, a fuel additive in motorsports (particularly drag racing), and as a component in explosives.
