= Culpable and reckless conduct =

Common-law crime in Scots law

Culpable and reckless conduct is a common law crime in Scots law.

== Overview ==
Culpable and reckless conduct has no specific definition but deals with culpable and reckless acts which cause injury to others or create the risk of injury, with no effort made to mitigate this risk by the accused. While injury may occur, this would not be deemed as assault, as assault cannot be committed in a reckless or negligent manner.

The crime does not deal with events which involve only civil liability such as injuries caused by negligence which does not amount to a criminal act. It does apply to many events which, had they occurred in England and Wales, would have been the same offence whether they were caused intentionally or recklessly but in Scotland fail to fall within the substantive crime due to a lack of intention. This is demonstrated in many cases where an offender is charged with another crime or offence (e.g. wilful fire raising) as well as this crime and the eventual crime or offence(s) for which the offender might be committed is determined by the proven intentions.

It will often be charged in parallel with other crimes such as wilful fire raising where it is clear that a criminal offence has occurred but the exact offence(s) committed need to be determined by the facts proven in court. The offence carries a maximum punishment of life imprisonment but the circumstances (and thus the eventual sentence applied) of individual cases will often fall short of requiring such a punishment and might not proceed beyond the sheriff court which has limited sentencing powers.

=== Recklessness ===
While there is no statutory definition, a summary of what constitutes the crime can be inferred from a draft Scottish Legal Code which drew upon current law and proposed the following for a statutory offence of recklessness:

For the purposes of criminal liability—

- (a) something is caused recklessly if the person causing the result is, or ought to be, aware of an obvious and serious risk that acting will bring about the result but nonetheless acts where no reasonable person would do so;
- (b) a person is reckless as to a circumstance, or as to a possible result of an act, if the person is, or ought to be, aware of an obvious and serious risk that the circumstance exists, or that the result will follow, but nonetheless acts where no reasonable person would do so;
- (c) a person acts recklessly if the person is, or ought to be, aware of an obvious and serious risk of dangers or of possible harmful results in so acting but nonetheless acts where no reasonable person would do so.

== Case law ==
The case Her Majesty's Advocate v. Harris states how the crime of culpable and reckless conduct will occur:

There are two ways in which reckless conduct may become criminal. Reckless conduct to the danger of the lieges will constitute a crime in Scotland and so too will reckless conduct which has caused actual injury.

=== Reckless injury ===
Judicial precedent has developed a crime of unintentionally but recklessly causing injury to another. This has been proposed in case law as an alternative to assault as there no need to prove "evil intent" (as would be the case for assault). There is no requirement for the accused to actively or deliberately make efforts to cause injury, provided that it is foreseeable injury could be caused by non-action or an omission and that a causal link exists with the injury. The case of Kimmins v. Nomand displays this point: the accused was detained for a legitimate search by police and denied having needles on their person. A police officer subsequently suffered a needle stick injury when searching the accused, who was laterally charged with "recklessly causing injury".

=== Reckless endangerment of the lieges ===
The case of Robson v Spiers establishes the foreseeability of potential danger or injury to the public by the accused's course of action. Again there need not be any physical injury to a person, only the need to demonstrate possible endangerment to the public.

A high degree of recklessness is required, more than what could be construed as carelessness or negligence. The accused must have acted in a manner that demonstrated an utter disregard for the consequences of his conduct on the general public and a total indifference to their safety.

== See also ==
- Public nuisance – former offence under the common law of England and Wales, current offence under the common law of Northern Ireland
- Reckless endangerment – offence in many jurisdictions in the United States with a similar definition
