= Arson =

Intentional burning of property as a crime

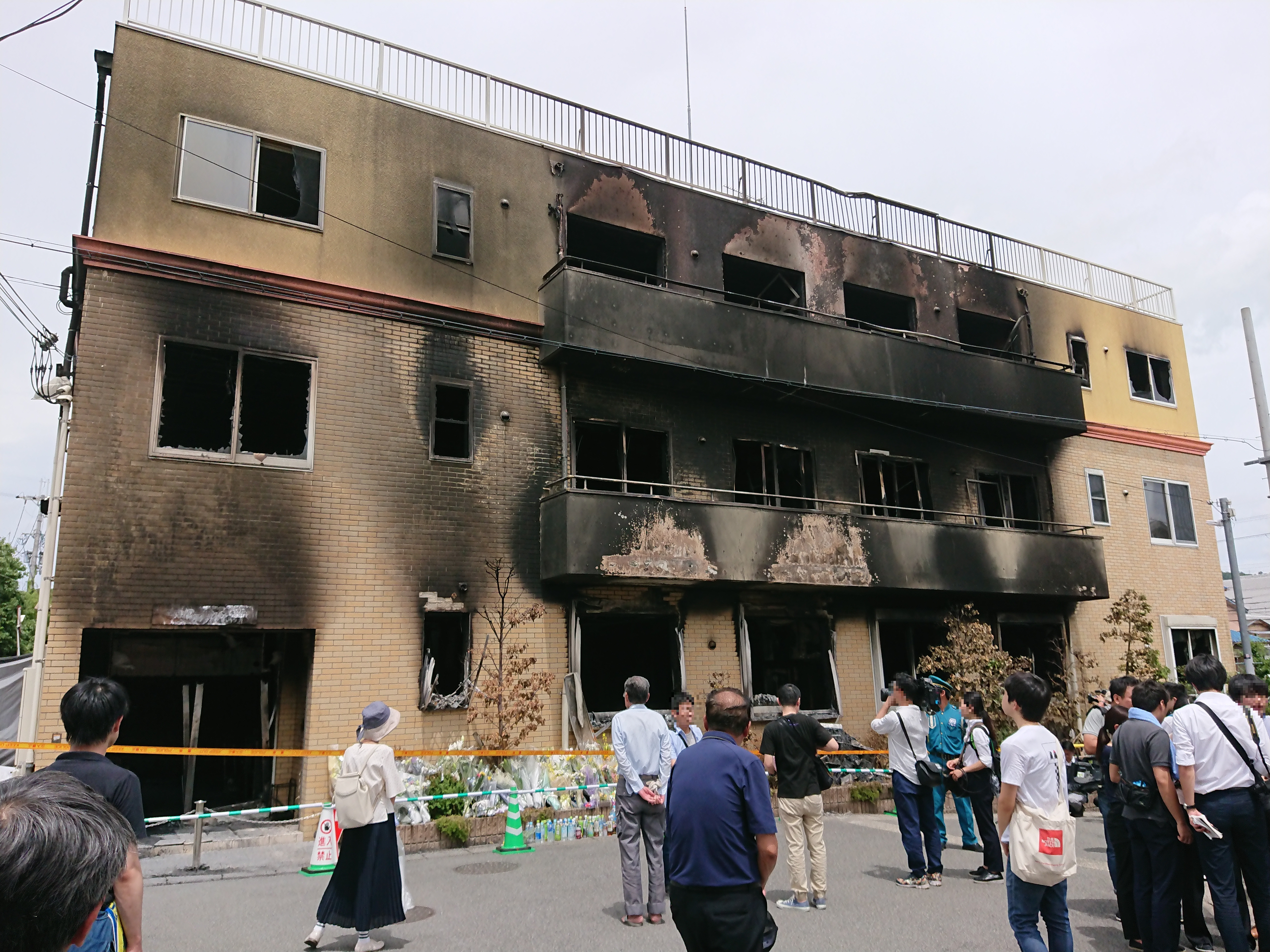
The remains of Kyoto Animation Studio 1 after being set ablaze by an arsonist

Arson is the act of willfully and deliberately setting fire to or charring property. A person who commits arson is referred to as an arsonist, or a serial arsonist if the person has committed arson several times. Although the act of arson typically involves buildings, the term can also refer to the intentional burning of other things, such as motor vehicles, watercraft, or forests.

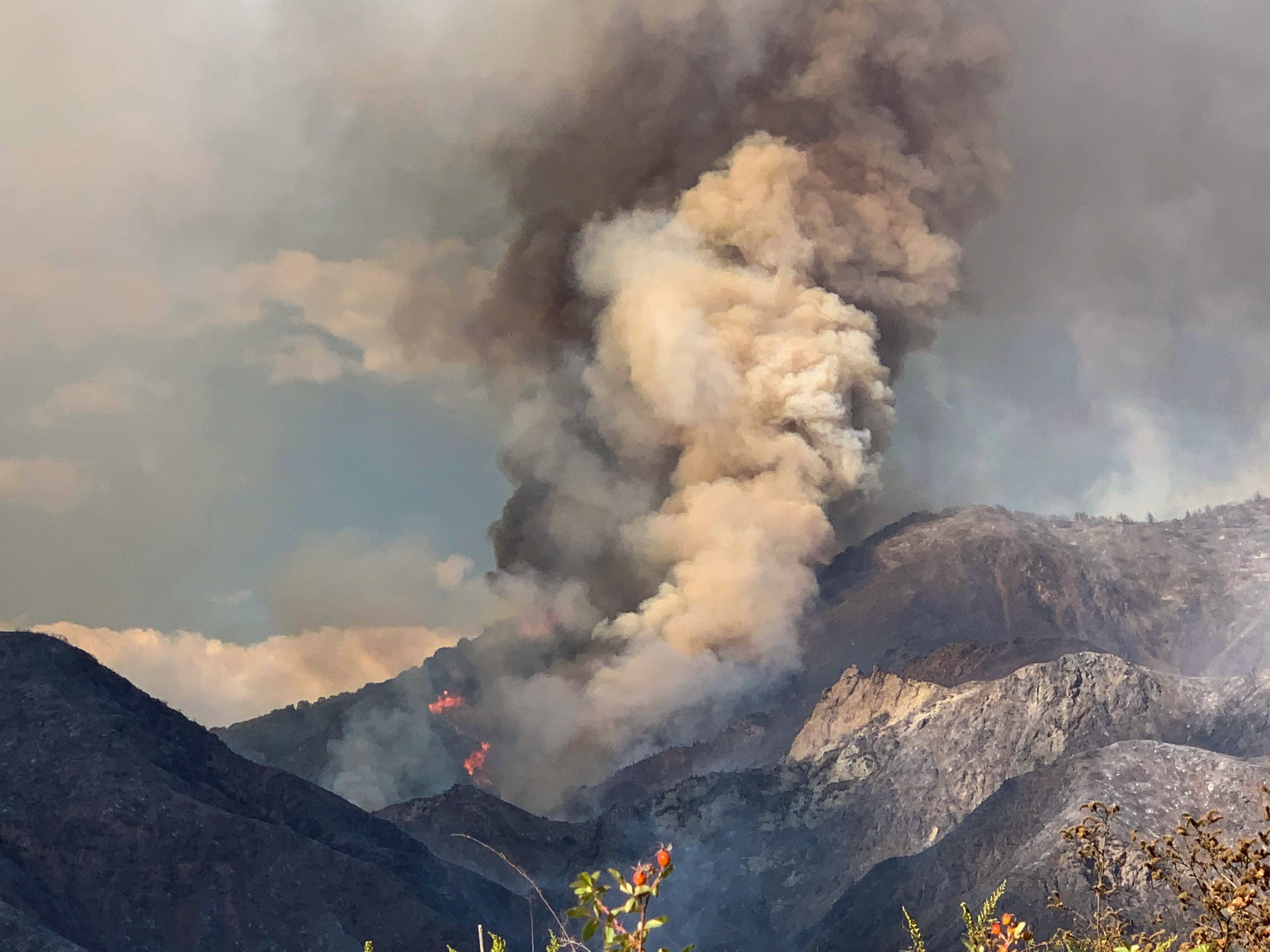
Arson is legally distinct from "reckless burning" in some jurisdictions. El Dorado Fire in 2020 caused by a gender reveal party.

Arson is considered distinct from pyromania, an impulse control disorder characterized by an obsession with fire. Most acts of arson are not committed by pyromaniacs. Reckless burning is legally distinct from arson in some jurisdictions, but generally refers to cases where an individual causes a fire which results in death, destruction of property, or injury, through negligence or inattention.

Arson of a mosque in the Palestinian village of Mu'arrajat by Hilltop Youth, February 2025

Arsonists may set fires during riots, civil unrest, ethnic cleansing or war. An arsonist may commit the crime as an act of war, terrorism, for financial gain (i.e., insurance fraud or arson-for-profit), emotional satisfaction (i.e., firefighter arson, personal entertainment, retribution, or revenge), or in the concealment of another crime like robbery or homicide. Fires are generally set using an accelerant (such as gasoline or kerosene) to ignite, propel, and direct the flames. The detection and identification of ignitable liquid residues is an important part of fire investigation.

== Etymology ==
The term derives from Law French arsoun (late 13th century), from Old French arsion, from Late Latin ārsiōnem "a burning," (acc.) from the verb ardēre, "to burn."

The Old English term was bærnet, lit. "burning"; and Edward Coke has indictment of burning (1640). Arsonist is from 1864.

== Motivations ==
Arson has been a documented practice for centuries. Arson (sometime called "fire setting" in scholarly literature) may have varying motivations, and can be difficult to profile. Arson may be committed for a number of reasons. The wide variety of these motivations, along with limitations on cohort size, and variations in the scholarly, legal, social, and psychological definitions of arson/fire setting makes generalizations difficult.

One or more individuals may commit arson during a riot as an act of vandalism, or during civil disorder or an ethnic cleansing as an act of war, terrorism or act of political protest. For instance, it is not uncommon for buildings, cars, dumpsters to be set on fire following sporting events in some cities and nations. Fires may be set to provide "cover" to retreating or advancing forces, like in 1991 when the Iraqi military retreated from Kuwait. Groups including the Provisional IRA and the Women's Social and Political Union have used arson as a political act of violence. During the most recent Myanmar civil war the Military junta engaged in a campaign of burning homes to drive out combatants in urban areas. Inversely, arson (or intent to commit arson) has been used as a false flag or smear campaign against activists, as in the case of Marinus van der Lubbe and Martin Sostre.

Other motivations include financial gain (i.e., a person destroys their own property by burning it and attempts to collect against their insurance policy). In 2019 the California Department of Insurance and San Jose Fire Department were tipped off as to an insurance fraud scheme when the location of a planned incident was given to a tip line. After an investigation, a married couple and four co-conspirators were arrested and convicted with arson and insurance fraud after a string of home, business, and warehouse fires which took place over four years. The criminals left chicken in turned-on deep fryers to make the damage look like the result of a cooking accident. The group then filled insurance claims for the cost of the building, as well as smoke-damaged goods to claim fire damages for insurance payouts. The group's scheme claimed a reported $4 million before they were caught.

Fire may be set for emotional satisfaction, firefighter arson, personal entertainment, or as a tool of assault or revenge. Arson investigator John Leonard Orr and other firefighter arsonists have been convicted of setting fires either personal entertainment or as a form of hero syndrome. Arsonists may set a fire in an attempt to damage a small amount of property (as revenge against a landlord, employer, friend or relative) without understanding how quickly a fire can spread. The Dupont Plaza Hotel which killed 99 persons happened after three striking workers set fire to a storeroom of new furniture. The fire flashed over and ignited the ballroom and shortly, the rest of the hotel. Artist Lisa Lopes accidentally burned down the mansion she shared with Andre Rison in 1994 after setting fire to his sneakers in a bathtub. Many deadly fires have been set during or following arguments.

A person may also commit arson as the result of a psychotic episode as a result of delusions or hallucinations and may or may not be found criminally insane. Some arsonists have been committed to psychiatric hospitals instead of prison.

Additional reasons for arson include an attempt to conceal another crime like robbery or homicide. These attempts are often unsuccessful at hiding blunt trauma, stab wounds, and gunshot wounds. Medical examiners may use a blood test and/or look for soot in the esophagus, lungs or mouth to check if the decedent was alive at the time of a fire.

== By region ==
Arson exists in a variety of legal definitions worldwide. In many countries, including the Commonwealth and France, "arson" generally refers to a subsection of criminal or property damage. Generally, offenses are more severe when human lives were endangered. Some countries like Scotland differentiate the act of arson into wilful fire raising (the damage to property) and culpable and reckless conduct (injury to a person).

=== English common law ===
English common law defines arson as "the malicious burning of the dwelling of another". The common law offence was abolished in England and Wales in 1971.

This definition has four elements:

Malicious
For purposes of common law arson, "malicious" refers to intention of starting the fire. Fires can be started on purpose or by accident. In either case, there is legal precedent to charge the guilty person with arson whether their intention was to start a fire or not. "Malicious" in this case describes the intention of the arsonist as ill-intentioned and intending to cause harm or death.
Burning
According to common law, charring to any part of a dwelling is sufficient to satisfy this element. No significant amount of damage to the dwelling is required. Any injury or damage to the structure caused by exposure to heat or flame is sufficient.
Of the dwelling
'Dwelling' refers to a place of residence. The destruction of an unoccupied building is not considered arson: "since arson protected habitation, the burning of an unoccupied house did not constitute arson." At common law, a structure does not become a residence until the first occupants has moved in, and ceases to be a dwelling if the occupants abandon the premises with no intention of resuming their residency. 'Dwelling' includes structures and outbuildings within the curtilage. Dwellings are not limited to houses. A barn can be the subject of arson if occupied as a dwelling.
Of another
Burning one's own dwelling does not constitute common law arson, even if the purpose were to collect insurance, because "it was generally assumed in early England that one had the legal right to destroy his own property in any manner he chose". Moreover, for purposes of common law arson, possession or occupancy rather than title determines whose dwelling the structure is. Thus a tenant who sets fire to his rented house would not be guilty of common law arson, while the landlord who set fire to a rented dwelling house he owned would be guilty.

=== United States ===
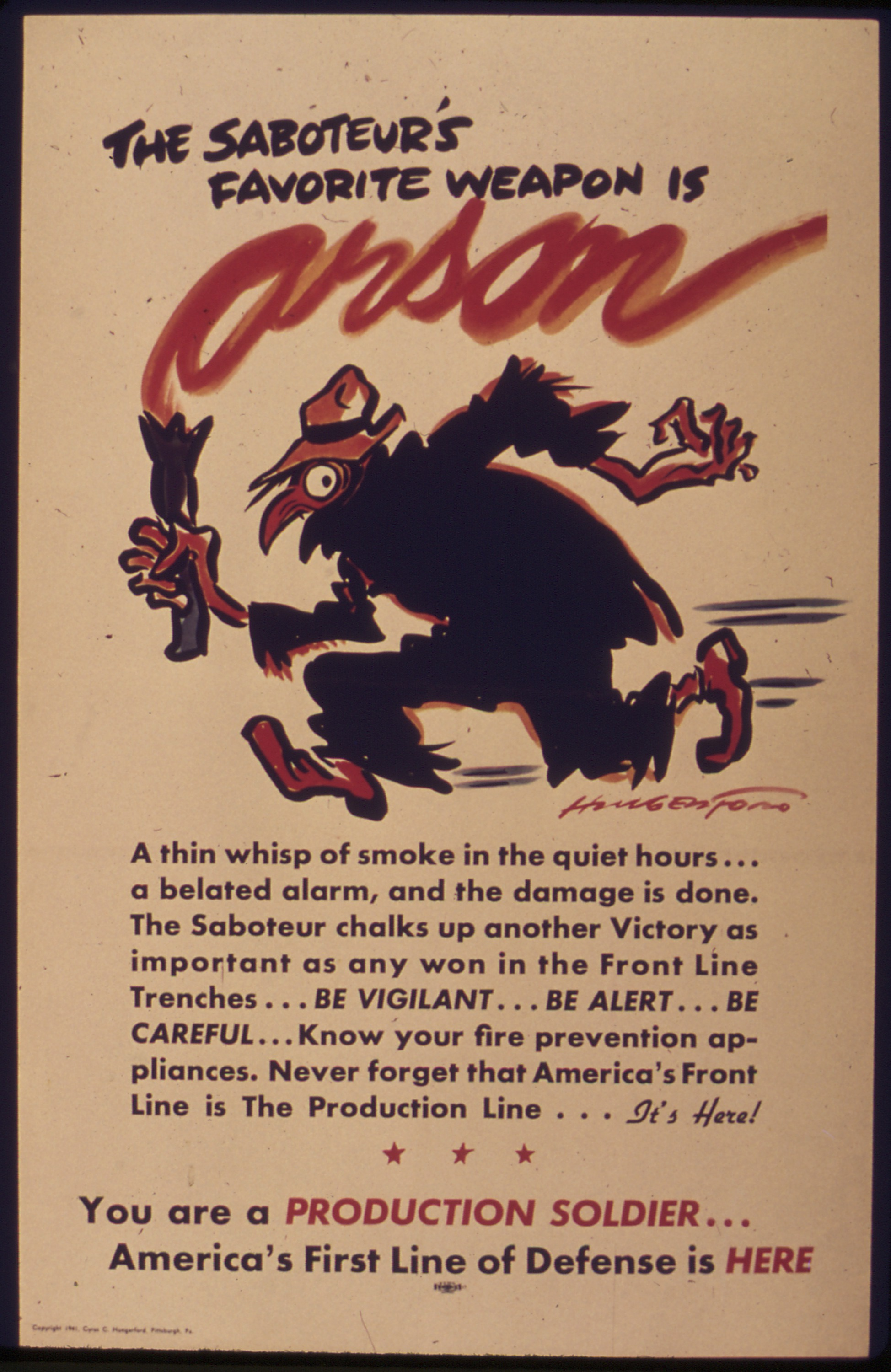
A U.S. World War II era arson poster. The image seen above was created out of fear of arson attacks during World War II. Once the war ended, Smokey Bear made his debut because fire safety was more of a concern than acts of arson.

In the United States, the common law elements of arson are often varied in different jurisdictions. For example, the element of "dwelling" is no longer required in most states, and arson occurs by the burning of any real property without consent or with unlawful intent.

==== Degrees ====
Arson is prosecuted with attention to degree of severity in the alleged offense, but some states do not categorize arson by any degree. In the state of Tennessee, arson is categorized as "arson" and "aggravated arson".

First degree arson generally occurs when people are harmed or killed in the course of the fire, while second degree arson occurs when significant destruction of property occurs. While usually a felony, arson may also be prosecuted as a misdemeanor, "criminal mischief", or "destruction of property". Burglary also occurs, if the arson involved a "breaking and entering". In states with the death penalty and in federal law, a person may be sentenced to death if arson occurred as a method of homicide, as was the case in California of Raymond Lee Oyler, and in Texas of Cameron Todd Willingham. In several U.S. state legal systems (and nations like France) arson is divided into degrees depending the value of the property. It may also include additional penalties if the crime was committed during the day or night.

- First-degree arson – Burning an occupied structure such as a school or a place where people are normally present
- Second-degree arson – Burning an unoccupied building such as an empty barn or an unoccupied house or other structure to claim insurance on such property
- Third-degree arson – Burning an abandoned building or an abandoned area, such as a field, forest or woods.

Many statutes vary the degree of the crime according to the criminal intent of the accused. Some US states use other degrees of arson, such as "fourth" and "fifth" degree.

In New York, arson is charged in five degrees. Arson in the first degree is a Class A-1 felony and requires the intent to burn the building with a person inside using an explosive incendiary device. In New York, the criminal charge of arson includes a maximum sentence of 25 years to life.

In California, a conviction for arson of property that is not one's own is a felony punishable by up to three years in state prison. Aggravated arson, which carries the most severe punishment for arson, is punishable by 10 years to life in state prison. A well-known example of arson which took place in California is the Esperanza Fire. Raymond Lee Oyler was ultimately convicted of murder and sentenced to death for a 2006 fire in southern California that led to the deaths of five U.S. Forest Service firefighters; he was the first U.S. citizen to receive such a conviction and penalty for wildfire arson.

Some states, such as California, prosecute the lesser offense of reckless burning when the fire is set recklessly as opposed to willfully and maliciously. The study of the causes is the subject of fire investigation. A recent example of a reckless burning offense is the El Dorado fire which took place in 2020 in California. This fire was caused by a gender reveal party which utilized a smoke bomb which is categorized as unsafe pyrotechnics. The El Dorado fire burned over a 71-day period, destroyed 20 structures and resulted in one firefighter fatality, for which the couple hosting the party were charged with involuntary manslaughter. The El Dorado Fire ultimately resulted in the death of firefighter Charles "Charlie" Morton, who became trapped while attempting to fight the fire. The DA of California considered arson charges for the family members as they were deemed negligent with regard to fire safety.

During World War II, arson was a much higher concern in the United States. There was a severe lack of firefighters due to World War Two. There were few men left behind to help combat forest fires. For example, in Eldora, Iowa, a fire chief reported that his regular membership shrank from 21 to 9 men and their fire fighting force recruited retired members and new members to fill the missing positions during the war. There were additional concerns about wildfires on the west coast, especially following the 1942 Fu-Go balloon bomb incidents. Rather than report on the incendiary bombs, the Office of Censorship instead focused efforts on "reducing forest fires".

On April 7, 2026, in Ontario, California, a warehouse employee was arrested on suspicion of arson after a large fire broke out in a Kimberly-Clark paper-goods warehouse. The suspect reportedly filmed the incident and uploaded the footage to social media while saying "If you're not going to pay us enough to fucking live or afford to live, at least pay us enough not to do this". Three days later, on April 10, a second suspect was arrested on charges of arson after setting several small fires at the Ontario Mills mall. It is unknown if the two incidents were related.

Notable instances of arson in the United States
Year	Incident	Death	Injuries	Motivation
1973	UpStairs Lounge arson attack	32	15	Property damage (suspected)
1995	Murder of Amanda Froistad	1	0	Concealment of a crime (child molestation)
1982	Dorothy Mae Apartment-Hotel fire	25	30	Property damage (personal argument)
1908	Lynching of the Walker family	7–8	0–1	Murder, lynching
1986	Dupont Plaza Hotel arson	99	140	Property damage (labor dispute)
1990	Happy Land fire	87	7	Property damage (personal argument)

Notable serial arsonists in the United States
Name	Suspected motivation	Years active	Deaths	Fires
John Leonard Orr	Thrill seeking (firefighter arson)	1984–1991	4	21
David Berkowitz	Thrill seeking	1974–1977	Unknown	2000+
Thomas Sweatt	Thrill seeking	2002–2004	2	46+
Raymond Lee Oyler	Thrill seeking	2006	5	23
Paul Kenneth Keller	Thrill seeking	1992–1993	3	32

=== England and Wales and overseas territories ===
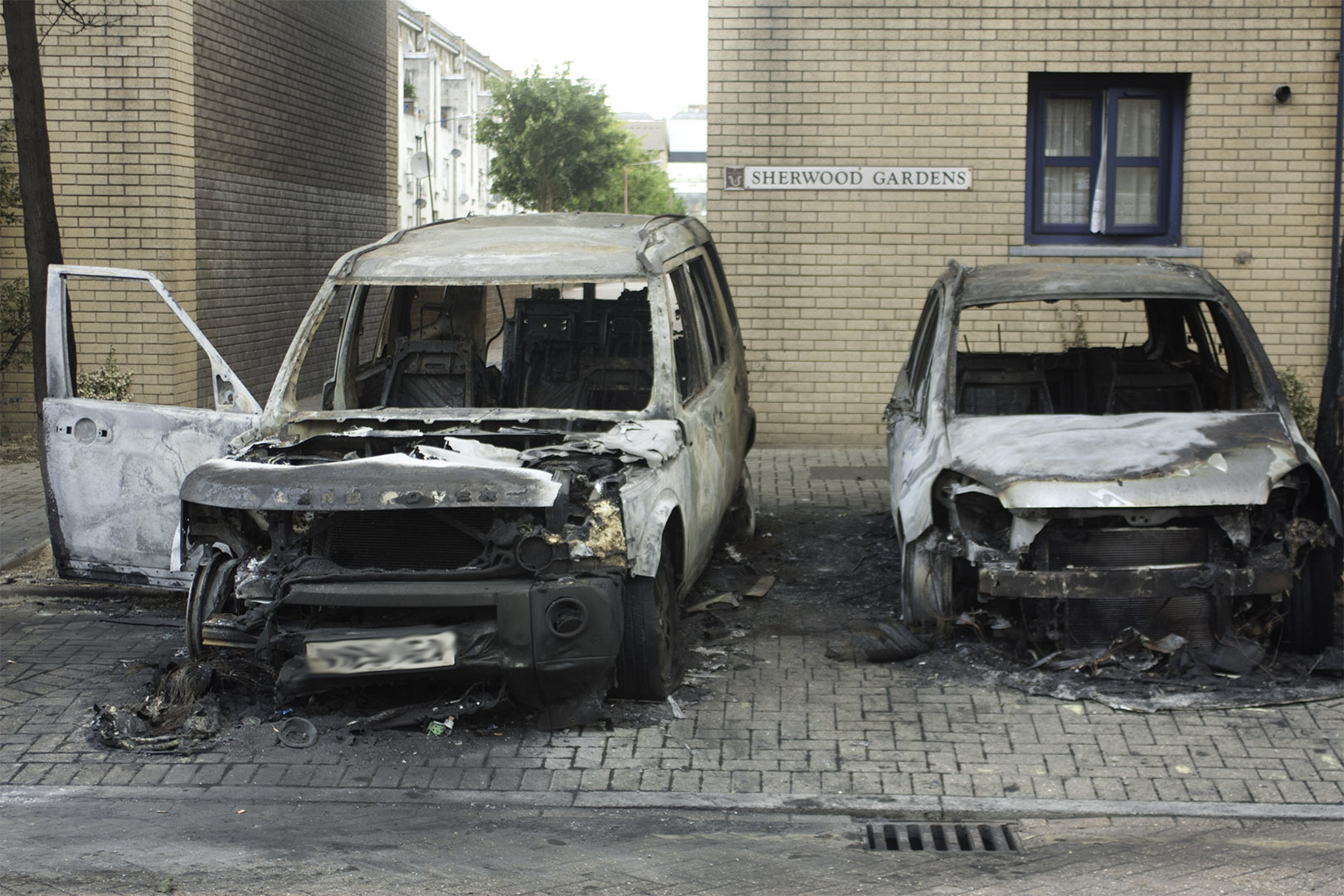
Cars damaged by arson in Millwall, Tower Hamlets, London, during the 2011 England riots

In English law, arson was a common law offence until 1971 (except for the offence of arson in royal dockyards, which is statutory). The common law offence was abolished by section 11 (1) of the Criminal Damage Act 1971. Section 1 (3) defines arson as criminal damage committed by fire; in contrast to common law arson, the property damaged or destroyed need not be a dwelling. Section 4 of the Act provides a maximum penalty of life imprisonment for conviction on indictment.

A variety of notable arsons have occurred in England. In 1680 Margaret Clark and her accomplice John Satterthwayt burned down her employer's home. Clark blamed her actions on pride and breaking the sabbath. In 1791 in Birmingham, the Priestley Riots destroyed several buildings. Between 1912 and 1914 women's suffragists like Emmeline Pankhurst, Emily Davison, and other women in Great Britain and Ireland launched a campaign of arson and bombings to obtain the vote for women. Peter Dinsdale, AKA Bruce George Peter Lee, confessed to a total of 11 acts of arson, pleading guilty to 26 counts of manslaughter. The fires were set from 1972 to 1979. Michelle Confait was murdered in London in 1972 and her house was set alight. In 2008, two students were found murdered in a flat in New Cross. The killer set the flat on fire to hide evidence. In 1981 thirteen teenagers died as the result of a fire started at a house party in New Cross, the cause of which has been speculated to be arson (both investigations returned an open verdict).

==== Hong Kong ====
In Hong Kong, the common law offence was abolished by s. 67 of the Crimes Ordinance 1971 (Part VIII of which, as amended by the Crimes (Amendment) Ordinance 1972, mirrored the English Criminal Damage Act 1971). Like the English counterparts, section 63 of the 1972 Ordinance provides a maximum penalty of life imprisonment, and s. 60(3) of the Ordinance requires that if the damage is by fire the offence should be charged as arson.

A Molotov cocktail damaged a metro station during the 2019–2020 Hong Kong protests.

==== Northern Ireland ====
Fire bombs, molotov cocktails and other incendiary devices were commonly used by militants during The Troubles. In 2025 several buildings were destroyed along with motorbikes and vehicles in a riot following a sexual assault.

=== Myanmar ===
In the Burmese legal system, arson is considered "mischief by fire" under sections 435 and 436 of the Myanmar Penal Code and punishable by fine and imprisonment. The statutes were last amended on 1 July 2016, and made arson on houses and buildings punishable with up to 20 years in prison.

A number of buildings were set on fire during the U Thant funeral crisis in 1974. In 2013 a series of riots resulted in a number of arson related deaths after anti-Muslim riots.

The Burmese military has long used arson as a weapon of war against civilians. Between the 2021 Myanmar coup d'état and August 2022, military forces committed arson on 28,434 houses in the country.

=== Scotland ===
While the Scottish legal system has no offence known as arson statutorily defined, there are many offences that are used to charge those with acts that would normally constitute arson in other nations. Events constituting arson in English and Welsh law might be dealt with as one or more of a variety of offences such as wilful fire-raising, culpable and reckless conduct, vandalism or other offences depending on the circumstances of the event. The more serious offences (in particular wilful fire-raising and culpable and reckless conduct) can incur a sentence of life imprisonment.

In 2023, three young boys were charged in connection with the Ayr Station Hotel fire.

In Kilmarnock, two boys were arrested after accidentally burning down several buildings.

=== Ireland ===
Ireland differentiates how it charges arson not by degree but rather by what is being destroyed and if anyone was harmed. For example, while the sentence for setting fire to a building can be life imprisonment, the sentence for setting fire to goods in a building can only be up to fourteen years.

A notable historical act of arson in Ireland is the burning of Wildgoose Lodge, which resulted in the arrest, sentencing, and execution of 18 men, many of whom were innocent. More recently, the 2023 Dublin riot involved instances of arson, with many such acts targeting vehicles.

Murrough O'Brien, 1st Earl of Inchiquin, an Irish nobleman and soldier, was known as Murchadh na dTóiteán ("Murrough the Burner") for his role in the Sack of Cashel and other similar atrocities during the Cromwellian conquest of Ireland.

=== Philippines ===
In the Philippines, arson, alongside almost all illegal acts is governed by the Revised Penal Code (RPC). Under Presidential Decree (P.D.) No. 1613, arson is generally divided into two categories: Simple Arson and Destructive Arson. Simple Arson constitutes intentional burning of property that excludes any serious and aggravating circumstances that would elevate the crime to destructive arson. Examples are the burning of houses, cars, vehicles, crops, etc. On the other hand, Destructive Arson is a more severe form of arson, characterized by extensive damages to the property and poses a direct threat to public safety. Examples include structures that maybe inhabited or occupied, buildings intended for public use, the intentional burning of a property that poses a direct threat to life and the burning of industrial establishments or facilities.

== Other notable arsonists ==
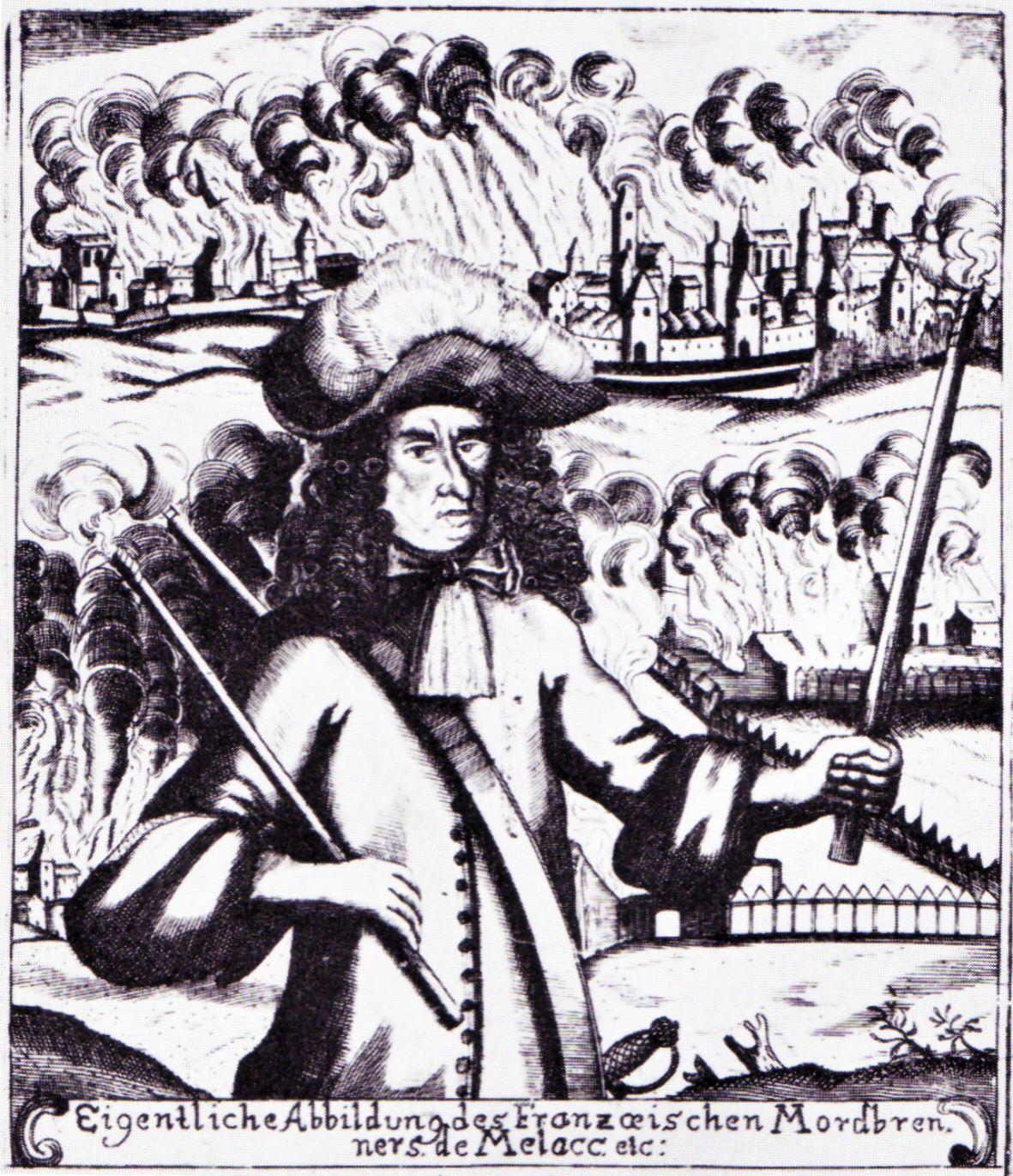
French General Mélac became notorious for burning cities and farms in southwestern Germany during the Nine Years' War.

- Herostratus, accused of setting fire to the Temple of Artemis in 356 BCE.
- Zayd ibn Musa al-Kazim, whose reign was characterized by a pogrom against the supporters of the Abbasids in 815 and 816, which earned him the nickname Zayd al-Nar ('Zayd of the Fire') due to the large numbers of houses belonging to Abbasid family members or their followers that he torched.
- John Magno and several others were responsible for the Woodbine Building Supply fire in 2001.
- Francisco Ignacio Mondaca and Francisco Pinto were responsible for starting the 2024 Chile wildfires that killed 137 people.

== See also ==
- Domicide
- Fire investigation
- Firefighter arson
- Incendiary weapons
- Insurance fraud
- List of cases of church arson
- Pyromania
- Reckless burning
- Molotov cocktail
- Kirk's Fire Investigation
