= Pyromania =

Irresistance to starting fires

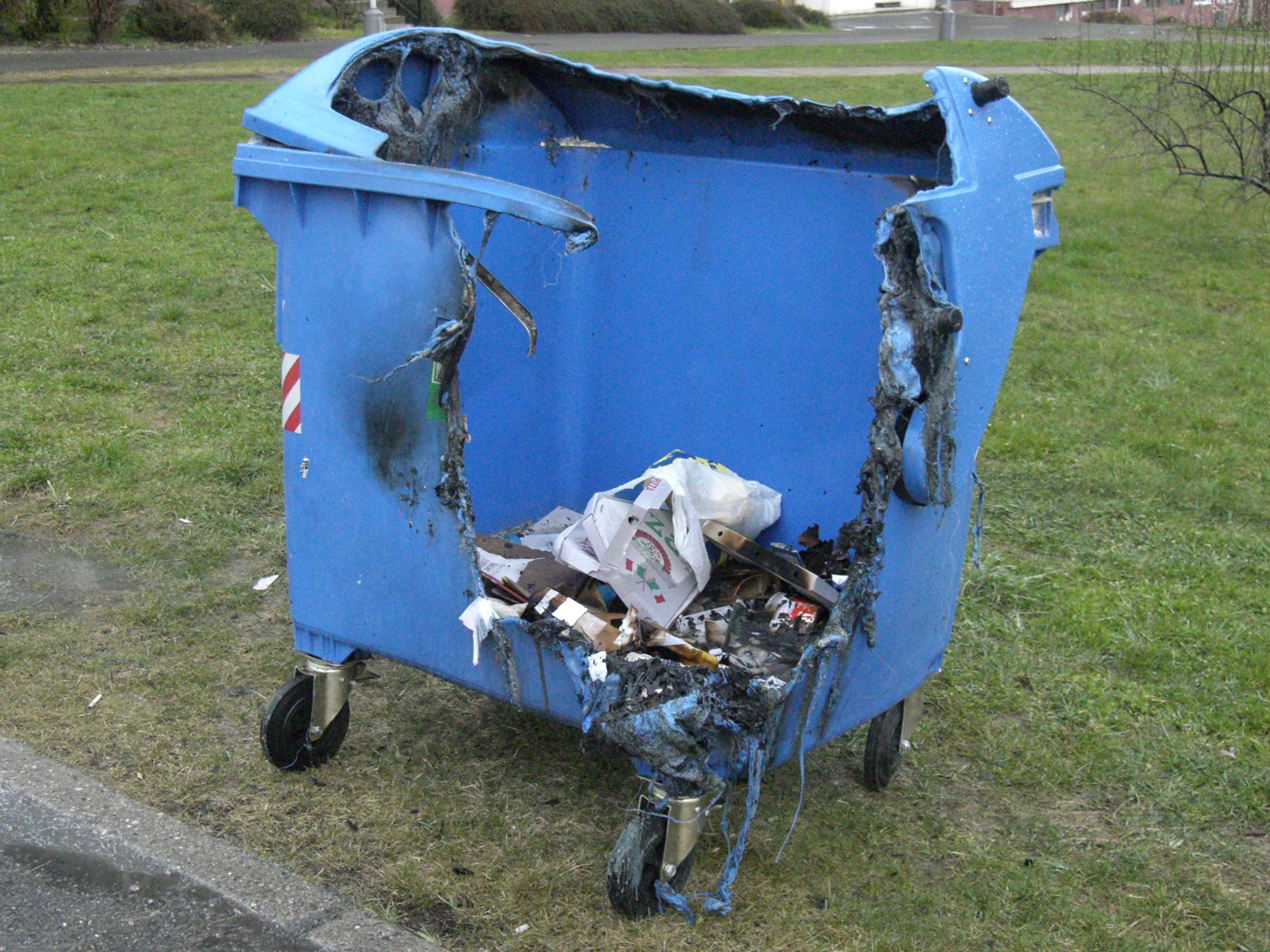
- Garbage container damaged by fire
- Specialty: Psychiatry, clinical psychology
- Symptoms: Impulsive starting of fires
- Causes: Parental neglect, early physical or emotional abuse, early observation of inappropriate fire usage

Pyromania (/paɪroʊmeɪniə/) is an impulse-control disorder in which individuals repeatedly fail to resist impulses to deliberately start fires. An individual with pyromania deliberately sets fires on more than one occasion, and before the act of lighting the fire, the person usually experiences tension and an emotional buildup.

When around fires, a person with pyromania gains intense interest or fascination, and may also experience pleasure or relief. A common cause of pyromania is the buildup of stress in one's life.

Pyromania is distinct from arson, which is the deliberate setting of fires for personal, monetary, or political gain. Individuals with pyromania may start fires to release anxiety and tension, or for arousal.

== Diagnosis ==
There is a lack of training in, and knowledge of, pyromania among clinicians, as it is a very rare disorder and research on pyromania is scarce. Pyromania is often misdiagnosed, as firesetting can also be a symptom of other disorders, such as bipolar, substance use and personality disorders. Bipolar episodes include impulsive behaviours, so pyromania can be misdiagnosed as bipolar disorder if it is assumed that the firesetting is part of a bipolar episode. Substance use disorders and pyromania can occasionally be comorbid. In these cases, the two must occur independently; the DSM-V states that pyromania cannot be diagnosed if the firesetting is a result of substance use. At times, it is difficult to distinguish the difference between pyromania and experimentation in childhood because both involve receiving gratification from fire.

The prevalence of pyromania is reported to be 3–6% in psychiatric inpatients, though it is often undiagnosed in the general adult population. One reason for this is the shame and secrecy associated with firesetting behaviours, which makes individuals reluctant to disclose details to clinicians. It is thought that the secrecy is derived from the fact that intentionally setting fires is a criminal offence and fear that clinicians will have to report their behaviour. The shame is derived from the fact that individuals are not able to control their behaviours, because pyromania is an impulse-control disorder. Another reason for this failure to diagnose is clinician bias around firesetting. Because firesetting is often seen simply as a criminal offence, underlying motives for the behaviour may be ignored.

=== ICD ===
The ICD-11, the eleventh revision of the World Health Organization's International Classification of Diseases, was released in June 2018 and came into full effect in January 2022. Regarding pyromania, it states:

Pyromania is characterised by a recurrent failure to control strong impulses to set fires, resulting in multiple acts of, or attempts at, setting fire to property or other objects, in the absence of an apparent motive (e.g., monetary gain, revenge, sabotage, political statement, attracting attention or recognition). There is an increasing sense of tension or affective arousal prior to instances of fire setting, persistent fascination or preoccupation with fire and related stimuli (e.g., watching fires, building fires, fascination with firefighting equipment), and a sense of pleasure, excitement, relief or gratification during, and immediately after the act of setting the fire, witnessing its effects, or participating in its aftermath.

— ICD-11, chapter 6, section C70

The ICD-11 also notes that the behavior must not be better explained by intellectual impairment, substance abuse, or other mental and behavioral disorders. The ICD-11 was produced by professionals from 55 countries out of the 90 countries involved and is one of the most widely used references worldwide by clinicians, with the other being the Diagnostic and Statistical Manual of Mental Disorders (DSM-5-TR from 2022, DSM-5 from 2013, or their predecessors).

=== DSM ===
The American Psychiatric Association's Diagnostic and Statistical Manual of Mental Disorders, First Edition (DSM-I), released in 1952, categorized pyromania as a subset of obsessive–compulsive disorder. In the DSM-II, the disorder was dropped. In the DSM-III, it returned under the category of impulse-control disorders. Pyromania moved from the DSM-IV chapter "Impulse-Control Disorders Not Otherwise Specified" to the chapter "Disruptive, impulse-control, and conduct disorders" in the DSM-5. A 2022 revision of the DSM-5 (DSM-5-TR) states that the essential feature of pyromania is "the presence of multiple episodes of deliberate and purposeful fire setting."

== Epidemiology ==
Pyromania is a rare disorder with an incidence of less than one percent in most studies. Pyromaniacs make up a very small proportion of psychiatric hospital admissions. Pyromania can occur in children as young as age three, though such cases are rare. Only a small percentage of children and teenagers arrested for arson have pyromania. A preponderance of the individuals are male; one source states that ninety percent of those diagnosed with pyromania are male. Based on a survey of 9,282 Americans using the DSM-IV, impulse-control problems such as gambling, pyromania, and compulsive shopping collectively affect 9% of the population.

- Pyromania is more prevalent in males than females.
- The average age of pyromania onset is 18.
- Individuals with pyromania often observe fires near them and may spend time at nearby fire departments.
- Individuals may also become firefighters or volunteer to help them.
- It is very rare for individuals to light fires for sexual gratification. This could be considered pyrophilia.

== Arson and pyromania ==
Few arsonists are also classified as pyromaniacs, and while similar, the two are largely not comorbid. Arson is often committed to achieve a gain that has been planned before the act; the motive is most often revenge or financial, with the intention to cause harm to property, people, and infrastructure. Conversely, pyromania is a psychiatric diagnosis, and it is specified in the DSM-5 that classified pyromaniacs do not set fires for financial advantage or for revenge. While no gain is planned, planning does still take place for the setting of the fire, such as gathering equipment or flammable items.

== Causes ==
Most studied cases of pyromania occur in children and adolescents. There is a range of causes; common causes of pyromania can be categorized as environmental or individual. Pyromania may be influenced by factors such as individual temperament, parental psychopathology, and neurochemical predispositions.

=== Environmental ===
Environmental factors include neglect from parents and physical or emotional abuse in early life. Firesetters may have experienced a stressful life event, had early experiences of watching adults use fire inappropriately, or felt peer pressure from those who smoke or play with fire. Several studies have found that patients with pyromania were more often in households without a father figure present. Experiences of boredom or a lack of stimulation can also be a contributing factor.

=== Individual ===
Individual factors contributing to pyromania include emotions and intrinsic drive. Feelings of inadequacy, where the individual has the perception that they are not good enough, may lead to firesetting. This factor is related to the environment in that the perception of inadequacy is derived from environmental events; however, when this perception is internalised it becomes an individual factor. Another factor contributing to pyromania is feelings of stress. This could be the accumulation of stress over a duration of time or an isolated stressful event. Patients with pyromania report urges, or intrinsic drives, to set fires. These firesetting desires can lead to feelings of tension or stress within the individual, and firesetting resolves this tension. Firesetting has also been found to provide a "rush" of physiological arousal for patients, producing pleasure. While not always a cause of the initial firesetting behaviour, this arousal may act as a positive reinforcement which perpetuates the behaviour and motivates its recurrence.

== Treatment and prognosis ==
The appropriate treatment for pyromania varies with the age of the patient and the severity of the condition. For children and adolescents, treatment is usually cognitive behavioural therapy (CBT) sessions in which the practitioner seeks to learn what may cause the impulsive behavior. Once the situation is diagnosed, repeated therapy sessions usually help lead to a recovery. Other treatments include parenting training; over-correction, satiation, or negative practice with corrective consequences; behavioural contracting or token reinforcement; special problem-solving skills training; relaxation training; covert sensitization; fire safety and prevention education, individual and family therapy; and medication. The prognosis for recovery in adolescents and children with pyromania depends on the environmental or individual factors, but is generally positive.

Pyromania is generally harder to treat in adults "because of the lack of insight and cooperation on the part of most patients diagnosed with the disorder". Treatment usually consists of medication to prevent stress or emotional outbursts, in addition to long-term psychotherapy. In adults, the recovery rate is generally poor; if an adult does recover, it usually takes a longer period of time. For most adults, their diagnosis of pyromania is chronic, and if firesetting behaviour does go into remission, the behaviour is often substituted for another impulsive behaviour, such as gambling.

Researchers have acknowledged the lack of work on treatment for adult pyromaniacs. Cognitive-behavioural interventions to reduce the symptoms of pyromania in adults have shown some potential, especially when focused on improving social skills, relaxation, and positive reinforcement of alternative behaviours.

=== Drug treatments ===
Controlled drug treatments for pyromania are fairly limited. Treatments using selective serotonin reuptake inhibitors (SSRIs) have been proposed. As serotonin dysregulation has been implicated in pyromania, a number of researchers have proposed that SSRIs be used to regulate serotonin levels; these pharmacological treatments have shown potential. Researchers have also proposed treatments using lithium, atypical antipsychotics, and anti-epileptic medications such as topiramate and sodium valproate. No drug treatments for pyromania have been approved by the Food and Drug Administration of the United States. When considering if a drug treatment might be appropriate, any potential comorbidities of the individual with pyromania must also be taken into account.

== History ==
The term pyromania comes from the Greek word πῦρ (pyr, 'fire'). In the 1800s, pyromania was thought to be a concept involved with moral insanity and moral treatment, but it had not been categorized under impulse-control disorders. In 1967, pyromania was categorized as the second-most common of four types of arson, alongside burning for profit, to cover up a criminal act, and for revenge. A 1951 study by Lewis and Yarnell, one of the largest epidemiological studies of pyromania, found that 39% of those who had intentionally set fires had been diagnosed with pyromania. These high rates of prevalence were not confirmed by later research. A 1979 study by the Law Enforcement Assistance Administration found that only 14% of fires were started by pyromaniacs and others with mental illness.

== See also ==
- Firefighter arson
- Macdonald triad
- Pyrophobia – the hatred or fear of fire
