= Firefighter arson =

Phenomenon of arsonist firefighters

Firefighter arson is a persistent phenomenon involving a very small minority of firefighters who are also active arsonists. Firefighting organizations are aware of this problem. Some of the offenders seem to be motivated by boredom, or by the prospect of receiving attention for responding to the fires they have set.

It has been reported that roughly 100 U.S. firefighters are convicted of arson each year.

Firefighter arsons are not tracked in the United States. The National Interagency Fire Center (NIFC) and the National Fire Incident Reporting System (NFIRS) report arson-related fires, however, no specific system for documenting and tracking firefighter arsons is in place. Without complete information on the statistics of firefighter arsons, these arsons are perceived as isolated incidents. While some states may be able to produce information on the number of firefighter arson prosecutions, other fire agencies do not even acknowledge that the problem exists.

== Profile ==
=== Thrill seeking ===
Motives for a firefighter committing arson vary, ranging from the need for excitement or thrill to the wish to conceal a crime. An excitement-based motive would suggest that the firefighter wanted to be viewed as a hero. The extent of these fires range from "nuisance" fires, such as a trash container fire, to a fully occupied apartment fire. This motivation could be due to a need for excitement or thrill, but also in some rare cases sexual gratification. The firefighter would set the fire, allow it to be reported from an outside source before arriving on the scene, and acting as a hero.

=== Hero syndrome ===
Firefighter arson is also one of the major reasons the term "hero syndrome" was coined and brought into popular discussion. Firefighters committing arson is commonly believed to be a form not only of hero syndrome but sometimes of other disorders and/or disabilities pertaining to the mind. These include but are not limited to borderline personality disorder, depression, alcoholism, pyromania, and suicidal tendencies.

The FBI study found that the arson cases involving more than one firefighter frequently were associated with department programs designed for younger participants, such as those for apprentice firefighters, youth groups, or auxiliary firefighter programs for teenagers.

=== Offender profile ===
In the 1990s, the South Carolina Forestry Commission and the FBI's Behavioral Analysis Unit developed separate profiles of a firefighter-arsonist:

Firefighter arsonist profile comparison
South Carolina Forestry Commission	FBI's Behavioral Analysis Unit
White male, age 17–26	White male, age 17–25
Product of disruptive, harsh, or unstable rearing environment	One or both parents missing from home during childhood. If from an intact home, the emotional atmosphere was mixed and unstable.
Poor relationship with father, overprotective mother	Dysfunctional. One of their parents left the home before the child reached age 17. Cold, distant, hostile or aggressive relationship with natural father.
If married, poor marital adjustment	Poor marital adjustment. If not married, still living at home with parents.
Lacking in social and interpersonal skills	Lack of stable interpersonal relationships
Poor occupational adjustment, employed in low-paying jobs	Poor occupational adjustment. Menial laborer, skilled laborer, clerical jobs
Fascinated with the fire service and its trappings	Interested in fire service in the context that it provides an arena for excitement, not for the sake of public service.
May be facing unusual stress (family, financial, or legal problems)	Alcoholism, childhood hyperactivity, homosexuality, depression, borderline personality disorder, and suicidal tendencies
Average to above-average intelligence but poor to fair academic performance in school	Mixed findings on intelligence, but most arsonists have been found to have average to higher intelligence. Poor academic performance
