= The Blue Knight =

The Blue Knight(s) may refer to:

== Arts and entertainment ==
- The Blue Knight (novel), a 1972 novel by Joseph Wambaugh
  - The Blue Knight (film), a 1973 TV film based on Wambaugh's novel, starring William Holden
  - The Blue Knight (TV series), a 1975 series based on Wambaugh's novel, starring George Kennedy
- The Blue Knight (Tokyo Mew Mew), a fictional character in the manga and anime series Tokyo Mew Mew
- a character in the anime series Astro Boy

== Other ==
- Blue Knights Drum and Bugle Corps, from Colorado, U.S.
- Greg Valentine or "The Blue Knight", American professional wrestler
- VMM-365 or the "Blue Knights", a United States Marine Corps tiltrotor squadron
- The Blue Knight of Gwent, a nickname of William ap Thomas (died 1445)
