= The Secrets of Harry Bright =

Novel by Joseph Wambaugh

- First edition
- Author: Joseph Wambaugh
- Cover artist: Paul Bacon
- Language: English
- Genre: Detective novel
- Publisher: William Morrow and Company
- Publication date: 1985
- Publication place: United States
- Media type: Print (Hardcover)
- Pages: 345 pp
- ISBN: 0-688-05958-9
- OCLC: 12082014
- Dewey Decimal: 813/.54 19
- LC Class: PS3573.A475 S4 1985
- Preceded by: The Delta Star
- Followed by: The Golden Orange

The Secrets of Harry Bright is the seventh novel written by former Los Angeles Police Department detective Joseph Wambaugh. Published in 1985, the book continues a pattern of Wambaugh crime fiction beginning with The Choirboys that uses black humor to explore the psychological effects of prolonged stress on veteran police officers. As with all his novels, The Secrets of Harry Bright, set in November 1984, is contemporaneous with the time frame in which it was written and includes numerous allusions and references to events and personalities of the time.

The Secrets of Harry Bright also continued Wambaugh's satirization of the mores and extravagances of the Southern California "rich and famous" lifestyle that began with The Black Marble, in addition to its focus on police work. The novel, set in and around Palm Springs, California, savages a wealthy "occasional home" mentality characterized by golf, excessive drinking and drug use, and discriminatory country clubs. Wambaugh draws contrasts by depicting the fictional Mineral Springs, a small wind-swept desert town populated not just by blue-collar tourist industry workers, but "ex-cons, bikers, crank dealers, Palm Springs burglars, nudists, robbers and pimps, horny kite pilots, dopers and drunks."

The Secrets of Harry Bright first appeared on the New York Times best seller list on October 6, 1985, ranked 15th, and rose as high as 5th. It spent a total of 17 weeks on the list.

== Themes ==
As with his other novels beginning with The Black Marble, Wambaugh spins his tale from numerous points of view, but has as its central character and protagonist a competent, middle aged but dissipated detective sergeant whose age and police experience mirror that of Wambaugh himself, and where he likely would have been had he not resigned from the LAPD.

Wambaugh introduces a new psychological theme in The Secrets of Harry Bright, that of the relationship of fathers and sons, exploring it as a sub-theme to those of burnout and police suicide that characterized his previous novels. He uses as a vehicle for this what he describes as the "unnatural perversion" of sons dying before their fathers, which has affected three key figures in his story. Although a murder whodunit, the plot is secondary to the gradual revelation of its central character, Sidney Blackpool. The eponymous persona, Harry Bright, is seen only through the descriptions of others until the dénouement of the novel, when he becomes a crucial clue to Blackpool's fate.

== Plot ==
Paco Pedroza is chief of police in Mineral Springs, California, a small nondescript desert town near Palm Springs. The Los Angeles Police Department informs him that they have developed a new lead in a notorious, unsolved Palm Springs homicide in which the body was found in Solitaire Canyon, a notorious biker hangout within Mineral Springs. While Paco unenthusiastically prepares for a visit by an LAPD homicide team, desert rat drunkard Beavertail Bigelow, the object of a prank by one of Paco's cops, stumbles across an antique ukulele in the desert that will become a key piece of evidence in the renewed investigation.

On election day 1984 in Los Angeles, LAPD Sgt. Sidney Blackpool is invited to the corporate office of high tech industrialist Victor Watson, whose son Jack was the victim in the Palm Springs homicide. Over drinks, Watson tells Blackpool he pulled strings with LAPD to arrange for Blackpool to investigate a new lead that tenuously ties the case to Blackpool's jurisdiction in Hollywood. Blackpool suspects that the lead is a pretext to draw in the resources of LAPD after both Palm Springs and the Federal Bureau of Investigation failed to solve the case. Watson knows that Blackpool's son died at approximately the same time, and using that to engage his sympathies, persuades Blackpool to work the case as part of an expenses-paid golf vacation for himself and his partner, Otto Stringer, in Palm Springs. His inducement is a suggested promise of a retirement job for Blackpool as head of security for Watson Industries.

During the search for the missing Jack Watson, Officer O.A. Jones of Mineral Springs PD became lost in the desert, where he accidentally became a witness in the investigation, and in finding the lost O.A. Jones, other officers found the victim's body in a burned out car. While O.A. Jones tries to unravel his delirium recollections of a song he overheard being sung at the crime scene, other officers confiscate the ukulele, which Bigelow has sold to another desert rat, as the weapon used in a domestic violence case.

Blackpool and Stringer check into a posh Palm Springs hotel with $10,000 in $500 bills ("President McKinleys") as expense money. Their investigation starts slowly, as both are more interested in vacation amenities than work. After a visit to the Watson house, where they interview the live-in "houseboy", Harlan Penrod, and then a phone call to the Palm Springs PD, the investigation picks up speed as both conclude that a kidnapping was highly unlikely and try to figure out why Jack Watson would have gone to Solitaire Canyon.

Harlan provides a photo of Jack with a possible suspect. The investigation, with rounds of golf sandwiched in between, takes them to the Mineral Springs PD, the Eleven Ninety-nine Club (a cop bar in Mineral Springs), a gay bar in Palm Springs, a biker's shack in Solitaire Canyon, the Thunderbird Country Club, and a nursing home in Indio. The ukulele and the LAPD cops intersect at the cop bar, where Blackpool makes the connection linking it to O.A. Jones's memory. As suspects are investigated and eliminated as possibilities, Sidney Blackpool and Otto are forced to confront the possibility that either of two sergeants of the Mineral Springs PD, Harry Bright or Coy Brickman, might be Jack Watson's killer.

A tryst with Harry Bright's ex-wife provides the final clues for Sidney Blackpool, who confronts Paco Pedroza with his suspicions. After a heated confrontation, Pedroza agrees to cooperate in arranging ballistics tests of his officers' pistols but before that can take place, fate intervenes. Blackpool and Otto confront Coy Brickman, who reveals a hypothetical solution to the case to avoid implicating himself, tying off all loose ends raised by the investigation. Blackpool demands to see for himself proof of Harry Bright's invalid condition, which is far worse than he had considered. Afterwards, Otto washes his hands of the case and returns to Los Angeles without Sidney Blackpool, who takes the information to Victor Watson. When the interview shatters Blackpool, Sidney returns to Mineral Springs and finally discovers Harry Bright's secret.

== Character synopses ==
=== Main characters ===
- Sgt. Sidney Blackpool – 42 years old, divorced, and with Los Angeles Police Department (LAPD) for 21 years, Blackpool is a homicide detective in Hollywood. He is known as "Black Sid" to his peers because of an excessive fondness for Johnnie Walker Black Label Scotch whisky, and he is still reeling from the accidental death of his 18-year-old son Tommy in a surfing accident fourteen months before. Sidney is tormented nightly by bad dreams that include floating coffins and Tommy's resurrection as a young boy, which leave him sobbing and emotionally defenseless to cope with the loss.
- Det. Otto Stringer – Blackpool's partner, about to turn forty, balding and overweight. Otto transferred to Homicide two months before, after a long tenure as a narcotics detective, as a result of several brushes with death. He and Blackpool are old friends, having been partners twelve years before as uniformed cops. Stringer loves luxury but is practically bankrupt after two divorces.
- Sgt. Harry Bright – A former San Diego Police Department sergeant, he joined the newly created Mineral Springs PD to be near his ex-wife, who divorced him to marry a wealthy financier she met while shopping. Although his reputation as both a good street cop and a good supervisor was unchallenged, Harry Bright drank heavily, often "sleeping it off" in Solitaire Canyon near Mineral Springs before being invalided by a stroke and subsequent heart attack the preceding March. His son Danny, a college student, perished in the crash of PSA Flight 182 in 1978, after which he moved to Mineral Springs.
- Victor Watson – Wealthy owner of high-tech Watson Industries and married to a famous film and television actress, Watson is 59 but looks ten years older. His son Jack was apparently kidnapped from their home in Palm Springs seventeen months before and found shot to death in the burned wreckage of his father's Rolls-Royce in Solitaire Canyon.

=== Secondary characters ===
- Chief Paco Pedroza – A former LAPD sergeant (for nine years) and Riverside County Sheriff's deputy (fourteen years), Pedroza is 51, fat, married, and laid back, but has both common sense and a strong concept of duty. The original chief of police of Mineral Springs, and often filled with doubts about many of his officers, he supports them (if reluctantly) as long as they remain drug-free and aren't thieves.
- Officer Oscar Albert Jones – known as "O.A." (and sometimes "Outa Ammo") Jones, the 24-year-old former surfer is one of the ten cops (most former misfits) in Mineral Springs. Formerly a cop in Laguna Beach and Palm Springs, he left both jobs when he "felt it was time to move on" after incidents of questionable circumstances.
- Sgt. Coy Brickman – A former San Diego police officer, where he knew Harry Bright, Brickman has cold, unblinking eyes and an ominous demeanor.
- Trish Decker – Harry Bright's ex-wife, remarried to a wealthy man 29 years older than herself, Trish is a middle-aged blonde kept beautiful by cosmetic surgery and personal trainers.
- Harlan Penrod – Victor Watson's gay, 60-year-old houseboy, and sometime surrogate father to Watson's dead son.
- Billy Hightower – A huge African-American, Billy is president of the redneck Cobras outlaw motorcycle club, a full-time crystal meth dealer, and a former San Bernardino County sheriff's deputy, fired for assaulting his captain.
- Beavertail Bigelow – A sixty-year-old "grimy wrinkled desert rat" who wanders in and out of the local cop bar, Bigelow accidentally and literally unearths an important clue in the death of Jack Watson.

== Lampoons ==
Wambaugh's novels are noted for numerous quirky but incidental characters, stereotypical lampoons of police officer "types" he either observed personally or the subjects of anecdotes related to him by officers. In The Secrets of Harry Bright the officers of the small, fictional Mineral Springs Police Department fill this role. The common thread linking them is their status as misfits elsewhere, and that all were recommended by Sgt. Harry Bright for hiring. Wambaugh expands his lampoons in The Secrets of Harry Bright to include two episodes depicting wealthy retired country clubbers, Archie Rosenkrantz and Fiona Grout, encountered by Blackpool and Stringer on golf courses.
