= The New Centurions =

1972 film by Richard Fleischer

- Theatrical release poster
- Directed by: Richard Fleischer
- Written by: Stirling Silliphant; Joseph Wambaugh; Robert Towne (uncredited)
- Screenplay by: Stirling Silliphant
- Based on: The New Centurions by Joseph Wambaugh
- Produced by: Robert Chartoff; Irwin Winkler
- Starring: George C. Scott; Stacy Keach; Jane Alexander; Scott Wilson; Rosalind Cash
- Cinematography: Ralph Woolsey
- Edited by: Robert C. Jones
- Music by: Quincy Jones
- Production company: Chartoff-Winkler Productions
- Distributed by: Columbia Pictures
- Release date: August 3, 1972
- Running time: 103 minutes
- Country: United States
- Language: English
- Box office: $7.45 million (US/Canada rentals)

The New Centurions is a 1972 American neo-noir action crime film based on the 1971 novel of the same name by author and policeman (both at that time) Joseph Wambaugh. It stars George C. Scott, Stacy Keach, Scott Wilson, Jane Alexander, Rosalind Cash, Erik Estrada, and James Sikking, and was directed by Richard Fleischer.

== Plot ==
Three rookie police officers, Roy Fehler, Gus Plebesly, and Sergio Duran, report for duty with the Los Angeles Police Department. Roy is married with a daughter Rebecca and intends to eventually become a law student. Gus is a father of three. Sergio is a native of East L.A., who never expected to end up patrolling its streets.

Each new officer is assigned a veteran partner. Roy's partner is the experienced Andy Kilvinski, who has been on the force for nearly a quarter-century and has his own style of law enforcement. For example, he drives prostitutes Alice, Gloria, Wilma and others – who he has supplied with liquor – around the city for hours in a paddy wagon to keep them off the streets for the night.

Gus is paired with Whitey Duncan. As they answer a burglary call at a market, Gus opens fire on an armed figure in a dark alley only to discover that he has killed the owner of the store, who had been pursuing the robber.

Roy begins to frustrate his wife, Dorothy, by becoming obsessed with police work, neglecting his family, and dropping out of law school. He likes policing the streets. However, during a convenience store holdup, Roy tells a couple in a parked car to move but does not realize that they are the get-away crew for the robbers. Without warning, the man shoots Roy with a sawed-off shotgun before escaping, leaving him gravely wounded on the sidewalk.

Gus and Sergio discuss their fear of being shot. Sergio temporarily partners with Andy, and together they handle a call involving a slumlord. During this encounter, Andy becomes enraged and threatens the landlord for exploiting the "wetbacks" living in the apartment. Roy gradually recovers from the earlier gunshot wound and later encounters a shootout, but doesn't flinch.

As the rookies mark a year on the job, Andy reaches his 25th anniversary and mandatory retirement. He discusses the difficulties of police work with the younger men.

As their careers progress, Roy is assigned to the vice squad, where the job is anything but glamorous—mostly arresting "fruits" for homosexual behavior in public parks. Dorothy has had enough, saying she does not care about him anymore. She leaves for San Francisco (where she meets a real estate agent) and takes their daughter, Becky, with her.

Time passes, and Roy is back on car patrol. The cops are delighted when Andy pays an unexpected visit to the police station; Andy had retired to Florida but misses police work. He regrets never having spent more time on his personal life. Sometime later, after speaking with Roy on the telephone, Andy puts his service revolver in his mouth and commits suicide.

Depression gets the better of Roy, who begins to drink on the job. He answers a burglary call and the victim turns out to be Lorrie Hunt, a nurse who helped him after he got shot. Later on patrol, a prostitute named "Silverpants" speeds off with Roy hanging from her car door. He barely avoids serious injury and Lorrie helps patch him up, but he draws a three-week suspension for being drunk on the job. Roy begins seeing Lorrie socially and comes to his senses, appreciating the need for personal relationships, remembering what led Andy to end his life.

Roy, Gus, and Sergio each answer a wide call-out to a large street brawl, which leads to banding together in a car chase, followed by a foot chase. Exhausted after booking the suspects, the trio are on the way to ending their shifts when they are waved down by a woman who appeals for help with her threatening husband. Reluctantly, they decide to investigate. As Roy takes the back stairs, the husband suddenly appears and, without warning, fires a single shot from a handgun. Roy dies in Gus' arms, with Sergio at their side.

== Cast ==
- George C. Scott as Kilvinski
- Stacy Keach as Roy
- Jane Alexander as Dorothy
- Scott Wilson as Gus
- Rosalind Cash as Lorrie
- Erik Estrada as Sergio
- Clifton James as Whitey
- Richard Kalk as Milton
- James Sikking as Sgt. Anders
- Beverly Hope Atkinson as Alice
- Burke Byrnes as Phillips
- Mittie Lawrence as Gloria
- Isabel Sanford as Wilma

In addition, the film marks the debut of William Atherton, in a minor role as Johnson – Roy's final young partner and Richard E. Kalk as Milton.

== Production ==
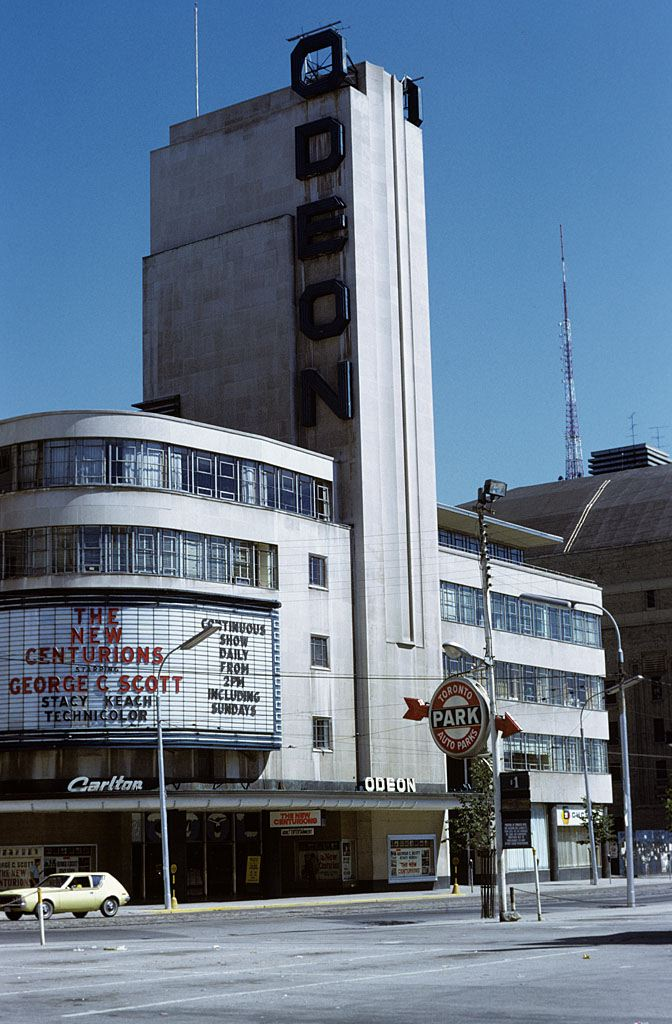
The film on marquee of the Odeon Theatre Toronto (Ellis Wiley, 1972)

The producers made the movie under a "first look" deal they had at Columbia. They acquired the rights to the novel The New Centurions by Joseph Wambaugh in a deal that included paying Wambaugh an additional US$1,250 for each week his source novel stayed on The New York Times Best Seller list, which ended up being 32 weeks and a $40,000 extra payout (equivalent to $318,000 in 2025). Stirling Silliphant wrote the original draft. When George C. Scott agreed to join the cast, Winkler felt they should take advantage of the actor's presence by adding scenes for his character Andy Kilvinski; Sillipant was not available, so Robert Towne was hired for two weeks (the production was already filming) at a fee of $200,000 (equivalent to $1.59 million in 2025), with one of the additional scenes being the character's final phone call and suicide.

The movie was filmed on location in Los Angeles.

== Reception ==
Roger Greenspun of The New York Times wrote:

Richard Fleischer's The New Centurions is an intermittently exciting, sometimes preachy, sometimes ironic, occasionally successful film about the lives of some fictional patrol-car cops on the Los Angeles police force...It is an awkwardly modern movie. Modern not so much in its attitudes toward cops (which are really pretty traditional) as in its attitudes towards fate...Fleischer's direction is technically adequate and emotionally absent. He does not so much direct actors as provide a void for them to fill — and among the principals, George C. Scott is almost shamefully good at filling voids and Stacy Keach is not.
