= The Choirboys (novel) =

1975 novel by Joseph Wambaugh

- First edition cover (publ. Delacorte Press)
- Author: Joseph Wambaugh
- Publisher: Delacorte Press
- Publication date: August 4, 1976

The Choirboys (ISBN 0-440-11188-9), a novel, is a controversial 1975 work of fiction written by Los Angeles Police Department officer-turned-novelist Joseph Wambaugh. In 1995 the novel was selected by the Mystery Writers of America as Number 93 of "The Top 100 Crime Novels of All Time".

The Choirboys is a tragicomic parody about the effects of urban police work on young officers, seen through the exploits of a group of Los Angeles police officers in the Wilshire Division of the Los Angeles Police Department while an investigation is being conducted into an alleged shooting that took place in MacArthur Park, a frequent hangout of the group.

== Plot summary ==
A group of ten patrol officers on the nightwatch conducts end-of-shift get-togethers they euphemistically call "choir practices" (possibly to hide their true nature from superiors but actually a sardonic reference). These "choir practices" almost always involve heavy drinking, complaints about their superior officers, and war stories (and, occasionally, group sex with a pair of lusty, overweight barmaids). They hold the choir practices in MacArthur Park because it is in another division's territory and "one does not shit in one's own nest."

Each of the officers is disillusioned, to varying degrees, that many of the people they're paid to protect are not unlike the suspects they arrest, and that the ridiculous regulations of their department are onerously enforced on them while their commanders (without skills in police work) indulge themselves hypocritically. Wambaugh's portrayals of the ten officers are archetypes of varied personalities found in police departments in the 1970s, albeit well-drawn, but his most cutting descriptions are saved for the brutal "black-glove officer," Roscoe Rules. The theme of police officer suicide (also known as "eating your gun"), which runs through many of Wambaugh's books, provides a grim undercurrent to the black humor of the novel and suggests a sub-conscious motivation for their activities.

== Reception and cultural influence ==
The New York Times said in 1975 that "Very little in Wambaugh's first two novels prepares one for the scabrous humor and ferocity of The Choir Boys."

Due to the popularity of the book, the slang term "choir practice" became a somewhat popular euphemism for off-duty recreational activities even if it does not involve alcohol.

The Choirboys is considered an indictment of the LAPD hierarchy in several ways: the choirboys' dislike and distrust of command-level officers; the way the investigation into the shooting was handled; and many of their superiors' apathetic attitudes about the pressures officers have to deal with. Wambaugh, however, summarized the conduct of the choirboys both on and off-duty by having Sgt. Yanov, their field supervisor, comment to his superior at the conclusion: "They weren't troublemakers...they were just policemen. Rather ordinary young guys. Maybe a little lonelier than some. Or scared."

Wambaugh's previous LAPD novels, The New Centurions and The Blue Knight, had been conventional and straightforward portrayals of his experiences. With The Choirboys he "found his voice," and thereafter his novels were stylistic lampoons of not only the Los Angeles police world but the Hollywood lifestyle, and often filled with black comedy. Wambaugh, by then a successful author, resigned from the LAPD after fourteen years of service in order to publish The Choirboys without retribution from those he burlesqued. The Choirboys is also significant in that Wambaugh turned to the bizarre anecdotes of others (which he terms "cop talk") to provide the grist for his writing after previously drawing from his own experience.

== The Choirboys ==
The nightwatch radio cars of Wilshire Station:

=== 7-A-1: Spermwhale Whalen and Baxter Slate ===
At age 52, Herbert "Spermwhale" Whalen is the oldest and, legitimately, the toughest of the choirboys. However, unlike Roscoe Rules, he isn't "an insufferable prick," although he has the same contempt for most "civilians, police brass and station supervisors, and all members of the Civil Service Department." A nineteen-year veteran, Whalen considers anyone with less tenure a rookie. Whalen was a transport pilot in World War II, the Korean War, and the Vietnam War. He attained the rank of major as a reservist in the Air Force. Whalen is the only choirboy who never attended college. He carries a cropped mugshot of his dead son because it's the last photo taken of him before he died. He's been married three times and says he respects the second one the most because she had the most fortitude to take him for nearly everything he owned.

Baxter Slate, almost 27, is a handsome cynic with a baccalaureate in classical literature, which he considers worthless; can tell dirty jokes in Latin; and amuses himself by confounding Roscoe Rules with his advanced vocabulary. Outwardly, Slate appears to be the most stable of the officers, but he is tormented by inner demons, particularly emotional scars from working child abuse cases, and is driven to suicide because of his shame in inadvertently being caught by Sam Niles in a humiliating encounter with a dominatrix.

=== 7-A-29: Sam Niles and Harold Bloomguard ===
Sam Niles and Harold Bloomguard, both 26, are, like many police officers of the era, Vietnam veterans, former Marines who were trapped together in a North Vietnamese Army cave during their tour. Harold found a father figure in Sam and followed him into the LAPD, where both obtained college degrees in their off-duty time.

On the surface Niles is the dominant of the two. From a background of poverty and abuse, Niles is uncomfortable with all relationships, hastily marrying a coed. They were divorced as quickly. Although he tolerates his partner, he also fears him because Harold knows his innermost shame and secret, the helpless weakness he once showed in the cave.

Bloomguard is the opposite. He's a physical and emotional weakling who attached himself to Sam Niles and dotes on his partner. While Niles had no difficulty meeting all the police selection requirements, Bloomguard, who barely met the height requirement, gorged himself on high-calorie food for three days just to meet the weight requirement. Bloomguard is a protector of the ducks at MacArthur Park and other small and meek animals.

Due to his Vietnam experience, Niles developed severe claustrophobia, which becomes a key factor in the MacArthur Park shooting. Harold Bloomguard was the "driving force behind the inception of the MacArthur Park choir practice."

=== 7-A-33: Spencer Van Moot and Willie Wright ===
At 40, Spencer Van Moot is the second-oldest of the Choirboys and their "great provider", taking the fullest advantage of free meals, cigarettes, and other gratuities offered to uniformed officers by businesses within the division's jurisdiction. He is also a connoisseur of food and fashion and spends much of the time at choir practices complaining about his failing third marriage.

"Father" Willie Wright is a short, chubby 24-year-old officer. A converted and thoroughly devout Jehovah's Witness, Father Willie is, like his partner, in an unhappy marriage, but in his case, his unhappiness is due primarily to an obsessively religious wife who would rather distribute Watchtower magazines door-to-door on his days off than have sex with him. Wright joined the Choirboys out of loneliness and frustration. His guilt-driven, drunken sermons over the evils of drink and marital infidelity, despite the fact that he frequently engaged in both, earned him the moniker "Father" Willie Wright.

=== 7-A-77: Calvin Potts and Francis Tanaguchi ===
Calvin Potts, 28, is a recently divorced black officer and an alcoholic like the rest of his middle-class Baldwin Hills family. His ex-wife's father is one of Los Angeles' top black attorneys who convinced the divorce judge to order Potts to pay nearly half of his salary in alimony and child support, so that Potts now rides an old Schwinn bicycle to work.

Francis Tanaguchi, 25, is a third-generation Japanese-American who was raised in the barrios of Los Angeles, and "unquestionably, the biggest pain in the ass on the nightwatch at Wilshire Station". He believes, at heart, that he's more Hispanic than Asian and goes to great lengths to de-emphasize his Japanese ancestry. Francis is also an inveterate practical joker, once pretending to be a vampire for three weeks and suspected of being behind the anonymous sultry female voice nicknamed "The Dragon Lady" who makes anonymous phone calls to the homes of the choirboys in the middle of the night. Potts and Tanaguchi are collectively referred to as "The Gook and The Spook."

=== 7-A-85: Roscoe Rules and Dean Pratt ===
Henry "Roscoe" Rules, 29, is a five-year veteran of the LAPD. He is brutal and mean, a bully. He was nicknamed "Roscoe" during a choir practice when he referred to his police-issue .38 special as a "roscoe" after watching a Humphrey Bogart movie on television. Of all the officers, he is the one most intent on proving he is the toughest cop on the force and refers to people he dislikes (which is just about everyone) as "scrotes" (short for scrotums). The word was coined by Father Willie Wright for Roscoe to use in reference to people since Rules felt that the word "asshole" was overused in police work, and the word scrotum too long. Of the word "scrote" as used by Roscoe Rules, Baxter Slate quips that it is "a philosophy in a word". Rules hates the city and lives on a "ranch" sixty miles from it, "east of Chino". To describe just how mean Roscoe Rules is, fellow officers created an inside joke that Roscoe Rules "handed out towels in the showers at Auschwitz".

Dean "Whaddayamean Dean" Pratt, 25, is a bachelor who fears Roscoe and kowtows to his every impulse. Pratt is notorious for being unable to tolerate even moderate amounts of alcohol. When inebriated, Dean is incapable of holding even the simplest of conversations. "Any question, statement, piece of smalltalk would be met by an idiotic frustrating maddening double beseechment: "I don't get it. I don't get it." Or, "Whaddaya trying to say? Whaddaya trying to say?" Or, most frequently heard, "Whaddaya mean? Whaddaya mean?""

== Film, TV or theatrical adaptations ==
In 1977, The Choirboys was adapted into a film starring Charles Durning, Perry King, James Woods, Louis Gossett Jr. and Randy Quaid. Ultimately the film was unsuccessful and critically panned. The entire ending was changed for the film, and critics complained that while the book showed the police officers as sympathetic characters, the film painted them as a bunch of drunken jerks. Wambaugh himself refused to have his name associated with the film, as he considered it to be an extremely poor interpretation of his novel. He later said that the experience led him to produce his own films to protect his literary work.

Several characters had their names changed from what they had been in the novel: Sam Niles - Sam Lyles, Calvin Potts - Calvin Motts, Willie Wright - "Father" Sartino, Dean Pratt - Dean Proust.
