= The Black Marble =

1980 film by Harold Becker

- Theatrical release poster
- Directed by: Harold Becker
- Screenplay by: Joseph Wambaugh
- Based on: The Black Marble; 1978 novel by Joseph Wambaugh
- Produced by: Frank Capra, Jr.
- Starring: Robert Foxworth; Paula Prentiss; Harry Dean Stanton
- Cinematography: Owen Roizman
- Edited by: Maury Winetrobe
- Music by: Maurice Jarre
- Production company: The Black Marble Company
- Distributed by: AVCO Embassy Pictures
- Release date: March 7, 1980
- Running time: 110 minutes
- Country: United States
- Language: English
- Budget: $3 million
- Box office: $2.5 million

The Black Marble is a 1980 mystery/romantic comedy film directed by Harold Becker and starring Robert Foxworth, Paula Prentiss and Harry Dean Stanton. It is based on the 1978 novel by Joseph Wambaugh.

== Plot ==
Pragmatic Sgt. Natalie Zimmerman of the LAPD is paired with Sgt. Valnikov, a romantic detective of Russian descent who is going through a midlife crisis and who drinks heavily due to the pressures of his job. Together they investigate the kidnapping of a Beverly Hills socialite's valuable pet dog. It was carried out by sleazy gambler Philo Skinner, who runs a beauty parlor for pets and is desperately in need of cash to cancel his debts.

The teaming of the officers not only helps Valnikov to put himself together, but the pair also falls in love. While containing more humorous elements than most of Joseph Wambaugh's stories, it continues to explore Wambaugh's common theme of the psychological burdens of police work.

The title of the film comes from a phrase used by Natalie. The term "black marble" is synonymous to choosing the short straw or having bad luck. She states that she is always picking the black marble and does not want to anymore. She initially considers Valnikov a "black marble," but ultimately no longer believes this to be true.

== Cast ==
- Robert Foxworth as Sgt. A.M. Valnikov
- Paula Prentiss as Sgt. Natalie Zimmerman
- Harry Dean Stanton as Philo Skinner
- Barbara Babcock as Madeline Whitfield
- John Hancock as Clarence Cromwell
- Raleigh Bond as Capt. 'Hipless' Hooker
- Judy Landers as Pattie Mae
- Pat Corley as Itchy Mitch
- Paul Henry Itkin as Det. Bullets Bambarella
- Richard Dix as Alex Valnikov
- Jorge Cervera Jr. as Dr. Rivera
- Marilyn Chris as Mavis Skinner
- Doris Belack as Married Woman
- Michael Dudikoff as Millie's houseboy
- Lou Cutell as Mr. Limpwood
- Anne Ramsey as Bessie Callahan
- Michael D. Gainsborough as Capt. John "Jack" Packerton
- Robin Raymond as Millie
- Billy Beck as Man at Cemetery
- Herta Ware as Grand Duchess
- Christopher Lloyd as Arnold's Collector
- Adele Malis-Morey as Woman at Cemetery
- James Woods as The Fiddler
- Jane Daly as Bullets' Girlfriend

== Production ==
After the success of The Onion Field in 1979, writer Wambaugh joined producer Frank Capra Jr. to make this dramatic comedy. Both films conform a diptych about the private lives of police officers, under the direction of Harold Becker. Actor James Woods, the protagonist of The Onion Field, also appears in this one, in a cameo as a fiddler.

The producers wanted actress Paula Prentiss for the role of Natalie Zimmerman. After the release of The Stepford Wives in 1975, she had decided to raise her children and thereafter only made television movies, such as Having Babies II and Friendships, Secrets and Lies. For her comeback to films, Prentiss was asked to gain weight to play Zimmerman's character.

== Reception ==
Roger Ebert, in his Chicago Sun-Times review, which was written on February 22, 1980, gave the film three-and-a-half of a possible four stars. Ebert described it as an "unusual and distinctive comedy," and concluded: "This isn't a seamless piece of work, but it's infectious and charming." Gene Siskel gave it 2 and 1/2 stars, stating that the police thriller part worked but the romance did not. The two critics gave the film a lot of publicity when it was randomly chosen as the screening film for a special episode that showed the entire process by which Gene and Roger prepared for their jobs, went to the screening room at a much larger theatre, and then wrote up their reviews for their respective newspapers.

Although The Black Marble was not a commercial hit, it won the Edgar Allan Poe Award for film given by the association Mystery Writers of America.

The Black Marble holds a 36% rating on Rotten Tomatoes based on six reviews.

== Awards ==
1981 Edgar Allan Poe Awards

- Edgar Allan Poe Award for Best Motion Picture — Harold Becker
