= The Choirboys (film) =

1977 film by Robert Aldrich

- Directed by: Robert Aldrich
- Written by: Christopher Knopf
- Based on: The Choirboys by Joseph Wambaugh
- Produced by: Merv Adelson; Lee Rich
- Starring: Charles Durning; Louis Gossett Jr.; Perry King; Clyde Kusatsu; Stephen Macht; Tim McIntire; Randy Quaid; Chuck Sacci; Don Stroud; James Woods; Burt Young
- Cinematography: Joseph Biroc
- Edited by: William Martin; Irving Rosenblum; Maury Winetrobe
- Music by: Frank De Vol
- Production company: Lorimar Productions
- Distributed by: Universal Pictures
- Release date: December 23, 1977
- Running time: 119 minutes
- Country: United States
- Language: English
- Budget: $6,500,000
- Box office: ITL 126,400,000 (Italy) (1980); 292,099 admissions (France)

The Choirboys is a 1977 American neo-noir comedy-drama film directed by Robert Aldrich, written by Christopher Knopf and Joseph Wambaugh based on Wambaugh's 1975 novel of the same name. It features an ensemble cast including Charles Durning, Louis Gossett Jr., Randy Quaid, and James Woods. The film was released to theaters by Universal Pictures on December 23, 1977.

== Plot ==
Officers of the Los Angeles Police Department experiencing various pressures at work unwind at night with drunken get-togethers (a.k.a. "choir practice") at MacArthur Park, where their pranks often go too far: among those there are a retiring cop, a small number of young cops, a bigoted one and a Vietnam War veteran with panic disorder.

== Cast ==
- Charles Durning as "Spermwhale" Whalen
- Louis Gossett Jr. as Calvin Motts
- Perry King as Baxter Slate
- Clyde Kusatsu as Francis Tanaguchi
- Stephen Macht as Spencer Van Moot
- Tim McIntire as Roscoe Rules
- Randy Quaid as Dean Proust
- Chuck Sacci as "Father" Sartino
- Don Stroud as Sam Lyles
- James Woods as Harold Bloomguard
- Burt Young as Sergeant Scuzzi
- Robert Webber as Deputy Chief Riggs
- Jim Davis as Captain Drobeck
- George DiCenzo as Lieutenant Grimsley
- Vic Tayback as Zoony
- Phyllis Davis as Foxy
- Susan Batson as Sabrina
- Cheryl Smith as Tammy
- Barbara Rhoades as "No Balls" Hadley
- Charles Haid as Sergeant Nick Yanov
- Jeannie Bell as Jean

== Production ==
Lorimar purchased the screen rights to the novel in October 1975, before it was published. The price was a reported $700,000. It was Wambaugh's fourth book, third novel and first comedy. The Los Angeles Times called it "brilliant". The book became a best seller.

Wambaugh adapted his own novel into a screenplay. Robert Aldrich signed to direct in February 1976. "The whole $5.3 million is from independent sources," said Wambaugh in November 1976. "No Hollywood studio is involved - they can be as bad as networks."

"When I turned in my first script they said they loved it," said Wambaugh later. "Then there was total silence. I called but they didn't return my calls."

=== Clash with Wambaugh ===
Aldrich wanted changes to the script and hired Christopher Knopft to do them. "I think Mr. Wambaugh is going to be very unhappy with this film of his work," said Aldrich. "I haven't figured out yet how to correct some of the things that are in the book and still make people who read the book want to see the movie - but I do intend to figure it out."

Aldrich said he did not feel the same way as Wambaugh about "the problems of the cop... I don't find the fact that cops can't ‘cope’ particularly rewarding; I can't relate to it. I don't know how to feel sorry for a cop. It's a volunteer force. You're not drafted to become a cop. So you've got to take some of the heat if you don't like what people think about you. After all, that's an extraordinary pension you get in twenty years; nobody else gets it. In fact, I disagree with Wambaugh to such an extent that I don't think people really like cops."

Aldrich said the book "doesn't go far enough for me" for instance not showing them to be racist, taking bribes or wanting to be stormtroopers. "I think you've got to show L. A. cops as brutal as they really are. And Wambaugh can't face that problem, so it's never touched in the book. "

When Wambaugh saw the rewritten script he was not pleased. "They'd mutilated my work," he said.

He took out a full-page advertisement complaining about what had happened to his book and sued to get his name taken off the credits of the final print.

=== Shooting ===
Aldrich rehearsed with the cast prior to filming. "We don't have any superstars," said Aldrich. "The film doesn't need Steve McQueen to carry it."

Filming started 21 March 1977. Aldrich said the film showed how police dealt with pressures but "it won't be all grim, though; there will be some hysterically funny sequences coming out of the love they have for each other."

Charles Durning said he based his character on Aldrich, "one of the brightest guys I know and who never forgets he's the boss."

During filming, one of the cast, Walter McGinn, died in a road accident.

In June 1977, Universal agreed to distribute.

== Reception ==
The film attracted negative reviews and is considered by some to be Aldrich's weakest film. Vincent Canby's review in The New York Times described the film as "cheap and nasty" as well as "a stylistic and narrative mess".

Wambaugh, after seeing the film, called it a "dreadful, slimy, vile film... a sleazy, insidious film. There was no serious intent to it. It was an insult to me but also to every self-respecting cop in America."

He sued Lorimar and was paid $1 million in compensation.

He then bought back the rights to The Onion Field and Black Marble to have more control, because of what happened to The Choirboys.

The Choirboys currently holds a 45% rating on Rotten Tomatoes based on 11 reviews.

== In popular culture ==
In Peter Straub's 1983 novel Floating Dragon, an all-police screening of The Choirboys is a major plot point.

The term "Choir Practice" has worked its way into police slang as an informal meeting after work, alcohol may or may not be involved.
