= The Blue Knight (TV series) =

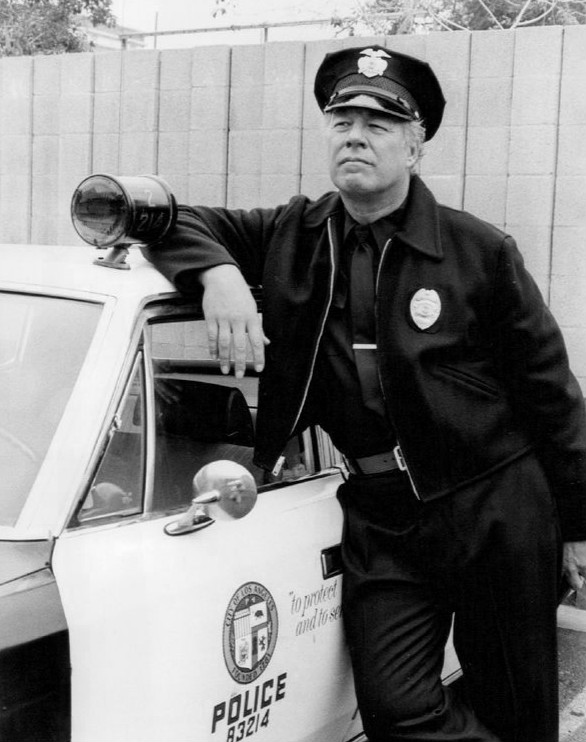
- George Kennedy as Bumper Morgan.
- Genre: Action; Police drama
- Based on: The Blue Knight by Joseph Wambaugh
- Developed by: E. Jack Newman; Albert Ruben
- Starring: George Kennedy
- Theme music composer: Henry Mancini
- Country of origin: United States
- Original language: English
- No. of seasons: 2
- No. of episodes: 23 (6 unaired)

Production
- Executive producers: Lee Rich; Philip Capice
- Running time: 60 minutes (per episode)
- Production company: Lorimar Productions

Original release
- Network: CBS
- Release: December 17, 1975 – October 20, 1976

The Blue Knight is an American crime drama series that was broadcast by CBS from December 17, 1975, until October 20, 1976. It features George Kennedy as Officer Bumper Morgan. The series was based on the 1973 novel of the same name by Joseph Wambaugh and produced by Lorimar Productions. It was also inspired by the 1973 television miniseries The Blue Knight, featuring William Holden, which was broadcast before the series premiered. The series pilot (ninety-minutes, with commercial breaks) premiered May 9, 1975, and the series itself was selected as a mid-season replacement for Kate McShane. Although the series was renewed in 1976, it competed with ABC's Charlie's Angels (for the same market share, in the 10 P.M. EST network time slot).

== Plot ==
Bumper Morgan is a veteran police officer of the Los Angeles Police Department, who continues to patrol the streets in uniform. The series dealt with Morgan's daily dealings with dangerous criminals and drug dealers.

Guest actors included Jim Davis, Bruce Glover, Robert Hays, Robert Hoy, Vivi Janiss, Jeff Goldblum, Harry Lauter, Gerald McRaney, and Lee Weaver. Also appearing (in the last three [unaired] episodes) was Barbara Rhoades as Carrie Williams, Bumper's "lady friend." After being broadcast for seventeen episodes, the series was cancelled by CBS. Six episodes out of the ten produced for its second season were left unaired.

== Episodes ==
=== Pilot (1975) ===
No.	Title	Directed by	Written by	Original release date
Pilot	"The Blue Knight"	J. Lee Thompson	Albert Ruben	May 9, 1975
75-minute pilot episode: Reaching his last week on the force before retirement, Bumper decides to devote his time to searching for a fellow officer's killer. With Alex Rocco, Glynn Turman, Verna Bloom, Michael Margotta, Seth Allen.

=== Season 1 (1975–76) ===
No. overall	No. in season	Title	Directed by	Written by	Original release date
1	1	"Two to Make Deadly"	Paul Krasny	Story by : Don G. Letney; Teleplay by : Don G. Letney & Herman Groves	December 17, 1975
Bumper's beat becomes rife with murder and theft when two hoods decide it would be safer to rob other lawbreakers. With Vic Tayback, Bill Fletcher, Robert DoQui, Morgan Paull, Eddie Firestone, Michael Baseleon, Claire Brennan, Claudia Bryar.
2	2	"Triple Threat"	Ralph Senensky	William T. Gordon, James Doherty	December 24, 1975
Bumper Morgan wounds a suspected mugger, then tangles with the injured man's fiercely protective sister, an attorney who will not believe that her brother is a criminal. With Janet MacLachlan, Carl Crudup, Jonathan Lippe, Paul Comi, Paul Baerrones, Michael O'Keefe, Warren Kemmerling, John Beal.
3	3	"Odds Against Tomorrow"	Daniel Haller	Anthony Lawrence	December 31, 1975
When the mistress of a sadistic crime boss tries to leave him he beats her up, and vice officers ask Bumper Morgan's help in using the incident to persuade the girl to bring them to her long-wanted boyfriend. With Anjanette Comer, Charles Aidman, Ron Harper, Richard Davalos, Hal Bokar, Davis Roberts.
4	4	"A Fashionable Connection"	Unknown	Unknown	January 7, 1976
Bumper discovers that a high style fashion company, owned by a shrewd woman designer, is the front for a smoothly-operated narcotics trade. With Ina Balin, James Canning, Alan Manson, Douglas Dirkson, Vic Mohica, Leigh Christian, Byron Morrow, Bruce Glover.
5	5	"The Cop Killer"	Unknown	Unknown	January 14, 1976
A deranged ex-con, blaming Bumper Morgan for putting him behind bars, hires a killer to carry out his revenge. With Mitchell Ryan, Katherine Helmond, Paul Mantee, Darrell Zwerling, Woodrow Parfrey, Don "Red" Barry, Anna Berger, Art Lund.
6	6	"The Creeper"	Unknown	Unknown	January 28, 1976
Bumper Morgan sets out to track down a mentally deranged hotel sneak thief. With Tony Geary, Suzanne Charny, Ben Frank, Ricky Segall, Charles Sailor, Oliver Clark, Vince Howard, Harry Lauter, Tom Castronova.
7	7	"The Candy Man"	Unknown	Unknown	February 4, 1976
After arresting a major drug pusher, Bumper finds the man is apparently immune to the law when federal narcotics agents put him back on the street. With James A. Watson Jr., Sheila Larken, Skip Homeier, Marc Alaimo, Byron Mabe, Michael Mullins, Kiel Martin, John Milford.
8	8	"Mariachi"	Charles S. Dubin	Earl Wallace	February 11, 1976
The savage beating of an elderly gambler sets Bumper on the trail of a loan shark and his sadistic henchman. With Rodolfo Hoyos, William Smith, Carmen Zapata, Jack Murdock, Jason Wingreen, Richard Beauchamp, Rafael Lopez, Don Hanmer, Ted Gehring, Dee Timberlake.
9	9	"Snitch's Karma"	Unknown	Unknown	February 25, 1976
Eager to catch an elusive thief, Bumper reluctantly uses a small-time hood as an informant. With David Opatoshu, John Lisbon Wood, Jason Bernard, Jonathan Lippe, Jacqueline Scott, Robert Doyle, Mel Novak.
10	10	"A Slower Beat"	Paul Krasny	Walter Dallenbach	March 3, 1976
Gunmen are robbing many people on Bumper Morgan's beat—including his girlfriend—and detectives belittle him. With Lonny Chapman, Edie Adams, Donn Whyte, Mel Scott, Lisa Moore, Jack Somack, Tom Geas, Lew Saunders, Hoke Howell, Stack Pierce.
11	11	"To Kill a Tank"	Unknown	Unknown	March 10, 1976
A dangerous criminal, armed with a stolen anti-tank gun, goes looking for a big score with his reluctant sidekick as Bumper tries to find him. With Jason Ronard Fred Herrick, J. S. Johnson, Lee Weaver, Juno Dawson, Paul Sorensen, Bill Ewing.
12	12	"The Pink Dragon"	Unknown	Unknown	March 24, 1976
Bumper's campaign to close a hangout for crooks pits him against a hood who tries to trap him with a pretty girl. With John Crawford, Jerry Douglas, Rex Holman, Leonard Stone, Joanna Moore, Eunice Christopher, Dennis Olivieri.
13	13	"Everybody Needs a Little Attention"	Unknown	Unknown	March 31, 1976
Bumper demonstrates to his partner that "everybody needs attention" after a massage parlor manager files a false complaint that threatens his badge. With Salome Jens, James Whitmore Jr., Tom Bower, Harold Sakata, Julian Wells, Bob Basso.

=== Season 2 (1976) ===
No. overall	No. in season	Title	Directed by	Written by	Original release date
14	1	"Bull's Eye"	Unknown	E. Arthur Kean	September 22, 1976
A trigger-happy cop forces Bumper into an all-out battle by endangering a valuable informer. With Elisha Cook, Herman Poppe, Charles Siebert, Joshua Shelley, Robert Hays, Gary Lockwood, Nicolas Coster.
15	2	"A Slight Case of Murder"	Alvin Ganzer	Robert C. Dennis	September 29, 1976
Police machinery is hard to stop when evidence points to an old wino as a cop killer. With Douglas V. Fowley, Bill Vint, Ned Romero, Philip Carey, Penelope Milford, Paul Sylvan.
16	3	"Upward Mobility"	Unknown	Unknown	October 13, 1976
Bumper stirs up trouble on his beat when he tries to steer a young girl into a safer life. With P. J. Soles, Tony King, Richard Gilliland, Damu King, Jeff Goldblum, Robert Symonds, Henry Brown, Robert Hays.
17	4	"The Rose and the Gun"	Harvey S. Laidman	Dallas L. Barnes; Joseph Wambaugh	October 20, 1976
An overeager young cop shoots and kills a suspect, then hints that Bumper was afraid to fire.
18	5	"Everything in Life is 3 to 1 Against"	TBD	TBD	Unaired
A retired cop is heavily in debt to a bookmaker Bumper has doggedly tried to shut down.
19	6	"A Matter of Justice"	Harvey S. Laidman	Dallas L. Barnes; Joseph Wambaugh	Unaired
Defying Bumper's warning about taking the law into his own hands, a vigilante goes after a band of hoodlum-robbers who raped his daughter.
20	7	"Great Wall of Chinatown"	TBD	TBD	Unaired
Bumper investigates the shooting death of a Chinese gang leader
21	8	"Point of View"	TBD	TBD	Unaired
Bumper goes back to the Police Academy to take a course designed to update veterans in modern techniques. An ex-con has a job, but an informer says he is in on plans for a big robbery.
22	9	"Throwaway"	TBD	TBD	Unaired
Bumper is relieved from duty while officials investigate his fatal shooting of a hood.
23	10	"Death Echo"	TBD	TBD	Unaired
Bumper tells down-and-out bum Joey to stop disturbing the police when he keeps confessing that he is the one responsible for raping and murdering four women. But when Joey begins to give details which only the cops and the murderer know, Bumper realizes that Joey has become the sounding-board for a maniac.
