= Funny Girl (film) =

1968 film by William Wyler

- Theatrical release poster
- Directed by: William Wyler
- Screenplay by: Isobel Lennart
- Based on: Funny Girl; 1964 musical by: Isobel Lennart; Jule Styne; Bob Merrill
- Produced by: Ray Stark
- Starring: Barbra Streisand; Omar Sharif; Kay Medford; Anne Francis; Mittie Lawrence; Walter Pidgeon
- Cinematography: Harry Stradling
- Edited by: Maury Winetrobe; William Sands; Robert Swink (supervising film editor)
- Music by: Jule Styne; Bob Merrill
- Production company: Rastar
- Distributed by: Columbia Pictures
- Release date: September 18, 1968
- Running time: 149 minutes
- Country: United States
- Language: English
- Budget: $14.1 million
- Box office: $58.7 million

Funny Girl is a 1968 American musical biographical film directed by William Wyler and written by Isobel Lennart, adapted from her book for the stage musical of the same title. It is loosely based on the life and career of comedienne Fanny Brice and her stormy relationship with entrepreneur and gambler Nicky Arnstein.

Produced by Brice's son-in-law Ray Stark (and the first film by his company Rastar), with music and lyrics by Jule Styne and Bob Merrill, the film stars Barbra Streisand (in her film debut reprising her Broadway role) as Brice and Omar Sharif as Arnstein, with a supporting cast featuring Kay Medford (also reprising her Broadway role), Anne Francis, Walter Pidgeon, Lee Allen and Mae Questel.

A major critical and commercial success, Funny Girl became the highest-grossing film of 1968 in the United States and received eight Academy Award nominations at the 41st Academy Awards including Best Picture, with Streisand winning Best Actress. Streisand tied for the award with Katharine Hepburn for The Lion in Winter which marked the first and (as of 2025) only tie to happen in the category's history. In 2006, the American Film Institute ranked the film No. 16 on its list commemorating AFI's Greatest Movie Musicals. Previously it had ranked the film No. 41 in its 2002 list of AFI's 100 Years...100 Passions, the songs "People" and "Don't Rain on My Parade" at No. 13 and No. 46, respectively, in its 2004 list of AFI's 100 Years...100 Songs, and the line "Hello, gorgeous" at No. 81 in its 2005 list of AFI's 100 Years...100 Movie Quotes. Funny Girl is considered one of the greatest musical films ever made.

In 2016, Funny Girl was deemed "culturally, historically, or aesthetically significant" by the United States Library of Congress, and selected for preservation in the National Film Registry.

== Plot ==
Set in and around New York City just before and following World War I, the story opens with Ziegfeld Follies star Fanny Brice awaiting her husband Nicky Arnstein to arrive at the theater, and then moves into an extended flashback focusing on their meeting, marriage, and Fanny's rise to stardom.

Fanny is a stage-struck Jewish teenager who lands her first job in vaudeville. Her mother believes in her but her mother's card-playing friends, including Mrs. Strakosh, try to dissuade Fanny from show business, believing Fanny is not a stage beauty. During a rehearsal, Fanny's boss complains about Fanny's unsynchronized dancing skills and appearance, wanting to fire her. She perseveres and, with some assistance from Eddie, is put in a roller-skating act after falsely claiming she can skate. The performance goes wrong, but the audience thinks that Fanny is hilarious and cheers her singing. After the show, the suave Nicky Arnstein comes backstage to meet Fanny. She finds Nicky handsome and charming, but declines his invitation for dinner.

Fanny's dream is realized when, six months later, she is hired for the Ziegfeld Follies. In her debut performance, Fanny is cast as the beautiful bride in a romantic musical number. Uncomfortable about her looks, she adds a comic twist by appearing pregnant in the wedding gown. An angry Ziegfeld wants to fire Fanny but the audience loves the hilarious act. He tells her to play it that way every performance. Nicky Arnstein appears and congratulates Fanny on her success, then accompanies her to the Brice family celebration.

Within a year, Fanny is a Broadway star. While on tour, she runs into Nicky in Baltimore. During a romantic dinner, they declare their mutual romantic feelings. The reunion is cut short after Nicky's racehorse loses a big race, leaving him broke. To make money, Nicky heads for Europe to gamble during the voyage. Fanny impulsively quits the tour and rushes back to New York to join him. A tugboat takes her to Nicky's ship, which just left port. Nicky is delighted to see Fanny. During the trip, Nicky wins a fortune playing poker. The two eventually marry and move into a mansion and soon have a daughter. Fanny later returns to the Ziegfeld Follies.

When Nicky's various business ventures fail, he resorts to gambling to recoup his losses. This causes him to miss Fanny's new premiere, further straining their marriage. Fanny's mother tells an unknowing Fanny about Nicky's dire financial situation and advises her to "love him less and help him more". Nicky is offered a lucrative business venture, but he quickly realizes Fanny is secretly financing the deal and rejects it. He instead becomes involved in a bonds scam. The next day, before a matinee performance, Florenz Ziegfeld informs Fanny that Nicky was arrested for embezzlement. He advises her not to attend the court hearing, which suggestion she defies, and leaves the theater. At the court hearing, Nicky says nothing in his defense, and instead, the judge sees him in his chambers, where Nicky is given an 18-month sentence for embezzlement. Nicky and Fanny are allowed a few minutes in private, in the judge's office, to say goodbye, where Nicky tells Fanny to "keep on being a Funny Girl", before his incarceration.

The film shifts back to the present timeline as Fanny nervously awaits Nicky's return from prison. Nicky arrives, and, after a bittersweet reunion, the two agree to separate, leaving Fanny heartbroken.

== Cast ==
- Barbra Streisand as Fanny Brice
- Omar Sharif as Nicky Arnstein
- Kay Medford as Rose Brice
- Anne Francis as Georgia James
- Walter Pidgeon as Florenz Ziegfeld
- Lee Allen as Eddie Ryan
- Mae Questel as Mrs. Strakosh
- Gerald Mohr as Branca (in his last feature film appearance)
- Frank Faylen as Keeney
- Mittie Lawrence as Emma
- Gertrude Flynn as Mrs. O'Malley
- Penny Santon as Mrs. Meeker
- John Harmon as a company manager
- Ruth Clifford as a maid (uncredited)
- Sharon Vaughn (voice dubbed by Betty Wand) as a maid (uncredited)

== Production ==
=== Development ===
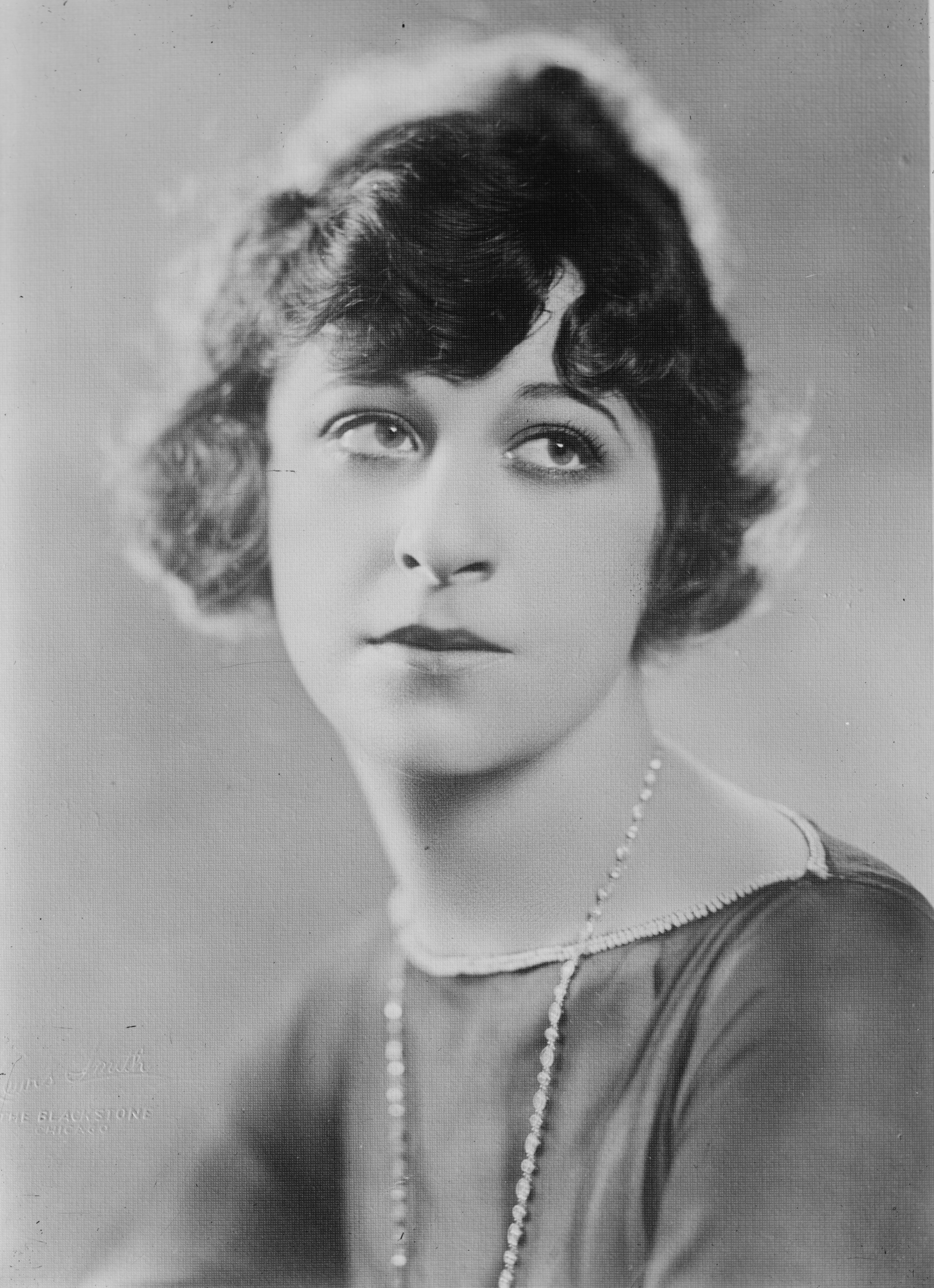
The film is based on the life and love story of Fanny Brice.

Isobel Lennart originally wrote Funny Girl as a screenplay for a drama film titled My Man for producer Ray Stark (whose mother-in-law was Fanny Brice). No studio or producers were interested in the project except for Vincent Donhue, who suggested turning it into a stage musical. Lennart consequently adapted her script for what eventually became a successful Broadway production starring Barbra Streisand.

Although she had not made any films, Streisand was Stark's first and only choice to portray Brice onscreen. "I just felt she was too much a part of Fanny, and Fanny was too much a part of Barbra to have it go to someone else," he said, but Columbia Pictures executives wanted Shirley MacLaine in the role. MacLaine and Streisand were good friends and shared a birthday; both actresses rolled their eyes at the idea. Stark insisted if Streisand were not cast, he would not allow a film to be made, and the studio agreed to his demand.

Mike Nichols, George Roy Hill, and Gene Kelly were considered to direct the film, then Sidney Lumet was signed. After working on pre-production for six months, he left the project due to "creative differences" and was replaced by William Wyler, whose long and illustrious career never had included a musical film. Wyler initially declined Stark's offer because he was concerned his significant hearing loss would affect his ability to work on a musical. After giving it some thought, he told Stark "If Beethoven could write his Eroica Symphony, then William Wyler can do a musical."

Streisand never had heard of Wyler, and when she was told he had won the Academy Award for Best Director for Ben-Hur, she said "Chariots! How is he with people, like women? Is he any good with actresses?" Wyler had directed Roman Holiday (1953), which won three Academy Awards, including the Best Actress award for Audrey Hepburn who had been chosen by Wyler despite her relative obscurity at that time. Wyler said "I wouldn't have done the picture without her." Her enthusiasm reminded him of Bette Davis, and he felt she "represented a challenge for me because she's never been in films, and she's not the usual glamour girl".

=== Casting ===
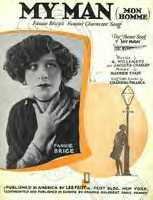
In the film's finale, Streisand sings "My Man", a tune closely associated with Fanny Brice

Styne wanted Frank Sinatra for the role of Nicky Arnstein, but the actor was willing to appear in the film only if the role was expanded and new songs were added for the character. Stark thought Sinatra was too old and preferred someone with more class like Cary Grant, even though Grant was 11 years older than Sinatra. Marlon Brando, Gregory Peck, Sean Connery, David Janssen, and James Garner were also considered. Egyptian Omar Sharif was cast to star opposite the Jewish Streisand after Wyler noticed him having lunch in the studio commissary. When the Six-Day War between Israel and Egypt broke out, studio executives considered replacing Sharif, but both Wyler and Streisand threatened to quit if they did. Later, the publication of a still depicting a love scene between Fanny and Nicky in the Egyptian press prompted a movement to revoke Sharif's citizenship. When asked about the controversy, Streisand replied, "You think Cairo got upset? You should see the letter I got from my Aunt Rose!" Anne Francis was cast in a new role as the lead chorus line dancer in the Ziegfeld Follies.

Wyler allegedly purposefully cast two leading stars known for their romantic propensities, hoping to create a lustfulness that would amplify the dynamic on-screen. Sharif was single at the time and Streisand was on the downslope of her marriage to Elliott Gould. Wyler crafted various scenarios to foment romantic impulses between the two stars; one such tactic was to place Streisand's trailer window in direct, but hidden view of Sharif's. One of Wyler's assistants later gave Sharif the go-ahead to use the on-set shower while Streisand was still using it. These stratagems bore the fruit Wyler intended. An affair did indeed take place between Sharif and Streisand for the duration of filming. Due to the Egyptian-Israeli War, the liaison earned intense disapproval from Streisand's family.

Choreographer Herbert Ross, who staged the musical numbers, had worked with Streisand in I Can Get It for You Wholesale, her Broadway debut.

=== Filming ===
It doesn't matter how much expensive gear you've got, you need to have not a little luck, a great deal of skill, and a telepathic relationship between pilot and cameraman to pull that off. And Nelson Tyler pulled all that off right back in the mid-sixties.

— Jerry Grayson on the helicopter shot for "Don't Rain on My Parade"

Rehearsals and pre-recording of the songs began in July 1967. During pre-recording, Streisand had demanded extensive retakes until she was satisfied with them, and on the set she continued to display her perfectionist nature, frequently arguing with Wyler about costumes and photography. Streisand has since rebutted this in her 2023 memoir, where she argues that she loved to collaborate with Wyler, and that the media exaggerated these reports.

Principal photography began in August 1967 and was completed by December. Streisand's first scene was set at an abandoned rail depot in New Jersey where she had just got off the train and was posing for the photographers. A difficulty of filming that Barbra did not anticipate was that she had to do musical numbers multiple times for different camera angles. For the helicopter shot of "Don't Rain on My Parade", aerial photographer Nelson Tyler had to develop a special helicopter camera rig. Allegedly, so many of Streisand's scenes with Anne Francis were cut before the film's release that Francis sued to have her name removed from the credits, but lost. Streisand later claimed she never told Wyler to cut anything and that the final film reflected his choices, not hers. Francis later said "I have no feud with Barbra. But doing that film was like Gaslight. What infuriated me was the way they did things—never telling me, never talking to me, just cutting. I think they were afraid that if they were nice to me, Barbra would have been upset." Shooting for the musical number "My Man", which the original Fanny Brice made famous, took place at the end of the shooting phase. Sharif was present to help Streisand get emotional and build up sadness. The crew did at least ten takes. Also in that shoot, Stark thought the film would cost $8 million, which he deemed to be "half as much as any other big musical...and it will be twice as big."

== Music ==
1. "Overture"
2. "I'm the Greatest Star" – Fanny
3. "If a Girl Isn't Pretty" – Mrs. Strakosh, Rose and Fanny
4. "Rollerskate Rag" – Fanny and Rollerskate Girls
5. "I'd Rather Be Blue Over You (Than Happy With Somebody Else)" – Fanny
6. "His Love Makes Me Beautiful" – Fanny and Follies Ensemble
7. "People" – Fanny
8. "You Are Woman, I Am Man" – Nicky and Fanny
9. "Don't Rain on My Parade" – Fanny
10. "Entr'acte"
11. "Sadie, Sadie" – Fanny and Nicky
12. "The Swan" – Fanny
13. "Funny Girl" – Fanny
14. "My Man" – Fanny
15. "Exit Music"

Funny Girl originally had 18 musical numbers in 160 minutes of film, 60 minutes of which are tuned. Arnstein used to have a solo called "Temporary Arrangement". Seven numbers from the original musical production were removed, while "Rollerskate Rag", "The Swan" and "Funny Girl" are composed specifically for Streisand and are unrelated to Brice.

Although originally released on her 1964 album People, the song "People" was re-recorded for the film with a different tempo and additional lyrics. Because "My Man", "Second Hand Rose" and "I'd Rather Be Blue" were frequent in Brice's career, they were interpolated into the score.

In the 1985 book Barbra Streisand: The Woman, the Myth, the Music by Shaun Considine, Styne revealed he was unhappy with the film's orchestrations. "They were going for pop arrangements," he recalled. "They dropped eight songs from the Broadway show and we were asked to write some new ones. They didn't want to go with success. It was the old-fashioned MGM Hollywood way of doing a musical. They always change things to their way of vision, and they always do it wrong. But, of all my musicals they screwed up, Funny Girl came out the best."

=== Soundtrack ===
The soundtrack album to the film was released by Columbia Records in 1968.

== Release ==
Before release, Columbia Pictures produced three featurettes for publicity – "This Is Streisand", "Barbra in Movieland" and "The Look of Funny Girl".

=== Box office ===
Funny Girl premiered on September 18, 1968, at the Criterion Theatre in New York; the ticket cost $100. It was Streisand's first premiere as a movie star, and she said she felt like a "kid with a plaything". The Hollywood premiere was held on October 9, 1968, at the Egyptian Theatre. Having grossed $24.9 million, Funny Girl was the highest-grossing film of 1968 in the United States.

== Critical reception ==
The film holds a 95% approval rating on Rotten Tomatoes, based on 55 reviews, with an average rating of 7.6/10. The website's critical consensus states: "Barbra Streisand elevates this otherwise rote melodramatic musical with her ultra-memorable star turn as Fanny Brice." On Metacritic, it has an 89 out of 100 rating, based on seven critics, indicating "universal acclaim". Streisand was widely praised by critics, with The New Yorker's Pauline Kael calling it "A bravura performance...As Fanny Brice, she has the wittiest comic inflections since the comediennes of the 30s; she makes written dialogue sound like inspired improvisation...Streisand's triumphant talent rides right over the film's weaknesses." In his review in Chicago Sun-Times, Roger Ebert called Streisand "magnificent" and added "She has the best timing since Mae West, and is more fun to watch than anyone since the young Katharine Hepburn. She doesn't actually sing a song at all; she acts it. She does things with her hands and face that are simply individual; that's the only way to describe them. They haven't been done before. She sings, and you're really happy you're there." But he thought "the film itself is perhaps the ultimate example of the roadshow musical gone overboard. It is over-produced, over-photographed and over-long. The second half drags badly. The supporting characters are generally wooden . . . That makes the movie itself kind of schizo. It is impossible to praise Miss Streisand too highly; hard to find much to praise about the rest of the film." Richard L. Coe of The Washington Post agreed that the film was "overdone," writing that Streisand was "her first-rate self" during the musical numbers and "probably is capable of more variety than this," but "is so carefully presented and limited that she and the picture become a long, drippy bore." Renata Adler of The New York Times wrote that "Streisand's talent is very poignant and strong," but that the film had "something a little condescending about it," with Wyler "treating Barbra rather fondly, improbably and even patronizingly," and concluded that "Miss Streisand doesn't need any of this."

Variety wrote Streisand makes "a marked impact...The saga of the tragi-comedienne Fanny Brice of the ungainly mien and manner, charmed by the suave card-sharp Nicky Arnstein, is perhaps of familiar pattern, but it is to the credit of all concerned that it plays so convincingly."

Jan Dawson of The Monthly Film Bulletin wrote "The story of the actress whose dramatic rise from rags to riches is accompanied by the discovery that suffering lies on the flip-side of success has provided the basis of many an American musical. But William Wyler manages to transcend the clichés of the genre and create—largely through Barbra Streisand's characterisation of Fanny Brice—a dramatic comedy in which the musical numbers illustrate the public aspect of the star's life without once interrupting the narrative."

David Parkinson of Empire rated the film four out of five stars in a retrospective review and called it "one of those films where it doesn't really matter what gets written here – you will have made your mind up about Babs one way or the other, but for the rare uninitiated, this is a fine introduction to her talents." It is Funny Girl that made Streisand a movie star, although it also gave her the reputation for being perfectionist and 'difficult'. According to film historian Jeanine Basinger, this film helped Streisand to be regarded as a "funny girl" in her own way, and not another actress who played Fanny Brice.

== Awards and honors ==
Funny Girl garnered 8 Academy Award nominations, with Streisand winning Best Actress for her film debut. In an Academy Award rarity that has never been repeated, Streisand's win was a tie vote with Katharine Hepburn, who also won for The Lion in Winter at the 41st Academy Awards. Along with Columbia's other Best Picture nominee and eventual winner Oliver!, the studio secured a combined total of 19 Academy Award nominations, the most nominations for musicals from one studio in a year. Streisand won Best Actress at the Golden Globe Awards, while Funny Girl garnered three additional nominations.

Award	Category	Nominee(s)	Result	Ref.
Academy Awards	Best Picture	Ray Stark	Nominated	
Academy Awards	Best Actress	Barbra Streisand	Won (Note: Tied with Katharine Hepburn for The Lion in Winter.)	
Academy Awards	Best Supporting Actress	Kay Medford	Nominated	
Academy Awards	Best Cinematography	Harry Stradling	Nominated	
Academy Awards	Best Film Editing	Robert Swink, Maury Winetrobe, and William Sands	Nominated	
Academy Awards	Best Score of a Musical Picture – Original or Adaptation	Walter Scharf	Nominated	
Academy Awards	Best Song – Original for the Picture	"Funny Girl"; Music by Jule Styne; Lyrics by Bob Merrill	Nominated	
Academy Awards	Best Sound	Columbia Studio Sound Department	Nominated	
American Cinema Editors Awards	Best Edited Feature Film	Robert Swink, Maury Winetrobe, and William Sands	Nominated	
British Academy Film Awards	Best Actress in a Leading Role	Barbra Streisand	Nominated	
British Academy Film Awards	Best Cinematography	Harry Stradling	Nominated	
British Academy Film Awards	Best Costume Design	Irene Sharaff	Nominated	
David di Donatello Awards	Best Foreign Actress	Barbra Streisand	Won (Note: Tied with Mia Farrow for Rosemary's Baby.)	
Directors Guild of America Awards	Outstanding Directorial Achievement in Motion Pictures	William Wyler	Nominated	
Golden Globe Awards	Best Motion Picture – Musical or Comedy		Nominated	
Golden Globe Awards	Best Actress in a Motion Picture – Musical or Comedy	Barbra Streisand	Won	
Golden Globe Awards	Best Director – Motion Picture	William Wyler	Nominated	
Golden Globe Awards	Best Original Song – Motion Picture	"Funny Girl"; Music by Jule Styne; Lyrics by Bob Merrill	Nominated	
Laurel Awards	Top Road Show		Won	
Laurel Awards	Top Female Comedy Performance	Barbra Streisand	Won	
Laurel Awards	Top Female Supporting Performance	Kay Medford	Nominated	
National Film Preservation Board	National Film Registry		Inducted	
Society of Operating Cameramen	Historical Shot	Nelson Tyler	Won	
Writers Guild of America Awards	Best Written American Musical	Isobel Lennart	Won	

== Home media ==
A newly restored transfer of the film was released on DVD on October 23, 2001. A Blu-ray edition released on April 30, 2013, with the same bonus material as the DVD. The Blu-ray was concurrent with Streisand's then recent film The Guilt Trip. The Criterion Collection released the film on Ultra HD Blu-ray and a remastered Blu-ray on November 19, 2024.

== Legacy ==
=== Jewish representation ===
In her book Talking Back: Images of Jewish Women in American Popular Culture, Joyce Antler writes that Streisand has created several rich images of a Jewish woman within film, Funny Girl being one of them. In Funny Girl, Antler writes

Streisand is able to portray a character that is obviously Jewish, and in this role she creates a space for the intelligent Jewish woman to be depicted. In this role the Jewish woman was presented as smart, comedic, beautiful and talented.

During the time the film was made, Jewish women had the stereotype of being dependent upon men, yet Streisand tends to defy this stereotype.

=== "Hello, gorgeous" ===
"Hello, gorgeous" are the first words uttered by Streisand in the film. At the 41st Academy Awards ceremony, upon winning the Academy Award for Best Actress Streisand's first comment when handed the Oscar statuette was to look at the Oscar and say "Hello, gorgeous."

Since release, "Hello, gorgeous" has been referenced in several films. The line appeared as the name of the salon where Michelle Pfeiffer's character worked in Married to the Mob. The line was also uttered by the character Max Bialystock in the 1967 film The Producers and its Broadway adaptation, but the inflection used by Zero Mostel is different from that used by Streisand. The line is also regularly peppered through popular culture.

Sean Harris may be known for playing darker characters in series such as Southcliffe or The Borgias, but he says that he was inspired to become an actor when he saw Barbra Streisand in Funny Girl.

In 2005, the line was chosen as No. 81 on the American Film Institute list, AFI's 100 Years...100 Movie Quotes.

== Sequel ==
In 1975, Streisand reprised her role of Brice with James Caan as Brice's third husband, impresario Billy Rose, in the sequel Funny Lady. Production began in April 1974, and the film premiered in March 1975 to mixed reviews from critics.

== See also ==
- Rose of Washington Square, a 1939 film musical which was an unauthorized fictionalization of the Brice–Arnstein story
- List of American films of 1968
