= Lines and Shadows =

- First edition
- Author: Joseph Wambaugh
- Cover artist: Paul Bacon
- Language: English
- Publisher: William Morrow & Co
- Publication date: 1984
- Publication place: United States
- Media type: Print
- Pages: 383 pp
- ISBN: 0-688-02619-2

Lines and Shadows is a 1984 nonfiction book by Joseph Wambaugh, a former police officer with the Los Angeles Police Department, chronicling the activities of the Border Crime Task Force of the San Diego Police Department between October 1976 and April 1978.
