= William Sands (film editor) =

American film editor

- Born: November 1, 1929; The Bronx, New York, U.S.
- Died: March 1, 2018 (aged 88); Las Vegas, Nevada, U.S.
- Occupation: Film editor

William Sands (November 1, 1929 – March 1, 2018) was an American film editor. He was nominated for an Academy Award in the category Best Film Editing for the film Funny Girl.

Sands died on March 1, 2018, in Las Vegas, Nevada, at the age of 88.

== Selected filmography ==
- Funny Girl (1968; co-nominated with Robert Swink and Maury Winetrobe)
