= The Glitter Dome =

1984 crime drama film

- theatrical poster
- Genre: Action; Comedy; Crime; Drama
- Based on: The Glitter Dome by Joseph Wambaugh
- Written by: Joseph Wambaugh
- Screenplay by: Stanley Kalis
- Directed by: Stuart Margolin
- Starring: James Garner; Margot Kidder; John Lithgow
- Music by: Stuart Margolin
- Country of origin: United States
- Original language: English

Production
- Producer: Frank Konigsberg
- Production locations: Vancouver; Victoria, British Columbia
- Cinematography: Michael W. Watkins; Jon Kranhouse
- Editor: M.S. Martin
- Running time: 97 minutes
- Production companies: HBO Premiere Films; Telepictures Productions

Original release
- Network: HBO
- Release: November 18, 1984

The Glitter Dome is a 1984 American made-for-HBO crime drama film starring James Garner, Margot Kidder and John Lithgow. The film, based on the 1981 Joseph Wambaugh Hollywood-set homicide novel of the same name, was directed by Stuart Margolin, who also scored the film and played a supporting part. The movie was filmed in Victoria, British Columbia and co-starred Colleen Dewhurst. It was subsequently released on video in 1985.

== Synopsis ==
The Glitter Dome is a bar frequented by the Hollywood police detective division (the name is a slang reference to Hollywood). When the investigation of a high-profile studio president is going nowhere, the case is handed over to two experienced detectives, Al Mackey (James Garner) and Marty Welborn (John Lithgow). For this case, however, they need help, which they receive from a pair of vice cops called the Ferret and the Weasel and a pair of street cops commonly referred to as the Street Monsters, due to their fondness for violence.

== Cast ==
- James Garner as Sergeant Aloysius Mackey
- Margot Kidder as Willie
- John Lithgow as Sergeant Marty Wellborn
- John Marley as Captain Woofer
- Stuart Margolin as Herman Sinclair
- Paul Koslo as Griswold Veals
- Colleen Dewhurst as Lorna Dillman
- Alek Diakun as "Weasel"
- Billy Kerr as "Ferret"
- William S. Taylor as "Hand"
- Dusty Morean as Phipps
- Christianne Hirt as Jill
- Tom McBeath as Farrell
- Dixie Seatle as Grace "Amazing Grace"
- Dawn Luker as Gladys
- Harvey Miller as Harvey Himmelfarb
- Enid Saunders as Eleanor St. Denis
- Alistair MacDuff as Malcolm Sinclair
- Max Martini as Steven
- Benson Fong as Wing
- Dale Wilson as Lloyd / Bozeman
