= Joseph Wambaugh =

American writer and policeman (1937–2025)

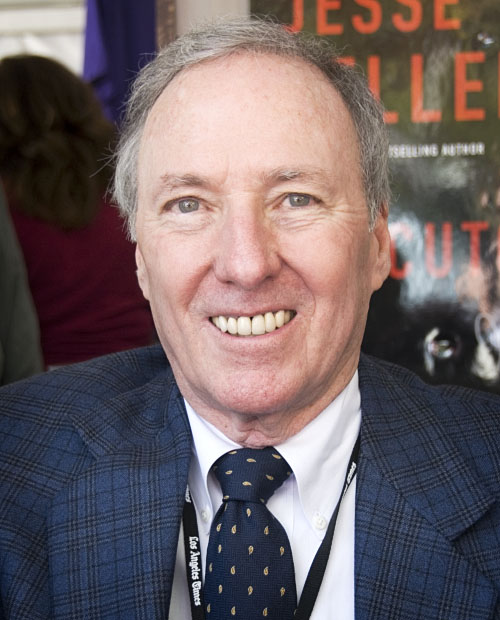
- Wambaugh in 2010
- Born: Joseph Aloysius Wambaugh Jr. January 22, 1937; East Pittsburgh, Pennsylvania, U.S.
- Died: February 28, 2025 (aged 88); Rancho Mirage, California, U.S.
- Education: Chaffey College (AA); Cal State LA (BA, MA)
- Occupation: Writer
- Spouse: Dee Allsup (m. 1955)
- Children: 3
- Writing career
- Years active: 1971–2012
- Genre: Mystery
- Subjects: Non-fiction crime Police procedural
- Notable awards: Edgar Allan Poe Award (1974, 1981, 2003); Grand Master Award (2004)
- Military career
- Branch: United States Marine Corps
- Service years: 1954–1957
- Police career
- Country: United States
- Department: Los Angeles Police Department
- Service years: 1960–1974
- Rank: Patrolman; Detective sergeant

Joseph Aloysius Wambaugh Jr. (January 22, 1937 – February 28, 2025) was an American writer known for his fictional and nonfictional accounts of police work in the United States. Many of his novels are set in Los Angeles and its surroundings and feature Los Angeles police officers as protagonists. He won three Edgar Awards, and was named a Grand Master by the Mystery Writers of America.

== Early life ==
Wambaugh was born in East Pittsburgh, Pennsylvania, on January 22, 1937, the son of Anne (Malloy) and Joseph Aloysius Wambaugh, a police officer. His family moved to Fontana, California, when he was a teenager. He graduated from Chaffey High School in Ontario, California. He joined the U.S. Marine Corps at age 17 and married Dee Allsup at 18. Wambaugh was of Irish and German descent.

== Police career ==
Wambaugh received an associate of arts degree from Chaffey College and joined the Los Angeles Police Department (LAPD) in 1960. He served for 14 years, rising from patrolman to detective sergeant. He also attended Cal State Los Angeles, where he earned BA and MA degrees. While serving on the force, Wambaugh was partnered with Richard E. Kalk, whom Wambaugh would later put in his movies, including The Onion Field and The New Centurions. After retiring, Kalk went on to found the LAPD Museum in Los Angeles and become a writer, publishing a collection of Nick Blaine Mysteries, starting with Measured Deception in 2024.

== Writing career ==
Wambaugh's perspective on police work led to his first novel, The New Centurions, which was published early in 1971 while Wambaugh was still a detective. He later quipped that suspects would ask for his autograph.

Soon turning to writing full time, Wambaugh mixed writing novels (The Blue Knight, The Choirboys, The Black Marble) with nonfiction accounts of crime and detection (true crime): The Onion Field. His later books included The Glitter Dome (a TV-movie adaptation that starred James Garner and John Lithgow), The Delta Star, and Lines and Shadows.

Beginning with The Black Marble in 1977, Wambaugh included satirical observations of the Southern California "rich and famous" lifestyle. The Black Marble parodied dog shows and the fading lifestyle of "old" Pasadena. The Glitter Dome explored the pornographic film industry, The Delta Star delved into the Nobel Prize and scientific research, and The Secrets of Harry Bright savaged the Palm Springs lifestyle of wealthy people. The Golden Orange was set in Orange County while Finnegan's Week was set in San Diego; and Floaters was set in San Diego.

In 1992, Wambaugh generated controversy with his nonfiction book Echoes in the Darkness, based on the murder of Susan Reinert, a teacher in the Upper Merion School District in suburban Philadelphia, Pennsylvania. Critics alleged that the author paid prosecutors in the trial of principal Jay C. Smith to funnel information to him before an arrest was made. Smith's conviction was overturned by the Pennsylvania Supreme Court on the grounds that the prosecution hid the existence of sand that could have supported Smith's case. The chief investigator, John J. Holtz of the Pennsylvania State Police, later admitted having accepted $50,000 from author Wambaugh. Smith sued the police for collusion to falsely convict him, but lost after a federal appeals court concluded that despite his release, evidence of his guilt remained overwhelming. The earlier murder conviction of Smith's alleged co-conspirator, William Bradfield, remained undisturbed. Bradfield died in prison.

One of Wambaugh's most known nonfiction books is The Blooding, which tells the story behind an early landmark case in which DNA fingerprinting helped solve two murders in Leicester, England. The DNA evidence resulted in the arrest and conviction of Colin Pitchfork.

In the 2000s, Wambaugh also began teaching screenwriting courses as a guest lecturer for the theater department at the University of California, San Diego. In 2003, Fire Lover: A True Story brought Wambaugh his second Edgar Award, for Best Crime Fact book. In 2004, he received an MWA Grand Master Award.

=== Hollywood Station series ===
In 2006, Wambaugh returned to fiction with the publication of Hollywood Station, set in the summer of 2006. It was his first novel since Floaters (1996) – and his first to depict the officers and detectives of LAPD since The Delta Star (1983). In 2008, he followed it with Hollywood Crows, a sequel featuring Hollywood Division Community Relations Officers ("Crows") that featured many of the same characters. This was followed by Hollywood Moon in 2009, Hollywood Hills in 2010, and Harbor Nocturne in 2012, set in successive calendar years and involving officers of Hollywood Station's midwatch (5:00 pm to 3:00 am). He retired from writing afterward, saying in 2020 he was "too old" to author another book.

The incidents in which the various police characters are involved are based in part on anecdotes Wambaugh collects from working police officers.

=== Film and television adaptations ===
Many of his books were made into feature films or TV movies during the 1970s and 1980s. The New Centurions was a theatrical film starring George C. Scott released in 1972. The Blue Knight, a novel following the approaching retirement and last working days of aging veteran beat cop "Bumper" Morgan, was made into an Emmy-winning 1973 TV miniseries starring William Holden. It was also adapted as a short-lived TV series starring George Kennedy. Wambaugh made a brief appearance in the pilot as a desk sergeant.

Wambaugh was also involved with creating/developing the NBC series Police Story, which ran from 1973 to 1978. The anthology show covered the different aspects of police work (patrol, detective, undercover, etc.) in the LAPD, with story ideas and characters supposedly inspired by off-the-record talks with actual police officers. At times, the show's characters also dealt with problems not usually seen or associated with typical TV cop shows, such as alcohol abuse, adultery, and brutality. Wambaugh appeared in his second brief acting role in the second-season episode "Incident in the Kill Zone". The show had a brief revival on ABC during the 1988–1989 season.

Wambaugh wrote the screenplay for the film versions of The Onion Field (1979) and The Black Marble (1980), both directed by Harold Becker. In 1981, he won an Edgar Award from the Mystery Writers of America for his screenplay for the latter film. The Choirboys film adaptation had met with poor critical and audience reception a few years earlier. All three films featured performances by then up-and-coming actor James Woods.

The Glitter Dome, which starred James Garner, John Lithgow, and Margot Kidder, was a 1984 film for HBO.

Fugitive Nights was made into a 1993 feature film of the same title.

== Personal life and death ==
Wambaugh and his wife, Dee, had three children, one of whom died in a car crash in 1984. Wambaugh died from esophageal cancer at his home in Rancho Mirage, California, on February 28, 2025, at the age of 88.

== Works ==
=== Novels ===
- The New Centurions (1971)
- The Blue Knight (1972)
- The Choirboys (1975)
- The Black Marble (1978)
- The Glitter Dome (1981)
- The Delta Star (1983)
- The Secrets of Harry Bright (1985)
- The Golden Orange (1990)
- Fugitive Nights: Danger in the Desert (1992)
- Finnegan's Week (1993)
- Floaters (1996)

Hollywood Station series

- Hollywood Station (2006)
- Hollywood Crows (2008)
- Hollywood Moon (2009)
- Hollywood Hills (2010)
- Harbor Nocturne (2012)

=== Non-fiction ===
- The Onion Field (1973)
- Lines and Shadows (1984)
- Echoes in the Darkness (1984)
- The Blooding: The True Story of the Narborough Village Murders (1989)
- Fire Lover: A True Story (2002)
