= The New Centurions (novel) =

1971 novel by Joseph Wambaugh

- First edition cover
- Author: Joseph Wambaugh
- Language: English
- Genre: Detective novel
- Publisher: Little, Brown and Company
- Publication date: January 30, 1971
- Publication place: United States
- Media type: Print (Hardcover)
- Pages: 384 pp
- ISBN: 0-316-92145-9

The New Centurions is a 1971 novel by American writer Joseph Wambaugh. It explores the stresses of police work in Los Angeles, California, in the early 1960s. The author wrote the novel, his first, while he was still a working member of the Los Angeles Police Department (LAPD). The novel was later adapted as a film of the same name in 1972, starring George C. Scott and Stacy Keach.

== Plot summary ==
The novel is basically without plot, instead episodically depicting the psychological changes in three LAPD officers caused by their police work, and particularly the nature of police work in poor minority communities of Los Angeles. The three officers, Serge Duran, Gus Plebesly, and Roy Fehler, are classmates at the police academy in the summer of 1960, and the novel examines their lives each August of succeeding years, culminating in their on-the-job reunion during the Watts riots of August 1965.

The New Centurions is likely the most autobiographical of Wambaugh's novels. He provides a straightforward narration of events with little use of flashback. Each chapter is written in the third person from the point of view of one of the three protagonists. They have no contact with each other once they graduate from the academy, but their paths are similar and converging. Like Wambaugh, his protagonists move from a few years of uniformed patrol in minority districts to plainclothes assignments in juvenile and vice work, experiences which so affected Wambaugh that he returns to them repeatedly as plot elements in his fiction.

Wambaugh also explores the officers' private lives, noting adultery, alcoholism, racism, and suicide as rampant in the ranks of the LAPD. Police suicide, in particular, is a theme Wambaugh explores in nearly all of his books.

A major theme explored throughout the book is what traits characterize a veteran officer, and how a rookie acquires them. Wambaugh consistently compares the attitudes of the new officers (one is not considered a veteran in the LAPD until one's fifth anniversary on the job) to those of the older entrenched men.

== Character synopsis ==
=== Serge Duran ===
Like Wambaugh, Duran came to the LAPD from the U.S. Marines, joining in 1954 right out of high school. Although Duran is a Chicano, he is described as having fair features and being tall. He speaks little Spanish. His first assignment is as uniformed patrol in Hollenbeck Division in East LA, and he resentfully notices that all the Chicanos in his class have been sent there.

Duran is soon forced to confront his ethnicity, which he has hidden since leaving Chino to join the Marines. At first, he rationalizes why he does not want to be taken as Hispanic, but is increasingly uncomfortable with his self-denial. While working Hollywood Division for a few months in 1962 before returning to Hollenbeck, Duran begins to see East LA in a new light, as a comfortable place where people are what they seem to be. Teamed with an older but passive and unambitious officer after his return, Duran is pleased to learn that his patrol partner recommended him for a detective position investigating felonies in the Chicano division.

Duran settles into a routine in Hollenbeck, goes through relatively meaningless personal relationships, and becomes a Juvenile Division detective to avoid a transfer and to improve his resumé. Wambaugh places much of the narrative around Duran in Mexican restaurants. In his favorite diner, Duran falls in love with the young Mexican waitress Mariana Paloma, who finally brings him to come to grips with his ethnicity.

Of the three central characters, Duran is the least complex and well-delineated, possibly reflecting Wambaugh's difficulty in conveying ethnicity. Duran has the most vivid episodes in the novel's climax. He appears to be the character whom Wambaugh chooses to re-enact events that Wambaugh had undergone.

=== Gus Plebesly ===
Plebesly is middle class and suburban in upbringing, from Azusa. He married young and at 22 has two children. He worked in a bank before joining the LAPD, has earned a few college credits, but sought a job with higher status and better pay. Short and slim, Plebesly just passed the height and weight minima required of applicants, but is a natural athlete and a distance runner.

His first assignment tests his hidden fear of being a coward. Although he performed well in both physical training and defensive tactics at the academy, Plebesly is doubtful of his ability to defeat an opponent in a physical confrontation. His assignment to University Division (now LAPD's "Southwest Area") intensifies his fears. University is more than 90% black in population and has a high crime rate, both conditions outside his experience.

Plebesly is fortunate in that his first partner is the thoughtful and pragmatic veteran Andy Kilvinsky. He is featured only briefly, but is a crucial character. Close to retirement (which he refers to as "pulling the pin"), Klivinsky takes Plebesly under his wing to make into an extension of himself. He gives Plebesly a cram course in being a good cop, overcoming his self-doubts, and trusting his innate common sense. He warns Plebesly that the intensity of crime in University makes a year there the equivalent of 10 years in any other. Always offering insights from his personal philosophy, Kilvinsky likens the role of LAPD cops to that of centurions during the early decline of the Roman Empire, but Kilvinsky also represents a warning, as he has focused on work, and long-divorced, not just from his wife but the rest of his family, as well.

After two years, Plebesly becomes a veteran, breaking in new rookies using the words and examples of Kilvinsky, now retired and living alone in Oregon. University Division has become more tense and dangerous than ever and the center of Black Muslim challenges to white authority. Plebesly has observed decent young officers like Rantlee becoming racist, apparently helpless to stop their changes. He can absorb what he witnesses, but does not fall subject to the same bias.

Feeling he married too young, he feels trapped in his marriage. The frequency of divorce among his peers bothers him, and when he takes an interest in another woman, his female partner in Juvenile Division, fate intervenes in the form of Kilvinsky's suicide. Plebesly learns about this indirectly, after his former partner's will goes through probate.

=== Roy Fehler ===
Fehler, also married, dropped out of college out of boredom. Fehler had wandered into an academic major of criminology, but had grown tired of college studies and joined the LAPD on the pretext of gaining several years' firsthand experience about crime and criminals. With little interest in the semi-military aspects of the police environment, firearms, or physical training, Fehler from the outset views himself as intellectually superior to his fellow cadets, and later the officers with whom he works.

Assigned to Newton Division, the poorest all-black division in the department, Fehler, like Plebesly, is also paired with a veteran officer nearing retirement, but the two experiences seemingly could not be more different. Whitey Duncan is an alcoholic, and as Fehler soon discovers, and drinks on the job from bottles concealed inside police callboxes. He exhibits an unpretentious street wisdom, though, that Fehler, in his conceit and scorn for Whitey, misses entirely. Roy, who has considered himself reasonable and thoughtful in all respects that his peers are not, develops a negative attitude toward the department's bureaucratic indifference that rivals that of any 20-year veteran.

Fehler experiences a mutual but mild dislike with all his partners, who vary from night to night, and his marriage quickly disintegrates after the birth of his daughter Becky, who becomes the one brightness in an otherwise bleak existence. After two years in Newton, he seemingly escapes to work Vice in downtown Central Division, but it is only a reprieve. He is sent to Seventy-Seventh Division (Watts), considered a virtual war zone in the LAPD, and in Fehler's mind, 10 times as bad as Newton. The transfer only deepens his cynicism and resentment. Distracted by a psychologically traumatic call concerning an abused infant, Fehler and his partner interrupt the robbery of a liquor store in the immediate aftermath of the call. Fehler is careless and is shot in the stomach by a blast from a sawed-off shotgun.

He survives, but his long, painful recovery is as traumatizing as the injury. The wound is slow to heal, Fehler endures a colostomy, and he is forced to live with his parents, where his job and injury are scorned and ridiculed. Worst of all, when he finally returns to full duty, it is back to patrol in Seventy-Seventh. Deluding himself that he had avoided a dependency on drugs, Fehler begins drinking, hiding bottles in both the trunk of his car and in callboxes. Just 26 years of age, Roy Fehler has devolved into Whitey Duncan. Returning to college studies has become all but forgotten, and he reaches bottom when he is suspended for 60 days without pay for drinking on duty.

Fehler's redemption begins when he takes a burglary report from a young black dental technician, Laura Hunt, and becomes infatuated with her. They fall in love and he moves in with her during his suspension, where she "dries him out". Rid of his arrogance and conceit, Roy believes he is finally "finding peace" with himself.

== The Watts riots ==
Wambaugh tightly controls his narrative of the Watts riots, which provides the backdrop for the novel's sixth and final part. He participated in it personally as an officer. He gives a harrowing account from the perspectives of his three main characters. At the end, however, it is not violence on a large scale that has the most effect on the lives of the three officers, but an unexpected act of personal violence, small in scale by comparison.

In the first chapter, the longest, the riot is revealed through the anxiety of Serge Duran, being held at Hollenbeck and waiting to have to enter it. Later, the nervous conversations of three officers thrown together in a radio car reveal aspects of the riot. They do not know where they are or what they should be doing. Leaderless, they finally fall in with a small collection of officers gathered by a sergeant and put down the looting in just one store on one block. They are stunned to realize that this show of authority is enough to "quell" most of the rioters in the area, some of whom are children. On his way home that night, Duran stops to eat. He orders menudo, a soup which has always represented his Chicano background, and finally identifies as Hispanic.

In the second chapter, the shortest, Gus Plebesly and his temporary partners arrive at the same decision. Plebesly is sitting in the back seat, fearful of what tests lie ahead, but suddenly they confront a crowd trying to set fire to a grocery. The police interrupt them and chase them. Plebesly finally runs down not just one, but three rioters, arresting them one at a time until he confronts the last. This man is much larger and more muscular than he, but he subdues him convincingly. Afterward, Plebesly is still afraid and sometimes almost as panic-stricken as before, but he learns he can endure.

Roy Fehler, in the third and next-to-last chapter, does little but observe. For half the chapter, he is pinned down behind a fire engine by a sniper, protecting his stomach from further injury and reflecting that even in the chaos of South Central Los Angeles, he has found peace in his life by being with Laura. A sergeant galvanizes the disorganized police remnants into action, but the night ends with an ugly incident. Roy's crew gets into a vehicle pursuit of looters, is almost machine-gunned at a National Guard roadblock, and then crash, looters escape when their car crashes. One of Roy's temporary partners shoots up the car and sets it afire. Soon after, Roy goes home to Laura. He rejects her offer of a drink and her apology about the riot (she is black). Roy soaks in a hot bath, and finally relaxed, asks Laura to marry him.

== Adaptations ==
In 1972, The New Centurions was adapted as a feature film released by Columbia Pictures, starring George C. Scott as Andy Kilvinsky and Stacy Keach as Roy Fehler. Columbia paid Wambaugh a bonus of $1,250.00 for each week the novel remained on the New York Times Best Seller list. Ultimately the novel, which first appeared on the list on February 21, 1971, remained on it for 32 weeks.
