= Ellis Wiley =

Canadian amateur photographer (1918–2002)

- Born: 1918
- Died: 2002 (aged 83–84)
- Occupation: accountant
- Known for: photographer of Toronto

Ellis Wiley (1918–2002) was a Canadian accountant and prolific amateur photographer. Wiley died in 2002, and his widow donated his just over 2,500 35mm slide films to the City of Toronto Archives. The Wiley collection spans the years 1945 to 1998.

Commentators note how often writers make use of Wiley's photos to illustrate books and articles about Toronto. They noted that not only was Wiley a good photographer, but that there were very few other freely re-usable images from the period when he was active. They noted that Wiley's collection includes many photos of iconic landmarks shortly before, or even during, demolition.

Derek Flack, writing for BlogTO, noted that Wiley's photos did contain imperfections, which marked him as a skilled amateur. He felt these imperfections added to their charm, and gave them a tone of immediacy.
