= The Delta Star =

1983 novel by Joseph Wambaugh

- First edition cover
- Author: Joseph Wambaugh
- Publisher: William Morrow & Co
- Publication date: 1983

The Delta Star is a 1983 novel by American author Joseph Wambaugh. The book is about a group of police in the Rampart Division of the Los Angeles Police Department. The main characters include Detective Mario Villalobos and The Bad Czech.

An excerpt was featured in the February 1983 issue of Playboy.

Kirkus Reviews wrote that it was "sorely uneven, but undeniably vivid and occasionally inspired."
