= The Blue Knight (film) =

1973 American television film

- Print advertisement
- Genre: Action; Crime; Drama; Thriller
- Based on: The Blue Knight by Joseph Wambaugh
- Written by: E. Jack Neuman
- Directed by: Robert Butler
- Starring: William Holden; Lee Remick; Joe Santos
- Composer: Nelson Riddle
- Country of origin: United States
- Original language: English
- No. of episodes: 4

Production
- Executive producer: Lee Rich
- Producer: Walter Coblenz
- Production location: Los Angeles
- Cinematography: Michael Margulies
- Editors: Marjorie Fowler; Samuel E. Beetley; Gene Fowler Jr.
- Running time: 188 minutes
- Production company: Lorimar Productions

Original release
- Network: NBC
- Release: November 11 – November 14, 1973

Related
- The Blue Knight (TV series)

The Blue Knight is a 1973 television and theatrical film adapted from Joseph Wambaugh's 1973 novel The Blue Knight. It inspired the 1975 TV series also titled The Blue Knight. The miniseries was broadcast on NBC TV in November 1973, consisted of four one-hour episodes (including commercials), was directed by Robert Butler, and featured an all star cast headed by William Holden as Police Officer Bumper Morgan. The additional cast includes Lee Remick, Eileen Brennan, Sam Elliott, Joe Santos, and Vic Tayback. It was later released as a film in condensed form.

== Premise ==
Bumper Morgan is a 20-year veteran of the Los Angeles Police Department who is scheduled to retire in a week. Before he leaves, he must work on the murder of a prostitute in one of LA's far corners. Along the way, he must grapple with vicious thugs, his fellow officers who have mixed feelings about his retirement, and his woman who wants him to leave the streets.

== Cast ==
- William Holden as Bumper Morgan
- Lee Remick as Cassie Walters
- Anne Archer as Laila
- Sam Elliott as Detective Charlie Bronski
- Joe Santos as Sergeant Cruz Segovia
- Vic Tayback as Neil Grogan
- Lucille Benson as Elmira Gooch
- Ja'Net DuBois as Celia Louise
- Mario Roccuzzo as Harold Wagner
- Jamie Farr as Yasser Hafiz

== Production ==
Holden said he was surprised to be cast as Morgan, as he thought Ernest Borgnine or Rod Steiger would have been preferred. Shooting took seven weeks. The Blue Knight was filmed as a four-episode miniseries of 60 minutes each for the US market and a 100-minute theatrical film for European markets. It was one of the first miniseries on American television.

== Reception ==
The film was broadcast on four consecutive evenings, beginning on November 11, 1973, and received positive reviews. Jay Sharbutt of the Associated Press praised the miniseries' realism and wrote that readers "ought to catch this show". Rick Du Brow of United Press International wrote that the miniseries' length allows it to unfold slowly and create a "cohesive dramatic atmosphere", unlike typical TV films. Time Out London, in a retrospective review of the theatrical cut, called it "seminal stuff" and wrote that it is more interesting for its influence on following police dramas than its story.

== Awards ==
William Holden won the Primetime Emmy Award for Outstanding Lead Actor in a Limited Series or Movie (in his first TV film role), director Robert Butler, and editors Marjorie and Gene Fowler Jr. Lee Remick received an Emmy nomination. The show was also nominated for Outstanding Limited Series.

Remick won the Golden Globe Award for Best Actress in a Television Series Drama for her role in the film.

Award	Date of ceremony	Category	Recipient(s)	Result	Ref.
Primetime Emmy Awards	May 28, 1974	Actor of the Year – Special	William Holden	Nominated	
Primetime Emmy Awards	May 28, 1974	Best Directing in Drama – A Single Program of a Series with Continuing Characters and/or Theme	Robert Butler (for "Part III")	Won	
Primetime Emmy Awards	May 28, 1974	Best Film Editing For Entertainment Programming – For A Special Or Feature Length Program Made For Television	Gene Fowler Jr., Marjorie Fowler, and Samuel E. Beetley	Won	
Primetime Emmy Awards	May 28, 1974	Best Lead Actor in a Limited Series	William Holden	Won	
Primetime Emmy Awards	May 28, 1974	Best Lead Actress in a Limited Series	Lee Remick	Nominated	
Primetime Emmy Awards	May 28, 1974	Director of the Year – Series	Robert Butler (for "Part III")	Won	
Primetime Emmy Awards	May 28, 1974	Film Editor of the Year	Gene Fowler Jr., Marjorie Fowler, and Samuel E. Beetley	Nominated	
Primetime Emmy Awards	May 28, 1974	Outstanding Limited Series	The Blue Knight	Nominated	
Golden Globes	January 26, 1984	Best Actress – Television Series Drama	Lee Remick	Won	
