= Mittie Lawrence =

American actress and model (born 1941)

- Born: September 1, 1941 (age 84)
- Occupation: Actress
- Years active: 1959–1972

Mittie Lawrence (born September 1, 1941) is an American actress and model. The winner of the 1959 Miss Bronze California beauty pageant, she was best known for appearance as a "billboard girl" on Steve Allen's television variety show and from her performances as Fanny Brice's personal assistant and confidant in the 1968 musical Funny Girl and as the nurse turned radical in the 1972 drama Night Call Nurses.
