= The Blue Knight (novel) =

1972 novel by Joseph Wambaugh

- First edition
- Author: Joseph Wambaugh
- Language: English
- Genre: Detective novel
- Publisher: Little, Brown and Company
- Publication date: February 28, 1972
- Publication place: United States
- Media type: Print (hardback & paperback)
- Pages: 320 pp
- ISBN: 978-0440106074

The Blue Knight is the second novel by former Los Angeles Police detective Joseph Wambaugh, written while he was still a serving detective. Published in 1972, it follows the last days on the beat for a veteran LAPD police officer, detailing his thoughts and actions from a first person perspective. The narrative is written in a coarse, sometimes self-deprecating manner; in the first chapter, Bumper refers to himself as having "an ass two nightsticks wide".

== Plot summary ==
The novel is about a veteran LAPD beat cop named William "Bumper" Morgan, who utilizes intimidation and in some cases physical violence in his dealings with the criminal elements he encounters. The book covers his last week on the job before his planned retirement.

== Reception ==
According to WorldCat, the book was held in 1,645 libraries in 2025. It inspired the 1973 TV miniseries The Blue Knight and the 1975 TV series The Blue Knight.
