= Maury Winetrobe =

American film and music editor

- Born: Maurice Harold Winetrobe; July 6, 1922; Chelsea, Massachusetts, U.S.
- Died: April 1, 2008 (aged 85); Los Angeles, California, U.S.
- Occupation(s): Film and music editor
- Spouse: Cecelia Winetrobe
- Children: 2

Maurice Harold Winetrobe (July 6, 1922 – April 1, 2008) was an American film and music editor. He was nominated for an Academy Award in the category Best Film Editing for the film Funny Girl.

Winetrobe died on April 1, 2008, in Los Angeles, California, at the age of 85.

== Selected filmography ==
- Funny Girl (1968; co-nominated with Robert Swink and William Sands)
